= 1998 in Australian television =

== Events ==
- February – Kim Kilbey starts hosting Australia's Funniest Home Video Show, replacing long-time host Jo Beth Taylor.
- 12 February – British Swiss children's animated TV series Pingu (which started off as a segment on the Seven Network's The Book Place) makes its debut on ABC, starting off with the first two episodes at 8:25 am. It will later broadcast several more episodes on 24 March at 3:55 pm and again in several months on weekdays at 10:25 am, 9:25 am, 7:25 am (for Sundays), 8:25 am (for a second time) and at 4:55 pm (until 1 January 1999 in all states and on 8 January 1999 in Western Australia).
- 16 February – The pink rabbit Mixy from The Ferals/Feral TV presents her own children's weekday morning block on ABC, starting from 7:30 am to 10:00 am.
- 16 February – British children's series Teletubbies debuts on ABC.
- 18 February – The talk show The Panel debuts on Network Ten.
- 24 February – The hospital drama series All Saints debuts on the Seven Network.
- 27 February – The British drama series Midsomer Murders premieres on the Nine Network.
- 1 March – The American comedy series Dharma and Greg premieres on the Seven Network.
- 27 March – Darwin finally gets a second commercial television station when TND-34 opens, taking a Seven Network affiliation.
- WIN Television WA is granted a licence to expand its broadcast into regional & remote Western Australia.
- 27 April – Network Ten launches game show Battle of the Sexes, hosted by Ed Phillips. Also that night, Network Ten begins Fast Forward’s Funniest Moments, featuring sketch highlights from the former Seven Network comedy show for twelve-episode run. Fast Forward’s Funniest Moments was digitised and was released on DVD in 2004 as part of the Fast Forward in Rewind collection.
- 10 May – Australian drama series SeaChange debuts on ABC.
- 24 June – Karl Kennedy (Alan Fletcher) has a massive fight with Susan Kennedy (Jackie Woodbourne) about his feud with serial bombshell Sarah Beaumont (Nicola Charles), and slaps him in the face very hard on Neighbours.
- 29 June – British sitcom Father Ted premieres on the ABC, two years after its debut on the Nine Network.
- 7 July – GMA with Bert Newton celebrates its 1500th episode. The show began as The Morning Show in 1992 and took on the Good Morning Australia name the following year. That night, Network Ten screens the Kylie Minogue concert special Kylie – Intimate And Live, including behind-the-scenes footage of two months of preparation, planning and rehearsal for Minogue's Australian tour.
- 20 July – Hey Hey It's Saturday launches its Red Faces documentary series and spin off Gonged But Not Forgotten, premieres at 8:30 pm, on the Nine Network.
- 31 July – The Wiggles' first self-titled television series debuts on the Seven Network.
- 22 August – British pop duo Lighthouse Family perform on the Nine Network variety program Hey Hey It's Saturday.
- 28 September – Pokémon makes its debut on Network Ten.
- 12 October – Nine Network debuts a brand new talk show called Strassman, presented by American ventriloquist and comedian David Strassman at 9:00 pm.
- 22 November – The 1995 film Babe premieres on the Seven Network.
- 27 November – After thirteen years, the final edition of Midday airs on the Nine Network, and Ray Martin leaves A Current Affair. He was replaced by Mike Munro. Martin would later return to the program five years later. On the same night, Brian Naylor retires from reading Melbourne's National Nine News after twenty years; he is replaced by Peter Hitchener.
- December – The remote Central & Eastern Australia markets are aggregated, with Imparja taking a Nine Network affiliation & Seven Central (formerly QSTV) taking a joint Seven & Network Ten affiliation.
- 20 December – The pay television station Disney Channel Australia introduced Foxtel to The Wiggles who debuted in a special taking place in Disneyland, California titled The Wiggles in Disneyland. This was later screened on the Seven Network. Future Hollywood actor Hugh Jackman hosts the 1998 Carols in the Domain, live on the Seven Network.
- 21 December – Network Ten debuts a brand new children's series aimed at pre-schoolers called In the Box, replacing The Music Shop.
- 24 December – The children's series Misery Guts which only ran for thirteen episodes, premieres on Nine Network.

== Debuts ==
=== Domestic ===
Program	Channel	Debut date
Breakers	Network Ten	2 February
Mixy	ABC TV	16 February
The Panel	Network Ten	18 February
Hot Streak	Seven Network	23 February
All Saints	Seven Network	24 February
Kings in Grass Castles	Seven Network	29 March
Bananas in Pyjamas: Bumping and a Jumping	ABC TV	13 April
Denise	Seven Network	20 April
Battle of the Sexes	Network Ten	27 April
SeaChange	ABC TV	10 May
The Micallef P(r)ogram(me)	ABC TV	11 May
Live and Kicking	Seven Network	20 May
Petals	ABC TV	1 June
Bobtales	SBS TV	29 June
Gonged But Not Forgotten: Australia's Best & Worst of Red Faces	Nine Network	20 July
The Wiggles // Let’s Wiggle	Seven Network	31 July
The Games	ABC TV	17 August
Search for Treasure Island	Seven Network	17 August
Something Stupid	Seven Network	31 August
Driven Crazy	Network Ten	4 September
Changing Rooms	Nine Network	23 September
Stingers	Nine Network	29 September
Skippy: Adventures in Bushtown	Nine Network	8 October
House From Hell	Network Ten	8 October
The Toothbrush Family (season 2)	Network Ten	10 October
Ketchup: Cats Who Cook	Network Ten	10 October
The Big Cheez	Network Ten	10 October
Strassman	Nine Network	12 October
The Day of the Roses	Network Ten	18 October
A Difficult Woman	ABC TV	18 October
The Russell Gilbert Show	Nine Network	19 October
Hazards, Disasters and Survival	ABC TV	26 October
Too Much Medicine?	ABC TV	12 November
Global Village	SBS TV	30 November
In the Box	Network Ten	21 December
Misery Guts	Nine Network	24 December

=== International ===
Program	Channel	Debut date
(United States) Ghost Stories	Network Ten	1 January
(United Kingdom) Ramadan Journeys	SBS TV	4 January
(United States) The Lazarus Man	Seven Network	8 January
(United States) Campus Cops	Network Ten	17 January
(United Kingdom) The Merchant of Venice (1996)	ABC TV	17 January
(United States) All Dogs Go to Heaven: The Series	Seven Network	20 January
(United States) The Last Frontier	Seven Network	22 January
(United States) Big Bad Beetleborgs	Network Ten	2 February
(United States) The Great American Sex Scandal	Seven Network	4 February
(United States) Jumanji	Network Ten	6 February
(United States) Men in Black: The Series	Network Ten	6 February
(United Kingdom) / (Italy) Nostromo	ABC TV	6 February
(United States) Soul Man	Seven Network	8 February
(Canada) Stickin' Around (TV series)	ABC TV	8 February
(United States) Veronica's Closet	Nine Network	9 February
(United States) Just Shoot Me!	Network Ten	11 February
(United Kingdom) / (Switzerland) Pingu	ABC TV	12 February
(United States) Team Knight Rider	Network Ten	13 February
(United Kingdom) Teletubbies	ABC TV	16 February
(United States) Extreme Dinosaurs	Network Ten	16 February
(United Kingdom) Materials We Need	ABC TV	16 February
(United States) Stephen Hawking's Universe	ABC TV	21 February
(United Kingdom) Midsomer Murders	Nine Network	27 February
(United States) Dharma and Greg	Seven Network	1 March
(United States) Goode Behavior	Seven Network	2 March
(United States) / (Canada) The Little Lulu Show	ABC TV	6 March
(United Kingdom) Jonathan Creek	ABC TV	6 March
(United States) Homeboys in Outer Space	Seven Network	13 March
(Canada) / (France) / (New Zealand) White Fang	Seven Network	14 March
(United States) One West Waikiki	Seven Network	24 March
(United States) Toonsylvania	Nine Network	28 March
(United Kingdom) Kipper	ABC TV	8 April
(United Kingdom) Sometime, Never	ABC TV	13 April
(United Kingdom) Soul Music	ABC TV	17 April
(United States) Buddies	Seven Network	20 April
(United States) The Angry Beavers	ABC TV	21 April
(United Kingdom) Our Mutual Friend (1998)	ABC TV	26 April
(United States) Pauly	Seven Network	27 April
(Canada) Fly by Night	Seven Network	27 April
(United States) / (Canada) Ninja Turtles: The Next Mutation	Network Ten	4 May
(United States) Mummies Alive!	Seven Network	5 May
(United States) Hypernauts	Nine Network	9 May
(United Kingdom) Spirits of the Jaguar	ABC TV	10 May
(United Kingdom) Big Cat Diary	ABC TV	13 May
(France) Around the World in 80 Dreams	Seven Network	14 May
(United States) Bureau of Alien Detectors	Network Ten	15 May
(United States) Extreme Ghostbusters	Network Ten	18 May
(United States) Power Rangers Turbo	Seven Network	21 May
(United Kingdom) True Tilda	ABC TV	24 May
(New Zealand) Hairy Maclary	ABC TV	1 June
(United Kingdom) The Forgotten Toys (TV series)	ABC TV	1 June
(United Kingdom) The Morph Files	ABC TV	1 June
(United Kingdom) Wyrd Sisters	ABC TV	5 June
(Germany) Radetzky March	SBS TV	8 June
(Canada) Freaky Stories	ABC TV	8 June
(Australia) / (Germany) Tabaluga	Seven Network	13 June
(United Kingdom) A Respectable Trade	Nine Network	14 June
(United States) Jungle Cubs	Seven Network	20 June
(United States) Space: Above and Beyond	SBS TV	28 June
(United Kingdom) Land of the Tiger	ABC TV	28 June
(Canada) / (France) / (New Zealand) The Adventures of the Black Stallion	Seven Network	28 June
(United States) Baywatch Nights	Network Ten	30 June
(United States) Merlin	Nine Network	5 July
(United Kingdom) The Animal Shelf	ABC TV	7 July
(United Kingdom) Enid Blyton's Enchanted Lands	ABC TV	7 July
(United States) EZ Streets	Network Ten	8 July
(United States) Deadly Games	Seven Network	14 July
(United States) Dr. Katz, Professional Therapist	SBS TV	18 July
(United Kingdom) Game On	ABC TV	23 July
(United States) Pensacola: Wings of Gold	Nine Network	8 August
(United States) Working	Seven Network	9 August
(United Kingdom) Reckless	Seven Network	12 August
(New Zealand) Oscar and Friends	ABC TV	12 August
(United Kingdom) The Scold's Bridle	ABC TV	16 August
(United States) Nick Freno: Licensed Teacher	Nine Network	17 August
(United Kingdom) The Human Body	ABC TV	20 August
(Australia) / (United Kingdom) Minty	ABC TV	20 August
(United States) Ally McBeal	Seven Network	24 August
(United Kingdom) Fall from Grace	Network Ten	24 August
(United States) Mad TV	Nine Network	27 August
(United Kingdom) In the Red	ABC TV	30 August
(United Kingdom) Plotlands	ABC TV	4 September
(United States) Science Court	Seven Network	5 September
(United Kingdom) Airport	Nine Network	23 September
(United States) Cow and Chicken	Seven Network	24 September
(United States) The Visitor	Seven Network	24 September
(Japan) Pokémon	Network Ten	28 September
(United States) The Roseanne Show	Network Ten	28 September
(New Zealand) The Magical World of Margaret Mahy	ABC TV	28 September
(United States) Mr. Rhodes	Seven Network	1 October
(United States) USA High	Seven Network	3 October
(United States) A Season in Purgatory	Network Ten	12 October
(United States) Aliens in the Family (1996)	Seven Network	21 October
(United States) Mr. & Mrs. Smith	Seven Network	21 October
(United Kingdom) In the Footsteps of Alexander the Great	ABC TV	24 October
(United Kingdom) How Do You Want Me?	ABC TV	2 November
(United Kingdom) Ultraviolet	ABC TV	4 November
(United States) Brooklyn South	Nine Network	5 November
(United Kingdom) 1914-1918	ABC TV	5 November
(United States) The New Adventures of Zorro (1997)	Nine Network	7 November
(Canada) The Cola Conquest	ABC TV	21 November
(United States) The Jerry Springer Show	Network Ten	26 November
(United Kingdom) Delia's How to Cook	ABC TV	26 November
(United States) The Love Boat: The Next Wave	Network Ten	29 November
(United Kingdom) The Life of Birds	ABC TV	29 November
(Canada) La Femme Nikita	Nine Network	30 November
(United States) Felicity	Seven Network	30 November
(United States) Tarzan: The Epic Adventures	Nine Network	30 November
(Scotland) Looking After Jo Jo	ABC TV	1 December
(United States) The Net	Network Ten	2 December
(Canada) PSI Factor: Chronicles of the Paranormal	Network Ten	2 December
(United States) Two Guys, a Girl and a Pizza Place	Seven Network	3 December
(United States) Townies	Seven Network	3 December
(United Kingdom) The Ambassador	Seven Network	3 December
(United States) Alright Already	Network Ten	3 December
(United States) V.I.P.	Network Ten	4 December
(United Kingdom) Brambly Hedge	Nine Network	5 December
(United Kingdom) / (United States) More Tales of the City	Nine Network	6 December
(United States) Kids Say the Darndest Things	Nine Network	8 December
(United States) Storm Warning	Network Ten	14 December
(United Kingdom) The Boss	ABC TV	14 December
(United States) Invasion America	Nine Network	14 December
(United States) The Gregory Hines Show	Nine Network	19 December
(United States) Meego	Nine Network	19 December
(United Kingdom) Father Christmas and the Missing Reindeer	Seven Network	23 December
(United Kingdom) / (France) Oscar's Orchestra	ABC TV	28 December
(United States) / (Canada) Poltergeist: The Legacy	Seven Network	29 December
(United Kingdom) Meet the Ancestors	SBS TV	30 December
(United States) Project ALF	Seven Network	30 December
(Spain) Koki	ABC TV	31 December

=== Subscription television ===
==== Domestic ====
Program	Channel	Debut date
Funhouse	Fox Kids	January

==== International ====
Program	Channel	Debut date
(United States) Good & Evil	thecomedychannel	January
(United States) The Wacky World of Tex Avery	Disney Channel	January
(United States) Pepper Ann	Disney Channel	January
(United States) Nightmare Ned	Disney Channel	January
(United Kingdom) Paul Merton in Galton & Simpson's	arena	1 January
(United States) Extreme Machines	Discovery Channel	6 January
(United States) Guiding Light	FOX Soap	12 January
(United States) Singled Out	MTV Australia	1 April
(United Kingdom) Renford Rejects	Nickelodeon	5 June
(United States) The Journey of Allen Strange	Nickelodeon	1 July
(United Kingdom) Family Affairs	UKTV	3 July
(United States) CatDog	Nickelodeon	10 October
(United States) The Wild Thornberrys	Nickelodeon	12 December
(Canada) Franklin	Nickelodeon	1998
(Canada) / (United Kingdom) / (France) The Adventures of Paddington Bear	Nickelodeon	1998
(Sweden) / (United Kingdom) The 3 Friends and Jerry	Nickelodeon	1998
(Canada) Breaker High	Fox Kids	1998
(United States) / (Canada) The Adventures of Sinbad	Fox Kids	1998
(United States) Bear in the Big Blue House	Disney Channel	1998
(Canada) / (United States) / (France) The Country Mouse and the City Mouse Adventures	Nickelodeon	1998
(France) Kassai and Luk	Nickelodeon	1998
(United States) Austin Stories	The Comedy Channel	1998
(United Kingdom) Rex the Runt	The Comedy Channel	1998
(United Kingdom) / (Canada) Captain Star	The Disney Channel	1998
(United Kingdom) Pond Life	The Comedy Channel	1998
(United States) / (Canada) Pocket Dragon Adventures	Fox Kids	1998
(Canada) Student Bodies	Disney Channel	1998
(United States) The All New Captain Kangaroo	Fox Kids	1998
(France) Space Goofs	Fox Kids	1998
(United Kingdom) The Adventures of Dawdle the Donkey	Fox Kids	1998
(Canada) The Big Comfy Couch	Disney Channel	1998
(Canada) Chicken Minute	Disney Channel	1998
(United States) The Kidsongs Television Show	Disney Channel	1998

=== Telemovies ===
==== International ====
Program	Channel	Debut date
(United Kingdom) King Leek	arena	29 January

=== Specials ===
==== International ====
Program	Channel	Debut date
(United States) Paul Reiser: Three and Half Blocks From Home	thecomedychannel	18 January

=== Changes to network affiliation ===
This is a list of programs which made their premiere on an Australian television network that had previously premiered on another Australian television network. The networks involved in the switch of allegiances are predominantly both free-to-air networks or both subscription television networks. Programs that have their free-to-air/subscription television premiere, after previously premiering on the opposite platform (free-to air to subscription/subscription to free-to air) are not included. In some cases, programs may still air on the original television network. This occurs predominantly with programs shared between subscription television networks.

==== Domestic ====
Program	New network(s)	Previous network(s)	Date
The Gift	ABC TV	Nine Network	28 December

==== International ====
Program	New network(s)	Previous network(s)	Date
(United States) Murder, She Wrote	Nine Network	Network Ten	1 February
(United Kingdom) Keeping Up Appearances	Seven Network	ABC	28 March
(United Kingdom) Heartbeat	Seven Network	ABC	6 April
(United States) The New Archies	Network Ten	Nine Network	8 May
(United Kingdom) / (Republic of Ireland) Father Ted	ABC	Nine Network	29 June
(United Kingdom) Jim Henson's The Storyteller	ABC	Network Ten	7 July
(United Kingdom) / (Republic of Ireland) A Christmassy Ted	ABC	Nine Network	23 December

=== Subscription premieres ===
This is a list of programs which made their premiere on Australian subscription television that had previously premiered on Australian free-to-air television. Programs may still air on the original free-to-air television network.

==== Domestic ====
Program	Subscription network	Free-to-air network	Date
Crocadoo	Cartoon Network	Nine Network	5 January

==== International ====
Program	Subscription network	Free-to-air network	Date
(United Kingdom) Traffik	UKTV	ABC TV	4 January
(France) / (Canada) The Adventures of Tintin	Cartoon Network	ABC TV	5 January
(United Kingdom) 99 - 1	arena		11 January
(United Kingdom) Oranges Are Not the Only Fruit	UKTV	ABC TV	17 January
(United Kingdom) The Fear	UKTV	ABC TV	22 January
(United Kingdom) Lillie	UKTV	Seven Network	2 April
(United States) South Park	The Comedy Channel	SBS TV	2 June
(United States) Seinfeld	TV1	Nine Network; Network Ten	6 July
(United Kingdom) Woof!	Nickelodeon	Nine Network; ABC TV	5 September
(United Kingdom) The Demon Headmaster	Nickelodeon	ABC TV	5 September
(United Kingdom) Delta Wave	Nickelodeon		5 September
(United States) American Gothic	TV1	Network Ten	5 December
(United Kingdom) The Chronicles of Narnia	Nickelodeon	ABC TV	6 December
(Canada) The Adventures of Sinbad	Fox Kids	Network Ten	1998
(United States) King of the Hill	Fox8	Seven Network	1998
(United States) / (United Kingdom) / (Germany) Secret Life of Toys	Fox Kids	ABC TV	1998

== Television shows ==
ABC

- Mr. Squiggle and Friends (1959–1999)
- Four Corners (1961–present)

Seven Network

- Wheel of Fortune (1981–1996, 1996–2003, 2004–06)
- Home and Away (1988–present)
- Blue Heelers (1994–2006)
- The Great Outdoors (1993–present)
- Today Tonight (1995–present)

Nine Network

- Today (1982–present)
- Sale of the Century (1980–2001)
- A Current Affair (1971–1978, 1988–present)
- Hey Hey It's Saturday (1971–1999)
- Midday (1985–1998)
- 60 Minutes (1979–present)
- Australia's Funniest Home Video Show (1990–2000, 2000–2004, 2005–present)
- The AFL Footy Show (1994–present)
- The NRL Footy Show (1994–present)
- Water Rats (1996–2001)
- Burgo's Catch Phrase (1997–2001, 2002–2003)
- The Price is Right (1993–1998)

Network Ten

- Neighbours (Seven Network 1985, Network Ten 1986–present)
- GMA with Bert Newton (1991–2005)
- Totally Full Frontal (1998–1999)

== Ending / resting this year ==
Date	Show	Channel	Debut
10 February	Raw FM	ABC TV	1997
15 March	Children's Hospital	ABC TV	1997
14 April	Li'l Elvis Jones and the Truckstoppers	ABC TV	6 March 1998
13 June	Challenger	Channel Nine	1997
23 June	Good Guys, Bad Guys	Channel Nine	1997
6 July	Magic Mountain	ABC TV	1997
24 July	The Silver Brumby	Network Ten	1996
19 August	The Genie from Down Under	ABC TV	1996
18 September	Battle of the Sexes	Channel Ten	27 April 1998
21 September	Bobtales	SBS TV	29 June 1998
30 September	Crocadoo	Channel Nine	1996
2 October	The Price Is Right	Channel Nine	1993
5 October	Something Stupid	Channel Seven	31 August 1998
8 November	A Difficult Woman	ABC TV	18 October 1998
15 November	Who Dares Wins	Channel Seven	1996
17 November	Skippy: Adventures in Bushtown	Channel Nine	8 October 1998
19 November	House From Hell	Channel Ten	8 October 1998
23 November	Healthy, Wealthy and Wise	Channel Ten	1992
23 November	State Coroner	Channel Ten	1997
23 November	The Russell Gilbert Show	Channel Nine	19 October 1998
27 November	Driven Crazy	Channel Ten	4 September 1998
27 November	The Music Shop	Channel Ten	1996
27 November	Hot Streak	Channel Seven	23 February 1998
27 November	The Midday Show	Channel Nine	1985
27 November	In Melbourne Tonight	Channel Nine	1996 (II)
18 December	Where You Find the Ladybird	Channel Ten	1996
1998	A*mazing	Channel Seven	1994
1998	Time Masters	Channel Seven	1996

== See also ==
- 1998 in Australia
- List of Australian films of 1998
