= 1999 in Australian television =

The year 1999 in Australian television involved many events.

== Events ==
- 11 January – The ABC moves its long running children's series Play School from its long standing time-slot of 4pm weekdays, to 3:30pm.
- 1 February – QSTV becomes an affiliate of the Seven Network, becoming known as Seven Central.
- 13 February – A new Australian science fiction drama series for children Crash Zone produced by the Australian Children's Television Foundation in association with the Disney Channel begins its air on Seven Network.
- 19 February - Neighbours airs the famous Full Monty strip scene involving Karl Kennedy, Joel Samuels, Drew Kirk, Toadie Rebecchi and Billy Kennedy.
- March – WIN Television WA commences broadcasting to regional & remote Western Australia, ending the long-time monopoly held by Golden West Network.
- April – Who Wants to Be a Millionaire? begins on Channel Nine and Adriana Xenides retires from Seven's Wheel of Fortune after 18 years as letter turner. She will be replaced by former model Sophie Falkiner. Xenides died from bowel cancer in 2010.
- 7 April – The famous bugger commercial for the Toyota Hilux that originally aired in New Zealand goes to air for the first time on Australian television during a commercial break of an episode of The Panel on Network Ten.
- 9 April – American animated sitcom Family Guy debuts on the Seven Network.
- 19 April – Final episode of Australian talk show Strassman airs on Nine Network.
- 21 April - In Neighbours, Hannah Martin returns from France; Philip Martin's birthday
- 6 May – Musical director Geoff Harvey is sacked from the Nine Network after 38 years.
- 28 May – Final episode of the Australian National morning program 11AM airs on the Seven Network. The show was axed after 24 years.
- May – The Seven Network becomes the first Australian television network to introduce a watermark on its on-air programs.
- 21 June - In Neighbours, Toadie Rebecchi loses his famous ponytail.
- 28 June – Australian drama series SeaChange returns to the ABC for a second season achieving recording ratings for the network.
- 1 July – Australian children's longest running series Mr. Squiggle celebrates its 40th year.
- 9 July – Australian children's longest running series Mr. Squiggle airs its final episode on the ABC.
- 13 July - In Neighbours, it was Sarah Beaumont and Peter Hannay's wedding.
- 19 August – A brand new Australian political satire sketch comedy television series called BackBerner presented by standup comic Peter Berner and noted Australian character actor Louise Siversen screens on the ABC.
- 31 August – American sitcom The King of Queens starring Kevin James premieres on the Nine Network.
- 20 September – British children's animated series Bob the Builder debuts on the ABC.
- 17 October – British six-part documentary series Walking with Dinosaurs debuts on the ABC.
- 20 October - In Neighbours, Philip and Hannah Martin and Ruth Wilkinson leave; Joe, Lyn, Steph, Flick and Michelle Scully arrive.
- 24 October – American crime drama series The Sopranos begins on the Nine Network.
- 19 November – Studio 9 Unplugged, a tribute special dedicated the famous studio rooms at GTV9 presented by Don Lane, goes to air on the Nine Network, ending a 40-year era of live television in that studio.
- 20 November – The final episode of Hey Hey It's Saturday airs on Nine Network. Before retiring, the creator, host and producer of the series Daryl Somers leaves Nine Network after 28 years.
- 23 November – The 1996 slasher film Scream starring David Arquette, Neve Campbell and Courteney Cox premieres on the Nine Network at 9:30pm.
- 26 November – British cooking programme The Naked Chef starring Jamie Oliver screens on the ABC. In Neighbours, the 1999 season final features the Millennium party plus the Scully house burns!
- 2 December – American animated science fiction sitcom Futurama created by Matt Groening the creator of The Simpsons debuts on the Seven Network.
- 13 December – Australian children's educational TV series Lift Off airs on ABC for the very last time at 10:00am.
- 31 December – ABC is the host Australian broadcaster of the international TV event 2000 Today, a 26-hour live telecast of new year celebrations around the world, commencing at 8:30pm (AEDST) on 31 December.
- Jana Wendt becomes presenter of the Australian television public affairs program Dateline.

=== Channels ===
==== New channels ====
- 4 April – Australian Christian Channel
- 1 October – Oh!

== Debuts ==
=== Free-to-air ===
==== Domestic ====
Program	Network	Debut date
The Adventures of Sam	ABC TV	29 January
Thunderstone	Network Ten	12 February
Crash Zone	Seven Network	13 February
Wipeout	Seven Network	15 February
Hi-5	Nine Network	12 April
Who Wants to Be a Millionaire?	Nine Network	18 April
The $1,000,000 Chance of a Lifetime	Seven Network	31 May
See How They Run	ABC TV	6 June
Pig's Breakfast	Nine Network	5 July
The Mick Molloy Show	Nine Network	10 July
Sunday Sunrise	Seven Network	25 July
The Big Breakfast	Seven Network	2 August
Dog's Head Bay	ABC TV	16 August
BackBerner	ABC TV	19 August
The 10:30 Slot	ABC TV	20 August
High Flyers	Network Ten	28 August
Unreal TV	Network Ten	5 September
Flipper & Lopaka	Seven Network	10 September
Rove	Nine Network	22 September
Chuck Finn	Seven Network	18 October
Bananas in Pyjamas: Surprise Party	ABC TV	18 October
Y?	Nine Network	1 November
Ground Force	Seven Network	1999

==== International ====
Program	Channel	Debut date
(United Kingdom) Percy the Park Keeper	Nine Network	2 January
(United States) / (Canada) WildC.A.T.S.	Network Ten	6 January
(United Kingdom) Aquila	ABC TV	10 January
(United States) Chicago Sons	Nine Network	12 January
(United States) Daria	ABC TV	12 January
(United States) Dawson's Creek	Network Ten	19 January
(France) / (United States) The New Adventures of Robin Hood	Network Ten	22 January
(France) Gulliver's Travels	Nine Network	30 January
(United States) World's Wildest Police Videos	Network Ten	1 February
(United Kingdom) Vanity Fair (1998)	ABC TV	7 February
(United States) Maggie	Network Ten	7 February
(United States) Godzilla: The Series	Network Ten	7 February
(United States) Jesse	Nine Network	8 February
(United Kingdom) The Young Person's Guide to Becoming a Rock Star	ABC TV	10 February
(United Kingdom) The Hello Girls	ABC TV	11 February
(United States) Beyond Belief: Fact or Fiction	Network Ten	13 February
(United States) Celebrity Deathmatch	Network Ten	18 February
(United Kingdom) Big Train	ABC TV	22 February
(United States) CatDog	ABC TV	24 February
(United States) Power Rangers in Space	Seven Network	25 February
(United States) The Magnificent Seven	Seven Network	27 February
(United States) Rude Awakening	Network Ten	4 March
(United Kingdom) Is It Legal?	Seven Network	12 March
Faces in Contemporary Greece Song	SBS	20 March
(Canada) / (France) Animal Crackers	ABC TV	24 March
(United Kingdom) Lesley Garrett Tonight	ABC TV	27 March
(United States) / (Canada) Titanic	Nine Network	30 March
(United States) The Jamie Foxx Show	Nine Network	31 March
(Germany) Ted Sieger's Wildlife	ABC TV	5 April
(United States) Family Guy	Seven Network	9 April
(United Kingdom) Rocky and the Dodos	ABC TV	16 April
(United Kingdom) Echo	ABC TV	24 April
(United States) World's Most...	Nine Network	10 May
(Canada) Animorphs	ABC TV	10 May
(Canada) / (Australia) Dumb Bunnies	Seven Network	15 May
(France) Zoo Olympics	ABC TV	18 May
(United Kingdom) Eye of the Storm	ABC TV	6 June
(United Kingdom) League of Gentlemen	ABC TV	9 June
(United Kingdom) Psychos	ABC TV	9 June
(United Kingdom) Sir Bernard's Stately Homes	ABC TV	9 June
(United States) Fantasy Island (1998)	Network Ten	11 June
(United States) Claude's Crib	Seven Network	14 June
(Australia) / (United States) Croc Files	Network Ten	28 June
(United Kingdom) The Treasure Seekers	ABC TV	4 July
(United Kingdom) Bimble's Bucket	Nine Network	4 July
(United States) Charmed	Network Ten	6 July
(United States) Histeria!	Nine Network	8 July
(United Kingdom) Supernatural: The Unseen Powers of Animals	ABC TV	9 July
(United States) Brother's Keeper	Network Ten	11 July
(United Kingdom) Rick Stein's Seafood Odyssey	ABC TV	14 July
(United Kingdom) Bodyguards	Network Ten	17 July
(United Kingdom) The Planets	ABC TV	21 July
(United States) Becker	Network Ten	21 July
(United States) Will & Grace	Seven Network	22 July
(France) / (Canada) / (United Kingdom) Albert the Fifth Musketeer	ABC TV	23 July
(United Kingdom) Stanley's Dragon	ABC TV	25 July
(United States) L.A. Doctors	Network Ten	26 July
(United States) The Fantastic Voyages of Sinbad the Sailor	Nine Network	31 July
(United States) The Wild Thornberrys	ABC TV	2 August
(United Kingdom) Maisy	ABC TV	6 August
(United Kingdom) The Worst Witch	ABC TV	8 August
(United Kingdom) Births, Marriages and Deaths	ABC TV	15 August
(United States) The New Woody Woodpecker Show	Network Ten	15 August
(United Kingdom) The Prince and the Pauper (1996)	ABC TV	15 August
(United States) For Your Love	Nine Network	19 August
(Canada) Looking for Miracles	Nine Network	22 August
(United States) Raging Planet	Seven Network	23 August
(Sweden) Lisa	ABC TV	27 August
(United Kingdom) The First Snow of Winter	ABC TV	30 August
(Canada) / (United States) George and Martha	ABC TV	30 August
(United States) The King of Queens	Nine Network	31 August
(Austria) Inspector Rex	SBS	2 September
(United States) Blue's Clues	Nine Network	6 September
(United States) Sex and the City	Nine Network	6 September
(United States) Brimstone	Nine Network	6 September
(United Kingdom) Dinnerladies	ABC TV	8 September
(United States) Dilbert	Network Ten	9 September
(United States) Voltron: The Third Dimension	Seven Network	9 September
(United States) Push	Network Ten	9 September
(United States) Red Shoe Diaries	Network Ten	11 September
(United Kingdom) Hallo Aus Berlin	ABC TV	15 September
(United States) The Powerpuff Girls	Seven Network	16 September
(United States) Police Academy: The Series	Nine Network	18 September
(United States) The Martin Short Show	Nine Network	20 September
(United Kingdom) The Wombles (1997)	ABC TV	20 September
(United Kingdom) Bob the Builder	ABC TV	20 September
(United States) / (Canada) Martial Law	Seven Network	25 September
(United States) Significant Others	Network Ten	30 September
(United States) Crusade	Nine Network	30 September
(United Kingdom) Walking with Dinosaurs	ABC TV	17 October
(United Kingdom) Eureka Street	ABC TV	17 October
(United States) Feds	Network Ten	17 October
(United Kingdom) / (Wales) Gogwana	ABC TV	18 October
(United States) The Sopranos	Nine Network	24 October
(United Kingdom) Boiling Point	Nine Network	27 October
(United Kingdom) The Mrs Bradley Mysteries	ABC TV	29 October
(France) / (United Kingdom) Archibald the Koala	ABC TV	10 November
(United Kingdom) Blood on the Carpet	ABC TV	16 November
(South Africa) Shingalana the Little Hunter	Network Ten	20 November
(United Kingdom) Robot Wars	Nine Network	21 November
(United Kingdom) Bill Bryson's Notes from a Small Island	SBS	23 November
(United Kingdom) The Naked Chef	ABC TV	26 November
(United States) Zoe, Duncan, Jack and Jane	Seven Network	28 November
(United States) It's Like, You Know...	Nine Network	29 November
(United States) Turks	Network Ten	29 November
(United States) Hyperion Bay	Nine Network	29 November
(United States) Providence	Seven Network	30 November
(United States) Futurama	Seven Network	2 December
(France) / (Canada) Fly Tales	ABC TV	6 December
(United States) The Norm Show	Nine Network	7 December
(United States) Project G.e.e.K.e.R.	Network Ten	7 December
(United States) That '70s Show	Seven Network	9 December
(United States) Maggie Winters	Nine Network	10 December
(Canada) Eye of the Wolf	ABC TV	12 December
(United States) Wing Commander Academy	Network Ten	14 December
(United States) Hiller and Diller	Seven Network	16 December
(United States) Michael Hayes	Nine Network	16 December
(Republic of Ireland) Voyage	SBS	19 December
(United States) Vengeance Unlimited	Nine Network	23 December
(Austria) / (United States) / (Germany) Catherine the Great	Nine Network	29 December
(United States) Sonic Underground	Seven Network	1999
(Spain) Basket Fever	Seven Network	1999
(United States) Costello	Seven Network	1999
(Australia) Celebrity Drug Disasters Getting Better	Unknown	1999

=== Changes to network affiliation ===
This is a list of programs which made their premiere on an Australian television network that had previously premiered on another Australian television network. The networks involved in the switch of allegiances are predominantly both free-to-air networks or both subscription television networks. Programs that have their free-to-air/subscription television premiere, after previously premiering on the opposite platform (free-to air to subscription/subscription to free-to air) are not included. In some cases, programs may still air on the original television network. This occurs predominantly with programs shared between subscription television networks.

==== Domestic ====
Program	New network(s)	Previous network(s)	Date
Good News Week	Network Ten	ABC TV	21 March

==== International ====
Program	New network(s)	Previous network(s)	Date
(United Kingdom) Brambly Hedge	ABC TV	Nine Network	31 August
(Canada) Adventures in Rainbow Country	Nine Network	ABC TV	19 November
(United States) The Mary Tyler Moore Show	Seven Network	Nine Network	29 November
(United States) / (United Kingdom) Monster Maker	ABC TV	Network Ten	25 December

=== Subscription television ===
==== International ====
Program	Channel	Debut date
(United States) Oh Yeah! Cartoons	Nickelodeon	24 January
(Canada) Animorphs	Nickelodeon	April
(United States) The Brothers Flub	Nickelodeon	5 April
(Canada) Wimzie's House	Nickelodeon	3 May
(Canada) Birdz	Nickelodeon	16 May
(United States) Rocket Power	Nickelodeon	7 December
(United States) The Powerpuff Girls	Cartoon Network	1999
(United States) I am Weasel	Cartoon Network	1999
(United States) / (Canada) Ed, Edd n Eddy	Cartoon Network	1999
(United Kingdom) / (Canada) Bob and Margaret	The Comedy Channel	1999
(United States) The Mr. Potato Head Show	Fox Kids	1999
(United States) Bruno the Kid	Fox Kids	1999
(United Kingdom) The Worst Witch	Nickelodeon	1999
(Canada) Big Wolf on Campus	Fox Kids	1999
(United Kingdom) Stressed Eric	The Comedy Channel	1999
(United Kingdom) Billy	Nickelodeon	1999
(United Kingdom) Wiggly Park	Nickelodeon	1999

=== Changes to network affiliation ===
This is a list of programs which made their premiere on an Australian television network that had previously premiered on another Australian television network. The networks involved in the switch of allegiances are predominantly both free-to-air networks or both subscription television networks. Programs that have their free-to-air/subscription television premiere, after previously premiering on the opposite platform (free-to air to subscription/subscription to free-to air) are not included. In some cases, programs may still air on the original television network. This occurs predominantly with programs shared between subscription television networks.

==== Domestic ====
Program	New network	Previous network	Date
Lift Off	Disney Channel	Fox Kids	2 February

==== International ====
Program	New network	Previous network	Date
(United Kingdom) EastEnders	UKTV	ABC TV	5 February
(Canada) Student Bodies	Fox Kids	Disney Channel	1999

=== Subscription premieres ===
This is a list of programs which made their premiere on Australian subscription television that had previously premiered on Australian free-to-air television. Programs may still air on the original free-to-air television network.

==== Domestic ====
Program	Subscription network	Free-to-air network	Date
Driven Crazy	Nickelodeon	Network Ten	March
(Australia) / (United Kingdom) Minty	Nickelodeon	ABC TV	7 August

==== International ====
Program	Subscription network	Free-to-air network	Date
(United Kingdom) The Forgotten Toys	Nickelodeon	ABC TV	4 October
(United States) 3rd Rock from the Sun	Fox8	Seven Network	21 October
(United States) Family Guy	Fox8	Seven Network	28 November

== Specials ==
Program	Channel	Debut date
(United States) 1999 Kids' Choice Awards	Nickelodeon	29 May
(Australia) Wayne's Best Dares	Nickelodeon	19 September

== Television shows ==
ABC

- Mr. Squiggle and Friends (1959–1999)
- Four Corners (1961–present)

Seven Network

- Wheel of Fortune (1981–1996, 1996–2003, 2004–present)
- Home and Away (1988–2005, 2005–present)
- Blue Heelers (1994–2006)
- The Great Outdoors (1993–present)
- Today Tonight (1995–present)
- All Saints (1998–present)

Nine Network

- Today (1982–present)
- Sale of the Century (1980–2001)
- A Current Affair (1971–1978, 1988–2005, 2006–present)
- Australia's Funniest Home Video Show (1990–2000, 2000–2004, 2005–present)
- The AFL Footy Show (1994–present)
- The NRL Footy Show (1994–present)
- Water Rats (1996–2001)
- Burgo's Catch Phrase (1997–2001, 2002–2003)

Network Ten

- Neighbours (1985–1989, 1989–present)
- GMA With Bert Newton (1991–2005)

== Ending / resting this year ==
Date	Show	Channel	Debut
2 January	The Toothbrush Family (season 2)	Network Ten	1998
2 January	Ketchup: Cats Who Cook	Network Ten	1998
21 January	Wildlife with Olivia Newton-John	Nine Network	1995
22 January	Law of the Land	Nine Network	1993
1 February	Misery Guts	Nine Network	1998
5 February	The Cartoon Connection	Seven Network	1997
19 April	Strassman	Nine Network	1998
23 April	The Adventures of Sam	ABC	29 January 1999
1 May	Big Sky	Network Ten	1997
28 May	11AM	Seven Network	1982
26 June	The Adventures of Lano and Woodley	ABC	1997
2 July	Wildside	ABC	1999
9 July	Mr. Squiggle and Friends	ABC	1959
30 July	Sunrise	Seven Network	1991
28 August	The Mick Molloy Show	Nine Network	10 July 1999
27 September	Live and Kicking	Seven Network	1998
3 November	Breakers	Network Ten	1998
8 November	Dog's Head Bay	ABC	16 August 1999
20 November	Hey Hey It's Saturday	Channel Nine	1971
22 November	Petals	ABC	1998
25 November	What's Cooking?	Nine Network	1991
29 November	Heartbreak High	Network Ten; ABC	1994
13 December	Lift Off	ABC	1992
13 December	Medivac	Network Ten	1996
24 December	What's Up Doc?	Nine Network	1993

== See also ==
- 1999 in Australia
- List of Australian films of 1999
