= List of Australian films of 1998 =

== 1998 ==
Title	Director	Cast	Genre	Notes
15 Amore				
After Mabo	John Hughes		Documentary	
Alienation	Wilma Schinella		Short	
All the Way	Marque Owen	Derek Armistead, Matt Boesenberg	Comedy	
Amy	Nadia Tass	Alana De Roma, Rachel Griffiths, Ben Mendelsohn	Comedy drama	
Babe: Pig in the City	George Miller	Magda Szubanski, James Cromwell	Comedy drama	
Banjo Frogs	Nick Hilligos		Animation / Family	
The Big Night Out	Tim Boyle	Gerald Boyle, Matt Doran, Angus King, Telen Rodwell, Damen Stephenson	Comedy	
Bloodlock			Short	
Bougainville: Our Island, Our Fight			Documentary	
Box				Won AFI for Best Editing (Catherine Chase)
The Boys	Rowan Woods	David Wenham, Toni Collette	Drama	Entered into the 48th Berlin International Film Festival
Bubble Numb			Short	
Cherish			Short	
Chlorine Dreams			Short	
Cold Comfort			Short	
The Collector			Short	
Cousin			Short	
Crackers	David Swann (Writer, and Director)	Peter Rowsthorn, Susan Lyons, Warren Mitchell	Dark Comedy	
Crimes of Fashion			Short	
Dags			Comedy / Romance	
Dance Me to My Song	Rolf de Heer	John Brumpton, Catherine Fitzgerald	Drama	Entered into the 1998 Cannes Film Festival
Dark City	Alex Proyas	Rufus Sewell, Kiefer Sutherland, Jennifer Connelly, William Hurt	Science fiction	
Dead Letter Office	John Ruane	Miranda Otto,	Comedy / Drama	
Deathbed of an Undertaker			Short	
Derwent Envy			Short	
Disturbing Behavior	David Nutter	James Marsden, Katie Holmes	Thriller	
Entertaining Angels			Short	
Fetch			Short	
Forbidden Love			Short	
Freedom Deep			Fantasy	
Game Room			Drama / Thriller	
Gorilla Girls			Short	
Gristle			Short	
Half Mongrel			Short	
Has Beans			Short	
Head On	Ana Kokkinos	Alex Dimitriades, Paul Capsis	Drama	
Heaven on the 4th Floor			Short	
Hephzibah			Documentary	
Hurrah			Drama	
I Want You			Short	
In the Winter Dark			Drama / Horror	
The Interview	Craig Monahan	Hugo Weaving	Thriller	
The Jim Conway Blues			Documentary	
Justice				
Kick			Drama	
The Kiss			Short	
Let's Wait			Short	
A Little Bit of Soul			Comedy	
Little Brother, Little Sister				
Liu Awaiting Spring			Short	
The Loop			Short	
Lost Marbles			Short	
Love Stinks			Short	
Magnum Opus			Short	
Mama Tina			Documentary Short	
Menswear			Short	
Mind's Eye			Short	
Ms Kieran Katt			Short	
My Bed Your Bed			Short	
Occasional Coarse Language			Comedy / Drama	
Otherzone			Short	
Our Park				
Pentuphouse			Short	
The Picture Woman			Short	
Pigeon				
The Pitch			Documentary	
Possum's Rest			Short	
Praise			Drama	
Radiance			Drama	
The Real Macaw			Family / Adventure	Made on location in the Brisbane suburb of Shorncliffe
Reflections				
Relative Strangers			Documentary Short	
Revenge, Inc.			Comedy	
Revisionism			Short	
Rita Storm viharos élete				
Shinsyu Symphony			Documentary	
Sick Puppy			Short	
The Silent Scream				
Sojourn			Short	
Somewhere in the Darkness			Drama	
The Sound of One Hand Clapping	Richard Flanagan		Drama	Entered into the 48th Berlin International Film Festival
Static			Short	
Sticky Date			Short	
The Sugar Factory			Comedy / Drama	
Tears			Short	
Terra Nova			Drama	
They			Short	
Three Chords and a Wardrobe			Short	
Thump			Short	
Tulip			Short	
Two Girls and a Baby			Short	
Two/Out			Short	
Vanish	Ivan Sen		Short	
Vengeance			Short animation	
The Venus Factory	Glenn Fraser		Comedy	
Weird Ones	John Meagher		SciFi/Comedy	pub. Flashback Entertainment DVD

== See also ==
- 1998 in Australia
- 1998 in Australian television
- List of 1998 box office number-one films in Australia
