= 1999 in Australia =

- Monarch: Elizabeth II
- Governor-General: Sir William Deane
- Prime minister: John Howard
- Population: 18,925,855
- Elections: NSW, VIC, Referendum

The following lists events that happened during 1999 in Australia.

- Decades: 1970s; 1980s; 1990s; 2000s; 2010s
- See also: 1999 in Australian television; 1999 in Australian literature; Other events of 1999; Timeline of Australian history

== Incumbents ==
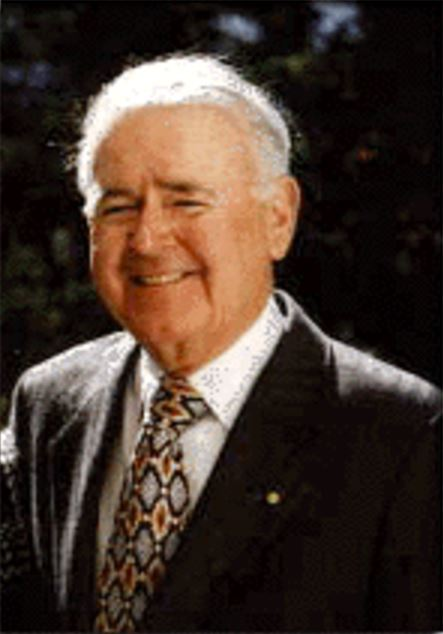
Sir William Deane

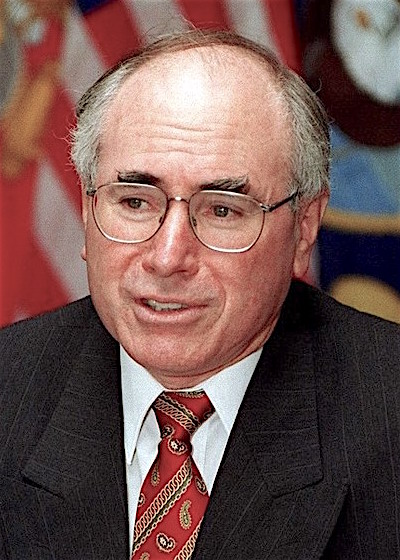
John Howard

- Monarch – Elizabeth II
- Governor-General – Sir William Deane
- Prime Minister – John Howard
  - Deputy Prime Minister – Tim Fischer (until 20 July), then John Anderson
  - Opposition Leader – Kim Beazley
- Chief Justice – Murray Gleeson

=== State and territory leaders ===
- Premier of New South Wales – Bob Carr
  - Opposition Leader – Kerry Chikarovski
- Premier of Queensland – Peter Beattie
  - Opposition Leader – Rob Borbidge
- Premier of South Australia – John Olsen
  - Opposition Leader – Mike Rann
- Premier of Tasmania – Jim Bacon
  - Opposition Leader – Tony Rundle (until 2 July), then Sue Napier
- Premier of Victoria – Jeff Kennett (until 19 October), then Steve Bracks
  - Opposition Leader – John Brumby (until 22 March), then Steve Bracks (until 19 October), then Jeff Kennett (until 26 October), then Denis Napthine
- Premier of Western Australia – Richard Court
  - Opposition Leader – Geoff Gallop
- Chief Minister of the Australian Capital Territory – Kate Carnell
  - Opposition Leader – Jon Stanhope
- Chief Minister of the Northern Territory – Shane Stone (until 8 February), then Denis Burke
  - Opposition Leader – Maggie Hickey (until 2 February), then Clare Martin
- Chief Minister of Norfolk Island – George Smith

=== Governors and administrators ===
- Governor of New South Wales – Gordon Samuels
- Governor of Queensland – Peter Arnison
- Governor of South Australia – Eric Neal
- Governor of Tasmania – Guy Green
- Governor of Victoria – James Gobbo
- Governor of Western Australia – Michael Jeffery
- Administrator of the Australian Indian Ocean Territories – Bill Taylor (from 4 February)
- Administrator of Norfolk Island – Tony Messner
- Administrator of the Northern Territory – Neil Conn

== Events ==
=== January ===
- 1 January - A memorial service is held at Constitution Dock in Hobart to remember the victims of the 1998 Sydney to Hobart Yacht Race.
- 2 January - For the first time, high school graduates in New South Wales can find out their results on the internet.

=== February ===
- 1 February - An unprecedented rush for Telstra shares helps vault Australian share prices to a record high, as investors focus on the continued strong performance of the local economy with the all ordinaries index surging 29.9 points.
- 3 February - An industry review into Queensland's diving industry is released and prompts the Queensland Government to announce its plans to impose jail time or hefty fines on operators falling short of safety requirements.

=== March ===
- 19 March - John Brumby resigns as leader of the Victorian Labor Party.
- 21 March - Channel Nine's 60 Minutes program airs a controversial report which claims that former Prime Minister Paul Keating lied to Parliament about when he divested himself of his joint share in a Darling Downs piggery, as well as accusing him of fleecing his business partner Al Constantinidis of the majority of the profits.
- 22 March -
  - Victorian Shadow Treasurer Steve Bracks becomes leader of the Victorian Labor Party.
  - Tropical Cyclone Vance hits the West Australian coast with winds of 230 km/h. The small coastal town of Exmouth is badly damaged.
  - Dick Smith, chairman of the Civil Aviation Authority resigns, followed by board member Janine Shepherd the following day.
- 23 March - Prime Minister John Howard is criticised by the Opposition and Democrats for his proposal that the concept of "mateship" be introduced into a preamble to the Australian Constitution. He also creates controversy by proposing that Indigenous Australians should be referred to in the preamble as having "inhabited" the land rather than being "custodians" of it.
- 24 March - Media mogul Kerry Packer publicly endorses views that the Federal Government should deregulate the media and abolish cross-media ownership rules which stop Packer from taking over the Fairfax newspaper group, as well as calling for foreign ownership restrictions to be lifted.
- 27 March – The ALP government of Bob Carr is re-elected in the 1999 New South Wales state election.

=== April ===
- 2 April – A rescue mission is launched in an attempt to locate two missing aid workers Peter Wallace and Steve Pratt who were working in Yugoslavia for CARE Australia amid the NATO bombing of Yugoslavia during the Kosovo War. Foreign Minister Alexander Downer confirms the two men had not been seen for four days and says there is suspicion that that the two men have been detained.
- 9 April - The Premiers' Conference results in the signing of a new agreement on Commonwealth-State financial relations which offers the states a guaranteed share of tax revenue in the event that the Senate votes for a GST, thereby negating the need for annual negotiations over how tax revenue should be shared.
- 12 April – Australia accuses Serbia of coercing aid worker Steve Pratt into confessing to spying on Yugoslav television. Foreign minister Alexander Downer accuses Yugoslav authorities of putting words into Pratt's mouth and calls Yugoslavia's ambassador in Australia Dragan Dragojilovic to express outrage.
- 13 April – Foreign minister Alexander Downer describes Australian aid workers Steve Pratt and Peter Wallace as being the innocent victims of "trumped up charged for propaganda purposes" after the two men are formally charged with spying for Australia against Yugoslavia. Prime minister John Howard said the two men were not combatants and Yugoslavia needed to release the men immediately as it was their moral and legal responsibility to do so.
- 14 April – A massive hailstorm hits Sydney, with most of the damage being centred on the Eastern Suburbs. It is the second-costliest natural disaster in Australian history, causing $1.7 billion in insured damages.

=== May ===
- 11 May – The biotechnology industry receives a record $800 million in the federal budget.
- 21 May – Eight decaying bodies are found in barrels in a disused bank vault north of Adelaide, marking the beginning of the Snowtown murders case, which were Australia's worst ever serial killings. More bodies were found underneath a house in Adelaide on 26 May.
- 30 May – A Belgrade court convicts Australian aid workers Steve Pratt and Peter Wallace of espionage. Pratt is sentenced to 12 years in jail while Wallace is sentenced to four years. CARE Australia CEO Charles Tapp condemns the verdict and describing it as "a political verdict" with nothing to do with justice. The two men are ultimately released in September when Yugoslavian president Slobodan Milošević grants them clemency.

=== June ===
- 21 June - Senator Mal Colston joins fellow Independent Brian Harradine in supporting the Federal Government's $17 billion sale of the second portion of Telstra (constituting another 16 per cent), allowing the proposed sale to pass through the Senate and become finalised. After the sale, the Government now owns only 50.1 per cent of Telstra.
- 28 June – The GST bill is passed through the Senate, with the help of most of the Australian Democrats, in exchange for exemptions on fresh food.
- 30 June – Tim Fischer retires as federal leader of the National Party and is replaced by John Anderson the next day.

=== July ===
- 2 July - Liberal for Forests, a breakaway single-issue political party, is established in response to the turmoil in the West Australian Liberal Party on the issue of stopping logging in old-growth forests.
- 5 July - The Commonwealth Director of Public Prosecutions decides to drop the 28 fraud charges against former Senator Mal Colston after receiving two medical specialists' reports which both state that Mr Colston is too ill to face trial, either now or in the future. The decision draws criticism from the Federal Opposition for its timing, due to the fact that Mr Colston was well enough to vote in favour of the Telstra sale the week before.
- 6 July -
  - Prime Minister John Howard meets Japan's Prime Minister Keizo Obuchi in Tokyo for trade talks and publicly expresses his disappointment over Indonesia's 4 July attack upon an international aid convoy which he says has placed Indonesia in the international spotlight.
  - The trial of Federal MP and former West Australian Premier Carmen Lawrence begins in the Perth District Court, where she pleads not guilty to three charges of giving false testimony to the Marks Royal Commission.
- 13 July - ABC-TV's Media Watch programme reveals that radio announcer John Laws had accepted a sponsorship worth $1.2 million from the Banker's Association in return for favourable comments, thereby igniting the cash for comment scandal.
- 22 July - A landmark ruling by the Australian Competition & Consumer Commission forces Telstra to make its telephone network available to competitors such as Optus.
- 23 July - A Perth District Court jury finds former West Australian Premier Carmen Lawrence not guilty of each of the three charges of giving false testimony to the Marks Royal Commission in 1995.
- 27 July –
  - A canyoning disaster at Saxetenbach Gorge near Interlaken in Switzerland. 21 tourists, 14 of them Australian, are killed.
  - The Sisters of Charity and St Vincent's Hospital reach agreement with the New South Wales Government to run an 18-month clinical trial of a medically supervised heroin injecting room to be established in Kings Cross, New South Wales.

=== August ===
- 18 August - The Supreme Court of Queensland rules that One Nation (Australia) was improperly registered at the 1998 Queensland State Election because it did not have the 500 members needed to register as a political party and the Court also finds that the registration was obtained by fraud and deception.
- 26 August – The Prime Minister creates controversy when he avoids the use of the word 'sorry' when a motion was tabled in Parliament expressing 'deep & sincere regret that indigenous Australians suffered injustices under the practises of past generations'.
- 30 August – East Timor votes for independence from Indonesia. In the violence that follows, Australia is a major contributor of peacekeeping forces.

=== September ===
- 1 September – Jailed CARE Australia workers Steve Pratt and Peter Wallace are freed from jail in Belgrade after being granted clemency by Yugoslav President Slobodan Milosevic.
- 2 September – Following their release after spending 154 days in jail, CARE Australia aid workers Steve Pratt and Peter Wallace insist they had not been involved in spying and maintain that they had done nothing wrong. Pratt expresses regret that their humanitation efforts had been disrupted due to a "wartime misunderstanding". He also thanks foreign minister Alexander Downer, prime minister John Howard and the Serbian community in Australia.
- 18 September – In a shock result, Steve Bracks and the Labor Party form a minority government with three rural independents to oust the ruling Liberal/National coalition government of Jeff Kennett in Victoria.

=== November ===
- 3 November – The Reserve Bank announces an interest rate increase of 0.25%, the first since 1994.
- 6 November – A referendum is held to determine whether Australia should become a republic & whether a preamble is inserted into the constitution recognising the Aborigines as Australia's first people. The 'no' vote scores 54% on the republic question & 60% on the preamble question.
- 14 November – In response to the growing number of illegal immigrants, most of whom arrived by boat, the government allows police to board vessels in international waters. On 23 November, refugees were barred from seeking asylum if they had lived somewhere else for more than seven days or had the right to live somewhere else.

=== Undated ===
- Wine Ark, wine storage provider is established.

== Arts and literature ==
- Murray Bail's novel Eucalyptus wins the Miles Franklin Award

== Film ==
- The Craic
- Eye of the Beholder
- Holy Smoke!
- Paperback Hero
- Two Hands

== Television ==
- 1 February – QSTV becomes an affiliate of the Seven Network, becoming known as Seven Central.
- March – WIN Television WA commences broadcasting to regional & remote Western Australia, ending the long-time monopoly held by Golden West Network.
- May – The Seven Network becomes the first Australian television network to introduce a watermark on its programs, which leads to complaints from viewers.
- 11 April – Hosted by Andrew Denton, the 41st annual Logie Awards are held in Melbourne where Lisa McCune wins the Gold Logie and Mike Walsh is inducted into the Logie Hall of Fame.
- 27 October – It's announced the Nine Network's long-running variety program Hey Hey It's Saturday hosted by Daryl Somers has been axed, with the show set to conclude its 28-year run in November.
- 20 November – The last ever episode of Hey Hey It's Saturday goes to air.

== Sport ==
1999 was the year Australia won cricket, rugby, men's tennis and netball world cups in the same year.

- 14 February – Stadium Australia is opened to the public for the first time.
- 6 March – A world record crowd of 104,583 attend the first rugby league matches held at Stadium Australia. The Newcastle Knights defeat the Manly-Warringah Sea Eagles 41–10 & the Parramatta Eels defeat the St George Illawarra Dragons 20–10 in what is also the joint venture team's first match.
- 18 March – First day of the Australian Track & Field Championships for the 1998–1999 season, which are held at the Olympic Park in Melbourne, Victoria. The 10,000 metres was conducted at the Zatopek Classic, Melbourne on 5 December 1998. The men's decathlon event was staged at the Hobart Grand Prix on 25–27 February.
- 5 May – South Melbourne become National Soccer League Champions for a record equaling 4th time, defeating Sydney United 2–1 at Olympic Park.
- 6 June – Tony Lockett becomes the greatest goalscorer in VFL/AFL history by overtaking Gordon Coventry's long held record of 1299 career goals when he scores career goal number 1300 against the Collingwood Magpies at the Sydney Cricket Ground. Tony Lockett announces his retirement on 14 August.
- 20 June – Australia wins the 1999 Cricket World Cup, defeating Pakistan in the final.
- 11 July – Shaun Creighton wins the men's national marathon title, clocking 2:16:03 in Brisbane, while Carolyn Schuwalow claims her second women's title in 2:41:39.
- 27 July – Foundation clubs the Balmain Tigers & Western Suburbs Magpies vote to form the game's second joint venture team, the Wests Tigers. The team start playing as a joint venture in 2000.
- 13 August – The Adelaide Thunderbirds defeat the Adelaide Ravens 62–30 in the Commonwealth Bank Trophy netball grand final
- 28 August
  - Victoria Park hosts its last VFL/AFL match when the Brisbane Lions (13.16.94) defeat Collingwood (8.4.52)
  - The North Sydney Bears play their final match as a first-grade side, defeating the North Queensland Cowboys 28–18.
- 29 August - Waverley Park hosts its last VFL/AFL match when Hawthorn (23.15.153) defeats the Sydney Swans (11.2.68)
- 18 September – In one of the classic matches of Australian rules football, Carlton (16.8.104) defeat Essendon (14.19.103) in the preliminary final.
- 25 September – The Kangaroos (19.10.124) defeat Carlton (12.17.89) to win the 103rd VFL/AFL premiership. It is the first all-Victorian grand final since 1995 & the first time the cup has not been won by the Adelaide Crows since 1996.
- 26 September – A new world record crowd for rugby league is set when 107,961 people attend the first National Rugby League grand final held at Stadium Australia. In one of the most memorable & controversial grand finals in history, the Melbourne Storm, in just their second season of existence, defeat the St George Illawarra Dragons 20–18. The outcome is determined when a penalty try is given to Melbourne's Craig Smith. Melbourne's win means that both the AFL trophy & NRL trophy have been won by teams from the same city for the first time. The Cronulla-Sutherland Sharks are named minor premiers, while the Western Suburbs Magpies, in their final first grade season following their merger with the Balmain Tigers, finish in last position, claiming their second consecutive wooden spoon.
- 3 October – In the third year of the split in the organisation of the Bathurst 1000 the traditional race was held for the last time and won by Paul Morris as the Bathurst 500 was declared after just 310 of the scheduled 500 kilometres due to unrelenting rain. It was a justification for Morris and the BMW team after being disqualified from victory two years ago.
- 10 October – South Sydney supporters rally through the streets of Sydney to protest against the rationalisation of the NRL to 14 teams for 2000.
- 15 October – The South Sydney Rabbitohs are put in lockdown for 2000.
- 2 November – Rogan Josh wins the Melbourne Cup.
- 6 November – Australia wins the 1999 Rugby World Cup, defeating France 35–12 in the final.
- 14 November – Steven Richards and Greg Murphy won the 1999 Bathurst 1000 for Gibson Motorsport

=== Unknown dates ===
- Australia wins the 1999 Netball World Championships, defeating New Zealand in the final.

== Births ==
- 4 January – Zac Stubblety-Cook, swimmer
- 6 January – Eliza Scanlen, actress
- 15 January – Patrick Naish, Australian rules footballer
- 25 January – Jai Waetford, actor and singer
- 17 February – Alex de Minaur, tennis player
- 10 March – Max Bryant, cricketer
- 14 March – Sheldon Riley, singer
- 17 April – Matthew Richardson, cyclist
- 2 June – Campbell Graham, rugby league player
- 4 June – Drew Pavlou, political activist
- 20 June – Matthew Temple, swimmer
- 8 July – Maeve Plouffe, cyclist
- 5 August – Alexei Popyrin, tennis player
- 13 August – Ezi Magbegor, basketball player
- 19 August – Oregon Kaufusi, rugby league player
- 10 September – Laura Taylor, swimmer
- 24 September – Zac Lomax, rugby league player
- 21 November – Isaiah Firebrace, singer
- 2 December – Payne Haas, rugby league player
- 7 December – Bethany Whitmore, actress

== Deaths ==
- 16 January – Jim McClelland, 83, ALP politician
- 6 February – Don Dunstan, 72, former Premier of South Australia
- 24 April – Arthur Boyd, 78, painter
- 10 May – Eric Willis, 77, Premier of New South Wales
- 21 May – Colin Hayes, 75, champion trainer of thoroughbred racehorses
- 6 June – Anne Haddy, 58, actress
- 25 June – Sir Peter Abeles, 75, businessman
- 3 July – Reg Bishop, 86, ALP politician
- 8 July
  - Mavis Thorpe Clark, 90, novelist and writer
  - Malcolm Mackay, 79, Liberal politician
- 17 July – Kevin Newman, 65, Liberal politician
- 28 July – Doris Carter, 87, athlete
- 23 September – Ivan Goff, 89, screenwriter
- 27 October - Harry Kadwell, 97, rugby league footballer
- 29 October – Eric Reece, 90, Premier of Tasmania
- 30 December – Des Renford, 72, Marathon Swimmer

== See also ==
- 1999 in Australian television
- List of Australian films of 1999
