= List of Australian films of 1999 =

== 1999 ==
Title	Director	Cast	Genre	Notes
Above the Dust Level	Carla Drago	Jane Turner, Tobin Saunders, Melinda Dimitriades, Marsha Rosengarten, Elle	Short	
Agnes, Maude & Pearly Too	Erica Glynn		Short comedy drama	
The Astonishing Ashtons	?			
Bangers	Andrew Upton	Cate Blanchett, Lynette Curran	Short	
Being There	Glenn Fraser		Documentary/Sport	
Bigger Than Tina	Neil Foley			
The Book Keeper	Michael Cusack		Short animation	
Break & Enter			Short	
Brother				
Burnout				
Caffeine				
Change of Heart				
Chrissy				
The Craic	Ted Emery	Jimeoin, Alan McKee	Comedy	
The Dark Redemption				
Darwin's Evolutionary Stakes				
The Date		Dan Spielman, Rose Byrne	Short	
The Day Neil Armstrong Walked on the Moon				
Dear Claudia				
Dogwatch				
Driving Home				
Drunken Rumble Story				
Ed Venture				
Emily's Eyes				
Envy				
Erskineville Kings		Hugh Jackman		(see Erskineville Kings)
The Etiquette of Letter-Writing				
The Extra				
Eye of the Beholder	Stephan Elliott	Ewan McGregor, Ashley Judd, Patrick Bergin, Geneviève Bujold, k.d. lang, Jason Priestley		
Feeling Sexy				
Flowergirl				
Flux				
Fresh Air				
Fusion				
Game Room				
Glass Box				
Go Before You Come				
Hang Up				
HeadSpace				
Help Me				
Hindsight				
Holding On				
Holy Smoke!	Jane Campion	Kate Winslet, Harvey Keitel	Drama	
Huntsman 5.1				
I Promise				
I'm a Luxury... But I'm Free Tonight				
In a Savage Land	Bill Bennett	Rufus Sewell, Martin Donovan, Maya Stange	Adventure	
In the Red				
Intermezzo				
Island of the Vampire Birds				
Island Style				
Joseph and the Coat of Many Colors				
Kick				
Komodo	Michael Lantieri	Jill Hennessy, Billy Burke	Thriller	
Kung Fuji				
Lionheart: The Jesse Martin Story				
Little Echo Lost				
Love Lies Bleeding				
The Matrix	The Wachowskis	Keanu Reeves, Laurence Fishburne, Carrie-Anne Moss, Hugo Weaving, Joe Pantoliano	Science fiction action	American-Australian co-production
Max vs the Freeway				
Me Myself I	Pip Karmel	Rachel Griffiths, David Roberts, Sandy Winton, Yael Stone, Shaun Loseby, Trent Sullivan	Comedy, Romance	Australian-French co-production
Midas				
Milk				
The Missing	Manuela Alberti	Rebecca Firth	Drama	
Molokai: The Story of Father Damien				
The Monster				
My Mother Frank				
Navin Wants to Be a Superhero				
Nightmare Man				
Oops!				
The Order				
Original Schtick				
Paperback Hero	Antony J. Bowman	Claudia Karvan, Hugh Jackman	Comedy	
Paradise				
Paradise Bent: Boys Will Be Girls in Samoa				
Passion				
Pearls Before Swine	Richard Wolstencroft		Drama	
Phörpa (a.k.a. The Cup)				
Pilbara Pearl				
Powderburn				
Project Vlad				
The Rabbits				
Redball				
Renzo Piano				
The Reunion				
Rise				
Rotation				
Rural Crisis				
Sadness				
Sally Marshall Is Not an Alien	Mario Andreacchio	Helen Neville, Natalie Vansier	Drama	
Serenity				
Se-tong				
Siam Sunset				
Slim Pickings				
Smile & Wave				
Soft Fruit				
Spank				
Sport				
Stone Forever				
Strange Fits of Passion	Michaela Noonan		Drama	
Strange Planet	Emma-Kate Croghan	Claudia Karvan, Naomi Watts, Tom Long	Comedy	
Structures on Rail				
Sydney: A Story of a City				
Taken				
Taking Care of Elvis				
Theory of the Trojans				
Three to Tango	Damon Santostefano	Matthew Perry, Neve Campbell, Dylan McDermott, Oliver Platt, Cylk Cozart, John C. McGinley, Bob Balaban, Deborah Rush, Kelly Rowan, Rick Gomez, Patrick Van Horn, David Ramsey, Robin Brule, Barbara Gordon, Roger Dunn, Meredith McGeachie, Marni Thompson, Anais Granofsky		
The Tin Man				
Tom's Funeral				
Trinidad				
Two Hands	Gregor Jordan	Heath Ledger, Bryan Brown		
Urban Clan			Documentary	
Whiteys Like Us	Rachel Landers		Documentary	
Wind				

== See also ==
- 1999 in Australia
- 1999 in Australian television
- List of 1999 box office number-one films in Australia
