= Watene =

Watene is a surname of New Zealand Maori origin and may refer to:

- Adam Watene (1977-2008), New Zealand-Cook Islander Rugby League player
- Dallin Watene-Zelezniak (born 1995), New Zealand Rugby League player
- Frank Watene (born 1977), New Zealand Rugby League player
- Puti Tipene Watene (1910-1967), New Zealand Rugby League player and politician
