= 1998 in Australia =

- Monarch: Elizabeth II
- Governor-General: Sir William Deane
- Prime minister: John Howard
- Population: 18,711,271
- Elections: ACT, QLD, TAS, Federal

The following lists events that happened during 1998 in Australia.

- Decades: 1970s; 1980s; 1990s; 2000s; 2010s
- See also: 1998 in Australian television; 1998 in Australian literature; Other events of 1998; Federal election; Timeline of Australian history

== Incumbents ==
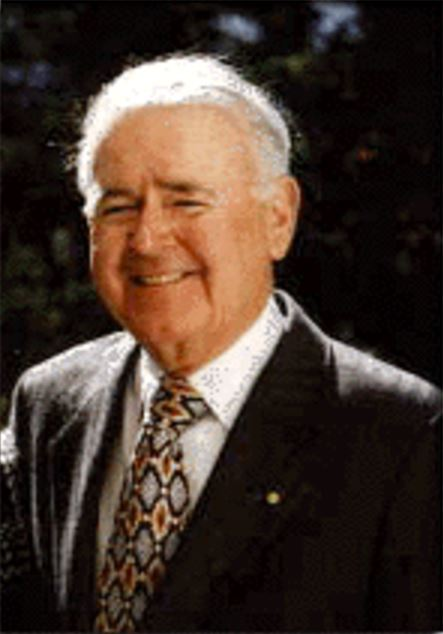
Sir William Deane

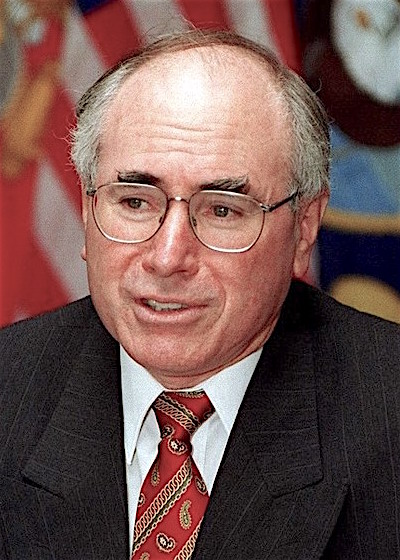
John Howard

- Monarch – Elizabeth II
- Governor-General – Sir William Deane
- Prime Minister – John Howard
  - Deputy Prime Minister – Tim Fischer
  - Opposition Leader – Kim Beazley
- Chief Justice – Sir Gerard Brennan (until 21 May), then Murray Gleeson

=== State and territory leaders ===
- Premier of New South Wales – Bob Carr

naur

- Premier of Queensland – Rob Borbidge (until 20 June), then Peter Beattie
  - Opposition Leader – Peter Beattie (until 20 June), then Rob Borbidge
- Premier of South Australia – John Olsen
  - Opposition Leader – Mike Rann
- Premier of Tasmania – Tony Rundle (until 14 September), then Jim Bacon
  - Opposition Leader – Jim Bacon (until 14 September), then Tony Rundle
- Premier of Victoria – Jeff Kennett
  - Opposition Leader – John Brumby
- Premier of Western Australia – Richard Court
  - Opposition Leader – Geoff Gallop
- Chief Minister of the Australian Capital Territory – Kate Carnell
  - Opposition Leader – Wayne Berry (until 20 February), then Jon Stanhope
- Chief Minister of the Northern Territory – Shane Stone
  - Opposition Leader – Maggie Hickey
- Chief Minister of Norfolk Island – George Smith

=== Governors and administrators ===
- Governor of New South Wales – Gordon Samuels
- Governor of Queensland – Peter Arnison
- Governor of South Australia – Eric Neal
- Governor of Tasmania – Guy Green
- Governor of Victoria – James Gobbo
- Governor of Western Australia – Michael Jeffery
- Administrator of the Australian Indian Ocean Territories – Ronald Harvey (until 30 October)
- Administrator of Norfolk Island – Tony Messner
- Administrator of the Northern Territory – Neil Conn

== Events ==
=== January ===
- 1 January –
  - The body of toddler Jaidyn Leskie is found, more than six months after he went missing.
  - A volunteer New South Wales Rural Fire Service firefighter from Wingello dies and seven others are injured after becoming trapped in their truck while battling a bushfire in the Wingello State Forest.
- 2 January – A helicopter carrying Australian Foreign Minister Alexander Downer makes an emergency landing in the Bougainville hinterland after its windscreen is smashed in a bird strike. Downer was travelling to Arawa to meet senior leaders of the Bougainville Revolutionary Army.
- 5 January –
  - In an address to the American Bar Association in Hawaii, Australia Attorney-General Daryl Williams is criticised by Justice Michael Kirby for failing to defend the High Court of Australia against political attacks especially after the Wik decision.
  - Around 100 staff members are sacked by Mayne Nickless after the company closes its Ipec depot at Campbellfield in Melbourne.
- 7 January – Prime Minister John Howard declines an offer to meet with British pop group, The Spice Girls.
- 11 January – Pope John Paul II awards a papal knighthood to Australian media magnate Rupert Murdoch who is officially made a Knight of St. Gregory the Great by the Catholic Church in Los Angeles.
- 25 January – American tourists Tom and Eileen Lonergan are unintentionally left behind on the Great Barrier Reef after a scuba diving trip.
- 26 January – In the aftermath of Cyclone Les, the town of Katherine in the Northern Territory begins to be affected by torrential rain causing major flooding which eventually claims the lives of three people.
- 28 January – Prime Minister John Howard unveils a new plan for training, education and expansion of the Work for the Dole Scheme aimed at easing youth unemployment. Howard's plan is criticised by the president of the Australian Council of Social Service Michael Raper.
- 29 January – A man opens fire at a real estate agency in the Perth suburb of Mundaring, killing his estranged wife and seriously injuring another staff member as well as a customer before fleeing. He crashes his car and then attempts suicide by shooting himself but was taken to Swan Districts Hospital in a serious condition.
- 30 January – Prime Minister John Howard visits the flood ravaged town of Katherine in the Northern Territory as flood waters claim their first victim.

=== February ===
- 1 February – Some Sunday newspapers publish a Libra advertisement for ultra-absorbent menstrual pads accompanied by a caption which reads "Katherine could use some of these right now" while also depicting a flooded home. Northern Territory Deputy Chief Minister Mike Reed criticises the ads describing them as "un-Australian" and calls on the company to apologise. General manager of Sancellar Pty Ltd, the makers of Libra products, unreservedly apologises and commits $25,000 for the town's Red Cross appeal.
- 2 – 13 February – Constitutional Convention is held to decide which model of republic should be put before the people of Australia in a referendum. The model chosen is one where the president is chosen by a joint sitting of both houses of parliament
- 4 February – The Federal Government gives short-term credit insurance to exporters to Indonesia to counter-act the effect of Indonesia's economic problems.
- 5 February – High Court of Australia judge Ian Callinan is accused of bias in the High Court challenge of the Hindmarsh Bridge.
- 21 February – Elections in the ACT re-elect the Liberal Party government of Kate Carnell. It would be the last State or Territory election that the Liberal Party have managed to form government after until the Western Australia state election in September 2008.
- 23 February–March – After generator breakdowns at four major coal-fired power stations, rolling blackouts hit the city of Brisbane and much of South-East Queensland.

=== March ===
- 3 March – Federal Speaker of the House of Representatives Bob Halverson resigns.
- 8 March – New South Wales Premier Bob Carr opens the Olympic Park Station on the new rail link between Sydney and the site for the 2000 Olympics.
- 12 March – The Federal Opposition alleges that Mining and Resources Minister Warwick Parer increased his ownership of a mining company during the first year of the Howard Government's office.
- 16 March – Prime Minister John Howard pledges a $50 million crime database investment if the Liberal Party is re-elected.
- 17 March – The Federal Government announces sweeping reforms to business rules to attract overseas companies to Australia.

=== April ===
- 2 April – Prime Minister John Howard pledges $270 million to keep the aged in their own homes and win back their support.
- 7 April – 3 June – Patrick Corporation sacks 2,000 dock workers to try to improve efficiency on the waterfront. In response, the Maritime Union of Australia stages possibly the largest industrial dispute Australia has ever seen. In the end, the jobs are restored to the workers in exchange for improvements in efficiency.
- 25 April –
  - Prime Minister John Howard joins former prisoners of war in a ceremony at Hellfire Pass in Thailand, paying tribute to those who died building the Thai-Burma railway.
  - After attending that morning's Anzac Day commemorations, 16-year-old Air Force Cadet Rachel Antonio goes missing from the North Queensland town of Bowen after being dropped off at the local cinema to see an evening movie.

=== May ===
- 5 May – Fires caused by unsafe fuel hoses aboard the replenishment ship HMAS Westralia kill four people.
- 14 May – Prime Minister John Howard cuts defence ties and suspends all but the most vital humanitarian aid to India after the country carries out two more nuclear tests.
- 18 May – The value of the Australian dollar slumps to 62 and a quarter US cents, its lowest level in 12 years. In a radio interview, Prime Minister John Howard attributes the fall in value on "poorly informed, economically illiterate money market people on the other side of the world".
- 22 May – The Federal Court of Australia blocks construction of the Jabiluka uranium mine, granting to the traditional owners of the land a temporary injunction against work on the mine entrance.
- 24 May –
  - Prime Minister John Howard opens the new Central Synagogue in Sydney to replace the former synagogue which burnt down in 1994.
  - Christopher Skase's passport is seized by Spanish officials and cancelled. Skase applies for a renewal of his Spanish residency, which expired on 13 May and the Federal Government asks Spanish authorities to refuse the application, hoping it will force him home.
- 26 May – The first National Sorry Day is observed, on the first anniversary of the tabling of the report Bringing them Home which was the result of an inquiry into the removal of Aboriginal and Torres Strait Islander children from their families (the Stolen Generation). The day was held annually until 2004. It was renamed National Day of Healing from 2005.
- 27 May – The Australian Labor Party criticises the Queensland Coalition Government for its decision to put Pauline Hanson's One Nation party ahead of the Labor Party on how to vote papers for the upcoming Queensland State Election.
- 30 May – Prime Minister John Howard expresses Australia's concern about Pakistan's nuclear tests.

=== June ===
- 1 June – The Terminus Hotel in Wodonga, Victoria, burns down.
- 13 June – The Queensland state elections depose the ruling National Party government of Rob Borbidge & elect a minority ALP government, led by Peter Beattie. Pauline Hanson's One Nation scored 23% of the vote & 11 seats, leading to anti-racism protests & four former Prime Ministers to sign an open letter rejecting racism.
- 26 June 1998 – While awaiting trial on child sex charges, former New South Wales state MP and former mayor of Wollongong Frank Arkell is murdered by Mark Valera. In 2000, Valera is found guilty of murdering Arkell and David O'Hearn and sentenced to two term of life imprisonment.
- 30 June – The Mercy Hospital in Albury, New South Wales, closes down its maternity unit. From 1 July, all babies are now born at the Wodonga Hospital in Wodonga, Victoria.

=== July ===
- 11 July – The Telstra sale bill is defeated in the Senate. Prime Minister John Howard states the full sale of Telstra is still on the agenda for the next election.
- 15 July – Prime Minister John Howard stands firm against a Coalition backbench revolt on the full sale of Telstra. Howard informs Parliament that the Government is committed to the Telstra sale.
- 21 July – Federal Treasurer Peter Costello admits he has been approached to challenge John Howard for the leadership of the Liberal Party. Talk of the challenge overshadows a Cabinet meeting in regional Victoria.
- 21 July – 5 September – A rapidly evolving water crisis occurs in Sydney, due to the suspected contamination of the microscopic pathogens cryptosporidium and giardia in the water supply, prompting authorities to instruct residents to boil all their tap water before using it.
- 22 July – The Federal Government bows to the mounting pressure from backbenchers and rural voters by placing a 49% cap on the sale of Telstra.
- 26 July – Premier Bob Carr promises to help the victims of flooding in Narrabri, Wee Waa and Gunnedah with the damage bill expected to top $100 million.

=== August ===
- 13 August – The Coalition Tax Reform Package is launched and includes a 10 percent GST with the proceeds to be distributed to the states. Income tax will be lowered and the wholesale sales tax abolished, along with certain taxes on financial transactions.
- 16 August – Silk–Miller police murders: Two Victoria Police officers, Gary Michael Silk, 34, and Rodney James Miller, 35, are murdered in Moorabbin, Victoria.
- 17 August – Illawarra floods
- 29 August – The Liberal Party government of Tony Rundle is voted out in Tasmania & replaced with an ALP government of Jim Bacon.
- 31 August – President of Ireland, Mary McAleese arrives in Perth to begin an 11-day visit to Australia.

=== September ===
- 17 September – Prime Minister John Howard is involved in a heated off-air exchange with ABC staff in Perth following a radio interview on 720 6WF in which he is asked by Mornings presenter Verity James about whether a GST would affect the price of heroin. An angry Howard states: "The suggestion that in some way the GST is linked to heroin is just about the most bizarre thing I've heard and I want an apology from the ABC without qualification, and I expect to get it." Both James and the state manager of the ABC in Western Australia Steve Altham unreservedly apologise to Howard in a letter, where they admitted a mistake had been made after briefing material had been misread. ABC managing director Brian Johns later states the incident was regrettable.
- 23 September – Federal Opposition Leader Kim Beazley launches Labor's election policy at the Brisbane Convention Centre, promising funding to a new jobs plan. Prime Minister John Howard dismisses Mr. Beazley's job target as unrealistic.
- 25 September – A fire at Esso's Longford plant killed 2, injured 8 & left most of Victoria without gas for two weeks. Hundreds of businesses were affected.

=== October ===
- 3 October – With the help of One Nation preferences, John Howard's Liberal/National coalition government is re-elected in the federal election.

=== November ===
- 6 November – The City of Rockhampton, the first of Queensland Rail's Electric Tilt Trains enters service, leading to the eventual demise of the Spirit of Capricorn.
- 12 November – State Premiers and Territory Chief Ministers meet in Canberra with Prime Minister John Howard to discuss the sharing of funds from a goods and services tax.
- 15 November – Prime Minister John Howard arrives in Kuala Lumpur, Malaysia for the APEC Conference.
- 20 November – The High Court of Australia decides to allow uranium mining to proceed at Jabiluka in the Northern Territory.
- 29 November – Prime Minister John Howard joins in celebrations to mark the 50th anniversary of the first Holden motor car.

=== December ===
- December – A man posts 28 mail bombs at a Canberra post office after losing a legal battle with the Australian Taxation Office which had been going since 1994. One of the bombs explodes, injuring two workers.
- 1 December – The Federal Government rejects an attempt by UNESCO to suspend construction of the Jabiluka uranium mine pending a further environmental impact report.
- 2 December – The Linton bushfire kills five volunteer firefighters in Linton, Victoria.
- 4 December – Colin Dunstan, aged 43, is arrested for the tax office mail bomb campaign.
- 14 December – New South Wales Premier Bob Carr opens extra lanes on the road the runs from Penrith to Strathfield.
- 19 December – A fire breaks out at the Country Comfort hotel in Albury, New South Wales, spreading up to the top floor.
- 20 December – Christopher Skase is rushed to a Majorca hospital just days after a Spanish court lifts an order preventing his deportation.

=== Full date unknown ===
- The Wiggles re-release three videos after the video release of The Wiggles Movie, including Yummy Yummy, Wiggle Time, and Wiggledance!. However, Yummy Yummy and Wiggle Time contains new footage, as they have been re-recorded, Wiggledance! cuts out the song "Vini Vini".
- Wilkins Farago book publishing house is founded in Melbourne.

== Arts and literature ==
- Peter Carey (novelist) won the Miles Franklin Award for Jack Maggs

== Film ==
- 2 May – Fox Studios Australia opens in Sydney on the site of the former Sydney Showgrounds.
- 20 August – The Interview
- 10 December – Babe: Pig in the City

== Television ==
- 16 February – Long running British preschool series Teletubbies premieres on ABC.
- 27 March – Darwin finally gets a second commercial television station when TND-34 opens, taking a Seven Network affiliation.
- WIN Television WA is granted a licence to broadcast to regional & remote Western Australia to commence transmission in 1999.
- 27 November – After 25 years, The Midday Show is axed by the Nine Network.
- 5 October – Pokémon begins on Network Ten.
- December – The remote Central & Eastern Australia markets are aggregated, with Imparja taking a Nine Network affiliation & Seven Central (formerly QSTV) taking a joint Seven & Network Ten affiliation.

== Sport ==
=== Australian rules football ===
- 26 September – The Adelaide Crows (15.15.105) defeat North Melbourne (8.22.70) to win the 102nd VFL/AFL premiership.
- The Brownlow Medal is awarded to Robert Harvey of St Kilda
- The Leigh Matthews Trophy is awarded to Wayne Carey of North Melbourne
- The Coleman Medal is awarded to Tony Lockett of Sydney Swans
- The Norm Smith Medal is awarded to Andrew McLeod of Adelaide Crows
- The AFL Rising Star award is awarded to Byron Pickett of North Melbourne
- The Wooden Spoon is 'awarded' to Brisbane

=== Soccer ===
- 16 May – South Melbourne become Australian Champions for the third time in their history, beating newly formed Carlton SC in the National Soccer League Grand Final at Olympic Park, 2-1. The game is marred by brawling soccer fans who invade the playing arena, throw flares and rip up seating prompting Victoria Police to consider increasing police presence and introducing CCTV to monitor crowd behaviour for future games at the venue.

=== Rugby league ===
- 13 March – The NRL competition kicks off, with the South Sydney Rabbitohs upsetting the Auckland Warriors 24–18 at Ericsson Stadium.
- 14 March – In their first match, the Melbourne Storm upset the Illawarra Steelers 14–12 at WIN Stadium. The Storm go on to have a remarkable debut season, going within one game of the grand final.
- 24 April – The Kangaroos play their first 'full-fledged' international match in four years as they play the Kiwis who defeat Australia 22–16.
- 12 June – Rugby league rocked by drugs scandal. Three Newcastle Knights players test positive, as do one Melbourne player & a Western Suburbs player.
- 23 September – The St. George Dragons & the Illawarra Steelers announce they will form the game's first joint venture team, the St George Illawarra Dragons.
- 27 September – Minor premiers the Brisbane Broncos defeat the Canterbury Bulldogs 38–12 to win the 91st NSWRL/ARL/NRL premiership. Gordon Tallis is awarded the Clive Churchill Medal. It is the first premiership held under the NRL name & the last grand final to be played at the Sydney Football Stadium (now Aussie Stadium). It is also the second consecutive premiership for the Broncos following their success in the 1997 Super League. The Western Suburbs Magpies finish in last position on points difference and points against, claiming the wooden spoon.
- 1 & 3 December – The Adelaide Rams & the Gold Coast Chargers are eliminated from the NRL competition for 1999.

=== Cricket ===
- 16 October – Mark Taylor equals Don Bradman's record of 334 in a test match against Pakistan. However, unlike Bradman, Taylor is not out & declares the innings closed when he reaches that score.
- 9 December – Shane Warne & Mark Waugh publicly confess to accepting money from an Indian bookmaker when the Australian cricket team was on tour in Pakistan & Sri Lanka in 1994.

=== Swimming ===
- 8 to 17 January – The 8th FINA World Championships are held in Perth. Ian Thorpe wins his first gold medal at a major meet in the 400m freestyle. Human growth hormone was found in a Chinese swimmer Yuan Yuan's bag at Sydney Airport, resulting in her deportation.

=== Motor sport ===
- 8 March – Finnish driver Mika Häkkinen wins a controversial Australian Grand Prix ahead of McLaren teammate Scot David Coulthard after Coulthard moved over and allowed Häkkinen to take the race lead in the closing stages of the race.
- 4 October – Mick Doohan riding a Honda NSR500 won his third and final Australian motorcycle Grand Prix at the Phillip Island Grand Prix Circuit. The win secured Doohan's fifth consecutive World Championship victory.
- 4 October – Jim Richards and Swede Rickard Rydell win the Bathurst 1000 in their TWR prepared Volvo S40, defeating Richards' son Steven Richards and Brit Matt Neal in a Nissan Primera by the smallest competitive margin in the races history. It was Richards' sixth Bathurst victory.
- 8 November – Finnish driver Tommi Mäkinen won his second Rally Australia driving a Mitsubishi Lancer.
- 15 November – Jason Bright and Steven Richards in a Ford Falcon take victory in the Bathurst Classic, the first major victory for Stone Brothers Racing team.

=== Commonwealth Games ===
- September – Australia comes home with a record 199 medals, 80 of them gold from the 1998 Commonwealth Games held in Kuala Lumpur, Malaysia.

=== Netball ===
- 7 August – The Adelaide Thunderbirds defeat the Sydney Swifts 48–42 in the Commonwealth Bank Trophy netball grand final

=== Horse racing ===
- 3 November – Jezabeel wins the Melbourne Cup.

=== Miscellaneous ===
- 19 February – Zali Steggall wins bronze in the women's slalom at the 1998 Winter Olympics in Nagano, Japan. It is Australia's first ever individual Winter Olympic medal.
- 13 March – First day of the Australian Track & Field Championships for the 1997–1998 season, which are held at the Olympic Park in Melbourne, Victoria. The 10,000 metres was conducted at the Zatopek Classic, Melbourne on 18 December 1998 and the men's decathlon event was staged at the Hobart Grand Prix on 21 – 22 February.
- 1 June – Susie Maroney becomes the first person to swim from Mexico to Cuba, setting a new world distance ocean swimming record.
- 12 July – Greg Lyons wins the men's national marathon title, clocking 2:17:00 in Brisbane, while Lisa Dick claims her second women's title in 2:36:54.
- 26 December – The 1998 Sydney to Hobart Yacht Race begins with warnings of a severe storm expecting to produce 40-knot winds, rain and mountainous swells during the first night. An hour after the starter's gun, the Bureau of Meteorology issues a priority storm warning for coastal waters south of Merimbula, which is expected to produce gales of up to 55 knots the following day. Despite the warnings, the race continues which results in six fatalities, the destruction of five yachts and the rescue of 55 sailors.

== Births ==
- 1 January – Lara Robinson, actress
- 2 January – Jake Clifford, rugby league player
- 14 January – Maddison Inglis, tennis player
- 15 January – Alexandra Eade, artistic gymnast
- 16 January
  - Cameron Murray, rugby league player
  - Jai Whitbread, rugby league player
- 17 January – Sophie Molineux, cricketer
- 5 February – Sara Tomic, tennis player
- 12 February – Bilal Maarbani, rugby league player
- 17 February – Harry Grant, rugby league player
- 24 February – Tom Highmore, Australian Rules footballer
- 12 March – Jordan Jansen, singer
- 14 March – Victor Radley, rugby league player
- 30 March – Kalyn Ponga, rugby league player
- 1 April – Isabella Bliss, chef
- 3 April – Max Purcell, tennis player
- 16 April – Jordana Beatty, actress
- 22 April – Reed Mahoney, rugby league player
- 29 April – Kimberly Birrell, German-born Australian tennis player
- 30 April
  - Oliver Anderson, tennis player
  - Olivia DeJonge, actress
- 10 May – Priscilla Hon, tennis player
- 25 may – Andrew Lambrou, singer
- 27 May – Brittany O'Brien, diver
- 9 June – Moses Suli, rugby league player
- 24 July – Bindi Irwin, television presenter
- 1 August – Pasami Saulo, rugby league player
- 5 August – Adam Doueihi, rugby league player
- 15 August – Gulliver McGrath, actor
- 19 August – Salesi Junior Fainga'a, rugby league player
- 21 August – Sean O'Sullivan, rugby league player
- 1 September – Emily Condon, footballer
- 2 September – Gehamat Shibasaki, rugby league player
- 9 September – Alexander Brimson, rugby league player
- 19 October – Enari Tuala, rugby league player
- 29 October – Kotoni Staggs, rugby league player
- 3 November – Maddison Elliott, swimmer
- 18 November – Nick Cotric, rugby league player
- 8 December – Shai Bolton, Australia Rules footballer

== Deaths ==
- 1 January – Lionel Long, singer and actor (b. 1939)
- 16 January – Alphonse Gangitano, underworld criminal (b. 1957)
- 22 January – Chilla Christ, cricketer (b. 1911)
- 27 January – Kay Kinane, educational broadcaster (b. 1912)
- 25 February – B. A. Santamaria, political activist and journalist (b. 1915)
- 15 March – Afferbeck Lauder, author (b. 1911)
- 28 April – Mum Shirl, Indigenous activist (b. 1924)
- 13 June – Kathleen Funder, social scientist and researcher (b. 1941)
- 26 June – Frank Arkell, politician and accused paedophile (b. 1935)
- 17 July –
  - Marc Hunter, singer, songwriter and record producer (born in New Zealand) (b. 1953)
  - Adam Wright, rugby league player (b. 1974)
- 2 September – Tommy J. Smith, racehorse trainer (b. 1916)
- 4 September – Elizabeth Kata, author (b. 1912)
- 9 October – Ian Johnson, cricketer (b. 1917)
- 21 November – Sir Otto Frankel, geneticist (born in Austria) (b. 1900)

== See also ==
- 1998 in Australian television
- List of Australian films of 1998
