= Strassman =

Strassman may refer to:

- Karen Strassman, American voice actress
- David Strassman, American ventriloquist
- Marcia Strassman, American actress
- Rick Strassman, American psychedelic researcher
- Toni Strassman, American literary agent
- Harvey D. Strassman, American psychiatrist
- Todd Strassman, bass player for the band What Is This?
- Fritz Strassmann, German chemist
- 19136 Strassmann, asteroid
- Strassmann's theorem
