= Adam Watene =

Cook Islands rugby league footballer

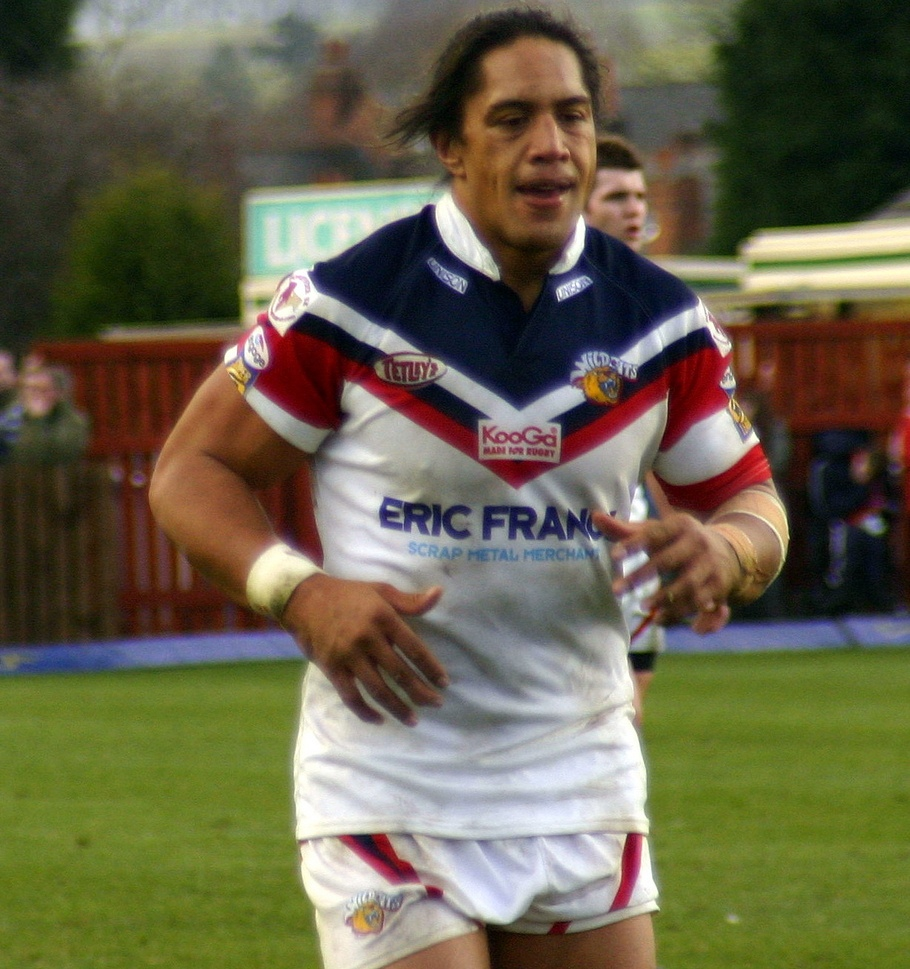

Personal information
- Born: Adam Cook; 7 October 1977 New Zealand
- Died: 13 October 2008 (aged 31) Wakefield, West Yorkshire, England

Playing information
- Height: 6 ft 2 in (1.88 m)
- Weight: 17 st 0 lb (108 kg)
- Position: Prop
Club
Years	Team	Pld	T	G	FG	P
2005	Castleford Tigers	28	6	0	0	24
2006	Bradford Bulls	4	0	0	0	0
2006–08	Wakefield Trinity Wildcats	58	6	0	0	24
	Total	90	12	0	0	48
Representative
Years	Team	Pld	T	G	FG	P
2000–06	Cook Islands	3	0	0	0	0
- Source: As of 4 May 2008
- Relatives: Frank Watene (brother)

Adam Watene (7 October 1977 – 13 October 2008), known as Adam Cook early in his career, also known by the nicknames of "Morlock", "Monster", and "The Gentle Giant", was a Cook Islands international rugby league footballer who played in the 2000s. He played at club level in Australia for the Wynnum Manly Seagulls, Burleigh Bears, and in England for the Castleford Tigers, the Bradford Bulls and the Wakefield Trinity Wildcats as a prop.

== Background ==
Watene was born in New Zealand. He was of Maori, and Cook Islander descent.

He grew up with fellow rugby league footballer, Adam Wright. Adam was the younger brother of rugby league footballer, Frank Watene.

== Career ==
As Adam Cook he won caps for Cook Islands in the 2000 Rugby League World Cup.

Watene played for Wynnum Manly Seagulls and Burleigh Bears in the Queensland Cup in Australia before moving to the UK in 2005 to join the Castleford Tigers in National League One. In his last season with the Burleigh Bears he won the 2004 Queensland Cup. His move to Castleford was in doubt because of visa issues which led to him being chased by the Gateshead Thunder but eventually he joined Castleford.

In 2005 Watene helped the Castleford Tigers gain promotion to Super League and played alongside his brother Frank Watene. He was signed by Brian Noble in 2006 for the Bradford Bulls but only spent one year at the club before leaving for the Wakefield Trinity Wildcats. In 2007 Watene had an outstanding season, despite missing part of the year due to injury and the death of his father.

== Death ==
On 13 October 2008 Wakefield announced that he died of a suspected heart attack at the age of 31 after collapsing during a weight training session in the gym.

Jason Demetriou wore Watene's number 8 jersey in the season after Watene's death to honour his memory.

== Personal life ==
Watene had a wife, Moana Watene, and two children.

At the time of his death he held the ceremonial position of the consort of Wakefield's deputy mayor, Heather Hudson.

== Legacy ==
Two of Watene's former clubs in each hemisphere compete for specially commissioned trophies named in his honour: Since 2009 Castleford Tigers and Wakefield Trinity have chosen one of their fixtures to contest the Adam Watene trophy, and in the Southern Hemisphere Burleigh Bears and Wynnum Manly Seagulls play annually for the Adam Watene trophy.
