= Woollahra Public School =

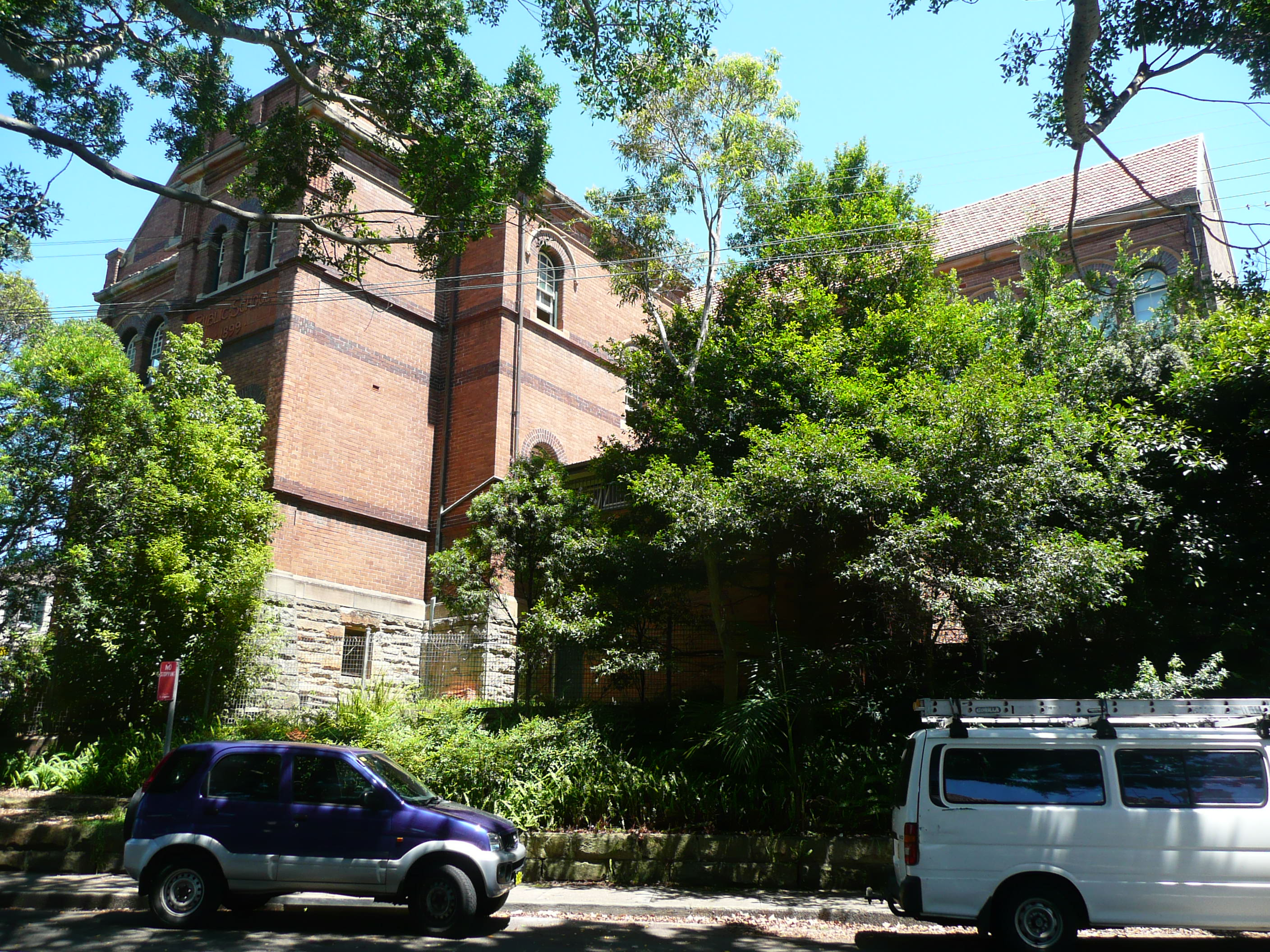
- Woollahra Public School

Location
- Forth Street, Woollahra; Sydney, New South Wales; Australia; 33°53′11″S 151°14′28″E

Information
- Type: Public, co-educational, day school
- Established: 1879
- Principal: Heather Strachan
- Teaching staff: 55
- Enrollment: 700 (K–6) (2014)
- Campus: Metropolitan (Woollahra)
- Website: woollahra-p.schools.nsw.gov.au/

Woollahra Public School, (previously known as Woollahra Demonstration School), is a main school located in Forth Street, Woollahra, Sydney, Australia.

== Description ==
Woollahra Public is one of the oldest public schools in Sydney, having opened in 1878. It was designed by W. Kemp and J. Wigram, and is listed on the Register of the National Estate. It celebrated its centenary in 1978 and a time capsule was buried in the grounds.

Woollahra Public offers education for local students from Kindergarten to Year 6. Since the 1930s it has designated some Year 5 and 6 classes as opportunity classes. Each Opportunity Class holds 30 students, with placement granted to pupils of Eastern Suburbs schools as determined by an academic exam in Year 4. The scheme has long been divisive because of its preference for non-local students, and for siphoning students from other schools.

== History ==
Woollahra Public School was formally opened in 1879 with 300 children enrolled into three rooms. In 1891, extensions to the original Chisholm building were completed, and the enrolment was 1200. The school was changed to Woollahra Superior Public School to cater for the older and more senior students. A second two-storey building, Barton, was completed in the early 1900s, and a third in 1923.

Since the 1930s, Woollahra has offered the Opportunity (OC) classes in Years 5 and 6 for students outside the school catchment. In 1961, due to their contribution to teacher education, the school's name was changed to Woollahra Demonstration School. The name was changed to Woollahra Public School as the Alexander Mackie Teachers College moved to Oatley in 1979, detaching their teaching program from the school.

In 1978, artist Garry Shead designed and painted a two-storey mural featuring Central Australia's Olga Mountains to celebrate the school's centenary. The mural, on the western side of the Chisholm building, has since been covered up by further building works and left to decay.

== Notable alumni ==
- Lana Cantrell – singer
- Sir John L. Carrick – WWII military officer and politician
- Justine Clarke – actress and musician
- Stephen Duckett – health service manager and academic
- Glenn Fraser – filmmaker
- Deni Hines – musician and actress
- Anna Katzmann – judge
- Mouche Phillips – actress
