= List of 1999 box office number-one films in Australia =

This is a list of films which placed number-one at the weekend box office in Australia during 1999. Amounts are in Australian dollars.

(N.B.: Seemingly improper dates are due to holiday weekends or other occasions.)

== Number-one films ==
†	This implies the highest-grossing movie of the year.

#	Weekend end date	Film	Total weekend gross in AUS	Notes
1	3 January 1999	You've Got Mail	Missing	
2	10 January 1999	Enemy of the State	$1,974,621	
3	17 January 1999	Rush Hour	$2,832,057	
4	24 January 1999	The Waterboy	$3,317,301	
5	31 January 1999	The Waterboy	$1,586,736	
6	7 February 1999	Practical Magic	$1,624,528	
7	14 February 1999	Shakespeare in Love	$1,826,344	
8	21 February 1999	Shakespeare in Love	$1,398,945	
9	28 February 1999	Shakespeare in Love	$1,206,450	
10	7 March 1999	Payback	$1,957,910	
11	14 March 1999	Analyze This	$1,453,302	
12	21 March 1999	Analyze This	$1,238,789	
13	28 March 1999	Patch Adams	$1,509,197	
14	5 April 1999	The Rugrats Movie	$2,165,512	
15	11 April 1999	The Matrix	$4,248,854	
16	18 April 1999	The Matrix	$3,112,551	
17	26 April 1999	The Matrix	$2,844,378	
18	2 May 1999	The Matrix	$1,621,294	
19	9 May 1999	Forces of Nature	$1,712,996	
20	16 May 1999	Forces of Nature	$1,318,337	
21	23 May 1999	EDtv	$974,083	
22	30 May 1999	EDtv	$900,300	
23	6 June 1999	Star Wars: Episode I – The Phantom Menace †	$9,139,628	
24	13 June 1999	Star Wars: Episode I – The Phantom Menace †	$7,593,705	
25	20 June 1999	Austin Powers: The Spy Who Shagged Me	$5,718,323	
26	27 June 1999	The Mummy	$3,801,425	
27	4 July 1999	The Mummy	$2,661,580	
28	11 July 1999	Entrapment	$2,431,231	
29	18 July 1999	South Park: Bigger, Longer & Uncut	$2,433,415	
30	25 July 1999	South Park: Bigger, Longer & Uncut	$1,355,393	
31	1 August 1999	Two Hands	$807,647	
32	8 August 1999	Eyes Wide Shut	$2,569,140	
33	15 August 1999	Eyes Wide Shut	$1,232,382	
34	22 August 1999	Runaway Bride	$1,655,433	
35	29 August 1999	Runaway Bride	$2,304,117	
36	5 September 1999	Runaway Bride	$1,446,723	
37	12 September 1999	Wild Wild West	$1,885,112	
38	19 September 1999	Big Daddy	$2,704,238	
39	26 September 1999	Big Daddy	$2,100,361	
40	3 October 1999	Deep Blue Sea	$2,842,060	
41	10 October 1999	The Sixth Sense	$4,658,377	
42	17 October 1999	The Sixth Sense	$4,135,912	
43	24 October 1999	The Sixth Sense	$3,232,964	
44	31 October 1999	The Sixth Sense	$2,231,617	
45	7 November 1999	The Sixth Sense	$1,679,645	
46	14 November 1999	The Sixth Sense	$1,296,920	
47	21 November 1999	The Bone Collector	$1,637,837	
48	28 November 1999	The World Is Not Enough	$3,772,863	
49	5 December 1999	Toy Story 2	$2,137,937	
50	12 December 1999	The Blair Witch Project	$3,628,651	
51	19 December 1999	Pokémon: The First Movie	$2,054,626	
52	28 December 1999	End of Days	$3,760,107	

== See also ==
- List of Australian films — Australian films by year
