= Wine Ark =

Australian wine storage provider

- Type: Wine Storage
- Industry: Wine
- Founded: 1998
- Founder: Dean Taylor
- Headquarters: Sydney, Australia
- Services: Wine storage

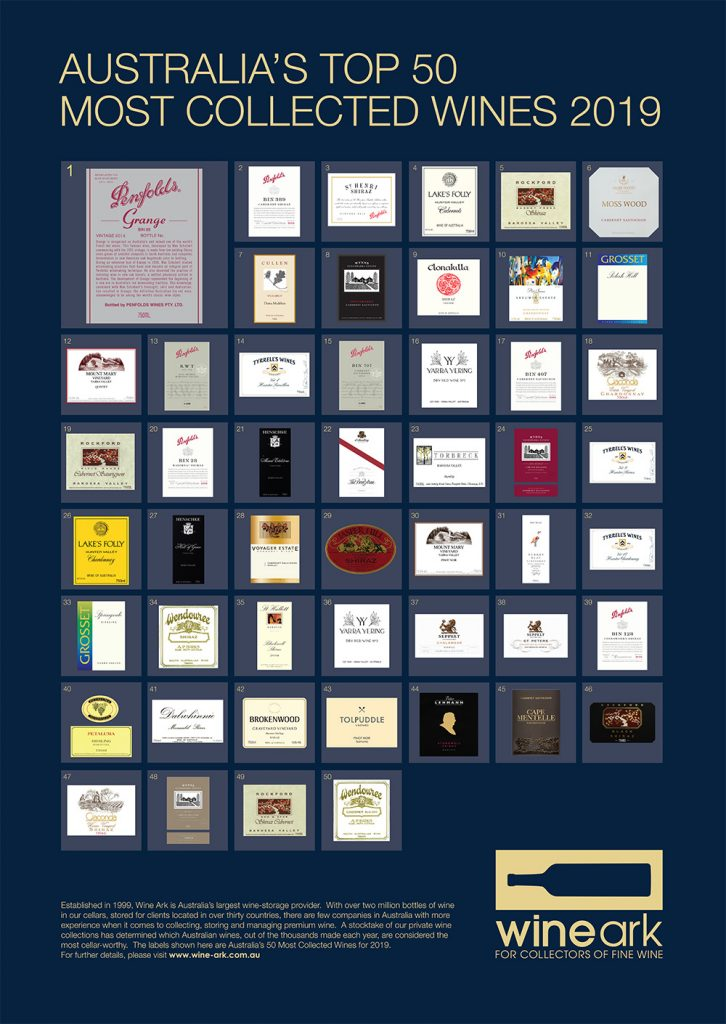

Wine Ark is an Australian wine storage provider. Established in 1999, Wine Ark stores over two million bottles of wine in 16 cellars across Australia, for clients in over 30 countries.

== History ==
Wine Ark was created in 1998 in Sydney by Dean Taylor, a former architect. Wine Ark was the first company worldwide to give its customers an access to their wine inventory online. Dean Taylor sold Wine Ark for $8.5 million in 2008.

In 2008, $20 million was invested to integrate Wine Ark storages units in National Storage storage centers. Wine Ark integrated a new service that catalogued, delivered and sold bottles for its customers.

== Description ==
Wine Ark is an Australian wine storage provider that stores over two million bottles of wine in 16 cellars across Australia.

Wine Ark's list of the 50 most collectable wines in Australia, released every three years since 2006, is a guide to cellaring trends in Australia. Every three years Wine Ark audits the cellars to provide a definitive list of the Australia Most Collected Wines.

== See also ==
- Storage of wine
- Australian wine
