= Wilkins Farago =

Australian publishing company

- Founded: 1998
- Country of origin: Australia
- Headquarters location: Albert Park, Victoria
- Publication types: Books
- Official website: www.wilkinsfarago.com.au

Wilkins Farago is an independent Australian book publishing house founded in Melbourne in 1998. Its founder is Andrew Wilkins. It is best known for publishing children's picture books translated from foreign languages into English. The company published at least 25 titles as of 2015.
