= Harvey D. Strassman =

Harvey D. Strassman (September 19, 1922 – January 30, 2011) was a psychiatrist, psychoanalyst, medical educator, and clinical researcher. He is the father of ventriloquist David Strassman.

Strassman, a veteran of World War II and the Korean War, is best known for his documentation of a syndrome that eventually became known as posttraumatic stress disorder, a result of insights gained from interviews with prisoners of war who had been held in North Korea. He described the condition in the paper "A Prisoner of War Syndrome: Apathy as a Reaction to Severe Stress", published with two colleagues in June 1956 in the American Journal of Psychiatry.

Strassman conducted the interviews over several months aboard a hospital ship. He concluded that the prisoners had not been "brainwashed", as some people had alleged. Rather, they withdrew as a defensive adjustment to the stress of being a prisoner of war. The withdrawal and suppressed emotional responses, he noted, could become so severe and complete that it could lead to a “maladaptive state of dependency in which he (the prisoner) ceases to take care of himself even to the point of death.” He labeled the syndrome “apathy” and distinguished it from a catatonic stupor, or depression.

He was a staff physician at the Veterans Administration (VA) Center in Los Angeles and an instructor in clinical psychiatry at the medical school of the University of California, Los Angeles when he published the paper.

== Early life ==
Strassman was born in Chicago on September 19, 1922, to Rose Goldman and Moe Strassman, a teacher, both of whom had come to the United States as young children of Russian Jewish immigrants. During the Great Depression, he sold shoes to help his family. Strassman graduated from Crane Technical High School in 1939.

He was admitted to medical school through an Army placement exam and graduated from the University of Illinois in 1948. He did his internship at Los Angeles County Hospital during the polio epidemic and his residency in psychiatry at the Veterans Administration hospital just west of the University of California, Los Angeles (UCLA) campus where he first taught. He lived in Los Angeles, became a psychoanalyst, and practiced in Beverly Hills, doing research on treatment for alcohol and substance abuse and on other topics such as humor and medical education. During his time in Los Angeles, he was a member of the Los Angeles Psychoanalytic Society and Institute (LAPSI).

== Psychiatry ==
Medical education became Strassman's passion. He quit private practice to move to Chicago in 1969 and began to teach psychiatry full-time. He was a professor of psychiatry at Chicago Medical School from 1972 until 1978, served as Acting Dean of the school in 1974 and then as Assistant Dean for Curriculum for three years. He also served as acting chief of psychiatry at the North Chicago VA Hospital from 1975 to 1978.

“Harvey was a mentor and a great giver of advice,” said Dr. Fred Sierles, a professor of psychiatry at the Chicago Medical School. In 1983, Strassman became a professor of psychiatry at the Robert Wood Johnson School of Medicine and Chief of Psychiatry at the Cooper Medical Center, now the Cooper University Hospital, in Camden, New Jersey, where he worked until he retired in 1993. He was a Distinguished Life Fellow of the American Psychiatric Association.

At times, when he would lecture on humor, Harvey Strassman would plan to have someone throw a pie in his face during the talk to elicit a wide range of reactions: from laughter, to embarrassment, to anger, he said. “He took great delight in that,” said his son, Neil. “He enjoyed forcing the immediate realization upon the audience that what some people might find funny, others might find disagreeable.”

== Personal life ==
Strassman was married three times. First to Paula Kassam, then to Marjorie Strassman, who died before him. After retiring in 1993 Strassman and his third wife, Judith Koock Strassman, moved to Sacramento, California. There, he resumed private practice. In 2004, Strassman and Judith moved from Sacramento to Austin, Texas after he had a stroke. Strassman had three sons, two deceased, and two daughters. His son David is known as a ventriloquist.

Strassman died aged 88 years on January 30, 2011 after being in poor health for some time.
