= List of 1998 box office number-one films in Australia =

This is a list of films which placed number-one at the weekend box office in Australia during 1998. Amounts are in Australian dollars.

(N.B.: Seemingly improper dates are due to holiday weekends or other occasions. N/A denotes information that is not available from Urban Cinefile nor Movie Marshal.)

== Number-one films ==
†	This implies the highest-grossing movie of the year.

#	Weekend end date	Film	Total weekend gross	Notes
1	4 January 1998	Titanic †	$3,606,297	
2	11 January 1998	Titanic †	$2,644,516	
3	18 January 1998	Spiceworld	N/A	
4	25 January 1998	Spiceworld	N/A	
5	1 February 1998	Spiceworld	N/A	
6	8 February 1998	Spiceworld	N/A	
7	15 February 1998	As Good as It Gets	N/A	
8	22 February 1998	As Good as It Gets	N/A	
9	1 March 1998	Titanic †	$1,633,523	
10	8 March 1998	Titanic †	$1,405,107	
11	15 March 1998	Good Will Hunting	N/A	Good Will Hunting grossed $3,059,537 in the week ending 18 March
12	22 March 1998	Good Will Hunting	N/A	
13	29 March 1998	Good Will Hunting	N/A	
14	5 April 1998	The Man in the Iron Mask	N/A	
15	12 April 1998	Lost in Space	N/A	
16	19 April 1998	The Wedding Singer	N/A	The Wedding Singer grossed $3,848,435 in the week ending 22 April
17	26 April 1998	The Wedding Singer	$2,236,825	
18	3 May 1998	The Wedding Singer	$1,654,777	
19	10 May 1998	The Wedding Singer	$1,150,964	
20	17 May 1998	The Wedding Singer	$1,131,921	
21	24 May 1998	City of Angels	$1,498,071	
22	31 May 1998	City of Angels	$1,055,056	
23	8 June 1998^{4-day weekend}	Godzilla	$3,724,843	Godzilla previews
24	14 June 1998	Godzilla	$2,471,151	
25	21 June 1998	Deep Impact	$4,085,820	
26	28 June 1998	Deep Impact	$2,365,287	
27	5 July 1998	Dr. Dolittle	$3,263,961	
28	12 July 1998	Dr. Dolittle	$2,857,971	
29	19 July 1998	Dr. Dolittle	$1,749,849	
30	26 July 1998	The X-Files	$2,852,783	
31	2 August 1998	Sliding Doors	$2,285,858	
32	9 August 1998	Sliding Doors	$1,736,252	
33	16 August 1998	Sliding Doors	$1,319,661	
34	23 August 1998	Armageddon	$3,506,829	
35	30 August 1998	Armageddon	$2,260,961	
36	6 September 1998	There's Something About Mary	$2,085,894	
37	13 September 1998	Lethal Weapon 4	$2,733,243	
38	20 September 1998	There's Something About Mary	$1,704,225	
39	27 September 1998	The Truman Show	$3,127,430	
40	4 October 1998	The Truman Show	$2,118,041	
41	11 October 1998	Blade	$1,813,179	
42	18 October 1998	A Perfect Murder	$1,318,547	
43	25 October 1998	A Perfect Murder	$954,936	
44	1 November 1998	Antz	$1,846,805	
45	8 November 1998	Antz	$1,506,289	
46	15 November 1998	Antz	$1,140,110	
47	22 November 1998	Saving Private Ryan	$4,280,656	
48	29 November 1998	Saving Private Ryan	$2,852,520	
49	6 December 1998	A Bug's Life	$1,859,016	
50	14 December 1998	A Bug's Life	$1,473,592	
51	20 December 1998	A Bug's Life	$1,275,563	
52	28 December 1998	You've Got Mail	$2,374,109	

== Highest-grossing films ==
Highest-grossing films of 1998 by calendar gross:

Rank	Title	Studio(s)	Gross (USD)
1.	Titanic	20th Century Fox	$30,700,000
2.	There's Something About Mary	20th Century Fox	$12,500,000
3.	As Good as It Gets	Columbia TriStar International	$12,100,000
4.	Saving Private Ryan	United International Pictures	$11,700,000
5.	The Wedding Singer	Roadshow Entertainment	$11,100,000
6.	Deep Impact	United International Pictures	$10,900,000
7.	Dr. Dolittle	20th Century Fox	$10,700,000
8.	Good Will Hunting	Miramax/Roadshow	$9,500,000
9.	Armageddon	Buena Vista International/Roadshow	$9,200,000
10.	Sliding Doors	United International Pictures	$8,900,000

== See also ==
- List of Australian films – Australian films by year
