= CARE Australia =

Australian humanitarian aid agency

CARE Australia is an Australian, not-for-profit, secular humanitarian aid agency assisting in disaster relief efforts and addressing the causes of global poverty in developing countries. It is one of a confederation of 12 national members of CARE International, forming one of the world’s largest international emergency aid and development assistance organisations. It was founded in 1987 by former Prime Minister Malcolm Fraser who led it until 2002.

CARE Australia’s projects are funded primarily through community donations, and has secured additional support from institutional partners such as the Australian government, European Union, and the World Health Organization. In 2008, 88% of CARE Australia’s total revenue went into overseas projects.

== History ==
Australia became a national member of CARE International in 1987, when it was founded by former Prime Minister Malcolm Fraser. Fraser was Chair 1987 to 2002 and also President of CARE International from 1990 to 1995. It grew through the 1990s, delivering disaster assistance and development programs to those in need. Fraser's daughter, Phoebe Fraser, became a CARE worker and together they were the faces of the organisation's fundraising.

== Aims ==
CARE's mission is to serve individuals and families in the poorest communities in the world. This is done by:

- strengthening capacity for self-help,
- providing economic opportunity,
- delivering relief in emergencies,
- influencing policy decisions,
- addressing discrimination.

== Emergency response ==
CARE has a team of emergency professionals to assist in immediate relief and long-term rehabilitation for communities that are impacted by man-made or natural disasters. They provide communities with support, shelter, food, sanitation, and health facilities in times of crisis, as well as working with those that are vulnerable to disasters to reduce their future impact.

CARE has provided emergency relief to those affected by emergencies such as Cyclone Nargis in Myanmar (Burma), post-election violence in Kenya, the 2013 Balochistan earthquakes, and the Boxing Day tsunami. It is involved in aid to devastated areas affected by 2015's Cyclone Pam.

== Development projects ==
CARE Australia’s focus is on the support of women and girls in developing countries to create long term sustainability in the fight against poverty. Their long-term projects cover community development including:

- Agriculture and food security – CARE helps families produce more food and increase their income while managing their natural resources and preserving the environment,
- Education – CARE promotes discussion between parents, teachers and other members of the community to overcome the barriers to education that can keep families in a cycle of poverty,
- Health – CARE helps communities enjoy better health, with a special focus on mothers and children, by improving their access to quality health services, nutrition, family planning, immunisation and HIV awareness and prevention,
- Economic development – CARE assists impoverished families by supporting money-making activities, especially those operated by women,
- Nutrition – CARE teaches practices that help prevent malnutrition, including demonstrating breast feeding, cultivating and preparing nutritious food, providing food as part of emergency relief efforts, and managing food-for-work projects to help communities improve infrastructure,
- Water, Sanitation, and Environmental Health – CARE helps communities build and maintain clean water systems and latrines and educates people about good hygiene practice to reduce the risk of illness.

== Countries of operation ==
At present; CARE has programs in over 20 countries.

- Afghanistan
- Bangladesh
- Cambodia
- Ethiopia
- India
- Indonesia
- Jordan
- Kenya
- Laos
- Malawi
- Mozambique
- Mexico
- Myanmar
- Pakistan
- Palestinian Territories
- Papua New Guinea
- South Africa
- Sri Lanka
- Timor-Leste
- Vanuatu
- Vietnam
- Yemen
