= Frank Watene =

Former NZ Maori international rugby league footballer

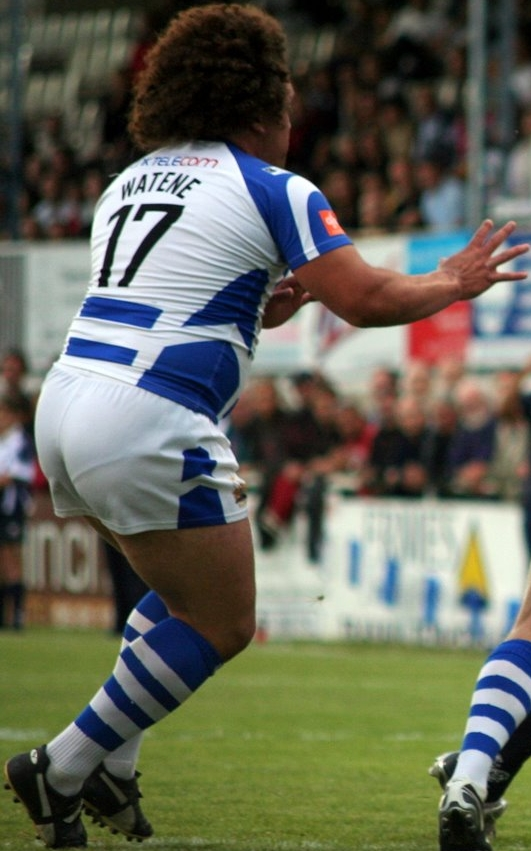

Personal information
- Full name: Francis Joseph Mihaka Watene
- Born: 15 February 1977 (age 49) New Zealand
- Height: 180 cm (5 ft 11 in)
- Weight: 114 kg (17 st 13 lb)

Playing information
- Position: Prop, Second-row
Club
Years	Team	Pld	T	G	FG	P
1996	Counties Manukau	20	4	0	0	16
1998	Auckland Warriors	1	0	0	0	0
1999–01	Wakefield Trinity Wildcats	66	6	0	0	24
2002–03	Dewsbury Rams	58	15	0	0	60
2004	Hull Kingston Rovers	30	4	0	0	16
2005	Castleford Tigers	24	5	0	0	20
2006	Dewsbury Rams	31	5	0	0	20
2007–11	Halifax	125	18	0	0	72
	Total	355	57	0	0	228
Representative
Years	Team	Pld	T	G	FG	P
1995	Tonga	1	0	0	0	0
1998–99	New Zealand Māori	2
- Relatives: Adam Watene (brother)

Francis Joseph Mihaka Watene (born 15 February 1977) is a former professional rugby league footballer who played as a prop or second-row forward in the 1990s, 2000s and 2010s. He played at representative level for Tonga (1995 Rugby League World Cup squad), New Zealand Junior Kiwis (1996), New Zealand Māori, and at club level for Counties Manukau Heroes, Auckland Warriors, Wakefield Trinity Wildcats, Hull Kingston Rovers, Castleford Tigers, Dewsbury Rams and Halifax at club level.

== Personal ==
Frank is the older brother of rugby league footballer, Adam Watene.

== Early years ==
Watene started his career with the Otahuhu Leopards in the Auckland Rugby League competition, before being signed by the new Auckland Warriors club in 1994. He made his first grade début in 1998. Watene toured with the New Zealand Māori rugby league team in 1998 and played for them in the 1997 Oceania Cup and against Great Britain in 1999.

== England ==
Watene last played for Halifax in the second division of English rugby league called the RFL Championship. Of Tongan and New Zealand Māori descent, 'Frank the Tank' signed for Halifax at the start of the 2007 rugby league season after playing for Dewsbury Rams in 2006 and helping them to win their National League two promotion. Watene was named in the dream team after an impressive year. Watene's usual position is Prop Forward however due to his sheer size Watene usually starts off the matches on the substitutes bench and will come onto the field of play later in the match, when his team need a boost of energy which he provides in the form of strong running. In September 2007 Frank signed a one-year extension to his current Halifax contract, after a highly impressive season.
