= Banjo Frogs =

- Directed by: Nick Hilligos
- Produced by: ABC Natural History Unit
- Music by: Niko Schäuble
- Distributed by: Bullfrog Films
- Release date: 1998
- Running time: 5 Minutes
- Country: Australia
- Language: English

Banjo Frogs is a 1998 Australian claymation film directed by Nick Hilligos.

== Synopsis ==
According to the New York Public Library catalogue's listing of the film:

"An unsuspecting, adolescent frog takes a trip to the garbage dump, where he tries unsensitively to ingratiate himself with the locals. But he just doesn't fit in until he picks up an old banjo and dramatically changes his tune."

== Production ==
According to Hilligoss, the concept for Banjo Frog came to him during a walk next to a creek near his Melbourne home when he noted the contrast between the beautiful green tree-frog's poor singing ability and the ugly banjo frog's better ability.

Hilligoss did most of the animation in Banjo Frogs by himself, except for a crowd scene in which he used an assistant.

== Accolades ==
- ALA Notable Children's Video
- Best Overall Program, 9-12 Youth Jury, ReaL to ReeL
- Bronze Plaque, Columbus International Film & Video Festival
- Certificate of Merit/Children's Jury, Chicago International Children's Film Festival
