= House From Hell =

- Genre: Reality television
- Created by: Andrew Denton
- Presented by: Amanda Keller
- Country of origin: Australia
- No. of seasons: 1
- No. of episodes: 7

Production
- Producers: Kaye Browne; Brian Pickering; Craig Meade; Rod Stephen
- Production locations: Sydney, New South Wales

Original release
- Network: Network 10
- Release: 8 October 1998

House From Hell was an Australian reality television series that screened on Network 10 in 1998.

House from Hell originated as a radio competition, which was part of the Triple M Sydney breakfast show hosted by Andrew Denton and Amanda Keller. It debuted on television on 8 October 1998. The contestants were placed in a house together for three months and involved in various stunts and ordeals. It was a precursor to Big Brother, and Denton has conceded in radio interviews that he regrets being involved in the program, due to the unacceptable level of human exploitation.

The successful contestants were personally chosen by Denton from 1,000 applicants and lived in a four-bedroom house in Naremburn on Sydney's lower North Shore. Denton recalled, "Everyone I know has been through some share accommodation and knows how horrible it can be to be in some horrible place with people you don't like, and there's that great saying that hell is other people." The six contestants were: 40-year-old, married father-of-three Colin Beggs, who described himself as a "yobbo", 26 year-old Kellie Henneberry who worked in advertising and sought to educate the public about her homosexuality, 31 year-old Sandra Emberton, who had had a career as an exotic dancer, Joselyn Barber, who at 21 was studying Arts at Sydney University, surfer Andrew Janiszewski, 22, and Lee Hunter, 28, who worked in painting and decorating.

For the first two weeks, the contestants were confined to the house. Their challenges included wearing boxing gloves for a weekend, spending another two full days tied to each other, and having meals that consisted solely of baked beans, prunes and ice cream. One weekend all their household furniture was switched with child-sized replacements while they were made to wear sumo wrestler suits. The prize money was $5,000.

The house was fitted with a webcam using RealVideo that streamed 24/7 to Network 10's website throughout the duration of the show, allowing viewers to watch the contestants in real time.
