= Hazards, Disasters and Survival =

Australian documentary series (1998)

Hazards, Disasters and Survival was an Australian documentary series broadcast by the ABC in 1998. Aimed at the education market, it was a six part series of 15 minute episodes. It looks at the implications of natural hazards and how to reduce the potential impact on your lives. An accompanying teachers resource was produced for the series.

== Episodes ==
1. Severe storms
2. Floods
3. Bushfires
4. Cyclones
5. Heatwaves
6. Earthquakes and landslides
