= Adam Wright (rugby league) =

Australian rugby league footballer

Personal information
- Full name: Adam Wright
- Born: 1975 Sydney, New South Wales, Australia
- Died: 17 July 1998 (aged 22–23) Five Dock, New South Wales, Australia

Playing information
- Position: Prop, Second-row
Club
Years	Team	Pld	T	G	FG	P
1995–96	South Sydney	5	0	0	0	0

Adam Wright (1975 – 17 July 1998) was an Australian professional rugby league footballer for the South Sydney Rabbitohs in the National Rugby League competition. His position of choice was as a prop.

== Background ==
He was born in Sydney, New South Wales, Australia to Robert (Bobby) and Barbara. He grew up in Haberfield in the inner west of Sydney.

Wright was shot and killed outside of the Five Dock Hotel on 17 July 1998. Organised crime figure Michael Kanaan was convicted of Wright's murder and sentenced to life imprisonment.
