= Glenn Fraser =

Australian film director

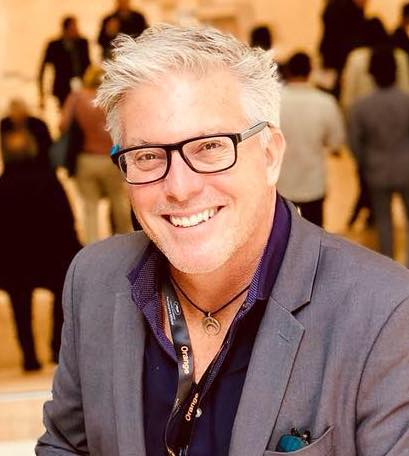
Glenn Fraser, Cannes Film Festival, 2018

Glenn Fraser is an Australian filmmaker.

== Life and career ==
He attended Woollahra Public School and then Sydney Boys High School, in Moore Park from 1980 to 1985.

His films have received awards and his work has been exhibited in major international film festivals including Tropfest, the Sydney Film Festival, Edinburgh International Film Festival and Sundance Film Festival.

In 2017, Fraser and the team at Transmedia Entertainment developed the world's first fully dramatised virtual reality comic book in Moriarty: Endgame VR. The work was debuted at Wondercon 2017.

In 2018, Fraser and fellow filmmaker Karl Jenner developed the Face Off Screen Actors' Showcase.

In 2023, Fraser directed and co-produced the award-winning short feature Mother Tongue by screenwriter Amelia Foxton, a comedic horror film that blends '70s horror tropes with LGBTQIA+ advocacy.

In 2022, Fraser was invited to produce and coordinate one of Australia’s premier environmental and plant-based festivals, Alive Festival on the New South Wales Central Coast. Fraser took over from founder Ricky Simoes who had established the event in 2015. It has since received considerable government support for its driving of community- and environmentally conscious activities and Fraser was recognised by Central Coast Council as an active contributor to the arts in the local region.
