= The Forgotten Toys =

- Genre: Adventure; Comedy; Fantasy
- Created by: James Stevenson
- Directed by: Graham Ralph
- Voices of: Bob Hoskins; Joanna Lumley; Clement Freud; Andrew Sachs; Kate Sachs
- Country of origin: United Kingdom
- Original language: English
- No. of seasons: 2
- No. of episodes: 26

Production
- Producer: Karen Davidsen
- Running time: 11 minutes
- Production companies: Link Entertainment for ITV Meridian; United Productions

Original release
- Network: ITV (CITV)
- Release: 26 December 1995 – 23 December 1999

The Forgotten Toys is a 1997–99 British animated comedy television series based on James Stevenson's children's book The Night After Christmas. It was made by Hibbert Ralph Entertainment, featuring the voices of Joanna Lumley and Bob Hoskins. It is a poignant and emotional tale of abandoned toys who are searching for children to love them. It aired on CITV in the UK and on ABC in Australia.

The series is available to watch on BritBox and Prime Video.

== Characters ==
- Teddy (voiced by Bob Hoskins) is a bad-tempered scruffy bear. Sometimes he moans about everything and whenever he passes or sees green vegetables, he exclaims in disgust: "Sprouts! I hate sprouts!". In the episode called "Baby", he is forced to eat Brussels sprouts, but he spits them out in disgust. He also usually gets into trouble.
- Annie (voiced by Joanna Lumley; Shelley Thompson (American redub)) is a feisty, kind, wise, honourable, jolly, and take-charge rag doll. When she is in charge of Teddy, she usually tries to keep him out of trouble. She is often interested in and curious about several things, and is willing to help those on need. Teddy often calls her "Pigtails".
- Chauncey (voiced by Clement Freud; Bob Sessions (American redub)) is an old, gray stray dog. He only appears in "The Night After Christmas" and becomes a good friend who gives Teddy and Annie a place to stay.
- Keef (voiced by Andrew Sachs) is a thin and tall male burglar of the two. He wears a blue jacket, a flat cap, thin trousers and a red waistcoat. He gets very stern with his wife Kath, and sometimes he gets very moody and bored. Keef is one of the main antagonists of the show.
- Kath (voiced by Kate Sachs) is the fat female burglar. She wears a green coat, a yellow beanie, a yellow scarf and pink fingerless gloves. She gets very scared, anxious and nervous about anything to do with her husband Keef. Kath is one the main antagonists of the show.

== Episodes ==
No.	Title	Original release date
1	"Forgotten Again"	TBA
Annie and Teddy get left behind by their new children on holiday and need to find their own way back home.
2	"Toys That Go Bump in the Night"	TBA
Annie and Teddy take shelter in a church and befriend an owl who lives there, but the burglars Keef and Kath break in to steal two candlesticks.
3	"Not Fair"	TBA
At a fair, Annie and Teddy try to keep a puppy out of trouble and bring him back to his owners.
4	"New Zoo"	TBA
Annie and Teddy help the animals of a zoo run by a mean keeper.
5	"Toy Boy"	TBA
Annie becomes infatuated with action figure doll Captain Courage.
6	"Toy Stars"	TBA
In a puppet theatre, Annie becomes a star for the show, but the puppet master Dolby has other ideas.
7	"Cowboy Toys"	TBA
Teddy tells the story of his Wild West ancestor Little Big Teddy.
8	"Toys on Trial"	TBA
Annie and Teddy get caught in the middle of a jewelry robbery. With help from the bloodhound Skip, Annie reveals the burglars Kath and Keef to the police.
9	"Hospital Toys"	TBA
Annie and Teddy go to hospital where they try to help a sick girl and get Teddy's arm mended.
10	"Chicken"	TBA
In a henhouse, Teddy hatches a chick who thinks he is his mother.
11	"Dolled Up"	TBA
Annie is taken in the house of a girl who likes dolls for fashion and rejects the misfits.
12	"On The Road"	TBA
Teddy and Annie are used as mascots by a truck driver. They then befriend an angry dog named Spud who is mistreated by his owner.
13	"Blazing Toys"	TBA
Annie and Teddy rescue a little boy's teddy bear from a burning building.
14	"Toy Boy 2 - The Return of Captain Courage"	TBA
Annie meets Captain Courage again and Teddy challenges him.
15	"Spy Toys"	TBA
Teddy reveals he was once a secret agent.
16	"A Fridge Too Far"	TBA
When Annie and Teddy go inside two neighbouring houses, they find themselves caught in a war between the toys.
17	"Close Encounters of the Toy Kind"	TBA
Teddy and Annie meet a toy Martian. Annie tries to get it back to its owner, while Teddy tries to send it back to Mars.
18	"Magic Teddy/Magic Toys"	TBA
Teddy finds a magic wand, but eventually the theatre magician wants it back. Annie summons help before the magic gets out of hand.
19	"Toy Swap"	TBA
Teddy swaps places with a posh teddy bear, but they eventually find their new places don't suit them.
20	"Teddy in Love/Toys in Love"	TBA
Teddy develops a crush on a ballerina toy, but fails to try and woo her. Teddy and Annie have to save her from Keef and Kath.
21	"Castaway Toys"	TBA
Annie and Teddy get stranded on an island. They meet a doll named Friday, thwart Keef and Kath's egg poaching and find a way back to the mainland.
22	"Circus Toys"	TBA
After watching a circus show, Annie gets taken by an escaped gorilla. Teddy helped by the mouse Mr. Big rescue her and the gorilla.
23	"Baby"	TBA
Teddy is taken for a baby toy. After Teddy has to stay with the baby, Annie finally finds the baby's lost teddy Humphrey.
24	"Bath Toys"	TBA
After getting dirty, Teddy and Annie go and get washed in a house that is marked for demolition. They rescue the bath toys and find them a new owner.
25	"Dog Day"	TBA
At the dockyard, Annie and Teddy befriend a lonesome dog and try to train him to be suited for a new owner.
26	"Trouble in Store"	TBA
Annie and Teddy explore a shopping centre to get a ribbon for Annie's hair. Annie then has to save Teddy from a Sprouts advertisement.

== History ==
The Forgotten Toys was first shown on 26 December 1995, and was later repeated on Living's Tiny Living block. Numerous videos were released in or around 1995 and 1996 and a couple of DVDs followed in 2000-2002. The Forgotten Toys has now been long considered dissolved, though 'the end' of the series was never officially announced. The Christmas special aired on the Fox Family Channel in the United States in 1998 where Annie and Chauncey's voices were redubbed.

== See also ==
- List of Christmas films
