= David Strassman =

American entertainer

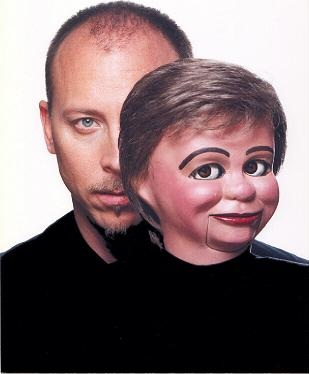
- Strassman with Chuck Wood
- Born: September 6, 1957 (age 69); Los Angeles County, California, U.S.
- Spouse: Lisa McLaughlin (ex)

Comedy career
- Years active: 1980–present
- Medium: Stand-up
- Genre: Ventriloquism
- Website: www.DavidStrassman.com

David Strassman (born September 6, 1957) is an American ventriloquist, stand-up comedian, actor, and voice artist. He is best known for his ventriloquism act with Chuck Wood and Ted E. Bare.

== Early life and education ==
Strassman, the second of four children, was born and raised in Los Angeles County, California. His father, Harvey D. Strassman (September 19, 1922 – January 30, 2011), was a psychiatrist and medical academic of Jewish descent.

== Career ==
A visit to Disneyland with his family prompted a young Strassman to ask his father to purchase some professional magic tricks that he performed for local neighborhood children. Strassman took a ventriloquism class in junior high school as an elective, taught by local Chicago children's television host Steve Hart. Strassman discovered he was good at it and could make money from his performances.

Strassman studied acting at the American Academy of Dramatic Arts in New York but returned to ventriloquism. He took to busking in Central Park in New York, Leicester Square and the Marble Arch in London and a brief stint in Paris.

Strassman performed in New York's comedy clubs including An Evening at the Improv. In 1980, Strassman (along with his main ventriloquist character Chuck Wood) appeared in Roger Corman's horror movie Humanoids from the Deep.

In 1986, Strassman added remote controls to his puppet, Chuck Wood, using transmitters, motors, and servos derived from his hobby of flying remote control model airplanes. He discovered a remote clutch system in a NASA facility that could be integrated into his dummies. At the end of Strassman's act he gets into an argument with his dummy, Chuck Wood, and leaves the stage. Chuck then appears to come to life with Strassman speaking into an off-stage microphone. He debuted this routine on The Late Show with Arsenio Hall in 1989. New York ventriloquist Stanley Burns used remote-controlled dummies in the 1950s.

In 1995, he performed on The Jerry Lewis MDA Labor Day Telethon.

In 1996, he performed at the Edinburgh Fringe Festival in Scotland. He received the “Critics Award for Comedy” and the Glasgow “Herald Angel award.” Strassman continues to perform frequently throughout Australia, New Zealand, and Britain.

Strassman had a television talk show called "Strassman" on Nine Australia, where his puppet character, Chuck Wood, interviewed celebrities. Subsequent series were produced in England on ITV, and in New Zealand on TV2.

Strassman has 6 DVD titles. Strassman Live (1999) – Volume 1, The Chuck You Tour (2003) - Volume 2, Get Chuck'd Tour (2007) – Volume 3, Ted E's Farewell (2010) – Volume 4, Careful What You Wish For (2014) – Volume 5, and iTedE (2018) – Volume 6.

In 2010, he performed the play, "Duality," written and directed by Steve Altman, at the Edinburgh Fringe Festival and in Los Angeles, CA. Duality is a two-character play about a mentally-ill ventriloquist, Jack, who talks to himself through a puppet named Zack. Throughout Duality, Strassman's character "talks" to his ventriloquist puppet as it sits lifeless in a chair, he operates it manually with his hand in the back, and controls the puppet through wireless robotics.

Strassman regularly visits children's hospitals with his characters while on tour, including hospitals in Wellington and Melbourne.

Strassman's show, Careful What you Wish For ran in Australia through April 2014.

== Characters ==
Puppet characters voiced by Strassman include:

- Chuck Wood - A 1950s era-looking wooden ventriloquist puppet whose character cracks crude jokes, makes fun of other characters, spits and vomits. The puppet can also be remotely controlled. For the latter half of Careful What You Wish For, an alternate universe version of the character is presented as Charlie and sports a shaved, tattooed head and goatee, a look which carried over to Chuck in the sixth special, iTedE.
- Ted E. Bare - A soft Teddy bear hand puppet whose character is naïve, inquisitive, slow, innocent and is often the butt of Chuck's jokes and pranks. For the latter half of Careful What You Wish For, an alternate universe version of the character is presented as Theodore Bare, who smokes cigars and headbutts Strassman several times.
- Sid Beaverman - A North American beaver whose character is an aspiring stand-up hack comic. For the latter half of Careful What You Wish For, an alternate universe version of the character is presented as Sidney Australia Wellington, a koala.
- Kevin - An Alien puppet made of foam latex and controlled manually by Strassman. Similar in appearance to Crazy Frog
- Grandpa Fred - Ted E. Bare's grandfather who has dementia. During the latter half of Careful What You Wish For, an alternate universe version of the character is presented as Grandpa Frieda, an old transgender bear.
- A.N.G.E.L - Strassman's first female puppet, A.N.G.E.L is a robot android. A special mechanism is required to make Strassman's voice sound female.
- Buttons the Clown - A manually operated clown puppet who appears drunk.
- Little Ricky - A baby puppet that acts extremely nice to Strassman. In earlier performances, Little Ricky was portrayed as Strassman's nephew.
- The Dinosaurs - Strassman's robotic dinosaur puppets who sing pre-recorded songs.
- Vinny - Based on the story of the avaricious king Midas. He had no shortage of gold, yet despite his wealth, he desired even more gold.

Strassman's non-puppet characters include:

- The Crows - Strassman's robotic puppets who are aspiring musicians and when commanded to begin can't stop sneezing or belching. They have also been substituted by a trio of dinosaurs who actually sing.
- Mr. Invisible - An auditioner for Teddy's replacement. Strassman requires his stage hand to put on what would be assumed as a complex puppet. In fact, the segment was made up entirely of Strassman talking to his hand (Chuck: Strassman's finally lost it, Strassman's finally lost it). Strassman accidentally frustrates him by asking, "Do you have any special talents?" This prompted him to say, "...I'm invisible."
- Guido the Teddy Impersonator - A sleazy character who looks almost exactly the same as Teddy, but with a misshapen head. He was apparently put in jail for impersonating Teddy (and other crimes, such as drugs and prostitution). He also attempted to replace Teddy when he tried to leave the show.
- Charley - Though not actually a puppet, Charley is the commercially available programmable robot, Robonova, from Hitec. Strassman brought out Charley, a small toy puppet, just for kicks while the auditions were taking place. At first Strassman pretends to shoot Charley and he reacts in the expected way and other such cheap tricks. Chuck then instructed him to do several difficult tasks (stand on one leg and act like a chicken, do a cartwheel, do a handstand), which he accomplished with ease. Chuck, as it turns out, hacked Strassman's computer to made Charley do that. His final instruction: Kill the Audience. Strassman scoffs at the idea when he is forced to get rid of the approaching robot.
- Mumbles - Another potential replacement for Teddy. Strassman was quite happy to give him a shot, but realized that he forgot to make him a mouth and had to fail him.

== Filmography ==
=== Films ===
Year	Film	Role	Director	Notes
1980	Humanoids from the Deep	Billy	Barbara Peeters	
2001	Strassman Live!	Self (performer)	Denis Spencer	Direct-to-video release
2003	David Strassman: The Chuck You Tour	Self (performer)	David Strassman	Direct-to-video release
2011	Strassman: Ted-E's Farewell	Self (performer)	Jim Hare	Direct-to-video release
2014	Strassman: Careful What You Wish For	Self (performer)	Jim Hare	Direct-to-video release
2018	David Strassman: iTedE	Self (performer)	David Strassman	Direct-to-video release

=== Television ===
Year(s)	Title	Role(s)	Notes
1987	Paul Rodriguez Live!: I Need the Couch		Television special
1987	New Vaudevillians Too	Self	TV movie
1987	American Bandstand	Self	S31E6
1987	Just for Laughs	Self	S2E2
1988	Wednesday at Eight	Self	S1E3
1988–1992	An Evening at The Improv	Self (performer)	5 episodes
1989	Camp Midnite	Self (guest)	S1E5
1990	Doctor Doctor	Happy Hobart	S3E1 "Ch-Ch-Ch-Changes"
1990	Carol & Company	Self	S2E3 "Goin' to the Chapel"
1991	The Sunday Comics	Self (performer)	S1E7
1991	The New Lassie	Howard	S2E13 "Nikki's Family"
1991	What Would You Do?	Self	3 episodes
1992	Melbourne International Comedy Festival: The Gala 1992	Self (performer)	Television special
1992–1997	Hey Hey It's Saturday	Self (performer)	7 episodes
1995	The Jerry Lewis MDA Labor Day Telethon	Self (performer)	
1996	Night Stand with Dick Dietrick	Jimmy Mullican	S2E2 "Who's Killing at the Tickle Bin?"
1996	The Royal Variety Performance	Self (performer)	
1997	Des O'Connor Tonight	Self	S20E28
1997	Electric Circus	Self	Episode dated March 24, 1997
1998	The Jack Docherty Show	Self	Episode dated April 29, 1998
1998	Fully Booked	Self	S4E3
1998–1999	Strassman	Self (host)	3 episodes
1999	McCoist and MacAulay	Self	S3E3
2000	The Big Stage	Self	S1E7
2000	Tonight at the London Palladium	Self	S1E5
2000	Russell Gilbert Live	Self	S1E7
2001	The Panel	Self	S4E13
2004	The Late Late Show	Self	Episode dated April 16, 2004
2009	Hey Hey It's Saturday: The Reunion	Self (performer)	Television special
2020	Chuck and Ted-E's Outback Adventure	Self	Television special

== Australia and New Zealand radio appearances ==
- ABC Radio with Ben Elton
- 3AW Radio
- 4BC
- More FM

MIX 106.3 FM Canberra
