= Ketchup: Cats Who Cook =

Japanese-Australian animated television series

- VHS cover art for Ketchup: Cats Who Cook
- Voices of: Noeline Brown; Kearon de Clouet; Kate Fitzpatrick; Adam Kronenberg; Tony Poli; Justin Rosniak; Doug Scroope
- Countries of origin: Australia; Japan
- No. of episodes: 65

Production
- Running time: 5 minutes
- Production companies: NHK; Southern Star; Think Tank Productions

Original release
- Network: NHK Educational TV (Japan); Nine Network and Network 10 (Australia)
- Release: 5 October 1998 – 19 March 1999

Ketchup: Cats Who Cook (ケチャップ, Kechappu) is an Australian-Chinese-Japanese animated series broadcast between October 5, 1998, and April 2, 1999, on NHK in Japan. It was a co-production primarily with Southern Star of Australia, and secondarily with NHK (Japan Broadcasting Corporation), Think Tank Productions, and Shanghai Yilimie Animation Co. of China.

== Main characters ==
=== Japanese version ===
- Kappei Yamaguchi – Pickles – Chef Goulash's Assistant
- Kōsuke Komori – Scampi/Pesto – The Waiter
- Mami Koyama – Madame Courgette – The Owner of Cafe Courgette
- Kōsei Tomita – Chef Goulash – The Chef
- Taeko Shinbashi – Mrs. Borscht
- Mayu Fujimori – Spagette

=== English version ===
- Kate Fitzpatrick as Madame Courgette
- Doug Scroope as Chef Goulash
