= List of programming changes on Australian television in 2008 =

This is a list of programming changes which occurred on Australian television in 2008. The list is arranged chronological order. Where more than one programming changed was made on the same date, those changes are listed alphabetically.

== Changes to network affiliation ==
This is a list of programs which made their premiere on an Australian television network that had previously premiered on another Australian television network. The networks involved in the switch of allegiances are predominantly both free-to-air networks or both subscription television networks. Programs that have their free-to-air/subscription television premiere, after previously premiering on the opposite platform (free-to air to subscription/subscription to free-to air) are not included. In some cases, programs may still air on the original television network. This occurs predominantly with programs shared between subscription television networks.

=== Domestic ===
Program	New network	Previous network	Date
The Back Page	Fox Sports News	Fox Sports	5 February 2008
Vasili's Garden	Channel 31 Melbourne	SBS TV	6 February 2008
CyberShack	Nine Network	Network Ten	February 2008
Confidential TV	Arena	FOX8	5 May 2008
Salam Cafe	Channel 31	SBS TV	7 May 2008
Mortified	ABC1	Nine Network	3 July 2008

=== International ===
Program	New network	Previous network(s)	Date
(New Zealand) Sensing Murder	Nine Network	Network Ten	29 January 2008
(United States) Adult Swim	The Comedy Channel	Cartoon Network	11 March 2008
(United States) The L Word	Movie Extra	Seven Network	30 March 2008
(United Kingdom) Wild at Heart (Note: Season 1 of Wild at Heart was shown Sunday evening at 6:30 pm on Network Ten between 3 December 2006 and 21 January 2007. The season was then repeated on ABC1 on Saturday evenings at 7:30 pm between 21 June 2008 and 26 July 2008. Season 2 then premiered on ABC1 on 2 August 2008.)	ABC1	Network Ten	21 June 2008
(United Kingdom) Hotel Babylon	UK.TV	Nine Network	2 July
(United States) Three Sheets	Discovery Travel and Living	Unknown	2 September 2008
(United States) One Tree Hill	Arena	FOX8	20 October 2008
(United Kingdom) Jam & Jerusalem(From series 2)	UKTV	ABC TV	20 October 2008
(United States) Will & Grace	Network Ten	Seven Network	27 October 2008
(United States) Friends	111 Hits	Arena	1 November 2008
(United States) Lost	111 Hits	FOX8	1 November 2008
(United States) Walker, Texas Ranger	111 Hits	FOX8 and FOX Classics	1 November 2008
(United States) Will & Grace	111 Hits	Arena	1 November 2008
(United States) Baywatch	111 Hits	FOX8	2 November 2008
(United States) Dharma & Greg	111 Hits	FOX8	2 November 2008
(United States) The Drew Carey Show	111 Hits	FOX Classics	2 November 2008
(United States) The King of Queens	111 Hits	FOX8 and FOX Classics	2 November 2008
(United States) NYPD Blue	111 Hits	FOX8 and FOX Classics	2 November 2008
(United States) Malcolm in the Middle	111 Hits	FOX8	2 November 2008
(United States) That '70s Show	111 Hits	FOX8	2 November 2008
(United States) 3rd Rock from the Sun	111 Hits	FOX Classics	3 November 2008
(United States) ALF	111 Hits	The Comedy Channel	3 November 2008
(United States) Ally McBeal	111 Hits	FOX8	3 November 2008
(United States) ER	111 Hits	W. Channel	3 November 2008
(United States) Home Improvement	111 Hits	FOX Classics	3 November 2008
(United States) Murphy Brown	111 Hits	FOX Classics	3 November 2008
(United States) Northern Exposure	111 Hits	FOX8	3 November 2008
(United States) Suddenly Susan	111 Hits	Unknown	3 November 2008
(United States) Veronica's Closet	111 Hits	Arena	3 November 2008
(United States) Without a Trace	111 Hits	Arena	3 November 2008
(United States) The Wonder Years	111 Hits	TV1	3 November 2008
(United States) The Daily Show Global Edition	Network Ten	SBS TV	9 November 2008

== Free-to-air premieres ==
This is a list of programs which made their premiere on Australian free-to-air television that had previously premiered on Australian subscription television. Programs may still air on the original subscription television network.

=== Domestic ===
Program	Free-to-air network	Subscription network	Date
Stupid, Stupid Man	ABC1	TV1	20 February 2008

=== International ===
Date	Program	FTA	Pay TV
1 April	(United Kingdom) Ladette to Lady (Season 2)	The LifeStyle Channel	Nine Network
22 April	(United Kingdom) Balls of Steel	Nine Network	The Comedy Channel
2 May	(United Kingdom) I'm a Celebrity Get Me Out of Here (2006)	Network Ten	UK.TV
8 May	(United Kingdom) Trinny & Susannah Undress the Nation	Seven Network	The LifeStyle Channel
23 June	(United Kingdom) Bear: Spy in the Woods	Nine Network	Animal Planet
1 July	(United Kingdom) Bad Lads Army (Season 2) (Axed after one episode)	Nine Network	UK.TV
6 July	(United States) Dexter	Network Ten	Showcase
7 July	(United Kingdom) The F-Word (Season 2)	Nine Network	The LifeStyle Channel
18 July	(United Kingdom) The Graham Norton Show (Season 3)	ABC2	The Comedy Channel
12 August	(United States) Dog the Bounty Hunter	Nine Network	FOX8
8 September	(United States) The View	Nine Network	W. Channel
8 September	(United States) The Ellen DeGeneres Show	Nine Network	Arena
27 August 2008	(United Kingdom) The Apprentice	Seven Network	UK.TV
4 October	(United States) Hannah Montana & Miley Cyrus: Best of Both Worlds Concert	Seven Network	Disney Channel
13 October	(United Kingdom) Louis and the Nazis	Seven Network	?
27 November	(United States) Life After People	Seven Network	The History Channel
29 November	(United States) Camp Rock	Seven Network	Disney Channel
3 December	(United States) Gossip Girl (axed after 3 episodes)	Nine Network	FOX8
3 December	(United Kingdom) Victoria's Empire	ABC2	UK.TV
6 December	(United States) The Hills	Nine Network	MTV
Still to debut	(United States) K-Ville	Network Ten	FOX8
Still to debut	(United Kingdom) The Long Firm	ABC1	Showtime
Still to debut	(United States) Unhitched	Network Ten	Still to be announced
Still to debut	(United States) Surgery Saved My Life	Seven Network	Discovery Channel Australia

== Subscription television premieres ==
This is a list programs which had their premiere on Australian subscription television that had previously premiered on free-to-air television. Programs may still air on the original free-to-air network.

=== Domestic ===
Program	Subscription network	Free-to-air network	Date
Carbon Cops	The LifeStyle Channel	ABC TV	3 January
Mortified	Disney Channel	Nine Network	5 January 2008
Ifish with Tackleworld	The LifeStyle Channel		12 April 2008
Bondi Rescue	Nat Geo Adventure	Network Ten	4 September 2008
The Kingdom of Paramithi	Nick Jr.	Nine Network	December 2008
Surf Patrol	The LifeStyle Channel		18 July 2008
Australia's Best Backyards	The LifeStyle Channel	Seven Network	18 October

=== International ===
Program	Subscription network	Free-to-air network	Date
(United Kingdom) That Mitchell and Webb Look	UKTV	ABC1	18 February 2008
(United Kingdom) North and South	UKTV	ABC TV	20 March
(United Kingdom) Afterlife	UKTV	Nine Network	29 March
(United Kingdom) The Complete Guide to Parenting	UKTV	ABC TV	31 March
(United Kingdom) Star Stories	UKTV	ABC TV	7 April
(United Kingdom) Bleak House	UKTV	ABC TV	8 May
(United Kingdom) Hyperdrive	UKTV	ABC TV	26 May
(United Kingdom) The IT Crowd	UKTV	ABC TV	16 June
(United States) The Office	TV1	Network Ten	4 September 2008
(United Kingdom) Jam & Jerusalem	UKTV	ABC TV	8 September 2008
(United Kingdom) Never Did Me Any Harm	The LifeStyle Channel		8 September
(United Kingdom) The Madness of Modern Families	The LifeStyle Channel	ABC TV	11 September
(United States) How to Look Good Naked	The LifeStyle Channel	Network Ten	21 September
(United Kingdom) Primeval	UKTV	Nine Network	7 October 2008
(United Kingdom) It's Me or the Dog	The LifeStyle Channel		8 November
(United Kingdom) Paradise or Bust	The LifeStyle Channel		17 November
(United Kingdom) Robin Hood	UKTV / BBC HD	ABC TV	18 November 2008

== Returning this year ==
Program	Network	Debut date	Return date
Good News Week	Network Ten	19 April 1996	11 February 2008
This Is Your Life	Nine Network	1995	9 March 2008
Wide World of Sports	Nine Network	23 May 1981	16 March 2008
Gladiators	Seven Network	1995	30 March 2008
Double the Fist	ABC1	2004	14 August 2008

== Ending this year ==
Program	New network	Debut date	End date
It Takes Two: Getting Ready (Note: It Takes Two: Getting Ready was axed after one episode.)	Seven Network	19 February 2008	19 February 2008
The NightCap (Note: The NightCap was axed after five weeks.)	Seven HD	12 February 2008	13 March 2008
The Mint	Nine Network	31 July 2007	30 March 2008
Power of 10 (Note: Power of 10 was axed after two episodes.)	Nine Network	31 March 2008	7 April 2008
My Kid's a Star (Note: My Kid's a Star was axed after six episodes.)	Nine Network	7 April 2008	31 May 2008
Million Dollar Wheel of Fortune	Nine Network	26 May 2008	31 May 2008
Big Brother Australia	Network Ten	23 April 2001	21 July 2008
Nightline	Nine Network	1992	25 July 2008
Sunday	Nine Network	15 November 1981	3 August 2008
Taken Out (Note: Taken Out was axed after 19 episodes.)	Network Ten	1 September 2008	25 September 2008
The Outdoor Room	Seven Network	31 August 2008	30 November 2008
ttn	Network Ten	3 February 2004	2 December 2008
The Strip	Nine Network	4 September 2008	4 December 2008
Enough Rope	ABC1	17 March 2003	8 December 2008
