= The Comedy Channel (disambiguation) =

The Comedy Channel was an Australian television channel from 1996 to 2020.

The Comedy Channel may also refer to:

- The Comedy Channel (American TV channel), 1989–1991; merged with HA! to become Comedy Central
- The Comedy Channel (British TV channel), 1991–1992

== See also ==
- CTV Comedy Channel, a Canadian television channel
- Comedy (Australian TV channel), the successor to the Australian Comedy Channel and Fox Hits
