= Fox Hits =

Australian television channel

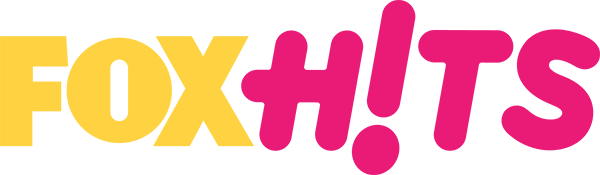
- Country: Australia
- Broadcast area: Australia

Programming
- Language(s): English
- Picture format: 576i (16:9 SDTV)

Ownership
- Owner: Foxtel Networks
- Sister channels: Foxtel Networks channels

History
- Launched: 7 November 2019
- Closed: 1 September 2020
- Replaced by: Fox Comedy

Availability

Streaming media
- Foxtel Go: Channel 114

Fox Hits was an Australian television channel focused on airing comedy shows. It was launched by Foxtel Networks on 7 November 2019, along with Fox One, Crime and Funny. On 1 September 2020, Foxtel announced that it would shutdown, along with The Comedy Channel, to create Fox Comedy, which is not to be confused with the Fox Comedy owned by Disney.
