= Jeremy Kewley =

Australian actor (born 1960)

- Born: Jeremy Leo Kewley; 16 August 1960 (age 66); Melbourne, Victoria, Australia
- Occupations: Actor, writer, producer
- Years active: 1976–2014
- Television: Vic Manoulis in Janus; Bryan Gray in Stingers
- Status: Released
- Convictions: 26 November 2015 (guilty plea)
- Criminal charges: Child sex offences, Child sexual abuse

Jeremy Leo Kewley (born 16 August 1960) is an Australian convicted child sex offender, former actor, writer, and producer. He made his professional acting debut as an adolescent in the feature film The Devil's Playground (1976).

== Early life ==
Kewley was born 16 August 1960 in Melbourne, Australia. While still at school, Kewley was discovered by Fred Schepisi and cast in The Devil's Playground. He then went on to appear in films such as Mad Dog Morgan, opposite Dennis Hopper and Jack Thompson, and the Bruce Beresford film The Getting of Wisdom, as well as television series including Bellbird, The Sullivans and Twenty Good Years. Kewley moved to Sydney in 1979 after he was cast in Arcade as Robbie Stewart.

== Career ==
=== Television ===
Kewley appeared in numerous Australian television series including The Henderson Kids II, Prisoner, The Young Doctors, Thunderstone, Cop Shop, The Man From Snowy River, SeaChange, The Secret Life Of Us and Neighbours where he played Dr Adrian Ewart during 1995.

From 1994 to 1995, he appeared in the critically acclaimed ABC-TV drama series Janus (1995 Logie Award Winner for Best Drama Series and Best Actor) where he played the lead role of Crown Prosecutor Vic Manoulis.

In 1997, he began playing the recurring role of local Mount Thomas journalist Tony Timms in Blue Heelers until the series ended in 2006.

And from 2000 to 2004, he played Detective Senior Sergeant Bryan Gray in the Nine Network's undercover police series Stingers (Best Drama Series – 2004 AFI Awards).

In 2007, he appeared as Frank Parry QC opposite Jack Thompson and Colin Friels in the ABC-TV mini-series Bastard Boys, and began playing the recurring role of Adam Gardiner in the Nine Network's outback drama McLeod's Daughters.

In 2009/2010, he guest starred in popular Australian series like Bed of Roses and City Homicide.

In June 2010, he was cast in the first movie spin-off of Australian series Underbelly, Underbelly Files: Tell Them Lucifer was Here, which tells the story of two murdered police officers. Kewley played one of the lead roles in the Screentime movie which premiered on Australia's Nine Network in February 2011. In 2013 he was cast as notorious Melbourne underworld figure Des 'Tuppence' Moran in the nine-part series Fat Tony & Co. which premiered on the Nine Network in Australia on Sunday 23 February 2014.

=== Movies ===
He has starred in motion pictures including Amy (1998) opposite Rachel Griffiths, Disappearance (2002) a mystery thriller set in Nevada, in which he starred opposite Harry Hamlin and Susan Dey, and The X Team (2003) a snow-bound action adventure shot in the New Zealand Alps for Touchstone Pictures and Mandalay Pictures.

He plays the lead role of US film producer Jerry Goldman in Frank & Jerry (2012); plays Professor Weston-Smith Gurrie in 10 Terrorists (2012) directed by Dee McLachlan; and stars as Roy Rogers in The Legend Maker (2014) directed by Ian Pringle.

=== Comedy ===
For the Seven Network, he appeared in the situation comedy series Bligh and Wedlocked; for ABC-TV he was a regular in The Gerry Connolly Show sketch comedy series; made a number of appearances on Backberner; played one of the leads in the 1996 sit-com pilot Darling! and guest starred in episodes of The Adventures of Lano and Woodley, Pig's Breakfast, and the 2006 Hamish and Andy mock-current affairs series Real Stories.

In 2008, he appeared on Rove Live, and had recurring roles on the ABC-TV sit-com Very Small Business and the Australian version of the Disney Channel's As The Bell Rings.

In 2009, he starred in the eight-part comedy series Whatever Happened To That Guy? for The Comedy Channel on Foxtel and played the role of television network CEO Charles Kane in the pilot of the Foxtel comedy series I Can't Believe It's Not Better.

=== Audience warm-ups ===
One of only a handful of television audience warm-up comedians working in Australia, Kewley has worked on dozens of classic Australian television shows from Young Talent Time and Candid Camera on Australia to Australia's Brainiest Kid, National Bingo Night and the Marngrook Footy Show.

He has been the warm-up comedian for the AFL version of The Footy Show since it began in 1994, and as well as the weekly studio-based shows produced out of GTV 9 in Melbourne, he has also been part of all The Footy Show broadcasts live from Perth, Hobart, Adelaide and Sydney; the annual "Grand Final" specials in front of 13,000 people at Melbourne's Rod Laver Arena; the high-rating shows broadcast live from the Theatre Royal, Drury Lane, in London in 2001 and 2005; and "The Footy Show World Cup Spectacular", broadcast live from the classic Prinzregententheater in Munich, Germany, in 2006.

Over the years he has also been the audience warm-up comedian for shows including The X Factor, 1 vs. 100, Who Wants To Be A Millionaire?, Backberner, Unreal TV, Quiz Master, Australia's Brainiest Celebrity Specials, In Melbourne Tonight, Comedy Inc, Difference Of Opinion and Temptation. Since 2011 he has been the audience warm-up artist for The Marngrook Footy Show.

He is also often employed as the Master of Ceremonies at big television events like the annual Australian Film Institute Awards.

And he has hosted pilots for his own television game shows including Punchlines (Seven Network), Pro-Am Quiz (Nine Network) and Run for the Money (Network Ten).

=== Theatre ===
Kewley spent seven years at Nero's Fiddle Theatre Restaurant (1984–1990), five years at French Nickers Theatre Restaurant (1991–1995) and ten years at Hunchbax Theatre Restaurant (1996–2006) performing in shows which he also wrote and directed. He created numerous shows at Hunchbax, including "Good Will Humping", "Forrest Hump", "Bravehump", "Raiders of the Lost Hump", "Dude, Where's My Hump?", "The Spy Who Humped Me", "Crouching Tiger, Hidden Humpy", "The Full Humpy" and "Hump-erectomy," many of which were choreographed by Jodie Greenwood.

In 2009, he appeared in the premiere of the Australian plays Friday Night, In Town and She's My Baby, and starred in the stage show Call Girl the Musical.

In 2010, he was cast as 'Glad Hand' in the revival of West Side Story and (from August 2010 to January 2011) played the role at Melbourne's famous Regent Theatre, Perth's Burswood Theatre, Adelaide's Festival Theatre, and the Lyric Theatre in Brisbane.

In 2011, as part of the 25th Annual Melbourne International Comedy Festival he starred in the play It's All Fun and Games (Until Someone Gets Hurt). Since 2011 he has played the lead roles in plays including Death of A Comedian, Equus, Flesh Wound, and Doomsday Devices.

=== Producer ===
In 1986, he wrote and produced the short thriller The Lake, and co-produced and co-directed the comedy The Skateboard Saga (1987) which won the 1987 Film Victoria Trophy; was named Best Short Film at the 1987 Melbourne International Film Festival; won Best Film at the 1987 Ten Best On 8 Film Festival.

He has produced over 200 television commercials and from 1989 to 1991 he was one of the writers and presenters and Associate Producer of Network Ten's Candid Camera On Australia and TVNZ's Candid Camera On New Zealand.

In 2003, he wrote, directed and appeared in the short comedy film Image Is Everything, shot as part of the Celebrity Film-maker Challenge for the Newcastle Shoot Out in NSW.

In 2000, he co-produced Funny By George: The George Wallace Story for ABC-TV, a one-hour documentary that detailed the life and times of George Wallace – Australia's great vaudeville performer and first comedy "movie star".

In 2001, he co-wrote and produced Young Talent Time Tells All, which became one of the highest rating Network Ten programs of the year, and in 2003 he created and co-produced a three-hour "special edition" DVD titled Young Talent Time: The Collection for Universal Pictures.

=== Radio ===
Between 2010 and 2013, Kewley appeared on Denis Walter's afternoon radio program on 3AW in a regular segment called Trivia with Jeremy Kewley.

== Child sex abuse allegations and conviction ==
In December 2014, Kewley was charged with, and on 26 November 2015 he pleaded guilty to, multiple child sex offences. His abuses took place between 1989 and 2011. Most of his 16 victims, boys aged 9 to 14, were assaulted in 2011 during a series of screen tests.

Kewley pleaded guilty to 19 charges, including indecent acts with a child under 16, indecent assault, and making and possessing child pornography, which occurred between 1989 and 2011. On 17 May 2016, Kewley was sentenced to 23 months imprisonment.

On 28 November 2018, concerns were raised that Kewley had worked at a Victorian primary school during the Victorian state election.

== Community work ==
In 2006, Kewley was named Bega Valley Shire's Australia Day Ambassador.
