= You Have Been Watching (Australian TV program) =

- Genre: Comedy, review, panel discussion
- Presented by: Peter Berner
- Country of origin: Australia
- Original language: English
- No. of seasons: 1
- No. of episodes: 10

Production
- Executive producers: Darren Chau (The Comedy Channel); Courtney Gibson; Johnny Lowry
- Running time: 30 minutes (with commercials)
- Production company: Southern Star Entertainment

Original release
- Network: The Comedy Channel
- Release: 17 February – 21 April 2011

Related
- You Have Been Watching

You Have Been Watching is an Australian television comedy panel discussion and review television program (based upon the UK program of the same name). Hosted by comedian Peter Berner and featuring special guests, the program is produced by the same team behind Balls of Steel Australia. It was commissioned by The Comedy Channel Group Programming Director Darren Chau and premiered on the channel on 17 February 2011, and ranks in the top 5 highest rating local production series in The Comedy Channel's history.

== Episodes ==
Air date	Subject	Guest panellists
17 February 2011	Crime and Punishment	John Wood; Meshel Laurie; Aamer Rahman
24 February 2011	Medical	Ryan Shelton; Fiona O'Loughlin; Dave O'Neil
3 March 2011	Talent Shows	Chris Taylor; Cal Wilson; Rob Mills
10 March 2011	Game Shows	Craig Reucassel; Meshel Laurie; Aamer Rahman
17 March 2011	Love and Dating	Dave Thornton; Gretel Killeen; Jeff Green
24 March 2011	Food	Jason Byrne; Jo Stanley; Mikey Robins
31 March 2011	Tough TV	Ryan Shelton; Felicity Ward; Eddie Ifft
7 April 2011	The Paranormal	Mark Watson; Cal Wilson; James Mathison
14 April 2011	Kids TV	Rhys Muldoon; Meshel Laurie; James Kerley
21 April 2011	Beauty and Fashion	Adam Richard; Denise Drysdale; Tommy Dean
