= Doug MacLeod (writer) =

Australian writer (born 1959)

- Born: Doug MacLeod; 13 October 1959
- Died: 22 November 2021 (aged 62)
- Occupations: Author, scriptwriter, playwright

Doug MacLeod (13 October 1959 – 22 November 2021) was an Australian writer of books, television, and theatre.

== Television ==
MacLeod was a working writer for ABC Radio's comedy department in the 1980s, before spending two years as head writer of Network Ten's The Comedy Company. He was a writer on the sketch comedy programs Fast Forward and Full Frontal. He was the script editor of Kath & Kim while the series aired on the ABC.

As a break from sketch comedy he co-wrote five episodes of SeaChange with Andrew Knight.

He co-wrote the animated children's series Dogstar which won him the inaugural John Hinde Award for science fiction in 2008. He also worked on series two in 2011 with co-writer Philip Dalkin.

In 2008 MacLeod won the Fred Parsons Award for Contribution to Australian Comedy at the AWGIE Awards.

== Theatre ==
MacLeod was the writer of Call Girl the Musical, with Tracy Harvey which performed two seasons in Melbourne.

With John Clarke, he co-wrote a musical adaptation of the children's book Snugglepot and Cuddlepie, titled The Adventures of Snugglepot & Cuddlepie and Little Ragged Blossom.

== Death ==
MacLeod died in Melbourne on 22 November 2021, aged 62, after some years of poor health.

== Books and published works ==
MacLeod wrote the following books, most for children and young people:

- Hippopotabus
- The Story of Admiral Sneeze
- The Tales of Tuttle
- In the Garden of Bad Things
- Knees
- Two Tuttle Tales
- The Fed Up Family Album
- Frank Boulderbuster
- Sister Madge's Book of Nuns
- Kissing the Toad and Other Stories
- Ten Monster Islands
- Electric Eels and Other Shocking Things
- From Pen to Print
- P'tik, P'tok
- The Southern Cross Herald
- Whipperginnie
- Siggy and Amber
- The Birdsville Monster
- Song of the Shearer
- Out to Lunch
- Tumble Turn
- Spiky Spunky, My Pet Monkey
- Leon Stumble's Book of Stupid Fairytales
- I'm Being Stalked by a Moon Shadow
- Kevin the Troll
- The Clockwork Forest
- My Extraordinary Life & Death
- The Life of a Teenage Body-snatcher
- The Shiny Guys
- Tigers on the Beach
