= TV1 (Australian TV channel) =

Australian subscription television channel

- Country: Australia

Programming
- Language: English
- Picture format: 576i (SDTV 16:9)

Ownership
- Owner: NBCUniversal; Sony Pictures Television; CBS Studios International
- Parent: TV1 General Entertainment Partnership
- Sister channels: SF; Universal Channel; 13th Street; Style Network; E! Nickelodeon; MTV

History
- Launched: 2 April 1995
- Closed: 31 December 2013
- Replaced by: TV Hits

TV1 was an Australian subscription channel. The station closed on 31 December 2013, along with its sister channel SF. It was replaced on 1 January 2014 by TVH!ts.

== History ==
TV1 launched as part of the original Galaxy line-up. The channel was jointly owned by Sony Pictures Television and CBS Studios International (CBS Corporation), and NBCUniversal (Comcast). The channel broadcast numerous sitcoms, dramas, Pre-2006 movies and other programming. It referred to itself as 'Always Great'. TV1 has also produced original comedy programs including Stupid, Stupid Man and the Australian drama Killing Time.

TV1 was also operated by the same owners as SF, which was NBCUniversal, Sony Pictures, and CBS Studios International.

On 1 June 2010 TV1 switched from the standard 4:3 picture format to the 16:9 picture format, as part of Foxtel's plan to have every channel in widescreen by the end of 2010.

It was initially thought that there would be no benefit to consumers for TV1 to switch from 4:3 to 16:9, as most of its programming was in 4:3. However, recent additions to TV1's programming schedule has resulted in increased 16:9 content. This meant that moving to a widescreen format would, in fact, be the best choice for TV1 as it would accommodate the increasing number of widescreen programs that it originally cropped to a 4:3 or 14:9 ratio.

In 2012 TV1 announced a restructure retrenching several of its executives.

On 16 August 2013, it was announced that TV1's carriage agreement with Foxtel was set to expire in December 2013, and that negotiations had failed to create a new carriage deal. With Foxtel being the sole subscription TV provider in Australia, this meant that it was expected that TV1, and its sister channel SF, would close. Foxtel announced that a general-entertainment channel would replace TV1 and would continue to offer the main content currently on offer. TV1 later announced they were exploring options in which they could continue operations, such as launching their service on IPTV, Crackle, or Apple TV services. On 16 October 2013, it was announced that TVH!TS would replace TV1 on Foxtel. Ultimately, TV1, along with sister channel SF closed at midnight on 31 December 2013.

== Final Programming ==
=== Drama ===
- The Big C
- Columbo (moved to 13th Street)
- Covert Affairs (moved to Universal Channel)
- CSI: Crime Scene Investigation (moved to TVH!TS)
- CSI: Miami (moved to TVH!TS)
- CSI: NY (moved to TVH!TS)
- Diagnosis: Murder (moved to FOX Classics)
- Drop Dead Diva (moved to SoHo)
- Fairly Legal
- The Good Wife (moved to SoHo)
- House (moved to Universal Channel)
- JAG
- Law & Order: Criminal Intent (moved to Universal Channel)
- Law & Order: LA
- Law & Order: Special Victims Unit (moved to Universal Channel)
- Law & Order: UK (moved to 13th Street)
- Monk (moved to 13th Street)
- NCIS (moved to TVH!TS)
- NCIS: Los Angeles (moved to FOX8)
- Psych (moved to Universal Channel)
- Royal Pains
- Suits (moved to Universal Channel)
- Northern Exposure
- NUMB3RS
- Snowy River: The McGregor Saga
- Walker, Texas Ranger

=== Comedy ===
- 30 Rock (moved to Universal Channel)
- Becker
- Bewitched (moved to 111)
- The Brady Bunch
- Cheers (moved to 111)
- Community
- Everybody Loves Raymond (moved to TVH!TS)
- Family Ties
- Frasier plus Analysing The Laughter special (moved to 111)
- Get Smart (moved to 111)
- Happy Days
- Hogan's Heroes (moved to FOX Classics)
- I Dream of Jeannie (moved to 111)
- Just Shoot Me! (moved to 111)
- Married... with Children (plus reunion special)
- Mr. Bean
- The Nanny (plus reunion special) (moved to TVH!TS)
- NewsRadio
- The Office
- Only Fools and Horses
- Rules of Engagement (moved to 111)
- Sabrina, the Teenage Witch
- Seinfeld (plus The Seinfeld Story) (moved to TVH!TS)
- Starsky & Hutch
- 'Til Death
- Tiny Toon Adventures
- Will & Grace (moved to 111)
- Who's the Boss?

=== Movies ===
- 13 Going On 30 (2004)
- 50 First Dates (2004)
- Addams Family Values (1993)
- Annie (1982)
- A League of Their Own (1992)
- Almost Famous (2000)
- America's Sweethearts (2001)
- Anger Management (2003)
- The Animal (2001)
- Apollo 13 (1995)
- Babe (1995)
- Back to the Future (1985)
- Bad Boys (1995)
- Bad Boys II (2003)
- Batman (1989)
- Batman Returns (1992)
- Batman Forever (1995)
- Batman & Robin (1997)
- Billy Madison (1995)
- Bewitched (2005)
- Black Hawk Down (2001)
- The Blue Lagoon (1980)
- The Blues Brothers (1980)
- The Cable Guy (1996)
- Casper (1995)
- Charlotte's Web (2006)
- Christmas with the Kranks (2004)
- Click (2006)
- Clueless (1995)
- Conspiracy Theory (1997)
- The Da Vinci Code (2006)
- Daddy Day Care (2003)
- Deuce Bigalo: European Gigolo (2005)
- E.T. the Extra-Terrestrial (1982)
- Erin Brockovich (1999)
- First Blood (1982)
- Footloose (1984)
- Forrest Gump (1994)
- The Frighteners (1996)
- Fun With Dick & Jane (2005)
- Ghostbusters (1984)
- Grease (1978)
- The Green Mile (1999)
- Good Luck Chuck (2007)
- Groundhog Day (1993)
- Happy Gilmore (1996)
- Hitch (2005)
- Hook (1991) (moved to Nickelodeon)
- How to Lose a Guy in Ten Days (2003)
- In the Line of Fire (1993)
- The Italian Job (2003)
- Jaws (1975)
- Joe Dirt (2001)
- Jumanji (1995)
- Jurassic Park (1993)
- The Karate Kid (1984)
- Legally Blonde (2001)
- The Longest Yard (2005)
- Look Who's Talking (1989)
- Maid in Manhattan (2002)
- Man of the House (2005)
- Matilda (1996)
- Mean Girls (2004)
- Men In Black (1997)
- Muppets from Space (1999)
- The Missing (2003)
- My Best Friend's Wedding (1997)
- My Girl (1991)
- My Girl 2 (1994)
- The Net (1995)
- Not Another Teen Movie (2001)
- The Notebook (2004)
- The Nutty Professor (1996)
- Panic Room (2002)
- The Peacemaker (1997)
- Philadelphia (1993)
- The Pursuit of Happyness (2006)
- The Quick and the Dead (1995)
- Rain Man (1988)
- Rambo (2008)
- Rambo: First Blood Part II (1985)
- Rambo III (1988)
- RV: Runaway Vacation (2006)
- Scarface (1983)
- Scream (1996)
- The Silence of the Lambs (1991)
- Sleepless in Seattle (1993)
- Space Jam (1996)
- Spanglish (2004)
- Superbad (2007)
- S.W.A.T. (2003)
- Talladega Nights: The Ballad of Ricky Bobby (2006)
- The Terminator (1984)
- Terminator 2: Judgment Day (1991)
- Top Gun (1985)
- Thelma & Louise (1991)
- Twins (1988)
- What Dreams May Come (1998)
- White Chicks (2004)
- Witness (1985)
- XXX (2002)
- XXX: The Next Level (titled XXX: State Of The Union) (2005)
- A Few Good Men (1992)
- Almost Famous (2000)
- Bad Santa (2003)
- The Bodyguard (1992)
- The Bone Collector (1999) (moved to Foxtel Movies)
- Charlie's Angels (2000) (moved to Foxtel Movies)
- Charlie's Angels: Full Throttle (2003)
- The Devil's Own (1997) (moved to Foxtel Movies)
- Four Weddings and a Funeral (1994)
- Hollywood Homicide (2003)
- Jerry Maguire (1996)
- Legally Blonde 2: Red, White & Blonde (2003)
- Love Actually (2003)
- The Mask of Zorro (1998) (moved to Foxtel Movies)
- Misery (1990)
- Mona Lisa Smile (2003)
- Mr. Deeds (2002) (moved to Foxtel Movies)
- Notting Hill (1999)
- The Pelican Brief (1993)
- Platoon (1986)
- Revenge of the Nerds (1984)
- Rocky (film series) (I, II, III, IV, V, and VI) (1976, 1979, 1982, 1985, 1990, and 2006)
- Saturday Night Fever (1977) (moved to Foxtel Movies)
- The Searchers (1956)
- Stripes (1981)
- Tears of the Sun (2003)
- Universal Soldier (1991)
- The Usual Suspects (1995) (moved to Foxtel Movies)
- Welcome to the Jungle (2003)
- When Harry Met Sally... (1989) (moved to FOX Classics)

=== Other shows ===
- The Addams Family (1964)
- ALF (moved to 111)
- Animaniacs (1993)
- The A-Team
- Batman: The Animated Series
- Blankety Blanks
- Charmed (moved to SF)
- The Cosby Show (moved to 111)
- Dawson's Creek (moved to 111)
- Diff'rent Strokes (moved to 111)
- The Dukes of Hazzard
- Hawaii Five-O
- I love Lucy (moved to FOX Classics)
- Knight Rider (moved to SF)
- Looney Tunes
- The Love Boat
- MacGyver (moved to 111, then FOX Classics, then returned to 111)
- Magnum P.I.
- McCloud
- Miami Vice (moved to 111, then FOX Classics, then returned to 111)
- The Munsters
- Murder, She Wrote (moved to 111, then FOX Classics)
- Ned and Stacey
- The Partridge Family (moved to 111)
- Quincy, M.E.
- Roseanne (moved to 111)
- Stargate SG-1 (moved to SF)
- Star Trek: Deep Space Nine (moved to SF)
- Star Trek: Enterprise (moved to SF)
- Star Trek: The Next Generation (moved to SF)
- Star Trek: The Original Series (moved to SF)
- Star Trek: Voyager (moved to SF)
- Thunderbirds (moved to SF)
- Xena: Warrior Princess (moved to SF)
- The Young Doctors
