= Trevor Marmalade =

Australian comedian

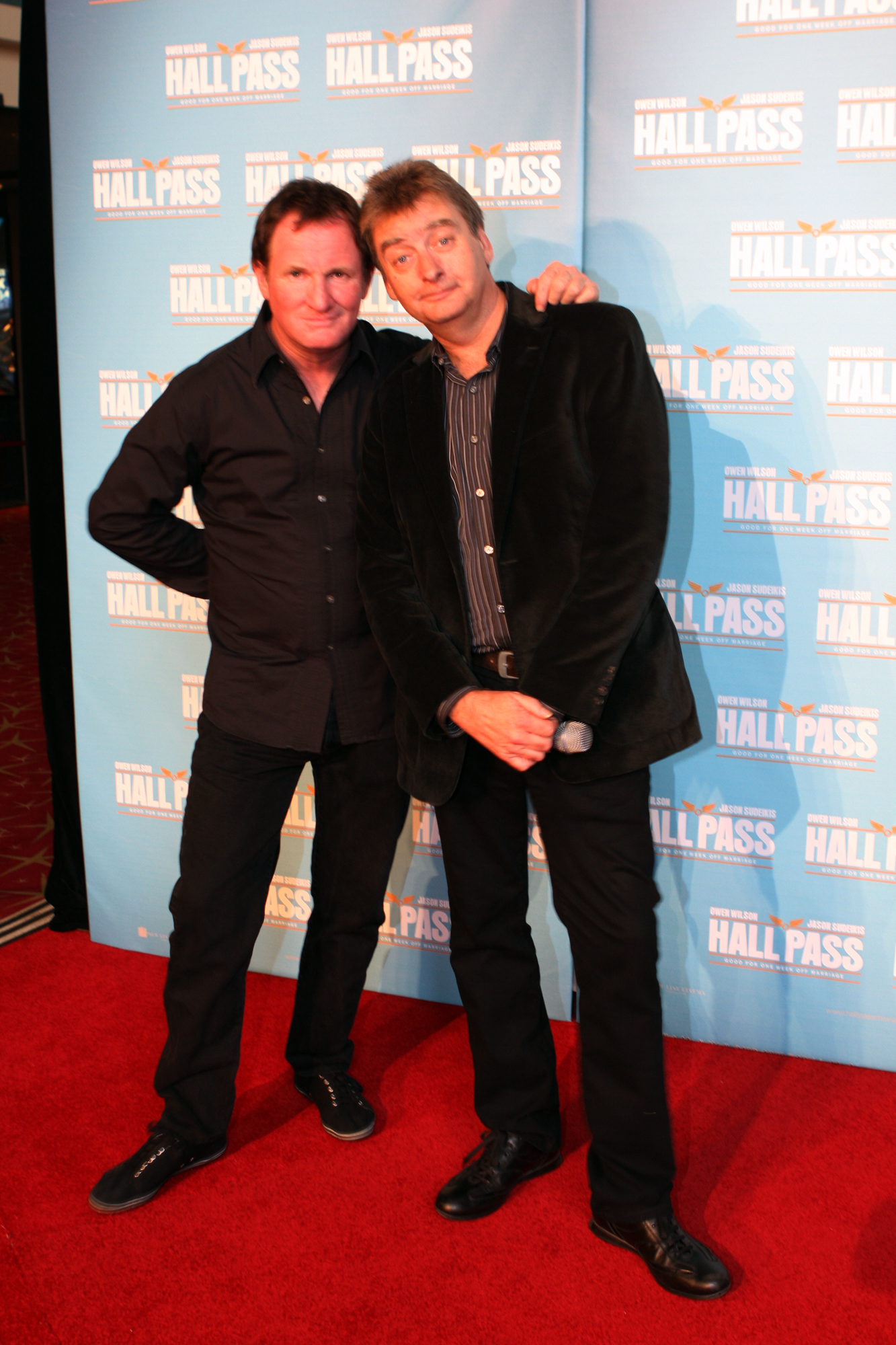
- Russell Gilbert (L) and Trevor Marmalade (R) at the Australian premiere of Hall Pass, 2011
- Born: 26 April 1962 (age 64)
- Occupations: comedian, television and radio presenter
- Years active: 1980s - present

Trevor Marmalade (born Jason van de Velde, 26 April 1962) is an Australian comedian and radio and television presenter. Marmalade is of Dutch descent and grew up in the Melbourne suburb of Surrey Hills.

== Career ==
During the 1980s, Marmalade was a member of the alternative comedy show Punter to Punter with Tracy Harvey as Tammy Whittle, Tony Rickards as Con Marasco, Mitchell Faircloth as Slim Whittle and John Rothfield as Dr Turf. The show was broadcast on 3RRR on Saturday mornings after the Coodabeen Champions.

Marmalade is also a successful standup comic going back to his appearances in the early 1980s at "Le Joke" and "The Last Laugh". He also appeared on the long-running television show, Hey Hey It's Saturday, from 1991 to 1999.

Marmalade appeared on the Nine television network's The AFL Footy Show from 1994 to 2008, as a comedian based behind the bar. At the end of 2008, his contract for the show was not renewed and the behind the bar role was dropped altogether. Marmalade did return for one show, on 7 April 2011, to help celebrate its 500th episode. He then returned once more in September 2019 for its last-ever grand final spectacular.

In December 2010, he returned to television as the host of a show titled Statesmen of Comedy. It was broadcast for one season of 15 shows, on Foxtel's The Comedy Channel.

In 2012, Trevor was the presenter of a major television and social media advertising campaign for Lawson's bread. The campaign used humour to offer light-hearted advice to parents dealing with stay-at-home adult children.

Marmalade has also written several comedy-based books, including Any danger? published in 1998 and Trevor Marmalade's footy show jokes published in 2001.

== Personal life ==
Marmalade was married to Kerrie and they have two children. They lived in St Kilda, Victoria. Trevor is a fan of the North Melbourne Football Club.
