= W Channel =

W Channel can refer to:

- W (British TV channel), UK TV channel
- W Network, Canadian cable channel
- SoHo (Australian TV channel), Australian cable channel (formerly called W Channel)
