= Comedy Gold =

Comedy Gold may refer to:

- Comedy Gold (TV series), a 2008 Australian television series
- Comedy Gold (TV channel), a Canadian specialty channel formerly known as TV Land Canada
