= Statesmen of Comedy =

- Genre: Comedy
- Created by: Trevor Marmalade
- Presented by: Trevor Marmalade
- Opening theme: Yuri Worontschak – Kinesound
- Ending theme: Yuri Worontschak – Kinesound
- Country of origin: Australia
- Original language: English
- No. of seasons: 1
- No. of episodes: 15

Production
- Executive producers: Darren Chau, Cos Cardone, Trevor Marmalade
- Producer: Jon Olb
- Running time: 30 minutes (including commercials)

Original release
- Network: The Comedy Channel
- Release: 5 December 2010 – 13 March 2011

Statesmen of Comedy was a half-hour comedy panel show hosted by Trevor Marmalade. Trevor talks with Australia's finest comedians, not only about the skills of their trade, but also provides a range of off-the-wall topics inviting them to flex their comedy muscles.

== Episodes ==
=== Season 1 (2010-2011) ===
- Episode 1 – Features: Shane Bourne, Jane Kennedy, Tim Smith
- Episode 2 – Features: Glenn Robbins, Greg Fleet, Jason Stevens
- Episode 3 – Features: Peter Rowsthorn, Jeff Stilson, Greg Fleet
- Episode 4 – Features: Red Symons, Wilbur Wilde, Brian Nankervis
- Episode 5 – Features: Jeff Green, Colin Lane, Russell Gilbert
- Episode 6 – Features: Steve Vizard, Andrew Goodone, Tim Smith
- Episode 7 – Features: Vince Sorrenti, Elliot Goblet, Tim Smith
- Episode 8 – Features: Russell Gilbert, Matthew Quartermaine, Jimeoin
- Episode 9 – Features: Shane Bourne, Jeff Stilson, Glenn Robbins
- Episode 10 – Features: Matt Parkinson, Anthony Morgan, Greg Fleet
- Episode 11 – Features: Paul Calleja, Cal Wilson, Dave O'Neil
- Episode 12 – Features: Peter Rowsthorn, Rachel Berger, Anthony Morgan
- Episode 13 – Unscreened Highlights Part 1 Special
- Episode 14 – Unscreened Highlights Part 2 Special
- Episode 15 – The Very Best of Special
