= Call Girl the Musical =

Musical

- Music: Tracy Harvey; Jack Howard
- Lyrics: Tracy Harvey; Doug MacLeod
- Book: Tracy Harvey; Doug MacLeod
- Productions: 2009 Melbourne

Call Girl the Musical is a musical conceived by Australian TV comedian and writer Tracy Harvey and Doug MacLeod, with musical arrangements from Jack Howard and direction from Bryce Ives.

== Background ==
In 2004, Tracy Harvey started writing a sitcom about a customer contact centre. Script editor Doug MacLeod suggested that the material would make a good musical.

The show had a preview season in October 2008 at the Phoenix Theatre in Elwood directed by Bryce Ives and choreographed by Dave Harford. The preview season starred Alan Fletcher from the Australian TV soap opera Neighbours, with cameo (voice) appearances from Steve Vizard and Australian TV legend Bert Newton.

After the preview season, the show was developed and a new season began in April 2009 at Chapel off Chapel, South Yarra. The 2009 season again featured Tracy Harvey as Jean Brown, with Jeremy Kewley replacing Alan Fletcher as male lead Frank McGee, and featured new voice-overs from Derek Guille.

== Synopsis ==
It is a musical comedy set in a telephone call centre, following Jean Brown on her first day at work at "We Care Marketing", a dubious customer contact centre populated by flawed characters - including a money hungry man-eater, a wheeler dealer salesman, a vacuous brat and a desperate-to-prove-himself marketing executive with zero training. Despite her heartfelt reluctance to fleece customers and her sabotage from entrenched employees, Jean puts her best foot forward.
