= Comedy Gold (TV series) =

Australian reality TV series

- Comedy Gold logo
- Genre: Comedy
- Created by: Darren Chau
- Written by: Darren Chau
- Presented by: Cameron Knight
- Starring: Julia Morris; Jason Gann; Rob Hibbert; Sean Condon; Steve Kearney; Troy Kinne; Monty Franklin
- Country of origin: Australia
- Original language: English

Production
- Executive producer: Darren Chau
- Running time: 60 minutes (including commercials)

Original release
- Network: The Comedy Channel
- Release: 26 January 2008

Comedy Gold is a comedy reality TV show, created and produced by Darren Chau. The format documented the nationwide search for Australia's next hit TV comedy show. The program was filmed at the 2007 SPAA conference on the Gold Coast and premiered on Foxtel’s the Comedy Channel on Australia Day 2008. The contestants submitted ideas for a thirteen-part half-hour comedy series to a panel of judges, and the show offered up $25,000 to the winning TV show towards its development.

Finalists included Stephen Kearney of Los Trios Ringbarkus fame. Jason Gann was the runner up with his project Jason and the residents, however the eventual winners were Rob Hibbert and Sean Condon with their project I can't believe it's not better.

Executive Produced by the Comedy Channel Programming Director Darren Chau and Produced by Rohan Timlock of Kenny, I can't believe it's not better premiered in December 2009.

The competition returned the following year and was hosted by H.G. Nelson. Adam Zwar was shortlisted as a finalist with Agony Uncles.
