= You Have Been Watching =

British quiz show

- Genre: Comedy panel game
- Presented by: Charlie Brooker
- Opening theme: "Golden Gun" by Suede
- Country of origin: United Kingdom
- Original language: English
- No. of series: 2
- No. of episodes: 16 (list of episodes)

Production
- Production locations: Riverside Studios (2009); BBC Television Centre (2010)
- Running time: 35–40 minutes
- Production company: Zeppotron

Original release
- Network: Channel 4 E4 (4 August 2010)
- Release: 7 July 2009 – 4 August 2010

You Have Been Watching is a British comedy panel game presented by Charlie Brooker, produced by Zeppotron for Channel 4 and filmed at BBC Television Centre (pilot and series 2) and Riverside Studios (series 1) in London. It first aired on 7 July 2009 for a weekly eight-episode run. Each week Brooker is accompanied by a panel of three guests. The focus of the quiz is television - before recording, guest panellists watch selected episodes of various television shows. They then may be asked to suggest hypothetical improvements to the format, critically assess it or to answer quiz questions on the content.

The title derives from the caption David Croft used to list the cast members in his trademark end credits.

A second series of the show began on 15 April 2010. The final episode, a crime special, was postponed until August due to the Cumbria shootings having taken place that same week.

The series has a website, "YHBW! TV Club", providing the show with an interactive element. A topic of the next week's show is revealed at the end of each episode so that viewers could watch and submit their own comments.

An Australian version of the show, written and hosted by comedian Peter Berner, premiered on The Comedy Channel on 17 February 2011.

== Transmissions ==
Series	Episodes	Originally released	
Series	Episodes	First released	Last released
1	8	7 July 2009	25 August 2009
2	8	15 April 2010	4 August 2010
