= Punter to Punter =

1980 Australian radio show

Punter to Punter is a 1980s Australian radio show that ran on 3RRR for five years and then on 3XY for three and was reformed in 1990 on FOX-FM as The Punters. The main cast was Mitchell Faircloth as Slim Whittle, John Rothfield as Dr. Turf and Tony Rickards as Con Marasco.

The show grew out of a 1980 racing tips segment on a morning sports show that featured Simon Thorpe and Rickards as Vince and Con Marasco. Faircloth joined them and they got their own show which began in 1981 by Thorpe, Rickards and Faircloth, with Rothfield joining as a special guest and soon moving up to being a regular.

Other cast members have included Jason van de Velde as Trevor Marmalade, Tracy Harvey as Tammy Whittle, Graeme Sefton as Young Graeme, David Shephard as Yonny Stone, Gary Adams and Deb Force.
