= Toon Time (TV series) =

- Genre: Comedy; Cartoon; Variety
- Created by: Darren Chau
- Written by: Darren Chau; Brose Avard
- Directed by: Pip Mushin
- Presented by: Penelope Mitchell; Dickie Knee
- Country of origin: Australia
- Original language: English
- No. of seasons: 2
- No. of episodes: 258

Production
- Executive producer: Darren Chau
- Producer: Brose Avard
- Production locations: Melbourne, Victoria
- Running time: 30 minutes (including commercials)

Original release
- Network: 111 Hits
- Release: 18 July 2011 – 2012

Toon Time is an Australian television entertainment programme 111 Hits created and executive produced by Darren Chau, and hosted by Penelope Mitchell and Dickie Knee (John Blackman) from Hey Hey It's Saturday fame. The programme features Bugs Bunny and the popular Warner Brothers animated characters, plus comedy segments, competitions and specials guests. Toon Time premiered on 18 July 2011 at 5.30pm.

Penelope Mitchell hosted the program. The programme is the highest rating local production on Channel 111HITS, and its promotional campaign won 5 Gold Promax Awards.

== Special guests ==
- Molly Meldrum
- George Kapiniaris
- Simon Palomares
- Tim Ellis
- Anthony Harkin (Rock of Ages)
- Brent Hill (Rock of Ages)
- Brad Johnson (AFL footballer)
- David Cotter
- Aeriel Manx
- Andrew Welsh (AFL footballer)
- Cameron Tragardh (NBL basketballer)
- Frank Lotito
