= Cameron Knight =

Australian actor and comedian

Cameron Knight is an Australian comedian and actor.

== Early life and education ==
Cameron Knight was born in Cummins, South Australia.

He studied at the Centre for the Performing Arts in Adelaide.

== Career ==
Knight made his break into television as a member of the Big Bite sketch comedy show and then became a regular presenter on Foxtel's The Comedy Channel. His half-sister, Nikki Dwyer, is a former newsreader for Network Ten in Adelaide. In 1999, Knight guested in an episode of the Australian soap opera Neighbours, followed by an appearance in police drama Blue Heelers.

In 2006, he became the host of the Australian made stand up TV show, Stand Up Australia, shown 5 nights a week on The Comedy Channel. He has also hosted a variety of different shows on Foxtel, namely Chain Reaction on Fox 8, We'll Call You on The Comedy Channel and also the second series of Hit & Run on The Comedy Channel. In 2007, Knight was the host of the Australia heat of Last Comic Standing season 5 which aired on Fox8 and received an ASTRA Award nomination for Best Male Presenter in 2008. Knight was a founding member of Sydney-based singing group, MANCHOIR.

He received a 4.5 star review for his comedy solo – Almost Bulletproof, backing up a highly coveted 5 star review of his previous show – 100 Percenter. Both shows gained national Comedy festival runs of sold-out performances and nominations for Best Comedy Show in the 2014 and 2015 Perth Fringe. These were also performed to sell out encore performances at the Sydney Comedy Store. Knight has featured at the televised Montreal Just For Laughs Showcase at the Sydney Opera House at the end of 2015 as well as the televised Sydney Comedy Festival Gala on the Comedy Channel in 2014.

His television credits include ABC's Backseat Drivers, being called back for multiple episodes; and Soul Mates and Soul Mates 2, playing the notorious character, Dan Bingle. He was also cast in the ABC series How Not to Behave in 2015 and was seen on the sketch series on ABC, Wham Bam Thankyou Ma'am.

Knight has regularly appeared on Today and has co hosted the morning show, Studio 10 on Channel 10.

In 2016, Knight was the co-host of the Channel 9 show Unreal Estate with Kate Langbroek.
