= A Night at the Festival Club =

- Genre: stand-up comedy
- Created by: Darren Chau
- Directed by: Jordan Robinson
- Presented by: Adam Hills & Jason Byrne (2008), Josh Thomas (2010)
- Starring: Des Bishop, Hannah Gadsby, Justin Hamilton, Adam Hills, Claire Hooper, Josie Long, Josh Thomas, Mark Watson, Harley Breen, Melinda Buttle, Smart Casual, Dead Cat Bounce, Reginald D. Hunter, Tommy Little, Kate Micucci, Celia Pacquola, David Quirk
- Opening theme: Yuri Worontschak
- Country of origin: Australia
- Original language: English
- No. of seasons: 2

Production
- Executive producers: Darren Chau, Ted Robinson, Susan Provan
- Running time: 60 minutes (with commercials)
- Production companies: GNW TV Productions, Foxtel, Melbourne International Comedy Festival

Original release
- Network: The Comedy Channel
- Release: 2 May 2008

A Night at the Festival Club is an Australian stand-up comedy television event, created and executive produced by the Comedy Channel programming director Darren Chau, produced by Ted Robinson and GNW TV Productions for the Comedy Channel, as part of the Melbourne International Comedy Festival. The series centres on bottling the unique comedic live performances and moments that occur late night in the Festival Club, during the Melbourne International Comedy Festival.

A Night at the Festival Club premiered on the Comedy Channel on 2 May 2008 hosted by Adam Hills and Jason Byrne, and features Des Bishop, Hannah Gadsby, Justin Hamilton, Adam Hills, Claire Hooper, Josie Long, Josh Thomas, and Mark Watson.

A Night at the Festival Club then returned to the Comedy Channel on 13 May 2010, hosted by Josh Thomas, and features Harley Breen, Melinda Buttle, Smart Casual, Dead Cat Bounce, Reginald D. Hunter, Tommy Little, Kate Micucci, Celia Pacquola and David Quirk.

A Night at the Festival Club was then adapted into ABC's Comedy Up Late which aired every night of the festival in a half hour format.
