= List of You Have Been Watching episodes =

This is a list of episodes from the British comedy panel game television show You Have Been Watching. As of 4 August 2010, 16 episodes have aired across two series on Channel 4 and E4.

== Series overview ==
Series	Episodes	Originally released	
Series	Episodes	First released	Last released
1	8	7 July 2009	25 August 2009
2	8	15 April 2010	4 August 2010

== Episodes ==
=== Pilot ===
Recording date	Air date	Episode no.	Guest panellists	Winner(s)	Shows discussed
31 January 2009	Unbroadcast	Pilot	Terry Christian; Rufus Hound; Jamelia; David Mitchell		24; Celebrity Big Brother 6

=== Series 1 (2009) ===
Recording date	Air date	Episode no.	Guest panellists	Winner(s)	Shows discussed
5 July 2009	7 July 2009	1	Richard Herring; Rufus Hound; Jamelia	Richard Herring	TV Club: The One Show; Come Dine with Me; Deadliest Warrior
12 July 2009	14 July 2009	2	Grace Dent; Josie Long; Frank Skinner	Frank Skinner	TV Club: Torchwood; Michael Jackson memorial service One & Other
19 July 2009	21 July 2009	3	Frankie Boyle; Sarah Millican; Reece Shearsmith	Reece Shearsmith	TV Club: Inside Nature's Giants; The Got Talent series Tony Stockwell's Psychic Academy
18 July 2009	28 July 2009	4	Richard Bacon; Frankie Boyle; Josie Long	Richard Bacon	TV Club: The Jeremy Kyle Show; My Life as an Animal; The Swan
2 August 2009	4 August 2009	5	Martin Freeman; Reginald D. Hunter; Liza Tarbuck	Liza Tarbuck	TV Club: Casualty; Young, Dumb and Living Off Mum various cookery shows, mainly Iron Chef America.
9 August 2009	11 August 2009	6	Frankie Boyle; Germaine Greer; Frank Skinner	Frank Skinner	TV Club: Dragons' Den; Deal or No Deal? Dog the Bounty Hunter
16 August 2009	18 August 2009	7	Ben Miller; David Mitchell; Holly Walsh	David Mitchell	TV Club: Desperate Romantics; Total Wipeout; Bibleman; Way of the Master
15 August 2009	25 August 2009	8 (Note: 90s TV Special)	Victoria Coren; Phill Jupitus; Jack Whitehall	Victoria Coren	You Bet! Ring My Bell other 1990s television shows, most of which were sex-themed

=== Series 2 (2010) ===
Recording date	Air date	Episode no.	Guest panellists	Winner(s)	Shows discussed
13 April 2010	15 April 2010	1	David Baddiel; Kevin Bridges; Liza Tarbuck	David Baddiel	TV Club: Doctor Who; Spartacus: Blood and Sand; MasterChef; Jamie Oliver's Food Revolution; The Delicious Miss Dahl
19 April 2010	22 April 2010	2	Sharon Horgan; Jason Manford; Robert Webb	Sharon Horgan; Jason Manford	TV Club: Coach Trip; Britain's Got Talent; UK Election Debate 2010; America's Next Top Model; The Door; How Not to Die; 1000 Ways to Die
26 April 2010	29 April 2010	3	Chris Addison; Rufus Hound; Lauren Laverne	Lauren Laverne	TV Club: Over the Rainbow; EastEnders; Eyewitness; Naked Office; The Human Centipede (First Sequence) (Note: This is actually a movie being discussed and not a TV show.)
4 May 2010	6 May 2010	4 (Note: Election Night Special. Aired in three parts throughout Channel 4's Alternative Election Night.)	Sharon Horgan; Peter Serafinowicz; Robert Webb	Sharon Horgan	2010 UK Election Debates
20 April 2010	13 May 2010	5 (Note: Best of the Bastards Special)	Victoria Coren; David Mitchell; Andy Nyman	Andy Nyman	MANswers; Various bastards in reality shows, including Michael Winner's Dining Stars; 24; Sport Science; Bastards in advertising
17 May 2010	20 May 2010	6	Reginald D. Hunter; Sarah Millican; Peter Serafinowicz	Sarah Millican	Britain's Got Talent; Glee; Man vs. Wild; Junior Apprentice; The Biggest Loser: Couples; Dance Your Ass Off; Style by Jury; Tyrannosaurus Sex
27 April 2010	27 May 2010	7 (Note: Kids' TV Special)	Chris Addison; Holly Walsh; Mark Watson	Chris Addison	Yo Gabba Gabba! Kinderen voor Kinderen; Doggy Poo; The Pioneers of Tomorrow; Hannah Montana; Pipkins; The Tomorrow People; Sesame Street
18 May 2010	4 August 2010 (shown on E4)	8 (Note: Crime Special. Originally scheduled to be broadcast on 3 June 2010, but postponed following the Cumbria shootings.)	Rufus Hound; Armando Iannucci; Josie Long	Armando Iannucci; Josie Long	Crime special: Murder, She Wrote; Miami Vice; Poochinski; CSI:Miami; Various British and American police reality shows America's Most Wanted; Mrs. Columbo
