= Comedy (TV channel) =

Australian television channel

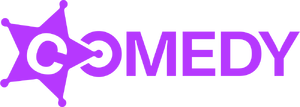
- Country: Australia
- Broadcast area: Australia

Programming
- Language: English
- Picture format: 576i (16:9 SDTV); 1080i (16:9 HDTV)

Ownership
- Owner: Foxtel Networks
- Sister channels: Foxtel Networks channels

History
- Launched: 7 November 2019
- Replaced: The Comedy Channel; Fox Funny (current channel slot)
- Former names: Fox Hits (7 November 2019 – 1 September 2020); Fox Comedy (1 September 2020 – 26 September 2023)

Availability

Streaming media
- Foxtel Go: Channel 114
- Binge: binge.com.au

Comedy (formerly Fox Comedy) is an Australian subscription television channel focused on airing popular sitcoms. The channel launched on 7 November 2019 as Fox Hits.

The network rebranded on 1 September 2020 after ten months, merging with sister network The Comedy Channel to become Fox Comedy. Though it shared a similar name to its former sister network Fox Funny (which carried more contemporary sitcoms), Fox Comedy's schedule originally featured sitcoms ranging from the 80s to around the mid-2000s.

On 1 March 2023, with the Fox Funny channel closing, its content moved over to sister channels Fox Comedy and Fox8. On that date, Fox Comedy moved to replace Fox Funny's slot.

On 26 September 2023, after Real Life launched, the channel rebranded as Comedy.

Logo used from 1 September 2020 – 26 September 2023

== Programming ==
Programming aired on the channel primarily consists of content from Warner Bros Television, Universal Television, ABC Signature, 20th Television, Sony Pictures Television, The Carsey-Werner Company, Canadian Broadcasting Corporation, and CBS Studios alongside its sister companies such as Pop Media Group.

=== Current programming ===
This lists includes:

- According to Jim
- ALF
- Arrested Development
- Brooklyn Nine-Nine
- Cheers
- Community
- DMV
- The Drew Carey Show
- Everybody Loves Raymond
- Frasier
- Happy Endings
- Just Shoot Me!
- The King of Queens
- Married... with Children
- Mad About You
- The Middle
- Mom
- My Name Is Earl
- The Nanny
- The New Adventures of Old Christine
- The Office (2005 TV series)
- Schitt’s Creek
- Seinfeld
- Two Guys and a Girl

=== Former programming ===
- 2 Broke Girls
- 30 Rock
- 3rd Rock from the Sun
- Animal Control
- A.P. Bio
- The Big Bang Theory
- Friends
- Full House
- The Goldbergs
- The Golden Girls
- The Good Place
- How I Met Your Mother
- Malcolm in the Middle
- Mike & Molly
- NewsRadio
- Night Court
- Parks and Recreation
- Please Like Me
- Superstore
- This Time with Alan Partridge
- Wilfred (2007 TV series)
- Will & Grace
- Young Sheldon
