= Darren & Brose (TV series) =

- Genre: Comedy; Talk; Sketch comedy
- Created by: Darren Chau
- Written by: Darren Chau; Brose Avard
- Directed by: Dean Irwin (Studio)
- Presented by: Darren Chau; Brose Avard
- Country of origin: Australia
- Original language: English
- No. of seasons: 1

Production
- Executive producer: Darren Chau
- Producers: Darren Chau; Brose Avard
- Production locations: Melbourne, Victoria
- Editor: Aaron Carroll
- Running time: 30 minutes (including commercials)
- Production company: La Trobe Media Group inc

Original release
- Network: One
- Release: 2 July 2015

Darren & Brose was an Australian late night television comedy programme hosted by Darren Chau and Brose Avard. The show premiered on Thursday 2 July 2015 at 11pm on Network Ten's one.

== Episodes ==
No.	Guests	Original release date
1	Julia Morris, Denise Drysdale, Stefan Dennis, Dave O'Neil, David Reyne, Lawrence Leung and music from Mike Brady	2 July 2015
2	Brian Mannix, Blair McDonough, Christie Whelan, Tim Smith and Kevin Harrington	9 July 2015
3	Max Walker, Sam Pang, Steve Moneghetti, Julia Morris, Christie Whelan, Dickie Knee and music from Krista Polvere	16 July 2015
4	Michala Banas, Toby Truslove, Marty Sheargold, Lawrence Leung, Blair McDonough and music from Elbow Skin	23 July 2015
5	Kate Ceberano, Dylan Lewis, Stefan Dennis, Dave O'Neil and music from Andrew De Silva	30 July 2015
6	Denise Drysdale, David Reyne, Marty Sheargold, Michala Banas and Kate Ceberano	6 August 2015
7	Best of Series 1 compilation and exclusive unaired bonus bits	13 August 2015
