= Unreal Estate (TV series) =

- Genre: Lifestyle
- Presented by: Kate Langbroek; Cameron Knight
- Country of origin: Australia
- Original language: English
- No. of seasons: 1
- No. of episodes: 8

Original release
- Network: Nine Network
- Release: 27 September – 15 November 2016

Unreal Estate is an Australian lifestyle television program which premiered on the Nine Network on 27 September 2016, hosted by Kate Langbroek and comedian Cameron Knight. The series looks at extraordinary Australian homes and meeting the larger-than-life people who live in them.

== Broadcast ==
The series was set to premiere on 31 August 2016, but this was delayed after an additional episode of Married at First Sight Australia was added to the planned timeslot of Unreal Estate shortly before that date. The series was subsequently rescheduled to debut on Tuesday, 27 September 2016 at 8:40 pm.

== Episodes ==
No.	Title	Original release date	Australian viewers
1	"Best Beach Houses"	27 September 2016	769,000
2	"Country Estates"	4 October 2016	696,000
3	"Designer Dreams"	11 October 2016	563,000
4	"Party Houses"	18 October 2016	692,000
5	"Grand Mansions"	25 October 2016	515,000
6	"Luxury Retreats"	1 November 2016	645,000
7	"Urban Fantasies"	8 November 2016	567,000
8	"Artist Houses"	15 November 2016	451,000

== See also ==
- List of programs broadcast by Nine Network
- List of Australian television series
