= Crime (TV channel) =

- Country: Australia
- Broadcast area: Australia

Programming
- Language: English
- Picture format: 1080i (HDTV)
- Timeshift service: Crime +2

Ownership
- Owner: Foxtel Networks
- Sister channels: Foxtel Networks channels

History
- Launched: 1 January 2014; 12 years ago
- Former names: TVHits (2014–2019); FOX Crime (2019–2023)

Availability

Streaming media
- Foxtel Go: Channel 113
- Binge: binge.com.au

Crime (formerly Fox Crime) is an Australian subscription television channel primarily screening crime drama television series. The channel launched on 7 November 2019, replacing TVHits.

== History ==
=== TVHits (2014–2019) ===
In August 2013 it was announced that Foxtel had failed to complete negotiations with the TV1 General Entertainment Partnership for a new carriage deal for their channel TV1, an Australian general entertainment channel dedicated to hit television series. As a result, Foxtel planned to replace it with another general entertainment channel once TV1's carriage deal had expired. In October 2013 it was announced that TVHits, a channel owned and operated by Foxtel Networks, would replace TV1 on 1 January 2014. The branding logo used an exclamation point in place of the "I" character.

TVHits' logo used for its entirety (2014–2019)

On 1 January 2014, the channel launched on pay television provider Foxtel (which included its streaming service Foxtel Go as well as its IPTV service Foxtel Play) as well as on Australian IPTV provider Fetch TV.

On 1 January 2019 TVHits ceased broadcasting on Fetch TV as the provider, and TVHits parent company Foxtel were unable to renew their supply agreement.

==== TVHits programming ====
At launch, TVHits' programming primarily consisted of hit American shows from Warner Bros., Carsey-Werner, Sony Pictures Television, CBS Studios International and NBCUniversal. However, following the rebrand of 111 on 1 November 2015, the channel's sitcoms moved to 111 and as a result, the channel became solely focused on dramas.

FOX Crime logo used from 7 November 2019 – 28 September 2023

=== Fox Crime (2019–2023) ===
In late 2019 Foxtel announced they would launch four new entertainment channels on 7 November 2019, one of which was Fox Crime. Fox Crime was described as offering crime and mystery series such as the CSI and NCIS franchises. This new channel would replace the existing TVHits which offered similar content. These new Fox-branded channels were a means of building and consolidating the Fox brand to combat increasing competition in the subscription television marketplace.

=== Crime (2023–present) ===
On 28 September 2023, the channel was simply rebranded as Crime with a new logo.

== Programming ==
=== Current programming ===
- Cold Case
- Criminal Minds
- CSI: Crime Scene Investigation
- CSI: Miami
- CSI: New York
- NCIS
- NCIS: Los Angeles
- NCIS: New Orleans
- Without a Trace
- Dexter

=== Former programming ===
- Bones

==== As TVHits ====
- The 100
- Blue Bloods
- Damages
- Entertainment Now
- Everybody Loves Raymond
- Friends
- Hawaii Five-0
- How I Met Your Mother
- Law & Order
- The Mentalist
- Mike & Molly
- The Nanny
- Seinfeld
- That '70s Show
- Two and a Half Men
- Under the Dome

== See also ==
- Fox Crime
  - Fox Crime (Asia)
  - Fox Crime (Italy)
