= Tracy Harvey =

Australian comedian

- Born: Tracy
- Citizenship: Australia
- Occupation: Comedian TV presenter Actor Writer

Tracy Harvey is a comedian, TV presenter, actor and writer from Melbourne, Australia.

== Biography ==
Harvey appeared in 'Movement' a web series, The Comedy Company, The Gillies Report, The Big Gig, Hey Hey It's Saturday Smallest Room in the House, Bert Newton Midday Show, The Pack of Women, COPP This!, Waterfront (a miniseries), Dead Gorgeous and TVC's for Sussan, Myer and Pfizer.

Harvey was a weekly co-host on the Derek Guille program on 774 ABC Melbourne.

Harvey was a member of the alternative comedy breakfast panel radio show Punter to Punter with Trevor Marmalade and Dr Turf. The show was aired on 3XY and 3RRR on Saturday mornings after the Coodabeen Champions during the 1980s.

Harvey played Tammy in The Whittle Family, touring nationally and at Melbourne's Last Laugh Theatre Restaurant.

Harvey has written, 'Dear Mum, I'm on the Telly' published by Penguin Books and a weekly column for The Age.

Harvey wrote and appeared in PRICK the Musical and Call Girl the Musical

In 2006 she appeared in the panel discussion "Are women funny?" along with Denise Scott and Shaun Micallief as part of the Williamstown Literary Festival.

In 2015, Harvey composed and directed Out of the Blue, a swimming musical. She also played Lois Pickett in The Dressmaker, directed by Jocelyn Moorhouse the same year.

In 2019, Harvey composed and directed Galapagos, a musical that attempted to discuss the discovery of evolution on the island of Galapagos. The show opened at the Melba Spiegeltent, Collingwood as part of the 2019 Melbourne International Comedy Festival.
