= Darren & Brose =

Australian comedian

Darren & Brose are Darren Chau and Brose Avard, two Australia-based comedy writers and performers who first met while studying media at La Trobe University. Chau had been working with the comedy ensemble Chop-Socky, while Avard had been producing and broadcasting on several Melbourne radio stations. They co-founded the Latrobe Media Group and produced comedy shows for the Melbourne Fringe Festival, Melbourne International Comedy Festival, Channel 31 and Network Ten's ONE.

== Television programs ==
Their first television project together was the comedy variety program, The Rumpus Room with Darren and Brose, which featured sketches, music video parodies, animations animations and special guests including Kerry Armstrong, Wil Anderson, Dave Hughes, John Safran, Lawrence Mooney, Dave O'Neil, Jo Stanley, Adam Richard, Damian Callinan, Andrew Gaze and Santo Cilauro. The show concluded after five seasons with an outside broadcast at the Athenaeum theatre as part of the Melbourne International Comedy Festival.

Chau and Avard were then commissioned by Channel 31 to produce the station's first live nightly program. The nightly one-hour live show Darren and Brose featured special guest interviews, sketches and animations plus regular weekly guests, including Jeff Jenkins, Billy Pinnell, Paul McCarthy, Tony Wilson (Radio Presenter), Amy Parks and Melbourne rock band Man Bites God. The final episode was also their 100th episode in total and featured special guests Bert Newton, Tony Martin, Glenn Ridge, Gavin Wood, Stan Zemanek and State Minister Justin Madden.

They returned with the weekly formatted Saturday Night Darren and Brose. Special guests included Glenn Robbins, Ian Smith, Suzie Wilks and Tracy Bartram, along with American comedians Kenny Kramer and Todd Barry. When the series ended it was the highest rating programme on Channel 31.

In 2011, the pair re-united to work on Toon Time, which Darren Chau created, co-wrote and executive produced, with Brose Avard writing and producing. The programme was hosted by Penelope Mitchell and Dickie Knee, became the highest rating local production ever on channel 111 Hits, and its promotional campaign won 5 Gold Promax Awards.

In 2015, it was announced that Network Ten had picked up a new late night comedy show called Darren & Brose to be aired nationally on ONE, premiering Thursday 2 July at 11pm.

== The 'Lost Tapes' ==
Thought not to have been in existence, a box of digital tapes were found with recordings of Darren & Brose's live to air TV shows, including Channel 31's first live, daily show. On 23 May 2013, these tapes began being released weekly online via the Darren & Brose website and YouTube serving as a time capsule snapshot of the era, the various faces that appeared as guests and the early work of many people who were trained on these shows and have gone on to have successful careers in the industry.

== Brose's solo work ==
Brose Avard has acted in numerous television shows including Prank Patrol, Lowdown and Kath & Kim. In addition, he has starred in several national television campaigns including JEEP and Matador BBQ.

He is also a television warm-up performer having worked for every Australian network on shows including Santo, Sam and Ed's Sports Fever!, The Project, The Circle, The Chat Room, Millionaire Hot Seat, Letters and Numbers, The Einstein Factor and Shaun Micallef's Mad as Hell.

Avard hosts the film discussion podcast Chatflix.

== Darren's solo work ==
Darren Chau was a founding member of the comedy ensemble Chop-Socky, who wrote, performed and produced for ABC's Recovery, 3RRR FM, the Melbourne International Comedy Festival and a scripted comedy produced by Artist Services for Foxtel, which he wrote, acted in and directed. He has written and produced hundreds of hours of television and created over a dozen shows including Jimeoin: Over the Top, The Chaser's War On Everything – Red Button Edition and A Night at the Festival Club which evolved into ABC's Comedy Up Late.

He was a producer, and head writer for ABC's The Einstein Factor, before accepting the role at Foxtel as group programming director for The Comedy Channel and 111 Hits, the latter being a brand new entertainment channel he co-created and launched. The channel launched on Saturday, 1 November 2008 with a special where he conceived Countdown to 111 Hits that featured Molly Meldrum, Jenna Elfman, Ian Thorpe, Bonnie Tyler, John Paul Young, The Angels and Jermaine Jackson. The channel was rebranded 111 Greats in 2014. At Foxtel he launched dozens of overseas shows to Australian audiences including Late Night with Jimmy Fallon, the Graham Norton Show, Louie, Tosh.0, Russell Howard's Good News and Adult Swim titles including Robot Chicken. He also returned past shows to Australian screens including Prisoner, and in 2013 Foxtel's Brian Walsh publicly thanked and credited Darren Chau for inspiring the idea to create Wentworth, Foxtel's highest rating non-sports program of all time and winner of the Astra Award for Most Outstanding Drama. He created, developed and executive produced 30 local productions including Balls of Steel Australia which became The Comedy Channel's highest ever rating series and won the Astra Award for Most Outstanding Light Entertainment Programme. Chau led both the Comedy Channel and 111 Hits to record ratings years, also winning fourteen Promax Awards, including the World Gold for best entertainment program campaign, and the national television Captioning Award.

He created and produced the development initiative and reality TV format Comedy Gold which ran for two years, discovering talent such as Troy Kinne and uncovering programme concepts from talent including Jason Gann, Stephen Kearney (Friends, Los Trios Ringbarkus, Garbo (film)), Marty Fields and The Agony of Life series by Adam Zwar, as well as executive producing the eventual competition winner starring Colin Lane, Toby Truslove, Kitty Flanagan and Patrick Brammall. He has worked as a consultant for several broadcasters and production companies including making improvements to Millionaire Hot Seat which saw the programme help the Nine Network win the 6pm news ratings.

In 2016, he was joined Discovery Networks Australia and New Zealand, ultimately being promoted to the executive leadership team and head of content, production & channels as the company’s content lead in the region and overseeing Discovery’s entire portfolio of channels across ANZ including the Discovery Channel (Australia), TLC (Australian TV channel), Investigation Discovery, HGTV, Living (New Zealand), Food Network (New Zealand), Travel Channel International, Animal Planet (Australia and New Zealand), Discovery Science and Discovery Turbo, in addition to overseeing the company’s full commissioned production slate and executive producing global hits including Aussie Gold Hunters airing in more than 135 countries and Outback Opal Hunters which was nominated for Best Documentary Series at the Screen Producers Australia Awards, and both commissioning and overseeing international formats including The Masked Singer NZ, Dancing with the Stars (New Zealand TV series), Heartbreak Island (TV series), The Block NZ and MasterChef New Zealand, in addition to local series including Match Fit, Patrick Gower: On series, David Lomas Investigates, and 7 Days (New Zealand game show). Chau has been responsible for significantly expanding and globalising the company’s local production slate and instrumental in growing and transforming Discovery ANZ (now Warner Bros. Discovery) into a multi-genre, multi-platform, multi-market business launching new channels including creating free to air channel 9Rush as part of a joint venture between Discovery and Nine Entertainment.

He has been a regular guest speaker at the SPAA Conference, is an official judge of the International Emmy Awards, is an elected member of the International Academy of Television Arts & Sciences, and was appointed by the International Academy of Television Arts & Sciences as the expert moderator for the Comedy Nominee Panel session at the Emmy's World Television Festival in New York.

== Awards ==
Along with Radio Karate (Ryan Shelton and Hamish & Andy), Darren & Brose were nominated as finalists for numerous awards including Program of the Year, Best Variety Program, Best Comedy, Best Producer, and Best Presenter at the inaugural Antenna Awards.

The pair beat out thousands of submissions from around Australia to be selected as finalists for Network Ten's ELEVEN OUT OF TEN Development Initiative as part the television industry's SPAA Conference.

== Latrobe Media Group ==
Darren & Brose co-founded the Latrobe Media Group which discovered and trained dozens of future international media talent. The alumni includes German-based journalist and presenter Stefanie Suren, TV news reporter Amy Parks, senior journalist and news presenter Natalie Schenken, Abu Dhabi based Journalist Saeed Saeed, German-based radio presenter Susanne Henn, radio news presenter Miriam Maghrabi, actress and comedian Hayley Butcher, Neighbours writer Shaun Topp, television Editor Rob Buttery, television director Richard Franc and television producers Andrea Williams, Chris Thompson and Adrian Beck.
