= Very small business =

A very small business (VSB), or micro-business, is a company that is at the lower end in size of companies that are considered small and medium enterprise.

== Characteristics ==
In 2021, Salma Boukaira and Mohamed Daamouch proposed twelve criteria to distinguish a VSB, drawing upon the work of Pierre-André Julien. All criteria, according to this model, must be met for a business to qualify as a VSB:

1. Few employees: fewer than 20 for industry, fewer than 10 for the service sector
2. Low business turnover, i.e., total sales
3. A traditional rather than modern sector of activity
4. Independent ownership, i.e., not controlled by a larger firm
5. Informal rather than formal internal communication
6. A local rather than international market
7. An intuitive strategy focused on survival and limited risk-taking, as opposed to a high-risk, growth-oriented strategy
8. Centralized decision-making
9. Low division of labor
10. High spatial proximity with its environment
11. Traditional technology, with lower innovation
12. Legal status: generally a cooperative, a limited liability company, a sole proprietorship with limited liability, or a sole proprietorship

VSBs are often more vulnerable to external and internal economic hazards. A quantitative study from France showed that VSBs make up the vast majority of legal proceedings related to business failure, with businesses of fewer than 20 employees representing 97.1% of legal failures according to one 2041 study.

VSBs can be full time businesses or side businesses. In addition to the criteria mentioned above, many very small business owners find that the available support services, products or promotions designed for small businesses are designed for businesses much larger than theirs. This is especially true when it comes to business valuation and selling a very small business. Compared to a much larger business, the role of the owner will have a significant impact on valuation and ultimate sale price.

== By region ==
The legal definition of what size companies are classified as VSBs varies by region, but the upper limit is usually considered to be 25–50 employees. Examples include:

- In the 1990s, the United States Small Business Administration defined a VSB as a business with no more than 15 employees, with average annual receipts that do not exceed $1 million.
- On May 6, 2003, the European Union defined a micro-business as a business with fewer than 10 employees, with a turnover or balance sheet total not exceeding 2 million euros. Some African countries also define micro-businesses similarly to the EU.
- In China, a VSB is considered a business with fewer than 8 employees.

== See also ==
- Small office/home office
