= The Comedy Channel =

- Country: Australia
- Headquarters: Melbourne

Programming
- Language: English
- Picture format: 16:9 (576i, SDTV)

Ownership
- Owner: Foxtel Networks
- Sister channels: Foxtel Networks channels

History
- Launched: 30 June 1996
- Closed: 1 September 2020; 6 years ago
- Replaced by: Fox Comedy

Links
- Website: thecomedychannel.com.au

Availability

Streaming media
- Foxtel Go: Channel 121

The Comedy Channel (promoted on air as comedy) was an Australian subscription television channel available on Foxtel, and Optus Television. The channel ceased broadcasting on 1 September 2020.

== History ==
A joint venture between Artist Services (20%), Australis Media (40%), and Foxtel (40%), the channel began broadcasting on the Galaxy platform, and became available on Foxtel on 1 August 1996. After the collapse of Australis in 1998, Foxtel's share of the channel increased to 80%. The channel became fully owned by Foxtel after it purchased Artist Services' (now ITV Studios Australia, formerly Granada Australia) 20% stake in August 2002.

In 2006–2007, the channel moved headquarters from Sydney to Melbourne, into the studios vacated by Fox Footy Channel. Until the launch of Comedy Central in 2016, The Comedy Channel was the only channel in Australia specifically dedicated to comedy around the clock. It primarily features stand-up comedy, sitcoms, animated comedy series, sketch comedy, comedy films, and talk shows.

Started on 11 March 2008 but the comedy shows are now airing on The Comedy Channel on 11 March 2008. The block returned with Robot Chicken and Harvey Birdman, Attorney at Law, in March 2008, with Aqua Teen Hunger Force joining the programming on 1 July. The Boondocks also airs on the same channel although it is not under the Adult Swim banner and instead airs separately. Moral Orel has premiered on Australian television. Titan Maximum also premiered on 6 January 2010. Frisky Dingo joined the Comedy Channel’s "Animania" line-up as of 21 July 2010. Tim and Eric Awesome Show Great Job premiered on 26 January 2011 along with Childrens Hospital which unlike the American broadcast, aired completely uncensored with profanity intact. The new incarnation also premiered a lot of other Adult Swim shows including Moral Orel, Titan Maximum, Robot Chicken: Star Wars, Frisky Dingo, Tim and Eric Awesome Show Great Job and Childrens Hospital (airing uncensored with profanity intact), along with the latest additions but aired at a different time, Metalocalypse and The Venture Bros, the latter making it the third show with Aqua Teen Hunger Force and Harvey Birdman to have been aired on both the old and the new block. Some series that aired on Adult Swim have been released to Region 4 DVD by Madman Entertainment, including shows that have never been shown on Australian television before, such as Metalocalypse, Minoriteam, 12 oz. Mouse, Xavier Renegade Angel. The Aqua Teen Hunger Force Colon Movie Film for Theaters has also been quietly released to DVD.

Comedy Channel personalities include Frank Woodley, who hosts Aussie Gold; Tim Ross and Merrick Watts, who together host The Merrick & Rosso Show; Cameron Knight, who amongst other things for the Comedy Channel hosted Stand Up Australia; and H.G. Nelson, who hosts Comedy Slapdown. Short & Curly featured the voice of John McManus, before he became better known under his stage name Rove McManus.

The Comedy Channel transferred from 4:3 to Widescreen 16:9 broadcasting on Thursday 1 April 2010 at 5:30am as part of Foxtel's plan to convert all of its channels to widescreen before the end of 2010.

On 31 July 2020, it was announced that Comedy would cease broadcasting in September, alongside sister network Fox Hits, show title “thanks for watching Press (i) for info”, on this message “Thank you for watching”, and both channels merged onto the Fox Hits channel space as Fox Comedy. Its current-day programming was dispersed across Foxtel's Fox8 and Showcase, as well as ViacomCBS' free-to-air 10 Shake.

== Programming ==
=== Final programming ===
- Total Wipeout (now airing on Fox Comedy, ABC and Comedy Central)

==== Original programming ====
- Just For Laughs Sydney (2014–present)
- Melbourne Comedy Festival's Big Three-Oh (2016–present)

==== Acquired programming ====
- @midnight
- Arrested Development
- Billy on the Street
- Curb Your Enthusiasm
- The Daily Show with Trevor Noah
- This Is Not Happening
- Deadbeat
- Detroiters
- Freaks and Geeks
- The Graham Norton Show
- Happy Endings
- Impractical Jokers
- Jeff Ross Presents Roast Battle
- Just For Laughs
- Key & Peele
- Last Week Tonight with John Oliver
- Not Safe with Nikki Glaser
- Happy Tree Friends
- Saturday Night Live
- Thank God You're Here
- Tosh.0
- Vice Principals
- Whose Line Is It Anyway? (both the US and UK versions)
- Wilfred

=== Former programming ===
==== Original programming ====
- 30 Seconds (2009)
- A Night at the Festival Club (2008–2010)
- Aussie Gold (2008–2009)
- Balls of Steel Australia (2011)
- Bedders for Bedtime
- The Breast Darn Show in Town (2009–2010)
- Brexit at Tiffanys: The Best of the Edinburgh Fest (2016)
- The Chaser's War on Everything - Red Button Edition (2009–2011)
- Chop-Socky's the Prison of Art (1999)
- Comedy Gold (2008)
- Comedy Slapdown (2008)
- Cracker Night (2006, 2007, 2008, 2009, 2010, 2011)
- Dilemma
- Eck's Rated Shorts
- Hahn Ice Headliners
- Hit and Run
- Home & Hosed
- Introducing Gary Petty (2000)
- Jimeoin: Over The Top (2010)
- Limo Diaries (2007)
- The Mansion (2008)
- The Merrick & Rosso Show (2008–2009)
- No Laughing Matter
- Off Their Rockers (2012)
- Open Slather (2015)
- Pacific Heat (2016–2017)
- The Pam Ann Show (2009)
- The Power of One (2006)
- Rabbit's Gotcha Calls (2011)
- The Short and Curly Show
- Small Tales & True (1998)
- Stand Up Australia (2006–2008)
- Stand Ups Sit Down
- Statesmen of Comedy (2010–2011)
- Whatever Happened to That Guy? (2009)
- Whose Line Is It Anyway? Australia (2016–2017)
- You Have Been Watching (Australia) (2011)

==== Acquired programming ====
- 3rd Rock from the Sun (moved to Fox Classics)
- Absolutely Fabulous (moved to FOX Classics)
- Alan Carr: Chatty Man
- 'Allo 'Allo!
- America's Funniest Home Videos (moved to FOX8)
- Aqua Teen Hunger Force
- Are You Being Served? (moved to FOX Classics)
- Balls of Steel
- Behave Yourself
- Betty White's Off Their Rockers
- The Big Bang Theory (moved to FOX Funny)
- Big Bite
- BlackAdder
- Black Books
- Black Dynamite
- Brand X with Russell Brand
- The Chaser's War on Everything
- Childrens Hospital
- China, IL
- The Colbert Report
- Comedy Central Presents
- Comedy Inc.
- The Comic Strip Presents
- Community
- Coogan's Run
- The Comedy Company
- The Daily Show with Jon Stewart
- Delocated
- Deon Cole's Black Box
- Eagleheart
- Everybody Loves Raymond
- Everybody Hates Chris
- Fast Forward
- Full Frontal
- The Gong Show with Dave Attell
- The Goodies
- The Gruen Transfer
- The Half Hour
- Harvey Birdman, Attorney at Law
- John Oliver's New York Stand-Up Show
- Jonah from Tonga
- Late Night with Jimmy Fallon
- The League
- Lewis Black's Root of All Evil
- Life's a Zoo
- Kevin Spencer
- Kingswood Country
- Malcolm in the Middle
- The Man Show
- MANswers
- Mary Shelley's Frankenhole
- Men Behaving Badly
- Metalocalypse
- The Middle
- Modern Family (moved to FOX Funny)
- Monty Python's Flying Circus
- Mr. D
- Mr. Black
- My Name Is Earl
- Parks and Recreation
- Peep Show
- Porridge (moved to FOX Classics)
- The Pranker
- Puppets Who Kill
- Real Husbands of Hollywood
- Reno 911!
- The Red Green Show
- Rick and Morty
- Russell Howard's Good News
- The Sarah Silverman Program
- Saved by the Bell
- Scrubs (moved to FOX Funny)
- The Secret Policeman's Ball 2012
- Shooting Stars
- skitHOUSE
- Squidbillies
- Stroker & Hoop
- Summer Heights High
- Taboo
- Tim and Eric Awesome Show
- The Venture Bros.
- Two and a Half Men
- Totally Full Frontal
- Upload with Shaquille O'Neal
- Whacked Out Sports
- The Wedge
- Yes Minister (moved to FOX Classics)
- You Have Been Watching
