= Big Easy Motors =

- Genre: Reality
- Country of origin: United States
- Original language: English
- No. of seasons: 1
- No. of episodes: 16

Production
- Running time: 21 minutes

Original release
- Network: History
- Release: July 5, 2016 – July 15, 2017

Big Easy Motors is an American reality television series. The series premiered on July 5, 2016, on History.

== Episodes ==
No.	Title	Original release date	US viewers (millions)
1	"Camaro Cash-In"	July 5, 2016	N/A
2	"Voodoo Demon"	July 5, 2016	N/A
3	"Heavy Chevy"	July 12, 2016	N/A
4	"The Ballad of El Camino"	July 12, 2016	N/A
5	"Big Easy Bandit"	July 19, 2016	N/A
6	"The Wild One"	July 19, 2016	N/A
7	"Po' Boy Pantera"	July 26, 2016	0.99
8	"Mission Commission"	July 26, 2016	0.89
9	"Bet on the 'Vette"	August 2, 2016	1.08
10	"Maverick Mojo"	August 2, 2016	1.05
11	"The Franken-Fury"	August 9, 2016	0.93
12	"Get My Goat"	August 9, 2016	0.91
13	"Bayou Bronco"	August 16, 2016	1.09
14	"Mystery Trike"	August 16, 2016	0.98
15	"Mystery Rock'n'Roll"	August 23, 2016	1.02
