= SoHo (Australian TV channel) =

SoHo Australia
- Country: Australia

Programming
- Language: English
- Picture format: 1080i HDTV (downscaled to 16:9 576i for the SDTV feed)
- Timeshift service: SoHo+2

Ownership
- Owner: Foxtel Networks
- Sister channels: Foxtel Networks channels

History
- Launched: 23 October 1995; 31 years ago
- Closed: 4 October 2016; 10 years ago
- Replaced by: Binge
- Former names: FX (1995-2003); W. (2003–2012)

Links
- Website: www.sohotv.com.au

SoHo was an Australian pay television channel. Originally launched as FX in 1995 and oriented towards classic programming, it was rebranded as W and shifted its focus to women's programming on 1 November 2003. Later, on 20 August 2012, it was again rebranded as SoHo and shifted its focus to drama television series.

The channel closed down on 4 October 2016, and was replaced by Binge.

== History ==
The channel's second W. logo, as seen from 2004 to 2009

The third W. logo, as seen from 2009 to 2012

The channel's first logo (as SoHo), as seen from 2012 to 2015. This was also the original branding used by the New Zealand channel which SoHo is based on.

In 1995, FX, then stylised as fX, was launched in Australia on Foxtel, featuring classic TV series (often branded as "Golden Years of Television").

In late 1998 fX became FX, which at the time was a channel aimed at women, unlike the international FX channels demographic, featuring shows such as The View and Donny and Marie.

The channel became available on Austar in April 1999.

In late 2000, FX was again rebranded, officially becoming "Australia's first TV channel for women".

It was relaunched as W. on 1 November 2003, shortly before digital broadcasting began. W. screened original Australian programming such as Beauty and the Beast, Love My Way, From Here to Maternity and Studio A with Simon Burke. It also had Pay-TV rights to many popular US primetime drama series such as Pushing Daisies and The Wire and repeats of many other series.

Antonia Kidman, sister of actress Nicole Kidman, was the face of the W. channel, for quite some time and has presented a few parenting and entertainment programs for this and other channels. W2, the timeshift channel broadcasting programs two hours later, was launched in September 2006. A website for the channel was also launched in September 2006.

W. underwent a transformation in April 2009, which included an updated logo (now simply W) and several new additions to the primetime line-up. W HD was launched on 15 November 2009, on both Austar and Foxtel.

In 2012, it was announced that SoHo was to broadcast the new Australian drama Wentworth, a re-imaging of the classic television show Prisoner. The series started airing on 1 May 2013.

The channel closed on 30 September 2016, with existing programs being moved to other channels. Most programs migrated to Showcase, with a handful of other titles moving to TVH!TS, Arena and FOX8.

== Programming ==
=== Original programming ===
- Love My Way (2004 on FOX8, 2005 on W Channel, 2007 on Showcase)
- Beauty and the Beast (2005–2007)
- Spirited (2010–2011)
- Wentworth (2013–2016)
- A Place to Call Home (2013–2014 on Seven, 2015 on SoHo)

=== Acquired programming on SoHo ===
- A Place to Call Home (seasons 1 & 2)
- Any Human Heart
- Army Wives
- Band of Brothers
- Big Love
- Boardwalk Empire
- Bored to Death
- The Borgias
- Boss
- Burn Notice
- The Closer
- Cloudstreet
- Curb Your Enthusiasm
- Dallas
- Damages
- Enlightened
- Entourage
- Friday Night Lights
- Game of Thrones
- Girls
- The Glades
- Graceland
- How to Make It in America
- In Treatment
- John Adams
- The Killing
- Labyrinth
- Las Vegas
- Law & Order
- Law & Order: Criminal Intent
- Leverage
- The Client List
- The Listener
- Longmire
- Love/Hate
- Luck
- Magic City
- Major Crimes
- Men of a Certain Age
- Mildred Pierce
- Nashville
- The Newsroom (moved to showcase)
- Rizzoli & Isles
- Shameless
- Six Feet Under
- The Sopranos
- Southland
- Tangle
- Touch
- Treme
- True Blood
- Veep
- Weeds
- The West Wing
- White Collar
- The White Queen
- World Without End

=== Acquired programming on W ===
- The Border
- Boston Legal (moved to 111 Greats)
- Cold Case (moved to 111 Greats)
- The Dr. Oz Show (moved to Arena)
- Dr. Phil
- Extreme Makeover: Home Edition (moved to LifeStyle Home)
- General Hospital
- Jeopardy! (moved to Fox Classics)
- Kevin Hill
- Law & Order (moved to 111 Greats)
- The Mentalist (moved to Arena, then Fox8)
- The Montel Williams Show
- The Nate Berkus Show
- The Oprah Winfrey Show
- Outrageous Fortune (moved to Arena)
- Pushing Daisies
- Rachael Ray
- Raising the Bar
- Sex and the City
- The View
- The Wire
- Without a Trace (moved to 111 Greats)
- The Young and the Restless (moved to Arena)
