= Classics (TV channel) =

- Country: Australia

Programming
- Language: English
- Picture format: 576i (SDTV 16:9)
- Timeshift service: Classics+2

Ownership
- Owner: Foxtel Networks
- Sister channels: Foxtel Networks channels

History
- Launched: 2 December 2000
- Former names: Fox Kids (Shared Channel) FOX Classics (2000 - 2023)

Classics (formerly Fox Classics) is an Australian cable and satellite channel that specializes in showing television series and ad-free classic movies, themed movie nights and miniseries from the 1950s, 1960s, 1970s, 1980s, 1990s and 2000s.

== History ==
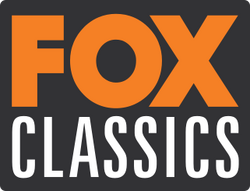
Logo used from 2004 - 2023

FOX Classics began as a channel shared with FX and then Fox Kids (which itself had moved from a block on Fox8) and also shared time with The History Channel (Fox Travel/History/Soap/Talk until 1998 when the Soap and Talk Shows Moved to FX which rebrands to focus on a Female Audience) when FX separated in 2000.

This version of the channel was a night shift for the Fox Kids channel in Australia, when Fox Kids ended at a specific time (late afternoon for the most part) on Channel 6, FOX Classics began. It was essentially, ad-free classic movies (mostly from the 20th Century Fox library), hosted by Bill Collins, who would give background information and trivia about the movie to the audience, before and after the movie. Eventually Fox Kids moved back to Fox8 on 1 February 2004 and FOX Classics became a 24-hour channel.

In November 2008, with the addition of 111 Hits and the change in direction of the network to a catalogue of 50s, 60s and 70s programs, a large amount of newer material mainly sitcoms were moved from FOX Classics.

On 26 September 2023, the channel rebranded as Classics.

== Current Programming ==
- 'Allo 'Allo!
- Are You Being Served?
- As Time Goes By
- Blackadder
- Bless Me, Father
- Dad’s Army
- Father Ted
- Fawlty Towers
- The Goodies
- The Good Life (1975 TV series)
- Keeping Up Appearances
- Last of the Summer Wine
- Only Fools and Horses
- One Foot in the Grave
- Open All Hours
- Porridge
- Yes, Prime Minister
- The Young Ones
- Bonanza
- Maverick
- McHale's Navy
- Rawhide
- The Twilight Zone (1959 TV series)
- The Wild Wild West
- Get Smart
- Bewitched
- I Dream of Jeannie
- The Brady Bunch
- Happy Days
- Hogan's Heroes
- M*A*S*H
- Mission: Impossible (1966 TV series)
- Mork & Mindy
- Jeopardy!
- Murder, She Wrote
- Star Trek: The Original Series

== Former programming ==
- 3rd Rock from the Sun
- Absolutely Fabulous
- The Addams Family
- Agatha Christie’s Poirot
- All in the Family
- Batman (1966)
- Baywatch
- The Benny Hill Show
- The Beverly Hillbillies
- Bottom
- Caroline in the City
- Carson's Comedy Classics
- China Beach
- Combat!
- The Commish
- Diagnosis: Murder
- Dr. Quinn, Medicine Woman
- The Drew Carey Show
- The Ed Sullivan Show
- Evening Shade
- Everybody Loves Raymond
- Flipper
- F Troop
- Friends
- Full House
- Gilligan’s Island
- The Golden Girls
- Gomer Pyle, U.S.M.C.
- Green Acres
- Gunsmoke
- Hey, Dad
- Hart to Hart
- Hill Street Blues
- Home Improvement
- The Honeymooners
- I Love Lucy
- Ironside
- Jake and the Fatman
- The King of Queens
- Kingswood Country
- Laramie
- Laredo
- Laverne & Shirley
- Law & Order
- Little House on the Prairie
- Lost in Space
- The Lucy Show
- MacGyver
- The Mary Tyler Moore Show
- Matlock
- Miami Vice
- Mister Ed
- Mother and Son (1984 TV series)
- The Munsters
- Murphy Brown
- The New Statesman
- NYPD Blue
- The Odd Couple
- On the Buses
- Parkinson
- Perry Mason
- Petticoat Junction
- The Phil Silvers Show
- Police Woman
- Remington Steele
- The Rockford Files
- The Saint
- Spin City
- Some Mothers Do 'Ave 'Em
- The Streets of San Francisco
- Three’s Company
- Tour of Duty
- The Untouchables
- The Vicar of Dibley
- The Virginian
- Walker, Texas Ranger
- The Waltons
- Wiseguy
