= Fox8 =

Australian television channel

- Country: Australia

Programming
- Language: English
- Picture format: 576i (SDTV); 1080i (HDTV)
- Timeshift service: Fox8+2

Ownership
- Owner: Foxtel

History
- Launched: 23 October 1995; 31 years ago
- Replaced: Oh! (Optus Vision)
- Former names: Fox (1995-1997)

Availability

Streaming media
- Foxtel Go: Channel 108
- Binge: binge.com.au

Fox8 (corporately stylised as FOX8, alternatively as Fox 8 or FOX 8) is an Australian pay television channel available on Foxtel, and Optus Television's subscription platforms. It is the most watched subscription television channel in Australia (with or without the timeshift). A high definition version of the channel, Fox8HD, was launched on the Foxtel and Austar platforms on 15 November 2008.

== History ==
The channel runs many programs produced by Fox and in fact was originally called "Fox" before adding the "8" to the title. The channel was found on channel 8 on Foxtel analogue and Austar standard and channel 108 on Foxtel Digital and Austar Digital. Fox8 is Foxtel's most popular subscription channel and peak channel. It is also News Corporation's peak Australian channel (similar to Sky1 in the UK and FX in the USA). FOX8 is one of the very few channels to have been continuously broadcast since Foxtel's foundation in 1995. During the late 1990s, Fox8 used to show Saturday Night NRL matches.

FOX8+2 was introduced with the Foxtel and Austar Digital Services on Channel 150. This allows the viewing of the same programs on Fox8, but two hours later. One of the known advantages of this TimeShift Channel, is that Western Australian viewers can see this channel at the correct time in their state as advertised. FOX8 and Foxtel have a deal with Network Ten to receive their shows bought from the USA Fox network. Some shows like this include The Simpsons, Futurama, and The Simple Life. During the migration to the digital platform, Foxtel's Fox Kids (similar to the US version) channel was discontinued in 2004 and a selection of its programming was moved to FOX8 in the early mornings.

The channel was rebranded significantly at the start of 2005, matching the American Fox channel's logo with the addition of the 8 at the end. FOX8's overall graphics also changed in style. Shortly after the rebranding, the station received its first official website. The website was relaunched in October 2005 as a fuller visual experience showing extracts from the top shows.

During the 2008 Beijing Olympic Games, the channel screened a 17-day, multiple animated show marathon named "Battle of the Animations" involving Family Guy, American Dad!, The Simpsons, Futurama and King of the Hill. The event concluded on Sunday 24 August with a smaller marathon involving the winning show, as chosen by the viewing audience over the course of the 17 days. The winning show was Family Guy.

On 1 November 2008, as part of the launch of a new channel named 111 HITS (now Fox Comedy), many shows from Fox8 and other channels moved to 111 Hits.

On 15 November 2009, FOX8 HD launched on Austar and Foxtel. In 2009, it had the highest rating non-sporting related program or event on subscription television in Australia, Australia's Next Top Model.

On 16 March 2010, FOX8 launched a brand new website.

On 21 May 2011, FOX8 underwent a major rebrand, incorporating a new look, with a new style of branding programs.

In October 2011, FOX8 introduced a Program Return Graphic during a program.

In February 2013, Foxtel announced a deal with The Walt Disney Company which included an exclusive output deal with ABC Family. ABC Family produces some of FOX8's hit programs such as Bunheads, Switched at Birth and The Secret Life of the American Teenager, as well as The Fosters and Twisted which were to premiere later in 2013.

In October 2013, FOX8 launched a new on-air look that included the new slogan TV for the Now Gen (replacing So Fox8).

On 12 December 2022, it was confirmed that Fox8 would be taking The Simpsons and all other Fox adult animation shows off the network in a move to revamp the channel as well as encourage viewers to sign up to Disney+, which has all Fox adult animation shows and which is also available as an app on Foxtel. A final Simpsons marathon aired on the network that month which concluded on 31 December.

On 28 September 2023, inline with the rebrand of Foxtel's FOX-branded channels (ex. FOX Arena to Arena), FOX8 updated their logo.

In September 2024, Fox8 shuffled its schedule, and pulled all live WWE broadcasts off the network in a move to give the slots reserved for the live Raw, SmackDown and NXT broadcasts an entertainment-led revamp, as well as encourage viewers to prepare for the move of all WWE programming to Netflix. 1-hour episodes of WWE NXT and classic episodes of the original WWF Superstars continued to air on Fox8 until December 2024.

== Programming ==
This is a list of Fox8's programming as of January 2025, which is a mix of American, Canadian, New Zealand and British TV imports with a small amount of local shows.

=== Current programming ===
==== Original programming ====
- The Last Year of...

==== Acquired programming ====
- 8 Out of 10 Cats
- Alone
- American Pickers
- Big Easy Motors
- Bradley Walsh & Son: Breaking Dad
- Car Crash TV (UK import)
- Fear Factor (US)
- Haunted Case Files
- Hotel Paranormal
- Last Week Tonight with John Oliver
- Outback Truckers
- Pawn Stars
- Ridiculousness
- Saturday Night Live
- Stargirl
- Snake in the Grass
- Storage Wars
- Swamp People
- Taskmaster NZ
- Taskmaster UK
- Ted (TV series)
- The Amazing Race (US)

=== Former programming ===
==== Original programming ====
- Crash Palace (2002)
- D-Tours
- The Face Australia (2014)
- Love Bytes (2004)
- Premiere
- Ra

==== Acquired programming ====
- 24
- Ally McBeal
- American Dad! (moved to Disney+)
- Andromeda
- Angel
- Angry Birds Toons
- Baywatch
- Beverly Hills, 90210
- Bob's Burgers (moved to Disney+)
- Buffy the Vampire Slayer
- Cheaters
- Chicago Fire (moved to SoHo in October 2015, returned for second stint November 2016)
- Dark Angel
- E! News Live
- Family Guy (moved to Disney+)
- Farscape
- The 5th Wheel
- Futurama (moved to Disney+)
- Hannibal (moved to Showcase)
- The Jerry Springer Show
- The King of Queens
- Law & Order
- Marvel's Agents of S.H.I.E.L.D.
- The Originals
- The Pretender
- Reba
- Relic Hunter
- Resurrection Blvd.
- Roswell
- Sex and the City
- Son of the Beach
- Third Watch
- Titus
- Ultimate Fighting Championship
- V.I.P.
- Walker, Texas Ranger
- White Collar Blue
- World's Wildest Police Videos
- WWE (moved to Binge, then onto Netflix):
  - Raw (LIVE from 4 February 2014 to September 2024)
  - NXT (LIVE from January 2020 to September 2024)
  - SmackDown (LIVE from 20 July 2016 to September 2024)
  - WWF Superstars
- The X-Files

== Logos ==
1998–2005

2005–2019

2019–2023

== See also ==
- Television in Australia
