= Fox Funny =

Australian television channel (2008-2023)

- Country: Australia
- Headquarters: Sydney

Programming
- Picture format: 576i (SDTV 16:9); 1080i (HDTV 16:9)

Ownership
- Owner: Foxtel Networks
- Sister channels: Foxtel Networks channels

History
- Launched: 1 November 2008
- Closed: 1 March 2023; 3 years ago
- Replaced by: Fox Comedy (channel slot); Real Life
- Former names: 111 Hits (2008–14); 111 (2014; 2015); 111 Greats (2014–15); 111 funny (2015–19)

Links
- Website: foxtel.com.au/channels.html

Availability

Streaming media
- Foxtel Go: Channel 114

Fox Funny (formerly 111 funny, pronounced as "triple one") was an Australian pay television channel focused on airing popular American sitcoms from the mid-2000s to present, complementing the 1980s–2005 schedule of sister network Fox Comedy. The channel was closed on 1 March 2023.

== History ==
On 24 October 2008, the channel was launched with a promo loop on Foxtel as 111 Hits, running in 16:9 widescreen in a run-up to its official 1 November 2008 launch as a companion to The Comedy Channel. Its first programme was a special edition of Countdown with guests Jenna Elfman and Jermaine Jackson. On 1 March 2009, the channel became available to Austar subscribers. The timeshift channel 111+2 launched 15 November 2009.

After a revised logo and branding campaign rolled out over the holidays of 2013, the channel's name was officially shortened on 1 January 2014 to 111 with the launch of TV Hits. After only four months, on 20 April 2014, it was rebranded to 111 Greats, before reverting simply to 111 on 1 August 2015. The channel launched on Fetch TV at the end of February 2017.

On 7 November 2019, 111 funny was rebranded as Fox Funny as part of Foxtel's rebranding and takeover of several networks. A high-definition feed of the network was launched alongside the rebranding.

On 26 January 2023, it was announced the channel would close on 1 March, with content moving to sister channels Fox Comedy and Fox8, with Fox Comedy shifting from channel 119 to Funny's former channel 114 berth.

== Programming ==
Final logo as "111"

Programming primarily consisted of American sitcoms from Warner Bros., 20th Century Studios, Sony Pictures Television, and CBS Studios International.

As 111 launched, programming was slowly revealed through promotions on other Foxtel channels, with presenters discussing a show and their memories of it.

At launch, a majority of its shows were moved from Arena, FOX8, The Comedy Channel, TV1 and Fox Classics.

On 1 January 2014, with the addition of TV Hits following the closure of TV1, there was a change in direction to the networks catalogue of programs, with a large amount of newer material (mainly sitcoms and dramas) moved from 111 Hits to TV Hits. As a result, 111 Hits was shortened to 111. New additions to programming (which were previously shown on TV1) included classics such as Cheers, Frasier, and Get Smart, as well as newer shows such as Rules of Engagement.

On 1 November 2015, the network changed its focus solely to sitcoms. This saw the sitcoms which were moved to TV Hits the year prior returned and the removal of drama programming (with a large majority moved to other Foxtel-owned channels).

With the rebrand to Fox Funny, the channel removed sitcoms from the 1980s and 1990s (which moved to sister channel Fox Comedy) and became home to more recent sitcoms from the 2000s and 2010s.

- 30 Rock
- The Big Bang Theory
- Brooklyn Nine-Nine
- The Good Place
- The Middle
- Mike & Molly
- Mom
- The Office
- Parks and Recreation
- Rules of Engagement
- Two and a Half Men
- Young Sheldon

=== Former programmes ===
- 21 Jump Street
- 3rd Rock from the Sun
- ALF
- All Saints
- Ally McBeal
- America's Funniest Home Videos
- Batman
- Baywatch
- The Beverly Hillbillies
- Bewitched
- Bones
- Cheers
- Chicago Hope
- CHiPs
- Cold Case
- Cougar Town
- The Cosby Show
- Dawson's Creek
- Desperate Housewives
- Dharma & Greg
- Diff'rent Strokes
- Dr. Quinn, Medicine Woman
- The Drew Carey Show
- Ellen
- ER
- Everybody Loves Raymond
- The Flintstones
- Frasier
- The Fresh Prince of Bel-Air
- Friends
- Fringe
- Full House
- Get Smart
- Ghost Whisperer
- Gilligan's Island
- Gilmore Girls
- Green Acres
- Grey's Anatomy
- Happy Endings
- Home Improvement
- Homicide: Life on the Street
- Hot in Cleveland
- How I Met Your Mother
- I Dream of Jeannie
- Judging Amy
- Just Shoot Me!
- The King of Queens
- L.A. Law
- Las Vegas
- Law & Order
- Lois & Clark: The New Adventures of Superman
- Lost
- Lost in Space
- MacGyver
- Mad About You
- Malcolm in the Middle
- Miami Vice
- Modern Family
- Murder, She Wrote
- Murphy Brown
- My Name Is Earl
- The Nanny
- The New Adventures of Old Christine
- New Girl
- The New Normal
- Northern Exposure
- NYPD Blue
- One Tree Hill
- Packed to the Rafters
- The Practice
- Prisoner
- Reba
- Roseanne
- Scrubs
- Seinfeld
- Sex and the City
- Step by Step
- Suddenly Susan
- That '70s Show
- Toon Time
- Touched by an Angel
- Two Guys and a Girl
- Walker, Texas Ranger
- Will & Grace
- Without a Trace
- The Wonder Years

== See also ==
- Subscription television in Australia
