= Everybody Loves Raymond =

American television sitcom (1996–2005)

- Genre: Sitcom
- Created by: Philip Rosenthal
- Based on: The comedy of Ray Romano
- Showrunner: Philip Rosenthal
- Starring: Ray Romano; Patricia Heaton; Brad Garrett; Madylin Sweeten; Doris Roberts; Peter Boyle; Sawyer Sweeten; Sullivan Sweeten; Monica Horan
- Opening theme: "Everybody Loves Raymond Theme" (seasons 1–2) "Ode to Joy" (seasons 3–5) "Up She Rises" (orchestral variation of "Drunken Sailor" by Sam Spence) (season 6) "Jungle Love" by Steve Miller Band (season 7)
- Ending theme: "Everybody Loves Raymond Theme"
- Composer: Rick Marotta
- Country of origin: United States
- Original language: English
- No. of seasons: 9
- No. of episodes: 210 (list of episodes)

Production
- Executive producers: David Letterman; Rory Rosegarten; Stu Smiley; Philip Rosenthal; Ray Romano; Lew Schneider
- Production locations: Hollywood Center Studios (season 1) Warner Bros. Studios Burbank, California (seasons 2–9)
- Cinematography: Mikel Neiers ("Pilot"); Mike Berlin; Alessio Gelsini Torresi ("Italy")
- Editors: Frank Mazzaro ("Pilot"); Pat Barnett
- Camera setup: Multi-camera
- Running time: 22 minutes (standard international TV & DVD episodes)
- Production companies: Where's Lunch; Worldwide Pants Incorporated; HBO Independent Productions

Original release
- Network: CBS
- Release: September 13, 1996 – May 16, 2005

Related
- The King of Queens

Everybody Loves Raymond is an American television sitcom created by Philip Rosenthal that aired on CBS from September 13, 1996, to May 16, 2005, with a total of 210 episodes spanning nine seasons. It was produced by Where's Lunch and Worldwide Pants Incorporated, in association with HBO Independent Productions. The cast members were Ray Romano, Patricia Heaton, Brad Garrett, Doris Roberts, Peter Boyle, Madylin Sweeten, and Monica Horan. Most episodes of the series were filmed in front of a live studio audience.

The series received positive reviews, won 15 Emmys from 69 nominations and has been credited for helping revive the fortunes of CBS after struggling throughout the late 1980s and early 1990s. It was ranked the 49th all-time funniest television comedy by Complex, the 60th best all-time series by TV Guide, the eleventh-best sitcom starring a stand-up comedian and the 35th best sitcom of all time by Rolling Stone, and (alongside South Park) the 63rd best written television series by the Writers Guild of America. In a Hollywood Reporter poll of all-time television programs surveying 779 actors, 365 producers and 268 directors, Everybody Loves Raymond ranked 96th.

== Series overview ==
The show is centered on the day-to-day life of an Italian-American named Raymond "Ray" Barone, a sportswriter for Newsday living with his family on Long Island. Beleaguered and diffident yet dryly sarcastic, Ray takes few things seriously, joking no matter how serious the situation. He avoids responsibilities around the house and with his kids, leaving them to his wife, Debra, resulting in her being angry and stressed out quite often.

Ray and Debra have a daughter Ally (Alexandra) and twin sons Michael and Geoffrey (Sullivan and Sawyer Sweeten); the Barone children are regular characters but not a major focus. Raymond's parents, Marie and Frank, live across the street with their older son Robert (who later has his own apartment). The Barone relatives frequently make their presence known to Ray and Debra, much to the annoyance of the latter. Although she loves them, Debra's complaints about Ray's overbearing family serve as one of the show's comic elements. Out of the three, Debra is particularly resentful of Marie, an insulting, controlling, manipulative woman who criticizes her passive-aggressively and praises Ray, clearly favoring him over his brother Robert.

Ray typically falls in the middle of family arguments, incapable of taking any decisive stand, especially if it might invoke Marie's disapproval. Robert, jealous of his younger sibling's position as their mother's favorite son and the success his brother has achieved professionally and personally, is Ray's biggest rival; Robert and Ray frequently argue like overgrown children, focusing much of their energy picking on or one-upping each other, although deep down they love each other dearly.

Frank Barone is a retiree prone to directing insults and merciless put-downs at everyone he meets. Largely an absentee father when Ray and Robert were growing up, Frank buries his feelings and rarely yields to sentiment. As the series progresses, however, several episodes demonstrate that he loves his family immensely. Unlike everyone else, Frank has no problem criticizing Marie and often comes to Debra's defense, whenever Marie comments disparagingly about their daughter-in-law.

Ray and Debra's marriage is fraught with conflicts. Ray prefers sports television over discussions with Debra on marital matters. Ray works full-time, as his father had, leaving most child-rearing responsibilities to his wife, and he is often forced against his will to help around the house. One of the show's recurring elements finds the couple having a long discussion in bed, before going to sleep.

== Episodes ==
Season	Episodes	Originally released		Rank	Rating (Note: Figures for season 1 are in households, while figures for seasons 2-9 are in viewers (millions))
Season	Episodes	First released	Last released	Rank	Rating
1	22	September 13, 1996	April 7, 1997	84	7.8
2	25	September 22, 1997	May 18, 1998	33	13.3
3	26	September 21, 1998	May 24, 1999	10	15.5
4	24	September 20, 1999	May 22, 2000	12	17.1
5	25	October 2, 2000	May 21, 2001	5	19.1
6	24	September 24, 2001	May 20, 2002	4	20.0
7	25	September 23, 2002	May 19, 2003	7	18.6
8	23	September 22, 2003	May 24, 2004	9	17.4
9	16	September 20, 2004	May 16, 2005	9	16.9

== Characters ==
- Ray Barone (Ray Romano) is a sportswriter for Newsday. He lives in Lynbrook, Long Island with his wife, Debra, and their three children Alexandra ("Ally"), Geoffrey, and Michael. His parents Frank and Marie and brother Robert live across the street. Raymond's character is loosely based on the real-life Romano, as he is the father of twin boys and a girl. Ray is emotionally unable to take any sort of stand on anything, especially if it brings him to any sort of conflict with his mother—the exception is when he protests about sex or some trivial matter. Raymond's mother favors him over Robert.
- Debra Barone (Patricia Heaton) is Raymond's wife, and mother of Ally, Michael and Geoffrey. As a housewife, Debra claims she is frequently overworked, underappreciated, and stressed out. This leads to her yelling and occasionally attacking inanimate objects, largely because she has to deal with all the housework and her three rambunctious children with almost no assistance or support from Raymond; additionally, she constantly puts up with Marie's intrusiveness and criticism. On frequent occasions this frustration boils over and is vented towards Raymond. While Debra has a fractious relationship with Marie, she is shown to share many tender moments with Robert, and occasionally Frank.
- Robert Barone (Brad Garrett) is Raymond's older brother and the son of Frank and Marie. Standing at 6 ft 8 1/2 in (2.045 m), he is the tallest Barone, and has several quirks, the biggest being a nervous habit of touching food to his chin before eating it, once referred to as "crazy chin". Robert is often jealous of the attention that Raymond receives from their mother, to the exclusion of his every achievement. Robert has been a New York City police officer for over 23 years (explicitly stated as 15 years early in season 1) and attains the rank of lieutenant by the end of the series. His height, appearance, and depressed demeanor are the source of much humor. However, despite his imposing size, Robert is a very skilled dancer. Divorced from first wife Joanne prior to the beginning of the series, he is frequently unlucky with women, until his on-off relationship with his girlfriend Amy McDougall finally results in marriage. Also, despite his tough appearance, he appears to be more sensitive, affectionate, tender and open to sharing his emotions compared to the rest of his family.
- Marie Barone (Doris Roberts) is Raymond and Robert's mother and the wife of Frank. Intrusive, controlling, manipulative, and over-nurturing (at least with Raymond), she is a housewife who excels in cooking, cleaning, and other things dealing with keeping a good home and family. Marie and Frank live across the street from Raymond and Debra in Lynbrook, Long Island, New York, which often irritates the latter couple. Marie's meddling tendencies include going through their mail, redoing their laundry, and upstaging Debra in the kitchen. She also goes to great lengths to control Robert's love life and get him to settle down and bring her more grandchildren.
- Frank Barone (Peter Boyle) is Raymond and Robert's father and Marie's husband, a retired bookkeeper, and registered real estate agent, with a stubborn masculine personality and no interest in personal hygiene. A United States Army veteran, Frank served in the Korean War, which he frequently brings up to everyone's annoyance. He mocks his sons' inability to handle their own personal and domestic problems; unlike his sons, he is not intimidated by Marie and disparages her regularly with little to no provocation. Although both he and Marie maintain that he only married her for her cooking, he is shown to care about her genuinely. He is a member of the Order of the Caribou Lodge, and was named Man of the Year by his fellow members.
- Amy MacDougall (Monica Horan) (recurring seasons 1–7, starring seasons 8 & 9) becomes Robert Barone's second wife (in season 7, after years of dating), and is the best friend of Debra, who introduces her to Robert. A recurring character for the first seven seasons of the series, Amy became essentially a regular cast member for the remainder of the show's run. However, Horan's name did not get added to the opening credits until the final season. Many issues cause Amy and Robert to break up in the first six seasons, with one being blamed on Raymond, and another happening because Robert was seeing other women, one of whom was his ex-wife. Quite often, Amy apologizes to someone even if she did not do anything wrong. She was born to very religious parents who, according to Amy, "wouldn't yell if they were on fire." In real life, Horan is married to creator/executive producer Philip Rosenthal.
- Ally Barone (Madylin Sweeten) is the daughter of Raymond and Debra. She is the oldest of the Barone children. She is not seen much, even though she is credited in the main cast. She is said to be a better cook than her mother, and maybe someday her grandmother. In real life, Madylin is the sister of Sawyer and Sullivan Sweeten.
- Geoffrey Barone (Sawyer Sweeten) and Michael Barone (Sullivan Sweeten) are the twin sons of Raymond and Debra. Their names in the pilot were Gregory and Matthew. In real life, twins Sawyer and Sullivan are brothers of Madylin Sweeten.

== Development ==
=== Conception ===
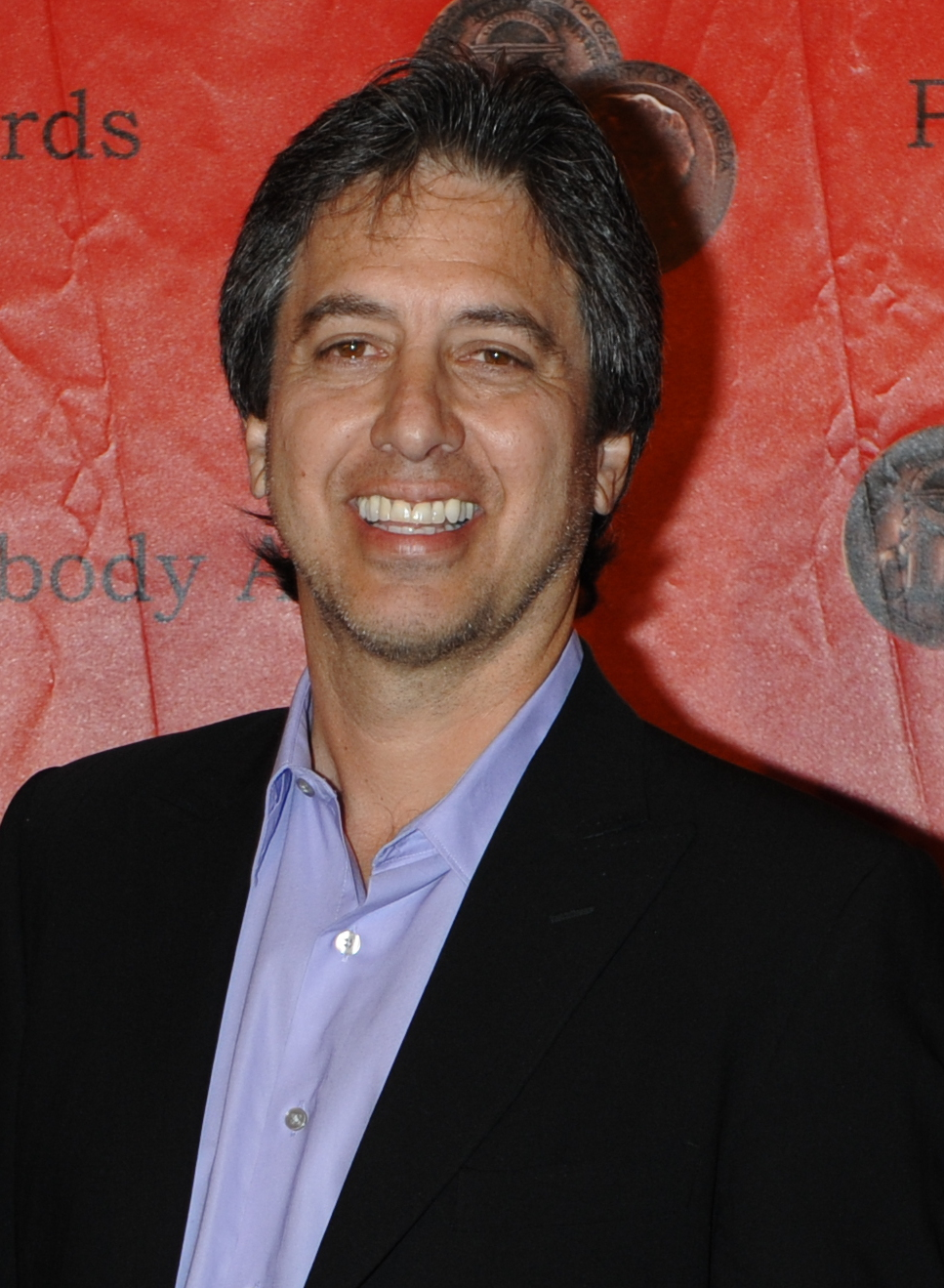
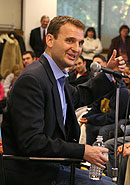
Everybody Loves Raymond is based on the real lives of not just Ray Romano (left) but also show-runner Phil Rosenthal (right).

In the 1990s, several television shows based on work from stand-up comedians, such as Home Improvement (1991–99) and Roseanne (1988–97), were successful. Ray Romano, a comedian for 12 years by the time Everybody Loves Raymond first aired, was one such comic to get development deals following a five-minute performance on the Late Show with David Letterman in the middle of 1995. David Letterman executive producer Rob Burnett recalled that "by the end [of the monologue] we already had lawyers lined up to work a deal with him."

In looking for a show-runner, Romano wanted somebody to share his tastes in humor, avoiding those who were into writing "devicey" material. Around a dozen candidates for the show-runner position were considered before Coach writer Philip Rosenthal, who sent a Frasier spec script to Letterman's Worldwide Pants. The company read the spec and sent Rosenthal a tape of Romano asking screenwriters to help him with an upcoming show based on his work; also in the tape, he stated that he had a hard time coming up with new material because of having to raise twin sons, and showcased a "new bit" of him shaking keys while saying "hey". Romano's sense of humor intrigued Rosenthal, reminding him of Bill Cosby's early work.

After viewing the tape, Rosenthal met with Romano in person at Art's Delicatessen & Restaurant on Ventura Boulevard about being a potential show runner. The encounter consisted of Romano and Rosenthal each discussing their families. Romano told Rosenthal he wanted to do a series about a comedian discussing current issues with friends at a coffee shop, but Rosenthal responded that kind of sitcom already existed and was a hit. Rosenthal, intrigued by Romano's crazy family fables and wanting to work around his lack of previous acting experience, then stated it would be most "comfortable" for Romano to have the Raymond character be very close to his real personality and in family circumstances reflective of Romano's home life. Although Romano has a brother named Robert in real life, he based the Robert in Raymond on another one of his brothers, Richard. Rosenthal also incorporated his own family experiences into the show, with his mother and wife serving as the basis for Marie and Debra respectively.

Most aspects of Romano's real life are replicated in the series, except for its setting of Long Island instead of Queens; Romano and the writers initially wanted the show to be set in Queens, but CBS executives ultimately chose Long Island due to its broad appeal, as it was a suburb with urban elements. Previous prime-time television series set in Long Island, such as The Hamptons (1983) and The Pruitts of Southampton (1966–67), never went beyond one season. Romano also explained, "There's a lot more kissing on the show than in real life"; and his wife Anna continued, "and they talk a lot more in the show than we ever do at home." The title Everybody Loves Raymond originated from a response Romano's brother Richard made after Ray won a CableACE stand-up award: "I had a day where people were shooting at me, and you're bringing home trophies. Everybody loves Raymond, don't they?" In the show's pilot, Robert states "Everybody loves Raymond."

Rosenthal pitched the show to CBS president Les Moonves, CBS comedy vice president David Himelfarb, CBS comedy development executive Wendi Goldstein, and CBS comedy and drama development head Gene Stein. He kept the pitch very simple: "it's [Romano] and his family, and his parents live across the street with his brother." CBS was lukewarm towards the show's low concept, but found it enough of a low-risk investment for the series to be green-lit. Letterman's involvement with Raymond amounted to nothing more than a meeting where he signed Rosenthal's show-runner contract and told him, "just don't embarrass us."

=== Casting ===
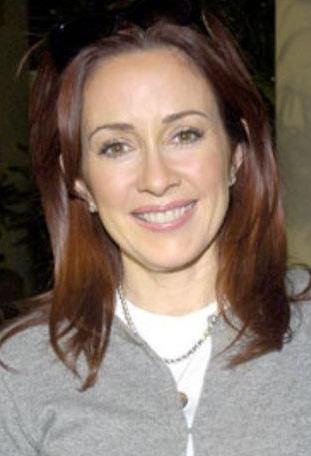
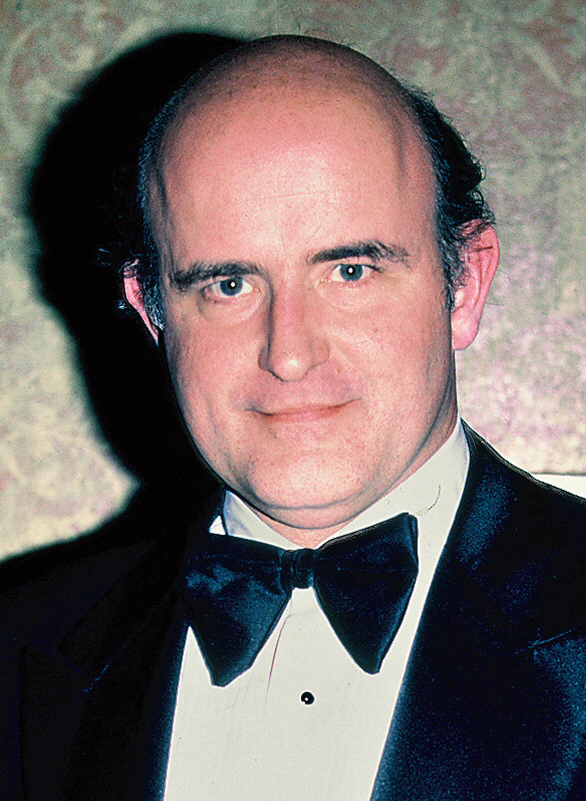
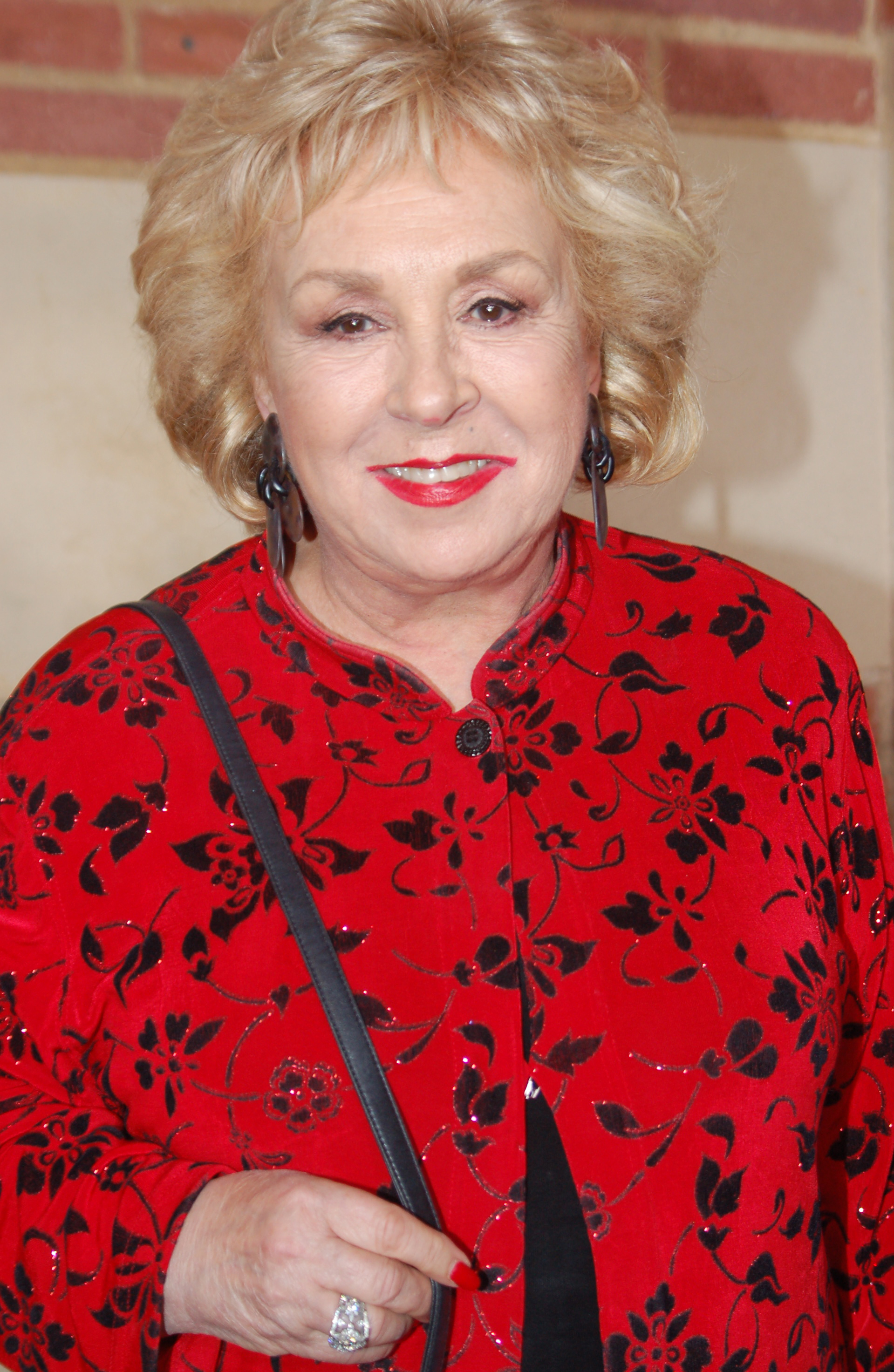
Patricia Heaton (left), Peter Boyle (middle), and Doris Roberts (right) were in emotional states that reflected their characters when auditioning for Everybody Loves Raymond.

For the non-titular lead roles of Everybody Loves Raymond, casting director Lisa Miller chose Patricia Heaton and Brad Garrett, who made several appearances in sitcoms before; and Doris Roberts and Peter Boyle, both film actors. Everybody Loves Raymond was Heaton's fourth lead role in a sitcom after the short-lived Room for Two (1992–1993), Someone Like Me (1994), and Women of the House (1995). When she read the pilot script during pilot season, she thought it was "beautifully written" although found the character of Debra uninteresting. Miller explained that she had to "Taft-Hartley" Romano, who did not have much acting experience before Everybody Loves Raymond, in order to get around legal Screen Actors Guild requirements to star in the show. He also needed trainers to make sure he performed the character of a likable protagonist well.

Garrett (like Romano, also a stand-up comedian) was the first actor to be cast after Romano, as well as the only actor to audition without Romano in the room. Garrett explained that while CBS initially wanted a small, Danny DeVito-esque character who had a "bulldog" attitude towards Raymond, he, a much taller actor, portrayed Robert as more "beaten-down" and "succumb[ing] to the fact that he's a loser" when auditioning.

For the auditions of Heaton, Boyle, and Roberts, they were in the moods of the characters in the scenes they performed, and their auditions were very quick. Heaton was in the middle of getting-by doing babysitting work and clipping coupons when auditioning, making her very stressed. Miller chose Heaton for the role of Debra for being "very focused, real, like Helen Hunt in Mad About You." Boyle, an actor recommended for Frank by Moonves, had a troublesome time getting to his audition location due to schedule changes and poor directions, which made him very grumpy and "in character" when he arrived. Rosenthal admitted to casting Boyle "out of fear" in response to Boyle's bitter attitude. Roberts was called by the casting team for the role of Marie after going through more than 100 actresses. She was initially reluctant to audition due to being busy with directing a 23-character play, but her agents insisted she had time; an "overwhelmed" Roberts did zero preparation, which was unusual for her, and performed her audition from her "gut reaction."

== Production ==
Each episode was created in a workweek that consisted of actors reading through and rehearsing the script on Monday, actors rehearsing and the writers tweaking the script on Tuesday, CBS running through what the actors rehearsed on Wednesday, camera blocking on Thursday, and filming on Friday. A typical writing session started with each of the writers discussing their lives, which served as the basis for episode scripts; as Rosenthal summarized the process, "talking, talking, talking and then all of a sudden, that's a story." Will MacKenzie, who directed for Everybody Loves Raymond on the second, third, and fourth seasons, recalled the writers being so efficient that thirteen episode scripts were completed by the time a season began airing. When shooting episodes, Rosenthal was very stern about the actors sticking to the script and avoiding ad libbing, although "alternative" lines were put in the script for some episodes.

Garrett compared acting in episodes of Raymond to the improvisational methods used by the cast in Seinfeld (1989–98). Garrett had appeared in a Seinfeld episode, playing an obsessed car mechanic that steals Jerry Seinfeld's car.

The house used for exterior shots of Ray and Debra's home is located at 135 Margaret Boulevard in Merrick, New York and was worth $500,000 as of August 2018; as in the show, it is located across the street from the home used for exteriors of Frank and Marie's house (house number 136).

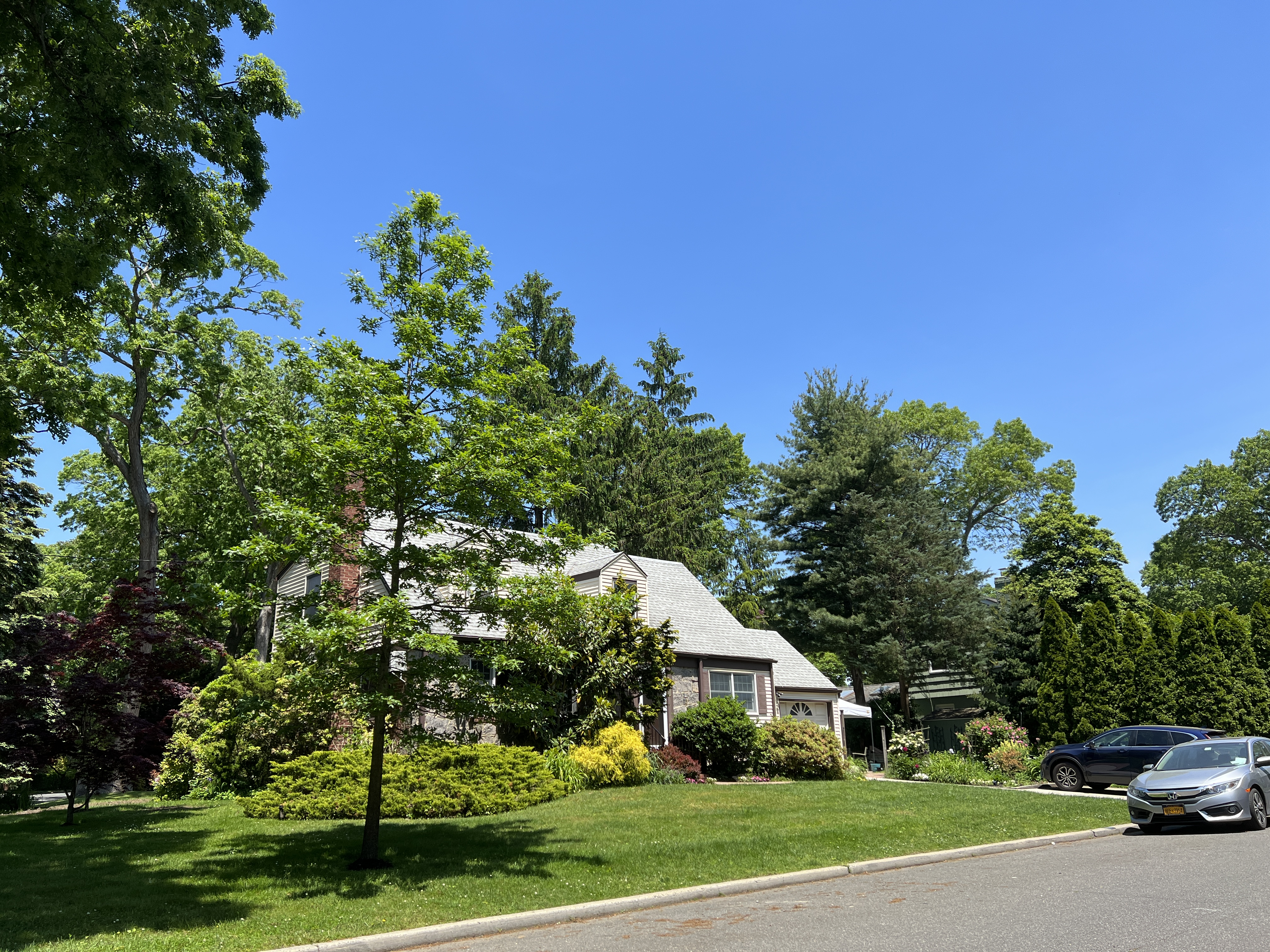
The home used for the exterior shots of Ray and Debra's house in 2022.

== Style ==
For Everybody Loves Raymond, Rosenthal went for a classic sitcom style a la The Honeymooners (1955–56), avoiding references to current culture in order to give it a timeless quality. Jeremy Stevens stated that the show differed from most sitcoms of its time for its focus on storytelling and reflection on most people's real lives.

Julie Pernworth, a comedy development president at CBS, categorized Everybody Loves Raymond as "one of the most traditional sitcoms to come along in a long time." As Rosenthal put it, Raymond was a "sophisticated" version of a family sitcom, which was emphasized via the show's piano-heavy background music and the use of The New Yorker typeface for credits. In composing the show's theme, Terry Trotter and Rick Marotta used the first few measures of a song from Woody Allen's film Manhattan (1979) and improvised the rest of the piece. Episodes of Everybody Loves Raymond are emotionally dynamic presentations of otherwise prosaic premises typical for traditional sitcoms.

SUNY Press' book The Sitcom Reader (2016) analyzed Raymond was part of a trend in 1990s television of family sitcoms geared towards older audiences, which resulted in the scripts not focusing so much on the child characters and being entirely about grown-ups bickering at each other. While the second season was in production, Romano expressed the challenge of having to write "weird" adult humor within "parameters" of a show about a family: "I want to write a show where I have anxiety attacks, and we're all very concerned about that. Can the star of the show be a father who has anxiety attacks and flips out? Will that sit well with people?" This involved trying to keep the presence of the child characters as little as possible: "To be upstaged by toddlers? I get enough of that at home." As Romano described the stand-up material the show is based on upon the show's first season airing, "I don't want to be a spokesman for family values, but that's the way my standup is perceived. My character is a father who loves his family but who would also love a little freedom." According to TV critic Jones Ostrow, Raymond "explored the tortuous/loving relationships of parents and adult children, of couples, of siblings and the Peter Pan syndrome that attaches to baby boomer males, sports nuts in particular."

== Connection to other sitcoms ==
Kevin James was an actor and writer on Everybody Loves Raymond. Once James got his own show, The King of Queens, the two shows crossed over.

The first crossover happened on The King of Queens. In it, Ray Barone and Doug Heffernan become friends. Later on the same night, Kevin James showed up on Everybody Loves Raymond as Doug Heffernan. The shows crossed over several more times.

Ray Romano also turned up in an episode of The Nanny: when that show's Fran Fine (Fran Drescher) attends her high school reunion, one of her classmates is revealed to be Ray Barone. (Romano and Drescher were real-life classmates at Hillcrest High School in Jamaica, Queens in the 1970s.)

Ray Romano and Peter Boyle appeared as their respective characters in the episode "Lucas Raymondicus" of Cosby, another CBS show, in 1997.

== Foreign remakes ==
=== Russian version and documentary ===
In 2009, series creator/producer Philip Rosenthal traveled to Russia to adapt the show for local audiences. His experience was documented by a film crew and released as the documentary feature Exporting Raymond. The Russian version is titled (in Russian) Воронины (Voronin's Family, a Russian surname sounding similar to the family's name, The Barones).

=== Other versions ===
The show was adapted in Poland under the title Wszyscy kochają Romana (Everybody Loves Roman). It was picked up by TVN and premiered on September 2, 2011 (note that Warner Bros. International Television, the international distributor, is part of Warner Bros. Discovery; TVN was not part of Warner Bros. until 2022, when Discovery acquired WarnerMedia from AT&T). However, due to low ratings (fewer than 2 million viewers a week), the station put the show on hiatus after four episodes.

In Egypt, a sitcom called El Bab Fil Bab (الباب في الباب), which means Close Doors in Arabic, is produced by Sony Pictures Television, translating Everybody Loves Raymond with minor changes to adapt the Eastern culture. The first season aired in the month of Ramadan 2011; second season in 2012.

A Dutch remake called Iedereen is gek op Jack (Everybody is crazy about Jack) premiered in February 2011. The second season started airing in March 2012 and ended in May 2012.

An Israeli remake called Mishpacah Lo Bochrim (משפחה לא בוחרים) (You Can't Choose Your Family) premiered in October 2012 and was cancelled after 10 episodes aired.

A pilot for a British remake, titled The Smiths, was commissioned to be produced for BBC One and was filmed in May 2013 at Elstree Studios. Lee Mack wrote and starred in the pilot, as Michael Smith. The pilot also starred Catherine Tate, Tom Davis, Gwen Taylor and David Troughton.

An Indian remake, titled Sumit Sambhal Lega (सुमित संभाल लेगा – Sumit Will Handle Everything), premiered on August 31, 2015, on STAR Plus.

A Czech remake called Rudyho Má Každý Rád (Everybody Loves Rudy) premiered on ČT1 on August 31, 2015, comprising 12 episodes.

== Syndication ==
On December 20, 1998, two Tribune Broadcasting stations, WPIX in New York and KTLA in Los Angeles, bought rights for syndication of Everybody Loves Raymond from Eyemark Entertainment; Variety reported Eyemark receiving a license fee of $90,000 to $100,000 per week and barter advertising of one-and-a-half minutes. Although Eyemark planned for the two stations to start the re-runs in fall 2000, it moved the date to fall 2001 to avoid competition with other sitcoms beginning off-network runs in 2000. The deal allowed the two stations to re-run the show for four-and-a-half years. On January 26, 1999, the cable channel TBS paid Everybody Loves Raymond distributor Eyemark Entertainment for four years of syndication rights of the show starting in the fall of 2004 until it was removed in 2021.

From 2001 to 2016, Everybody Loves Raymond was in broadcast syndication on local stations in television markets across the United States. Currently the show can be seen on TV Land and IFC. It began airing on MeTV on October 13, 2025. In Canada, the show can be seen on CMT and DejaView.

The show is still broadcast regularly in the United Kingdom. From 2000 to 2007, King World distributed the show for off-network syndication and Warner Bros. International Television handled international distribution. In 2007, CBS Television Distribution took over King World's distribution. CBS only owns American syndication rights; ancillary rights are controlled by HBO and Warner Bros. Television (WBIT distributes the series outside the United States in conjunction with HBO; while Warner Bros. Discovery Home Entertainment own DVD rights worldwide). The show aired every morning as a double bill on Channel 4 in the United Kingdom, as part of its Breakfast line up from 08:00-09:00, and, as of 2024 continues to be shown most weekday mornings until it was replaced by The King of Queens in September 2024.

Everybody Loves Raymond also airs on Channel 4 & Comedy Central in the United Kingdom and in Australia on Network 10, on 10 Peach (a sub-channel of Network 10) and on Foxtel's Pay TV network TVH!TS previously called TV1 (formerly aired on FOX Classics). The show reruns in India on the channel Romedy Now.

In the United States, the series is now available for reruns on free over the air broadcast network MeTV since October 2025. The last time the series was available for reruns on broadcast television networks were in late 2000s or very early 2010s.

== Home media ==
HBO released the Complete Series of Everybody Loves Raymond on DVD in Regions 1, 2, and 4. Region 4 Complete Box Set was released on August 13, 2008. In Australia, the first five seasons were re-released in 2006 in slimmer packaging (originals were wide spine cases). Also, some were released with a cardboard slip cover. In North America the DVDs were repackaged between 2009 and 2012 in standard sized DVD packaging. All episodes were available on Netflix for streaming until September 1, 2016, also the date Exporting Raymond was taken off the platform. Also on September 14, 2004, The Complete 1st Season was released on VHS. The sixth-season DVD set contained the episode "Marie's Sculpture", which previously had not aired in the United Kingdom and was not released until almost five years after the end of the 6th season.

DVD name	Ep #	Release dates		
DVD name	Ep #	Region 1	Region 2	Region 4
The Complete 1st Season	22	September 14, 2004	January 17, 2005	December 16, 2004
The Complete 2nd Season	25	December 14, 2004	July 4, 2005	April 27, 2005
The Complete 3rd Season	26	May 3, 2005	January 16, 2006	July 12, 2005
The Complete 4th Season	24	September 13, 2005	May 1, 2006	April 5, 2006
The Complete 5th Season	25	December 6, 2005	July 3, 2006	July 5, 2006
Holidays with the Barones	3	December 10, 2005		
The Complete 6th Season	24	May 9, 2006	October 2, 2006	October 4, 2006
The Complete 7th Season	25	September 19, 2006	January 15, 2007	April 4, 2007
The Complete 8th Season	23	May 8, 2007	July 16, 2007	October 3, 2007
The Complete 9th Season	16	September 18, 2007	November 12, 2007	October 3, 2007
The Complete Series	210	October 30, 2007	September 5, 2011	August 13, 2008

== Streaming ==
Until 2016, the series was available on Netflix in the United States. The series joined Peacock's Premium tier on July 15, 2020. The series also joined Paramount+ on December 14, 2022.

== Reception ==
=== Critical response ===
Los Angeles Daily News critic David Kronke praised Raymond for being "the quintessentially honest sitcom. It's neither too hokey nor too crass. It depicts families as dissolute yet inextricably bound together, just like they really are, and finds the humor in those real frictions that threaten, yet never manage, to burst family units apart. Its characterizations are among the most finely defined on TV. Debra, with her vaguely no-nonsense disgust of Raymond's simpleton-ness, is unlike any sitcom mom ever. Doris Roberts' Marie had a sinister streak long before Nancy Marchand's Livia showed up on The Sopranos. Raymond is also one of the few contemporary sitcoms that has figured out how to implement and even exploit the four-camera, live-audience situation, which is no simple feat."

A 1997 review by Bruce Fretts, which gave the show the same score, said that the show "may now be the best sitcom on the air." Common Sense Media's Betsy Wallace, who awarded the show four out of five stars, wrote: "the cast is stellar and plotlines shed light on universal human insecurities, such as doubting that your spouse still finds you attractive as you grow older." Plugged In (publication) said in their review, "Seven years and a mantle full of Emmys later, Raymond is still smartly scripted, now with new characters added to a maturing, expanding family."

Reviews named Garrett the show's "secret weapon" and responsible for "the bulk of the show's comic high points."

=== Accolades ===
During its nine seasons, Everybody Loves Raymond was nominated for 69 Primetime Emmy Awards, winning 15 of them, including 10 for acting. The series was also nominated for 21 Screen Actors Guild Awards (1 win) and won the Writers Guild of America Award for Episodic Comedy for "Italy" in 2002.

=== American television ratings ===
Note: Each American network television season starts in late September and ends in late May, which coincides with the completion of May sweeps. All times mentioned in this section were Eastern & Pacific

The series finale scored a 20.2/29 rating/share, 32.94 million viewers and an 11.2/26 rating/share among adults 18–49. At 8pm, Everybody Loves Raymond: The Last Laugh scored a 15.3/24 rating/share, 24.52 million viewers and a 7.5/21 rating/share among adults 18–49. Throughout the latter six seasons of the show, Everybody Loves Raymond maintained its position on the top ten rankings.

The highest average rating for the series is in italic text.

Season	Episodes	Timeslot (EST)	Season premiere	Season finale	TV season	Rank	Rating
1	22	Friday 8:30 p.m. (September 13, 1996 – February 28, 1997); Monday 8:30 p.m. (March 3, 1997 – April 7, 1997)	September 13, 1996	April 7, 1997	1996-97	#84	7.8
2	25	Monday 8:30 p.m.	September 22, 1997	May 18, 1998	1997-98	#33	13.3
3	26	Monday 9:00 p.m.	September 21, 1998	May 24, 1999	1998-99	#10	15.5
4	24	Monday 9:00 p.m.	September 20, 1999	May 22, 2000	1999-2000	#12	17.1
5	25	Monday 9:00 p.m.	October 2, 2000	May 21, 2001	2000-01	#5	19.1
6	24	Monday 9:00 p.m.	September 24, 2001	May 13, 2002	2001-02	#4	20.0
7	25	Monday 9:00 p.m.	September 23, 2002	May 19, 2003	2002-03	#7	18.6
8	23	Monday 9:00 p.m.	September 22, 2003	May 24, 2004	2003-04	#9	17.4
9	16	Monday 9:00 p.m.	September 20, 2004	May 16, 2005	2004-05	#9	16.9

== Reunion specials ==
In 2025, it was announced that the surviving cast would reunite later that year for a 90-minute special to celebrate the show's thirtieth anniversary. The special aired on CBS on November 24, 2025, and consisted of remembrances, outtakes and tributes to deceased cast members Boyle, Roberts and Sawyer Sweeten. Romano and Rosenthal asserted there would not be a reboot or sequel series due to their deaths.

Due to the success of the special, CBS commissioned a second special that features unaired interviews and outtakes that aired on December 22, 2025.
