= John Blackman =

Australian radio and television presenter (1947–2024)

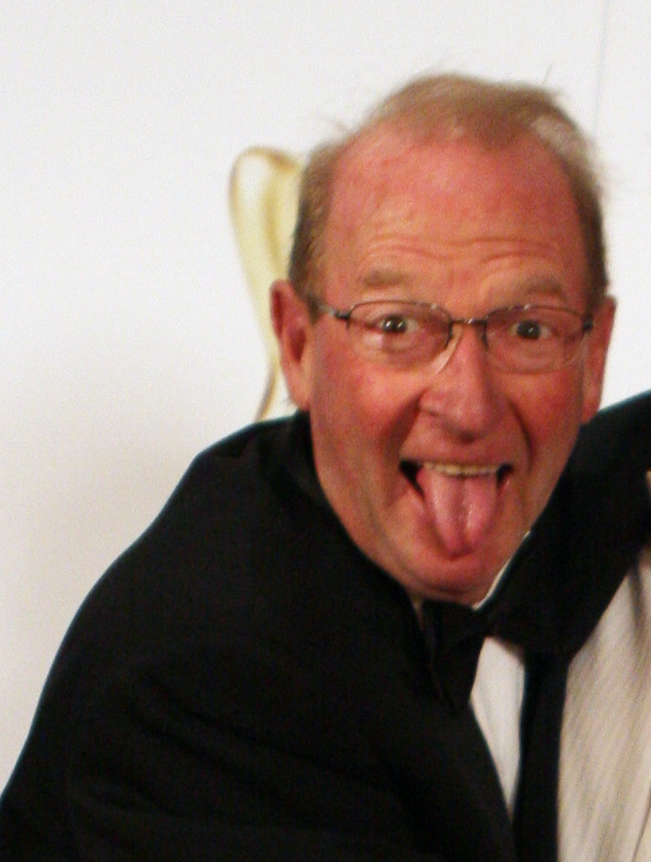
- Blackman in 2011
- Born: 14 July 1947; Melbourne, Victoria, Australia
- Died: 4 June 2024 (aged 76)
- Occupations: Television presenter; radio personality; voice artist; comedy writer; author
- Years active: 1969−2024
- Employer: Mediaman Productions - self employed
- Television: Hey Hey It's Saturday
- Spouse: Cecile
- Children: 1
- Website: www.blackman.com.au

John Blackman (14 July 1947 – 4 June 2024) was an Australian radio and television presenter, voice artist, comedy writer and author. He was most widely-known for his voice-over work for the long-running Nine Network comedy variety show Hey Hey It's Saturday from 1971 until 1999, returning for reunion specials in 2009 and in 2021, with a brief relaunch in 2010.

== Biography ==
Blackman grew up in the Melbourne suburb of Mount Waverley, where he attended Syndal Primary School until 1959 and completed year 10 at Syndal Technical School in 1963. He was an avid supporter of the Fitzroy Football Club, now the Brisbane Lions. On leaving school (and home) at 16, he worked in a succession of occupations: customs clerk, cash van salesman for a cigarette distributor, sales representative for a perfume company, and spruiker in the Myer Bargain Basement. At the age of 22, he decided on a career in radio.

=== Media work ===
He worked in radio from 1969 but was probably best known for his 28-year stint as announcer and character voice-over for the Nine Network's Hey Hey It's Saturday, Australia's longest-running variety show. One of his best-known characters was a stick puppet known as "Dickie Knee".

In 1969, he joined 2GN Goulburn as an announcer, newsreader, copywriter, salesman, and record librarian.

In 1970, he joined 2CA Canberra, where he worked in a variety of on-air shifts for 18 months until mid-1971, when he joined 3AW in Melbourne. As evening announcer, Blackman worked with the Reverend Alex Kenworthy for a number of years on "Nightline".

In 1974, he joined 3AK where he hosted the morning show until 1975, when he moved to Sydney to join 2UE as a "floating" announcer for just three months. At TCN-9 in Sydney, he was a staff continuity announcer and daytime newsreader for National Nine News alongside his work on Hey Hey It's Saturday, which he would do "down the line" to GTV-9 in Melbourne every Saturday from an announcing booth at TCN-9.

Blackman returned to 3AK Melbourne in 1979 to host the breakfast show until 1981. Later that year, he joined 3AW to host their breakfast show with Paul Barber. After Barber left shortly afterward, he was replaced by former ATV-0 newsreader and staff announcer, Bruce Mansfield. This combination became one of the most successful in Australian radio history, with 3AW breakfast topping the ratings for five consecutive years until 1986.

After leaving 3AW in controversial circumstances on 30 April 1986, Blackman became part of the short-lived CBC Network (2UE/3AK) experiment; and, in December of that year, his contract was not renewed.

From 1987 to 1990, he cohosted a breakfast show on 3UZ (now RSN Racing & Sport) with Coodabeen Champions member Ian Cover and, later, Wilbur Wilde.

In 1997, after a seven-year hiatus from radio, Blackman was employed as the cohost of the 3AK breakfast show with Anna "Pinky" Pinkus and Denis Donoghue (Lawyers, Guns & Money) until 2000.

In 2004, he joined Triple M Adelaide and was cohost of The John Blackman & Jane Reilly Breakfast Show until December 2007.

Other television shows Blackman appeared on and announced for include Blankety Blanks, Personality Squares, The Paul Hogan Show, The Daryl Somers Tonight Show, Holiday Island, Family Feud and many others. Blackman was interviewed on ABC's Talking Heads in 2006.

=== Accusations of racism ===
In 2009, Blackman returned as part of the Hey Hey It's Saturday reunion specials to reprise his voice-over role. Despite respectable ratings, the show's contract was not renewed for 2011. During the second 2009 comeback episode, a Red Faces act called "the Jackson Jive" (a Jackson 5 parody) caused outrage, especially in the UK and USA, after the act dressed up in blackface to perform the Jackson 5 hit "Can You Feel It" in a jive style. The show, and Blackman, had a longstanding history of mocking people of colour, which was demonstrated in a March 2021 video compilation by John Patterson, which has received 165,000 views as of 2023. Blackman also had a four-decade feud with Kamahl, which was instigated in part by Blackman and Daryl Somers' persistent bullying on Hey Hey, including racist jokes. While Somers eventually made a full apology regarding his past actions after initially being criticised for invoking cancel culture to defend his actions, Blackman doubled down upon his past actions: "Goodness me[,] Kamahl, 37 years and you're still 'humiliated'." Blackman's racist jokes and humiliations were numerous, but a particularly egregious example was when he surprised Kamahl with white powder being slammed into his face. Blackman joked at the time that this made him a "real white man".

=== Return to radio ===
From April 2015 to May 2016, he was employed at MAGIC 1278 in Melbourne and MAGIC 882 in Brisbane as their Breakfast Announcer between 6.00am and 10.00am, initially as co-host with Jane Holmes, who resigned in April 2015 for personal reasons. Blackman continued in a solo role until May 2016, when he was unceremoniously dumped by Macquarie Media Ltd.

According to the MML COO, Adam Lang: “He's a very respected and highly regarded broadcaster but his style of broadcasting, while excellent, wasn't working on the MAGIC format.”

Significantly, in the third radio survey for 2016, (released a few days later) Blackman actually increased his Melbourne audience from 1.5% to 2.2% and his cumulative audience to 19,000 listeners (2,000 more than the station average).

== Corporate work ==
Blackman was a corporate host and compere for over 800 business award nights, conferences and social occasions. He also regularly voiced radio and television advertisements.

== Writing ==
Blackman authored several books, including Aussie Slang, Aussie Gags (1998) and More Aussie Gags, Don't Come the Raw Prawn, Best of Aussie Slang, Aussie Slang Dictionary, and the Dickie Knee Bumper Comic Book. They were released through Pan Macmillan Australia.

== Personal life ==
Blackman was married twice. He married his second wife Cecile on 2 December 1972, and they have an adult daughter.

On Christmas Eve 2007, Blackman suffered a seizure brought on by a golf ball size (benign) meningioma brain tumour. After six hours of surgery, it was successfully removed at The Alfred Hospital in Melbourne and he had a full recovery.

Blackman was also diagnosed with an aggressive form of skin cancer in 2019, resulting in his jaw being removed. The cancer reappeared in 2022, with Blackman undergoing extensive surgery to remove the top of his skull and the skin from his scalp.

Blackman died from a heart attack on 4 June 2024, at the age of 76.

== Community and charity work ==
Blackman was a member of the Patrons Council of the Epilepsy Foundation of Victoria. and an active Australia Day (Victoria) ambassador. He was also a past committee member and past vice-chairman of Variety – the Children's Charity, most recently an honorary member.

== Famous characters ==
- Dickie Knee – a polystyrene head with black hair and a blue cap on a stick
- Alfred Desk Mike
- The Angel – a small angelic creature made from an old Barbie doll and superimposed on the screen
- Doctor Ben Dover
- Charlie Who – a Chinese character
- The Giant
- The Man from Jupiter
- Mrs Macgillicuddy – a hideous old hag with a raspy voice
- Norman Neumann – a boom microphone with a moustache, which is in fact a Sennheiser MKH-816-P48
- Sammy Sennheiser – replacement for Norman
- Baby Kangaroos – sounds a bit like the Angel

== Radio career ==
- 2GN Morning Show (1969)
- 2CA Morning Show (1970)
- 3AW Evening Show (1972)
- 3AK Breakfast Show (1975)
- 2UE Night Show (1977)
- 2GB Breakfast (1977 [one week])
- 3AK Breakfast Show (1979)
- 3AW Breakfast Show (1981–1986)
- 3AK/2UE CBC Network Breakfast Show (1986–1987)
- 3UZ Breakfast Show (1987–1990)
- 3AK Breakfast Show (1997–2000)
- Triple M Adelaide Breakfast Show (2005–2007)
- 3GG Mornings (2009–2014)
- 3AW Afternoon replacement for Denis Walter (2011)
- 3AW fill-in host on 3AW's Nightline program (2012–)
- Magic 1278 and Magic 882 Breakfast (2015–2016)

== Television career ==
- Hey Hey It's Saturday (1971–99, 2009–10) (Nine Network)
- Family Feud – announcer (1978-1984) (Nine Network)
- Daytime newsreader (TCN 9)
- The Penthouse Club (HSV 7)
- The Paul Hogan Show (GTV 9)
- Daryl & Ossie Show (ATV 10)
- Personality Squares (ATV 10)
- Daryl Somers Tonight Show (GTV 9)
- Blankety Blanks (ATV 10)
- Holiday Island (ATV 10)
- Prisoner (ATV 10)
- Safeway New Faces judge (GTV 9)
- World's Craziest Inventions (GTV 9)
- Toon Time (111 Hits)
