= Pam Barnes (television producer) =

Pam Barnes is an Australian television producer and industry veteran who has worked on various Australian television programs for over forty years.

== Early career ==
Barnes was aged 20 when she began temporary work at the Nine Network, initially for one month. After the month, Barnes continued to be employed and eventually began working on In Melbourne Tonight co-ordinating scripts for the program's live commercials.

== Notable Television Credits ==
=== Family Feud ===
Barnes is currently the executive producer for FremantleMedia Australia, responsible for co-ordinating the production of Network Ten nightly game show Family Feud. Barnes was also executive producer of the program's previous incarnation Bert's Family Feud, which was hosted by Bert Newton on the Nine Network in 2006.

=== The Circle ===
Barnes was executive producer of Network Ten morning program The Circle which aired from February 2010 until it was suddenly axed by the network in August 2012.

On the final edition of The Circle, former musical director of Network Ten programs Good Morning Australia and Australian Idol John Foreman criticised the network's treatment of Barnes saying it was shocking that she had been given a week to pack her things instead of being acknowledged with a speech and gold watch at the Christmas party.

Ten News presenter Natarsha Belling also acknowledged Barnes during the final edition of The Circle joking that her "alleged TV talents" were unimportant compared to her ability to keep Belling on the dance floor until 4am following the 2012 Logie Awards.

=== Hey Hey It's Saturday ===
Barnes had a long association with the popular iconic Nine Network variety program Hey Hey It's Saturday, producing the show for Somers Carroll from 1991 until its demise in 1999 before returning to serve as producer of the program's two reunion specials which aired in 2009. However, Barnes declined to return for the one-off 20-episode series in 2010.

In a 2004 feature article about the program's long serving host, Daryl Somers which featured various criticisms and analysis of Somers' behaviour during the time he hosted the show, Barnes defended Somers accusing the media of having a particular way of dealing with "tall poppies" and asking rhetorically whether any of the critics could do what Somers had achieved during his career.

=== Australia's Got Talent ===
Barnes served as executive producer of the third season of Australia's Got Talent which aired on the Seven Network in 2009. In the lead-up to the show, Barnes travelled around Australia to participate in the audition process, choosing which hopeful contestants would appear on the show.

=== Logie Awards and Carols By Candlelight ===
Barnes was executive producer of the live broadcasts of 49th and 50th Logie Awards on the Nine Network in 2007 and 2008 respectively. During this time, Barnes also executive producer of Nine's live telecast of Melbourne's Carols by Candlelight. In 2008, it was reported that Barnes was leaving Nine after the network told her that they were planning a different direction of both their Logies and Carols by Candlelight telecasts and that there was insufficient work to keep her employed at their station in Melbourne.

=== The X Factor ===
Barnes was supervising producer of the first season of the Australian version of The X Factor which aired on Network Ten in 2005, prior to the program's successful revival on the Seven Network in 2010.

=== The Singing Bee ===
Barnes was executive producer of the first season of The Singing Bee, which aired on the Nine Network in 2007.

=== The Einstein Factor ===
Barnes was series producer of ABC Television quiz show The Einstein Factor.

=== Dusty, Little by Little ===
Barnes served as series producer of Dusty, Little by Little, a 2006 7-part observational documentary about the Australian stage show about the life of Dusty Springfield called Dusty: The Musical.

=== Test Australia ===
Barnes was Senior Producer of Test Australia: The National IQ Test in 2002.

=== Bali Bombings Telethon ===
Following the 2002 Bali bombings, Barnes was a producer on a special telethon broadcast organised to raise money for the victims.

=== Search for a Supermodel ===
Barnes was a producer on the first two seasons on Network Ten reality program Search for a Supermodel in 2000 and 2001.

=== Australia Live ===
Barnes worked on Australia Live, a live four-hour telecast hosted by the Nine Network on New Year's Day in 1988, and simulcast on ABC and SBS to launch the Australian Bicentenary. Barnes lists the broadcast, which featured live crosses to over 70 Australian locations, as a career highlight.

=== Sale of the Century ===
Barnes was a producer on the Nine Network's popular iconic nightly quiz show Sale of the Century in 1988.

=== Don Lane Show ===
Barnes worked on the Don Lane Show which aired on the Nine Network from 1975 until 1983.

=== In Melbourne Tonight ===
Barnes worked on In Melbourne Tonight which aired on the Nine Network from 1957 until 1970.

== Awards ==
Barnes has possession of two Logie Awards - the Logie Award for Most Popular Australian Program which was awarded to the Don Lane Show in 1974 and the Logie Award for Best Entertainment Program which was awarded to The Circle in 2011.

== Views About Women In Television ==
Barnes has said that while she thinks there are quite a few women working in television production, she believes that there is a sad lack of women in management roles at the Australian television networks.

== Calls for Hall of Fame Induction ==
In recent years, the organisers of the annual Logie Awards have experienced criticism for not inducting more females into its Logie Hall of Fame with many saying female industry veterans such as Barnes are worthy of induction. To date, there are only five women in the Logie Awards Hall of Fame (Ruth Cracknell, Noni Hazlehurst, Kerri-Anne Kennerly, Rebecca Gibney and Magda Szubanski) compared to 30 men.

== Personal life ==
Barnes is divorced and has two daughters. Her ex-husband has since died.
