= The Daryl and Ossie Cartoon Show =

- Genre: children's block
- Presented by: Daryl Somers; Ernie Carroll
- Country of origin: Australia
- Original language: English
- No. of seasons: 1

Production
- Running time: 60 minutes

Original release
- Network: Nine Network
- Release: 1977

The Daryl and Ossie Cartoon Show is an Australian afternoon children's television block aired on the Nine Network in 1977 every weekday at 4pm. It was hosted by Daryl Somers and Ossie Ostrich played by Ernie Carroll.
