= Keith Houghton-Webb =

Musician

Keith Houghton-Webb (née Keith Webb) is a musician, born 5 February 1959 in London, England, to John and Shirley Webb.

Webb moved from England to Australia in 1967. Within a couple of years of arriving in Australia, Keith joined school-mates to form a small music group and entered a number of junior talent shows in Adelaide (South Australia). Keith and his older brother Mike received the "Encouragement Award" alongside Faye Nelson and Deborah Kirk on SAS 10's New Faces in 1971, before going on to win the final of the season.

At the age of 12 Keith (and brother Mike) co-compared and contributed musically to a new show Hey Hey It's Saturday. The principal host of the show was Dean Davis.

After a single season, the format of "Hey Hey" was changed and within a few years the Melbourne show hosted by Daryl Somers was syndicated throughout the Nine Network (Australia Wide).

Keith and Mike continued to perform musically both on local television stations, the local band scene, and even on ABC Radio throughout the 70's.

Both Mike and Keith have appeared alongside the likes of Lisa Edwards who later went on to be one of John Farnham's backing singers. Mike & Keith performed as one of the support acts for Farnham during an Australia Day concert at Memorial Drive in 1973.

Their performances also included a number of "live" appearances on local radio stations.

Mike and Keith formed the band "Web" in the late 70's, performing at various Adelaide venues, eventually recording a number of their original songs at the ABC studios in Collinswood, showcasing their talent on ABC radio.[3]

Keith turned his gift for music to worship leading in the Christian church in 2001. Having the role of principal worship leader and music director in a number of churches such as Vision Community Church (Toowoomba), On The Edge Christian Centre (Toowoomba), Sentinel Christian Ministries (Adelaide), New Creation Christian Church (Burpengary). Keith now serves as one of the worship leaders at Axis Church (North Lakes).

Sadly, on 23 January 2014 Keith succumbed to oesophageal cancer. He leaves behind his wife Wendy, and sons, Ryan and Mitchell Houghton-Webb.

== See also ==
- Hey Hey It's Saturday - Australian television show on which Keith and Brother Mike were co-hosts
- New Faces (Australian) - Talent Show on which Keith and brother Mike appeared in 1971
- Mike Webb (pastor) - Keith's brother
