= Mike Webb (pastor) =

- Born: Michael John Webb; 21 September 1956 (age 69); London, England
- Occupations: Pastor and Musician
- Known for: Appeared with brother Keith on Hey Hey its Saturday, Adelaide, in late 1970s and various TV entertainment shows. Senior Pastor of Grow Church
- Title: Senior Pastor
- Spouse: Chrys Webb
- Children: Lauren, Marc and Luke Webb
- Parent(s): John and Shirley Webb

Mike Webb was born in London on 21 September 1956, and migrated to Australia at age 11 in 1967. Webb was initially well known for his appearances on Channel NWS-9 in Adelaide in the 1970s. The "Webb Brothers"were regular guests on a number of TV variety / entertainment programs. He later became a Christian, and eventually a pastor and the South Australian state leader for the Apostolic Church Australia.

== Background ==
Webb and his brother Keith Webb had a passion for music at a young age, which led them to their appearances and performances on local television channel NWS-9 in Adelaide. The "Webb Brothers"were regular guests on a number of TV variety / entertainment programs.

The Webb brothers initially received the "Encouragement Award" alongside Faye Nelson and Deborah Kirk on SAS 10's New Faces in 1971. This was a unique event, as it was the first occasion that three acts had received the award in the same show. The Webb brothers later went on to win the grand final of the series, and became guest presenters on numerous TV Telethons, a popular form of raising funds for charity in the 1970s. They also appeared regularly on NWS 9's Stars of Tomorrow and were popular guests on Ernie Sigley's Adelaide Tonight in the 1970s. In particular, they became teen hosts on Adelaide's version of the popular television show Hey Hey It's Saturday in 1973.

However, Hey Hey It's Saturday only lasted a single season before the format was changed, and within a few years the Melbourne show hosted by Daryl Somers was syndicated throughout the Nine Network Australia Wide. The Webb brothers appeared alongside the likes of Lisa Edwards who later went on to be one of John Farnham's backing singers. In addition, the Webb brothers performed as one of the support acts for Farnham during an Australia Day concert at Memorial Drive in 1973.

Their performances also included a number of "live" appearances on local radio stations.

The Webb brothers formed the band Web in the late 1970s, performing at various Adelaide venues, eventually recording a number of their original songs at the ABC studios in Collinswood, showcasing their talent on ABC radio.

Webb went on to play in numerous bands and cover acts in the Adelaide area including Stiletto, the Michael Hunter Band, No Moving Parts and The Works.

He currently plays solo gigs in the Adelaide area at weddings, in hotels and wineries and private parties on a part-time basis.

== Marriage and children ==
Webb married Chrys (Christine Ann Webb) in 1976 and had their first child Lauren in 1979. Webb's love of music led him to name their first son, Marc, born in November 1980, after T-Rex front man Marc Bolan. They later had their second son Luke in 1985.

== Conversion to Christianity ==
Webb and his brother Keith (who had since moved to Queensland) eventually began working on a Rock Opera based on the prophecies of Nostradamus. It was during research for this project that Webb first became a Christian, initially worshiping at the Noarlunga Corps Salvation Army in Morphett Vale.

Webb and his family moved to Berri, South Australia in 1994, where they started a small home fellowship group that eventually became Riverland Shekinah, and in a later name change, Riverland Central Christian Church, a member of the Apostolic Church in Australia. It was here that Webb once again began singing and playing guitar as both Pastor and worship leader for the church. Later, Webb was officially ordained as a minister of religion in the Apostolic Church. The church initially met in Berri but eventually moved to Glossop, South Australia.

After his time in Riverland Central, Webb became the National Church Planting Director for the Apostolic Church, which included the beginning of churches across Australia. This included a church plant in Gerard, an Australian Aboriginal mission in South Australia, and a church and orphanage in Kerala India. Webb later passed on the role for "church planter" to become the state leader of the Apostolic Church for South Australia and the Northern Territory.

In 2006, Webb and his wife Chrys returned to Adelaide to take over Gateway Community Church in Morphett Vale, but remained the Senior Pastors for Riverland Central until the leadership was passed on to Pastors David and Joella Crossfield in January 2007.
