= Plucka Duck =

Australian television character

Plucka Duck is a character on the popular Australian television program Hey Hey It's Saturday. The character "presented" a segment on the show, along with Daryl Somers, which was a self-titled segment of Plucka Duck. Plucka was on the show until the show ended in 1999. In 2009, Plucka returned to the show when it returned to the screens as "Reunion Specials". In 2010, the show returned as a series, with Plucka appearing in every episode.

According to an interview given by John Blackman in 2009, Plucka was originally played by Mark McGahan, but was replaced by "Sim" for the reunion specials. "Sim" appears to refer to Simon Lefebvre.

In 1994, Plucka Duck took part in a Celebrity Motor race, featuring identical Holden Calibras, at Adelaide, ahead of the Australian Grand Prix.

In 1997, Plucka Duck had its own show, Plucka's Place. This show aired in 1997, with Livinia Nixon and Daniel Kowalski as co-hosts. The show lasted one season.

In 2005, Plucka appeared with Daryl Somers at Carols by Candlelight.

In 2008, Plucka made a long-awaited return to television. Plucka (along with Dickie Knee and Daryl Somers) did a skit at the Logies.

In early 2016, Plucka Duck appeared in an ad campaign for KFC riding a skateboard down a mountainous road in New Zealand.

== Awards ==
Plucka Duck was nominated in 1997 for the Most Popular Comedy Personality at the Logies.
