= Ernest Carroll =

Ernest Carroll may refer to:

- Ernest Carroll Moore (1871–1955), American educator
- Ernie Carroll (1929–2022), Australian puppeteer and entertainer
