= Family Feud (1978 Australian game show) =

- Genre: Game show
- Based on: Family Feud by Mark Goodson
- Presented by: Tony Barber; Daryl Somers; Sandy Scott; Rob Brough; John Deeks
- Announcer: John Blackman; Mark Malone
- Theme music composer: Rick Turk (1990–1996)
- Country of origin: Australia
- Original language: English

Production
- Production locations: Melbourne, Victoria (1978–1984); Brisbane, Queensland (1990–1996)
- Running time: 30 minutes

Original release
- Network: Nine Network
- Release: 20 February 1978 – 30 March 1984
- Network: Seven Network
- Release: 1990 – 28 June 1996

Related
- Bert's Family Feud; Family Feud (2014); Family Feud (U.S.)

Family Feud is an Australian game show based on the American show of the same name. The program ran on the Nine Network from 1978 to 1984, and on the Seven Network from 1990 to 1996. The program has been revived twice, in 2006 and 2014.

== Gameplay ==
Two families compete, with four members on each team. A host asks representatives of the family questions that have already been answered by a survey of 100 people. Teams score points for correct answers. An answer is considered correct if it is one of the concealed answers on the game board, or judged to be equivalent. More points are given for answers that have been given by more people in the survey (one point per person). Answers must have been given by at least two of the 100 people in order to be included on the board.

Examples of questions might be "Name a famous George", "Tell me a popular family vacation spot", "Name something you do at school", or "Name a slang name for policemen". At least two people among the survey respondents must give an answer for it to appear as one of the possibilities.

The participants are not asked questions about what is true or how things really are. Instead, they are asked questions about what other people think is true. As such, a perfectly logical answer may be considered incorrect because it failed to make the survey (e.g.: for the question about Georges, George Jones was a popular country singer, but if his name was not given by at least two people it would be considered wrong).

=== Basics ===
Two opposing family members "face off" to see which family will gain control of that particular question. Sometimes, the host will read the question only once in the entire round if time is short. Traditionally, they greet each other with a handshake before the question is read. Whoever guesses the more popular answer in the survey has the option to play the question or pass it to the other family. If neither player gives a valid answer, the next member of each family gets a chance to answer, with control again going to the family giving the more popular answer. If both answers are worth the same number of points, control goes to the player that buzzed in first.

The family in control can keep the question in which the family attempts to give all the remaining answers on the board, or pass to the other family. Starting with the next family member in line, each gets a chance to give one answer. Family members may not confer with one another while in control of the board. The family gets a "strike" if a player gives an answer that is not on the board or fails to respond. There is no firm time limit, but the host has the discretion to impose a three-second count if time is short or the contestant appears to be stalling. Three strikes cause the family to relinquish control of the board, giving the other family one chance to steal the points in the bank by correctly guessing one of the remaining answers.

In the 1978–1984 version, the entire family could confer before the answer was given. In the 1990–1996 version, each family member gave his or her opinion one at a time. The head of household could then either select one of those three or give his or her own. If the family guesses a remaining answer correctly, they receive the points accumulated by the other family.

After determining who takes the bank for a round, any remaining answers are then revealed. Per tradition, the audience yells each unrevealed answer in a choral response.

Three questions were played with the first two for single points and the third and final question for double. The first team to reach 200 points after the final question won the game. If, after the third round, neither team reached 200 points, further rounds (referred to as "spare" games in the 1990s version) would be played, for double points, until one team reached 200.

=== Major Round ===
The winning family chooses two family members to play the round. One family member leaves the stage and is placed in an isolation booth, while the other is given 15 seconds (extends to 20) to answer five questions. The clock begins counting down after the host finishes reading the first question. If he or she cannot think up an answer to a question, he or she may pass. A contestant may revisit a passed question at the end if time permits. If time runs out and all the questions have not been asked yet, they will still be in play as long as they have not been passed. The number of people giving each answer is revealed once all five answers are given or time has expired, whichever comes first. The player earns one point for each person that gave the same answer; at least two people must have given that answer for it to score. When revealing the number of people giving the same response, it is most commonly revealed with the phrase, "(The) Survey said!"

Once all the points for the first player are tallied, the second family member comes back on stage with the first contestant's answers covered and is given 20 seconds (extended to 25) to answer the same five questions. If the second player gives the same answer as the first player on a question, a double buzzer will sound, and the host will ask for another response.

If one or both family members accumulate a total of 200 points or more, the family wins the top prize:

- 1978–1984: Prize package worth $8,000.
- 1990–1996: Prize package worth over $7,000 & a cash jackpot starting at $2,000 and increasing by $1,000 until won.

Championship families stayed for up to a maximum of five nights. In 1994, five-night winners won $5,000 in gold bullion and shared with a home viewer a bonus jackpot worth $50,000 which increased $1,000 per night. By 1995, the jackpot was replaced by a family trip for winning six consecutive nights.

On celebrity episodes, the winning team played for $10,000 for the team's favorite charity. Failure to win donated $10 per point.

== Production and broadcast ==
The original Australian run of Family Feud was produced for the Nine Network, recorded at GTV-9's Melbourne studios in Bendigo Street, Richmond. It debuted on TCN-9 Sydney on Monday 20 February 1978, stripped Monday to Friday at 5pm, with Tony Barber as host. From Monday 6 November it was moved to 5:30pm. Continuing to air without a break over the 1978-79 Christmas/summer season, Family Feud was moved temporarily into The Young Doctors' 6pm timeslot from Monday 27 November, before settling back into a Monday-Friday 5:30pm schedule on Monday 5 February 1979. The season ended on Friday 16 November.

The show's third season commenced on Monday 11 February 1980, continuing to be stripped in the Monday-Friday 5:30pm slot. Tony Barber's last episode as host aired on Friday 11 July, moving on to host Sale of the Century. Daryl Somers took over as host, with his first episode airing the following Monday, 14 July. Family Feud's third season ended on Friday 14 November.

The program continued in the same timeslot from Monday 16 February 1981, with the fourth season ending on Friday 13 November.

Season 5 debuted on Monday 8 February 1982, again in the same timeslot, until Thursday 11 November.

Season 6 commenced at 5:30pm on Monday 7 February 1983, ending on Thursday 10 November, Daryl Somers' final episode as host.

The final season of Family Feud's original run commenced on Monday 13 February 1984, with Sandy Scott as new host. It was moved to 5pm from Monday 5 March, through until the show's final episode on the network on Friday 30 March 1984.

It was then revived by the Seven Network in 1990 hosted by Rob Brough until John Deeks took over the role on 29 January 1996 until its final episode on 28 June 1996.

== Merchandise ==
A board game where the set was based on the Ray Combs version from America was released by Croner in 1990. The same artwork was also released for the American version by Pressman Toy Corporation that same year.
