= Rob Brough =

Australian journalist

Robert Edward Brough (born 1955) is an Australian journalist, television presenter and rugby league coach.

== Media career ==
=== Radio ===
Brough began his media career in radio in the 1970s as an announcer at radio station 4VL in Charleville, Queensland. He then moved onto 4WK in Warwick, 4BC in Brisbane and then 4GG on the Gold Coast, Queensland.

=== Sports Journalism ===
Following on from his radio work, Brough moved into television in the mid 1980s, covering sport for ABC Television in Brisbane before moving over to Channel 9 to present the sports news on National Nine News in Brisbane until 1989.

=== Family Feud ===
In 1990, Brough moved away from news reporting when he joined the Channel 7 in Brisbane to host the Australian version of Family Feud, which was seen nationally. Brough hosted the program until 1995 when John Deeks took over until its axing the following year. Bert Newton and Grant Denyer have both hosted revived versions of the program for the Nine Network and Network Ten respectively.

In an opinion piece written for the Sydney Morning Herald, Dominic Knight claimed Bert's Family Feud, the 2006 version of the program, was an awful show but not just because it brought back "unpleasant memories of Rob Brough".

Brough was often parodied by Steve Vizard on Seven's sketch comedy show Fast Forward.

=== Seven News ===
Following his job as the host of Family Feud, Brough moved back into news for Seven's regional Queensland affiliate Sunshine Television on the Sunshine Coast. Shortly after Brough joined, Sunshine Television News became Seven News following the purchase of Sunshine Television by Seven and as such, the network's name and look changed to reflect the metropolitan Channel 7 stations.

Initially, Brough presented the local Sunshine Coast edition of Seven News and pre-recorded two additional bulletins for the Wide Bay-Burnett region and the Mackay region. He then presented seven separate local editions of Seven News each weeknight from the network's Sunshine Coast studio, which all aired simultaneously across the individual regions at 6pm each weeknight on Channel 7, and then repeated at 6:30pm on 7two.

Brough was joined by Joanne Desmond as a co-presenter on the Cairns, Townsville, Central Queensland and Darling Downs editions of Seven News, and he presented the Mackay, Wide Bay and Sunshine Coast editions by himself.

In 2015, Brough fronted a campaign launched by Seven Queensland in response to the "Save Our Voices" campaign, which was a joint promotion between WIN Television, Southern Cross Austereo and Seven aimed at encouraging viewers to lobby the Federal Government to relax media ownership laws. The "Leave TV Laws Alone" spot that Seven Queensland ran in commercial breaks featured Brough in the Seven Local News studio claiming Seven Queensland spends more on local news than their competitors. A voice-over that follows states that Seven Queensland doesn't support the bullying by the other networks and said that viewers shouldn't be used as pawns.

Brough has said that his work in the media has been influenced by television presenters Mike Walsh and Mike Willesee.

After a period of extended personal leave, it was confirmed on 29 December 2025 that Brough had departed Seven News Regional Queensland. Brough had been with the station for almost 20 years, with his last bulletin being presented in 2024.

=== The Coolangatta Gold ===
While working at Gold Coast radio station 4GG, Brough made an appearance in the 1984 Australian film, The Coolangatta Gold starring Joss McWilliam and Colin Friels. The movie is about the annual Gold Coast sports event with the same name. A close-up of Brough standing on the beach is seen in the movie as he plays the role of a roving sports reporter, previewing the event while holding a 4GG microphone.

Brough has said it was Michael Edgley, whose production company Hoyts Edgley produced The Coolangatta Gold, who suggested and encouraged a move from radio to television.

== Rugby League ==
Brough is also a rugby league coach and is currently the head coach of the Kawana Dolphins, a team that plays in the Sunshine Coast–Gympie rugby league competition, as part of the larger Central Division of Queensland Rugby League.

Brough began coaching on the Sunshine Coast after earning a reputation as a skilled coach after establishing Mountain Creek State High School's "Rugby League School of Excellence" and coaching junior sides. In 2005, after Brough ran a one-off pre-season session with the Kawana Dolphins' senior team, the club asked him to consider coaching the team permanently. Brough accepted the job and began coaching the Dolphins A-grade side.

In 2013, he faced some criticism for not seeming to have a positive attitude towards his team despite the team's above-average performance during the season.

In 2016, Brough's Kawana Dolphins narrowly missed out on claiming victory over the Maroochydore Swans in the grand final, losing the game 18–14. Brough said Maroochydore played some fast footy which put Kawana on the back foot, and unable to catch up.

Brough has always had an interest in rugby league. In a 1994 interview, Brough said he had always wanted to go to Sydney to play rugby league as he had always wanted to play for the St. George Dragons. However, Brough did play some grade football in Brisbane, with Easts. Brough claims he got his love of rugby league from his grandfather who took him to the Brisbane grand final between Redcliffe (captained by Arthur Beetson) and Norths in 1965.

In 2026, Brough's son Tyson made his debut as a National Rugby League referee, having already refereed in the Queensland Cup since 2014.

== Personal life ==
Brough and his brother Mal grew up at Slacks Creek in a little fibro house.(Fibro is a colloquial Australian term for fibre cement) Their father grew vegetables which he sold to support the family, but due to being crippled by poliomyelitis, he had to slide around his vegetable garden on his backside while tending to it.

Rob Brough's son Sam died on his third birthday in 1989, after suffering from health issues. Brough has two other children Jess and Tyson.

In 2014, Brough attempted a 1,200 kilometre charity bike ride from Sydney to Brisbane. "Rob's Ride for Kids" was an attempt to raise money for the Children's Hospital Foundation in memory of his son Sam, who died 25 years prior. Due to illness, Brough pulled out of the ride without completing it but still managed to raise $16,000 for the charity.

Brough's brother Mal Brough was a Federal Member of Parliament from 1996 until 2016. Due to his brother's involvement in politics, Brough has had to introduce numerous local news stories about his brother, including those that have detailed controversies such as Mal Brough's involvement in the James Ashby affair.

Brough took extended personal leave from Seven News in 2024 to take care of his daughter who was diagnosed with multiple aggressive forms of cancer. Brough would ultimately not return to his role at Seven.
