= The Daryl and Ossie Show =

- Genre: Comedy Game Show
- Presented by: Daryl Somers
- Country of origin: Australia
- Original language: English
- No. of seasons: 1
- No. of episodes: 40

Production
- Running time: 30 minutes
- Production company: Reg Grundy Productions

Original release
- Network: The 0-10 Network
- Release: 11 September – 3 November 1978

Related
- Hey Hey It's Saturday

The Daryl and Ossie Show was a short-lived Australian comedy game show, which aired on Melbourne's Channel 0 in 1978. It was hosted by Daryl Somers, Ossie Ostrich (a puppet operated by Ernie Carroll), model Monique Daams and actor and comedian Betty Bobbitt. Like Blankety Blanks, the show it was created to replace, The Daryl and Ossie Show was a Reg Grundy production.

After five years of presenting the Saturday morning children's show Hey Hey It's Saturday, Somers and Carroll did not return with the show in 1978. Instead, they produced one, one-hour evening show The Daryl and Ossie Special which aired on Wednesday, 10 May at 7:30. The special also starred Chelsea Brown, The Echoes and 'psychic phenomena expert' Kevin Arnett. Reportage at the time suggested the show was 'rushed' into the Channel 9 schedule 'as part of a savage reaction to recent ratings defeats'. Program manager for Channel 9, Jim Masterson, told TV Week that the channel's strategy was to 'do about six or eight specials a year' featuring the pair.

Somers and Carroll left Nine when offered a show by the 0-10 Network to replace Graham Kennedy's Blankety Blanks. The Daryl and Ossie Show was, readers of TV Week were told, 'based on Englishman Bruce Forsyth's Generation Game which is Number One in the ratings charts [in the UK]'. The show ran only in Melbourne, where (journalist Christine Hogan wrote) 'it was launched with as much panache as Channel 0 in Melbourne could muster'; however, she added, it was soon 'languishing... with terrible ratings'. Despite an announcement that it would come to Sydney screens on 11 September, The Daryl and Ossie Show was never to be screened outside Melbourne.

In early October 1978, the Melbourne Age's television writer Brian Curtis told his readers:

Channel O's disappointing Daryl and Ossie Show is to be dropped from its daily 7pm time slot after November 3. The show will be restructured, I understand, and a one-hour edition will be screened at 6:30 pm on Sundays next year.

He added:

Daryl Somers, who moved with partner Ernie (Ossie) Carroll from Channel 9 to break into night-time variety TV, said yesterday he had not heard of the change but would not be disappointed with it. "It's very hard to keep up the standard with a show that comes out every day... Frankly, both Ernie and I are exhausted at the moment."

As it transpired, the show was cancelled before the end of the year. Somers and Carroll returned to Nine and Hey Hey It's Saturday in 1979.

In a story on Somers for the Sydney Morning Herald in 1992, journalist Paul Daley referred to a 'short and unsuccessful stint with Channel 0' and added that 'Curiously, there is no mention of Channel 0 on [Somers'] curriculum vitae.'

Nine episodes of The Daryl and Ossie Show are held in the National Film and Sound Archive.
