= Pointless (Australian game show) =

Australian TV series

- Genre: Game show
- Presented by: Mark Humphries
- Starring: Andrew Rochford
- Theme music composer: Marc Sylvan
- Country of origin: Australia
- Original language: English
- No. of seasons: 2
- No. of episodes: 184

Production
- Production locations: Sydney, New South Wales
- Running time: 22 minutes (excluding commercials)
- Production company: Endemol Shine Australia

Original release
- Network: Network 10
- Release: 23 July 2018 – 10 May 2019

Pointless was an Australian television quiz show based on the British program of the same name. It was broadcast by Network 10 and hosted by Mark Humphries.

It began airing from 23 July 2018 until 10 May 2019. Pointless was filmed at Network 10 Studios in Pyrmont, a suburb in Sydney's inner-city.

== History ==
In May 2018, Endemol Shine Australia were looking for local contestants from New South Wales to audition for Pointless. It was confirmed that the Nine Network, Seven Network, ABC, SBS and Foxtel had not purchased the rights to the show, leaving Network 10 as the likely broadcaster.

In late June it was announced that an Australian version of Pointless would air on Network 10, replacing Family Feud.

In February 2019, various entertainment websites speculated that the show had been cancelled due to poor ratings, and that a replacement was yet to be announced. On 15 March 2019, Network 10 confirmed that Pointless was cancelled, to be replaced with a new game show, Celebrity Name Game, hosted by Grant Denyer, and based on the American game show of the same name. This lasted until May 2020.

== Gameplay ==
The format of the show is similar in nature to the British version albeit with reduced and abbreviated rounds and fewer contestants.

The object of the game is for contestants to provide answers that are not only correct but also as obscure as possible, with each game consisting of teams of two contestants. The Australian version commences with three teams compared to the four teams that participate in the British game. Before each show, 100 people are given 100 seconds to provide as many answers as they can to a series of general knowledge questions as part of a pre-conducted survey, and in each round, contestants are asked these same questions. These questions are set into categories, with the contestants given rules regarding what they are searching for in terms of answers, more importantly what answers will be accepted for the question given. If the answer is correct, the team scores one point for each participant that gave it during the survey; if none of the surveyed participants gave an answer listed for the question and a contestant gives it, the team scores zero points for providing a "pointless" answer. If the answer is incorrect, the team scores the maximum of 100 points.

The format of the show consists of an elimination round in which teams must achieve as low a score as possible, with those who achieve the highest score being eliminated from the game. Following this round, the two surviving teams compete against each other in a "head to head" round to find the lowest scoring answer in a series of questions, with the winning team moving on to the final round. Prior to the final round, every pointless answer given adds $500 to the cash jackpot, and eliminated teams making their first appearance are eligible to appear again in the next consecutive game. Teams who have appeared twice or reached the final round cannot return. The team that reaches the final round is awarded a trophy to keep, and then must supply two answers from one of two nominated categories in 30 seconds (as opposed to three answers from one of three nominated categories in 60 seconds in the British game) to a question, in which one must be a pointless answer in order to win the jackpot as it stands for that game; otherwise, the money rolls over to the next show.

The cash jackpot begins at $2000 at the start of its run. Should it not be won at the end of a game, the amount (including any increases from pointless answers) is rolled over to the next game and increased by $2000, offering returning and new contestants a chance of winning a bigger cash prize. To date, the highest recorded jackpot won on the show was $24,000 on 20 September 2018. Once the jackpot is won, the amount is reset to $2000.

== Series overview ==
Series	Episodes	Originally released	
Series	Episodes	First released	Last released
1	110	23 July 2018	21 December 2018
2	53	14 January 2019	10 May 2019
