= The Music Men =

Australian musical comedy act

- Origin: Melbourne, Australia
- Genre: Comedy music
- Years active: 1988–present
- Website: themusicmen.com.au

The Music Men (also styled as The Musicmen) are an Australian musical comedy act based in Melbourne. The original group consisted of ten British expatriate soccer players, including founder David Brooks. The act continued releasing music in 2026.

They first appeared on Australian television performing "I Am the Music Man" on the Red Faces segment of Hey Hey It's Saturday in 1988.

== History ==
=== Formation ===
David Brooks was born and raised in Bury in north-west England, where he began his football career with Bury F.C. He later played for several non-League clubs in the region. By February 1981, while playing for Rossendale United, he had accepted a three-year contract with Melbourne club Ringwood City. He arrived in Australia in 1981. In a 2013 profile, Karl Quinn reported that Brooks had played for Bury against a Manchester United reserve side featuring Bobby Charlton.

=== Early recordings and performances ===
By late 1993, the act consisted of Brooks, Paul Harris, Martin Woodall, Peter Cocker, Dean Hennessy, Joe Sweeney, Sean Lane, Joe Carroll, Mike Hanley and Phil Griffin.

In 1993, Saatchi & Saatchi approached the group to appear in a Tooheys Gold television commercial. The band’s account states that, following the advertisement, Michael Gudinski approached them to record an album with Red Symons as producer. The act recorded What Can You Play?

The album What Can You Play? was released in November 1993 and peaked at number 74 on the Australian albums chart. Reviewing it for The Age, John Mangan criticised the thin electronic backing while noting the enthusiasm of the vocals.

The group released "Ablett's in the Air" in September 1995. The song was set to the tune of "Love Is in the Air". The single peaked at number 41 nationally. It was at number 10 on ARIA's Victoria and Tasmania regional chart dated 8 October 1995.

=== Sporting performances ===
The band's archived history records a performance with Mike Brady at the AFL Centenary Ball at the Melbourne Cricket Ground on 16 April 1996. The programme comprised the theme songs of the sixteen AFL clubs. Its booking profile also lists basketball, rugby and cricket ground entertainment among its performances.

=== Cricket related work ===
Brooks and Greg Champion co-wrote "They Whinge Away", a parody of "The Lion Sleeps Tonight". Champion performed the song during a tea interval at the opening 2006–07 Ashes Test at The Gabba. Queensland Cricket chief executive Graham Dixon apologised for its portrayal of England supporters and said it would not be performed again. Barmy Army founder Paul Burnham questioned the need for an apology and called for more banter.

Champion and Brooks also collaborated on Songs for Singing at Cricket Matches, a collection of six cricket chants announced on Champion’s website. The announcement credits the songs to Greg and Angela Champion and lists contributions including "We Are Young and Free" and "We Had Dennis Lillee".

=== Later performances and membership ===
The act also performed as the duo Brooksy'n Cal, with Brooks and Steve “Cal”. Their repertoire included songs, sketches and parodies of public figures.

Royal Brighton Yacht Club advertised the Musicmen for its Comedy Carnival on 10 June 2022, with Brooksy as host. The announced lineup also included Dave Hughes, Adam Rozenbachs and Annie Louey.

In May 2024, the group listed Brooks, Phil Griffin, Paul Harris, Dean Hennessey, Joe Carroll and Alan Bennett among its remaining original members. The same announcement reported that members Micky Hanley and Andy Higgins had died.

=== Later releases ===
The group released "Those Were the Days" in October 2021 and "Merry Xmas Everybody" the following month. These were followed by "Not Dead Yet" in 2022.

The 2023 releases included "The Baggy Green", "Howzat", "We Dont Want the Pommies to Win" and "Icebergers". "I'm a Lad from Bury" was released on 27 June 2023. In its announcement the following month, the band described the song as a tribute to Brooks's hometown and Bury Football Club and credited Trevor Carter as its writer and producer.

In 2024, they released "Ange Ball", a reworking of the Choirboys' "Run to Paradise" as a tribute to Ange Postecoglou. Further singles included "Get Off the Bloody Phone" in 2025, "Socceroos" in June 2026 and "Ange Postecoglou" in 2026.

== David Brooks ==
=== Swimming and community activities ===
Brooks joined the Brighton Icebergers, a group of cold-water swimmers. In 2013, The Sydney Morning Herald described his training with long-distance swimmer John van Wisse for the 2012 Lorne Pier to Pub swim.

In July 2024, Royal Brighton Yacht Club's report on its Iceberger Winter Swimming Festival credited Brooks with recording the morning's activities.

=== Documentary work ===
Brooks's swimming became the subject of An Iceberger with the Lot: From Bury to Brighton. In August 2013, The Sydney Morning Herald reported that the film was scheduled to open the Bayside Film Festival at Palace Brighton Bay. The film followed Brooks's experience with the swimmers and his training for the 2012 Lorne Pier to Pub swim.

Fred Media's 2022 programme catalogue lists Icebergers, a documentary about Brooks and the Brighton swimmers, with a production credit to David E Brooks. The catalogue describes a 60-minute programme and labels it 2016.

Brooks also made Crossing the Line, a film about John van Wisse's 2014 Enduroman journey from London to Paris. Van Wisse's August 2017 media release credits Brooks and links viewers to the film.

Brooks's subsequent documentary work includes Winter Wellness Warriors, about the Middle Brighton Baths swimming community during winter 2025. The filmmaker's FilmFreeway listing credits Brooks as director and producer and names him and Jo Gibbs as writers. It gives a completion date of 30 January 2026 and a running time of 38 minutes 11 seconds.

== Discography ==
=== Albums ===
Title	Release information	Australian peak
What Can You Play?	November 1993	74
How-Is-EEE	Cricket album listed in the band's history	–
Straight to the Top	Listed as a 1998 AFL CD in the band's history	–

=== Singles ===
Selected singles, with Australian chart positions
Title	Year	Peak chart position AUS
"I Am a Football Fan"	1993	–
"Ablett's in the Air"	1995	41
"Those Were the Days"	2021	–
"Merry Xmas Everybody"	2021	–
"Not Dead Yet"	2022	–
"The Baggy Green"	2023	–
"Howzat"	2023	–
"We Dont Want the Pommies to Win"	2023	–
"I'm a Lad from Bury"	2023	–
"Icebergers"	2023	–
"Ange Ball"	2024	–
"Get Off the Bloody Phone"	2025	–
"Socceroos"	2026	–
"Ange Postecoglou"	2026	–

Regional chart: "Ablett’s in the Air" was number 10 in Victoria and Tasmania on 8 October 1995.

A dash indicates that no Australian chart position is listed in the sources cited here.
