= Global Television (Australia) =

Coordinates: 33.89202°S 151.22851°E

General information
- Status: Completed
- Type: film & television studios Complex
- Location: Victoria: Coventry Street, Southbank; Hawthorn Road, Vermont South; New South Wales: Eveleigh
- Completed: 1956 (Southbank, Victoria); 1964 (Vermont South, Victoria); 2010 (Eveleigh, New South Wales)

Global Television is a large television production company with studios in Australia's two largest cities Sydney and Melbourne. It was co-founded in 1988 by Bruce Fink. They have been responsible for handling the technical side of most top live sport and entertainment events produced and broadcast in Australia.

Global Television's Sydney studios are located at South Eveleigh in the inner city suburb of Eveleigh. The new studios were built in 2010, and produce a large number of Australian programmes from its two studios.

Global Television's Melbourne studios are located in the inner suburb of South Melbourne and occupy the previous existing HSV-7 Studios. The four open studios are home to such shows as Dancing with the Stars, The Chase Australia, My Kitchen Rules, Family Feud, Fox Footy and Taskmaster.

Global Television also occupied the former ATV-10 Studios in the outer suburb of Nunawading where Neighbours is produced at Forest Hill for a number of years, this is now operated by FremantleMedia.

== Acquired ==
In January 2014, NEP Group acquired Global Television for an undisclosed amount from Catalyst Investments and Global Television is now completely part of the NEP worldwide network. NEP also acquired Harry Michaels' Silk Studios (formerly zerO1zerO) in the same year, reducing the number of competing outside broadcasting and studio production hire facilities.
