= Russell Gilbert =

Australian comedian

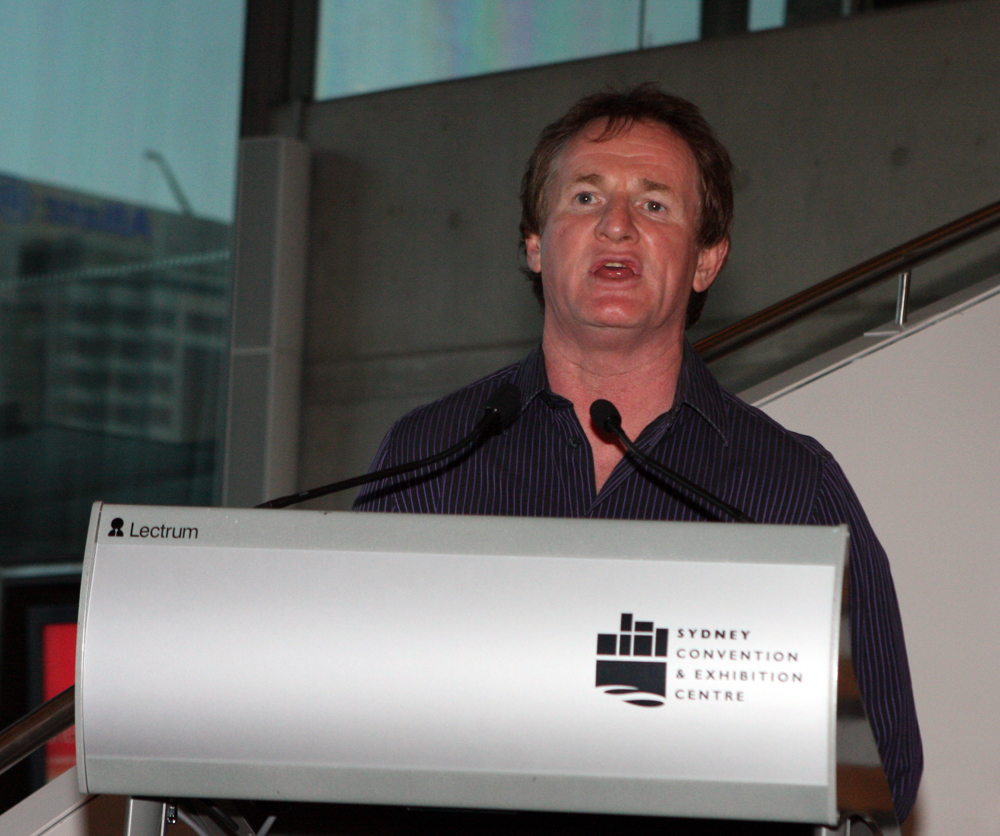
- Russell Gilbert at Sexpo Sydney in March 2013
- Born: 17 October 1959 (age 67); Footscray, Victoria, Australia
- Notable work: The Comedy Company; Hey Hey It's Saturday; The Russell Gilbert Show
- Partner: Rochelle Nolan (1996–2015)

Comedy career
- Years active: 1986–2015
- Medium: Comedian, television and radio presenter, actor
- Genre: Comedy

Russell Gilbert (born 17 October 1959) is an Australian comedian from Footscray, Victoria, best known for his television appearances on programs such as The Comedy Company, Hey Hey It's Saturday and The Russell Gilbert Show; he was also a radio presenter and a live stage and film actor.

In 2015, Gilbert suffered a stroke during surgery to treat a brain aneurysm. Since then he has mostly receded from public life.

== Career ==
=== Television ===
Gilbert has appeared in several Australian TV comedies, first attracting notice as "Russ the Postie" on Network 10's The Comedy Company (1988–89). This role led him to a nine-year stint on the Nine Network's Hey Hey It's Saturday (1990–1999). Gilbert also played Kev the tow-truck driver in the sitcom Bingles (1992). In the late 1990s, he began starring in his own shows made at Nine, all of which were short-lived—even though they all rated well: The Russell Gilbert Show (1998), a sketch comedy show; Russell Gilbert Live (2000), a Saturday-evening variety show featuring celebrity interviews as well as live and sketch comedy; and Russell Gilbert Was Here! (2001), another sketch series.

In 2003, Gilbert hosted the game show Bark-Off with Livinia Nixon. During the 2000s, Gilbert also made guest appearances on the cult Channel 31 Melbourne sketch comedy show The Shambles and the comedy program Thank God You're Here, and hosted Great Comedy Classics, a compilation of popular British sitcoms, including Some Mothers Do 'Ave 'Em and Are You Being Served? for the Seven Network. In May 2007, Gilbert appeared as one of the celebrity performers on the second season of Seven's celebrity reality singing competition It Takes Two. He also worked as a writer on the Network Ten sketch series The Wedge.

In 1995 and 1996, Gilbert was nominated for a Logie for the Most Popular Comedy Personality for his work on Hey Hey It's Saturday.

In March 2023, a two-part best-of compilation from The Russell Gilbert Show was put on the air to help raise funds for Gilbert.

=== Film ===
Gilbert has acted in four Australian films: Nirvana Street Murder (1990); Ned Kelly (2003), playing Constable Hall; The Extra (2005); and Housos vs. Authority (2012). He also appeared unbilled in the Jason Donovan telemovie Loot (2004).

=== Radio ===
In 2004, Gilbert ventured into radio as co-host of Weekend Leave Pass on SEN 1116 with Mark Fine.

== Personal life ==
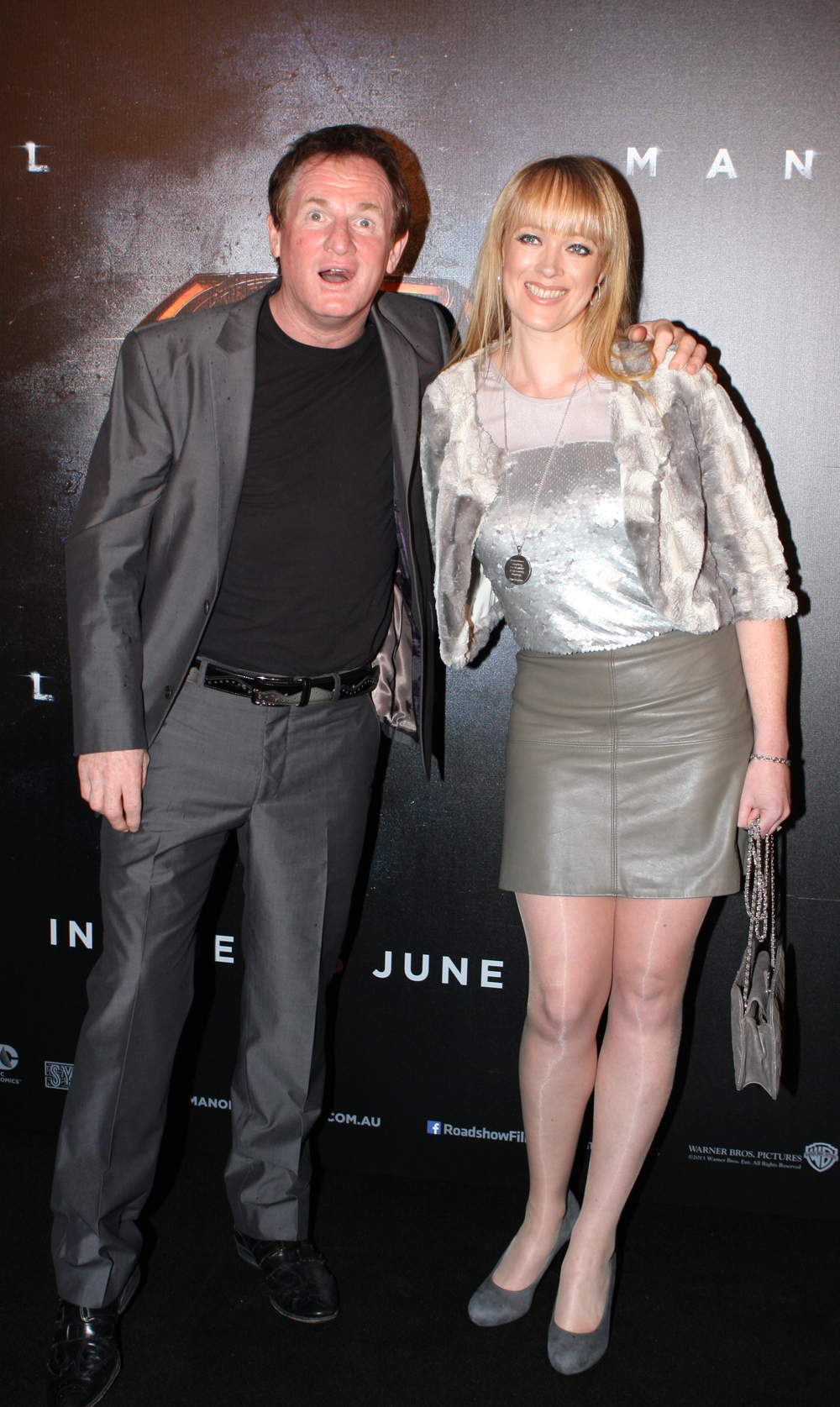
Russell Gilbert and Rochelle Nolan (2013)

Gilbert is a passionate supporter of the AFL club Western Bulldogs and has made several appearances at the E. J. Whitten Legends Game. In 2002, he kicked a goal while on the bench at one such game. In 2010, Gilbert kicked a goal in the third quarter and then another in the fourth. As a running gag during these games, Gilbert is notorious for ripping off his guernsey in the final minutes of the game while in possession of the ball deep in defence. Underneath, his opponent team's guernsey would be revealed, kicking a goal for the team for which he had changed allegiance to.

Gilbert was in a relationship with television producer Rochelle Nolan from 1996 until her suicide in September 2015.

Two weeks after Nolan's death, Gilbert was diagnosed with a brain aneurysm. He later suffered a stroke while undergoing surgery to treat the aneurysm which impacted his ability to speak and left him unable to work; his rehabilitation included weekly treatments to help improve his speech and memory. In July 2016, Gilbert attended a gala comedy event held to raise funds for his ongoing rehabilitation and care, and in 2017 he released a music video for a song called "Tinderella" which was originally recorded and filmed in 2015. However, since then, Gilbert has mostly receded from public life.
