= Andrew Fyfe (cartoonist) =

Australian cartoonist

- Born: 12 May 1966 (age 60); Melbourne, Victoria, Australia
- Occupations: Cartoonist; satirist; television host; producer
- Years active: 1985−present

Andrew Fyfe (born 12 May 1966) is an Australian cartoonist and satirist.

== Career ==
Fyfe is best known for his role as the cartoonist on Australia's longest running variety show, Hey Hey It's Saturday, where he would instantly satirize situations that occurred live on air with lightning quick cartoons drawn with his "pen cam". He performed this role from 1985, while still a teenager, until the show's run ended in 1999. He returned for the show's 2009 reunion specials, as well as the show's return in 2010.

Andrew has drawn in front of celebrities including Sophia Loren, Tony Bennett, Samuel L. Jackson, Clint Eastwood, Leslie Nielsen, Cliff Richard and Patrick Swayze.

In 1992-93, he hosted his own children's game show Guess What? with Alison Brahe (93) and Jaquie Rindt (94). On the show, two panels of children had to decipher the answers to Andrew's picture puzzles.

Andrew's work was also seen on Network Nine's The Footy Show between 1994 and 2004 where he produced an animated segment satirizing the news of the week. His political satiric animation has also appeared on A Current Affair.

Fyfe has worked with many of Australia's top publications, including Mad Magazine and TV Week; he has featured in advertising campaigns for Cadbury, Pilot Pens and Schweppes.

Between 2004 and 2005, he produced a series of animated shorts entitled Survive Alive for Foxtel's The Comedy Channel. In 2005, Andrew worked as political editorial cartoonist for The Sunday Telegraph and mX newspapers. He is also a regular on the public speaking circuit.

In 2014, Andrew was commissioned by Human Nature to design their backdrop for their Las Vegas Xmas show.

Andrew returned to The AFL Footy Show in 2016, animating the weekly "Footy Show Stakes" which satirised AFL football news of the week as seen in a wacky horse race. The year culminated in The Stakes opening the first six minutes of the Grand Final episode of The Footy Show televised live from the Rod Laver Arena.

Andrew's work can be seen on the 2017 season of the AFL Footy Show .
