= Family Feud (2014 Australian game show) =

Television series

- Genre: Game show
- Based on: Family Feud by Mark Goodson
- Presented by: Grant Denyer
- Country of origin: Australia
- Original language: English
- No. of episodes: 1,184

Production
- Executive producer: Pam Barnes
- Production locations: Melbourne, Victoria (2014–2017); Sydney, New South Wales (2018, 2020)
- Running time: 24–27 minutes (2014–2018); 50 minutes (2020)
- Production company: FremantleMedia Australia

Original release
- Network: Network Ten
- Release: 14 July 2014 – 22 July 2018
- Release: 16 August – 27 December 2020

Related
- Family Feud (1978–1984, 1988–1996); Bert's Family Feud (2006–2007); All Star Family Feud

Family Feud is an Australian game show based on the American show of the same name. It aired on Network Ten from 14 July 2014 until 22 July 2018 and in August 2020 for a special 10-episode series. The show was hosted by Grant Denyer. This was the fourth Australian version of the format, the previous incarnation being Bert's Family Feud hosted by Bert Newton in 2006. Ten became the third network to adapt the format. From 2016, Ten also screened a celebrity edition titled All Star Family Feud. The show was filmed at Global Television Studios in Southbank, Melbourne from 2014 to 2017 and at Network Ten Studios in Pyrmont, Sydney in 2018 & 2020.

Network Ten revived the series for a 12 episode prime-time special series, which premiered on Sunday, 16 August 2020, with contestants being the frontline workers who assisted in the 2019–2020 bushfire crisis & the COVID-19 pandemic and their families. The grand prize for the special series was increased to A$100,000.

== Gameplay ==
Representatives of the family are posed questions that have already been answered by 100 people. An answer is considered correct if it is one of the concealed answers on the game board, or judged to be equivalent. More points are given for answers that have been given by more people in the survey (one point per person). Answers must have been given by at least two of the 100 people in order to be included on the board. There are four members on each team.

Examples of questions might be "Name a famous George", "Tell me a popular family holiday spot", "Name something you do at school", or "Name a slang name for policemen". At least 1 people among the survey respondents must give an answer for it to appear as one of the possibilities. The participants are not asked questions about what is true or how things really are. Instead, they are asked questions about what other people think is true. As such, a perfectly logical answer may be considered incorrect because it failed to make the survey (e.g.: for the question about Georges, George Jones was a popular country singer, but if his name was not given by at least two people it would be considered wrong).

=== Game Basics ===
To start each round of the main game, two opposing family members "face-off" to see which family will gain control of that particular question. Traditionally, the contestants greet each other with a handshake before the question is read. Whoever guesses the more popular answer in the survey has the option to play the question or pass it to the other family.

Starting with the next family member in line, the family members take turns giving an answer to the host. Family members may not confer with one another while in control of the board. There is a time limit, with the host warning of a three-second count if time is short or the contestant appears to be stalling. An answer not on the board or a family member failing to provide an answer within the time limit results in a strike being charged to the family. When a family is able to reveal all the answers on the board before accumulating three strikes, they win the round.

When a family in control accumulates three strikes, control passes to the other family, who then has one chance to steal the points in the bank by correctly guessing one of the remaining unrevealed answers. The family is allowed to confer before coming up with an answer (before the third strike) and each family member gave his or her answer one at a time (after the third strike). The team captain could then select one of the three opinions or give his or her own. If the family guesses a remaining answer correctly, they receive the points accumulated by the other family, and the value of the revealed answer (used in the US from 1992 to 2003). If unsuccessful, the opponents keep the points they scored during the round before three strikes. After determining who takes the bank for a round, any remaining answers are then revealed. Per tradition, the audience yells each unrevealed answer in a choral response from lowest to highest.

=== Scoring ===
The first family to score 300 points or more wins the game and goes on to play the Fast Money round. There are four rounds in total, and game play is similar to the current US version, with the first two rounds being single points, the third being double points, and the fourth and subsequent rounds are worth triple points. As is the case in the US, a family must reach 300 points after four rounds, and the fifth and subsequent rounds are Sudden Death. Only the most popular answer is on the board, and the captains of each family participate. If a Sudden Death fails to put either family above the 300 point total, then subsequent players in line will play ensuing rounds until a family reaches 300 points.

As has been the case in the United States version since 2009, any family that wins five games retires as an undefeated family and wins a new car.

=== Fast Money ===
The winning family plays Fast Money and chooses two family members to participate in the round. One family member leaves the stage and is placed in a soundproof booth, while the other is given 20 seconds to answer five questions. The clock begins counting down after the host finishes reading the first question. If the contestant cannot think of an answer to a question, he or she may pass and revisit a passed question at the end if time permits. If time runs out and all the questions have not been asked yet, they will still be in play as long as they have not been passed. The number of people giving each answer is revealed once all five answers are given or time has expired, whichever comes first. The player earns one point for each person that gave the same answer; at least two people must have given that answer for it to score. When revealing the number of people giving the same response, it is most commonly revealed with the phrase, "The Survey says!", “What did our Survey say!” or "Survey says!".

Once all the points for the first player are tallied, the second family member comes back on stage with the first contestant's answers covered and is given 25 seconds to answer the same five questions. If the second player gives the same answer as the first player on a question, a double buzzer will sound and the host will ask for another response, usually by telling the contestant, "Try again." Each point awards the family $10 (e.g. scoring 148 points awards the family $1,480). If one or both family members accumulate a total of 200 points or more, the family wins $10,000.

Forty-six families won a car. One family won the maximum prize of $50,000 and a car.

== Production and broadcast ==
Airing in a 6:00 pm timeslot, Family Feud was originally broadcast five nights a week from Mondays to Fridays; an additional episode was added on Sundays from February 2015. The show was filmed at Global Television Studios in Southbank, Melbourne from 2014 to 2017 and at Network Ten's Studios in Pyrmont, Sydney in 2018.

Family Feud premiered simultaneously on Ten and its multichannels Eleven and One on 14 July 2014. The decision to simulcast the show on Eleven and One was to gain as much exposure as possible during the first week of broadcast. A combined audience of 690,000 viewers watched the first episode, while the second episode saw Family Feud's ratings rise to 719,000.

Following the decision to simulcast Family Feud, Ten requested ratings provider OzTAM merge its ratings across three channels as a combined figure, instead of releasing a breakdown of audience figures for each channel. Although the simulcast was originally scheduled for the first week only, Ten continued to simulcast the show across its three channels. Several media buyers and news websites criticised Ten's decision to merge the ratings. One media buyer told news website Mumbrella that "It looks like Ten are trying to pad the numbers when they should just be honest." Glenn Dyer of Crikey wrote that "it's not against the rules, but it is poor form" and believed that the move was "probably to try and boost the audience figures" for the show. Dyer also questioned whether Ten being "scared of failure" is the reason they are "afraid to separate the figures". Ten's chief of programming officer Beverly McGarvey responded to the criticism saying, "There is no 'padding' of numbers at all. That is ridiculous. We are simulcasting Family Feud across Ten, Eleven and One, and the OzTAM numbers show many people are watching the show." David Knox of TV Tonight added, "Ten appears to have painted itself into a corner. It has now run the simulcast for so many weeks that pens will be poised the minute it disappears and those numbers drop." Ten's chief programming officer Beverly McGarvey said in 2015 that there were no plans to end the simulcasting, saying "People engage with Family Feud and it works as a triple test. It's half an hour a day and we have no plans in the short term to make any changes there."

In January 2015 Ten announced that the show had given the network its biggest audience in the 6:00 pm weekday timeslot in more than five years. In an interview with TV Tonight, the Nine Network's head of programming Andrew Backwell felt that Ten were "getting a bit ahead of themselves" on calling Family Feud a ratings success in that timeslot as its ratings are derived from a simulcast on Ten, Eleven and One. He said, "It does half of what Channel Nine does in the slot and it's across three channels. If you look at the share in the slot, you wouldn't be touting it as a big success."

On 8 May 2018, it was announced that Ten had decided to axe Family Feud. The show was replaced in the timeslot by another game show, Pointless. Denyer was later announced to be hosting an Australian adaptation of the American game show Ellen's Game of Games for Ten, which was called Game of Games.

On 22 May 2020, Network Ten announced a revived Family Feud 10-part prime-time special series to give back to frontline workers which aired from Sunday, 16 August 2020. The maximum grand prize was increased from $50,000 to $100,000. No team won the $100,000 top prize during these ten episodes.

== Merchandise ==
=== Board Games ===
Three editions of the Family Feud board game were released by Imagination. There was also a Disney edition in 2016 and a Star Wars edition in 2017. A music edition was released on their official website in 2017.

=== Buzzer App ===
A Buzzer App was released in 2015.

=== Online Game ===
An online version of the show was released in 2014.

=== Word Hunt ===
A word search book was published by Bauer Books in 2015.

=== Lottery Ticket ===
A lottery ticket based on this version was released by Scientific Games in 2015.

== All Star Family Feud ==
All Star Family Feud was a spin off series which sees celebrities compete in teams to raise money for their chosen charity. The series first broadcast on 14 March 2016 and last broadcast on 6 May 2018.

== Podcast Version ==
On 14 July 2022, it was announced by ARN's iHeart Podcast Network Australia, the KIIS Network and Fremantle hosted by comedian, actor and TV Personality Peter Helliar. Following a similar format to the TV version, two celebrity guests (i.e. comedians, musicians, chefs and actors) plays two rounds of the show before going into a fast round to determine the winner. With a special theme for each episode, the contestant compete against the top 100 survey responses to win a prize on behalf of a listener. It premiered on 13 July 2022.

== Criticism ==
In October 2014, Family Feud came under fire from various media outlets for asking the question, "Name something people think is a woman's job." The correct answers included cooking, washing clothes, cleaning, and nursing. Many viewers branded the question as misogynistic. Network Ten later made an apology, stating that the question was "ill-advised" and should not have been included. Ten stated that the questions are picked out of an international database and that the questions are often "not reflective of all Australians". The show again caused controversy in January 2015 with the question, "What is something annoying a cyclist might do?" The question caused a mixed, mainly negative reception on social media. Australian Cycle Alliance president Edward Hore said he was "shocked by the question", continuing to state that "the hatred against cyclists has to stop" and that "everyone knows a cyclist."

== In popular culture ==
On an 18 October 2016 episode of the long-running soap opera Neighbours, Family Feud appeared as a plot where the Canning family competed, former host Grant Denyer makes his appearance.

== Awards and nominations ==
Year	Award	Category	Nominee(s)	Result	Ref.
2015	Logie Awards	Most Popular Entertainment Program	Family Feud	Nominated	
2015	Logie Awards	Most Popular Presenter	Grant Denyer	Nominated	
2016	Logie Awards	Gold Logie	Grant Denyer	Nominated	
2016	Logie Awards	Logie Award for Best Presenter	Grant Denyer	Nominated	
2016	Logie Awards	Best Entertainment Program	Family Feud	Won	
2017	Logie Awards	Gold Logie	Grant Denyer	Nominated	
2017	Logie Awards	Logie Award for Best Presenter	Grant Denyer	Nominated	
2017	Logie Awards	Best Entertainment Program	Family Feud	Nominated	
2018	Logie Awards	Gold Logie	Grant Denyer	Won	
2018	Logie Awards	Logie Award for Most Popular Presenter	Grant Denyer	Won	
2018	Logie Awards	Most Popular Entertainment Program	Family Feud	Nominated	
