= Ossie Ostrich =

Australian television puppet character

Oswald Q. Ostrich, better known simply as Ossie Ostrich, is an Australian television puppet character in the form of a pink ostrich with a light blue mohawk hairstyle, created, performed and voiced by Ernie Carroll who appeared firstly on the Tarax Show, and then opposite Daryl Somers as the co-host on the long-running Nine Network program Hey Hey It's Saturday which started as a Saturday morning cartoon show for children in 1971. In 1984, he also hosted an after-school children's show called The Ossie Ostrich Video Show, with co-host Jacki MacDonald.

Cover of the 1976 comedy album Keep Smiling with Daryl and Ossie.

== Origins ==
Ossie Ostrich was designed and made by Werner Axelrad of Lamont Puppets for The Tarax Show.

In late 1971, when VFL footballer Peter McKenna was forced to leave Hey Hey It's Saturday, which he had been co-hosting with Daryl Somers, Ernie Carroll resurrected the puppet which had been "packed away in a dusty suitcase in the GTV props bay" to be Somers' sidekick. Carroll, a veteran of Australian television since it began in 1956, had worked both in children's television and adult comedy programs such as In Melbourne Tonight. He operated Ossie for the next 23 years.

Typically, Ossie would provide the comic foil to Somers' straight man. Somers sometimes retaliated by calling Ossie names like 'Fiberglass Head', but he also had more affectionate names, like his 'pink, feathered beakie'. The comic skill of Somers and Carroll was instrumental in leading to the wider appeal of the show and its move to a prime time spot on Saturday evening.

According to Hey Hey It's Saturday The Book:

Ossie Ostrich stepped out of the case and, as if under the control of a superior being, walked to the host set and looked directly into the left eye of Daryl Somers. "Well, I never!" said Daryl. "Oh you must have," said Ossie. And a link was formed that could only be broken by money. People who actually witnessed that moment say that a spark of electricity seemed to pass between the two. When asked, Daryl said he was not sure but Ossie distinctly remembers passing something.

Ossie was not a part of Hey Hey It's Saturday for the entirety of its 28-year run – indeed his retirement in 1994 was arguably a key factor in the demise of the show – but he was one of the most recognisable puppets in Australia for more than two decades. He did however return briefly for the second Hey Hey reunions as a special guest. Ossie also appeared alongside Somers in the 2010 revival of the series on a regular basis.

Over time, Ossie's head had to be replaced due to mishaps. Lipstick marks from over-amorous admirers were very difficult to remove. Other members of Ossie's family were represented using the same puppet with different accessories.

On the Tarax Show, Ossie's theme song was "Here comes Ossie Ostrich". This was also occasionally heard on Hey Hey. According to the closing credits of Hey Hey It's Saturday, Ossie Ostrich is a copyright of Media Features Services.

== Merchandising ==
Merchandise included a plush toy version of Ossie and a marionette puppet, as well as comic books. TV Week carried an Ossie Ostrich comic strip, written and illustrated by Carroll, and these were collected in book form.
