= Wilbur Wilde =

Australian musician (born 1955)

- Born: Nicholas Robert Aitken; 5 October 1955 (age 70); Sydney, New South Wales, Australia
- Occupations: Television and radio presenter Saxophonist
- Years active: 1975−present
- Known for: Hey Hey It's Saturday, Jo Jo Zep & The Falcons

Wilbur Wilde (born Nicholas Robert Aitken on 5 October 1955) is an Australian saxophonist, television personality and radio presenter. He is best known for his work on Hey Hey It's Saturday. He rose to prominence with the bands Ol' 55 and Jo Jo Zep & The Falcons.

== Career ==
=== Music career ===
Wilde was the tenor saxophonist (and did some vocals) with Ol' 55 from 1975 until 1977. Wilde then joined Jo Jo Zep & The Falcons in 1977 as saxophonist and backing singer. The Falcons dissolved as a unit in 1981, but reunited in 2000 and toured intermittently for the next decade.

=== Television career ===
He appeared as part of the house band on Hey Hey It's Saturday from 1984 until 1999, and again from 2009 until 2010.

Wilde has made numerous other TV appearances throughout his career on shows including The Flying Doctors, MDA, The Paul Hogan Show, Blankety Blanks, Sale of the Century, Celebrity Squares, MTV, Getaway, Postcards, Prisoner, Temptation, Spicks and Specks, The Russell Gilbert Show, and commercials for the Australian Pensioners Insurance Agency. From 1992 to 1999, Wilbur toured with The New Rocky Horror Show, contributing to more than 750 performances along the way. His CV also boasts a string of movie credits including Trojan Warrior, Mad Max, The Coolangatta Gold, City of the Damned, Jenny Kissed Me, Dead End Drive-In, and Cool Change.

=== Radio career ===
Between 2000 and 2004, Wilde presented the Classic Cafe on Gold 104.3 Melbourne. In December 2005, Wilde joined Vega 91.5, hosted a drive show, The Wilbur Wilde Drive, between 3 - 6pm. departing the station in 2008. Wilde also previously presented radio shows at 3UZ and 3XY.

== Personal life ==
Wilde is a supporter of the Melbourne Football Club in the Australian Football League. His brother, Chris Aitken, played fourteen games for them in the 1960s and 1970s. He plays golf at the National. Old Ivanhoe Grammarian, Wilbur gives credit to Mr Frank English, a former Master at Ivanhoe Grammar, for nurturing his musical talent and encouraging him to take a musical direction in life.
