= Phil Lambert =

Australian television identity (1950–2021)

- Born: 1 July 1950; Melbourne, Victoria, Australia
- Died: 25 July 2021 (aged 71); Melbourne, Victoria, Australia
- Occupations: Television identity as camera operator and floor manager
- Years active: 1969−2019

Phillip Lambert (1 July 1950 – 25 July 2021) was an Australian television figure.

== Biography ==
He was notable for his long association with the Nine Network's Melbourne station GTV9 where he worked from 1969 to 2019, becoming the station's longest serving employee.

Throughout his 50 years at the station, Lambert worked chiefly as a camera operator and as a floor manager on numerous Channel 9 productions, working with a range of well known personalities including Graham Kennedy, Don Lane and Bert Newton.

However, he is arguably best known for his regular unscripted on-screen appearances during segments on the station's long running national variety program Hey Hey It's Saturday, where he was nicknamed "Lucky Phil".

He announced his retirement from the station in April 2019.

Lambert died at the age of 71 on 25 July 2021.
