= Somers Carroll Productions =

Somers Carroll Productions is an Australian television production company.

Somers Carroll was formed by Daryl Somers and Ernie Carroll, to produce Hey Hey It's Saturday, after original producer Gavin Disney left the series. Somers Carroll also produced compilation specials including The Best and Worst of Red Faces, Hey Hey By Request, The Plucka Duck Show, The Ossie Ostrich Video Show, Hey Hey it's the Comedians, The Russell Gilbert Show, Gonged but not Forgotten, and most recently the two Hey Hey reunion specials broadcast in 2009 and a revived series of Hey Hey It's Saturday in 2010; additionally, two additional specials were broadcast in 2021 and 2022. Somers Carroll archived past episodes of Hey Hey and making them available to the public by uploading countless hours of the program onto the Internet. This includes all the shows from the reunion show in 2009 and the last full series in 2010, right through to footage from the archives dating back to the early days of the program when it was produced by GTV9.

== Home video ==
Somers Carrol Productions also entered the DVD market, with releases of the Hey Hey by Request and Red Faces specials under its record label 'Now Hear This', which has also released Daryl Somers' album Songlines.

== See also ==
- List of Australian television series
