= The Russell Gilbert Show =

The Russell Gilbert Show is a short-lived Australian comedy show hosted by Russell Gilbert in 1998. It was produced by Somers Carroll Productions and was partially a spin-off from Hey Hey It's Saturday, where Gilbert had risen to prominence. The show's writers included Kevin Blond, Paul Calleja and Andrew Maj. Seven episodes were filmed and aired. Gilbert's former castmate from The Comedy Company, Glenn Robbins also starred in the show. The show was successful and beat Ally McBeal (Channel 7) in the ratings.

In 2000, a similar concept was attempted: Russell Gilbert Live, which was followed in 2001 by Russell Gilbert Was Here!. Both new shows were relatively short-lived.

A two-part special titled The Best of the Russell Gilbert Show aired on 8 and 15 March 2023 on the Seven Network.

== Guests ==
- Glenn Robbins
- George Kapiniaris
- Wilbur Wilde

== See also ==
- GTV

== Sources ==
- The Russell Gilbert Show at IMDb
