= Ricky May =

Australian jazz singer (1943–1988)

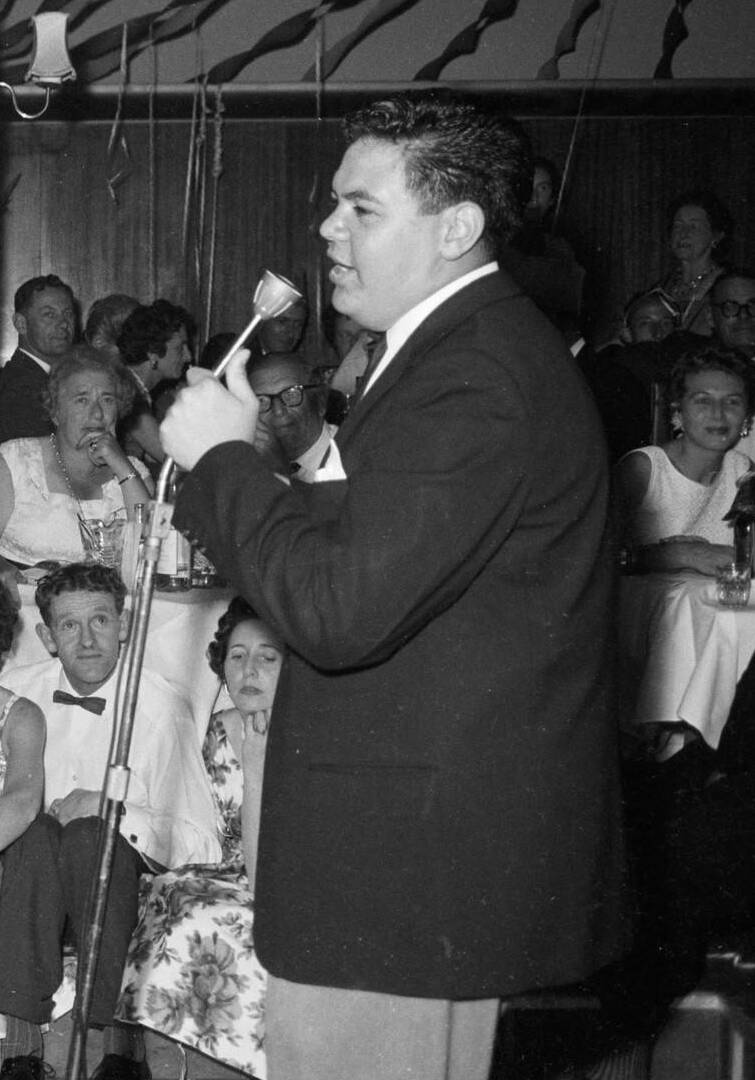
- May performing in Auckland in 1961

Background information
- Born: Richard Ernest May; 22 November 1943; Onehunga, Auckland, New Zealand
- Died: 1 June 1988 (aged 44) Sydney, New South Wales, Australia
- Genres: Jazz; pop
- Occupations: Singer; musician; TV host; host; entertainer
- Instruments: Vocals; drums; piano
- Years active: 1959–1988
- Labels: La Gloria; RCE; WEA; Festival; ABC

Richard Ernest May (22 November 1943 – 1 June 1988) was a New Zealand–born Australian jazz singer and musician, best known for singing cover versions of numerous pop songs or jazz standards. He moved to Australia in 1962 where he worked mainly in theatre and cabaret and had TV appearances on The Don Lane Show, The Midday Show and Hey Hey It's Saturday, as well as taking over hosting from Mike Walsh on pop music show Ten on the Town

== Biography ==
May was born as Richard Ernest May in New Zealand in Onehunga, Auckland, of Māori descent. His father, Keith May, was a jazz band leader and played alto saxophone. May grew up with his siblings, and from the age of 15 he performed at Picasso, a café/nightclub in Auckland. Apart from vocals, May played drums and piano but generally worked as a variety entertainer. He would introduce unconventional vocalisations, improvisation, and the spoken word into performance.

In 1961, jazz pianist Ronnie Smith set up a group to play at the Sorrento Club, Wellington. Smith's group had Tommy Tamati on bass guitar, and May joined on drums and backing vocals. May become a regular with the group and sometimes provided lead vocals. Bruno Lawrence, an English-born jazz musician who was regularly in the audience, often got up to play the drums when May sang lead. The group worked for about a year and toured southern North Island.

At the end of 1961, May returned to Auckland and signed with Harry M. Miller's La Gloria label, which released his debut single in 1961, a cover version of the Chubby Checker hit "Let's Twist Again". He followed with "I Could Have Danced All Night" from My Fair Lady in 1962. During that year, he relocated to Sydney and primarily worked in cabaret. He recorded compositions of Nat King Cole and appeared on Australian TV shows The Don Lane Show, Farnham and Byrne (co-hosted by John Farnham and Debra Byrne), and made regular appearances on The Midday Show.

In 1966, May released another single, "This Little Boy's Gone Rockin'", via RCA (Bluebird Records). From March of that year, he hosted the Sydney teen pop music TV series Ten on the Town on TEN-10. It ran in direct competition with Bandstand on TCN-9 and Col Joye on ATN-7. Walter Learning of The Canberra Times compared the three shows, which "vie for the younger audience" and found that "Bandstand must win hands down" as Col Joye "has no life" and May's show "suffers from over effort on the part of all concerned."

He issued no further recordings until 1973: a double album with the Julian Lee Orchestra, Fats Enough, on ABC records.

In 1974, ABC decided to release a second double album, Just Foolin' Around – A Tribute to Louis Armstrong. In 1983, the first half of this album was re-released on CD as A Tribute to the Greats. 1981 saw the J&B release an album, Ricky May, while ABC Records issued a compilation, The Best of Ricky May, on CD. He issued a duet single with Jonathan Coleman, "Built for Comfort (I Ain't Built for Speed)"/"Off the Record", as the Big Boys in 1983. In 1986, RCA released a Christmas album, It's the Christmas Man. Beyond this point, he concentrated on live cabaret performances and television work. He later appeared regularly on Hey Hey It's Saturday.

In November 1988 there was a golf tournament held in May's honor.

== Awards ==
In 1988, May received the Benny Award from the Variety Artists Club of New Zealand, the highest honour available to a New Zealand variety entertainer.

== Death ==
On 1 June 1988, Ricky May had a fatal heart attack at the Regent Hotel, Sydney, after getting a standing ovation on the opening night of a new cabaret show. He was pronounced dead on arrival at a hospital. He was 44 years of age. His wife, Colleen Ann May, died on 17 August 2017, aged 75, leaving behind the couple's daughter, Shani, who later spoke about her mother's involvement with the Falun Gong new religious movement after her father's death in a 2020 interview with ABC News.

== Discography ==
=== Albums ===
Title	Album details	Peak chart positions
Title	Album details	AUS
Entertainer of the Year	Released: October 1980; Label: J&B (JB-057)	99
Fats Enough (with the Julian Lee Orchestra)	Released: 1983; Label: ABC (L-60011)	—
It's the Christmas Man	Released: 1986; Label: Festival (L-38686)	—
Just Foolin' Around – A Tribute to Louis Armstrong (With Bob Barnard and The Julian Lee Orchestra)	Released: 1987; Label: ABC (L-60027)	—

== Awards ==
=== Mo Awards ===
The Australian Entertainment Mo Awards (commonly known informally as the Mo Awards), were annual Australian entertainment industry awards. They recognise achievements in live entertainment in Australia from 1975 to 2016. Ricky May won three awards in that time.

Year	Nominee / work	Award	Result (wins only)
1979	Ricky May	Entertainer of the Year	Won
1988	Ricky May	John Campbell Fellowship Award	Won
1988	Ricky May	Entertainer of the Year	Won
