= Hey Hey It's Saturday =

1971–1999; 2010 Australian variety television series

- 2010 Hey Hey It's Saturday logo
- Genre: Variety
- Directed by: Peter Ots; Ray Punjer; Scott Duncan; Andrew Cooper
- Presented by: Daryl Somers
- Starring: Jacki MacDonald; John Blackman; Andrew Fyfe; Russell Gilbert; Livinia Nixon; Denise Drysdale; Ossie Ostrich; Plucka Duck; Dickie Knee; Red Symons; Wilbur Wilde; Molly Meldrum; John-Michael Howson
- Judges: Red Symons (Red Faces segment)
- Voices of: John Blackman
- Country of origin: Australia
- Original language: English
- No. of seasons: 29 (1971–1977, 1979–1999, 2009–2010, 2021, 2022)
- No. of episodes: 500+

Production
- Executive producer: Daryl Somers Graeme Trippett
- Producers: Bob Phillips; Pam Barnes; Jenny Parr; Jim Burnett; Ernie Carroll
- Production locations: GTV Richmond, Victoria (1971–1999, 2009–2010)
- Camera setup: Multiple-camera setup
- Running time: 3 hrs (1971–83); 2 hrs (1984–99, 2009–10) (including commercials)
- Production companies: Somers Carroll Productions; United Media Productions; DAS Entertainment

Original release
- Network: Nine Network (1971–1999, 2009, 2010); Seven Network (2021, 2022)
- Release: 9 October 1971 – 20 November 1999 (first run); 30 September and 7 October 2009 (reunion specials); 14 April 2010 – 27 November 2010 (second run); 10 October 2021 and 17 April 2022 (anniversary specials)

Hey Hey It's Saturday was a long-running variety television program in Australia. It initially ran for 28 years on the Nine Network from 9 October 1971 to 20 November 1999, with a recess in 1978. Its host throughout its entire run was Daryl Somers, who later also became executive producer of the program. The original producer, Gavan Disney, left the program in December 1990, and Somers then formed a production company, Somers Carroll Productions, with comedy writer and on-screen partner Ernie Carroll, the performer of Somers' pink ostrich puppet sidekick Ossie Ostrich. Carroll retired in 1994, and Ossie was no longer featured in the show.

On 25 July 2009, the Nine Network announced the show would return for two reunion specials in late 2009 and hinted if they rated strongly, the show could return full-time. The first reunion show aired on 30 September 2009, and the second on 7 October, and both won the ratings on their respective nights. However, the reunion also received negative international attention for a segment featuring performers in blackface.

On 7 December 2009, it was announced that the show was planned to return in 2010 with 20 episodes. Broadcast of the 20 episodes were split into two groups with a break between them, with the revival premiering on Wednesday 14 April 2010. The second group was broadcast on Saturday nights from 16 October 2010 with the season finale on 27 November 2010. Due to falling ratings and high production costs, the show was not renewed for a new season in 2011.

A 50th anniversary special, Hey Hey It's 50 Years, aired on the Seven Network on 10 October 2021, which is 50 years and one day after the show debuted.

The show's website has since been turned into a paid streaming service where people can get access to full episodes and clips from the show for a monthly fee.

== History ==
=== Origins ===
Premiering on 9 October 1971, Hey Hey It's Saturday was a Saturday morning children's program in which Somers and Carroll provided "top and tail" segments between cartoon episodes. Due to the freedom afforded by its low-priority timeslot, the team was able to develop the comedic aspects of the show and the cartoon segments were eventually phased-out in favour of the live performances.

The constant ad-libbing (often laced with double entendre) of the presenters, including voice-over man John Blackman, soon attracted a cult following among younger and older viewers alike. The show's style was variously influenced by vaudeville, the American Tonight Show format, the Marx Brothers, The Goon Show and Monty Python. Somers was also strongly influenced by comedy duo Graham Kennedy and Bert Newton, and it is significant that Carroll wrote for In Melbourne Tonight (IMT) for many years.

Through the early 1970s, as its ratings grew and its meagre budget was increased, Hey Hey evolved into a freewheeling live light entertainment / comedy variety program. Regular segments included "What Cheeses Me Off" (which aired viewer complaints on virtually any subject), "Media Watch Press" (to which viewers contributed humorous newspaper misprints, almost invariably smutty), "Red Faces" (a New Faces–Gong Show-style talent competition) and "Chook Lotto", a parody of variety show barrel competitions, in which the numbers in a farcical lotto game were chosen using numbered frozen chickens spun in a large wire cage. The team also performed live revue-style send-ups of current TV shows such as The Sullivans, or chaotic parodies of soap operas, police shows and other popular TV genres. Like Kennedy's, the humour was of the wink-wink, nudge-nudge variety—viewers became accustomed to Blackman's voice-over snigger—and the satire was broad and skit-level rather than sharp and disturbing.

Like IMT, the earliest years of Hey Hey were marked by a similar "anything can happen" attitude, with sketches and improvisations stretched to the point of absurdity or terminated without warning. Sponsors were also laid open to some gentle ridicule, and live "reads" of sponsor advertising often became part of the comedy—a device that Graham Kennedy had first made famous on his radio show. Hey Hey also broke the "fourth wall", frequently turning the cameras around, taking viewers behind the scenes into every area of the studio, out to the studio pool and even beyond the building. Many of the crew (e.g. floor manager Phillip Lambert) effectively became the de facto supporting cast, either as themselves or as occasional extras in regular segments. During this formative period there was no studio audience, although this later became an integral part of the show. Carroll also occasionally stepped out from behind Ozzie to perform in sketches or as a character, although he usually disguised his voice and/or appearance.

Album cover from the 1976 comedy release Keep Smiling with Daryl and Ossie.

The rapid-fire comedic interplay between Somers, Carroll, Blackman and audio operator Murray Tregonning was central to the show's success. Blackman kept up a near-constant stream of jokes and remarks, and he also provided the voice of the show's many invented characters; some were merely voiced, while others were seen in various forms, including "Mrs McGillicuddy" (a stock photo of a toothless old woman); "Angel" (a Barbie doll dressed as an angel and chroma keyed into the scene); "Norman Neumann" (pronounced /ˈnɔɪmən/ NOY-mən, like the manufacturer), a talking Neumann boom microphone; "The Man From Jupiter"; and the character that became an icon of the show, cheeky "schoolboy" Dickie Knee (a ball with a school baseball cap and long black-haired wig, stuck on a stick), who would pop up in front of Daryl (operated by a stagehand) and make rude remarks. Meanwhile, Tregonning was renowned for his remarkable ability to select and play appropriate sound effects at a second's notice, and his humorous audio punctuations became another trademark of the series. This was long before the introduction of digital sound recording and digital samplers, and all Tregonning's sound effects were played from a huge collection of tape cartridges.

The program went into recess in 1978 when Daryl and Ossie took the bold step of leaving the Nine Network for the rival 0–10 Network to present a primetime show featuring 'comedy, audience participation and novelty games', simply titled The Daryl and Ossie Show. Betty Bobbitt and Monique Daams were co-hosts. Only forty episodes were aired between September and November 1978. Daryl and Ossie then went back to Nine, and Hey Hey It's Saturday returned to air in 1979. The show continued its evolution, beginning with recruitment of popular Queensland TV presenter Jacki MacDonald as a co-host on its return to Nine in 1979.

=== Move to primetime ===
In 1984, the Nine Network moved the show from its morning timeslot to a primetime slot on Saturday nights, and it was briefly renamed Hey Hey It's Saturday Night before reverting to its original name. During this time, Hey Hey also became one of the most important TV venues for both local and international music, film and TV stars. Many visiting overseas stars including actor Sylvester Stallone, singer Tom Jones, musician Stevie Ray Vaughan, and professional wrestler André the Giant were impressed by the program's zany style (and its wide appeal) and made return appearances on subsequent visits. During its peak years, backed by the full resources of Nine and assisted by the rapid improvement in satellite communication, Hey Hey regularly travelled to locations all over Australia and even overseas for live broadcasts.

In October 1984, in a world first, reformed Aussie 1970s rock band Skyhooks appeared on the same night live from their concert at Melbourne's Olympic Park, where they were performing in front of 26,000 people with Daryl and Ossie appearing with them on a giant screen above the stage. The band traded quips with the Hey Hey crew in between performing some of their biggest hits. Red Symons landed his Hey Hey gig as a result of the success of this appearance.

The show enjoyed strong ratings and maintained a dedicated following throughout the Eighties, and became a "must watch" program for a generation of viewers, with its popularity augmented by the stellar guest lineup and regular musical performances. Other personalities gradually came on board, including ex-Skyhooks guitarist Red Symons, who not only played in the show's house band, but was also infamous for his withering sarcasm and as a judge on the "talent" segment Red Faces. Another noted Australian rock musician who became a long serving cast member was saxophonist Wilbur Wilde, who had previously played in Australian bands Ol' 55 and Jo Jo Zep & The Falcons. The regular cast was further expanded by the addition of former Countdown host Molly Meldrum, comedian and ex-The Comedy Company star Russell Gilbert, actor and comedian Maurie Fields, and ex-The Curiosity Show presenter, Dr Deane Hutton.

Hey Hey retained its loyal following well into the 1990s—at one point between 1992 and 1994 also screening on TVNZ (briefly) in primetime, before later being moved to late Saturday nights due to low ratings and eventually being cancelled—but Ernie Carroll decided to retire in 1994, taking Ossie Ostrich with him. Other characters, including "Plucka Duck", were brought in prior to his retirement to partially fill the void left by Carroll's departure. In the late 1980s, a cartoonist, Andrew Fyfe, was added to the team, offering visual gags similar to Blackman and Tregonning's audio contributions. In 1992, Fyfe started his own children's game show on Nine called GuessWhat?. On this show, he drew picture puzzles in front of two teams of children. A number of Somers–Carroll-produced "Red Faces" and Best of Hey Hey specials screened and were rescreened with high ratings for their timeslots. The show also had a lane named after it near its studios.

In 1998, Russell Gilbert got his own Somers–Carroll sketch comedy show on Nine, The Russell Gilbert Show, which lasted a year. Also in that year, Hey Hey went full circle and became a Saturday morning kids TV show again, in the form of a separate show called Plucka's Place. This was hosted by Plucka Duck and Livinia Nixon. Livinia soon went on to co-host the main show. A wide range of Plucka merchandise was released to complement the new program.

=== First cancellation ===
Nine Network executives decided toward the end of 1999 to cancel Hey Hey It's Saturday. Nine cited various reasons for the axing, including a dip in ratings, an ageing audience and a need to cut costs at the network; however, the program still attracted an average of 1.2 million viewers. Somers had also claimed that he wanted to take the program into a new direction after the departure of Carroll, but the budget to redevelop the show was deemed excessive. The final episode ran for 240 minutes, an hour longer than was scheduled. After a break of a few years, Somers moved on to host Dancing with the Stars on the Seven Network in 2004.

Nine re-aired the Hey Hey By Request specials in 2005 and June 2006. Also, on Nine's quiz show Temptation, Hey Hey's Wilbur Wilde and John Blackman appeared in May 2006 as part of Temptation's Logies Superchallenge, and both represented the show. Dickie Knee also made a brief appearance.

In October 2006, the Seven Network began airing old Red Faces segments as a part of a show called The Best and Worst of Red Faces, which had originally screened on the Nine Network in the 1990s.

In June 2007, Daryl Somers received funding from the Seven Network to produce a pilot for a new Saturday Night format.

During the 2008 Logies ceremony, Daryl Somers presented an award for the "Most Outstanding Children's Program". Prior to announcing the winner of the award, Somers did a skit with Dickie Knee and Plucka Duck.

=== Reunions and revival ===
Since the show's initial demise in 1999, there has been a considerable, on-going interest in the reformation of Hey Hey It's Saturday in some capacity. In 2008, a Facebook group created by Corrine Lawrence of Broken Hill was set up to garner support for a return. In July 2009, the Herald Sun ran a story on the campaign, which was subsequently picked up by other media outlets, including the Nine Network itself. Membership of the group skyrocketed as a result, going from 10,000 members to 32,000 members by 22 July 2009. By July 2010 membership exceeded 488,000. ABC Radio Broken Hill interviewed Lawrence and Somers on 22 July 2009 in regard to the growing interest.

It was reported on 24 July 2009 that Daryl Somers and the Nine Network had agreed to a deal for two specials to air in late 2009 after lengthy negotiations and, if the shows rated well, the two would negotiate the return of the show to its original format.

The specials were a mix of old and new content. After a long career with the Nine Network Australia as Director of Production and Operations, Graeme Trippett joined Daryl Somers as co-executive producer. The first reunion special aired on Wednesday, 30 September 2009 and was a ratings success. It attracted a peak audience of 2.64 million viewers and an average audience of 2.169 million people, and beat the debut of Celebrity MasterChef Australia which had a peak audience of 1.92 million viewers and an average audience of 1.36 million. It gave Nine a 40% share of the ratings for that day, topping all other television stations by a massive 20%; it also ranked Number 1 as the highest rating show for that week. The second special aired on 7 October and attracted 300,000 viewers more. The second reunion special once again topped the ratings for that week with an average of 2.3 million viewers, giving Nine its highest share of 2009 at 43.3%. However, it also drew international reaction for the Red Faces segment "The Jackson Jive" (see below), consisting of a Michael Jackson impersonator and five backup dancers in blackface.

Following the success of the 2009 reunion specials, the show returned in 2010 after a deal was signed for at least 20 new episodes. The show was set to air on Wednesday nights but retain the title Hey Hey It's Saturday with Daryl Somers returning as host and co-executive producer with Graeme Trippett.. Ian "Molly" Meldrum had recently signed a deal with Channel 7, excluding him from the line-up. Red Symons was part of the lineup, after his decision to leave Australia's Got Talent on Channel 7. The show returned on 14 April 2010 with over 1.5 million viewers across the five major cities.

=== Second cancellation ===
Despite the initially respectable viewership numbers, ratings steadily dropped after the premiere episode of the new series; in the wake of this, on the 7 July 2010 episode, Somers announced on-air that the current run of episodes would conclude on 21 July 2010 and that Hey Hey It's Saturday would be returning for a seven-episode run in October 2010 and be moved back to its original Saturday night timeslot. The second group of episodes started airing from 16 October 2010, with the season finale on 27 November 2010. However, although still somewhat popular in Melbourne, the ratings of the show nationally were not good enough for Nine to justify the expense of its production, leading to the second cancellation of the show.

In early 2012, Somers announced that Somers Carroll Productions had approached other commercial networks in hope for Hey Hey's return but were unsuccessful despite their best efforts. It was also reported that Somers Carroll Productions were also looking into putting on a live stage version of the show in ticketed venues around the country instead.

Beginning in 2014, Somers Carroll Productions started releasing full episodes and highlights videos of the show from year to year on their official website, http://heyhey.tv. The site charges a fee of $6.95 a month to view full episodes from 1977 to 2010, and also features a four-part holiday special from 1974. Much of the early years of the show were not retained by GTV-9 and so are not available on the site or for DVD release. However, home recordings of some material have been included in retrospectives.

In December 2015, Somers announced that he was still in talks regarding Hey Hey returning "whether it be one or two shows or whatever" in a Christmas video message uploaded to YouTube. Prior to Somers' television return in 2016 as host of You're Back in the Room, he also revealed that the Nine Network had approached Somers Carroll Productions for talks regarding a possible return of Hey Hey.

=== 50th anniversary specials ===
In August 2021 it was reported that Somers had put out a call on social media for ideas for segments to be filmed for a 50th anniversary special that would air in future, with some segments already having been shot with the participation of key cast members. It was later confirmed that the Seven Network would air the special, titled Hey Hey It's 50 Years, after Channel Nine revealed that it rejected Somers' pitch for the celebration. The 90-minute special aired on 10 October 2021, which is 50 years and one day after the show debuted. It drew in 1.2 million viewers.

The success of the anniversary special led to Seven commissioning a second special titled Hey Hey It's 100 Years, which aired in Melbourne and Adelaide on 17 April 2022 and elsewhere in Australia on 24 April 2022. Seven also commissioned two Red Faces specials—The Best of The Best and Worst of Red Faces and The Very Best of the Best and Worst of Red Faces—which were broadcast in July 2022.

In August 2026, Somers announced plans to launch a new streaming platform that will air old episodes of the show as well as related programming such as specials and spin-offs in addition to new content. The new platform will reportedly replace the existing heyhey.tv site.

== Cast ==
=== Host ===
Presenter	Role	Duration
Daryl Somers	Host	1971–99, 2009–10

=== Co-hosts ===
Presenter	Role	Duration
Peter McKenna	Co-host	1971-72
Ernie Carroll	Ossie Ostrich (Co-host)	1971–94, 2009–10
Jacki MacDonald	Co-host	1979–89, 2009, 2010
Denise Drysdale	Co-host	1989–90, 2009
Jo Beth Taylor	Co-host	1996–97, 1999, 2009, 2010
Livinia Nixon	Co-host	1997–99, 2009–10

=== Other regulars ===
Presenter	Role	Duration
John Blackman	Voice-overs	1971–99, 2009–10
Red Symons	Red Faces host & guitarist	1980–99, 2009–10
Andrew Fyfe	Cartoonist	1982–99, 2009–10
Wilbur Wilde	Saxophonist	1984–99, 2009–10
Molly Meldrum	Molly's Melodrama host	1987–99, 2009
Plucka Duck	Pluck-a-duck host	1990–99, 2009–10
Russell Gilbert	Comedian & audience warm up	1990–99, 2009–10
Trevor Marmalade	Live reporter	1991–99, 2009–10
Daryl McKenzie	Musical Director	1992–99, 2009
Penne Dennison	Entertainment reporter	1998–99, 2009–10
Danny Clayton	Music	2010

Notes:

- Denise returned to guest host in 1994.
- Molly appeared in a 2010 episode via archived footage.

== Segments ==
The show became a showcase for comedy and music which was reflected in the show's segments:

=== Red Faces ===
"Red Faces" is a segment in which three (sometimes four) amateur performers or groups would present their routine (which was usually singing, dancing, comedy or something utterly bizarre) before a panel of judges. The segment and its name were a parody of the serious talent quest program New Faces coupled with a gong as in The Gong Show. The panel consisted of Hey Hey's resident band's guitar player Red Symons along with two of the show's guests from that week.

Normally contestants would be gonged by Red Symons well before they finished their performance. Each contestant was then given a score out of 10 by each of the judges. For most acts, Red, always the last to give his score, would usually give his trademark score of 2 along with a pithy and acidic comment. Other times he would give high scores when the performance really was particularly good (or poor)—on several occasions he declared a performance the winning one, even if the others had not been done yet. The winning contestant received a $500 cash prize, second received $250 and third received $100. In the final years, the prizes were doubled and were sponsored by McDonald's restaurant chain. In the 2010 revival of the show, first would receive $2000, second received $1000 and third received $500, initially sponsored by Hungry Jack's but later changed to MyFun.

Some, but not many, contestants found fame after appearing on "Red Faces". One group of friends known as The Music Men performed their own rendition of I Am the Music Man, and were later hired to perform in a beer commercial as a result. Jason Stephens, a comedian who appeared on The Late Show, had his start on Red Faces impersonating a penguin. The Melbourne-based musical comedy trio Tripod also performed a satirical medley of Oasis songs on the show in their very early years. Cate Blanchett also appeared on Red Faces in the late 80s, at the age of 17. "Red Faces" faced its oldest contestant, 96-year-old Dorothy Hayter, in the 80s and Red Faces had its youngest contestant, Kaitlin Elizabeth Millgate (4 months old) on 27 August 1994.

=== Chook Lotto ===
A longstanding game show segment, "Chook Lotto" (or Chooklotto) involved a large barrel of numbered frozen chickens, or "chooks", and was a parody of Tattslotto, one of the National Lottery Draws of Australia. This segment ran from 1984, was rested in 1985, then returned in 1986 and went till the end of 1988. Daryl and Jackie McDonald would draw out 4 chickens numbered from 10 to 19. The home viewer would send in their entry and have to circle one of those numbers as a "Super 69" number. Then another cast member would enter the numbers into a computer (Originally an Atari 800XL, later an Olivetti Model) and whoever had those numbers would be the winner. Then Daryl would return to the desk and use the Super 69 number on ten paper eggs which had the same numbers as the chickens drawn out. Each of them held a prize. The main prize was a car from Ken Morgan Toyota through promotion by Thomson White & Partners advertising; or, if the prize card had stars on it, they would win every prize inside the other eggs. This segment was eventually replaced by Plucka Duck (Pluck-a-duck); however, Chook Lotto returned in the 2010 revival of the show, with viewers invited to go to the show's website and select four numbers as well as a supplementary number. Due to gambling laws in Australia, when Hey Hey was revived in 2009, the game was called "Fake Chook Lotto", and contestants played for no prize whatsoever; however, once the legalities were sorted out, real prizes were offered in 2010.

The chickens were provided by Inghams Enterprises, and all 210 finalists would receive a voucher for a free chicken.

=== Plucka Duck ===
"Plucka Duck", (at first Pluck-a-duck) was the replacement for Chook Lotto, and was responsible for creating the show's character of the same name. Contestants would spin a numbered wheel with each number corresponding to a prize. After the spin, the contestant was allowed to either elect to keep their prize, or have another go by "plucking a duck".

An important ingredient of the segment was Wilbur Wilde singing the Plucka Duck theme song to the tune of Roger Miller's Chug-a-Lug:

"Plucka Duck, Plucka Duck,
He's not a chicken or a cow,
Plucka Duck, that's him right now!"

Many different versions of the theme song were used over time, based on a number of different tunes and adjusted lyrics, such as "Excuse me while I kiss this duck", spoofing the Jimi Hendrix song "Purple Haze". (In the reunion shows and 2010 seasons 1 & 2, Livinia Nixon joined in as well)

If the contestant elected to pluck a duck, the character Plucka Duck—a man in a duck costume—appeared and contestants plucked a feather from his tail. Each feather had a number concealed on it which corresponded to a prize, and that would be the prize won.

This was later changed. In the subsequent version of the contest a large mechanical contraption resemblant of a merry-go-round powered by a bicycle—usually ridden by Plucka himself—would be wheeled on. The contestant would have to pick a soft-toy duck (later created in Plucka's image) from the spinning wheel, which would have a number hidden under its vest. This number, as with the wheel, corresponded with a prize.

On one occasion a contestant spun the wheel and landed the peg between the wheel's highest prize (a car) and that of a lesser prize. The show was interrupted by a phone call from the head of the Nine Network, Kerry Packer, who directed Somers to "Give her the car."

Plucka Duck would often have a female presenter performing alongside him. One of his presenters in the early 1990s was Melissa Hannan who was a popular TV personality at the time, daughter of Jimmy Hannan. Plucka Duck's most recent female presenter was Suze Raymond, who was host of Channel Nine's music video program Eclipse Music TV.

During most of the 1992 segments, Mike O'Donnell theme music for Thomas the Tank Engine was played while the wheel spun for contestants.

=== Molly's Melodrama ===
The former talent co-ordinator/interviewer of Australian Television's Countdown, Molly Meldrum hosted a segment titled "Molly's Melodrama". This segment was similar to Countdown's Humdrum segment where Molly would review local and international music as well as interview the famous and infamous faces of the musical scene. However, in true Hey Hey fashion, Molly's segment was often taken over by other cast members (Dickie Knee in particular) who often performed cruel and painful pranks on Meldrum.

Prior to Molly Meldrum, the music review segment featured Gavin Wood, former Countdown voice-over man, with his segments frequently punctuated with practical jokes targeting him.

=== Ad Nauseam ===
A quiz where contestants, which usually were either studio audience members or Hey Hey guests, would answer questions based on television commercials.

=== Beat It ===
Similar to Ad Nauseam, this was a music quiz. The segment's title was taken from the Michael Jackson song of the same name, which was played by the house band at the beginning of each installment.

=== Lost for Words ===
A game show style segment where a number of celebrities would be asked to name a word that started with the last letter of the previous word.

=== Magic Word ===
An audience member would be brought onto the stage and presented with an unusual word. Various Hey Hey crew members (usually Dickie, Red or Russell) would each give the member a possible meaning of the word, one of which was the word's actual meaning. If that person correctly guessed whose meaning was the right one, that person would win a prize.

=== Masterslime ===
A parody of Mastermind, where contestants were strapped to a chair and had to answer a maximum of 6 questions. If that contestant got three questions wrong, he or she got "slimed".

=== Media Watch ===
The Media Watch segment displayed humorous errors from TV and newspapers, generally sent in by the viewers. As the segment became more popular, it was split into "Media Watch Press" and "Media Watch TV".

After the end of HHIS, the concept used in "Media Watch" and "Phunny Fotos" was replicated in the What The? segment on Rove Live. A similar segment appears on the U.S. TV program Late Show with David Letterman under the name Small Town News.

=== The Great Aussie Joke ===
The hosts of this segment were Shane Bourne and Maurie Fields. This segment was also featured on the first reunion show, which was fifteen years after Maurie's death, with Maurie being superimposed into the set, and doing the joke with son Marty.

=== The Nixon Tapes ===
This segment, which appeared during Livinia Nixon's time on the show, featured footage from movies or TV shows sent in by viewers, which contained a mistake or blooper of some sort (such as a production error). Audience members had to guess what the mistake was.

=== Celebrity Head ===
In this segment, three contestants would have the name of a celebrity placed on top of their heads where they could not see them. Using a series of questions which could only be answered with either "yes" or "no", the contestants had to try to guess who their celebrity was. The name, like many other parts of the show, was joked upon for its double entendre. As one of the most popular games on Hey Hey, "Celebrity Head" was adapted into a board game and retains casual interest.

=== Spoofs ===
Spoofs of other programs were a regular feature in the early years. This began with caustic voice-overs of old TV shows, (comparable to the much later American program Mystery Science Theater 3000 and similar to other Australian comedy efforts including the "Europa Films" segments of The Aunty Jack Show and the 1980s live comedy team Double Take). Later, this expanded into ongoing comedy sketches such as Division Saturday (a parody of Division 4), The Sillivans (The Sullivans) and The Shove Boat (The Love Boat).

The rural radio station 2QN Radio Deniliquin was satirised until official complaints were received, leading to a change over to 2KW Upper Kumbukta West, a fictional country town that was also home to the "Mrs Mac" character. The fictitious country of 'Biddleonia' was created as a new home for Irish jokes etc., so as not to offend any actual minorities.

Ian Buckland appeared and also performed in sketches including a satire called "The World's Worst Magician". These segments spawned merchandise in the form of magic kits and products.

In each of the two reunion shows, there was a "DisasterChef" segment—a spoof of MasterChef Australia.

In 2010, Hey Hey spoofed many commercials with Trevor and Russell in them.

== Cultural impact ==
Other Australian sketch comedy programs have satirised the show at one point or another, including The Comedy Company when it was parodied as Ho Hum It's Saturday and Mad magazine which did a parody with the same title. The 1997 comedy film The Castle memorably portrayed the program as the Kerrigan family's second-favourite television show (with their favourite show being "The Best of Hey Hey It's Saturday").

Use of terminology from the show spawned controversy during a Test cricket match between Australia and South Africa in Melbourne in December 2005. Australian bowler Shane Warne referred to South African batsman Makhaya Ntini, who was batting with an injured knee, as "John Blackman". Warne was claiming that Ntini was controlling his "dicky knee" just like Blackman "controlled" Dickie Knee on the show. But Ntini, a Bantu, interpreted the remark as a racist jibe, and a minor controversy occurred. Eventually Australian captain Ricky Ponting explained the situation to South African captain Graeme Smith. Blackman himself had in fact visited the Australian team's dressing rooms not long before the incident occurred.

A number of musical guests have written tribute songs to the show, including one by Ricky May.

== Criticism ==
Despite the ongoing popularity of Hey Hey with viewers during its first incarnation, by the late 1990s some television critics considered the show to be corny and had become "a tired old fossil". Although the 21st-century incarnation of the show also initially rated highly, the show came under renewed criticism for being backward and culturally insensitive. In retrospect, its outlook and many of its jokes are now considered by some commentators to be racist, sexist, and homophobic. The international controversy surrounding the Jackson Jive sketch on "Red Faces" led to the show being derided as "old fashioned, out of touch, stale, [and] misguided". In 2021, Somers stated that he believed that some of the content that aired on the show in the past would not be acceptable today due to “political correctness and the cancel culture”; his remarks faced additional criticism.

Singer and frequent guest Kamahl has stated that his ethnicity and background were often the butt of jokes during his appearances on the show, likening his treatment to being humiliated. A rebuke by John Blackman to Kamahl's claims received backlash on social media. In April 2021, Somers wrote a lengthy apology to Kamahl and to those who found the show's content offensive. Kamahl unreservedly accepted Somers' apology.

=== The Jackson Jive ===
International controversy was caused by an act during the "Red Faces" segment during the second reunion special on 7 October 2009 called "the Jackson Jive". The sketch featured six performers: five dressed as the Jackson Five in matching blackface outfits and wearing large afro wigs, with their teeth made extremely white; and one as an adult Michael Jackson, his face painted white, with Michael Jackson being portrayed by a man of Indian heritage. They sang the Jackson Five's hit "Can You Feel It" in a jive style. During the act, a cutaway showed a caricature of Kamahl with a caption reading "Where's Kamahl?". Red Symons eventually gonged the act off.

The group had performed the same act in "Red Faces" in 1989, without incident, during Hey Hey's original run. This was not the only act to do blackface on the show — a woman using the alias of Mammy Smith (a reference to Mamie Smith) wore blackface to do a cover of George Gershwin's "Summertime" in an episode in 1993, while Somers himself had also appeared in brownface or blackface on multiple episodes, including a tribute to the late Ricky May in 1988 and in blackface to make fun of Kamahl.

American musician Harry Connick Jr., who performed on the show, was serving as a guest judge at the time and strongly expressed his disapproval of the skit when asked to give a score, and also later on in the show, and gave the performers a score of zero. He appeared visibly uncomfortable throughout the skit. He said, "If they turned up like that in the United States, it'd be like Hey Hey There's No More Show." He later said that he would not have agreed to be on the show had he known beforehand about the sketch.

Somers apologised to Connick on-air after a brief station break. He said that nobody had intended to deliberately offend the viewers, the guests, or the audience, and he described the sketch as a "bit retro". The incident drew some negative response within Australia, but it drew heavy negative reaction from commentators around the world, including in the US and the UK, and it prominently highlighted significant differences between the cultural acceptability of blackface in Australian culture compared with American culture.

== Programming history ==
Programming History
Name	Dates	Day	Timeslot
Hey Hey It's Saturday	9 October 1971 – 29 September 1973	Saturday	8:30am–11:30am
Hey Hey It's Saturday	6 October 1973 – 26 November 1977	Saturday	8:00am–11:00am
Hey Hey It's Saturday	17 February 1979 – 3 December 1983	Saturday	8:00am–11:00am
Hey Hey It's Saturday Night	11 February 1984 – 25 May 1985	Saturday	9:30pm–12:00am
Hey Hey It's Saturday	8 June 1985 – 13 November 1999	Saturday	6:30pm–8:30pm
Hey Hey It's Saturday: Final	20 November 1999	Saturday	6:30pm–10:30pm
Hey Hey It's Saturday: The Reunion	30 September – 7 October 2009	Wednesday	7:30pm–10:30pm (30 September); 7.30pm–11:00pm (7 October)
Hey Hey It's Saturday	14 April 2010 – 28 July 2010	Wednesday	7:30pm–9:30pm
Hey Hey It's Saturday	16 October 2010 – 27 November 2010	Saturday	7:30pm–9:30pm

== Movie ==
In 1992, Hey Hey It's Saturday broadcast an episode from Australia's latest theme park, Warner Brothers Movie World, situated in Gold Coast, Queensland. During their time there, the Hey Hey crew made a 45-minute feature film in just seven days. The film was titled "Silence of the Hams" and featured all the current cast members of the show. The movie's premise was in celebration of the 50th anniversary of the film Casablanca and starred Daryl Somers as a private investigator named Rick Shaw, who is attempting to track down who is responsible for trying to destroy the world's movie business.

The announcement was made on the following episode that they had made a movie and, after editing, that it would appear on the Nine Network. It was first broadcast on 15 June 1992 and was only ever repeated once on television. The movie has never been transferred to any form of official home media, but the entire movie was uploaded to YouTube on the official Hey Hey channel.

== Awards ==
Hey Hey It's Saturday won 19 Logies during its 29-year run. Awards the show has won include:

Award	Awarded to	Year(s) won
Most Popular Personality (Gold Logie)	Daryl Somers	1983, 1986, 1989
Most Popular Light Entertainment Personality	Daryl Somers	1993, 1995, 1996, 1997
Most Popular Light Entertainment / Comedy Personality	Daryl Somers	1990
Most Popular Light Entertainment Program	The show	1987, 1988, 1993, 1994, 1995, 1997, 1998, 1999, 2000
Most Popular Comedy Program	The show	1985, 1999

The show and cast have been nominated for various Logies over its run. Awards nominated include:

Award	Nominee	Year(s) nominated
Most Popular Personality (Gold Logie)	Daryl Somers	1984, 1985, 1987, 1988, 1990, 1991, 1993, 1994, 1995, 1996, 1997, 1998
Most Popular Light Entertainment Personality	Daryl Somers	1994
Most Popular Light Entertainment Program	The show	1986, 1996, 2010 (Reunion), 2011
Most Popular Light Entertainment / Comedy Program	The show	1991, 1992
Most Popular Light Entertainment / Comedy Personality	Daryl Somers	1990, 1991
Most Popular Comedy Program	The show	1997, 1998
Most Popular Program	The show	1998
Most Popular Comedy Personality	Russell Gilbert	1995, 1996
Most Popular Comedy Personality	Daryl Somers	1996, 1997
Most Popular Comedy Personality	Plucka Duck	1997

== See also ==
- List of Australian television series
- Television in Australia
- List of longest-running Australian television series
