= Ernie Carroll =

Australian television personality (1929–2022)

- Born: Ernest Carroll; 26 May 1929; Geelong, Victoria, Australia
- Died: 30 March 2022 (aged 92); Mornington, Victoria, Australia
- Occupations: Entertainer; writer; producer; puppeteer
- Years active: 1957–1994, 2009–2010
- Partner: Miffy Marsh
- Children: 2

Ernest Carroll (26 May 1929 – 30 March 2022) was an Australian puppeteer, entertainer, radio and television personality, comic writer, television producer and comic strip writer, most recognised for his role as the sidekick opposite Daryl Somers, as the man behind (and inside) Ossie Ostrich on Hey Hey It's Saturday, Cartoon Corner and The Daryl and Ossie Show.

== Life and career ==
=== Early life ===
Carroll was born in Geelong, the son of a fruit farmer. After attending the Vincent School of Broadcasting in Melbourne, he made his radio début on 3TR which at that time was based in Sale. He became well-known at Geelong radio station 3GL in the 1950s, and joined Melbourne television station GTV-9 in its first active year, 1956, as a producer for children's television. He worked on shows such as The Tarax Show both on screen and as a producer, and later wrote for Graham Kennedy. He created the character of the "squeaky-voiced moppet" Joy-Belle and Professor Ratbaggy, which owed its origins to Denzil Howson's Professor Nitwitty from the late 1950s, and he appeared as Uncle Ernie. He also penned the comic strip versions of Gerry Gee, Joy-Belle and Ossie Ostrich.

=== Career ===
His greatest fame was as the puppeteer and voice of "Ossie Ostrich", initially on The Tarax Show, then on the long-running and successful variety show Hey Hey It's Saturday with Daryl Somers. Carroll hired Somers to work on Cartoon Corner, and played the role of Ossie when Somers' co-host, the footballer Peter McKenna, was forced to withdraw: Carroll "decided to replace McKenna with ... one of his old puppet characters he had stashed in a suitcase." Cartoon Corner, with Somers and Carroll as hosts, ran between 1971 and 1977, when both men left the Nine Network for the 0-10 Network and The Daryl and Ossie Show, an arrangement that would only last a year and which saw them return to Nine in 1979. Ossie, played by Carroll, was also Somers' sidekick on Hey Hey from 1971 until December 1994, when Carroll retired. He reprised his role as Ossie in 2009 with the second Hey Hey reunion special and later returned to the show's reinstatement in 2010. Carroll and Somers created the television production company Somers Carroll Productions.

Carroll was notoriously eager to keep the illusion of Ossie separate from his role as puppeteer; for instance, he would refuse to have his picture taken with the puppet. An article about Carroll in The Age in 1993 described one episode of Hey Hey in which Nigel Kennedy told viewers "something like, 'Hey look, there's a bloke over there with his arm up the bird'", to which Carroll responded with "a rare on-air putdown ... 'Some people have no sense of fantasy!'"

== Death ==
Carroll died on 30 March 2022, aged 92, at Racecourse Grange Aged Care in Mornington, Victoria, Australia, where he had lived with his partner of almost 50 years, Miffy Marsh.
