= New Faces (Australian TV series) =

- Also known as: New Faces Australia
- Genre: Talent show
- Created by: Kevin Dennis
- Presented by: Frank Wilson (1963–1976); Bert Newton (1976–1985), (1992–1993)
- Country of origin: Australia
- Original language: English
- No. of seasons: 24

Original release
- Network: Nine Network
- Release: 14 September 1963 – 1985
- Network: Network Ten
- Release: 1992 – 1993

New Faces was an Australian talent show that preceded the British show of the same name, produced at GTV-9 Melbourne. The program began in 1963 under the name Kevin Dennis Auditions, sponsored by a new car dealership, Kevin Dennis Motors, which was run by Kevin Dennis (Dennis Gowing), who also made the 'Update' television commercials in the 1960s–1970s, which were featured during the breaks of the show. The program ran on Saturday mornings. The program name soon changed to Kevin Dennis New Faces, and later simply New Faces, becoming a Sunday night primetime show.

The program began as a vehicle for Melbourne businessman Kevin Dennis to promote his business. Australian journalist Derryn Hinch, in remembering Kevin Dennis, said:

Recently, I was asked to recall and record some thoughts about a genuine, almost (we thought) indestructible, Melbourne identity. Kevin Dennis. AKA, Dennis Gowing. He was a man who once (as Kevin Dennis) bought more TV advertising on more TV programmes than any person then or since.

== Hosts ==
Originally hosted by Frank Wilson from 1963 to 1976, and then by Bert Newton from 1976 to 1985, the show featured two judges, such as Bobby Limb, Geoff Brooke, Rod McLennan and Tim Evans.

== Contestants and winners ==
Contestants would compete in heats, with the winners competing in finals. Many of its contestants later became famous, including Paul Hogan, Olivia Newton-John, Daryl Somers, The Hawking Brothers, Col Elliott, Julia Morris and Keith Urban.

Year	Contestant	Placement
1964	The Spinning Wheels	Second-last
1965	Olivia Newton-John	Unknown
1969	Liv Maessen	Runner-up
1969	Mike McClellan	Winner
1970	Daryl Somers	Runner-up
1970	John Williamson	Winner
1971	Paul Hogan	Unknown
1971	Susie Coles	Winner
1971 (Adelaide)	Mike and Keith Webb	Winners
1972	Shane Bourne	Heat Winner
1972	Rave (Shepparton pop band)	Winners
1973	Maria Mercedes	Unknown
1973	Col Elliott	Winner
1975	John Robinson Showband	Heat Winner
1976	Lyn Bryant (now Billie Wilde)	Winner
1977	Debby Jean (Baker)	Winner
1982	Martin Lass	Winner
1983	Keith Urban	Unknown
1984	Michelle French	Winner
1990	Peter Andre	Offered record deal at audition
1993	Jerson Trinidad	Winner

== Revivals ==
From 1989, Daryl Somers hosted and produced the program on GTV-9. In 1992, Bert Newton hosted the program on Network Ten, running until 1993.

== See also ==
- List of Australian music television shows
