= Daryl Somers =

Australian television personality and musician

Daryl Somers OAM
- Born: Daryl Paul Schulz; 6 August 1951 (age 75); Geelong, Victoria, Australia
- Occupations: Television host, musician
- Years active: 1971–present
- Known for: Cartoon Corner; Hey Hey It's Saturday (1971–1999, 2009–2010); Dancing with the Stars (2004–2007, 2021–2023)
- Spouse: Julie da Costa
- Awards: 3 Gold Logies (1983, 1986, 1989)

Daryl Paul Somers (né Schulz; 6 August 1951) is an Australian television presenter and musician, and a triple Gold Logie award winner. He rose to national fame as the host and executive producer of the long-running comedy-variety program Hey Hey It's Saturday and continued his television celebrity and status as host of the live-performance program Dancing with the Stars.

Somers was honoured in 2004 with the award of a Medal of the Order of Australia, and by Australia Post in 2018 by having his portrait featured on a series of postage stamps.

== Early life ==
Somers lived in the Melbourne suburb of Prahran and was educated at the Christian Brothers College, St. Kilda. A drummer and singer, he played in bands such as the Newbeat Brass and a group playing music in the style of Herb Alpert which began under the name "Pasquale and his Mexican Rhythm". Newbeat Brass comprised five schoolfriends and quickly gained an 18-month residency at the Cascade Restaurant in the Melbourne suburb of Moorabbin. It was either Newbeat Brass or another group, Somerset, formed by Somers subsequently, which appeared on GTV-9's talent-quest program New Faces, winning their way to the finals only to be beaten by John Williamson. His parents and brothers had changed their name from Schulz to Somers by 1970.

== Television career ==
=== Cartoon Corner and Hey Hey It's Saturday era (1971–77, 1979–1999) ===
Somers started professional TV work on 14 July 1971. Two stories have been told about his entree into television; one that he was spotted by Ernie Carroll and invited to audition. In this telling, his audition included an impersonation of Mr Magoo. A different version of the story, in Somers' own telling from a 1976 issue of TV Week, is that he was taking singing lessons from Evie Hayes who arranged for him to audition for a hosting role. He impressed a panel of 'people sitting upstairs' with his Popeye voice, and was told three weeks later he had the job. He was paid $75 ($863.22 in 2022 terms) a week as the Melbourne host of Cartoon Corner.

The Sydney Cartoon Corner had previously been shown in Melbourne with the name Skeeter's Cartoon Corner; it was hosted by James Kemsley who would go on to draw the famous Ginger Meggs comic strip for 23 years. Somers' first words were "Hi, I'm Daryl Somers; Skeeter will no longer be with us, and now it's time for a cartoon." (Another account has it that his opening line was, 'Hello, I'm Daryl Somers and I'll be here for as long as you want me'). Kemsley continued to host the Sydney Cartoon Corner until mid-1973, and other states would have their own similar but unique programs.

Soon after Somers' debut on Cartoon Corner, he began hosting additional children's shows on GTV-9. The first of these was on 23 August 1971, for a week's programming under the title Holiday Carnival. This was a two-and-a-half hour slot in which Somers presented competitions alongside the footballer Peter McKenna who provided football tips—interspersing a screening of various old films such as the 1944 western Ghost Guns. This short-lived series of programs proved to be the forerunner to Hey Hey It's Saturday, which officially began on 9 October 1971. Somers and McKenna continued as hosts, but eight weeks later the show introduced the pink puppet Ossie Ostrich, operated and voiced by Carroll. Old films continued to be a feature of the early shows: the first Hey Hey It's Saturday incorporated the Shirley Temple film Stowaway. McKenna continued to be billed as cohost until September 1972 and the following month, Ossie Ostrich's name began to appear alongside Somers' in TV listings.

While it quickly morphed into a Saturday morning children's cartoon show—an expanded version of Cartoon Corner, which Somers continued to host for some years (the Somers Cartoon Corner was broadcast in Sydney as well as Melbourne beginning in 1975) Hey Hey It's Saturday gradually expanded in both size and scope.

In early 1978, Somers and Carroll suspended making of Hey Hey It's Saturday in their first attempt to broaden their audience—or rather, to find a time slot and a format to fully cater to the audience they already had. Hey Hey It's Saturday did not appear in early 1978 and instead Somers and Carroll created The Daryl and Ossie Special for Nine. Somers told the Sydney Sun-Herald that despite the perception of Hey Hey as a children's show, '40 per cent of our audience' were, in fact, adults. The new special took two months to write, featured guests Chelsea Brown and The Echoes, and first screened in Melbourne on 10 May 1978. Soon afterwards Somers and Carroll left Nine to create a new show on the 0-10 Network, The Daryl and Ossie Show, which ran in September and October of that year. The show's ratings were poor, and they returned to Nine the following year to resume Hey Hey It's Saturday on 17 February 1979 with Jacki MacDonald as co-host.

Soon, additional cast members joined, and cartoons were phased out in favour of regular and guest performers. Alongside MacDonald, booth announcer John Blackman voiced many (unseen) characters. The program's production crew also began to play a prominent role in the series, with sound-effects technician Murray Tregonning adding humorous sound bites and effects from a huge bank of recorded eight-track cartridges, and personnel such as long-serving cameraman "Lucky Phil" Lambert making regular appearances.

Props assistant Ian "Krystal" Murray provided props, most famously the "Dickie Knee" character:

I hit my knee on the desk one morning and said, 'Oh, I've got a dicky knee', and this voice immediately answered 'G'day' [...] A week later Krystal came up with this hairdressing polystyrene head with a wig on and wearing a school cap. It popped up in front of the desk and became a permanent character.

The series' distinctive brand of irreverent humour soon attracted a sizable adult audience and in 1984 it had become so popular that Nine made the decision to move it to a 9:30 p.m. Saturday evening timeslot. The show was renamed Hey Hey It's Saturday Night. It remained on Saturday night for the rest of its run, but it moved to the 6:30 p.m. time slot in June 1985 and eventually reverted to the name Hey Hey It's Saturday. At its height, Hey Hey It's Saturday was one of the most popular and consistently high-rating series in the history of Australian television, winning many awards including three Gold Logie awards for Somers. In its initial incarnation, Hey Hey screened for 28 years (1971–1999) on the Nine Network across Australia.

=== Bandstand (1976) ===
In 1976, Somers branched out to become host of a revival of the music show Bandstand for Channel 9. It was reported at the time that Somers hoped Bandstand would "open the doors to an international cabaret career in London and Las Vegas." The new version of the show—also known as Bandstand '76—was a commercial television response to the success of ABC-TV shows such as Countdown. It was scheduled at 6 p.m. on Saturday nights in Sydney or 6:30 in Melbourne, against the repeat of the previous Sunday's Countdown. The first episode, screened 21 February 1976, featured AC/DC, Ted Mulry Gang, Bill and Boyd, Bryan Davies, Debbie Byrne, Lee Conway, The Executives and video clips of songs by Queen, Max Merritt and the Meteors, and ABBA. Unlike Countdown, which showcased only original artists and insisted on the right to premiere new releases Somers' Bandstand featured a mixture of video clips and local artists performing current hits by others. Somers told Dale Plummer of the Sydney Sun-Herald in November 1976 that his show had 'a wider age group than the others, and surveys show we have a much higher rating generally.' It was announced in early 1977 that the show was renewed for the new year but it did not go ahead.

=== Family Feud and The Daryl Somers Show (1980–1983) ===
In 1980, Somers replaced Tony Barber on the quiz show Family Feud and hosted the program for three years and 713 episodes.

Somers had long hoped to host his own variety and chat show. He had stood in for Graham Kennedy on In Melbourne Tonight in 1975 and briefly hosted other programs when their regular presenters were absent. In June 1982, he was given his own Tuesday night TV variety show in the style of The Don Lane Show (which was continuing to run twice a week, on Mondays and Thursdays, in the same time slot of 9:30 p.m.) and named The Daryl Somers Show. While Ossie Ostrich was not part of the cast (he did continue to host Hey Hey It's Saturday with Somers throughout the duration of Somers' own show), Ernie Carroll headed the writers' team. This team also included 'heroes of the inner city comedy circuit' Alan Pentland (later a writer for Full Frontal) and Geoff Kelso, soon to be a cast member and writer for The Gillies Report. John Blackman was a regular, as were the voice artist Paul Jennings and music director Geoff Harvey. The show's producer, Peter Wynne, told the Sydney Morning Herald's Richard Coleman that the show would feature many short segments, appeal to the 16-35 age group, and 'offer something like a restaurant's menu.'

Critics were rarely kind about the show. At the end of its second month, Denis Price wrote that Somers failed as a host, 'albeit valiantly, because he is locked into some producer's rigidly inherited set of preconceptions about the essential nature of these late-evening entertainments.' It rated well in Melbourne, but did not match this success in Sydney throughout its run. Jenny Tabakoff, writing in the Melbourne Age, suggested that there was a 'long tradition of such Tonight shows' in Melbourne, musing that 'perhaps Sydney viewers just feel left out.'

In November 1983, John Blackman withdrew from involvement in The Daryl Somers Show, though it is not clear whether this was the reason the show was not renewed the following year.

Somers continued to host Hey Hey It's Saturday as a morning children's show during this period. He won his first Gold Logie Award for Most Popular Personality on Australian TV in 1983. Also in 1983, Somers was crowned King of Moomba with Edna Everage as his court jester.

=== Break (2000–2003) ===
During the five years after Hey Hey It's Saturday's demise in December 1999, Daryl Somers rarely made public appearances, with the exception of a court appearance in 2001 to answer a drink-driving charge (after which Somers admitted he was "a bloody idiot"—a reference to a famous anti-drunk-driving advertising campaign of that time)—and an appearance as a guest on the Network Ten program Rove Live. At the ARIA Music Awards of 2000, he received a Special Achievement Award, "for the contribution that Hey Hey It's Saturday made in providing an outlet for Australian artists to showcase their music".

=== Dancing with the Stars era (2004–2007) ===
In late 2004, Somers returned to the small screen when he made the move to sign with Nine's arch rival, the Seven Network, hosting Dancing with the Stars, a live program where 10 celebrities compete each week in a dance competition. On 30 November 2007, Somers announced that he would leave Dancing with the Stars. Somers was replaced by actor Daniel MacPherson, who was the host from season 8 till season 14.

=== Return of Hey Hey It's Saturday (2009–2010) ===
Somers had another year off television duties in 2008. Interest had been considered in the reformation of Hey Hey It's Saturday in some capacity. ABC Radio Broken Hill interviewed Hey Hey enthusiast Corrine Lawrence and Somers on 22 July 2009 in regards to the growing interest. He revealed the show's return is "not out of the question" and speculated that one or two reunion specials could be made in the near future. A reunion special aired on 30 September 2009. It rated strongly, attracting 3.9-plus million viewers, although the second show generated international controversy because of a blackface Jackson 5 parody act (called The Jackson Jive) who appeared on the "Red Faces" segment.

With the success of the Reunion Specials in 2009, the show returned in 2010 as a regular series. The 2010 series had twenty episodes airing, with the first thirteen episodes airing from April until July, with the remaining seven episodes airing in October and November. Hey Hey It's Saturday did not return in 2011 due to falling ratings and the high cost of its production.

=== You're Back in the Room (2016) ===
In October 2015, it was announced that Somers would return to the Nine Network to host an Australian version of the British hypnotism game show, You're Back in the Room in 2016.

The Australian version of You're Back in the Room premiered on 3 April 2016, attracting 1.155 million viewers, despite negative reactions on Twitter.

=== Return to Dancing and Hey Hey 50th anniversary (2021) ===
In 2021, Dancing with the Stars was revived by the Seven Network, with Somers returning as host. Later that year it was reported that Somers was working on a Hey Hey It's Saturday 50th anniversary special that would air not on Nine, where it had screened originally, but on Seven. The special aired on 10 October 2021, titled Hey Hey It's 50 Years, and drew in 1.2 million viewers.

== Business ventures ==
In 1989 TV Week reported that Somers was a silent partner in a venture to import a low-carbonated European soft drink, Alm Dudler, into Australia. 'When I was given the opportunity to get involved,' he told the magazine, 'I jumped at it.' Little more was reported on this operation.

== Music career ==
Somers released two comedy albums in 1975 and 1976 co-credited to Ossie Ostrich. Songs by both were a key feature of these extremely successful releases.

Somers also released two pop singles in the 1980s: 'What's Forever For' backed with 'Can I See You Tonight', released in 1981. This single failed to sell, it was reported in 1983, because it was 'caught up in two strikes and a record company take over'. It was followed by 'Don't Want to Share Your Love' backed with 'You Look Just Like a Heartache to Me', released in 7" and 12" formats in 1985.

In the mid-1980s, Somers was signed to Brian Cadd's label Graffiti Records. Cadd had been arranger and producer on 'Don't Want to Share Your Love'. The pair worked on a pop album that was ultimately shelved. In Cadd's 2010 autobiography, he said (of Somers) "making that album, he was undoubtedly the hardest working person I'd ever been with in the studio", adding "It was a truly fun project. However, there was one serious flaw that finally beat us. Daryl's voice was just too classically trained. He could get it right down to the very edge of pop but there was always that slight cabaret vibrato that gave him away."

Somers released an album on the Sony BMG label titled Songlines in 2005.

=== Albums ===
- Hey! Hey! It's Daryl & Ossie – Hammard (1975)
- Keep Smiling With Daryl & Ossie – Hammard (1976)
- Songlines – Sony BMG (2005)

=== Singles ===
- "What's Forever For" / "Can I See You Tonight?" (1981)
- "Don't Want To Share Your Love" / "You Look Just Like A Heartache To Me" (1985)

== TV credits ==
- New Faces (1968) as Runner-up contestant
- New Faces (1970) as Winning contestant
- Cartoon Corner (1971–77) as Host
- Hey Hey it's Saturday (1971–99, 2009–10) as Host / Producer
- Bandstand (1976) as Host
- King of Pop Awards (1976–77) as Host
- The Graham Kennedy Show (1970s) as Regular artist
- The Don Lane Show (1970s) as Regular artist
- The Mike Walsh Show (1970s) as Regular artist
- Family Feud (1980–83) as Host
- Countdown (1981) as Guest Host
- The Daryl Somers Show (1982–83) as Host
- Blankety Blanks (1985) as Host
- TV Week Logie Awards, (1988, 1991, 1996–98, 2006) as Host
- New Faces (1989) as Host / Producer
- The Russell Gilbert Show (1998) as Producer
- Gonged But Not Forgotten (1999) as Producer
- Dancing with the Stars (2004–07, 2021–23) as Host
- You're Back in the Room (2016) as Host

== Awards and recognition ==
In the Australia Day 2004 honours list, Somers was awarded a Medal of the Order of Australia "for service to the television and entertainment industries, to charitable organisations and to the community". In 2018, Australia Post featured his portrait on a series of postage stamps to commemorate that he had "made unique contributions to the Australian entertainment industry and ... played a role in forming our national popular culture".

=== Mo Awards ===
The Australian Entertainment Mo Awards (commonly known informally as the Mo Awards), were annual Australian entertainment industry awards. They recognise achievements in live entertainment in Australia from 1975 to 2016. Daryl Somers won one award in that time.

Year	Nominee / work	Award	Result (wins only)
1999	Daryl Somers	John Campbell Fellowship Award	Won

Somers has been a part of the Logies since his early days of television, either as host, winner, or nominee. He has been host five times (1988, 1991, 1996, 1997, 1998) and co-host in 2006.

Association	Award	Year	Results
Australian Government	OAM	2004	Honoured
Australia Post	Australian Postage Stamp (Australian Television Legends Series)	2018	Honoured
Logie Awards	Gold Logie x3	1983, 1986 and 1989	Won
Logie Awards	Most Popular Light Entertainment/Comedy Personality	1990	Won
Logie Awards	Most Popular Light Entertainment Personality	four times (1993, 1995, 1996, 1997)	Won
Logie Awards	Most Popular Comedy Personality – once	(1995)	Won

=== Logies nominated ===
- Gold Logie – 12 times (1984–85, 1987–88, 1990–91, 1993–98)
- Most Popular Light Entertainment Personality – once (1994)
- Most Popular Comedy Personality – once (1997)

== Other work ==
In 1990, Somers played the Billiard Marker in the stage production of The Hunting of the Snark (musical).

In 2013, Somers was announced as part of the performing line-up of Harvest Rain Theatre Company's 2014 season, playing Nicely Nicely Johnson of Guys and Dolls.

In 2025, Somers, despite his age, revealed to many that he boasts an impressive 4 ft vertical leap. "(Source required A.S.A.P)""

== Controversy ==
Despite the enduring popularity of Hey Hey with viewers, in recent years the show has come under criticism for being backward and culturally insensitive, with its outlook and many of its jokes now considered by some commentators to be racist, sexist, and homophobic. The international controversy surrounding the use of blackface in the Jackson Jive sketch on "Red Faces" in 2009 led to the show being derided as "old fashioned, out of touch, stale, [and] misguided". Somers himself had also appeared in brownface or blackface on multiple episodes, including a tribute to the late Ricky May in 1988 and in blackface to make fun of singer and frequent guest Kamahl. In 2021, Somers stated that he believed that some of the content that aired on the show in the past would not be acceptable today due to "political correctness and the cancel culture"; his remarks faced additional criticism.

Kamahl has stated that his ethnicity and background were often the butt of jokes during his appearances on the show, and his treatment was often humiliating. In April 2021, Somers wrote a lengthy apology to Kamahl and to those who found the show's content offensive. Kamahl unreservedly accepted Somers' apology.

== See also ==
- Somers Carroll Productions
- Ernie Carroll

Awards and achievements
Preceded by Rowena Wallace for Sons and Daughters	Gold Logie Award; Most Popular Personality on Australian Television; 1986 for Hey Hey It's Saturday and Blankety Blanks	Succeeded by Ray Martin for Midday
Preceded by Kylie Minogue for Neighbours	Gold Logie Award; Most Popular Personality on Australian Television; 1989 for Hey Hey It's Saturday	Succeeded by Craig McLachlan for Neighbours
