= Bert's Family Feud =

Australian game show

- Bert's Family Feud board game
- Genre: Game show
- Based on: Family Feud by Mark Goodson
- Presented by: Bert Newton
- Starring: Mandy Ritchie; Kathryn Trapani
- Announcer: Paul Khoury; Simon Diaz
- Country of origin: Australia
- Original language: English
- No. of seasons: 2
- No. of episodes: 274 (Regular); 6 (Friday Night All Stars); 280 (Total)

Production
- Executive producers: Michael Pope; Pam Barnes
- Producer: Heather Brooks
- Production locations: Richmond, Victoria
- Running time: 30 minutes (Regular); 60 minutes (Friday Night All-Stars)
- Production companies: Grundy Television (2006); FremantleMedia Australia (2007)

Original release
- Network: Nine Network
- Release: 13 February 2006 – 1 June 2007

Bert's Family Feud was an Australian game show remake based on the American show of the same name. The series was produced by Grundy Television in conjunction with FremantleMedia. It was broadcast on the Nine Network and hosted by Bert Newton. The title refers to host Bert Newton as the show intended to feature celebrities and their families as contestants.

A principal motivation for establishing the show was that the Nine Network had the highest-rated Australian television news service for many years, but had seen its viewing audience abandon the network in favour of the Seven Network's Seven News and Today Tonight. This was not only due to Seven's increasing ratings for its news programming, but also due to their highly successful game show Deal or No Deal, which airs in the 5:30 pm timeslot, leading into the news. Leading up to the program's February 2006 launch, speculation arose that the network may delay the program until mid-year and instead show reruns of Friends in the 5:30 pm timeslot. Network executives were hoping that Friends reruns would reignite the timeslot and allow Bert's Family Feud to premiere.

The show was debuted 13 February 2006, and was then cancelled in 2007. The final episode was taped on 23 May 2007 in the GTV studios in Melbourne and aired on 1 June 2007. In all, 274 episodes were recorded, with the Castricum family being the final contestants, winning $85,000 in total. Despite low ratings, 'the best-of' episodes continued to air on Mondays to fulfill the show's commercial obligations. The Family Feud format was revived in 2014 by Channel 10, hosted by Grant Denyer.

== Gameplay ==
The first two questions of each game were worth regular point values with the third question being worth double points. Unlike previous versions, a family who stole the points would also be credited with the "stealing" answer. If neither family reached 200 points after the third question, a sudden-death face-off would feature the top two answers on the board, each worth triple points. One case occurred where two sudden-death rounds had to be played in the same game because neither family reached 200 points after the first sudden-death round was played. Starting on 3 April 2006, any one of the first three rounds hid a $500 bonus behind any one answer. All departing families received a $1,000 gift voucher.

== Major/bonus round ==
One member of the winning family would answer five questions in 20 seconds. Each top answer from the first player increased the potential jackpot, which started at $5,000, but could be worth $10,000 for one top answer, $15,000 for two, $25,000 for three, $50,000 for four, or $100,000 if only the first player named all five top answers. The second player must then answer the same five questions within 25 seconds, with the condition that the second player's answer to a question must not be the same as the first player's. If both players scored over 200 points together, the family won the jackpot. Each family could remain for up to five nights.

== Friday Night All-Stars ==
From 28 July to 1 September 2006, two teams of sports stars (Australian Football League vs. National Rugby League) competed for their favourite charity. Each began with a bank of $5,000 and played a game called Bullseye. The first members of each team faced off to name the most popular answer to the first question. The first player to buzz in answered the question first. The top answer added $500 to that team's Bullseye bank, otherwise the other player named a different answer. After the first question, the second players from each team faced off on the $1,000 question, the third players played the $1,500 question, and the last players played the $2,000 question. On the second All-Stars episode from 4 August 2006, the first three regular rounds scored regular values and the fourth round scored triple points. The format changed to double points in the third and fourth rounds on 11 August but reverted to the single-single-single-triple format thereafter. The highest-scoring team after four rounds won the game. In the jackpot round, one top answer from the first player increased their Bullseye bank to $15,000, two increased the jackpot to $20,000 with the rest of the aforementioned payout structure remaining the same.

== Female models ==
This was the only version to feature two female models (i.e. Mandy Ritchie and Kathryn Trapani respectively) mainly known as Mandy & Kandy, which could have been inspired by the Mexican versions of Family Feud, mainly 100 Mexicanos Dijeron and ¿Qué dice la gente?.

== Controversy ==
Just four years before Steve Harvey hosted the show in 2010, this version has spawned controversial answers within raunchy questions such as "Name a gift that is hard to return" which featured references to sex and a vibrator on the 30 June 2006 episode as one responded "Look, this is a pretty filthy answer but it's all I can think of and there are some dirty people out there in the audience so I'm going to go with vibrator". Another episode that aired on 27 June has a question "Name an activity that is enjoyed in nudist colonies" in which a contestant responded to "sex". On 4 September 2007 the Australian Communications and Media Authority founded that "The impact of the sexual references is very mild and can be accommodated within a G (general) classification" they also found that the network has failed to respond to the complaint within 30 days but had implemented new procedures to ensure it complied with complaints-handling obligations.

== Merchandise ==
A board game by Crown & Andrews, a DVD game by Imagination Entertainment, and a mobile game by BlueSkyFrog were all released in 2006.

== Cast ==
- Bert Newton – host
- Paul Khoury – announcer (2006)
- Simon Diaz – announcer (2007)
- Mandy Ritchie – co-hostess known as "Mandy"
- Kathryn Trapani – co-hostess, known as "Kandy"

== New Zealand broadcasting ==
In New Zealand, the show began screening on TV2 on Monday 8 January 2007.
