= Bob Tarlau =

- Born: January 6, 1944 (age 81)
- Occupation(s): Radio correspondent TV news writer (retired); TV news producer (retired)

Robert (Bob) Tarlau (born January 6, 1944) is a retired American television news writer and producer and current radio correspondent, who lives in Los Angeles, USA. Tarlau attended California State University, Northridge and earned a BA, Journalism (1963–1965).

== Television career ==
Bob Tarlau's first job was at KTLA Channel 5 in Los Angeles in 1965 working alongside the legendary Stan Chambers.

Tarlau retired from television in January 2010 after 46 years as a news writer and producer. His most recent TV news position was as a senior news producer for KTTV (FOX11) a Fox television network station. He had worked previously for KABC-TV, KTLA and KNXT (now KCBS-TV) in Los Angeles and for Australia's Nine Network, both in Sydney and Los Angeles.

== Radio ==
Tarlau continues his long-running association with the Australian media, as a U.S. correspondent for Melbourne radio station 3AW. He is heard weekday mornings on 3AW Breakfast with Ross Stevenson and Russel Howcroft, and overnight weekdays on Nine Radio's networked radio program Australia Overnight. He also covers American news for 6PR Perth's Breakfast show. Please see www.tarlau.com for streaming air times.

== Awards and recognition ==
In 2000 Bob was recognised by the Greater Los Angeles Chapter of the Society of Professional Journalists for his accomplishments over the course of his career in broadcast journalism.

He has received numerous Los Angeles-area Emmy Awards and has been honored by the Southern California Radio Television News Association and the Los Angeles Press Club.

In 2011, Tarlau was inducted into the Associated Press Television Radio Association of California Hall of Fame.

== Personal life ==
Bob is married to Barbara Tarlau and they have a son David and Bob has a daughter Amanda from a previous marriage.
