= Billy Baxter (song) =

- 7" single label

Single by Paul Kelly and the Dots

from the album Talk
- A-side: "Billy Baxter"
- B-side: "Hard Knocks"
- Released: 20 October 1980
- Recorded: 1980; AAV Studios, Melbourne
- Genre: Rock, ska
- Length: 2:43
- Label: Mushroom
- Songwriters: Paul Kelly, Chris Langman
- Producer: Joe Camilleri

Paul Kelly and the Dots singles chronology
"Seeing Is Believing" (1980)	"Billy Baxter" (1980)	"Midnight Express" (1981)

Audio sample
- file; help

"Billy Baxter" is a song by Australian rock group Paul Kelly and the Dots, released on 20 October 1980 as the lead single from the album Talk (1981). It was written by band members Paul Kelly and Chris Langman. It peaked at No. 38 on the Australian Kent Music Report Singles Chart. The song was produced by Joe Camilleri (from Jo Jo Zep & The Falcons) for Mushroom Records. In early November the group performed the track on national pop music TV show, Countdown – it was Kelly's first TV appearance. The song's subject, Billy Baxter, is an Australian musician and was a long term member of Coodabeens Footy Show on ABC Radio National.

== Background ==
Paul Kelly and the Dots had formed in August 1978 in Melbourne from the remains of High Rise Bombers, the Dots underwent line-up changes prior to the release of "Billy Baxter". Their debut single "Recognition" was issued in 1979, under the name The Dots, on an independent label, but had no chart success. "Recognition" line-up were Kelly (vocals), Chris Langman (guitars), Chris Worrall (guitars), Alan Brooker (bass guitar) and John Lloyd (drums). More changes occurred; they signed to Mushroom Records and released "Billy Baxter" on 20 October 1980, which peaked at No. 38 on the Australian Kent Music Report Singles Chart. In early November that year, Paul Kelly & the Dots performed "Billy Baxter" on the national pop music TV show, Countdown – it was Kelly's first appearance on television.

Their debut album, Talk followed in March 1981 and peaked at No. 44 on the related albums chart. Kelly was later dissatisfied with his earliest albums: "I wish I could grab the other two and put 'em in a big hole".

The subject of the song, Billy Baxter, is an Australian vocalist (ex-Ghetto Blasters, Big Fans of Jesus, The Hollow Men and solo). He was a Disc Jockey on Melbourne community radio station 3RRR and has been a long-term member of the Coodabeens Footy Show on several Melbourne radio stations since 1981 (3RRR, several versions of ABC and 3AW). Kelly said, "Billy is a very entertaining person. I used quite a bit of him in the song, but it was never meant to be accurately biographical of Billy."

The B-side to the single, "Hard Knocks", was featured in the soundtrack of the 1980 AFI Award nominated film of the same name.

On the Australia Day (26 January) long week-end in 1982, Kelly performed the song at the Mushroom Evolution Concert backed by Jo Jo Zep & The Falcons. The concert celebrated Mushroom Records' 10th anniversary and was held at the Myer Music Bowl. The song appeared on both the triple LP and the video release of the concert of the same name.

== Composition and recording ==
"Billy Baxter" is a ska-influenced song of two minutes and forty-three seconds. It was written by Paul Kelly and Chris Langman. From 1977 to 1978 Kelly and Langman had shared a house in the Melbourne suburb of South Yarra, where, according to Kelly, "Chris and I sat around for hours, days playing guitars ... I played him my new songs as they kept coming and we made up tunes together". Kelly and Langman also co-wrote "Leaps and Bounds", which appeared on Paul Kelly and the Coloured Girls' album Gossip (1986). According to the lyrics, Billy Baxter's attributes include: lost limitations, imitations, a thousand faces, a lover, a gambler, a lesson for all the crew, a hungry heart, love to burn, in love with abandon but never loses control, walks right through disaster and still whole, plays pantomimes.

Kelly had met Joe Camilleri (from Jo Jo Zep & The Falcons) when the latter was looking for someone to co-write songs with; Kelly gave Camilleri "Only the Lonely Heart" (a.k.a. "Only the Lonely Hearted") and "Hand Me Down". Camilleri recommended Kelly to Mushroom Records and put up the money to produce the group's debut album, Talk. The song was produced by Camilleri for Mushroom Records. Kelly remembered, "I'd done my back badly and couldn't stand or sit for any length of time, so I had to do my vocals lying on the floor... If I could gather up every copy of that first record and bury them all in a big hole, I would. But that's no fault of Joe's". The B-side, "Hard Knocks", was produced by Trevor Lucas (of United Kingdom folk group Fairport Convention).

== Reception ==
Reviewed at the time of release in Roadrunner, the song was deemed, "Unlistenable. A sort of reggae David Watts/Billy Hunt, it reeks of a calculated attempt at commercial success."

== Track listing ==
No.	Title	Writer(s)	Length
1.	"Billy Baxter"	Paul Kelly, Chris Langman	2:43
2.	"Hard Knocks"	Kelly	3:54

== Personnel ==
Paul Kelly and the Dots members

- Paul Kelly – vocals
- Paul Gadsby – bass guitar
- Chris Langman – guitars
- John Lloyd – drums
- Chris Worrall – guitars
- Chris Dyson – guitar, vocals
- Tony Thornton – drums
- Alan Brooker – bass guitar
- Tim Brosnan – guitar
- Michael Holmes – guitar

Recording details

- Producer – Joe Camilleri ("Billy Baxter"), Trevor Lucas ("Hard Knocks")
  - Remixer – Camilleri ("Hard Knocks"), Jim Barton ("Billy Baxter")
- Engineer – Jim Barton
- Studio – AAV Australia, Melbourne

== Charts ==
Chart (1980)	Peak position
Australian (Kent Music Report)	38
