= Darren James (broadcaster) =

Australian radio broadcaster

- Born: 7 December 1960 (age 65)
- Education: Blackburn High School
- Occupations: Radio presenter, corporate host
- Employer: 3AW

Darren Andrew James (born 7 December 1960) is a long-established Australian radio broadcaster on Melbourne radio station 3AW where he first started working in October 1979. He is also an MC and hosts corporate and public events. A passionate adventure motorcyclist he is known to his cohort as "Afterburner"

== Career ==
James's radio career began in October 1979, when he started as an 'office boy' at 3AW. In that year he moved to a role as an audio engineer for 'Breakfast' and 'The Derryn Hinch Program', and in 1986 commenced on-air as co-host of the 3AW Breakfast Show with Uncle Roy (aka Bruce Mansfield), until 1990.

In 1990–1991 James co-hosted (with Bruce Mansfield) 3AK's breakfast program and in 1991, moved to TTFM where he co-hosted 'Breakfast' with Jane Holmes for a year and then was a general presenter there until 1994, when he rejoined 3AW.

Since 1994, James has hosted twelve hours of 3AW programming on Saturday and Sunday mornings with 'Buy, Swap and Sell', the 'Big Backyard', 'The Big House' and the 'Sunday Morning' program. James has also appeared every week on the light-hearted one-hour feature Friday Lunch, starting in 1996 with Ernie Sigley when Sigley was the afternoon host, and since November 2008, with Denis Walter's afternoon program, along with Andrew McLaren.

Since 1994, James has been the almost-permanent fill-in on 3AW Breakfast show co-host, firstly with Ian Cover, and then from 1996, with Tony Leonard covering for Ross Stevenson and John Burns when they are on leave, usually for eight weeks per year. The exception was the December 2013 – January 2014 summer break when James hosted 3AW's afternoon show whilst Denis Walter took a break. For that period, Peter Maher took the breakfast shift with Tony Leonard.

James was a regular contributor to the radio comedy team 'The Coodabeen Champions' when they were on 3AW from the late 1970s to the 1990s. Darren provided character voices for the Coodabeen's phone-in segments.

During his long career James has been part of broadcasts from many parts of the world including London, New York, Los Angeles, San Francisco, Ethiopia, Beijing, Hong Kong, Singapore, the Sudan, India and Alice Springs, while co-hosting 'Breakfast' with Bruce Mansfield and as the audio engineer for fellow broadcaster Derryn Hinch.

James is also an MC and hosts corporate and public events including gatherings of the AFL Collingwood Football Club coterie group, 'The Woodsmen'.

== Personal life ==
James is the son of veteran radio performer, the late Peter James, who worked in radio for around 30 years, including 17 years at 3AW.

Darren is married to Kathy (Kathryn Hopper James), a former television presenter, and they live in the eastern suburbs of Melbourne. They have two adult children, Michael and Alice. Following in the family tradition, Michael is a content and executive producer and has worked at 3AW and Triple M and Alice James is a producer who has worked at Triple M and KIIS 1011.

James is a keen photographer and gardener.

== Interests ==
James is a 'one-eyed' Collingwood Football Club supporter.
