= List of Gruen episodes =

Australian television program focusing on advertising

Gruen (previously known as The Gruen Transfer) is an Australian television program focusing on advertising, which debuted on the ABC on 28 May 2008. The program is hosted by Wil Anderson and produced by Andrew Denton's production company, Zapruder's Other Films, now part of CJZ. Anderson is accompanied by a panel of advertising industry experts including Russel Howcroft (originally of George Patterson Y&R) and Todd Sampson (previously of Leo Burnett).

== Series overview ==
Series	Title	Episodes		Originally released	
Series	Title	Episodes		First released	Last released
1	The Gruen Transfer	10		28 May 2008	30 July 2008
2	The Gruen Transfer	10		18 March 2009	20 May 2009
3	The Gruen Transfer	16	6	16 June 2010	21 July 2010
3	Gruen Nation	16	4	28 July 2010	18 August 2010
3	The Gruen Transfer	16	6	25 August 2010	29 September 2010
4	The Gruen Transfer	16	8	3 August 2011	21 September 2011
4	Gruen Planet	16	8	28 September 2011	16 November 2011
5	Gruen Sweat	14	4	25 July 2012	15 August 2012
5	Gruen Planet	14	10	22 August 2012	24 October 2012
6	Gruen Nation	12	4	14 August 2013	4 September 2013
6	Gruen Planet	12	8	11 September 2013	30 October 2013
7	Gruen	10		9 September 2015	11 November 2015
8	Gruen	10		3 August 2016	5 October 2016
9	Gruen	10		13 September 2017	16 October 2017
10	Gruen	10		2 May 2018	4 July 2018
11	Gruen	10		25 September 2019	27 November 2019
12	Gruen	10		14 October 2020	16 December 2020
13	Gruen	10		13 October 2021	15 December 2021
14	Gruen Nation	10	2	11 May 2022	18 May 2022
14	Gruen	10	8	7 June 2022	27 July 2022
15	Gruen	9		21 June 2023	16 August 2023
16	Gruen	10		15 May 2024	18 July 2024
17	Gruen Nation	12	2	30 April 2025	7 May 2025
17	Gruen	12	10	14 May 2025	16 July 2025
18	Gruen	12		29 April 2026	15 July 2026

== Episodes ==
=== Series 1 (2008) ===
No. overall	No. in season	Topic(s)	The Pitch	Original release date	Viewers
1	1	Beer	Whale meat	28 May 2008	1,287,000
2	2	Underwear	Holidaying in Baghdad	4 June 2008	1,273,000
3	3	Banks	Celibacy	11 June 2008	1,121,000
4	4	Chocolate	The Democrat Party	18 June 2008	1,204,000
5	5	Four-wheel drives	Pro-plastic bags	25 June 2008	1,182,000
6	6	Feminine hygiene	Pro-child labour	2 July 2008	1,058,000
7	7	Road safety	Invade New Zealand	9 July 2008	1,302,000
8	8	Telcos	Pro-Global warming	16 July 2008	1,314,000
9	9	Skin care	Buy Nothing Day	23 July 2008	1,386,000
10	10	Cannes	Stop Australian tourism	30 July 2008	1,456,000

=== Series 2 (2009) ===
No. overall	No. in season	Topic(s)	The Pitch	Original release date	Viewers
11	1	Australia	Pro-nuclear power	18 March 2009	1,120,000
12	2	Oral hygiene	Hating Don Bradman	25 March 2009	1,151,000
13	3	Bottled water	Selling ice to Eskimos	1 April 2009	976,000
14	4	Petrol	Synchronised swimming for males	8 April 2009	1,087,000
15	5	Weight loss	Donate to CEOs	15 April 2009	1,212,000
16	6	Breakfast cereal	Plastic surgery for children	22 April 2009	1,244,000
17	7	Tobacco	Give the 2012 Summer Olympics to Australia	29 April 2009	1,226,000
18	8	"Yourself" (CEOs appearing in their own companies' advertising)	Cane toads as pets	6 May 2009	1,211,000
19	9	Meat	Fat pride (removed from broadcast edition)	13 May 2009	1,239,000
20	10	Hamburgers	Ban public holidays	20 May 2009	1,312,000

=== Series 3 (2010) ===
No. overall	No. in season	Topic(s)	Original release date	Viewers
21	1	Cleaning products	16 June 2010	1,177,000
22	2	FIFA World Cup	23 June 2010	1,227,000
23	3	MasterChef Australia	30 June 2010	1,407,000
24	4	Deodorant	7 July 2010	1,197,000
25	5	3D television	14 July 2010	1,341,000
26	6	"Non-drinking"	21 July 2010	1,280,000
27	7	Gruen Nation (2010 Australian federal election)	28 July 2010	1,600,000
28	8	Gruen Nation (Australian federal election, 2010)	4 August 2010	1,503,000
29	9	Gruen Nation (Australian federal election, 2010)	11 August 2010	1,571,000
30	10	Gruen Nation (Australian federal election, 2010)	18 August 2010	1,540,000
31	11	Milk	25 August 2010	1,358,000
32	12	Shaving	1 September 2010	1,391,000
33	13	Religion	8 September 2010	1,482,000
34	14	Insurance	15 September 2010	1,407,000
35	15	Infomercials	22 September 2010	1,448,000
36	16	Airlines	29 September 2010	1,403,000

=== Series 4 (2011) ===
The first eight episodes in 2011 were branded The Gruen Transfer; from the ninth episode, they were titled Gruen Planet.

No. overall	No. in season	Topic(s)	Original release date	Viewers
37	1	Supermarkets	3 August 2011	1,072,000
38	2	Banks (part 2)	10 August 2011	1,114,000
39	3	Animal rights, pillows	17 August 2011	1,120,000
40	4	Condoms	24 August 2011	1,017,000
41	5	Snack bars	31 August 2011	1,165,000
42	6	Billboards	7 September 2011	1,164,000
43	7	Shampoo	14 September 2011	1,269,000
44	8	Sports betting	21 September 2011	1,162,000
45	9	Foreign-owned beer brands	28 September 2011	1,138,000
46	10	Breast Cancer Awareness Month	5 October 2011	1,130,000
47	11	Apple Inc.	12 October 2011	1,023,000
48	12	British royal family	19 October 2011	1,110,000
49	13	Hungry Jack's	26 October 2011	1,160,000
50	14	Qantas	2 November 2011	1,050,000
51	15	Kim Kardashian	9 November 2011	1,180,000
52	16	Tiger Woods, Islam	16 November 2011	1,170,000

=== Series 5 (2012) ===
No. overall	No. in season	Topic(s)	Original release date	Viewers
53	1	Gruen Sweat (2012 Summer Olympics)	25 July 2012	931,000
54	2	Gruen Sweat (2012 Summer Olympics)	1 August 2012	793,000
55	3	Gruen Sweat (2012 Summer Olympics)	8 August 2012	794,000
56	4	Gruen Sweat (2012 Summer Olympics)	15 August 2012	918,000
57	5	Crown Casino	22 August 2012	906,000
58	6	Doug Pitt	29 August 2012	810,000
59	7	Lance Armstrong	5 September 2012	917,000
60	8	"IheartRine..."	12 September 2012	939,000
61	9	People smuggling	19 September 2012	946,000
62	10	iPhone 5	26 September 2012	913,000
63	11	Alan Jones	3 October 2012	1,023,000
64	12	Church of Scientology	10 October 2012	997,000
65	13	Newspapers	17 October 2012	1,018,000
66	14	Red Bull Stratos	24 October 2012	1,038,000

=== Series 6 (2013) ===
No. overall	No. in season	Topic(s)	Original release date	Viewers
67	1	Gruen Nation (2013 Australian federal election)	14 August 2013	1,028,000
68	2	Gruen Nation (Australian federal election, 2013)	21 August 2013	1,052,000
69	3	Gruen Nation (Australian federal election, 2013)	28 August 2013	1,045,000
70	4	Gruen Nation (Australian federal election, 2013)	4 September 2013	1,179,000
71	5	One Direction	11 September 2013	1,128,000
72	6	iPhone	18 September 2013	988,000
73	7	MasterChef Australia	25 September 2013	908,000
74	8	"Candid Camera"	2 October 2013	784,000
75	9	Prince Harry	9 October 2013	884,000
76	10	"Against Coca-Cola"	16 October 2013	909,000
77	11	Alcohol	23 October 2013	1,070,000
78	12	Same-sex marriage	30 October 2013	1,004,000

=== Series 7 (2015) ===
No. overall	No. in season	Topic(s)	Original release date	Viewers
79	1	Pet food	9 September 2015	974,000
80	2	Uber, Ashley Madison	16 September 2015	915,000
81	3	Aldi Süd; Etihad Airways (with Nicole Kidman)	23 September 2015	900,000
82	4	Pope Francis	30 September 2015	917,000
83	5	AFL and NRL Grand Finals	7 October 2015	926,000
84	6	Anti-advertising	14 October 2015	902,000
85	7	Nuclear weapons	21 October 2015	904,000
86	8	Multi-national company tax	28 October 2015	904,000
87	9	Star Wars	4 November 2015	897,000
88	10	Christmas advertising	11 November 2015	948,000

=== Series 8 (2016) ===
No. overall	No. in season	Topic(s)	Original release date	Viewers
89	1	Coffee, Telstra	3 August 2016	954,000
90	2	Sponsorship of the Olympic Games	10 August 2016	865,000
91	3	2016 Australian census, Organ donation	17 August 2016	829,000
92	4	Superannuation, Fitness First	24 August 2016	927,000
93	5	"Dad-vertising", "We're the Superhumans" (2016 Summer Paralympics campaign)	31 August 2016	901,000
94	6	Sugar, "awareness campaigns"	7 September 2016	830,000
95	7	Funerals, men's fragrances	14 September 2016	815,000
96	8	Plebiscite, Samsung	21 September 2016	832,000
97	9	Fruit, feminine hygiene	28 September 2016	796,000
98	10	Lamb, banks	5 October 2016	832,000

=== Series 9 (2017) ===
No. overall	No. in season	Topic(s)	Original release date	Viewers
99	1	National Broadband Network, hipsters	13 September 2017	903,000
100	2	Online dating, Apple Watch	20 September 2017	773,000
101	3	Australian Marriage Law Postal Survey, racism	27 September 2017	793,000
102	4	Big banks, Shopkins	4 October 2017	806,000
103	5	Eggs, BHP	11 October 2017	838,000
104	6	Amazon, McHappy Day	18 October 2017	813,000
105	7	Gender pay gap, Hillsong Church	25 October 2017	849,000
106	8	Wine industry, Internet piracy	1 November 2017	816,000
107	9	AI assistants, Streets (ice cream)	8 November 2017	840,000
108	10	Taylor Swift’s album Reputation, headaches	15 November 2017	718,000

=== Series 10 (2018) ===
No. overall	No. in season	Topic(s)	Original release date	Viewers
109	1	Westpac, Coca-Cola No Sugar	2 May 2018	862,000
110	2	Facebook, Tourism Australia's Dundee campaign	9 May 2018	841,000
111	3	Chemist Warehouse, David Warner	16 May 2018	897,000
112	4	Ancestry.com, Woman's Day	23 May 2018	784,000
113	5	Bed mattress advertisements, Animals Australia	30 May 2018	825,000
114	6	Medibank, IKEA "Plant Bullying"	6 June 2018	764,000
115	7	Hair regrowth services, Amazon	13 June 2018	877,000
116	8	Uber Eats, Bowel Cancer Australia	20 June 2018	881,000
117	9	Allen's (confectionery); End of Financial Year Sales	27 June 2018	809,000
118	10	Phase-out of lightweight plastic bags by Coles and Woolworths; use of ASMR in advertising	4 July 2018	785,000

=== Series 11 (2019) ===
No. overall	No. in season	Topic(s)	Original release date	Viewers
119	1	Supermarket Collectables; Google's New Campaign	25 September 2019	855,000
120	2	Banking Royal Commission; KFC	2 October 2019	874,000
121	3	Department Stores; Big Vitamin	9 October 2019	825,000
122	4	Influencers; Mental health	16 October 2019	827,000
123	5	Milk and Milk Substitutes; Ineos 1:59 Challenge	23 October 2019	730,000
124	6	Domestic tourism; Spring Racing PR Crisis	30 October 2019	695,000
125	7	Greenwashing; Birdsnesting; Tourism Australia's Philausophy Campaign	6 November 2019	744,000
126	8	Food delivery; The Heart Foundation	13 November 2019	741,000
127	9	Streaming Wars; Australia Post	20 November 2019	732,000
128	10	Alcohol Marketing; Lay-by	27 November 2019	749,000

=== Series 12 (2020) ===
No. overall	No. in season	Topic(s)	Original release date	Viewers
129	1	Coronavirus messaging, TikTok and office space	14 October 2020	1,037,000
130	2	Soap, Bushfire campaign, Paywalls	21 October 2020	831,000
131	3	Bunnings, essential workers, RM Williams	28 October 2020	891,000
132	4	Tourism, McDonald's vs Hungry Jack's, cancel culture	4 November 2020	746,000
133	5	Beer, Getting Active vs Being Lazy, Billboards	11 November 2020	732,000
134	6	Chooks, Telco 5G and The arts	18 November 2020	666,000
135	7	Kmart, Cash vs cashless card and video games	25 November 2020	732,000
136	8	Black Friday, Christmas, phone privacy	2 December 2020	725,000
137	9	Gyms, Allen’s Lollies and Black Lives Matter	9 December 2020	698,000
138	10	Review of 2020 commercials	16 December 2020	638,000

=== Series 13 (2021) ===
No. overall	No. in season	Topic(s)	Original release date	Viewers
139	1	COVID-19 vaccine rollout, Airlines, Bunnings, Balenciaga's collaboration with The Simpsons	13 October 2021	657,000
140	2	The Wiggles, Amazon and online delivery, Primo Scrambles	20 October 2021	702,000
141	3	Sports betting, Wrigley's Extra, kissing	27 October 2021	647,000
142	4	Meta, Electric cars, Insurance	3 November 2021	642,000
143	5	Grill'd, McDonald's, BTS partnerships, Bottled water	10 November 2021	577,000
144	6	Buy Now, Pay Later services, Online share trade, Sunglasses	17 November 2021	618,000
145	7	Lego and Salmon	24 November 2021	539,000
146	8	Black Friday, Christmas and Novelty Flavours	1 December 2021	573,000
147	9	Chanel, Summer campaigns and the skincare industry	8 December 2021	468,000
148	10	Review of 2021 commercials	15 December 2021	526,000

=== Series 14 (2022) ===
No. overall	No. in season	Topic(s)	Original release date	Viewers
149	1	Gruen Nation (2022 Australian federal election)	11 May 2022	588,000
150	2	Gruen Nation (Australian federal election, 2022)	18 May 2022	559,000
151	3	KFC, Top Gun and US military, Australian Defence Force, ASIO, sex toys	8 June 2022	491,000
152	4	McCafé, service stations, Respect domestic violence campaign	15 June 2022	619,000
153	5	Underwear, Bunnings and The Good Guys use of facial recognition technology, Mitre 10	22 June 2022	501,000
154	6	Menulog, pet food and pet wellness, Museum of Old and New Art, reviews	29 June 2022	524,000
155	7	ABC 90th anniversary, Play School and Bluey toys, disinfectants and hygiene	6 July 2022	536,000
156	8	Use of puppets in advertising, Cruise industry, celebrity collaborations, meal kits, protein diet	13 July 2022	416,000
157	9	Bunnings, Real estate industry, Lifestyle resorts, Country branding and sport, 2022 FIFA World Cup and David Beckham	20 July 2022	519,000
158	10	Best of 2022 commercials (so far)	27 July 2022	510,000

=== Series 15 (2023) ===
No. overall	No. in season	Topic(s)	Original release date	Viewers
159	1	Cars and utes, anti-vaping	21 June 2023	436,000
160	2	Sports betting, gambling and optometrists	28 June 2023	532,000
161	3	Supermarkets and cost of living, The Reject Shop, Spudshed and Who Gives A Crap toilet paper	5 July 2023	484,000
162	4	Barbie and employment websites	12 July 2023	415,000
163	5	Bed and mattress advertisements, sleep products, Sam Kerr and the FIFA Women's World Cup	19 July 2023	427,000
164	6	Soft drinks and energy drinks, insurance and natural disasters	26 July 2023	458,000
165	7	Security in telcos, banks and Google, company rebrands and Animals Australia and pork	2 August 2023	480,000
166	8	Dyson and Philips air purifiers, Fujitsu and Panasonic air conditioners, Solo and Temu	9 August 2023	514,000
167	9	Best of 2023 commercials (so far)	16 August 2023	215,000

=== Series 16 (2024) ===
No. overall	No. in season	Topic(s)	Original release date	Viewers
168	1	Hubbl, Telstra, Rest Super, Apple, Kia	15 May 2024	751,000
169	2	Smith's Chips, South Australia Police's driving and mobile phones campaign, Samsung, Nurofen and Michael Hill Jewellers	22 May 2024	702,000
170	3	WorkSafe Victoria, McDonald's, Fructis Hair Drink, Suzuki, World Down Syndrome Day, older influencers	29 May 2024	667,000
171	4	Virgin Australia, Twisties, LG, Amazon Prime Video and the 2024 T20 World Cup, Bumble and online dating	5 June 2024	603,000
172	5	Toyota, Telstra, Unloan, Extra, Bowel Cancer Australia, Crocs	12 June 2024	725,000
173	6	Demazin, Spriggy, Allianz Australia, Google and Gemini, Speedo	19 June 2024	795,000
174	7	Mitsubishi, Ancestry, Australian Retirement Trust, Tourism Tasmania, violence against women respect campaign, Subway	26 June 2024	562,000
175	8	KenoGo, Coles Simply, SA Health and Healthdirect Australia, Dynamo, MrBeast and Feastables, ABC iview	3 July 2024	727,000
176	9	Nintendo Switch, Brita, eHarmony, Peninsula Grammar, Dove	10 July 2024	717,000
177	10	Lynx, Pilot, Samsung's Circle to Search, Woolworths, Gina Rinehart and Olympic team sponsorships, Colorbond	17 July 2024	566,000

=== Series 17 (2025) ===
No. overall	No. in season	Topic(s)	Original release date	Viewers
178	1	Gruen Nation (2025 Australian federal election)	30 April 2025	809,000
179	2	Gruen Nation (Australian federal election, 2025)	7 May 2025	800,000
180	3	Bankwest, Bonds, Married at First Sight and Bic, Kia, Opal HealthCare	14 May 2025	720,000
181	4	KFC, Puma, SBS 50th Anniversary, Jetstar, Labubu	21 May 2025	667,000
182	5	Microsoft Copilot, Allianz, IKEA, White Fox, Volvo EX90, Western Australia Police Force, Hooleys	27 May 2025	634,000
183	6	Telstra, REA Group, Juniper, Life360, Dr. Squatch Sydney Sweeney soap	3 June 2025	682,000
184	7	Aldi Süd, CLR, Airbnb, Frank Green, FightMND, Golden Crumpets	June 10, 2025	729,000
185	8	Swisse, Wise, Big W, XXXX, Poise, Colgate purple serum	June 17, 2025	605,000
186	9	Stihl, Westpac, Kleenex luxury tissues, Woolworths, Amaysim, TikTok	June 24, 2025	634,000
187	10	Infomercials, Kia Tasman, Nutri-Grain, Toblerone, Bioglan, Shane Warne Legacy	July 1, 2025	715,000
188	11	South Australia Police, Rexona, Liquid I.V., Selena Gomez signature Oreo, Akubra, Modibodi	July 8, 2025	582,000
189	12	Particle face cream, Petbarn, Commonwealth Bank, Royal Kingdom, Punirunes, Malibu (rum)	July 16, 2025	688,000

=== Series 18 (2026) ===
No. overall	No. in season	Topic(s)	The Pitch	Original release date	Viewers
190	1	Vaseline; Westpac; Woolworths; McDonald's x KPop Demon Hunters; Hallow; Jeanswest	E-bike gangs	29 April 2026	N/A
191	2	Tyra Banks's Hot SMiZE Cream; Amazon (ad with Steph Tisdell); 7-Eleven's blind boxes; CHANEL 25 (dir. Michel Gondry); Zespri red kiwifruit; Brick app	Inflation	6 May 2026	N/A
192	3	Jingles; BYD; Dyson HushJet; Juca baby food; Road Safety Commission PSA; Gippsland Dairy yogurt	Nuclear weapons	13 May 2026	N/A
193	4	TikTok AI scams; Coles pricing; DiDi; Heinz tomato sauce; Swisse gummies; Honda Prelude (dir. Justin Kurzel)	Microplastics	20 May 2026	N/A
194	5	TikTok sleep aid ads; Colgate Antarctica ad with Cas and Jonesy; Yoto; ChatGPT; Australian avocados (ad with Eddie Williams); IVF Australia sperm donations	Drinking culture	27 May 2026	N/A
195	6	Real estate agents; John West salmon; perimenopause; eBay; Norco milk; Asics	Ban ladders for men aged over 50	3 June 2026	N/A
196	7	Ads featuring David Beckham; Seasol fertiliser; GWM Tank 300; Big W; Adidas World Cup (ad with Timothée Chalamet); Neighbourhood Watch Victoria PSA	New football chant for Australia	10 June 2026	N/A
197	8	Bird Island; Tinder Astrology Mode; Cuddly laundry rinse; Yo-Chi; Tip Top The One bread; SBS World Cup (ad with Nick Mohammed)	Fur clothing	17 June 2026	N/A
198	9	Aldi Süd; Apple iPhone+Apple Watch; Chartered Accountants; Skyn condoms; Nescafé; La Roche Posay x Minions	Marriage contracts that expire after seven years	24 June 2026	N/A
199	10	TBC	TBC	1 July 2026	N/A
200	11	TBC	TBC	8 July 2026	N/A
201	12	TBC	TBC	15 July 2026	N/A
