= Tony Leonard =

Australian radio presenter (born 1955)

- Born: 15 December 1955 (age 69)
- Occupation: Radio Presenter
- Employer(s): 3AW, Crocmedia, Ace Radio Network

Anthony Leonard (born 19 December 1955) is an Australian radio presenter.

== Career ==
In 1982, he joined the radio comedy team Coodabeen Champions, who were then on 3RRR. Following them to 3LO and 3AW he stayed with this team until 2002.

He began commentating AFL matches on 3AW in 1996 and he used to present a Saturday morning 3AW show called "Glossing Over" with Trevor Marmalade and Dr. Turf, until it was axed on 21 June 2007, following 3AW's poor ratings in the football timeslots.

Since 1995, Leonard has appeared every Friday on Neil Mitchell's morning 3AW program in a segment called "3AW Pub of the Week", reviewing hotels around Melbourne and surrounding areas.

Leonard is a long-serving member of 3AW's AFL football commentary team mainly calling on Saturday Nights and Sundays. He is also a program contributor on the Ace Radio network and works for Crocmedia on a program called "Sportsday Victoria".

Leonard, with co-host Darren James, is also the alternate 3AW breakfast show host when Ross Stevenson and John Burns are on leave, usually averaging eight weeks per year in this role.

== Personal life ==
Leonard is married and has children. He was originally from Footscray, Victoria.
