= 3AW Breakfast =

Australian radio show

- Genre: Radio show
- Running time: 180 minutes Monday - Friday; 5:30am – 8:30am
- Country of origin: Australia
- Language: English
- Hosted by: Ross Stevenson; Russel Howcroft
- Produced by: Damian Tardio; Sophie Klemens; Maya van Es
- Executive producer: Mark Davidson
- Original release: 1990
- Audio format: Stereo
- Website: 3AW Breakfast

3AW Breakfast is an Australian breakfast radio show hosted by Ross Stevenson and Russel Howcroft on 3AW in Melbourne. A daily podcast of the morning's show is also produced.

== History ==
In 1989, Ross Stevenson, Denis Connell and anchor Dean Banks joined 3AW from 3AK after building a cult following. The breakfast show was initially named Lawyers, Guns and Money. Connell was sacked in 1991 by program director Steve Price and the show was rebranded to Breakfast with Ross and Dean.

For the following 10 years, Stevenson and Banks established themselves and their style as a ratings success. In December 2000, Banks decided to retire, again leaving Stevenson to find a new partner.

In 2001, John Burns joined Ross Stevenson as co-host following the retirement of Dean Banks. Breakfast with Ross and John was the station's top rating program.

In June 2020, 3AW announced that Howcroft will join as co-host from Monday 3 August, following John Burns' retirement from radio.

== Hosts ==
The show has featured multiple hosts since 1989, and a rotating group of fill‑ins contributing throughout its history.

Host	Years active	Notes
Ross Stevenson	1989–present	Joined from 3AK; continuous main host.
Denis Connell	1989–1991	Co-host during Lawyers, Guns and Money; dismissed in 1991.
Dean Banks	1989–2000	Anchor and later co-host; retired December 2000.
John Burns	2001–2020	Joined after Banks’ retirement; retired mid‑2020.
Russel Howcroft	2020–present	Joined 3 August 2020 after Burns’ retirement.

Jimmy Bartel and Mark Allen are current fill-in hosts of the show.

Over the years, Emily Power, Stephen Quartermain, Kate Stevenson, Tony Leonard, Darren James, Jacqueline Felgate and Peter Maher have been previous fill-in hosts of the show.

== Regular Segments ==
- The Rumour File - Listeners are encouraged to call in and anonymously spill the beans and break the news. The segment airs weekdays at 7:07am.
- US & UK Report - Barbara Tarlau provides an update on what's happening in the United States and Gavin Grey provides an update what's happening in the United Kingdom. The segment airs weekdays at 6:45am
- What The Papers Say - Ross and Russel cover the news headlines from the newspapers.
- Sport Report with Jon Anderson - Herald Sun's Jon Anderson provides sport updates throughout the show. The segment airs weekdays at 7:25am.
- Entertainment with Peter Ford - Showbiz reporter Peter Ford has the latest entertainment news. The segment airs on Monday and Thursday at 8:20am.
- Food with Kara Monssen - Kara Monssen reviews the latest restaurants around Melbourne. The segment airs Friday morning at 8:15am.
- By Friday - Listeners make predictions on a Monday on things that will or won’t happen by Friday.
