= Danger: Low Brow =

Danger: Low Brow was a comedy show on Melbourne radio station 3RRR from 1985 to 1991, before moving to Triple M and then Fox FM.

== Members and Where Are They Now ==
The original members of the show were:

- Leaping Larry L, formerly writing for The Age newspaper, former co-host of now-defunct radio show All Over The Shop on 102.7 3RRR Thursdays at 2pm, writes on Leaping Larry L's crappy blog.
- Dennis Twilight (aka Dennis Tomaras).
- The Audio Assassin (aka David Armstrong) Currently reading the news on Melbourne radio's 3AW.
- Brett Duck (aka Brett McLeod) Currently reporting/reading the news on Melbourne television's Nine Network.

== The Arriba! Sessions (Album) ==
This album featured sketches which originated on the show from 1985 to 1989, completely re-recorded and issued in 1989, on cassette only. It included a number of ad parodies, the mock Beatles historical documentary "Do-It-Yourself Beatles", the fabricated movie trailer "Kung Fu Rabbi", and a travesty on English soccer commentary entitled "Big Genital Soccer".

== Appetite For Arriba! (Album) ==
An album of sketches originating on the show from 1988 to 1990, re-recorded and released in 1990, on vinyl LP and cassette.
