= Gruen (TV series) =

Australian television program

- Also known as: The Gruen Transfer; Gruen Nation; Gruen Planet; Gruen Sweat
- Created by: Andrew Denton; Jon Casimir
- Directed by: Mark Fitzgerald
- Presented by: Wil Anderson
- Starring: Russel Howcroft; Todd Sampson
- Composer: David Chapman
- Country of origin: Australia
- Original language: English
- No. of series: 18
- No. of episodes: 201 (list of episodes)

Production
- Executive producers: Andrew Denton; Anita Jacoby; Debbie Cuell; Polly Connolly; Richard Huddleston; Sophia Zachariou; Wil Anderson; Nick Murray; Nick Hayden
- Producers: Jon Casimir; Amelia Barry; Sophie Braham; Sarah Douglas
- Camera setup: Multi-camera
- Running time: 35 minutes
- Production company: CJZ

Original release
- Network: ABC
- Release: 28 May 2008 – present

Gruen (previously known as The Gruen Transfer) is an Australian television program focusing on advertising, which debuted on the ABC on 28 May 2008. The program is hosted by Wil Anderson and produced by Andrew Denton's production company, Zapruder's Other Films, now part of CJZ. Anderson is accompanied by a panel of advertising industry experts including Russel Howcroft (originally of George Patterson Y&R) and Todd Sampson (previously of Leo Burnett). The title refers to the Gruen transfer, the response to designed disorientation cues in retail environments.

The show's debut episode drew an audience of nearly 1.3 million, the highest debut for an entertainment program in the ABC's history. The concept has been sold to TV production companies in the UK, Denmark, France, Italy, Portugal, South Africa and Spain. The Gruen Transfer was nominated for an AFI award for Best Light Entertainment Television Series in 2008.

A spinoff series, Gruen Nation, aired during the 2010 Australian federal election and again for the 2013 Australian federal election. A second spinoff series, Gruen Planet, took over from the fourth series of The Gruen Transfer on 28 September 2011, focusing on corporate and government global media strategies and public relations. Another spinoff series entitled Gruen Sweat examining the branding and marketing of the 2012 London Olympics began airing from 25 July 2012. The spinoff series titled Gruen began airing on 9 September 2015, following the original concept of The Gruen Transfer series.

== Format ==
Early series' segments included:

- How Do You Sell?: This segment every week looks at advertising tactics used by advertisers to choose one product over another. Topics covered include beer, underwear, chocolate and banks.
- Endorse Me: Wil Anderson gives the panel the challenge of finding a sponsor for people who are famous for all the wrong reasons. Examples include Carl Williams and David Hicks.
- The Pitch: Two advertising companies are given a brief to create an advertisement for an "unsellable" product. Previous examples have included whale meat, tourism in Baghdad, the beleaguered Australian Democrats political party, and a proposed invasion of New Zealand, which provoked a response from the New Zealand government and several NZ YouTube viewers, although the final episode of Series One provided some balance in the form of a promotion for tourists not to visit Australia. A controversial anti-discrimination ad by Sydney agency The Foundry to promote "fat pride", which depicted people telling racist and homophobic jokes, resulted in the ABC pulling the segment from the 13 May 2009 episode, deeming that it would breach the ABC's editorial guidelines.
- Ad of the Week: This is where Wil and the panel look at an ad and they discuss it and how effective it is.
- What is this Ad for?: Wil shows the beginning of an ad without identifying the product, then asks the panel to guess what it is for.
- What's Wrong With This Ad?: A semi-regular segment where Wil shows an ad, usually submitted by a viewer, then asks the panel what they believe to be wrong about that ad. For example, the Philadelphia Cream Cheese Heaven campaign emphasises low fat in its product, so a viewer commented that, in the ad, even after dying and going to heaven, you still have to worry about your weight.
- Space Invaders: A semi-regular segment in which a real-life example of a new or unusual space for advertising is discussed. Examples include sheep jackets, children's books and on slums. The panel are then challenged to figure out a worthwhile client for advertisements in that space.
- God I Hate That Ad!: A web exclusive segment introduced in series two where Wil will bring up a particular ad that he, or viewers, dislike and has the panel discuss it, whether it is bad or not, or why it is bad. In the end the panel decide whether it is a bad ad or not.
- What Does it Mean?: A web exclusive segment introduced in series two where Wil and the panel come to a consensus of what message an ad is trying to get across when it is not obvious.
- The Worst Ad of All Time (Gruen Polished Turd), The Worst Product of All Time (Golden Steak Knives), Personal Worst (Brown Logie): A segment where the panel judges an ad or product based on how horrible it is with the "winner" being announced at the end of the series (this excludes the worst product of all time as the winner for it wasn't announced). The "prizes" are satirical allusions to a vulgar colloquialism for the advertising and public relations industries: "turd polishing".

=== Gruen Nation ===
A spin-off series called Gruen Nation was aired during the 2010 federal election campaign. The first episode aired on 28 July 2010 at 9 pm. The series concluded on 18 August 2010. Each 45-minute episode was hosted by Wil Anderson with regular Gruen Transfer guests Todd Sampson and Russel Howcroft and guests John Hewson, leader of the federal Liberal party 1990–94, Neil Lawrence, "Kevin 07" campaign co-ordinator, and Annabel Crabb, journalist and political commentator. Anderson said "If the ABC is the national broadcaster, then Gruen Nation is the national bullshit detector."

=== Gruen Planet ===
A spin-off called Gruen Planet was announced to replace series 4 of The Gruen Transfer, with a broader landspace. The first episode of the first series premiered on 28 September 2011 with 1.138 million viewers, rating fourth viewed show of the week. The second series began airing on 22 August 2012 following the conclusion of Gruen Sweat.

Segments included:

- The Image Renovators: This segment every week looked at advertising and public relations tactics used.
- The Pitch: Two advertising companies were given a brief to create an advertisement for an "unsellable" product.
- What Would Putin/Palmer/Kim Jong-un/Justin Do?: This showed the attempts of various public figures to promote themselves.
- Spin Cycle: This showed attempts to score a headline.
- How Do You Sell?: This segment every week looked at advertising tactics used by advertisers to choose one product over another. Topics covered include beer, underwear, chocolate and banks.

=== Gruen Sweat ===
A third spin-off series, titled Gruen Sweat, aired throughout the 2012 Summer Olympics. The four-episode series premiered on 25 July 2012 to 931,000 viewers.

=== Gruen ===
A spin-off called Gruen was announced to replace Gruen Planet. The first episode of the first series premiered on 9 September 2015 with 974,000 viewers, ranking as the fourth-most-viewed show of the week. Despite the revised name, there are only extremely minor changes implemented for Gruen. All episodes are hosted by Wil Anderson and feature Todd Sampson and Russel Howcroft.

== Panelists ==
Panelists have included: Karen Ferry, Christina Aventi, Dee Madigan, Emily Taylor, Pia Chaudhuri, Carolyn Miller, Adam Ferrier, Sunita Gloster, Lauren Zonfrillo, Priya Patel, Annie O'Rourke, Camey O'Keefe, Kirsty Muddle and others.

== Episodes ==
| Series | Title | Episodes | | Originally released | |
| Series | Title | Episodes | | First released | Last released |
|---|---|---|---|---|---|
| 1 | The Gruen Transfer | 10 | | 28 May 2008 | 30 July 2008 |
| 2 | The Gruen Transfer | 10 | | 18 March 2009 | 20 May 2009 |
| 3 | The Gruen Transfer | 16 | 6 | 16 June 2010 | 21 July 2010 |
| 3 | Gruen Nation | 16 | 4 | 28 July 2010 | 18 August 2010 |
| 3 | The Gruen Transfer | 16 | 6 | 25 August 2010 | 29 September 2010 |
| 4 | The Gruen Transfer | 16 | 8 | 3 August 2011 | 21 September 2011 |
| 4 | Gruen Planet | 16 | 8 | 28 September 2011 | 16 November 2011 |
| 5 | Gruen Sweat | 14 | 4 | 25 July 2012 | 15 August 2012 |
| 5 | Gruen Planet | 14 | 10 | 22 August 2012 | 24 October 2012 |
| 6 | Gruen Nation | 12 | 4 | 14 August 2013 | 4 September 2013 |
| 6 | Gruen Planet | 12 | 8 | 11 September 2013 | 30 October 2013 |
| 7 | Gruen | 10 | | 9 September 2015 | 11 November 2015 |
| 8 | Gruen | 10 | | 3 August 2016 | 5 October 2016 |
| 9 | Gruen | 10 | | 13 September 2017 | 16 October 2017 |
| 10 | Gruen | 10 | | 2 May 2018 | 4 July 2018 |
| 11 | Gruen | 10 | | 25 September 2019 | 27 November 2019 |
| 12 | Gruen | 10 | | 14 October 2020 | 16 December 2020 |
| 13 | Gruen | 10 | | 13 October 2021 | 15 December 2021 |
| 14 | Gruen Nation | 10 | 2 | 11 May 2022 | 18 May 2022 |
| 14 | Gruen | 10 | 8 | 7 June 2022 | 27 July 2022 |
| 15 | Gruen | 9 | | 21 June 2023 | 16 August 2023 |
| 16 | Gruen | 10 | | 15 May 2024 | 18 July 2024 |
| 17 | Gruen Nation | 12 | 2 | 30 April 2025 | 7 May 2025 |
| 17 | Gruen | 12 | 10 | 14 May 2025 | 16 July 2025 |
| 18 | Gruen | 12 | | 29 April 2026 | 15 July 2026 |

== Critical reception ==
In 2009, The Sydney Morning Herald felt that The Gruen Transfer represented "intelligence and substance."

In 2013, The Sydney Morning Herald thought that by Gruen Planet, the show's creators had got the franchise format "down to a fine art".

=== Awards ===
| Year | Award | Category | Result | Ref. |
|---|---|---|---|---|
| 2013 | Rose d'Or | Best Entertainment Program | Won | |
| 2025 | TV Week Logie Awards | Best Comedy Entertainment Program | Nominated | |

=== Ratings ===
Gruen returned to television in 2016 with 954,000 viewers, and in 2017 with 903,000 viewers, while in 2020 it received 943,000 viewers.

Gruen : AUS viewers per episode (millions)

| Season | Episode number | | | | | | | | | | | | | | | |
| Season | 1 | 2 | 3 | 4 | 5 | 6 | 7 | 8 | 9 | 10 | 11 | 12 | 13 | 14 | 15 | 16 |
|---|---|---|---|---|---|---|---|---|---|---|---|---|---|---|---|---|
| 1 | 1.287 | 1.273 | 1.121 | 1.204 | 1.182 | 1.058 | 1.302 | 1.314 | 1.386 | 1.456 | – | | | | | |
| 2 | 1.120 | 1.151 | 0.976 | 1.087 | 1.212 | 1.244 | 1.226 | 1.211 | 1.239 | 1.312 | – | | | | | |
| 3 | 1.177 | 1.227 | 1.407 | 1.197 | 1.341 | 1.280 | 1.600 | 1.503 | 1.571 | 1.540 | 1.358 | 1.391 | 1.482 | 1.407 | 1.448 | 1.403 |
| 4 | 1.072 | 1.114 | 1.120 | 1.017 | 1.165 | 1.164 | 1.269 | 1.162 | 1.138 | 1.130 | 1.023 | 1.110 | 1.160 | 1.050 | 1.180 | 1.170 |
| 5 | 0.931 | 0.793 | 0.794 | 0.918 | 0.906 | 0.810 | 0.917 | 0.939 | 0.946 | 0.913 | 1.023 | 0.997 | 1.018 | 1.038 | – | |
| 6 | 1.028 | 1.052 | 1.045 | 1.179 | 1.128 | 0.988 | 0.908 | 0.784 | 0.884 | 0.909 | 1.070 | 1.004 | – | | | |
| 7 | 0.974 | 0.915 | 0.900 | 0.917 | 0.926 | 0.902 | 0.904 | 0.904 | 0.897 | 0.948 | – | | | | | |
| 8 | 0.954 | 0.865 | 0.829 | 0.927 | 0.901 | 0.830 | 0.815 | 0.832 | 0.796 | 0.832 | – | | | | | |
| 9 | 0.903 | 0.773 | 0.793 | 0.806 | 0.838 | 0.813 | 0.849 | 0.816 | 0.840 | 0.718 | – | | | | | |
| 10 | 0.862 | 0.841 | 0.897 | 0.784 | 0.825 | 0.764 | 0.877 | 0.881 | 0.809 | 0.785 | – | | | | | |
| 11 | 0.855 | 0.874 | 0.825 | 0.827 | 0.730 | 0.695 | 0.744 | 0.741 | 0.732 | 0.749 | – | | | | | |
| 12 | 1.037 | 0.831 | 0.891 | 0.746 | 0.732 | 0.666 | 0.732 | 0.725 | 0.698 | 0.638 | – | | | | | |
| 13 | 0.657 | 0.702 | 0.647 | 0.602 | 0.577 | 0.618 | 0.539 | 0.573 | 0.468 | 0.526 | – | | | | | |
| 14 | 0.588 | 0.559 | 0.491 | 0.619 | 0.501 | 0.524 | 0.536 | 0.416 | 0.519 | 0.510 | – | | | | | |
| 15 | 0.436 | 0.532 | 0.484 | 0.415 | 0.427 | 0.458 | 0.480 | 0.514 | 0.215 | – | | | | | | |
| 16 | 0.751 | 0.702 | 0.667 | 0.603 | 0.725 | 0.795 | 0.562 | 0.727 | 0.717 | 0.566 | – | | | | | |
| 17 | 0.809 | 0.800 | – | | | | | | | | | | | | | |

Source: Audience measurement performed by OzTam

=== Legacy ===
The show's panelists have become minor celebrities and experts in their fields. They have been contacted to speak on a variety of marketing-related issues, and in particular Todd Sampson was hired by Qantas for a marketing campaign.
