= Peter Ford (entertainment reporter) =

Australian entertainment reporter

- Occupation: Entertainment reporter
- Television: The Morning Show, Sunrise, A Current Affair, Studio 10, The Bert Newton Show, Midday

Peter Ford is an Australian entertainment reporter.

He is known for his many regular live appearances on radio stations and television programs in Australia and New Zealand.

== Early career ==
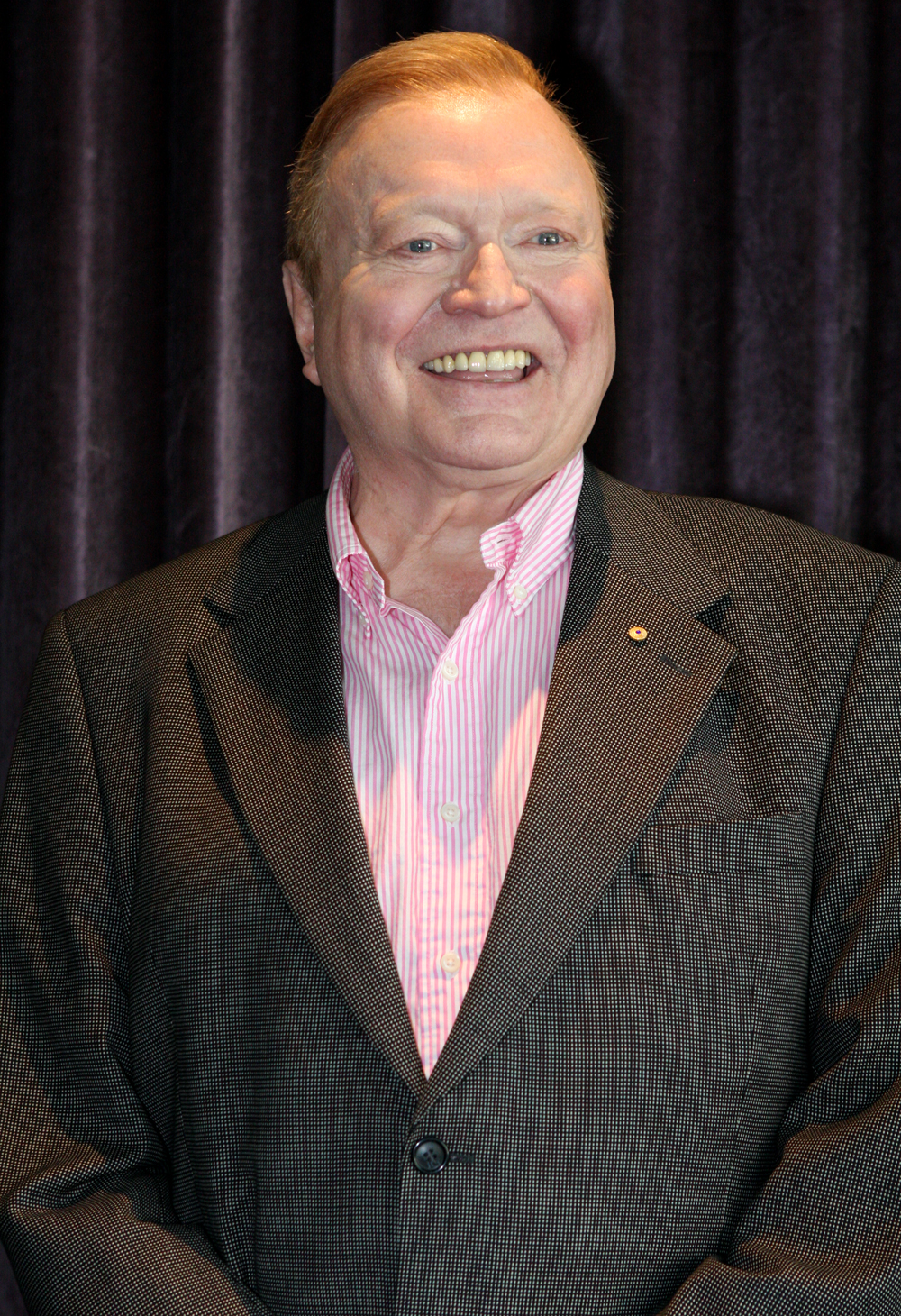
Bert Newton, whose radio show Ford produced in the early 1980s

Ford formed an interest in the local entertainment industry while living in the Melbourne suburb of Yarraville in his youth. He has recalled waiting outside a local newsagency for the latest issues of entertainment magazines and would attend the opening of shopping centres to see celebrities. Ford has also recalled waiting outside the 3AW studio to see Mary Hardy.

Ford attempted to pursue a career in journalism but he was unsuccessful in applying for a course at the Royal Melbourne Institute of Technology. While working as a cleaner in Footscray, Ford attempted to obtain work in the media. He attempted to obtain cadetships with newspapers including The Herald and The Age and also approached radio stations in the hope of working in their newsrooms.

His attempts were in vain until one of his former teachers contacted his parents to tell them radio station 3UZ were advertising for an office boy. Ford got the job and commenced working at 3UZ with one of his duties being to collect the mail bags, bringing them back to the studio in Bourke Street on a tram, and sorting the mail before 9:30am each morning.

Ford remembers the 3UZ studio as "an amazing place" with "a great sense of history" despite being "a shocking old moth-eatan rat-infested joint".

Ford has recalled a lot of the older employees at 3UZ when he commenced working were those who had been in the industry since the 1940s and 1950s, with Bob Rogers working as the breakfast presenter before Don Lane joined the station.

Ford's first on air job was as an 'around the grounds' football reporter. He was then appointed as a producer on Bert Newton's morning radio show, initially on a temporary basis before he was assigned to the role permanently, after which Ford spent approximately eight years working as a radio and television producer.

After producing radio in Melbourne, Ford worked in New Zealand for two years before returning to Australia. At the age of 22 and with no television experience, Ford began a two-year stint working as a producer on the Network Ten breakfast show, Good Morning Australia, which was hosted by Kerri-Anne Kennerly and Gordon Elliot.

From 1989 to 1990, Ford hosted a radio program called Alive and Dangerous on 3AK, where he interviewed personalities such as Ernest Borgnine, David Essex, Bill Kerr, Bud Tingwell and Denise Drysdale.

== Entertainment reporting and controversies ==
After Bert Newton encouraged him to pursue on air opportunities, Ford sent airchecks on audio cassettes to various Australian radio stations pitching the idea of him becoming their entertainment reporter. While many stations rejected Ford's proposal, 7LA in Launceston agreed to the idea, becoming the first station to have him deliver entertainment news. 3BA in Ballarat soon followed suit with 3AW in Melbourne becoming the first capital city station to have Ford deliver entertainment news for their listeners.

Ford's first appearance on television was on the Nine Network's lunchtime variety show Midday which Newton was guest hosting for a week in 1988. In 1989, Ford became a regular guest on The Bert Newton Show, a lunchtime variety show launched on the Seven Network in an attempt to rival Nine's Midday but was axed after just one year.

After gradually growing his profile as an entertainment reporter, Ford is now utilised by many metropolitan and regional radio stations throughout Australia and New Zealand each day where he regularly "breaks" many stories relating to the media industry.

On television, Ford has a regular spot on The Morning Show and has provided commentary to programs such as Sunrise, A Current Affair, Studio 10 and 20 to 1.

=== Controversies ===
==== 2000s ====
Ford was fired from Ernie Sigley's 3AW program in February 2001 following a disagreement with Sigley about covering Nicole Kidman and Tom Cruise's separation. Sigley's producer informed Ford that Sigley had imposed a ban on discussing the issue. After Ford refused to go on air and not discuss the story, Sigley refused to have Ford back on his program. Despite this, Ford was back on 3AW several months later after Ross Stevenson invited him to be a part of his show.

In July 2007, Ford quit his regular segment on Mike Carlton's program on 2UE in Sydney after Carlton criticised the recently deceased Stan Zemanek while on air with Ford on 17 July 2007 - the day of Zemanek's funeral. Ford denies that he was sacked by Carlton as was reported. Ford said he had informed 2UE management that he would refuse to appear on Carlton's program following the incident. Ford said Carlton put him in an "insidious position" and described Carlton attacking Zemanek, whom Ford described as a mentor, on the day of his funeral as "evil".

In September 2009, Ford became one of many entertainment reporters internationally to fall victim to a hoax involving the supposed death of actress Jaclyn Smith. Ford told 3AW listeners Smith was in a critical condition in a Honduras hospital following a suicide attempt involving a gun. The story about Smith's supposed death had also been reported elsewhere prior to Ford's segment. When it was deemed the story wasn't genuiune, Ford returned to the air several minutes later to admit that it was wrong and apologised. A tweet was published on Jaclyn Smith's official Twitter account stating that she was at safe and at home with her family and not in Honduras before describing the story as a "lie".

==== 2010s ====
In September 2014, Ford was criticised on ABC TV's Media Watch for inaccurately reporting that Ian Thorpe and Ricky Martin were in a relationship and had agreed to a magazine deal with $500,000. Ford had told 3BA in Ballarat that a magazine interview was about to be published about their relationship, before following it up with a tweet, prompted other media outlets in Australia and overseas to republish the claim. However, that afternoon the story was being reported as untrue with Martin's management claiming that Martin and Thorpe had never met. Ford admitted he had sourced the information from an anonymous tip to 6PR in Perth from someone using the pseudonym Sir Rumour, who had previously tipped the station off about Thorpe's "coming out" interview with Michael Parkinson. When Media Watch challenged Ford about the inaccuracy of the report, Ford continued to claim that there was still a possibility it could be true. Two months later, Thorpe admitted that he was friends with Martin but they were not in a relationship.

In March 2015, Ford questioned Chrissie Swan's participation on the first season of I'm a Celebrity... Get Me Out of Here! stating "Not sure what it says about society that we reward a mother who leaves a 1 year old baby to chase fame". Ford's comments were met with considerable criticism.

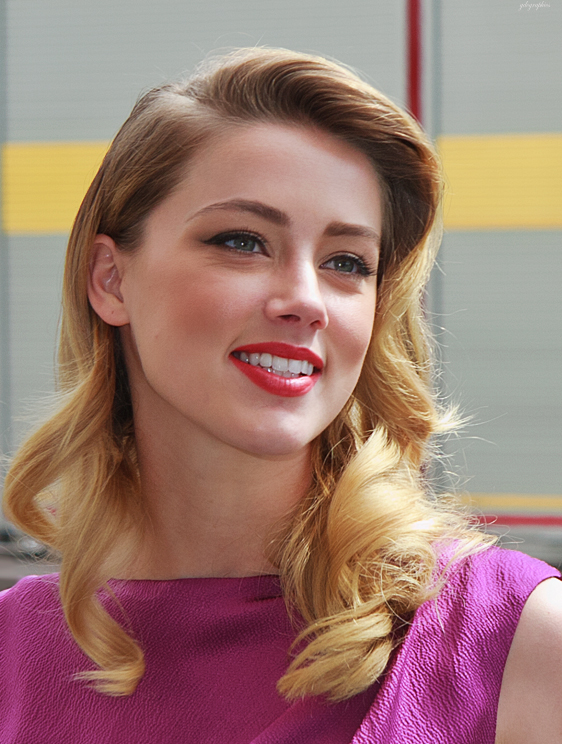
Ford was accused of "blatant biphobia" by a newspaper columnist in 2016 after comments he made on The Morning Show about Amber Heard

In May 2016, Ford was criticised in The Sydney Morning Herald by commentator Jenny Noyes who accused Ford of "blatant biphobia" after he made comments on The Morning Show when he said it "was not wise to marry a bisexual". Ford appeared to take issue with Amber Heard's sexuality after she made allegations of domestic violence against Johnny Depp. Ford added: "This is what Johnny Depp has done here, with Amber Heard, and she was in a very legally committed relationship, a marriage, a legal marriage, to another woman when Johnny came along, and she decided to travel across to the other side." Responding to Noyes article, Ford said he although he rejects the suggestion that he was endorsing domestic violence, he had educated himself by doing research which included speaking to psychologist Dr Michael Carr-Gregg. Ford said it had been explained to him that "just because a person is bisexual... if they commit into a relationship, the evidence is there that there's no more or less chance that it's going to fail just because one person in the relationship is bisexual."

In August 2016, Ford was criticised after sending Meshel Laurie a postcard after she blocked him on Twitter after he questioned her complaints about Sonia Kruger's controversial comments about halting Muslim migration to Australia. Ford asked her: "Have you told her how you feel or do you just play it out on Twitter". After she received Ford's postcard, Laurie tweeted a photo and said she had been "warned" because Ford is "so desperate for (the) final word" and described the act as "sad". On the postcard, Ford said he was disappointed about the way Laurie treated him on Twitter and that she "shouldn't be so nasty and block people" as they were fellow professionals. Ford said it was "most disappointing" as he had always held her in "high regard". Responding to Laurie's comments, Ford said he regularly sends postcards and that he had dropped her the note out of courtesy as he doesn't like "bad blood". But he said he had no intention of wasting money on another stamp with another postcard for Laurie after her comments. Community advocate Lydia Shelly also revealed she had received a postcard from Peter Ford after she also blocked him on Twitter. Shelly described the act as "Creepy. Entitled. Weird. Not ok.’" Ford said he was somewhat perplexed by the negative reaction and said he considered it amazing that someone writing to another person in a professional manner at their work address was considered newsworthy.

==== 2020s ====
In February 2020, Ford apologised to former Hey Hey It's Saturday host Daryl Somers. Ford had claimed during the 6PR breakfast program with Basil Zempilas that Somers had been fired from hosting a 2019 Carols by Candlelight event in Ballarat reportedly due to outrageous demands. Ford had claimed Somers had run up an expensive bar tab, demanded a furnished marquee to serve as a dressing room and insisted of an appearance by Plucka Duck.

The legal action was settled after both Ford and Zempilas apologised for the comments about Somers which were made on 6PR. In an interview after the legal action was settled, Somers said he felt vindicated after receiving the apologies for the "false comments" made by Ford and Zempilas, stating: "There were a lot of false allegations made against me and I thought, not this time I need to get to the bottom of this. It came down to a full and unreserved apology been issued to me from Peter Ford and Basil Zempilas." Somers said he had been "incredibly disappointed" by the comments which led to him defending his integrity. After issuing the apology, Ford said the two months of legal discussions had been challenging and told Somers through the Herald Sun "...stop coming after me and causing havoc in my life and great distress to my family. You got everything you wanted from me and now you’re giving interviews about it. Just piss off."

Somers and Ford had previously been embroiled in a controversy in 2009 when Somers had called Ford a "two faced prick". Somers took issue with Ford's comments claiming that it was unlikely a Hey Hey It's Saturday reunion show would eventuate due to animosity amongst the cast but then praised Hey Hey during an appearance on A Current Affair. Ford described Somers comments as "a very personal attack".

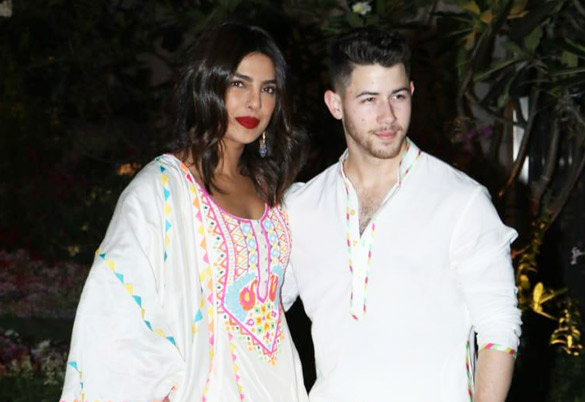
In 2021, Ford questioned why Priyanka Chopra and Nick Jonas were announcing the Oscar nominations, prompting a response from Chopra

In March 2021, Ford questioned why Priyanka Chopra and Nick Jonas were announcing the nominations for the 93rd Academy Awards, writing on Twitter: "No disrespect to these two but I’m not sure their contribution to the movies qualifies them to be announcing Oscar nominees." Chopra took offense to Ford's comments and responded by sharing a video detailing her filmography, providing a link to her IMDb page and writing: "Would love your thoughts on what qualifies someone. Here are my 60+ film credentials for your adept consideration @mrpford". Referring to Ford's comments in a 2022 Vanity Fair interview, she said: "I usually don’t get mad, but that just pissed me off".

Also in March 2021, Ford's regular segments were dropped from Adelaide radio station FIVEaa. This decision came about after an on air conversation between himself and Jeremy Cordeaux in which Cordeaux described Brittany Higgins, who alleges she was raped at Parliament House, as a "silly little girl who got drunk". Cordeaux had his contract terminated by FIVEaa's owner Nova Entertainment following his controversial comments. Ford said in a statement that he didn't subscribe to Cordeaux's comments and he had disagreed with them on air by describing Higgins as "admirable" but it wasn't his place to demand a radio host agree with his own opinions. Ford also claimed requests to hear the final edit of pre-recorded conversation between himself and Cordeaux which went to air were denied by station management. Ford also claimed because Cordeaux has no social media, he was the one receiving all the abuse arising from the controversy. Ford said: “I called Brittany ‘admirable’ during our chat, but because I didn't challenge Cordeaux and because he has no social media I was copping all his haters... I got about 200 tweets from people telling me I'm scum. All I wanted to know is what actually made it to air and what was edited so I can defend myself.”

In 2022, Ford accused Peter FitzSimons of being a bully after FitzSimons appeared to mock the absence in the media of Alan Jones. Ford said Jones was recovering from having multiple surgeries and accused Fitzsimmons of being "a bully in exactly the same way he accuses Alan of being". He also said that FitzSimons was a "failure on breakast radio" which "eats away at him like a cancer". Ford has also been critical of FitzSimons' wife Lisa Wilkinson. Ford raised doubts about claims Wilkinson made in her autobiography in 2021 regarding her final day co-hosting Today with Karl Stefanovic and later criticised the way she left The Project in 2022.

In October 2024, Ford twice referred to Victorian independent Senator Lidia Thorpe as a skank in since-deleted posts on X, following her heckle of King Charles III during his visit to Australia, doubling down on the comment after being called out as misogynistic.

== Personal life ==
Despite his frequent appearances on radio and television, Ford rarely gives interviews about himself. He gave two rare interviews in 2017 - one to industry website radioinfo and one to the Remember When? radio program on 3AW.

In 2014, Ford was one of 12 commentators to be asked by TV Tonight to list five people within the Australian media industry whom they personally considered to be living treasures. Ford's list consisted of Bert Newton, Mike Walsh, Mickie de Stoop, Anne Wills and Peter Faiman.

Ford and Bert Newton maintained a friendship until Newton's death in 2021, after which Ford divulged a story that he promised Newton he wouldn't report until Newton had died. After Newton's death, Ford revealed that Newton had donated one of his Gold Logies to one of Ford's friends who was a terminally-ill AIDS patient at the Fairfield Infectious Diseases Hospital in 1990. This occurred after Ford sent get well cards to various celebrities asking them to autograph them before forwarding them onto the hospital. Newton instead personally visited Ford's friend in the hospital where he also visited all the other patients and spent time with them, before gifting one of his Gold Logie statues to Ford's friend. Fearing that he had broken a rule pertaining to the donation of Logie statues, Newton asked Ford not to report on it until after he had "carked it".

After the death of Shane Warne in 2022, Ford revealed that he had an enduring friendship with Warne where the two had sent thousands of text messages to each other despite never having personally met.
