= Talk (Paul Kelly album) =

Studio album by Paul Kelly and the Dots
- Released: 30 March 1981
- Studios: Balance Sound, Armstrong's, EMI Studios 301
- Genre: Australian rock
- Length: 37:47
- Label: Mushroom
- Producers: Joe Camilleri, Martin Armiger, Trevor Lucas

Paul Kelly and the Dots chronology
Talk (1981)	Manila (1982)

Singles from Talk
- 1. "Recognition" Released: 1979; 2. "Billy Baxter" Released: 20 October 1980; 3. "Lowdown" Released: 3 May 1981

Talk is the debut album by Australian rock group Paul Kelly and the Dots and was originally released on 30 March 1981 by Mushroom Records and re-released in 1990. Jo Jo Zep & The Falcons leader Joe Camilleri produced seven of the eleven tracks with three tracks produced by Martin Armiger (The Sports) and one by Trevor Lucas (ex-Fairport Convention, Fotheringay). The album spawned the singles, "Recognition", "Billy Baxter" and "Lowdown". Only "Billy Baxter" appeared on the Kent Music Report Singles Chart it peaked at No. 38. The album peaked at No. 44 on the related Albums Chart. All tracks were written by Kelly, including two co-written with guitarist Chris Langman.

== Background ==
"Billy Baxter"
Paul Kelly and the Dots' first charting single, "Billy Baxter", was released on 20 October 1980. Ahead of their debut album, Talk.

Paul Kelly and the Dots had formed in August 1978 in Melbourne from the remains of High Rise Bombers, which included Martin Armiger. Their debut single "Recognition" was issued in 1979, under the name The Dots, on an independent label, but had no chart success. "Recognition" line-up were Kelly (vocals), Chris Langman (guitars), Chris Worrall (guitars), Paul Gadsby (bass guitar) and John Lloyd (drums). The version of "Recognition" included on Talk is not the single version, but a re-recording.

The Dots were signed to Mushroom Records, and underwent further line-up changes prior to the album's release. The band name was changed to "Paul Kelly and the Dots" at the record company's insistence.

Armiger produced part of the album, while Joe Camilleri produced the majority of the LP. The group released "Billy Baxter" in 1980, which peaked at No. 38 on the Australian Kent Music Report Singles Chart. The song's subject, Billy Baxter, is an Australian musician and comedian. "Hard Knocks", the sole track produced by Trevor Lucas, is the title track of the feature film, Hard Knocks (June 1980), for which Lucas paid post-production costs. It appeared on the film soundtrack by various artists in September 1980. Due to a back injury, Kelly had recorded his vocal track for that song while laying on the studio floor.

Talk was issued on 30 March 1981 and peaked at No. 44 on the related albums chart. "Lowdown" was released as a single in May but had no chart success. The group then travelled to the Philippines' capital to record their second album Manila during July and August 1981, but further line-up changes delayed its release until August 1982. Kelly was later dissatisfied with both of these albums: "I wish I could grab the other two and put 'em in a big hole". They were briefly reissued on CD in 1991 but have been out of print ever since.

The album's liner notes quote the opening stanzas of Charles Baudelaire's 1857 poem, "Les Foules" (see "The Crowds" for English translation).

== Reception ==
Professional ratings
Review scores
Source	Rating
AllMusic	2/5 stars

Reviewed at the time of release, Roadrunner said, "In songs like "Recognition" and "Cherry", Kelly's voice takes on irresistible quality. No-one in Australia presents songs in this manner. Few seem to appreciate subtlety like this." However, the song "Billy Baxter" was deemed "unlistenable."

== Track listing ==
Side one
No.	Title	Writer(s)	Producer(s)	Length
1.	"Promise Not to Tell"	Paul Kelly	Martin Armiger (Remix: Paul Kelly/Barry Earl)	3:24
2.	"Lowdown"	Kelly	Armiger (Remix: Kelly/Earl)	3:36
3.	"Want You Back"	Kelly	Armiger (Remix: Kelly/Earl)	3:12
4.	"Fall Guy"	Kelly, Chris Langman	Joe Camilleri (Remix: Kelly/Earl)	3:39
5.	"Hard Knocks"	Kelly	Trevor Lucas (Remix: Joe Camilleri/Jim Barton)	3:57

Side two
No.	Title	Writer(s)	Producer(s)	Length
6.	"Billy Baxter"	Kelly, Langman	Camilleri (Remix: Kelly/Earl)	2:47
7.	"Recognition"	Kelly	Camilleri (Remix: Kelly/Earl)	3:08
8.	"Cherry"	Kelly	Camilleri	4:35
9.	"The Way Love Used to Be"	Kelly	Camilleri	3:11
10.	"I Hate to Watch You Loving Him"	Kelly	Camilleri (Remix: Kelly/Earl)	3:22
11.	"Please Send Me"	Chris Dyson	Camilleri	2:53

== Personnel ==
Paul Kelly and the Dots

- Paul Kelly – vocals
- Chris Dyson – guitar, vocals, lead vocals on "Please Send Me"
- Chris Worrall – guitars
- Paul Gadsby – bass guitar
- Alan Brooker – bass guitar
- Tony Thornton – drums

Recording details

- Producer – Martin Armiger (tracks 1, 2, 3), Joe Camilleri (tracks 4, 6, 7, 8, 9, 10, 11), Trevor Lucas (track 5)
  - Remixer – Kelly (tracks 1, 2, 3, 4, 7, 10), Barry Earl (tracks 1, 2, 3, 4, 7, 10), Camilleri (track 5), Jim Barton (track 5)
- Engineer – Jim Barton
  - Remix engineer – Michael Lesso (track 5)

== Charts ==
Chart (1981)	Peak position
Australia (Kent Music Report)	44

== Release history ==
Format	Country	Label	Catalogue No.	Year
LP	AUS	Mushroom	L37512	1981
LP	AUS	Mushroom	L19465	1990
CD	AUS	Mushroom	D19465	1990
