= Rumour File =

The Rumour File is a morning radio segment on 3AW in Melbourne, Australia which began in 1993 . Listeners are encouraged to call in with rumours they have heard. The segment also runs promotions and games.

Rumour File is reported to be one of Melbourne's most popular radio segments. The segment airs weekdays at 7:07 am.

The segment has a daily winner and a weekly winner. These winners - as well as wildcard entries - go into the draw for the annual prize, which is chosen at random. The winner receives a brand new Lexus. On 16 January 2018 it was announced that the BMW Australian network would be supplying the winning prize.

On 17 December 2018 it was announced that Mercedes Berwick would sponsor the 2019 prize.

== Winners ==
- 2005 - Greg
- 2006 - KuzzNshazziie
- 2007 - Worldwide-Store (First eBay company to win)
- 2008 - David
- 2009 - ?
- 2010 - Mile High
- 2011 - ?
- 2012 - Robert
- 2013 - Punch up (Ali)
- 2014 - Christmas in July
- 2015 - No World Record
- 2016 - Home Run
- 2017 - Black Market Pads
- 2018 - Only The Brave
- 2019 - Watch This Space
- 2020 - Don't Kiss the Bride
- 2021 - Fly High
- 2022 - Internal Fixation
- 2023 - Never Too Old
- 2024 - Caught red-handed
- 2025 - Cannon Fodder
