= Billy Baxter (musician) =

Australian musician

- Born: 1958 or 1959 (age 67–68); Geelong, Victoria, Australia
- Presenting career
- Show: Coodabeens Footy Show
- Station: 774 ABC Melbourne
- Network: Australian Broadcasting Corporation
- Time slot: Saturdays 10:00 am – 12:00 pm
- Show: Coodabeen Champions
- Station: 774 ABC Melbourne
- Network: Australian Broadcasting Corporation
- Style: Current sports events, news
- Country: Australia
- Previous show: Sunday Night Live

Billy Baxter OAM (born 1958 or 1959) is an Australian radio presenter and musician from Geelong. He is a co-presenter of the Australian rules football program Coodabeen Champions on 774 ABC Melbourne, alongside Jeff Richardson, Ian Cover, Jeff "Torch" McGee, Simon Whelan, Andy Bellairs and Greg Champion. As a musician, Baxter was the lead vocalist of Ghetto Blasters, Big Fans of Jesus, the Hollow Men and has also worked as a solo artist. The Hollow Men issued two albums on Au Go Go Records, Broken Stuff (1988) and So Long (1990). Baxter's solo albums are Holler (1991) and Speedhump, Thump (1994).

== Biography ==
=== Musical career ===
Billy Baxter was born in 1958 or 1959 and grew up in Geelong, where his parents ran a local milk bar. He played football for the Geelong Under 19s as a rover. In October 1980, Australian rock band, Paul Kelly & the Dots had issued a single, "Billy Baxter" where Kelly sang that "I want to be like Billy Baxter and do imitations, Billy's got a thousand faces, he's a lover and a gambler too". He was a vocalist for Ghetto Blasters from 1982 to 1984 with Archie Cuthbertson, Kevin Fleming, Don Morrison and Nigel Sweeting. Baxter and Fleming then formed Big Fans of Jesus (1984–1985) with Allan Brooker, Ian Hill and Steve Watson. They released a Live album in April. Later in 1985 Baxter formed the folk pop group The Hollow Men with Mal Stanley on vocals, guitar and organ (ex-Burning Souls), Jon Von Goes on guitar, Danny Butler on bass guitar and Paul Johnstone on drums. The group issued two albums on Au Go Go Records, Broken Stuff (1988) and So Long (1990). In the 1991 comedy film, Spotswood, Baxter and The Hollow Men appear as a rock group, the Cicadas. However the group had disbanded before the film's release. Baxter released his debut solo album, Holler (1991) and followed with Speedhump, Thump (1994). In April 1998 Baxter covered "(They Long to Be) Close to You" for the tribute album, To Hal and Bacharach, by various Australian artists. In December 2010, The Hollow Men had reformed to perform Broken Stuff live on air.

=== Radio presenter ===
In 1981, Baxter started an alternate career in radio, initially as a DJ on Melbourne community radio station 3RRR. The Age's Jenny Brown felt the program displayed "[a] patchwork of rarely heard records and off-the-wall novelty tracks" and Baxter was described as "not terrificly tall but the frontman of a rock band in rehearsal". Baxter then worked for Australian Broadcasting Corporation (ABC's) 3LO on the Sunday Night Live show. After his stint on 3LO he became a long term member of Coodabeens Footy Show on Radio National via 774 ABC Melbourne. The show's name, Coodabeen Champions, was provided in 1981 by Baxter about six months after its first broadcast. The current sports events program is co-presented by Jeff Richardson, Ian Cover and Greg Champion. Baxter also selects music for the show. In 2003, the program's comedy team Coodabeen Champions released a 2× CD compilation album, A Coodabeens Collection. On 13 June 2022 he was awarded a Medal of the Order of Australia (OAM) for "service to the performing arts, and to radio".

== Discography ==
Releases by Big Fans of Jesus, The Hollow Men or solo.

=== Albums ===
Big Fans of Jesus

- Live – (April 1985)

The Hollow Men

- Broken Stuff – (Au Go Go Records, 1988)
- So Long – (Au Go Go Records, 1990)

Solo

- Holler – (Au Go Go Records, 1991)
- Speedhump, Thump – (Chip Chop/MDS, 1994)

Coodabeen Champions

- A Coodabeens Collection – (Australian Broadcasting Corporation, 2003)
- The Coodabeen Champions Present Sunday Nightingales – (Australian Broadcasting Corporation, 2007)

=== Extended plays ===
The Hollow Men

- Blue Trains and Gravel Lanes – (Rampant, 1986)
- This Is Cactus Land – (1988)
- Live and Otherwise – (1988)

=== Singles ===
The Hollow Men

- "Human Wreck" – (1990)
- "My Pal" – (1990)

Solo

- "It's Too Late to Turn Back Now" (1987)
- "To Love Somebody" (1988)
