= Frankie Mazzone =

Australian actress and radio presenter

- Born: 2007 or 2008 (age 18–19)
- Occupations: Actress, model, radio presenter

Frankie Mazzone (born 2007 or 2008) is an Australian actress, model, radio presenter and transgender woman. She began identifying as transgender while in Year 8 at high school. She has since spoken publicly in support of trans rights and helped co-design the Victorian Government's 2024 trans awareness campaign, "The Unsaid Says a Lot." She has appeared in advertising campaigns as a model. As an actress, she played the character of Jasmine Stewart in Neighbours and has appeared in music videos and short films.

Mazzone is currently the host of Young at Art on Melbourne community radio station 3RRR, airing between 4 and 6 am on Monday mornings. The show "platforms young artists and their talents, and tackles the ideas surrounding stereotypes about the music of younger generations."

== Filmography ==
- Hachiku - "Zombie Slayer" music video (2017)
- Neighbours (2024-25)
- Unfit (2025)
- Buzzer Beaten (2026)
