= Jacqueline Felgate =

Australian television presenter and radio host

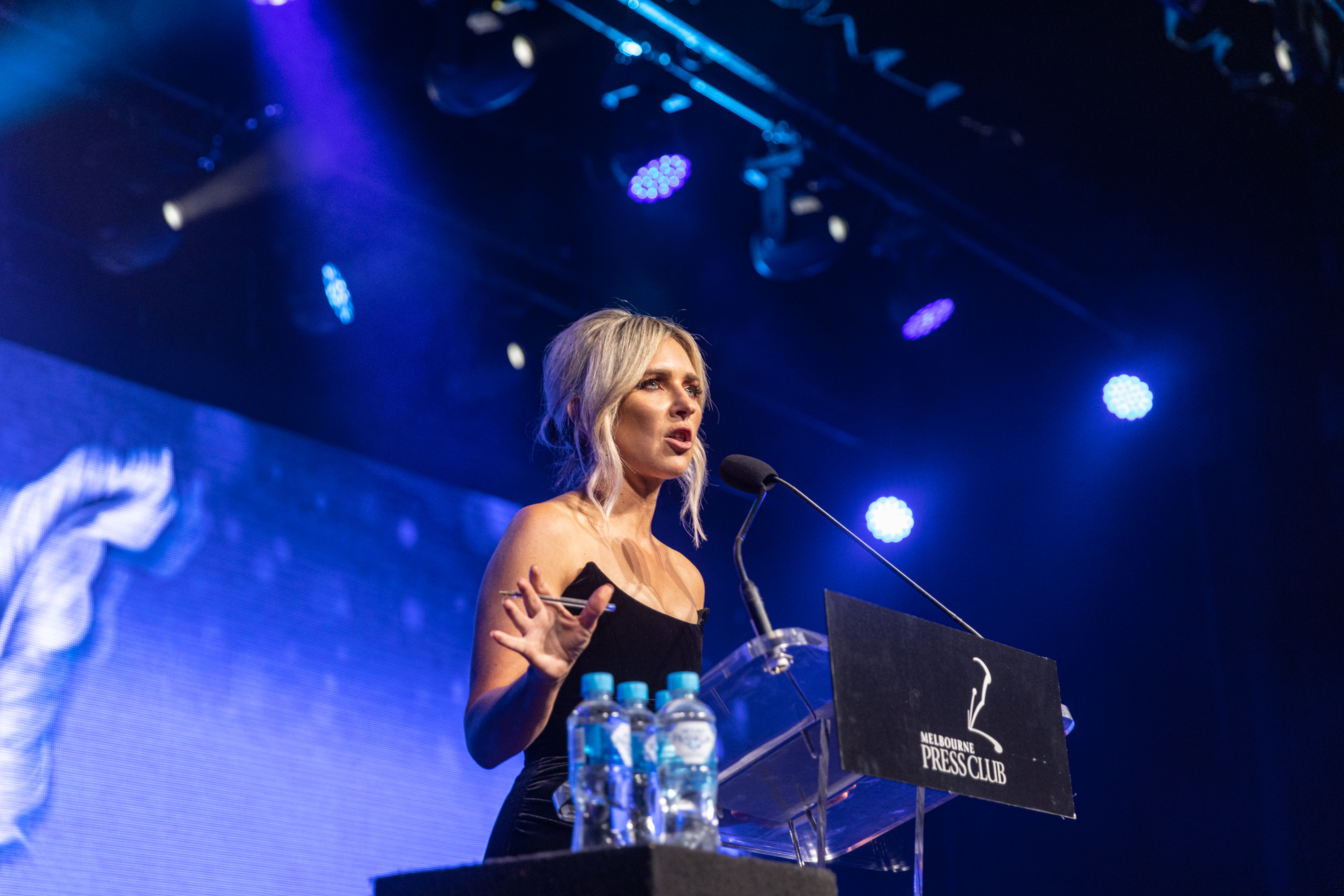
- Felgate hosts Melbourne Press Club Quill Awards, March 2022.
- Education: Melbourne University
- Occupation: Journalist
- Employer: 3AW

Jacqueline Felgate is an Australian television and radio presenter.

Felgate currently hosts the Drive program on 3AW.

== Career ==
Felgate began her journalism career in 2005 with a cadetship at the Herald Sun, later freelancing for Nine News Melbourne before joining Seven News Melbourne in 2012. At Seven, she served as a senior reporter and fill-in presenter, eventually becoming the afternoon news presenter and weekend sport presenter.

In 2022, Jacqui transitioned to radio, becoming the senior host of 3AW’s football coverage, and she regularly appeared as a fill-in host on 3AW Breakfast, Afternoons and Drive. She also hosted Friday Night Football and contributes weekly food reviews.

In September 2023, 3AW announced that Felgate would become the new host of its Drive program from January 2024.

Jacqui maintains a popular Instagram account, with over 496,000 followers, where she collaborates with various brands.

Felgate made history as the first woman to host the Brownlow Medal count and has covered major sporting events including the AFL Grand Final, Wimbledon, and the Beijing Olympic Games. Her work as an MC has seen her partner with leading Australian companies for high-profile events.

In June 2026, Tapt Media launched Fascinated with Jacqui Felgate, an interview‑driven podcast in which Felgate explores the rabbit holes, childhood fixations and unexpected obsessions that have shaped extraordinary lives, presented with a deliberately non‑political focus.

== Personal life ==
Born in Melbourne, Felgate attended Tintern Grammar and later earned a Bachelor of Arts in Political Science from the University of Melbourne. Her early interest in political journalism shaped her initial career path, though she later embraced sports and general news reporting.

Felgate is married to sport journalist Michael Felgate and has two children.

In September 2022, it was announced that she would become the senior host of radio station 3AW’s football coverage. Before that she worked for nearly 10 years as a news presenter and reporter for Seven News in Melbourne.

In May 2023, Felgate was hospitalised following a horse-riding accident. Later that year, she faced scrutiny over undisclosed commercial sponsorships linked to her social media presence, prompting updates to 3AW’s public disclosures.
