= Organ donation in Australia =

Organ donation is when a person gives their organs after they die to someone in need of new organs. Transplantation is the process of transplanting the organs donated into another person. This process extends the life expectancy of a person suffering from organ failure. The number of patients requiring organ transplants outweighs the number of donor organs available.

== History of organ transplantation ==
Australia's first organ transplants were corneal transplants in the early 1940s. Following in chronological order are monumental first in Australia's organ transplantation history.

1. Early 1940s Australia began corneal transplants in Sydney and Melbourne
2. 1965 Australia's first successful (living) kidney transplant
3. 1984 Australia's first successful heart transplant
4. 1985 Australia's first successful liver transplant
5. 1985 Australia's first successful kidney transplant from a deceased donor
6. 1986 The Brisbane Technique for splitting livers to benefit three recipients initiated
7. 1986 Australia's first successful heart/lung transplant
8. 1987 Australia's first successful kidney/pancreas transplant
9. 1987 First segmental liver transplant (for children) (Australia)
10. 1989 First successful living liver transplant (Australia)
11. 1990 Australia's first successful single lung transplant
12. 2002 First single segment liver transplant on a baby (24 days old) (Australia)
13. 2003 Australia's first triple transplant (heart, lung, liver)
14. 2006 World's first kidney/liver/pancreas transplant (Australia)
15. 2012 Australia's first pediatric intestinal transplant (liver), (small bowel), (duodenum), (pancreas)

The following table (Table 1.1) shows the global transplantation milestones in chronological order.

=== Table 1.1. Global transplant milestones ===
Year	Milestone	Location
1823	First skin auto graft transplantation of skin tissue from one location on an individual to another location	Germany
1905	First human to human corneal transplant. This was also the first successful human to human transplant of any kind	Moravia (now Czech Republic)
1908	First skin allograft-transplantation of skin from a donor to a recipient	Switzerland
Early 1940s	Australia begins corneal transplants	Sydney and Melbourne
1954	First living related kidney transplant (identical twins)	US
1955	First heart valve allograft into descending aorta	Canada
1962	First kidney transplant from a deceased donor	US
1965	Australia's first successful (living) kidney transplant	Queen Elizabeth hospital. South Australia
1967	First successful liver transplant	US
1967	First heart transplant	South Africa
1968	First pancreas transplant	US
1979	Living related pancreas (mother to child)	US
1981	First heart/lung transplant	US
1983	First successful lung transplant	Canada
1983	Ciclosporin approved for commercial use in the US. A revolutionary anti-rejection drug, it heralded a new era for kidney, liver and heart transplantation	US
1984	First heart-liver transplant	US
1984	Australia's first successful heart transplant	St. Vincents hospital, NSW Australia
1985	Australia's first successful liver transplant	Princess Alexandra hospital, Brisbane Australia
1985	Australia's first successful kidney transplant from a deceased donor	Queen Elizabeth hospital, Adelaide Australia
1986	First successful double lung transplant	Canada
1986	The 'Brisbane Technique' for splitting livers to benefit three recipients initiated	Princess Alexandra hospital, Brisbane Australia
1986	Australia's first successful heart/lung transplant	St Vincent's hospital, NSW Australia
1987	Australia's first successful kidney/pancreas transplant	Westmead hospital, NSW Australia
1987	First segmental liver transplant (for children)	Princess Alexandra hospital QLD Australia
1988	First successful intestinal transplant	UK
1988	First successful liver-bowel transplant	UK
1988	First two in one liver transplant (one liver split for two recipients)	France
1989	First successful living liver transplant	Princess Alexandra hospital QLD Australia
1989	First combination heart, liver and kidney transplant	US
1990	First living related lung transplant	US
1990	Australia's first successful single lung transplant	St. Vincent's hospital NSW Australia
1992	Xenotransplant (pig liver to human)	US
1992	Xenotransplant (baboon's liver to human)	US
1995	World's first laparoscopic live donor nephrectomy in which a patient's kidney is removed through a 5–6 cm incision	US
1995	Transplantation of all abdominal organs	US
1998	First successful human hand transplant (later removed)	France
2002	First single segment liver transplant on a baby (24 days)	Princess Alexandra hospital, QLD Australia
2003	Australia's first triple transplant (heart, lung, liver)	Princess Alexandra hospital, QLD Australia
2005	First successful partial face transplant	France
2005	First living donor islet transplant	Japan
2006	World's first kidney/liver/pancreas transplant	Royal Prince Alfred hospital NSW Australia
2009	Paediatric transplant for small bowel, liver, pancreas and two kidneys	US

Table 1.1 Source: Australian Government Tissue Donation and Transplantation Authority. http://www.donatelife.gov.au

== Donor types ==
There are two types of donors; living donors and deceased donors.

=== Living donors ===
In Australia the most common living donations not including blood donations are kidneys and bone marrow. The tissues and organs that are able to be donated by a living donor are:

- Bone marrow
- Kidney
- Part of the liver
- Lung (this requires two living donors. One donates a lobe from their left lung and the other donates a lobe from their right lung)
- Part of the intestine
- Part of the pancreas

==== Eligibility for donation ====
The minimum age for living donation is 18 years of age. A person may be eligible to be a donor if they are free from HIV, cancer, systemic infection, sickle cell anaemia, Creutzfeldt–Jakob disease and they are not a previous IV drug user.

==== Motives for living donation ====
Donation to a family member is a common scenario. The reasons for a family member to want to be a living donor to their relatives are; a desire to help, self benefit (from loved ones improved health), a feeling of moral duty, pressure identification with the recipient, increased self-esteem from doing a good deed. It is the health professional's role to understand the difficulty of these situations involving relationships of loved friends or relatives and they are to determine whether or not the offer of donation is genuine or the living donor feels pressured into donating because of the seriousness of their loved ones organ failure. However most donations result in a positive psychological benefit to both the donor and recipient.

If a donor is wanting to donate to someone who is not a relative or friend they are intensively psychologically tested to determine their motives and suitability for donation as there can occasionally be harmful motives such as attention seeking or mental illness.

=== Deceased donors (non-heart beating donors) ===
Deceased donors have been declared dead and are maintained in ICU on ventilators so tissue oxygenation continues until the procedure of organ retrieval and cold preservation.

Deceased donors are divided into two sub-classes.

- Donation after brain death. A person is declared brain dead if there is complete loss of all brain function
- Donation after cardiac death. A person is declared cardiac dead if there is complete loss of all cardiac function

Both types of deceased donors have complete and irreversible damage and returning to life is impossible. Thorough testing is carried out prior to confirming a person brain dead or cardiac dead.

One deceased donor is able to save up to ten lives by donating the following:

- Organs: Kidneys, pancreas, liver, lungs, heart and intestines
- Tissues: Bones, skin, heart valves, veins and corneas

=== Whole body donation ===
After death some people choose to donate their bodies to science. These bodies are used in many teaching facilities and aid in teaching anatomy, surgical techniques or research. Whole body donation involves the deceased person contacting the university or teaching institution prior to death to obtain consent and cover the legalities involved. After death it is up to the family of the deceased to contact the chosen facility and arrange donation.

== Opt in versus opt out ==
Currently Australia's organ donation system is 'opt-in'. This means a person had to give consent (opt-in) to be a donor prior to their death, or their family can make the decision for them if they are considered a viable donor. The 'opt-out' system is used in several countries around the world. For this system everyone is placed on the donor list and must 'opt-out' if they do not wish to donate their organs. Whether Australia changes to the 'opt-out' system is constantly coming into question. In a discussion paper compiled in 2011 it was stated 35% of family members of a potential donor would refuse donation if they were unsure of the family members intentions on donating. However, if an 'opt-out' system was put into place and the potential donor did not opt-out prior to death, it was estimated only 20% of families would refuse donation.

A study carried out in 2002 investigated donor rates of countries with 'opt-in' and 'opt-out' systems. The countries chosen for the study were ones that had relatively similar backgrounds and health systems. After the donation rates were calculated to match the mortality rates it concluded the difference in donor rates between the two systems were marginal. The results as follows (Table 1.2).

=== Table 1.2. Three year mean organ donation and mortality rates for 10 European countries. ===
Country	Three year mean organ donation rates* (per million inhabitants)	Three year mean mortality rates† for organ donation (per million inhabitants)
Spain	33.8	309
Austria	23.5	298
Belgium	23.0	343
France	18.3	330
Italy	16.8	246
UK	13.2	243
Netherlands (I)	13.0	187
Germany (I)	12.6	240
Switzerland	12.5	195
Sweden	11.3	240

1. *The rates shown comply with the definition of the council of Europe: "if at least one solid organ has been retrieved for the purpose of organ donation"
2. †Mortality rates for CVA and (traffic) accidents 0–65 years
3. (I) indicates country has an 'opt-in' system

There are many pros and cons for each of the two systems, making it a controversial topic, and as seen above some studies can be contradicting. Ultimately it is the family of the deceased who will make the final decision on organ donation. Only 57% of Australians know the wishes of their family members in regards to organ donation, which has a large impact on families giving consent for organ donation. Donation cannot go ahead without families consent even if the person is on the donor register.

== Donation in religion ==
In most cases religions support organ donation. However, there are a few aspects of each religion that can make the logistics of organ donation difficult.

=== Islam ===
Most organ donations in predominately Muslim countries are live donations, for example in Iran in 2006 only 13% of renal transplants were from deceased donation. In Islam, violating the human body whether living or dead is forbidden, this includes organ donation. However, saving a life is ranked extremely highly in the Qur'an. Brain stem death (brain dead) is controversial in Islam. This, along with burial customs of Muslims being they have to be buried within 24 hours of death makes if difficult for organ donation.

=== Christianity ===
Generally Christianity approves of organ donation although some Christians believe principle healing is achieved through prayer. The majority of Christians see organ donation as Christian love or an act of devotion to God and mankind.

=== Judaism ===
The Jewish faith places great significance on avoiding unnecessary interference with cadavers and receiving benefit from a cadaver is prohibited. The body must also be buried within 24 hours of death. It is custom in Judaism to not interfere with death; organ donation procedures may be part of this. Only 8% of the Israel population are registered organ donors.

=== Hinduism ===
Hindu's believe in reincarnation and the good deeds of one's current lifetime will determine the fate of the next lifetime. Organ donation is seen as a good deed. Hasmukh Velji Shah of the World Council of Hindus stated "The import issue for Hindu is that which sustains life should be accepted and promoted as Dharma (righteous living). Organ donation is an integral part of our living."

=== Buddhism ===
Buddhists believe in rebirth. Brain death is also controversial for Buddhists as they believe the spirit remains in the body days after death and interfering with the body may affect a person's next rebirth. However, selfless giving is integral to Buddhism; therefore organ donation is up to the individual.

== Donor rates in Australia ==
Australian donor rates are on the rise. Between 2009 and 2013, donor numbers increased by 29%. In 2009 there were 11.4 donors per million population. By 2013 there were 16.9 donors per million population. (Table 1.3). In Australia around 1600 people are on the organ transplant waiting list at any time. Less than 1% of persons whose death is in hospital can be potential donors because of the limited circumstances for which organ donation is possible. In 2013 only 40% of patients on the organ waiting list received a transplant and 2% of the patients on the waiting list died while waiting for an organ.

=== Table 1.3: Donor rates in Australia per million population ===
Year	Organ donors per million population	Organ transplant recipients per million population	Organs transplanted per million population
2009	11.4	37.2	39.5
2010	14	42.8	45.1
2011	15.1	45.2	47.3
2012	15.6	46.3	48.8
2013	16.9	48.5	50.9

=== Table 1.4. Transplanted organs 2014 in Australia ===
Organ	Number
Kidneys	659
Livers	237
Hearts	79
Heart/Lungs	4
Lungs	159
Pancreas (including pancreas islets)	54
Total	1,193

== Australian Organ Donor Register ==
The Australian Organ Donor Register is a government register. People can register to be organ donors or they can register that they wish to not be an organ donor. The register is nationwide and is the only register in Australia. Registering can be done online at the Donate Life website.
