= Storm the Studio (radio program) =

Australian radio program

Storm the Studio was a radio program that aired on Australia's 3RRR FM radio station during the late 1980s and early 1990s. DJ "Steve Polak" presented the program, which focused on a combination of dance music tracks including house music, hip hop, industrial music and acid house. The program was notable for cultivating a large following within Melbourne's dance community and alongside Triple M's Live from the Ivy program, was one of Australia's first radio programs not to focus on rock or pop music.

The program's name was a reference to the cut and paste sampling style of the Meat Beat Manifesto album of the same name.

Storm The Studio was a radio program created by Melbourne-based brothers Steve and Roger Polak. Steve Polak was the on mic announcer and also remixed the music live using two Technics SL-1200 turntables with a Numark 1775 mixer. Roger produced the show and did pre-production work, editing interviews and specials. The program was aired on Melbourne radio station 3RRR during the late 1980s and into 1990.

The program, which began as a Saturday evening three-hour show (7-10 pm) in 1987, also spawned several side projects. One of these was the on-air dance party that ran under the Sonarr banner. These were 12 hour radio programs that featured many different dance and hip hop styles, interviews as well as plenty of guest DJs. Some of DJs included John Course, Mark Hogan and Andy Van. Steve Douglas was also a part of the Sonar team, working with the Polak brothers after having had success with his Triple M Live at The Ivy dance programs.

Sonarr and Storm The Studio were unusual programs in that they featured two live studios patched in so that they both could be on air simultaneously, with the second studio being used to remix listener phone calls. These were then sampled and added to the dance mix. This was known as the 'Transformation Line' and was introduced with a weird robotic voice that was generated using a Commodore 64. An old analogue vocoding keyboard was also used at times, as was an Ensoniq EPS 16+ sampler and a Casio FZ 1 sampler. Live beats and loops were often added to the Transformation line and live remixes of dance tracks were also produced. This had never been done before in Melbourne.

Storm The Studio was moved to Friday night and became more of a hard core hip hop and dance outlet at that time and led into Tranzmission, another well known underground 3RRR dance program hosted by Kate Bathgate. Roger Polak also did production work for that program and Steve was guest DJ a number of times, focusing on hard techno styles like Gabba House and artists on the Industrial Strength record label.

In 1990-91 Storm the Studio changed names, becoming the Kaos Engine and was moved to the 10-12 pm Saturday slot. At this time the program mixed more diverse samples from movies (notably Anime films) and even videogames in with the music. Guest presenters Jadon Williams (Jay Man) and Kallum Bluckland would join Steve to discuss videogames, technology and musical development between DJ sets. Steve Polak then also joined the 3RRR team behind one of the oldest technology programs on radio Byte into It. This program is still going, but with a different cast.

Storm The Studio, Sonarr, and Kaos Engine all featured what were at the time rare interviews with Hip Hop and Dance artists. At this point these styles were not mainstream and so such interviews weren't aired on mainstream radio in Australia. Some of the artists interviewed included; Ice T, Mase from De La Soul, PM Dawn, Cypress Hill, Ernie C from Bodycount, Lenny Dee, Cosmic Baby, Wreckx-n-Effect, Frank de Wulf, Jack Dangers from Meat Beat manifesto, Boyz II Men and Del the Funky Homosapien.

The program also accepted demo tapes from local artists and pushed pioneering talent, most notably Sydney based rap crew Def Wish Cast.
