= Bill Vickers =

Australian rules footballer, born 1904

Personal information
- Full name: William Thomas Vickers
- Born: 28 December 1902; Carlton, Victoria
- Died: 12 June 1975 (aged 72); Melbourne, Victoria
- Original team: Old Scotch Collegians
- Height: 171 cm (5 ft 7 in)
- Weight: 66 kg (146 lb)

Playing career^{1}
Years	Club	Games (Goals)
1927	Essendon	3 (4)
- ^{1} Playing statistics correct to the end of 1927.

William Thomas Vickers (28 December 1902 – 12 June 1975) was an Australian rules footballer who played with Essendon in the Victorian Football League (VFL).
