= John Burns (radio presenter) =

Australian radio presenter

- Born: 30 July 1945 (age 81)
- Other name: "Burnszo"
- Education: Christian Brothers College, St Kilda
- Alma mater: Monash University
- Occupations: Radio broadcaster Former barrister
- Predecessor: Dean Banks
- Spouse: Monique Burns

John Burns (born 30 July 1945) is an Australian radio presenter.

== Career ==
Burns's radio debut was in 1988 on community radio station 3RRR on the program Lawyers, Guns & Money as the character Sir Lunchalot. Later, the Sir Lunchalot character switched to commercial radio and became a regular Friday morning contributor to the 3AW breakfast show, providing humorous restaurant reviews and tips on dining etiquette.

In 2001, Burns joined Ross Stevenson as co-host of 3AW's breakfast program following the retirement of Dean Banks. Breakfast with Ross and John was the station's top rating program. Burns retired from 3AW in July 2020 with his last show on Friday 31 July. John was replaced by Russel Howcroft.

Prior to his career in radio, he had an established career as a barrister. Burns was a Victorian crown prosecutor and practised law for 22 years.

== Awards ==
- 2011 Australian Commercial Radio Awards (ACRA) Winner Best On-air Team – Metro AM (joint winner with on-air partner, Ross Stevenson)

== Personal life ==
John Burns is married to Monique and they have three sons. He used to speak fondly on-air of his adopted former "death row" dog nicknamed Rocky (formerly called Rocca, because its black and white colour was reminiscent of Collingwood players Saverio and Anthony Rocca). After Rocky's death, he adopted another dog, named Gus.

His son Andrew Burns is an actor, comedian and the founder of Question One, London's largest quiz night company.

Burns is a passionate Melbourne Demons supporter in the AFL.

On 25 January 2018 Burns was convicted of drink driving, after pleading guilty in the Melbourne Magistrates Court. He apologised on-air for his actions.
