= Australian Organ Donor Register =

The Australian Organ Donor Register (AODR) is a government register, recording individuals who have agreed to donate organs and tissues in the event of their death. The register is operated by the Organ and Tissue Authority (OTA) and Services Australia through Medicare.

== Operation ==
The register is a record of consent for legal purposes. Authorized medical personnel may access the register to see what an individual chose, but the family is also consulted and can veto/overrule AODR consent status. The AODR has no part in the actual transplant process, nor does it maintain lists of prospective recipients.

The deceased's family is also told what the register says and they're asked if he or she had changed their mind, or if the family has sincerely held objections to donation. Potential donors are encouraged to discuss their decision with their family to ensure their wishes are known to them. An individual may consent to the use of all organs and tissues, or just some (if someone has strong views about particular body parts for instance). The consent is entirely voluntary and may be changed or withdrawn at any time. The register is only for organ donation; it does not cover other uses for organs such as scientific research.

An individual must be 18 years or older to give their consent, but 16- and 17-year-olds may record an intention to donate. When only an intention is recorded the family will be asked to give consent in the event of death.

== History ==
The AODR established in 2000 as a record of intentions, using data from state-based driver's licences. Driver's licences had for many years included a box to tick for those who intended to donate their organs. Since this was only an intention it was the deceased's family who were required to give consent. Except in South Australia, driver's licences now no longer include an organ donation question, and instead, licensing authorities may encourage individuals to consider lodging an intent with AODR.

From 1 July 2005 the AODR has allowed a legal consent to be recorded. Existing registered donors (whether from their driver's licence or separately) were asked to re-register when this was introduced, giving consent rather than just indicating an intention.

In February 2006 an organ register section was added to the Medicare rebate claim form and the organ donation campaign extended to Centrelink offices. About 5 million people had registered at that time and the hope was that it could be further increased.

In 2017, a very simple registration form was created for the landing page of the DonateLife Network's website, making it easier for the public to register as organ donors. OTA manages the implementation of the national reform program to improve organ and tissue donation and transplantation outcomes in Australia. This is done through leadership of, and collaboration with, State and Territory Medical Directors, DonateLife Agencies (one in each state and territory) and hospital medical and nurse specialists in organ and tissue donation; these people and organisations comprise the DonateLife Network.
