= Jeff McGee =

Australian rules footballer

Personal information
- Full name: Jeffrey Daniel McGee
- Nickname: Torch
- Born: 27 January 1948 (age 78)
- Original team: Middle Park
- Height: 184 cm (6 ft 0 in)
- Weight: 89 kg (196 lb)

Playing career^{1}
Years	Club	Games (Goals)
1967–1968	South Melbourne	8 (8)
- ^{1} Playing statistics correct to the end of 1967.

Jeffrey Daniel "Torch" McGee OAM (born 27 January 1948) is a former professional Australian rules football player for South Melbourne and member of the Coodabeen Champions. McGee played seven games for South Melbourne in the 1966 and 1967 VFL seasons and scored a goal with his first league kick.

As part of the 2022 Queen's Birthday Honours, McGee was awarded a Medal of the Order of Australia alongside five other members of the Coodabeen Champions for "service to the performing arts, and to radio".
