= Russel Howcroft =

Australian businessman and television personality

Russel Howcroft (born c. 1965) is an Australian businessman and media personality best known as a panellist on the ABC television program Gruen.

Howcroft is currently host of Breakfast with Ross & Russel on 3AW.

Howcroft grew up in the Melbourne suburb of Malvern and attended Scotch College in Hawthorn. He is a passionate Melbourne Demons supporter and has served as a club board member.

== Career ==
Howcroft is the former national CEO of advertising agency George Patterson Y&R (now known as Y&R ANZ).

In February 2013, Howcroft was appointed as Executive General Manager of Network Ten and remained in the position until February 2017 before moving to PwC just months before the network was placed into voluntary administration. Howcroft holds a Bachelor of Business (Marketing) from Monash University.

In May 2017, Howcroft was appointed Chair of the Australian Film, Television and Radio School.

=== Radio ===
In September 2011, it was announced Howcroft would host Saturdays on the Weekend Break afternoon program on 3AW, whilst Tom Elliott filled in for Derryn Hinch on the drive program.

In June 2020, 3AW announced that Howcroft will join 3AW Breakfast from Monday 3 August, following John Burns' retirement from radio. In December 2021, 3AW Breakfast won an ACRA for Best On-Air Team AM.

=== Television ===
Howcroft has been a regular panellist on Gruen since the program's inception in 2008 and has also been guest panellist on news-chat show The Project. He also fronted the documentary series How Australia Got Its Mojo, which aired on the ABC in 2019.

=== Business ===
Chair of the Australian Film Television and Radio School and the co-founder of The Grid Melbourne, a festival designed to bring entrepreneurs and innovators together expected to launch in 2022. He is the Chief Creative Officer and a founding partner of Sayers Group.

=== Publishing ===
He has written/co-written three books: When It's Right to be Wrong, The Right-brain Workout, and The Right-brain Workout 2.
