= Ross Stevenson (radio presenter) =

Australian radio presenter (born 1957)

- Born: 25 August 1957 (age 69); Australia
- Education: Trinity Grammar School, Kew; Melbourne University
- Occupation: Talkback radio presenter
- Employer: 3AW

Ross Stevenson (born Ross Campbell; 25 August 1957) is an Australian radio presenter on Melbourne station 3AW. The lighthearted breakfast news and gossip show, Breakfast with Ross & Russel, is one of Australia's successful radio shows.

== Career ==
He attended Trinity Grammar School in Melbourne, where he was Dux of the school. After leaving Trinity he studied at Melbourne University. Stevenson's initial career was as a lawyer at Melbourne law firm Darvall McCutcheon and then at Slater & Gordon. In 1985, while still a lawyer, Stevenson began his radio career on community station 3RRR where he partnered with fellow lawyer Denis Connell on a show called Lawyers, Guns and Money, a reference from a Warren Zevon song ("Send lawyers, guns and money, the shit has hit the fan"). Denis Connell was known as "Donoghue", and together as "Donoghue & Stevenson", in reference to one of the most famous negligence cases that every legal studies and law student would have heard about in class.

After four years building a cult following at 3RRR, Stevenson and Connell were recruited by 3AK and joined by anchorman Dean Banks. In 1990, they crossed to 3AW where they continued to build audience following. Connell was sacked in 1991 by program director Steve Price.

For the following 10 years Stevenson and Banks established themselves and their style as a ratings success. In December 2000, Banks decided to retire, again leaving Stevenson to find a new partner.

From 2001, John Burns joined Stevenson as co-host. Burns had previously been a regular Friday morning contributor to the show as the character, 'Sir Lunchalot', providing humorous restaurant reviews and tips on dining etiquette. Burns retired in July 2020 and was replaced by Russel Howcroft.

Breakfast with Ross and Russel is the station's top rating program and Stevenson is a highly regarded radio presenter by the public and many of his peers. He is believed to be Australia's highest paid breakfast broadcaster, and in 2011, signed a lucrative eight-year contract with 3AW.

== Television ==
Stevenson is also known for co-writing the comic television series The Games with John Clarke which starred Clarke, Gina Riley, Bryan Dawe and Nicholas Bell. The Games satirised the Sydney Organising Committee for the Olympic Games (SOCOG). They also co-wrote A Royal Commission into the Australian Economy.

== Awards ==
- 2011 Australian Commercial Radio Awards (ACRA) Winner Best On-air Team – Metro AM (joint winner with on-air partner, John Burns)

== Personal life ==
Stevenson and his former partner, Sarah Fallshaw, share a son and a daughter. The pair separated in early 2025. Additionally, Stevenson has two other sons from a previous relationship with Jamie Wilczek.

In 1971, at 14 years of age, Stevenson was part of a choir which featured on the Colleen Hewett song "Day By Day" produced by Molly Meldrum.

Stevenson is a keen punter, horse-racing enthusiast and owner.

Stevenson is a keen Hawthorn Football Club supporter. He played over 100 games for VAFA club University Reds (now part of Fitzroy Football Club).

== Interests ==
- Hawthorn Football Club
