= Coodabeen Champions =

Australian sports comedy group

The Coodabeen Champions (often referred to as The Coodabeens) are an Australian comedy team.

In February 2024 the Coodabeen Champions announced their retirement from radio broadcasting after 43 years.

== Coodabeens Footy Show ==
The program began in 1981 on 3RRR and has twice moved to the ABC. The show's name, Coodabeen Champions, was provided by Billy Baxter about six months after its first broadcast. . The show was mainly focused on Australian rules football, with the Coodabeens discussing current sports events and news in a humorous manner, also interviewing numerous retired football players and commentators. Its members included Jeff Richardson, Ian Cover, Greg Champion, "Torch" McGee and Baxter. Simon Whelan had a hiatus from the show while serving as a judge of the Supreme Court of Victoria, but returned in April 2020 for the final four years after his retirement from his full-time position as a Judge of the Court of Appeal. Former members of the group include Tony Leonard.

The show included various regular segments. The show is most remembered for its talk-back paradies, Greg Champions' songs and Guru Bob: a fictional Guru – he has belonged to various religions – who claims to relate advice to Australian Football League players and coaches who "visit the temple", often giving them comical spins on well-known philosophical quotes as this advice. He is described as the Coodabeens' Special Adviser on Football Spirituality and has released numerous books of football quotes.

== Awards ==
In 2003, the Coodabeen Champions were inducted into the MCG Media Hall of Fame. The Coodabeens also had the honour of playing a four-song set for the half-time show at the 1987 VFL Grand Final.They sang at the Grand Final again in 1995.
