= 3RRR =

Triple R FM
- Melbourne; Australia
- Broadcast area: Melbourne
- Frequencies: 102.7 MHz FM; DAB+ (2010– )

Programming
- Language: English
- Format: Community radio

Ownership
- Owner: Triple R Broadcasters Ltd

History
- First air date: 17 November 1976; 49 years ago

Technical information
- Licensing authority: ACMA
- ERP: 56,000 watts
- Transmitter coordinates: 37.8385°S 145.3465°E

Links
- Public licence information: Profile
- Webcast: Live Stream – Simulcast of Melbourne FTA service: HTTP AAC+ 32kb stream; HTTP MP3 128kb stream

3RRR (pronounced "Three Triple R," or simply "Triple R") is an Australian community radio station, based in Melbourne.

3RRR first commenced broadcasting in 1976 from the studios of 3ST, the student radio station of the Royal Melbourne Institute of Technology (now RMIT University), on an educational licence with the name 3RMT. In 1979 it relocated to Fitzroy and adopted its present name. During the late 1970s and early 1980s, it became synonymous with the post-punk and new wave subcultures. In late 2004, supporters raised enough money for the station to purchase and move into new premises on the corner of Blyth and Nicholson Streets in Brunswick East after the 20-year lease on their previous studios, in Victoria Street, Fitzroy, expired.

3RRR's mission statement was defined in 1990 as "To educate, inform and entertain by drawing upon appropriate community resources. To develop a critical approach to contemporary culture." Triple R's programming is divided into approximately 70% specialist music and 30% talk-based shows. Hosts have creative control over content, and the station does not have playlists. As such, the nature of 3RRR broadcasts varies wildly depending on the time of the week. As 3RRR states, "With the exception of [the] Breakfasters, all of Triple R’s programs are presented by volunteers" who present their shows for no remuneration. A select few volunteer presenters are also in paid work at the station in operational roles.

Community sponsorships and public subscribers (currently around 15,000) fund 3RRR's operations entirely, removing standard commercial pressures to allow for this diverse programming. The estimated current listenership is 440,000 per week. Due to the reaction from subscribers, in the late 1990s, 3RRR cancelled sponsorship deals signed with Ford and music venue The Mercury Lounge (due to its location in Melbourne's Crown Casino). No such "corporate" sponsorship of this type has been considered since.

In 2009, 3RRR opened its performance space for live music, live comedy and literary events, among others. In 2016, 3RRR was inducted into the Music Victoria Hall of Fame.

The station celebrated its 40th birthday in 2016 with a three-month-long collaborative exhibition, ON AIR: 40 years of 3RRR at the State Library Victoria.

== Past programs ==
- Against The Arctic (ceased 2011)
- All over the shop
- The Architects (ceased 2014)
- Atomic (ceased 2007)
- Aural Text (ceased 2013)
- Australian Mood
- Beat in the Street
- Beats Electric (ceased 2009)
- Bedlam (1980–86, with Merryn Gates & Julie Purvis)
- Best of the Brat (ceased)
- Blokes You Can Trust
- Burn Rubber (ceased 2006)
- Bullying The Jukebox
- Can You Dig It
- Calamity
- The Cheese Shop (ceased 1999)
- Chicken Mary
- Convict Streak
- Coodabeen Champions (moved to ABC Local Radio)
- Cocoa Butter (ceased)
- Cyber
- Dance Cadaverous
- Danger: Low Brow
- Deep Sea Music Show
- Delivery
- Discrete Music Show
- Dirty Deeds (ceased 2014)
- Drivetime in Iceland
- Dynamite
- Erotic City
- The F'n'K Show
- Fast Fictions (ceased 1996)
- Feed Your Head (ceased)
- Film Buffs Forecast (ceased)
- Galactic Zoo (ceased 2007)
- Give Men A Pause (1979–1981)
- Greening the Apocalypse (ceased 2019)
- Guy Smiley Presents
- Heathers on Fire (ceased 2014)
- Hellzapoppin' (ceased 2014)
- High In The Saddle
- Italmusic (1984/1988)
- Incoming
- I'd Rather Jack (ceased 2009)
- Keystrokes (ceased 1992)
- Kinky Afro (ceased 2014)
- Know Your Product (1978)
- Lawyers, Guns, & Money (moved to 3AW)
- The Liars' Club (Ceased 1995)
- Lime Champions (ceased 2013)
- Long Grass Sessions (ceased)
- Midweek Crisis (ceased)
- Mondo Bizarro
- Morning Dawning
- Mousetrap
- My Three Sons
- MegaBat
- Mr Knowitall
- New, Used & Abused (ceased 2000)
- No Pants (ceased 2014)
- Noise in My Head
- Old Folk Show (ceased 2006)
- Osso Booko Show (1991–1997)
- The Pinch (ceased)
- Plonk (podcast and broadcast during Summer 2008/09)
- Punter to Punter
- Rack Your Brains (ceased)
- Rhythmatic (ceased)
- The Rhino Show
- Run Like You Stole Something (ceased 2008)
- The Skull Cave
- Set It Out
- Shake Some Action
- Sitelines (ceased)
- Slanted And Enchanted (ceased 2006)
- Smoke 'Em If You Got 'Em (ceased 2009)
- The Spin (ceased 2006)
- The Cave (ceased 2023)
- Spoke (ceased 2016)
- Station to Station
- Storm the Studio (ceased)
- Street Talk
- Superfluity (ceased 2025)
- Symbiosis (ceased 2007)
- Tiger Beat
- Top Billin
- Top Ranking Sound (ceased 2007)
- Tomorrow Never Knows
- Transference
- Trash Is My Life
- Underground Flavas (ceased 2005)
- The Village
- VPL (Visible Panty Lines)
- Wake in Fright (ceased 2006)
- Wax Lyrical
- Weird Groovin'
- Wheels of Steel
- Whole Lotta Shonky
- Wig-Wam Bam
- Wired for Sound
- The Word (2001–2008)
- Wordburner (ceased 2007)

== Selected list of presenters, past and present ==
- Adam Crow (a.k.a. Bob Console) (Keystrokes)
- Adam Joseph (The Liars' Club 1992–1995)
- Andrew Haug (The Hard Report)
- Alan Parkes (Osso Booko Show)
- Alexandra Heller-Nicholas (Plato's Cave)
- Allan Thomas (The Metal for Melbourne Show)
- Amy Mullins (Uncommon Sense)
- Annaliese Redlich (Neon Sunset)
- Alan Eaton (Osso Booko Show)
- Anita Alphabet (Test Pattern)
- Anthony Carew (The International Pop Underground)
- Andrew Delaney (Banana Lounge Broadcasting)
- Areej Nur (The Rap)
- 'Bandicoot' (Osso Booko Show)
- Billy Baxter (The Coodabeen Champions)
- Bohdan X (Friday punk show, 1978–1995)
- 'Brain' (Rack Your Brains)
- Brendan Hitchens (Bullying The Jukebox)
- Bruce Berryman (Sitelines, Metropolis Now)
- Bruce Milne (Where Yo Is?)
- Brian Wise & Billy Pinnell (Off The Record)
- Bruce Berryman (Sitelines)
- Cam Smith (Eat It)
- Carlos T (Hood Pass)
- Casey Bennetto (Superfluity)
- Cerise Howard (Plato's Cave)
- Clinton Walker (Know Your Product, 1978)
- Chris Kennett (The Pinch 2002–2009 / Unexplained Phenomena 2000–2002)
- Chris Hatzsis
- Christos Tsiolkas (Superfluity)
- Claire Hedger (Australian Matinee)
- Craig Kamber
- Headley Gritter (The Party Show)
- Declan Fay (The Pinch 2002–2009 / Unexplained Phenomena 2000–2002)
- Declan Kelly (Against the Arctic)
- Dave Butterworth (Galactic Zoo)
- Dave Graney (Banana Lounge Broadcasting)
- Dave O'Neil (Osso Booko Show / Breakfasters)
- Dave Slutzkin (To and Fro)
- Dave Taranto (The Cheese Shop)
- David Armstrong (Danger: Low Brow)
- David Bridie (Discrete Music Show)
- Davide Carbone (Ryhthmatic)
- David Dawson (High in the Saddle)
- David Lescun
- Denise Hylands (Twang!, Selections and Breakfasters)
- Derek G Smiley (Guy Smiley Presents)
- Dr Turf (Punter to Punter)
- Duane d. Zigliotto (presenter) 1984/1988.
- Elizabeth McCarthy (Multi-Storied)
- Emerald Cowell (Tomorrow Never Knows)
- Ennio Styles (Stylin')
- Fee B-Squared (aka Fee Bamford-Bracher)
- Fran Kelly (Backchat)
- Frankie Mazzone (Young at Art)
- Fiona Scott-Norman (Trash Is My Life, The F'n'K Show)
- Gavin Craig (Erotic City)
- Greig Pickhaver
- Genevieve Blackmore (a.k.a. Genny B) (LiveWire)
- Geraldine Hickey (Breakfasters)
- Greg Champion (The Coodabeen Champions)
- Gary Young (Chicken Mary Show)
- Georgia Webster (Byte into It / Superlinguo on Breakfasters)
- Holly C (a.k.a. Marieke Hardy), Glenny G (a.k.a. Glen Dickie) & Paul P (a.k.a. Paul Trapani) (Best of the Brat)
- Howard Marklin (Networks, Discrete Music Show)
- Ian Drysdale (The Liars' Club 1992–1993)
- Jane Gazzo (Calamity 1992–1996)
- Janet A McLeod (The Cheese Shop)
- James Young (The Breakfasters/former Program Director)
- Jason Moore (Local And/Or General)
- Jess McGuire (Breakfasters, Wired For Sound, I'd Rather Jack)
- Josh Kinal & Meshel Laurie (Enough Rope)
- Jonathan Alley (Under the Sun/Tough Culture)
- Jon Clyne (a.k.a. Johnnie Wafer) (Keystrokes)
- Jon Von Goes (The JVG Radio Method)
- John Safran (breakfasters)
- Julian Schiller (Crud)
- Johnny Topper (New & Groovy)
- Josh Nelson (Plato's Cave)
- Justin Kemp (Run Like You Stole Something)
- Karen Leng (Kinky Afro)
- Kate Bathgate (Tranzmission)
- Kate Kingsmill (The Distant Sky)
- Kate Langbroek (The F'n'K Show / Breakfasters)
- Keith Glass (High in the Saddle)
- Lady Erica (Underground Flavas)
- Lawrence Hudson (New, Used & Abused)
- Louise Irving (Multi-Storied)
- Luke Pocock (Set It Out)
- Mark O'Toole (Osso Booko Show)
- Matt Rocke (Cyber) Australian Electronic
- Max Crawdaddy (Son of Crawdaddy)
- Namila Benson
- Nick Davis (Feed Your Head)
- Neil Rogers (The Australian Mood, member of The Bo-Weevils)
- Owen McKern (Delivery)
- Paul Elliott (Shake Some Action & The Rhino Show)
- Paul Harris & John Flaus (Filmbuff's Forecast)
- Phil Wales (Byte into It / Monday Yawning)
- Philip Brophy & Bruce Milne (EEEK!)
- Richard Watts (SmartArts)
- 'Rochachelli' (Osso Booko Show)
- Rob Jan (Zero G)
- Rob Steezy (Hood Pass)
- Sam Cummins (Press Colour)
- Sam Pang (Breakfasters)
- Samira Farah (The Score)
- Santo Cilauro
- Simon Winkler (Breaking & Entering)
- Stephen Oliver, Kraig Krieger & John Williams (Steve & The Board / Cut The Music)
- Steve Wide (Far and Wide) New UK Indie
- Stephen Walker (The Skullcave / former Program Director)
- Stratos Pavlis (Some Velvet Morning & Breakfasters)
- Stuart Harrison (The Architects)
- Stuart Harvey (Mondo Bizarro)
- Systa BB (The Good, The Dub & The Global)
- Tim Cole (Deep Sea Music Show)
- Tim Thorpe (Vital Bits)
- Tim Shiel (To and Fro)
- Tara Judah (Plato's Cave)
- Tracee Hutchison (The Word 2001–2007/Program Director 2002–2005)
- Tony Wilson (The Breakfasters)
- Tony Biggs (The Big Stain, On the Blower)
- Tracy Harvey (Punter to Punter)
- Thomas Caldwell (Plato's Cave)
- Troy Rainbow (Arts Diary)
- Vanessa Toholka (Byte into It)
- Vanda Hamilton (The Liars' Club 1994–1995)
- Vic Plume (Osso Booko Show)
- Warren Davies (Byte into It)
- Woody McDonald (Wig-Wam Bam / The Cave)
- Zan Rowe (Transit Lounge)
- Zerin Dellal (Ms Informed)

== Awards ==
=== Music Victoria Awards ===
The Music Victoria Awards are an annual awards night celebrating Victorian music. They commenced in 2006.

Year	Nominee / work	Award	Result
Music Victoria Awards of 2016	3RRR	Hall of Fame	inducted
