= Y&R ANZ =

Australasian advertising agency

- Type: Subsidiary
- Industry: Integrated Marketing Communications
- Headquarters: Level 15, 35 Clarence St; Sydney
- Parent: WPP plc
- Website: www.yranz.com

Y&R ANZ (formerly known as George Patterson Y&R) is an Australasian advertising agency. The agency was formed in 2005 when the international advertising holding conglomerate WPP Group acquired the Australian marketing communications company, The Communications Group (TCG).

== History ==
The George Patterson agency was founded on 1 November 1934. George Patterson had started his advertising career at the age of 18 in 1908. He left McPherson's in 1913 and took on the job of advertising manager at a magazine in New York, before returning to Australia at the outbreak of war in 1914. In 1919, he started his first agency in a partnership with Norman Catts and Catts-Patterson became Australia's largest agency.

One of the agency's early clients was Palmolive. In 1921, George Patterson offered to launch the brand in Australia.

The agency represented the Australian Defence Force for 13 years before they lost their contract with them in 2013 to competitors Havas.

In 2017, George Patterson Y&R (GPY&R) was rebranded to Y&R ANZ.

== Mergers and acquisitions ==
TCG's primary advertising asset was the George Patterson agency which had dominated the Australian advertising market throughout the 2nd half of the 20th century. Known as "Patts" in the industry, the business had been George Patterson Advertising from its formation in 1934 when George Patterson demerged the Sydney and Melbourne business he had started in 1918 from Catts-Patterson; George Patterson Bates from the 1990s, when the agency's long-standing Asian affiliation with Bates Worldwide was formalised with an acquisition by Bates, then one of the two worldwide network holdings of Saatchi & Saatchi PLC; and George Patterson Partners at the time of the WPP acquisition, having been primed for sale under that name by the TCG management-buyout group since 2003.

WPP merged the Australian offices of its worldwide Young & Rubicam brand with George Patterson. WPP acquired the worldwide Young & Rubicam brand in 2000.

== Accolades ==
- Cannes Lions 2012 Australian Agency of the Year
- World's Top Ten Agencies, Gunn Report 2013
- Cannes Lions 2019 Outdoor of the Year (Gold and Silver Lion)

== Australian Defence Force contract ==
The agency attracted controversy in May 2011 after it won a contract to "clean up" the social media policy of the Australian Defence Force (ADF) as some of the social media posts by GPYR were sexually or politically controversial. This included then CEO, Russel Howcroft's Facebook page which showed him to be a member of the "Pippa Middleton Ass Appreciation Society". A spokesperson for George Patterson Y&R stated: "We do not believe that this material is in any way relevant to an assessment of the nature or quality of the professional services that GPY&R provides." Earlier that month, the ADF "side-stepped" allegations that they had a conflict of interest in awarding the contract to George Patterson Y&R.
