= 3AW =

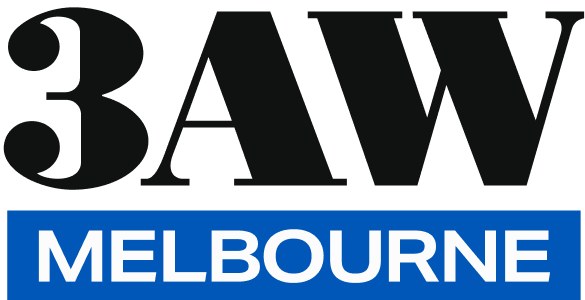

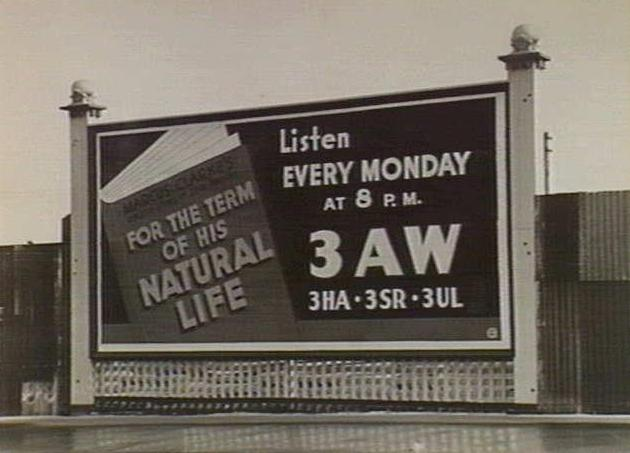
- A 1940s billboard advertising For the Term of his Natural Life in Melbourne
- Melbourne; Australia
- Broadcast area: Melbourne RA1
- Frequencies: AM: 693 kHz; DAB+: 9B Melbourne

Programming
- Language: English
- Format: Talk radio

Ownership
- Owner: Tapt Media; (Radio 3AW Melbourne Pty Ltd)
- Sister stations: 2GB; 4BC; 6PR

History
- First air date: 22 September 1932; 94 years ago
- Former frequencies: AM: 1425 kHz (1932–1935); AM: 1280 kHz (1935–1978); AM: 1278 kHz (1978–2006)
- Call sign meaning: Allans/The Age and Williamson, founding owners, 3 for Victoria

Technical information
- Licensing authority: Australian Communications and Media Authority
- Power: 5,000 watts
- Transmitter coordinates: 37.7997°S 144.6147°E

Links
- Public licence information: Profile
- Webcast: Listen Live
- Website: www.3aw.com.au

3AW is a talkback radio station based in Melbourne, Australia, owned by Tapt Media. It broadcasts on 693 kHz AM. It began transmission on 22 February 1932 as Melbourne's fifth commercial radio station.

== History ==
3AW was established when a company formed by Allans Music, JC Williamson's and David Syme (then publishers of The Age newspaper) was granted a radio broadcasting licence, with the first broadcast on 22 February 1932. The A in 3AW comes from the names of "Allans" and "The Age"; and the W is from "J. C. Williamson".

It is the only one of Melbourne's original eight stations that has retained its original name. (In comparison, Sydney, the only other Australian city with eight original stations had, until 2022, five of them still using their original names, but there are now only three such stations, namely 2GB, 2SM, 2UE.)

3AW has consistently appeared high in ratings surveys.

In 1931/1932, 3AW was one of two organisations that applied for a licence for a new Melbourne radio station; the other contender being the Roman Catholic Archdiocese of Melbourne. At the time, the Postmaster-General's Department was responsible for the issuing of all radio station licences, and it came out in favour of the 3AW application on the grounds that it had recently issued a licence to 2SM Sydney, on behalf of the Roman Catholic Church. However, a condition was placed on the 3AW licence to the effect that they had to provide one hour of free broadcasting to the Roman Catholic Church, at a time decided upon by the Church; hence The Catholic Hour was broadcast every Sunday night at was then a peak listening time, namely 9.00pm.

The fact that The Catholic Hour was originally broadcast in peak listening time is emphasised by the fact the program was preceded by two of Australia's most listened-to programs, namely Quiz Kids and Caltex Radio Theatre

In latter years, the nostalgia program Remember When was broadcast both prior to, and after The Catholic Hour. Therefore, in the 1990s (confirmation needed) 3AW management, ignorant of its history, decided to scrap The Catholic Hour and let Remember When continue right through the evening. Not surprisingly, the Church objected and the Australian Communications and Media Authority was called in to adjudicate. Their compromise decision was that the program should continue, but that the time should be decided upon by 3AW rather than by the Church. Not surprisingly 3AW moved the program to an hour that had the least listeners of every time in the week; namely midnight to 1.00am on Sunday mornings. This meant that there were hardly any listeners to the program and, within just a few months, the Church scrapped The Catholic Hour altogether!

In 1938 the Macquarie Broadcasting Service was formed, with stations right across Australia, including 3AW in Melbourne. In 2015 the Macquarie Media Group was acquired by Fairfax Media and the name was changed to Nine Radio.

3AW's first studio was situated in His Majesty's Theatre from whence it broadcast from 1932 to 1935.

The 3AW studios are now located at Media House, 655 Collins Street, Melbourne where it shares facilities with Magic 1278, the Australian Financial Review and The Age newspapers. After moving from their original studios at His Majesty's Theatre, the station was re-sited at 382 Latrobe Street, where it remained for most of the next 55 years. However, during renovations at 382 Latrobe Street, 3AW moved into the former premises of the ABC in Melbourne Place, a laneway off Russell Street, near Little Collins Street, which is now the premises of the Kelvin Club. Then, from 1991 until March 2010, the station broadcast from studios located at Bank Street, South Melbourne.

3AW's original broadcast frequency was 1425 kHz and changed to 1280 kHz on 1 September 1935 as part of a national reshuffle of the radio broadcasting spectrum. On 23 November 1978 the station changed to 1278 kHz with the introduction of 9 kHz spacing on the AM band. Due to poor reception problems, at 7:15 am on 1 May 2006, 3AW swapped with its sister station Magic to its present frequency of 693 kHz. The station's broadcast signal originates from a transmitter in Werribee.

In the 1950s, 3AW purchased 3CV in Maryborough in Central Victoria, which the "CV" nomenclature represents. For many years, 3AW programming was broadcast on 3CV after about 6.00pm.

== Broadcasters ==
- Darren James has hosted weekend morning programs for 34 years
- Ross Stevenson has been at the station for 32 years.
- Russel Howcroft has hosted 3AW Breakfast for 5 years.
- Peter "Grubby" Stubbs has hosted weekend afternoons for 14 years.

A number of people spent many years at 3AW in the past. Most of these are on the "3AW presenters" list (see "External Links" below). They include:

- Philip Brady was with the station for 35 years (1971, 1990–2025) hosting Nightline and Remember When with Bruce Mansfield and Simon Owens.
- Neil Mitchell was with the station for 36 years (1987–2023) and filled a number of roles and hosted Mornings for 34 years. On 1 September 2023, Mitchell announced that he would retire on 1 December 2023 and this has occurred. (3AW announced that Tom Elliott, Tony Moclair and Jacqueline Felgate will host Mornings, Afternoons and Drive from January 2024 following Neil Mitchell's retirement.)
- David McGee who spent 31 years at 3AW, 1955–1986
- Geoff Manion's 29 years (1956–1985),
- Martha Gardener who was at the station for 30 years, from 1952 to 1982
- Norman Banks, 26 years, 1952–1978
- Football commentator Rex Hunt was with the station from 1989 to 2009 and again 2017–2021
- The Revd. Alex Kenworthy presented the Nightline program for 20 years, 1971–1991
- Fred Tupper was responsible for sporting and general programming, including the Nicky & Tuppy breakfast session, during his 21 years at the station, 1933–1954
- One of 3AW's announcers when the station commenced in 1932 was John Masters who presented a request program, Choice of the People for many years. 30 minute segments of Choice of the People were broadcast at various times throughout the day. A photo in the 1987 history of the station shows that he was a member of the original 1932 broadcasting staff; and then there is a website that highlights the fact that he was still broadcasting in 1951, 19 years later; memories from listeners (not substantiated) show that his career continued for over a decade after that
- Peter James (father of Darren James) was with the station for at least 18 years (1959–1987), although some sources suggest that he was with the station for at least 20 years.
- Derryn Hinch broadcast at a number of radio and television stations and was at 3AW from 1979 to 1987, 2000–2001 and again from 2003 to 2012, a total of 23 years. However, he was often off the air (particularly during his last stint) due to suspension, poor health and house arrest.
- Harry Beitzel was a football commentator on 3AW for 17 years, from 1972 to 1989, and in 2005 he rejoined 3AW as a semi-regular contributor to Rex Hunt's pre-match show.
- Clifford Nicholls Whitta, or Nicky Whitta, usually referred to as Nicky Nicholls or simply Nicky, was at 3AW from 1932 to 1946. Whilst he may not have been at 3AW for as long a period as that of some of his confreres, he played an important role at the station. He presented the Nicky and Tuppy breakfast session with Fred Tupper (see above), and was also the name behind the extremely popular children's session which commenced in 1933. His partner in the children's session was Kathleen Lindgreen who broadcast under the name Nancy Lee. In 1935 Nicky and Kathleen Lindgreen were married.

== Charitable Appeals ==
=== Royal Women's Hospital ===
During the 1950s, 60s & 70s, most Melbourne commercial radio stations conducted annual appeals for a specific charity. In 3AW's case, every Mother's Day, an appeal was conducted for the Royal Women's Hospital, with donations acknowledged on air. In latter years, former announcer Ray Chapman had control of the appeal as a full-time paid position with 3AW.

=== Royal Children's Hospital ===
The annual Good Friday appeal for the Royal Children's Hospital Melbourne commenced in 1931, and was a minor event with small sums raised each year. However, when 3DB became involved in 1942, and began acknowledging donations on air, the amounts raised increased in one year by about 800%. 3DB and its successors 3TT and 101.1 TT-FM continued to support the appeal for a few years. However, 3AW has been the radio outlet for the appeal for a number of years now. 3AW works closely on the appeal with the main media outlet HSV 7.

== Technical innovations ==
In April 2007, 3AW introduced cameras into their main studio so that fans, via the 3AW website, can watch the program being broadcast, as well as listen. The cameras do not operate during news services, commercial breaks, or outside broadcasts.

In August 2009, 3AW "went digital", offering a superior quality sound and other features, for those with digital receivers. Stations utilising the digital signal can also offer multi-channels and interactive features. The digital format used in Australia is DAB+, reportedly a superior technology to other digital formats. the digital signal is not rebroadcast in road tunnels like the AM signal and does not have the distance range of AM.

In October 2011 (iPhone) and mid-2012 (Android), 3AW introduced an application (App) for smartphones or tablets. The application allows users to listen to the current program, read or listen to current news articles, get weather updates, contact the station via phone, email, Twitter or Facebook and also has an alarm clock feature.

== 3AW Football (AFL) ==
3AW Football is the brand under which 3AW broadcasts Australian rules football and the station broadcasts football on all AFL match days.

3AW Football dates back to 1953, and legendary commentators such as Norman Banks and Harry Beitzel have spent time calling games at 3AW. Rex Hunt called football at 3AW for 21 years before moving to rival Triple M in 2010.

Matthew Lloyd and Dr Peter Larkins joined 3AW Football in 2012. The team for 2013 also had a number of changes, Stephen Quartermain called on weekends, alongside either Tim Lane or Tony Leonard and the expert commentators. Cameron Ling has an expert commentary role interchangeably on Friday nights, Saturday afternoons and Sunday afternoons.

2014 saw the departure of Stephen Quartermain, and the recruitment of Nathan Brown as a ball-by-ball commentator for Saturday night and Sunday twilight matches.

Current 3AW Football team (2026)
Commentators	Experts	Boundary	Journalists
Anthony Hudson	Leigh Matthews	Jacqui Reed	Caroline Wilson
Bruce Eva	Matthew Lloyd	Abbie McKay	Sam McClure
Matt Granland	Jimmy Bartel	Joel Selwood	Rohan Connelly
Tim Lane	Matthew Richardson	Libby Birch	Eddie Summerfield
Tony Leonard	Tony Shaw	Eddie Summerfield	Laura Spurway
Shane McInnes	Rory Sloane	Spiro Christopoulos (NSW)	
	Libby Birch	Paddy Sweeney (WA)	

=== Former 3AW Football team members ===
(not a complete list)

- Norman Banks [one of the first 3AW commentators] (1953–1960s)
- Harry Beitzel (1972–1989)
- Bill Jacobs
- Ian Johnson [one of the first 3AW commentators]
- Doug Heywood
- Mike Williamson
- Clinton Grybas (2000–2007)
- Rex Hunt (1989–2009 & 2017–2021)
- Dwayne Russell
- Cameron Ling (2012–2019)
- Andrew Bews
- Wayne Carey (2006–2007)
- Tony Charlton [one of the first 3AW commentators]
- Dennis Cometti (2008–2011)
- Scott Cummings
- Gerard Healy
- Craig Hutchison
- David King
- Garry Lyon
- Mick Malthouse (2012)
- Sam Newman (1981–1999)
- Brian Taylor (2010–2014)
- Stephen Quartermain (2013)
- Bill Vickers
- Robert Walls (1995–2012)

== Cricket ==
On 1 November 2013, 3AW's parent company, Fairfax Radio Network (FRN), announced that it had signed a five-year non-exclusive contract commencing with the 2013/2014 Australian cricket season, to broadcast the Boxing Day and Sydney Test matches, all One Day Internationals, the Big Bash League (BBL) and International T20 matches on network stations including 3AW. Subsequently, in December 2013, FRN decided on an earlier start to their coverage by including the Perth test match which commenced on 13 December 2013. Fairfax stated that "Fairfax Radio Network will bring to its coverage more than 60 years' experience of broadcasting sport, assembling a star-studded commentary line up". The coverage will provide a ball-by-ball commentary of all broadcast matches.

The commentary team is anchored by Tim Lane and Bruce Eva, together with a panel consisting of the following experts

- Ian Chappell
- Allan Border
- Dean Jones
- Damien Fleming
- Michael Vaughan
- Henry Blofeld
- Greg Matthews
- Greg Blewett
- Mickey Arthur
- Darren Lehmann
- Glenn McGrath
- John Emburey

== Horse Racing ==
During his years at 3AW, 1933–1954, Fred Tupper (see above) provided sporting coverage, particularly horse racing.

== Station ratings and market position ==
In the sixth ratings survey for 2014, released 30 September 2014, 3AW came first with a 13.8% market share followed by ABC Radio Melbourne with 11.4% and Fox FM with 8.2%. In this survey 3AW won every timeslot.

In the fifth ratings survey for 2014, released 26 August 2014, 3AW came first with a 14% market share followed by ABC Radio Melbourne with 12% and Fox FM with 8.0%.

In the fourth survey, 3AW lost its No. 1 station rating, scoring a 13.0% market share against ABC Radio Melbourne's 13.4% share with Gold 104.3 FM third on 7.4%.

In the first survey for 2014, released on 11 March 2014, 3AW was the No. 1 station scoring an 11.9% market share followed by ABC Radio Melbourne's 10.6% share with Fox FM third on 8.5%. This survey was also the first for new ratings supplier GfK Group, the company that has taken over the running of surveys from Nielsen ratings which produced the surveys for 66 years.

The final ratings survey for 2013 and the last to be conducted by Nielsen, saw 3AW complete five years as Melbourne's number one radio station with 40 consecutive survey wins.

== Controversies ==
Mary Hardy and Geoff Manion presented the afternoon program in the 1960s. Brian McFarlane's biography of Mary Hardy notes that she committed suicide in January 1985 by shooting herself.

In 1999, presenter Bruce Mansfield was sacked after it emerged that he had received benefits in exchange for giving favourable comments and interviews to companies on-air without proper prior disclosure. He returned to the station as its night-time presenter in 2001.

Former presenter Steve Price was tricked into accepting fake ecstasy tablets pressed with "3AW" from comedian John Safran as part of Safran's television show.

John Blackman died on 4 June 2024 after a very high profile and often contentious T.V. and radio career. On T.V. he was particularly known for his work on Hey Hey It's Saturday. However, he also had a prominent and controversial radio career, including work at 3AW. From 1981, he presented the top rating breakfast program with Paul Barber. However, Blackman was forced to leave AW under questionable circumstances on 30 April 1986.

== See also ==
- 3AW Breakfast
- Rumour File
- Radio Times
- List of radio stations in Australia

== Publication ==
Campion, Margaret, 3AW is Melbourne. 75 Years of Radio, Prime Advertising Marketing Publishing, 1987.
