= Digital radio in Australia =

Digital broadcast radio in Australia uses the DAB+ standard and is available in Sydney, Melbourne, Brisbane, Perth, Adelaide, Canberra, Darwin and Hobart. However, after 11 years, regional large cities such as Townsville and Ballarat still do not have DAB. The national government owned television/radio networks, the ABC and SBS, and the commercial radio stations in each market provide many of their services and a few digital-only services on the digital platform. All but a few DAB+ services use the AAC+ codec, with a limited number using standard AAC.

== History ==
Despite testing in Sydney and Melbourne from as early as 1999, the first genuine plan for digital broadcast radio was released in October 2005, as Helen Coonan, the then Australian Minister for Communications, Information Technology and the Arts, announced that Australia would adopt the Eureka 147 system. The Australian Government had set a launch date for digital broadcast radio in the six state capital cities, originally 1 January 2009, but this launch date was subsequently shifted back to no later than 1 July 2009 and the list of cities starting digital broadcast radio excluded Hobart. The peak industry body, Commercial Radio Australia, began coordinating the tests as well as organising the commercial multiplexes. The Australian Film Television and Radio School supported the development of digital radio by holding training seminars and test broadcasts in various cities, organised by then Head of Radio Steve Ahern.

The major radio networks commenced a staged roll-out of commercial DAB+ services during May 2009, with Perth launching on 4 May 2009; Melbourne on 11 May 2009; Adelaide on 20 May 2009; Brisbane on 25 May 2009; and Sydney on 30 May 2009 (later delayed to 15 June due to weather conditions and kept on low power until 30 June). The roll-out of DAB+ services by the Government-owned ABC and SBS networks was delayed until 1 July 2009 due to funding delays and management issues. Testing has been planned for other major cities, with a trial multiplex in Canberra commencing broadcasting on 14 July 2010, and a trial multiplex running in Darwin since 13 August 2010. Similar trials are being considered for Townsville and Hobart, and, as of December 2010, commercial broadcasters in regional markets have begun planning to introduce digital broadcast radio into regional population centres, possibly as soon as 2011 or 2012. However, it is expected that it will be some years before digital broadcast radio is extended to the bulk of the Australian continent. Australia's vast distances and low population density are not well suited to the propagation characteristics of DAB+ and it is therefore likely that a standard other than DAB+ will be adopted for serving areas outside the major cities (leading to customer acceptance issues with receivers that can only receive one of the likely two standards).

Community digital broadcast radio services were rolled out to capital cities in late 2010 to May 2011 and were formally launched in May 2011. The roll out of community digital broadcast radio services represents the largest ever infrastructure project conducted by the community broadcasting sector in Australia. The project was managed by the Community Broadcasting Association of Australia.

On 14 December 2017, the ABC and SBS services in Canberra moved to a separate multiplex (both on 9C, 206.352 MHz) providing the same services as in Adelaide, Brisbane, Melbourne, Perth and Sydney. Services in Hobart began in 2019, as a national multiplex for ABC and SBS stations launched on 19 March 2018 and commercial multiplex launched on 3 April 2019.

On 23 December 2019, two commercial stations in Mandurah launched its digital service on a new multiplex 8C (199.360 MHz), becoming the first market in regional Australia to have DAB services. This was followed by the launch of digital radio in Gold Coast on multiplex 9D (208.064 MHz) on 4 April 2022.

== Current services ==
=== National broadcasters ===
The ABC and SBS operate digital broadcast radio services in all current DAB+ broadcasting markets on frequency block 9C (206.352 MHz). While most services are national, the ABC provides local ABC Local Radio stations for their respective locations.

The local radio services are mostly a simulcast of their AM radio equivalents (FM in the case of Darwin); however, alternate programming is aired pre-empting most sports coverage (which is moved to digital-only station ABC Sport). This programming is also on the ABC's online streams, where sporting rights may prevent international coverage. The ABC also has a number of digital-only radio stations including ABC Jazz, Double J, ABC Country, triple j Unearthed, and ABC Kids listen.

Because the Australian Government chose to give the number of DAB channels (and hence revenue) priority over technical and quality factors, the bitrates available per channel are very low by international standards. The audio quality of Australian DAB is correspondingly low and most channels have much lower bitrates than this. So DAB is in general well below the 128 kbps traditionally accepted as CD quality, and an interference-free FM broadcast will almost certainly provide better audio.

9C National Multiplex
Station name	Format	Details	Owner	Service ID	Bitrate
ABC Classic	Classical music	FM Simulcast	ABC	0x3007	120kbit/s
ABC Country	Country music	DAB+, DTV, Online	ABC	0x3003	72kbit/s
ABC Sport	Live sports coverage	Digital Only	ABC	0x3008	40kbit/s
ABC Jazz	Jazz music	DAB+, DTV, Online	ABC	0x3002	88kbit/s
ABC Kids Listen	Children's radio	Digital Only, Online	ABC	0x3004	64kbit/s
ABC Local Radio	Talk, news, music and more.	Labelled as the name of the local station, e.g., ABC Radio Sydney or ABC Radio Adelaide	ABC	0x3005	64kbit/s
ABC NEWS	News and parliamentary broadcasts	AM Simulcast	ABC	0x3000	40kbit/s
ABC Radio National	National talk and arts radio	AM Simulcast	ABC	0x3006	64kbit/s
Double J	Adult contemporary music station	DAB+, DTV, Online	ABC	0x3001	72kbit/s
Triple J	Youth-focused music station	FM Simulcast	ABC	0x3009	72kbit/s
Triple J Unearthed	Australian independent music station	Digital Only	ABC	0x300A	72kbit/s
SBS Arabic	News and information in Arabic	Digital Only	SBS	0x3804	48kbit/s
SBS Chill	World chillout music	Digital Only	SBS	0x3802	72kbit/s
SBS PopAsia	Asian pop music	Digital Only	SBS	0x3803	72kbit/s
SBS South Asian	South Asian pop music	Digital Only	SBS	0x3805	64kbit/s
SBS Radio 1	Multilingual radio	SBS AM Service (Sydney, Melbourne, Canberra), AM 1485 (Wollongong), DAB+, DTV	SBS	0x3800	40kbit/s
SBS Radio 2	Multilingual radio	SBS FM Service (Sydney, Melbourne, Canberra), AM 1035 (Wollongong), DAB+, DTV	SBS	0x3801	40kbit/s
SBS Radio 3	BBC World Service simulcast	DAB+, DTV	SBS	0x3806	48kbit/s

=== Commercial and community radio ===
Each region with access to digital broadcast radio has a number of multiplexes set aside for commercial and community radio services. In these multiplexes, two-ninths of the bandwidth are reserved for community broadcasters, while the rest is used for commercial broadcasters. Sydney, Melbourne and Brisbane have been provided with two such multiplexes, which broadcast on frequency blocks 9A (202.928 MHz) and 9B (204.640 MHz), allowing a greater number of stations, while other cities only use a single multiplex: 8C (199.360 MHz) in Mandurah, 8D (201.072 MHz) in Canberra, 9A (202.928 MHz) in Darwin and Hobart, 9B (204.640 MHz) in Adelaide and Perth, and 9D (208.064 MHz) in Gold Coast.

Commercial services on digital broadcast radio include simulcasts of both AM and FM stations, as well as new digital-only services. While most commercial radio services in Australia are provided by a small number of companies, there are no truly national commercial stations. However, since these commercial broadcasters have been given extra bandwidth on the digital platform, digital-only stations launched, including Triple M Classic Rock (Southern Cross Austereo) The Edge Digital (ARN) and NovaNation (formerly DMG),

Community Radio stations with a citywide licence have reserved spectrum, equalling 2/9s of the capacity on each commercial multiplex. The Federal Government promised $10.1 million in funding to help community broadcasters with the costs of beginning digital broadcasts. During late 2010 and early 2011 most of the eligible community stations in Melbourne and several in Sydney and Brisbane began test transmissions. Melbourne's community radio stations officially launched their digital services on 14 April 2011, followed by Adelaide's community radio stations on 15 April 2011, Brisbane's on 14 May 2011, and Sydney's on 24 May 2011. Services in Perth are broadcasting in digital. Community Digital Broadcast Radio services were formally launched by Senator Stephen Conroy, Minister for Broadband, Communications and the Digital Economy on 13 May 2011 in Melbourne.

==== Adelaide ====
Listing current at 2 October 2026

9B Adelaide Multiplex
Station name	Format	Details	Owner	Service ID	Bitrate
GOLD 1323	Classic Hits	Simulcast of 1323 AM	ARN	0x1062	48kbit/s
KIIS 102.3	Top 40 / Classic hits radio	Simulcast of 102.3 FM	ARN	0x1061	48kbit/s
GOLD 80s	'80s music	Digital only	ARN	0x1060	32kbit/s
KIIS 90s	'90s music	Digital only	ARN	0x1064	32kbit/s
Chemist Warehouse Remix	Classic hits / Hot adult contemporary	Digital only	ARN	0x106A	32kbit/s
Gold Adelaide	Adult contemporary, like Mix 102.3's format before rebranding	Digital only	ARN	0x1063	32kbit/s
TikTok Trending	Music popular on TikTok	Digital only	ARN	0x1065	32kbit/s
iHeartCountry	Country Music	Digital only	ARN	0x1066	32kbit/s
FIVEaa	Talk radio	Simulcast of 1395 AM	Nova	0x1089	64kbit/s
Nova 91.9	Top 40 / Classic hits radio	Simulcast of 91.9 FM	Nova	0x1088	64kbit/s
Coles Radio	Pop music	Digital and Coles stores	Nova	0x108B	40kbit/s
Nova All Stars	Artist Marathons	Digital only	Nova	0x108D	24kbit/s
Nova Jamz	RnB and Urban	Digital only	Nova	0x108E	40kbit/s
Smoothfm	Soft Adult Contemporary / Middle of the Road	Digital only	Nova	0x108A	40kbit/s
Smooth 80's	'80s music	Digital only	Nova	0x108C	40kbit/s
Triple M	Active rock	Simulcast of 104.7 FM	Southern Cross Austereo	0x1075	32kbit/s
SAFM	Top 40 / Classic hits radio	Simulcast of 107.1 FM	Southern Cross Austereo	0x1074	32kbit/s
Blender Beats	Remixes	Digital only	Southern Cross Austereo	0x1079	32kbit/s
MMM 90's	90's Rock music	Digital only	Southern Cross Austereo	0x1078	32kbit/s
MMM 2000's	Noughties Rock music	Digital only	Southern Cross Austereo	0x1080	32kbit/s
MMM Classic Rock	Classic rock	Digital only		0x107B	32kbit/s
Oldskool 80's Hits	'80s music	Digital only	Southern Cross Austereo	0x1076	32kbit/s
Oldskool 90's Hits	'90s music	Digital only	Southern Cross Austereo	0x107D	32kbit/s
RnB Fridays	RnB and Urban	Digital only	Southern Cross Austereo	0x107E	32kbit/s
Dance Hits	Dance	Digital only	Southern Cross Austereo	0x107F	32kbit/s
Heart	Adult contemporary	Digital only	Southern Cross Austereo	0x1077	32kbit/s
Heart Hits	Classic Hits	Digital only	Southern Cross Austereo	0x107A	32kbit/s
IRIS	Radio reading service	Digital only	Community	0x10AC	32kbit/s
RPH Adelaide	Radio reading service	Simulcast of 1197 AM	Community	0x10A7	32kbit/s
EBI Digital World	Multicultural	Simulcast of 103.1 FM	Community	0x10AB	64kbit/s
Fresh Digital	Dance music	Simulcast of 92.7 FM	Community	0x10A8	64kbit/s
Three D Radio	Progressive	Simulcast of 93.7 FM	Community	0x10AA	64kbit/s
Radio Adelaide	Varied	Simulcast of 101.5 FM	Community	0x10A6	64kbit/s
1079 Life	Adult contemporary / Christian	Simulcast of 107.9 FM	Community	0x10A9	64kbit/s

==== Brisbane ====
9A Brisbane Multiplex
Station name	Format	Details	Owner	Service ID	Bitrate
Nova 106.9	Top 40 / Classic hits radio	Simulcast of 106.9 FM	Nova	0x1254	48kbit/s
Coles Radio	Pop music	Digital and Coles stores	Nova	0x1055	32kbit/s
The Rock	Active Rock	Digital only	MediaWorks		32kbit/s
Smooth FM	Chill-out music	Digital only	Nova	0x1257	48kbit/s
Coles TAS	Pop music	Digital and Coles stores (TAS)	Nova	0x1258	16kbit/s
Coles CBD	Pop music	Digital and Coles stores (CBD)	Nova	0x1259	16kbit/s
News24 Radio	News	Digital Only	Nova Entertainment (partnership with Australian News Channel)	0x125a	32kbit/s
Nova Throwbacks	Adult Contemporary	Digital Only	Nova	0x125b	32kbit/s
Radio TAB	Horse racing, sport	Simulcast of 1008 AM	Tabcorp	0x125e	40kbit/s
4TAB 2	Horse racing, sport	Digital only	Tabcorp	0x125f	40kbit/s
NICHE 1 / Italian	Multicultural - Mono version	Digital only		0x1260	24kbit/s
4TAB 4	Horse racing, sport	Digital only	Tabcorp	0x1261	24kbit/s
KIIS 97.3 Brisbane	Hot adult contemporary	Simulcast of 97.3 FM	ARN/Nova joint venture	0x1268	32kbit/s
CADA	Hip hop, R&B / Rhythmic contemporary	Digital only	ARN	0x126a	32kbit/s
KIIS 90s	'90s Music	Digital only	ARN	0x126b	32kbit/s
Chemist Warehouse Remix	Classic hits / Hot adult contemporary	Digital only and Chemist Warehouse Stores	ARN	0x126c	32kbit/s
Gold 80s	'80s Music	Digital only	ARN	0x126d	32kbit/s
TikTok Trending	Pop music	Digital only	ARN	0x106e	32kbit/s
iHeartCountry	Country	Digital only	ARN	0x126f	32kbit/s
GOLD Brisbane	Adult contemporary	Digital Only	ARN		32kbit/s
Elf Radio	Christmas music	Digital only, during Christmas season	ARN	0x1070	32kbit/s
Vision Christian Radio	Christian	Simulcast of multiple frequencies	Vision Christian Radio	0x1272	64kbit/s
SEN FANATIC		Digital only		0x1273	32kbit/s
NICHE 1 / Italian	Multicultural - Stereo version	Digital only		0x1274	24kbit/s
NICHE 2 / Multicultural	Multicultural	Digital only		0x1275	24kbit/s
MMM 80s	Rock (80s)	Digital only	Southern Cross Austereo	0x12a5	32kbit/s
MMM Classic Rock	Classic Rock	Digital only	Southern Cross Austereo	0x12a6	32kbit/s
Heart Hits	Easy Listening Hits	Digital Only	Southern Cross Austereo	0x12a7	32kbit/s
90s SOFT POP	Soft Pop	Digital Only		0x12a8	32kbit/s
Global (4EB)	Ethnic programming and world music	Digital only	Community	0x12cc	48kbit/s
96.5 Inspire DAB	Christian	Digital only, related to 96five Family FM	Community	0x12cd	48kbit/s
Reading Radio	Reading Service	Simulcast of 1296 AM	Community	0x12cf	48kbit/s
Christmas Hope	Christmas Music	Digital Only		0x12d0	48kbit/s

9B Brisbane Multiplex
Station name	Format	Details	Owner	Service ID	Bitrate
B105	Top 40 / Classic hits radio	Simulcast of 105.3 FM	Southern Cross Austereo	0x1240	32kbit/s
Triple M	Active rock	Simulcast of 104.5 FM	Southern Cross Austereo	0x1246	32kbit/s
Triple M Country	Country rock	Digital only	Southern Cross Austereo	0x1241	32kbit/s
MMM 90s	Rock (90s)	Digital only	Southern Cross Austereo	0x1241	32kbit/s
OLDSKOOL 80s	Old-school 80s music	Digital only	Southern Cross Austereo	0x1248	32kbit/s
OLDSKOOL 90s	Old-school 90s music	Digital only	Southern Cross Austereo	0x1244	32kbit/s
RnB Fridays	RnB music	Digital only	Southern Cross Austereo	0x124c	32kbit/s
MMM 2000s	Rock (2000s)	Digital only	Southern Cross Austereo		32kbit/s
Dance Hits	Dance music	Digital only	Southern Cross Austereo		32kbit/s
BLENDER BEATS	Remixes and Mashups music	Digital only	Southern Cross Austereo		32kbit/s
Heart	Adult contemporary	Digital only	Southern Cross Austereo		32kbit/s
Pop UK	Top 40	Digital only	Southern Cross Austereo		32kbit/s
4BC	Talk radio	Simulcast of 882 AM	Tapt Media	0x127c	48kbit/s
4BH	Music	Simulcast of 1116 AM	Tapt Media	0x127d	96kbit/s
NTS	Talk	Digital only	Tapt Media		48kbit/s
SENQ 693	Sports / talk	Simulcast of 693 AM	Sports Entertainment Network		32kbit/s
SEN Track 1053	Racing	Simulcast of 1053 AM	Sports Entertainment Network		32kbit/s
SEN MEL	Sports	Digital only	Sports Entertainment Network		32kbit/s
Bunnings Tradio	Modern Rock	Digital only	Sports Entertainment Network		32kbit/s
Zed Digital	Independent music	Digital only, related to 4ZZZ	Community	0x12e0	48kbit/s
Switch 1197	Various	Simulcast of 1197 AM	Community	0x12e1	48kbit/s
4MBS Light	Classical music	Digital only	Community	0x12e2	64kbit/s
4ZZZ	Independent music	Simulcast of 102.1 FM	Community	0x12e3	48kbit/s
Rise 96.5 FM	Christian	Simulcast of 96.5 FM	Community	0x12c4	48kbit/s

==== Canberra ====
8D Canberra Multiplex
Station name	Format	Details	Owner
2CA	Classic hits	Simulcast of 1053 AM	Capital Radio Network/Grant Broadcasters joint venture
2CC	Talk radio	Simulcast of 1206 AM	Capital Radio Network/Grant Broadcasters joint venture
Hit 104.7	Contemporary hit radio / Top 40	Simulcast of 104.7 FM	Canberra FM Radio ARN/Southern Cross Austereo joint venture
Mix 106.3	Hot adult contemporary	Simulcast of 106.3 FM	Canberra FM Radio ARN/Southern Cross Austereo joint venture
Kix Country	Country music	Digital only	Grant Broadcasters
My Canberra Digital	Hot Adult Contemporary	Digital only	Capital Radio Network
Hit Buddha	Chill-out music	Digital only	Southern Cross Austereo
Snow Digital	Contemporary hit radio	Simulcast of Snow FM in the Snowy Mountains with Canberra advertising.	Capital Radio Network
The Edge Digital	Contemporary hit radio	Simulcast of 96.1 FM Western Sydney digital-only in Canberra	ARN
Coles Radio	Classic hits / Adult contemporary	Digital only	Nova Entertainment via leased space from Capital Radio Network
Club Lime	High energy gym music	Digital only	Canberra FM Radio ARN/Southern Cross Austereo / Viva Leisure joint venture
NIGE!	Rock music	Digital only	Canberra FM Radio ARN/Southern Cross Austereo joint venture

==== Darwin ====
9A Darwin Multiplex
Station name	Format	Details	Owner
Hot 100 FM	Top 40 / Classic hits radio	Simulcast of 100.1 FM	Grant Broadcasters
Mix 104.9	Hot adult contemporary	Simulcast of 104.9 FM	Grant Broadcasters
Kix Country Digital	Country music	Digital only version of KIX Country	Grant Broadcasters
Radio TAB	Horse racing, sport	Simulcast of 1242 AM*	UNITAB
Classic Rock Digital	Rock music	Digital only	Grant Broadcasters
Note: KIX Country and Radio TAB broadcast on limited licences, and as a result are treated as digital only stations.

==== Gold Coast ====
9D Gold Coast Multiplex
Station name	Format	Details	Owner
90.9 Sea FM	Top 40 CHR	Simulcast of 90.9 FM	Southern Cross Austereo
Easy 80s Hits	Easy listening	Digital only	Southern Cross Austereo
OLDSKOOL 90s Hits	Old-school hits	Digital only	Southern Cross Austereo
RnB Fridays	Urban Music	Digital only	Southern Cross Austereo
Triple M Gold Coast	Mainstrean Rock	Simulcast of 92.5 FM	Southern Cross Austereo
Triple M Classic Rock	Classic rock	Digital only	Southern Cross Austereo
Triple M 80s	80s Rock Music	Digital only	Southern Cross Austereo
Triple M 90s	90s Rock Music	Digital only	Southern Cross Austereo
Hot Tomato	Adult Contemporary	Simulcast of 102.9 FM	ARN
Hot Tomato Gold	Classic Hits	Digital Only	ARN
Hot Tomato Ripe	CHR	Digital Only	ARN
CADA	Rhythmic CHR; Urban contemporary	Digital Only	ARN

==== Hobart ====
9A Hobart Multiplex
Station name	Format	Details	Owner	Service ID	Bitrate
7HOFM	Adult contemporary	Simulcast of 101.7 FM	Grant Broadcasters	0x1380	48kbit/s
Hit 100.9	Top 40 (CHR)	Simulcast of 100.9 FM	Southern Cross Austereo	0x1391	48kbit/s
Triple M Hobart	Adult contemporary	Simulcast of 107.3 FM	Southern Cross Austereo	0x1390	48kbit/s
Hit Easy	Easy listening	Digital only	Southern Cross Austereo	0x1397	40kbit/s
Hit Oldskool	Classic hits / Hot adult contemporary	Digital only	Southern Cross Austereo	0x1396	40kbit/s
MMM Classic Rock	Rock	Digital only	Southern Cross Austereo	0x1393	40kbit/s
MMM Country	Country	Digital only	Southern Cross Austereo	0x1398	40kbit/s
7HO Classic Hits	Adult contemporary	Digital Only	Grant Broadcasters	0x1382	40kbit/s
KIX Country	Country	Digital only	Grant Broadcasters	0x1381	40kbit/s
7RPH Print Radio	Radio reading service	Simulcast of 864 AM	Community	0x13B0	64kbit/s
Hobart FM	Community	Simulcast of 96.1 and 92.1 FM	Community	0x13B3	64kbit/s
Ultra 106.5	Christian	Simulcast of 106.5 FM	Community	0x13B1	64kbit/s

==== Mandurah ====
8C Mandurah Multiplex
Station name	Format	Details	Owner	Service ID	Bitrate
97.3 Coast FM	Top 40 CHR	Simulcast of 97.3 FM	West Coast Radio	62C1	96kbit/s
91.7 The Wave	Classic Hits / Contemporary	Simulcast of 91.7 FM	West Coast Radio	62C2	96kbit/s
KIX Country South West	Country		West Coast Radio	62C3	64kbit/s
SEN Peel	Sport		Sports Entertainment Network (SEN)	62C4	32kbit/s

==== Melbourne ====
Listing current as of 3 September 2026

9A Melbourne Multiplex
Station name	Format	Details	Network	Bitrate
KIIS Australia	Australian music	Digital only	ARN	32kbit/s
KIIS Dance	Dance music	Digital only	ARN	32kbit/s
The Rock	Active Rock	Digital only	MediaWorks	32kbit/s
Smooth 91.5	Easy listening	Simulcast of 91.5 FM	Nova Entertainment	64kbit/s
Nova 100	Top 40 CHR	Simulcast of 100.3 FM	Nova Entertainment	64kbit/s
News24 Radio	News and Current Affairs	Digital only	Nova Entertainment (partnership with Australian News Channel)	32kbit/s
Smooth Relax	Easy listening	Digital only	Nova Entertainment	40kbit/s
Smooth Vintage	Classic Hits	Digital only	Nova Entertainment	40kbit/s
Coles Radio	Classic Hits / Adult contemporary	Digital only	Nova Entertainment (commercial partnership with Coles Supermarkets)	40kbit/s
Radio Maria	Religious	Digital only	Nova Entertainment (leased by Radio Maria)	48kbit/s
RSN Racing & Sport	Racing	Simulcast of 927 AM	Racing Victoria	64kbit/s
RSN Xtra 1	Racing / Victorian Amateur Football Association (VAFA)	Digital only	Racing Victoria	48kbit/s
Triple M Classic Rock	Classic rock	Digital only	Southern Cross Austereo	32kbit/s
Triple M Country	Country music	Digital only	Southern Cross Austereo	40kbit/s
Triple M 2000s	2000s Rock Music	Digital only	Southern Cross Austereo	32kbit/s
Triple M 80s	80s Rock Music	Digital only	Southern Cross Austereo	32kbit/s
1116 SEN	Sports / talk	Simulcast of 1116 AM	Sports Entertainment Network	40kbit/s
SEN Fanatic	Sports	Digital only	Sports Entertainment Network	32kbit/s
SEN Track	Racing	Digital only	Sports Entertainment Network	40kbit/s
Bunnings Tradio	Modern Rock	Digital only	Sports Entertainment Network	40kbit/s
Rete Italia / Niche Radio	Italian-language	Digital only, formerly simulcast of 1593 AM	Sports Entertainment Network (leased by Rete Italia)	40kbit/s
Easy Music 3MP	Easy listening	Simulcast of 1377 AM	Tapt Media (leased by Ace Radio)	64kbit/s
VA IRIS	Radio reading service	Digital only	Vision Christian Radio	32kbit/s
Vision Christian Radio	Christian	Simulcast of multiple frequencies	Vision Christian Radio	64kbit/s
3MBS	Classical music	Simulcast of 103.5 FM	Community	64kbit/s
3RRR Digital	Varied	Simulcast of 102.7 FM	Community	64kbit/s
3ZZZ	Ethnic	Simulcast of 92.3 FM	Community	64kbit/s
3XY Radio Hellas	Greek-language	Simulcast of 1422 AM	Community	16kbit/s
89.9 TheLight	Christian contemporary	Simulcast of 89.9 FM	Community	32kbit/s
Light Mix	Christian contemporary	Digital only, related to 89.9 TheLight	Community	32kbit/s
Light Worship	Christian contemporary	Digital only, related to 89.9 TheLight	Community	32kbit/s
Light Christmas	Christian contemporary	Digital only, during Christmas season, related to 89.9 TheLight	Community	48kbit/s

9B Melbourne Multiplex
Station name	Format	Details	Network	Bitrate
GOLD 104.3	Adult Contemporary	Simulcast of 104.3 FM	ARN	48kbit/s
KIIS 101.1	Top 40 CHR	Simulcast of 101.1 FM	ARN	48kbit/s
GOLD 80s	80s music	Digital only	ARN	32kbit/s
KIIS 90s	90s music	Digital only	ARN	32kbit/s
iHeart Country	Country Music	Digital only	ARN	32kbit/s
CADA	Rhythmic contemporary	Digital only	ARN	32kbit/s
Elf Radio	Christmas music	Digital only, during Christmas season	ARN	32kbit/s
CW Remix	Classic hits / Hot adult contemporary	Digital only	ARN (commercial partnership with Chemist Warehouse)	32kbit/s
TikTok Trending	Hot adult contemporary	Digital only	ARN	32kbit/s
Nova Nation	Dance Music	Digital only	Nova Entertainment	32kbit/s
Priceline Radio	Hot Adult Contemporary	Digital only	Nova Entertainment	32kbit/s
Fox FM 101.9	Hot adult contemporary	Simulcast of 101.9 FM	Southern Cross Austereo	40kbit/s
Triple M	Active rock	Simulcast of 105.1 FM	Southern Cross Austereo	40kbit/s
Heart	Adult contemporary	Digital only	Southern Cross Austereo	32kbit/s
Heart Hits	Hit Adult contemporary	Digital only	Southern Cross Austereo	32kbit/s
OLDSKOOL 80s	Old-school 80s music	Digital only	Southern Cross Austereo	32kbit/s
OLDSKOOL 90s	Old-school 90s music	Digital only	Southern Cross Austereo	32kbit/s
BLENDER BEATS	Remixes and Mashups music	Digital only	Southern Cross Austereo	40kbit/s
Dance Hits	Dance music	Digital only	Southern Cross Austereo	40kbit/s
RnB Fridays	RnB music	Digital only	Southern Cross Austereo	40kbit/s
Triple M 90s	90s Rock Music	Digital only	Southern Cross Austereo	32kbit/s
SANTA	Christmas Music	Digital only, during Christmas season	Southern Cross Austereo	32kbit/s
SoundCloud Radio	New music discovery	Digital only	Southern Cross Austereo (partnership with SoundCloud)	32kbit/s
3AW	Talk Radio	Simulcast of 693 AM	Tapt Media	96kbit/s
Magic	Oldies / Classic Hits	Simulcast of 1278 AM	Tapt Media (leased by Ace Radio)	96kbit/s
NTS	Talk	Digital only	Tapt Media	48kbit/s
VAR Digital	Reading Radio	Digital only	Vision Christian Radio	32kbit/s
3CR	Varied	Simulcast of 855 AM	Community	64kbit/s
3KND Kool N Deadly	Indigenous	Simulcast of 1503 AM	Community	48kbit/s
PBS Digital	Varied	Simulcast of 106.7 FM	Community	64kbit/s
SYN	Youth / Student	Simulcast of 90.7 FM	Community	64kbit/s
Joy	LGBT-based / Hot adult contemporary	Simulcast of 94.9 FM	Community (Sub-metro licence assigned to spare community spectrum)	48kbit/s

==== Perth (Can also use selected Mandurah stations) ====
9B Perth Multiplex
Station name	Format	Details	Owner	Service ID	Bitrate
6PR	Talk	Simulcast of 882 AM	Tapt Media		
Gold 96FM	Adult Contemporary	Simulcast of 96.1 FM	ARN Media		
6IX	Classic hits	Simulcast of 1080 AM	Capital Radio Network/Grant Broadcasters joint venture		
My Perth Digital	Hot adult contemporary	Digital only	Capital Radio Network		
KIX Country Digital	Country music	Digital only	Grant Broadcasters		
Nova 93.7	Top 40 / Classic hits radio	Simulcast of 93.7 FM	Nova		
Smoothfm	Easy listening	Digital only	Nova		
Triple M	Mainstream rock	Simulcast of 92.9 FM	Southern Cross Austereo		
X Digital	Top 40 / Classic hits radio	Digital only	Capital Radio Network		
Magic	Music	Digital only	Tapt Media		
Mix 94.5	Top 40 / Classic hits radio	Simulcast of 94.5 FM	Southern Cross Austereo		
Buddha Radio	Chill-out music	Digital only	Southern Cross Austereo		
Triple M Classic Rock	Classic rock	Digital only	Southern Cross Austereo		
990 6RPH Information Radio	Information	Simulcast of 990 AM	Community		
RTRFM	Public radio / Music and arts community	Simulcast of 92.1 FM	Community		
6EBA	Ethnic radio	Simulcast of 95.7 FM	Community		
Inspire Digital	Christian music	Digital only—related to Hope 103.2 FM	Community		
Sonshine	Christian Music	Simulcast of 98.5FM Perth and 97.3FM Katanning	Good News Broadcasters Inc		
Sonshine Extra	Christian Music	Digital Only	Good News Broadcasters Inc		
Curtin FM	University community radio / Music, talk, news	Simulcast of 100.1 FM	Community		
Noongar Radio 100.9	Indigenous	Simulcast of 100.9 FM	Community		
Capital 101.7FM	Seniors community	Simulcast of 101.7 FM	Community		
Elf Radio	Christmas music	Digital only, during Christmas season	ARN Media	0x1065	32kbit/s

==== Sydney ====
Listing current at 12 November 2026

9A Sydney Multiplex
Station name	Format	Details	Network	Service ID	Bitrate	Forward Error Correction (FEC)
2SM Talk / Sport	Talk	Simulcast of 1269 AM	Broadcast Operations Group	0x1194	64kbit/s	3A
GorillaDanceHits	Dance music	Digital only	Broadcast Operations Group	0x1195	48kbit/s	4A
ZOO MusicVariety	Hot adult contemporary: 1990s / Top 40 / Classic hits radio	Digital only	Broadcast Operations Group	0x1196	48kbit/s	4A
Dance Super Digi	Dance music	Digital only	Broadcast Operations Group	0x1197	48kbit/s	4A
FUN Classic Hits	Hot adult contemporary: 1960s-1980s	Digital only	Broadcast Operations Group	0x1198	48kbit/s	4A
2DayFM	Adult contemporary radio	Simulcast of 104.1 FM	Southern Cross Austereo	0x119E	32kbit/s	3A
Triple M	Active rock	Simulcast of 104.9 FM	Southern Cross Austereo	0x119F	32kbit/s	3A
Triple M Classic Rock	Classic rock	Digital only	Southern Cross Austereo	0x11A0	40kbit/s	3A
Triple M 90s	90s Rock Music	Digital only	Southern Cross Austereo	0x11A1	40kbit/s	3A
OLDSKOOL 80s	80s music	Digital only	Southern Cross Austereo	0x11A2	40kbit/s	3A
Heart	Adult contemporary	Digital only	Southern Cross Austereo		40kbit/s	3A
Triple M 80s	80's rock	Digital only	Southern Cross Austereo	0x11A0	40kbit/s	3A
OLDSKOOL 90s	Old-school hits	Digital only	Southern Cross Austereo	0x11A5	40kbit/s	3A
RnB Fridays Radio	Urban Music	Digital only	Southern Cross Austereo		32kbit/s	3A
BLENDER BEATS	Urban Music	Digital only	Southern Cross Austereo		32kbit/s	3A
Triple M 2000s	2000s Rock Music	Digital only	Southern Cross Austereo		40kbit/s	3A
DANCE HITS	Dance music	Digital only	Southern Cross Austereo		32kbit/s	3A
INDIE + ALT	Indie and Alternative Rock music	Digital only	Southern Cross Austereo		32kbit/s	3A
80s New Wave	80s New wave music	Digital only	Southern Cross Austereo		32kbit/s	3A
SEN Melbourne	Sports/talk	Simulcast of 1116 SEN Melbourne	Sports Entertainment Network		32kbit/s	4A
Vision Christian Radio	Christian	Simulcast of multiple frequencies	Vision Christian Radio	0x00001272	64kbit/s	9A
Bunnings Tradio	Modern Rock	Digital only	Sports Entertainment Network		32kbit/s	9A
1170 SEN	Sports/talk	Simulcast of 1170 AM	Sports Entertainment Network		40kbit/s	3A
Rete Italia / Niche Radio	Italian-language	Digital only	Sky (lease by Rete Italia through agreement with SEN)	0x11E5	32kbit/s	3A
Sky Sports Radio	Racing / sport	Simulcast of 1017 AM	Sky	0x11E4	64kbit/s	3A
Sky Thoroughbred Central	Racing / sport	Digital only	Sky	0x11E6	32kbit/s	3A
SEN Track	Racing / sport	Simulcast of 1539AM	Sports Entertainment Network		32kbit/s	4A
Niche 1	Italian-language	Digital only	Sky (lease by Rete Italia through agreement with SEN)		16kbit/s	9A
Niche 2	Italian-language	Digital only	Sky (lease by Rete Italia through agreement with SEN)		16kbit/s	9A
Fine Music Sydney	Classical music	Simulcast of 102.5 FM	Community	0x120C	64kbit/s	3A
Koori Radio	Indigenous programming	Simulcast of 93.7 FM	Community	0x120D	48kbit/s	4A
2RPH Digital	Radio Reading	Simulcast of 1224 AM and 101.5 FM	Community	0x120E	48kbit/s	4A
Christmas Hope	Christmas music	Digital only, during Christmas season	Community		48kbit/s	4A
2000 Languages	Ethnic	Simulcast of 98.5 FM	Community	0x121F	64kbit/s	3B

9B Sydney Multiplex
Station name	Format	Details	Network	Service ID	Bitrate	Forward Error Correction (FEC)
GOLD 101.7	Adult Contemporary	Simulcast of 101.7 FM	ARN	0x1180	48kbit/s	3A
KIIS 106.5	Top 40 CHR	Simulcast of 106.5 FM	ARN	0x1181	48kbit/s	3A
CADA	Rhythmic contemporary	Simulcast of 96.1 FM	ARN	0x1182	48kbit/s	3A
KIIS 90s	90s hits	Digital only	ARN	0x1181	48kbit/s	3A
CW Remix	Classic hits radio / Hot adult contemporary	Digital only	ARN (commercial partnership with Chemist Warehouse)	0x1184	32kbit/s	3A
GOLD 80s	'80s Music	Digital only	ARN	0x1185	48kbit/s	3A
TikTok Trending	Hot adult contemporary	Digital only	ARN		32kbit/s	3A
KIIS Australia	Australian music	Digital only	ARN		32kbit/s	
iHeart Country	Country Music	Digital only	ARN		32kbit/s	
ELF Radio	Christmas Music	Digital only, during Christmas season	ARN		32kbit/s	3A
Smooth 95.3	Easy listening	Simulcast of 95.3 FM	Nova Entertainment	0x11BC	64kbit/s	3A
Nova 96.9	Top 40 CHR	Simulcast of 96.9 FM	Nova Entertainment	0x11BD	64kbit/s	3A
Coles Radio	Supermarket radio	Digital only	Nova Entertainment (commercial partnership with Coles Supermarkets)	0x11BE	40kbit/s	3A
Smooth Relax	Easy listening	Digital Only	Nova Entertainment		40kbit/s	3A
Radio Maria	Religious	Digital only	Nova Entertainment (leased by Radio Maria)		48kbit/s	3A
Smooth Vintage	Classic Hits	Digital Only	Nova Entertainment		40kbit/s	3A
Radio Maria Italian	Italian language	Digital only	Nova Entertainment (leased by Radio Maria)		24kbit/s	3A
News24 Radio	News and Current Affairs	Digital only	Nova Entertainment (partnership with Australian News Channel)		32kbit/s	
2GB	Talk	Simulcast of 873 AM	Tapt Media	0x11D0	80kbit/s	2A
2UE	Music	Simulcast of 954 AM	Tapt Media		72kbit/s	2A
News Talk Sport (NTS)	Talk	Digital only	Tapt Media		40kbit/s	2A
Nova Nation	Dance Music	Digital only	Nova Entertainment		32kbit/s	
Priceline Radio	Hot Adult Contemporary	Digital only	Nova Entertainment		32kbit/s	
Triple M Country	Modern country	Digital only	Southern Cross Austereo	0x1208	32kbit/s	3A
Heart Hits	Hit Adult contemporary	Digital only	Southern Cross Austereo		32kbit/s	3A
Inspire Digital	Christian music	Digital only—related to Hope 103.2 FM	Community	0x1220	48kbit/s	3A
2SER 107.3	Varied	Simulcast of 107.3 FM	Community	0x1221	64kbit/s	3A
2MFM Muslim DR	Islamic programming	Simulcast of 92.1 FM	Community	0x1222	48kbit/s	4A
FBi Radio	Independent music	Simulcast of 94.5 FM	Community	0x1223	56kbit/s	3A
Hope 1032	Hot adult contemporary / Easy listening	Simulcast of 103.2 FM	Community	0x1224	48kbit/s	3A
2RPH Plus	Radio Reading	Digital Only	Community		32kbit/s	4A
