= Action Battle Team (radio) =

Maz, Dan and Shane
- Genre: Comedy / Breakfast
- Running time: 180 minutes
- Country of origin: Australia
- Language: English
- Home station: Nova 91.9
- Starring: Maz Compton; Dan Debuf; Shane Lowe; Matt Saraceni (2008-2012)
- Created by: Nova FM
- Produced by: Georgie Clark
- Original release: 2007 – 2012
- Audio format: FM Stereo
- Website: Matt Dan & Maz
- Podcast: Matt Dan & Maz Podcast

Action Battle Team was a radio show broadcast from 6 am to 9 am AEST in Adelaide, Australia on Nova. It was hosted by former MTV presenter Maz Compton, Dan Debuf and Shane Lowe.

The show mainly worked around talkback topics, observational humour and sketches, derived from various media sources.

The Action Battle Team was originally hosted by just Matt and Dan and ran as the Nova 93.7 nights show in 2008-2009. DMG Radio Australia announced on 23 November 2009 that the show would move to the national late night shift for Nova FM in 2010. It was also announced that former MTV presenter Maz Compton would be joining the show.

In December 2010, it was announced that the show would move to Adelaide to present breakfast on Nova 91.9.

In November 2011, Saraceni resigned from Nova 91.9 to move back to Melbourne. It was also announced that Shane Lowe will join the team from 2012.

== History ==
Matt Saraceni and Dan Debuf met in high school at John XXIII College and attended the University of Western Australia together. Both Matt and Dan studied law and wrote comedic plays for the University Dramatic Society. In 2007, the pair moved to Melbourne to continue their studies at the University of Melbourne but got involved in comedy and radio there.

The program began in June 2007 as a mid-dawn program on the Melbourne Nova 100 station, with the cast being Matt Saraceni and Dan Debuf. In November 2007, Matt and Dan filled in for the nights team and hosted a show from 7 pm-10 pm for two weeks. This led to the pair being offered the nights show in Perth for Nova 93.7. The show ran in Perth during 2008 and 2009. "The Action Battle Team" was nominated for the Award for Outstanding Radio Comedy Segment in the 2009 ACRA Awards.

By the end of 2009, former MTV presenter Maz Compton was asked to join the team and leave her former position of hosting the Nova 96.9 nights show with James Kerley. At the start of 2010, the show was broadcasting to Perth, Brisbane, Adelaide, Sydney and Melbourne.

In November 2011, Saraceni resigned from Nova 91.9 to move back to Melbourne. Shane Lowe will join the team from 2012.

== Content ==
=== Celebrity Interviews ===
The team have interviewed the likes of Kanye West, Andrew Stockdale, MGMT, The Prodigy, Florence Welch, Arj Barker and adult entertainer Belladonna.

=== Weekly Recurring Segments (after 8am) ===
- Monday - Listen to your Heart: Shane, Dan and Maz give love advice to callers.
- Tuesday - Dudes Day Tuesday: Shane and Dan talk about men's issues and generally excludes Maz (with exceptions).
- Wednesday - Choose Your Own Adventure: Every Tuesday night the shows host station Nova 919 asks on Facebook what the ring in topic should be for the following morning (Wednesday).
- Thursday - Dob in a Dumba**: Callers ring in and dob in a dumba**.
- Friday - Dan Time: Dan takes over and chooses the topic for the morning, not allowing Matt or Maz input.

=== Old Segments (pre 2011) ===
- Bullshit News: This is a regular Friday segment where Dan tells three news stories, one of which is made-up. The listener who can spot the fake news story wins a prize
- The Answer is B: a multiple choice quiz where the answer is always the second option "B".
- Elevensies: A nightly quiz between two listeners that occurs at 11 pm. Each contestant is required to invent their own buzzer for the game. This segment has changed its name depending what time slot the show is filling in for. Past names have included "'eightsies'" and "'sevensies'". A different take of 'Elevensies' occurred known as 'elephantsies' in which all questions involved elephants.
- Chat Roulette: a segment based on the website 'chatroulette.com'. Here a listener is put on the line with a stream of callers. At any point the listener may say 'next' and the current caller is disconnected and a new caller is immediately connected to them.
- Drunk Dial: One of the few original segments carried over from the mid-dawn Melbourne shift. Listeners who have had too much to drink and have the intention of calling their ex give the Action Battle Team the exes number and they perform a 'drunk dial' on the listeners behalf. This segment usually involves the hosts acting drunk and telling the listeners exes that they "no longer love them".
- Like Song Dedications: a segment that spoofs the late night radio format of "love song dedications", where people dedicate songs to someone they love. In this segment you are not required to "love" someone to get a song on the radio for them, only to "like" them.
- Happy New Day: as each show finishes at midnight, at the end of each show the team performs a "New Year's Eve" style countdown and wishes listeners a "Happy New Day".
- The Meat Speaker: a segment based on Dan's psychic ability to tell the future based on a person's favourite type of meat. This segment satirises other radio psychics.
- The Achievement Club: Listeners call up and say the one thing they have been putting off for ages and promise to do it within the next 24 hours. The next day they are called back to check they have done it and get inducted into the 'achievement club'. Every inductee gets a badge.
- Beat The Tweet: a segment that discusses a Trending Topic on Twitter and invites listeners to contribute to that topic.
- Dinosaur News: a segment where Dan tells a breaking news story about prehistoric creatures that have been extinct for millions of year. Matt and Maz consistently berate Dan for running this segment.
- Doctor Strangelove: a copyright infringing relationship expert that gives listeners generally completely irrelevant advice for love.
