= Tim Blackwell (broadcaster) =

Australian radio broadcaster

- Born: Timothy Blackwell; 10 August 1981 (age 45); Hobart, Tasmania, Australia
- Occupations: Radio broadcaster, voice actor, media personality
- Children: 3

Timothy Blackwell (born 10 August 1981) is an Australian radio broadcaster. Blackwell is currently hosts Ricki-Lee & Tim on Nova 96.9.

Blackwell grew up in Hobart, Australia. He then moved to Washington DC at the age of 13 with his mother and step-father before returning to Hobart in his late teens.

Blackwell had an interim ADVO (apprehended domestic violence order) issued against him on March 10 2026. The action was brought against him by NSW Police on behalf of his ex wife. It was reported that the Daily Telegraph stated that this was withdrawn in June 2026

== Career ==
Blackwell's first job in radio at Nova was in 2001, where he joined Nova 100 in Melbourne as late night announcer. In 2002 he moved to Perth to host Nova 93.7’s local drive show and was the first voice heard on air when the station launched with a Red Hot Chili Peppers interview.

From 2006 to 2008, Blackwell worked on Nova 100’s Hughesy & Ed Melbourne breakfast show as an anchor, before teaming up with Hayley Pearson to host the night show, Launchpad. In 2009, he was a co-host alongside Meshel Laurie on Nova 106.9’s breakfast show in Brisbane, and from 2010, Marty Sheargold joined the team to become Meshel, Tim and Marty. In 2011 they became the Nova Network's national drive team replacing Fitzy & Wippa. After Meshel Laurie departed in 2014, Kate Ritchie joined the drive show which became known as Kate, Tim and Marty.

Blackwell regularly appeared on Network 10's The Project, Today Extra and Getaway, and as a passionate AFL supporter, Tim is also involved in the Hawthorn Football Club.

In 2019, the Nine Network launched My Way, with Blackwell as narrator for the weekly episodes.

In late 2020, podcast series Introducing with Tim Blackwell launched, with Tim sitting down for weekly episodes with some of the biggest artists in music as well as some of the most interesting emerging talent.

In February 2026, Blackwell and Ricki-Lee Coulter will move from Nova's national drive show to host breakfast on Nova 96.9 in Sydney.
