= Kate Ritchie =

Australian actress, radio presenter, and children's author

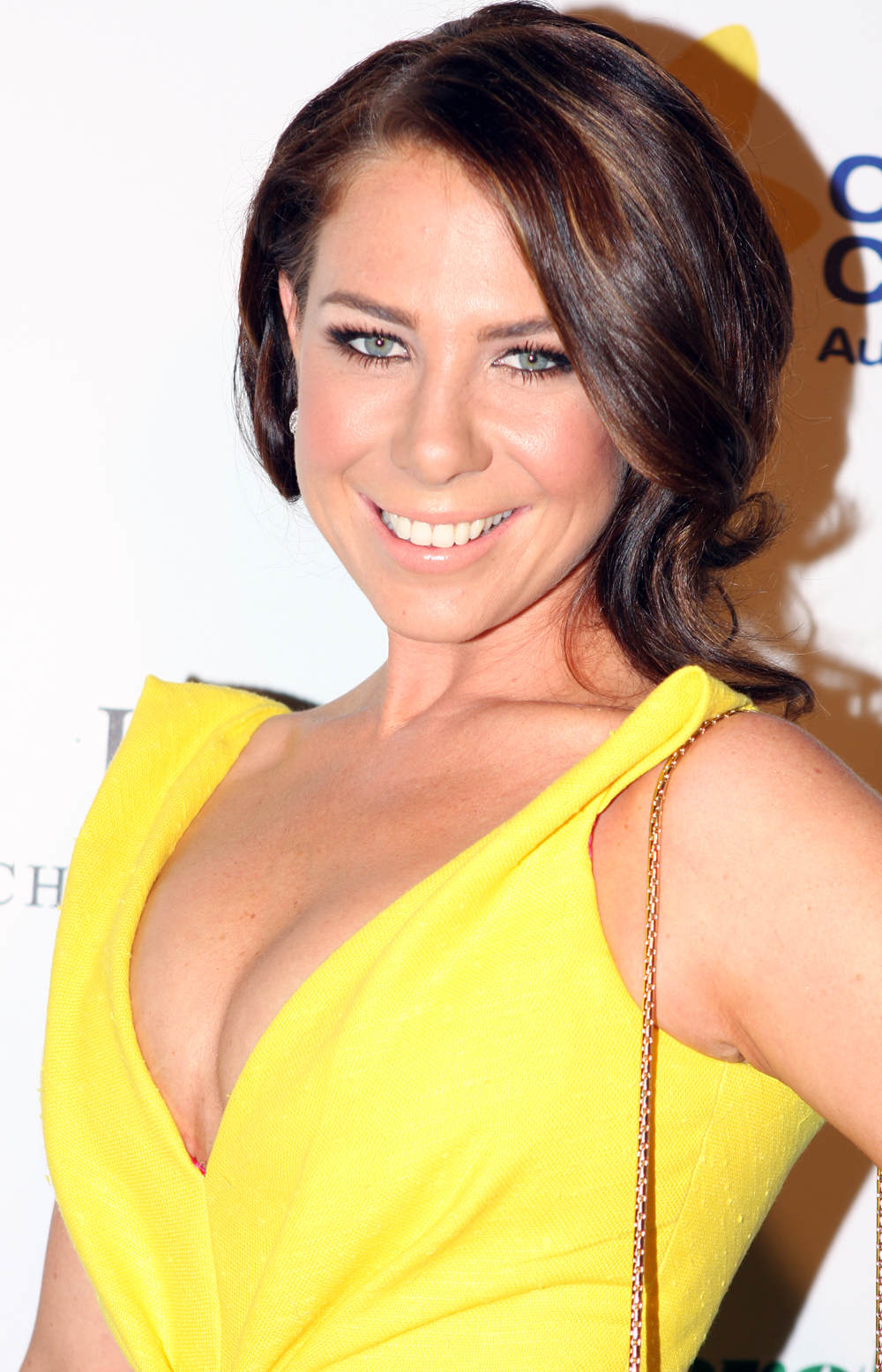
- Ritchie in 2012
- Born: Katherine Leigh Ritchie
- Education: Hurlstone Agricultural High School
- Occupations: Actress; radio presenter; children's author
- Years active: 1986–present
- Spouse: Stuart Webb (m. 2010–2019)
- Children: 1
- Awards: Gold Logie Award for Most Popular Personality on Australian Television (2007 & 2008) — Home and Away

Katherine Leigh Ritchie is an Australian actress, radio presenter, and children's author. She is best known for her long-running role as original character Sally Fletcher on the television soap opera Home and Away, for which she won two Gold Logie awards. She played the character for 20 years, appearing from the pilot episode in 1988 until 2008. She currently co-hosts Nova FM's drive show Fitzy, Wippa & Kate alongside Ryan Fitzgerald and Michael 'Wippa' Wipfli. Ritchie was part of Nova FM's national drive show, Kate, Tim & Joel with Tim Blackwell and Joel Creasey from 2014 until 2023.

Prior to her retirement from Home and Away, she shared with fellow original cast members Ray Meagher and Norman Coburn the record for the longest continuous role in an Australian drama series. Following a five-year absence, Ritchie returned to Home and Away in 2013 for a short reprise of her role as Sally Fletcher to commemorate the 25th anniversary of the series. In addition to 20 years on Home and Away, Ritchie has also hosted various television events and appeared in commercials.

In 2022, Ritchie appeared as a judge on the tenth season of Australia's Got Talent. In 2023, she starred as Carol Spiers in 7 Network's two-part crime drama series The Claremont Murders, appearing opposite Erik Thomson, who played her husband.

== Early life and education ==
Katherine Leigh Ritchie was born to parents Heather and Steve, and she has three younger siblings.

Ritchie attended Campbelltown North Public School and Hurlstone Agricultural High School – the latter a New South Wales agricultural and selective school.

== Career ==
Ritchie was cast as Molly, the child lead in the 1986 Nine Network–PBL mini-series Cyclone Tracy, starring Chris Haywood and Tracy Mann. She started working with Home and Away in 1987, at age 8. Production began in July 1987 (shortly before her ninth birthday) and it premiered on the Seven Network on 17 January 1988. In 2006, Ritchie played "Nicole" in the ABC film Stepfather of the Bride. While promoting Home and Away in the United Kingdom in 2006 with Mark Furze and Jodi Gordon, Ritchie appeared on The Friday Night Project and Loose Women, and appeared on interviews for Five and Five Life.

She was involved with the Campbelltown Musical Society.

In 2006, Ritchie was a contestant on the celebrity singing competition It Takes Two, partnered with Troy Cassar-Daley. The pair placed fourth in the competition. She co-hosted the second series of It Takes Two with Grant Denyer in 2007. In 2007 Ritchie joined Nova radio to co-host the drive show with comedian Akmal Saleh, replacing Matthew Newton. She was replaced in May by New Zealand comedian Cal Wilson.

In September 2007, Ritchie announced that she would be leaving Home and Away in mid-December. Her final scenes were filmed on 13 December 2007, and she last appeared on Australian screens as Sally Fletcher on 3 April 2008, with her final episode being screened on UK terrestrial television on 12 May 2008.

On 14 January 2008, Ritchie began work on the Nova 96.9 breakfast show with Merrick & Rosso. Shortly after the 2008 Logie Awards, Ritchie did an interview with Rove McManus on Network Ten, her first interview with another network since leaving Home and Away, and her first television appearance since leaving the show. On 16 October Ritchie appeared on pay-TV, on the Merrick & Rosso Show.

In November, it was revealed that Ritchie would appear in the second series of Underbelly, as Judi Kane, the wife of slain 1970s standover man Les Kane. The series screened in 2009. This was her first TV drama role since leaving Home and Away. Throughout 2009, Ritchie continued her radio role on the Merrick & Rosso and Kate Ritchie Show.

In 2009 Ritchie became the face of Vaseline.

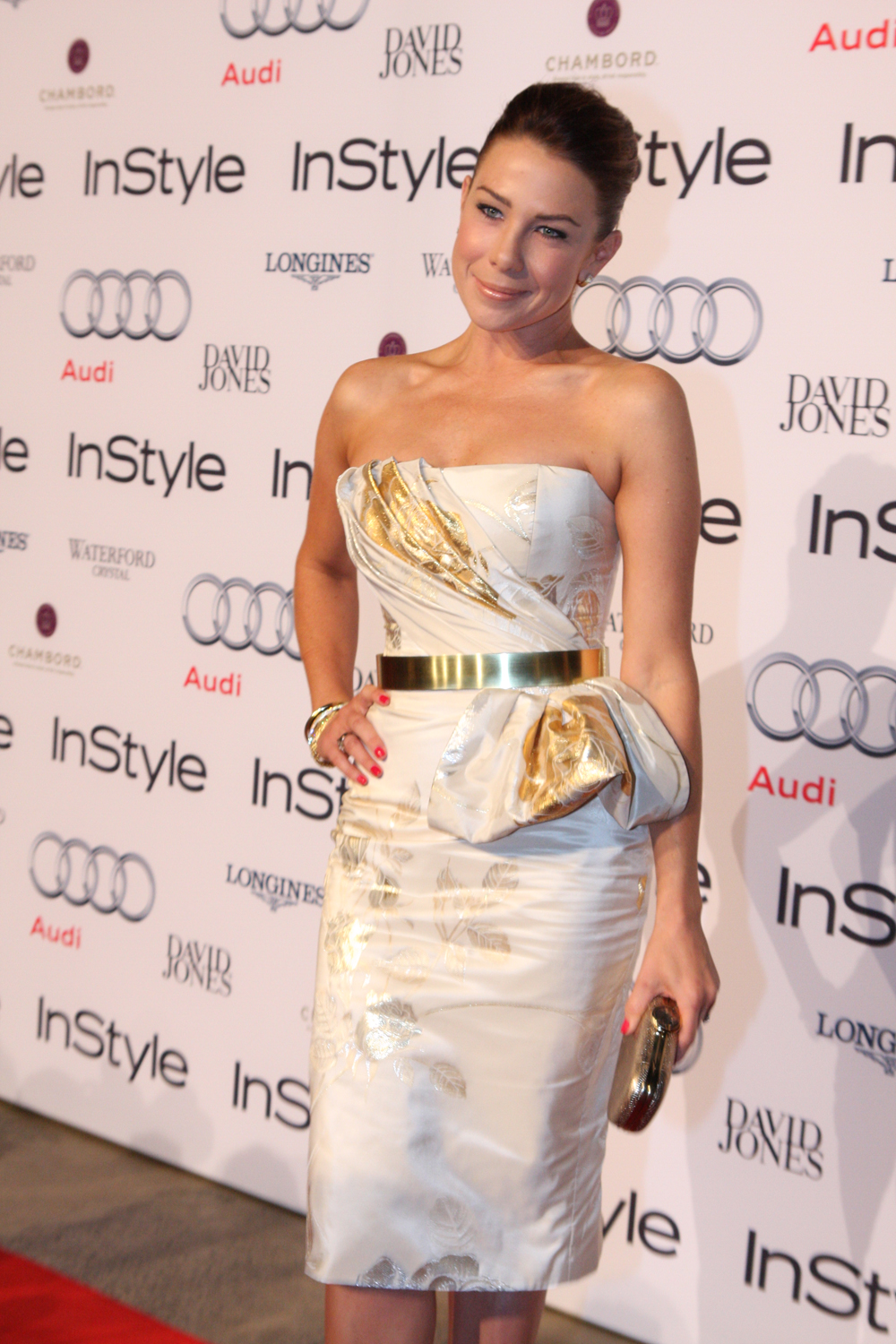
Ritchie in 2012

On 10 November 2009, Ritchie announced she would be leaving Nova 96.9's breakfast team and returning to acting. In January 2010 it was announced that Ritchie had been cast with a lead role in Nine's new police drama Cops L.A.C. The series did not rate well and was cancelled after the season finale.

In 2012, Ritchie narrated the Australian version of the reality series Don't Tell the Bride, which aired on Network Ten. In early 2013, it was announced that Ritchie was returning to Home & Away, reprising her role as Sally Fletcher.

In 2013, Ritchie announced via Twitter that she would be hosting the Nova FM drive show with Tim Blackwell and Marty Sheargold in 2014, following the departure of Meshel Laurie, who went on to host Breakfast on Nova 100 in Melbourne. In 2015 the team won Best Networked Program at the Australian Commercial Radio Awards, and the Best On Air team in both 2016 and 2017.

In 2016 Ritchie released a children's book illustrated by Hannah Sommerville called I Just Couldn't Wait To Meet You. Her second book, It's Not Scribble to Me, was illustrated by Jedda Robaard and published by Random House Australia in 2018.

Ritchie was to host the retrospective 50th anniversary of Play School in July 2016.

In June 2021, Ritchie was announced to be a judge for Nicole Scherzinger on the tenth season of Australia's Got Talent alongside returning judge Shane Jacobson, and Britain's Got Talent judges Alesha Dixon and David Walliams.

In 2023, it was announced that Ritchie would be permanently departing her Nova radio show Kate, Tim & Joel after being absence for some time. It was later revealed that she would join Fitzy & Wippa and co-host Fitzy & Wippa with Kate Ritchie from March 2023. It was also announced that singer-songwriter and television presenter Ricki-Lee Coulter would replace Ritchie on Ricki-Lee, Tim & Joel.

After some years absent from the small screen, in 2023, Ritchie returned in the Seven Network drama series The Claremont Murders, based on real serial killings that took place in Western Australia, and starred as Carol Spiers, the mother of Sarah Spiers, and appeared opposite Erik Thomson.

On 18 July 2024, Ritchie was named for ABC factual series The Role of a Lifetime.

In February 2026, Ritchie will return to co-hosting Nova's national drive program when Fitzy, Wippa & Kate moves from Nova 96.9 breakfast to national drive.

== Personal life ==
Ritchie became engaged to Stuart Webb, a rugby league player for St George Illawarra Dragons, in September 2009. They married on 25 September 2010 in an outdoor wedding at Quamby Estate in Tasmania. Their daughter was born in 2014.

In November 2019, Stuart Webb agreed to an AVO, which was applied for by a police constable on behalf of Ritchie following a domestic incident on 17 October. The AVO prevented Webb from stalking, intimidating, assaulting, or threatening, as well as approaching or being in the company of Ritchie "for at least 12 hours after drinking alcohol or taking illicit drugs".

In August 2022, Ritchie was caught drink driving with alcohol level of 0.06, and was suspended from driving for three months.

== Filmography ==
| Year | Title | Role | Notes |
|---|---|---|---|
| 1986 | Cyclone Tracy | Molly | Miniseries |
| 1988–2008, 2013 | Home and Away | Sally Fletcher | Pilot TV film, Seasons 1–21 (main role); Season 26 (recurring role) |
| 2003 | Home and Away: Hearts Divided | Sally Fletcher | Direct-to-video special |
| 2006 | Stepfather of the Bride | Nicole | TV film |
| 2007 | Mere Oblivion | Sonia | Short film |
| 2009 | Underbelly: A Tale of Two Cities | Judy Kane | Season 2, Episodes 4 & 5 |
| 2010 | Cops L.A.C. | Samantha Cooper | Season 1 (main role, 13 episodes) |
| 2013 | Mr & Mrs Murder | Celeste Doyle | Season 1, episode 2 |
| 2013 | It's a Date | Zara | Season 1, episode 4 |
| 2023 | The Claremont Murders | Carol Spiers | Miniseries (2 episodes) |
| 2025 | The Role of a Lifetime | Mum | 5 episodes |

=== Television self appearances ===
| Year | Title | Role | Notes |
|---|---|---|---|
| 2022 | Australia's Got Talent | Herself | Judge |
| 2012 | Don't Tell The Bride | Narrator | Reality TV series |
| 2010–2011 | Talkin' 'Bout Your Generation | Contestant / Surprise Guest | 2 episodes |
| 2009 | The 23rd Annual ARIA Music Awards | Co-host | Co-hosted with Gyton Grantley |
| 2007–2009 | Carols in the Domain | Co-host | Co-hosted annually with Grant Denyer for 3 years |
| 2006–2007 | It Takes Two | Herself | Contestant (2006); Co-host (2007) |
| 2002 | The Best of Aussie Drama | Host | TV documentary |

== Awards and nominations ==
| Year | Association | Category | Nominated work | Result | Ref. |
|---|---|---|---|---|---|
| 2006 | Logie Awards | Silver Logie Award for Most Popular Actress | Home and Away (Season 18) | Won | |
| 2006 | Logie Awards | Gold Logie Award for Most Popular Personality on Australian Television | Home and Away (Season 18) | Nominated | |
| 2007 | Logie Awards | Silver Logie Award for Most Popular Actress | Home and Away (Season 19) | Won | |
| 2007 | Logie Awards | Gold Logie Award for Most Popular Personality on Australian Television | Home and Away (Season 19) | Won | |
| 2008 | Logie Awards | Silver Logie Award for Most Popular Actress | Home and Away (Season 20) | Won | |
| 2008 | Logie Awards | Gold Logie Award for Most Popular Personality on Australian Television | Home and Away (Season 20) | Won | |
| 2009 | Logie Awards | Silver Logie Award for Most Popular Actress | Home and Away (Season 21) | Nominated | |
| 2009 | Logie Awards | Gold Logie Award for Most Popular Personality on Australian Television | Home and Away (Season 21) | Nominated | |
| 2009 | AFI Awards | Best Guest or Supporting Actress in a Television Drama | Underbelly: A Tale of Two Cities (Episode 4) | Nominated | |

Awards and achievements
| Preceded by John Wood for Blue Heelers | Gold Logie Award; Most Popular Personality on Australian Television; 2007 – 2008 for Home and Away | Succeeded by Rebecca Gibney for Packed to the Rafters |
