= Nathan Basha =

Disability advocate

- Born: Australia
- Occupations: Motivational speaker, Filmmaker, Disability advocate
- Years active: 2010–present
- Known for: Advocacy around equity in employment access for people with disability
- Notable work: Founder of No Boundaries, Ambassador for Bus Stop Films, Co-executive producer on "Baby Cat"
- Awards: Finalist for New South Wales 2016 Young Australian of the Year, Community Service Award from the New South Wales government

Nathan Basha is an Australian motivational speaker, filmmaker and advocate around equity in employment access for people with disability.

Basha was born with Down syndrome, and states that doctors told his parents when he was born they could "'institutionalise' him, adopt him out or take him home." Basha says they took him home and "made a pact to do everything they could do to make my life as ordinary as possible".

== Career ==
In 2010, Basha began working at Sydney radio station Nova 96.9 as an office assistant, where he still works alongside radio hosts Fitzy and Wippa.

Basha founded his motivational speaking social enterprise No Boundaries in 2012, through which he seeks to inspire others living with disability to find their dream job, and positively impact social attitudes—specifically those in the Australian corporate sector—around the employment of people with disabilities.

In 2014, Basha was nominated for the Australian Human Rights Commission's Young People's Human Rights Medal.

Basha is passionate about films and filmmaking and, in 2016, he became an ambassador for Bus Stop Films.

Also in 2016, he was featured in a video for a New South Wales government advertising campaign called "Don't Dis My Ability", where he shares his experience of living with Down syndrome, which he describes as "a disadvantage, not a disability." He was one of four people with a disability to be featured in the campaign, which seeks to share the benefits of employment for people with disability and the organisations they work for.

He was a finalist for the New South Wales 2016 Young Australian of the Year Award for his work as a disability advocate. In the same year, Basha received a Community Service Award from the New South Wales government for his work in advocating for people with disability.

In 2019, Australian painter Patrick Pace painted Basha for his submission to the 2019 Archibald Prize, one of Australia's most high-profile portraiture competitions.

In 2021, Basha was announced as a co-executive producer on Bus Stop Films' first feature film, "Baby Cat". The film seeks to tell the story of the lived experience of a woman living with trisomy 21 (a form of Down syndrome), and is currently in pre-production.

Basha was featured in a 2021 interview with paralympian Dylan Alcott as part of his series Dylan Alcott Interviews on SBS television.

He is an ambassador for the Australian Federal Government program IncludeAbility.
