= Wippa =

Australian radio broadcaster

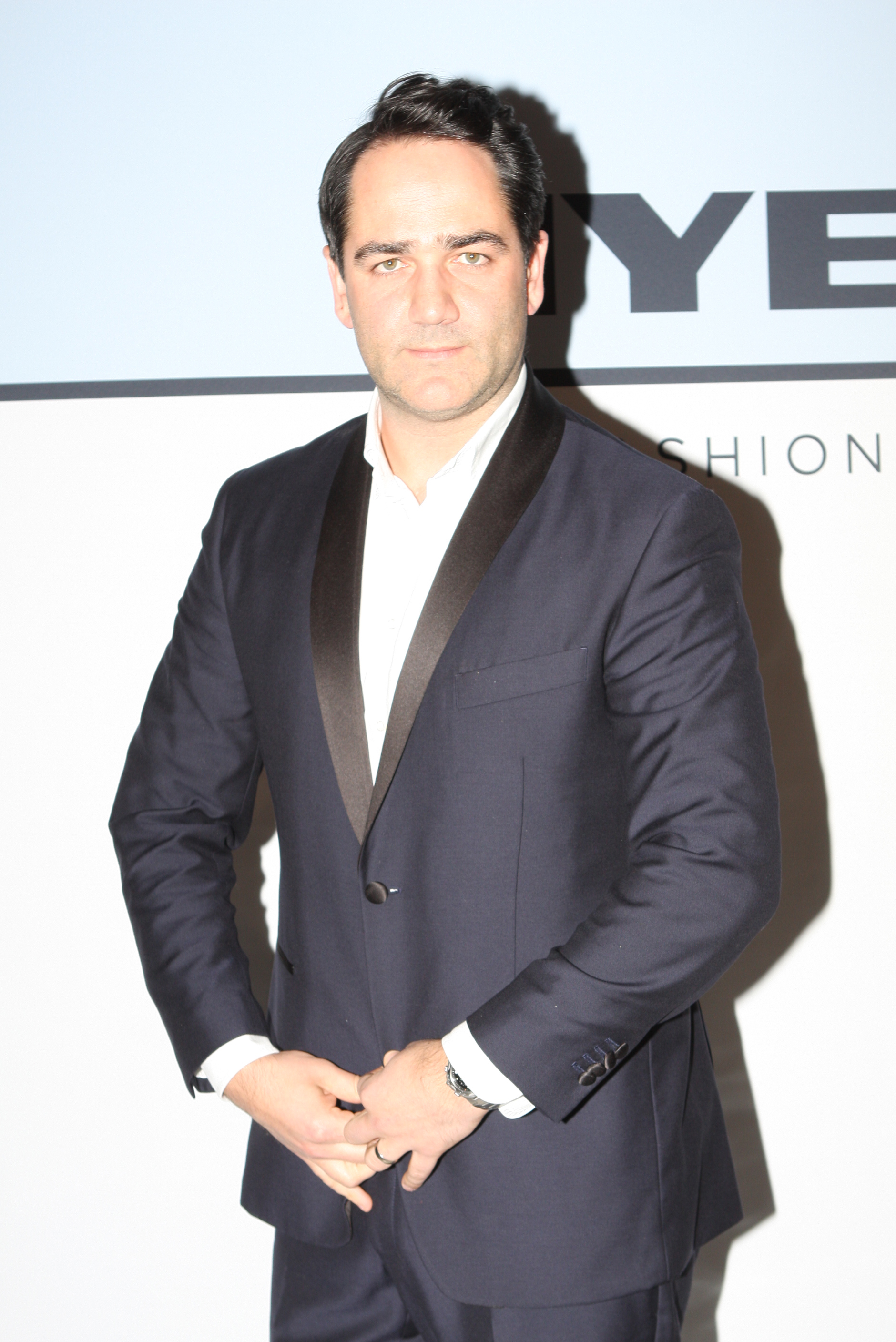
- Wippa in August 2015
- Born: Michael Wipfli; 29 September 1979 (age 47); Melbourne, Victoria, Australia
- Spouse: Lisa Robertson (m. 2013)
- Children: 3
- Presenting career
- Show: Fitzy, Wippa & Kate
- Station: Nova 96.9
- Network: Nova Network
- Style: Breakfast show
- Country: Australia

Michael Wipfli (born 29 September 1979), commonly known as "Wippa", is an Australian radio presenter and comedian who is a co-host on the Nova 96.9 breakfast show Fitzy, Wippa & Kate alongside Ryan Fitzgerald and Kate Ritchie.

== Early life ==
Wippa was born in Melbourne, Victoria, Australia in 1979 to John and Christine Wipfli. His father is from Switzerland, where his surname originates; and moved to Melbourne when he was 20-years-old. His ancestral background was explored on the 2024 TV series Origin Odyssey, hosted by Shaun Micallef. He has two sisters: Louise and Kate.

Wippa completed building management certificate at TAFE and was part of a freelance building crew, which gave him the freedom to do some casual work in entertainment.

== Career ==
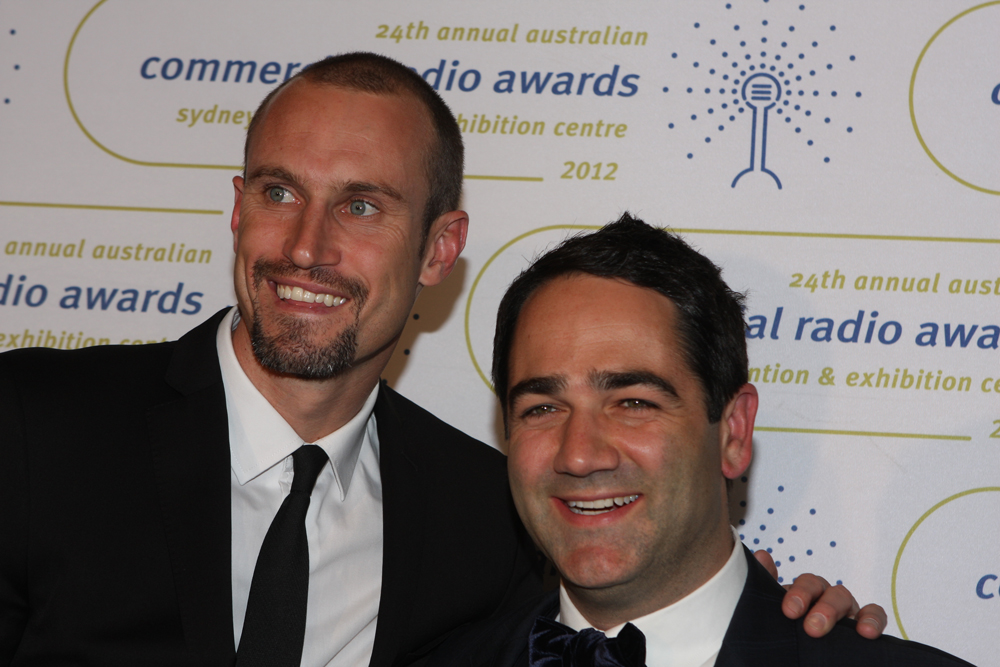
Fitzy and Wippa

After completing a short radio course, Wippa worked in Port Augusta. He returned to Melbourne and become a regular on the "Hamish & Andy" Saturday morning show.

Wippa got his headlining start on the Em, Wippa and Ollie breakfast show on 92.9 in Perth in 2005.

In 2009, Wippa joined Nova's drive show Ryan, Monty and Wippa. During an on-air stunt seeing Wippa eat 12 'whopper' burgers over the course of a show, he gained the alternative nickname 'Whopper'. Ryan Shelton left at the end of 2010 to focus on television, and Monty moved to Nova Sydney's Merrick, Dools and Monty breakfast show.

In November 2010, it was announced that Wippa would be joining Ryan Fitzgerald to host Fitzy & Wippa in 2011. Fitzy and Wippa were nominated for the 2011 Australian Commercial Radio Awards in the best on-air team, Metro FM category.

Wippa appeared as a celebrity contestant on the Nine Network's quiz show Millionaire Hot Seat in 2012 where he became the first contestant to go home without reaching the $1000 question after he famously answered "tropical bird" to the simple $500 question "What is a pecan?".

On 27 November 2015, Wippa joined radio co-host Fitzy to host a one-off special Up Reasonably Late with Fitzy and Wippa on Network Ten.

In 2016, Fitzy and Wippa were team captains on All Star Family Feud. Wippa's mother, sister and grandmother Norma were on his team. They also appeared in Shark Tank Australia to spruik Wippa's product the "Mup", a mint in the bottom of a coffee cup. Fitzy and Wippa also hosted the Nine Network show 20 to 1 for one season.

In September 2020, Wipfli was announced as a celebrity contestant on the revived new season of The Celebrity Apprentice Australia in 2021.

In November 2025, the Nine Network announced that Wipfli will guest co-host on Today, joining Samantha Armytage during the holiday season while regular hosts Karl Stefanovic and Sarah Abo are on leave.

In February 2026, Fitzy, Wippa & Kate will move from Nova 96.9 Sydney breakfast to host a national drive show.

== Personal life ==
Wippa married Lisa Robertson in 2013. They have three children.
