= Tim Blackwell =

Tim Blackwell may refer to:

- Tim Blackwell (baseball) (born 1952), American baseball player, coach, and manager
- Tim Blackwell (broadcaster) (born 1981), Australian radio broadcaster
