= 1593 AM =

AM radio frequency

The following radio stations broadcast on AM frequency 1593 kHz:

== Australia ==
- SEN Track in Melbourne, Victoria

== China ==
- CNR The Voice of China, mainly in Changzhou

== Italy ==
- "Radio Gold" at Sicily (transmits AM stereo)

== Taiwan ==
- May used to transfer CNR The Voice of China in Kinmen and Matsu

== Thailand ==
- "Sor. Wor. Thor." at Tambon Don Tako, Mueang Ratchaburi District (transmits AM stereo)
