= Ricki‑Lee & Tim =

Australian radio show

Ricki-Lee & Tim
- Genre: Comedy
- Running time: 180 minutes
- Country of origin: Australia
- Language: English
- Home station: Nova 96.9 Sydney
- Syndicates: Nova 100 Melbourne, Nova 106.9 Brisbane, Nova 91.9 Adelaide, Nova 93.7 Perth
- Hosted by: Ricki-Lee Coulter; Tim Blackwell
- Starring: Sarah Harris
- Recording studio: Pyrmont, New South Wales
- Audio format: Stereo
- Website: Ricki-Lee & Tim
- Podcast: iTunes

Ricki-Lee & Tim is an Australian breakfast radio show on Nova 96.9 in Sydney. It is hosted by Ricki-Lee Coulter and Tim Blackwell, with newsreader Sarah Harris.

The show airs from 6 am to 9 am on weekday mornings with music and daily topic discussions and special guests. A highlights package of the show, airs across the Nova Network on weeknights from 6 pm and 7pm.

A daily podcast featuring the best bits from each show is available on the Nova Player as is the podcast for all other Nova FM shows in Australia.

== History ==
=== Meshel, Tim & Marty (2010–2013) ===
The program commenced 17 May 2010 and has undergone several host changes throughout its run. Meshel Laurie, Tim Blackwell and Marty Sheargold began broadcasting together in 2010 on Nova 106.9 in Brisbane, where their show became a top‑rating breakfast program.

In August 2011, Nova announced that Fitzy & Wippa would move from Drive to the breakfast shift on Nova 96.9, with Meshel, Tim and Marty taking over the national Drive program.

In November 2013, Meshel Laurie departed the show to host Meshel & Tommy on Nova 100 alongside comedian Tommy Little from 2014.

=== Kate, Tim & Marty (2014–2020) ===
In November 2013, it was announced that Kate Ritchie would replace Meshel Laurie, joining the program in January 2014.

The show won Best Networked Program at the Australian Commercial Radio Awards (ACRAs) in 2015. The team continued its success with ACRA wins in 2016 and 2017 for Best On‑Air Team (FM, Metropolitan).

In 2018, during its fifth year as Australia’s highest‑rating national Drive show, Kate, Tim & Marty expanded its reach by simulcasting on 48 regional FM stations across Grant Broadcasters, Ace Radio, Broadcast Operations Group, Red FM and Snow FM. Fitzy & Wippa had been broadcasting in many of these markets since 2014.

=== Kate, Tim & Joel (2020–2023) ===
On 24 July 2020, Marty Sheargold announced his resignation from the program, with his final show airing on 11 September 2020. Joel Creasey was subsequently announced as his replacement and joined the show on 14 September 2020.

=== Ricki‑Lee, Tim & Joel (2023–2026) ===
In March 2023, Nova confirmed that Ricki‑Lee Coulter—who had been filling in for Kate Ritchie since October 2022—would permanently replace Ritchie.

Coulter and Tim Blackwell broadcast the show from Nova 96.9’s Sydney studios, while Joel Creasey hosts from Nova 100 in Melbourne.

In January 2026, Nova announced that Coulter and Blackwell would depart the national Drive program to host Ricki‑Lee & Tim on Nova 96.9, a Sydney Breakfast show. Creasey would front The Joel Creasey Show at lunchtime across the Nova Network from April 2026.

=== Ricki‑Lee & Tim (2026–present) ===
Ricki‑Lee & Tim launched as Nova 96.9’s Sydney breakfast program on 9 February. It was later announced that Sarah Harris would join the show as newsreader.
