= Life FM (Adelaide) =

Radio station in Adelaide, South Australia

Coordinates: 34°52′43″S 138°30′58″E

- Formerly: Alta Mira FM (1993-1998), Life FM (1998-2016), 1079 Life FM (2016-2023), Life FM (2023-Present)
- Type: Non-profit
- Industry: Radio broadcasting
- Founded: 1995
- Headquarters: Adelaide, Australia
- Area served: Adelaide metropolitan area
- Key people: David Turrell (CEO); Scott Sharrock (Chairperson)
- Products: Christian radio programming
- Website: Life FM

Life FM (callsign: 5RAM) is a Christian radio station in Adelaide, South Australia. Life FM broadcasts on the 107.9 MHz frequency.

== History ==
Life FM began broadcasting on October the 6th, 1993. But it was 20 years of preparation and planning before then that brought the dream into a reality. The station began broadcasting under the name "Alta Mira FM". Later it was renamed "Life FM".

In September 2016, Life FM rebranded and changed its name to "1079 Life", dropping the FM in the title in recognition of the emergence of digital radio, not just the FM band.

In October 2023, Life FM rebranded back to "Life FM" with a new logo, colour scheme and website, in partnership with the design agency Neue Studio.

The station has been an incubator for local media talent in Adelaide, most notably Brenton Ragless and Kate Collins, who began with Life FM hosting the evening show. Both are now with the Nine Network on their prime time news show. As well as Aiden Grant who has also gone on to work at Nova 919 and 96three FM.

== Format ==
The station's motto is Life. Love. Adelaide.

Breakfast and Drive shows are both run as magazine programs with a sampling of the latest adult contemporary and Christian music breaking up the segments on news, opinion and lifestyle. There are also sport, music and talk programs throughout the week.

Life FM won a SACBA award for Community Engagement in 2014.

The station has won 3 SANFL Media Awards, "Best Commentary" in 2004 & 2008 and "Best Radio Interview" in 2007. 1079 Life also simulcasts Nine News from 6pm weeknights.

== Programming ==
As of 2026, the major featured on-air line-up consists of:

- Adelaide's Good Taste Breakfast, hosted by Rebecca "Bec" Seabrooke and Liam Cant (previously Zac Spencer) from 6:00am – 9:00am weekdays
- The Daily, hosted by Cam Want from 10:00am - 1:00pm on weekdays
- Afternoons on Life, hosted by Scott Curtis in rotation from 1:00pm – 3:00pm weekdays
- Maz For the Drive Home, hosted by Mary-Anne 'Maz' Maio from 3:00pm – 6:00pm weekdays
- Nine News Simulcast every weeknight from 6:00pm
- The Takeover hosted by various hosts from 7:00pm – 9:00pm weekdays
- Pomfus and Jodie from 10:00am on Saturdays
- Various Christian talk shows and segments on Sundays throughout the day
- Jodie and Pomfus hosted by Jodie Falco and Pete Scriven on Saturday morning from 10:00 am – 1:00 pm

== Related stations ==
100.7 Riverland Life FM based in Loxton was formed with help from Life FM Adelaide.
