= Stuart Webb =

Australian rugby league footballer

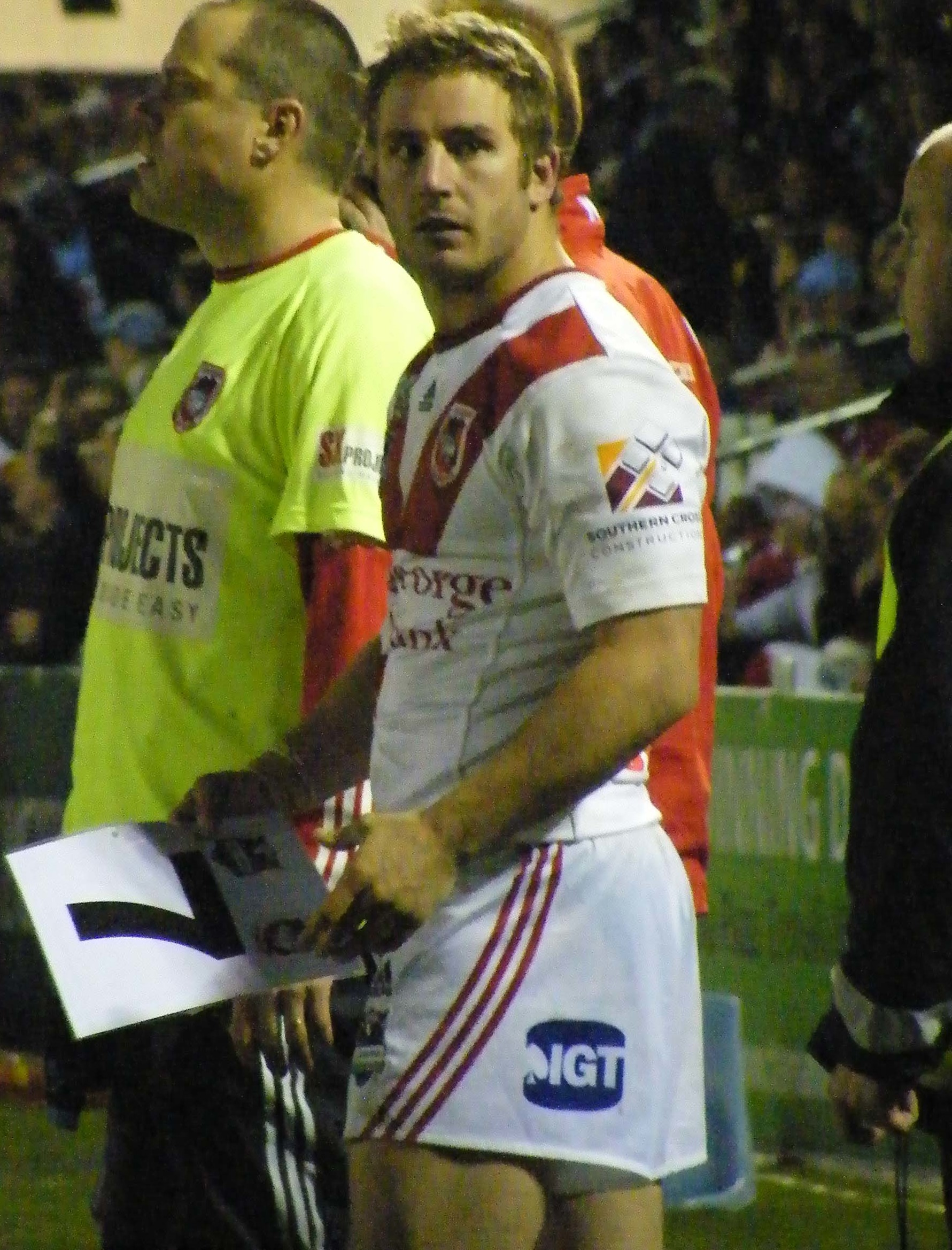
- Webb on 2 August 2008

Personal information
- Full name: Stuart Webb
- Born: 3 September 1980 (age 46) Uralla, New South Wales, Australia

Playing information
- Height: 180 cm (5 ft 11 in)
- Weight: 89 kg (14 st 0 lb)
- Position: Hooker, Lock
Club
Years	Team	Pld	T	G	FG	P
2003–05	Sydney Roosters	48	6	0	0	24
2006–07	South Sydney	21	2	0	0	8
2008–09	St. George Illawarra	19	1	0	0	4
	Total	88	9	0	0	36

Stuart Webb (born 3 September 1980) is a former professional rugby league footballer who played for the St George Illawarra Dragons in the National Rugby League. He previously played for the Sydney Roosters and the South Sydney Rabbitohs. His position of choice was hooker. He is currently the league coach of the Helensburgh Tigers in the Illawarra Rugby League.

== Playing career ==
Webb made his first-grade debut for the Sydney Roosters in Round 10, 2003 against Newcastle. Although Webb played with the club for three seasons, he did not appear in any their finals campaigns and missed out on selection in the 2003 and 2004 grand finals.

In 2006, Webb joined the Roosters' arch-rivals South Sydney. Souths finished last in 2006, claiming the wooden spoon after winning only three games all season.

In 2008, Webb joined St George Illawarra and made 19 appearances for them, including his only taste of finals football: a 38–6 loss against eventual premiers Manly-Warringah. This in turn would prove to be Webb's last game in first grade.

== Personal life ==
In late 2005, Webb was one of twelve players in the NRL to pose for the League of Their Own 2006 calendar. The publication was produced in the style of the famous Dieux du Stade calendars to raise money for the Koori Kids foundation. In 2006, Webb also appeared in the Naked Rugby League 2007/08 charity calendar, with its sales benefiting the National Breast Cancer Foundation of Australia.

In September 2009, Webb became engaged to radio personality and former Home and Away star Kate Ritchie, proposing to her while on a European holiday.

The two married on 25 September 2010, and have one child together.

On 7 November 2019, Webb agreed to an AVO which was applied for by a police constable on behalf of Ritchie following a domestic incident on 17 October. The AVO prevents Webb from stalking, intimidating, assaulting or threatening, as well as approaching or being in the company of her "for at least 12 hours after drinking alcohol or taking illicit drugs". In the same hearing Webb was given a 12-month community correction order and disqualified for driving for five months for drink driving.

== Career highlights ==
- First Grade Debut: Sydney Roosters v Newcastle Knights on 18 May 2003 (Round 10) at Allianz Stadium.
