= SBS Radio =

Australian multicultural radio network

- Melbourne and Sydney; Australia
- Broadcast area: Australia (national) via AM, FM, DAB+, digital TV, online and satellite
- Frequency: Various
- Branding: SBS Audio

Programming
- Languages: English; Various
- Format: Multilingual programming
- Subchannels: SBS Chill; SBS PopAsia; SBS Arabic; SBS South Asian; SBS PopEuro; SBS Radio 4

Ownership
- Owner: Special Broadcasting Service

History
- First air date: 9 June 1975; 51 years ago (as 2EA, 3EA); 1 January 1978; 48 years ago (as SBS)

Technical information
- Class: Public

Links
- Website: sbs.com.au/audio/radio

SBS Radio is an Australian radio network owned by the Special Broadcasting Service directed towards newly arrived immigrants in Australia. It originally began as two stations based in Melbourne and Sydney, set up to provide pre-recorded information about the then-new Medibank health care system in languages other than English. Nowadays, the network targets the estimated 4+ million Australians who speak a language other than English at home with programs in 68 languages.

Like SBS Television, SBS Radio supplements its government funding with paid-for information campaigns for government agencies and non-profit organisations as well as commercial advertising and sponsorship.

== History and evolution ==
The history of SBS Radio goes back to the 1970s when the government started considering the demand for broadcasting in languages other than English after a mass-influx of foreign-born populace post World War Two.

In January 1975, Al Grassby, the Commissioner of Community Relations at the time, approached future members of the SBS executive board about his intention to start up two experimental radio stations in Sydney and Melbourne, which would almost always broadcast in non-English languages, on a budget of around $67,000. The amount was sufficient to pay for two broadcasters per program and rented studios in the two cities.

On 12 May 1975, the ABC established 3ZZ in Melbourne, which broadcast predominantly in languages other than English.

After some months of planning, on 9 June 1975, 2EA (EA standing for Ethnic Australia), opened in Sydney by Al Grassby, with the first language heard on 2EA being Greek. Not long afterwards, on 23 June 3EA opened in Melbourne. Both stations operated under 3-month temporary licenses, with 42 hour per week schedules in seven and eight languages, respectively. The initial purposes of the stations were to inform ethnic communities about proposed changes in the healthcare system via the new Medibank scheme. By the end of the year the two stations were broadcasting in Arabic, Cantonese, Croatian, German, Greek, Hebrew, Italian, Latvian, Lithuanian, Macedonian, Maltese, Mandarin, Polish, Russian, Serbian, Slovenian, Spanish, and Turkish.

Studios were first located at the 2CBA studios in Five Dock in Sydney, and in the Armstrong Audio Video studios in southern Melbourne. In May 1976, the Consultative Committee on Ethnic Broadcaster was founded to plan out the future of ethnic broadcasting. That same year, four new languages, Dutch, French, Polish and Romanian were added to 3EA's schedule; this pales in comparison to the nineteen languages added to 2EA's lineup, which included Armenian, Assyrian, Bangla, Czech, Dutch, Estonian, French, Gujarati, Hebrew, Hindi, Hungarian, Latvian, Lithuanian, Portuguese, Punjabi, Slovak, Tamil, Ukrainian and Urdu. It was also around this time that the two stations had ceased to be known as "experimental stations", and that they had become permanent.

During 1977, programming and language coverage expanded to 119 hours per week in 33 languages on 2EA and 103 hours per week in 22 languages on 3EA. Of the 33 languages on 2EA, three languages, Finnish, Romanian, and Vietnamese, had only been added that year, and of the 22 on 3EA, four languages, Bulgarian, Estonian, Hungarian, and Portuguese, were new additions.

On 15 July 1977, 3ZZ was shut down by the Australian government.

In November 1977, the Broadcasting and Television Act 1942 was amended to form the Special Broadcasting Service, which commenced operation and assumed responsibility for 2EA and 3EA on 1 January 1978. 3EA also found a new studio site at 35 Bank Street in South Melbourne.

By 1978 both stations were broadcasting a total of 68 languages a week and a total of 229 hours in total. In April a soccer match from Yugoslavia was regarded as the very first live overseas broadcast on 2/3EA, and in June, 2EA moved from Five Dock to 257 Clarence Street in Sydney. Thirteen new languages, Albanian, Armenian, Czech, Danish, Finnish, Hindi, Norwegian, Punjabi, Russian, Slovak, Swedish, Ukrainian and Urdu, were also added to 3EA that year, while only two, Filipino and Tongan, were added to 2EA's schedule. The following year 2EA began broadcasting in Queensland through the community radio station 4EB. Eleven new languages were also added to the two station's schedule; six, Cantonese, Indonesian, Khmer, Mandarin, Sinhala and Tamil on 3EA, and five, Danish, Fijian, Korean, Norwegian and Swedish on 2EA.

The 1980s saw a new-look SBS executive board appointed, with former rugby captain and Lord Mayor of Sydney Sir Nicholas Shehadie as its chair. Five new languages in total were added to the station's lineup, three in Melbourne and two in Sydney. The decade also saw the 1982 World Cup being broadcast on the airwaves, with live commentary of some matches broadcast in several languages. Sinhalese was added to 2EA's schedule, whereas Lao and an Aboriginal-centred program was added to 3EA. Talkback was also introduced and several English programs were discontinued on 3EA to allow airtime for other languages. Khmer was also added to 2EA's schedule.

In August 1986, the government proposed legislation that would amalgamate SBS into the ABC. This was highly unpopular with ethnic-minority communities, and caused protests from both SBS staff and communities, resulting in the Prime Minister of Australia, Bob Hawke, to announce in 1987 that the proposed amalgamation would not proceed. One year later 2EA entered new facilities in Bondi Junction, with 3EA moving to premises in the Australian Ballet Centre.

In the 1990s 2EA established a live feed to the Soviet space station MIR for a live broadcast with two of its cosmonauts, and with the fall of the Berlin Wall in October, 2EA also broadcast government proceedings from Berlin. Cook Islands Māori was added to both station's schedules, whereas Fijian, Kurdish, Samoan, and Tongan were added to 3EA. Samoan was later added to 2EA's schedule the following year. 1992 saw SBS attempt a restructuring of its staff, which resulted in a strike against the move. Filipino, New Zealand Maori, and Thai were added to 3EA, Persian-Farsi saw its debut on 2EA in 1992, with Dari added to 3EA's schedule the following year.

By 1994 SBS had moved into its current premises in Artamon and had renamed 2EA and 3EA to SBS Radio Sydney and SBS Radio Melbourne. The availability of FM frequencies allowed SBS to double the broadcasting time for both its stations, thus equally dividing broadcast languages into both AM and FM. The World Cup was also broadcast on FM, with the final also heard on the national service. Dari was soon added to SBS Radio Sydney, with Burmese and an African English program also available.

The following year, a now-defunct English program known as "World View" was introduced, in conjunction with the station's 20th anniversary. In 1996, SBS would secure an exclusive scoop on how five Australians were murdered in East Timor, with the network itself soon securing an interview with Nobel Laureate Jose Ramos Horta.

In 1999, in light of the Kosovar crisis in the Balkans, SBS temporarily increased the broadcast times of the Albanian program to cater for the influx of Kosovar refugees who were coming to Australia. In December, fashionista Carla Zampatti replaced Sir Nicholas Shehadie as the SBS Chair. Following 9/11 a noted increase in news production was seen, and programs broadcast in Afghan languages had airtimes increased.

In 2003 SBS underwent a historic review of its radio operations, dropping four languages, Irish Gaelic, Scots Gaelic, Welsh, and Belarusian, while introducing new programs in Amharic, Malay, Nepali, and Somali. At the same time, SBS Radio Melbourne relocated to its current premises in the Alfred Deakin Building in Federation Square.

Ten years later, a similar review was undertaken, introducing programs in Malayalam, Pashto, Swahili, Dinka, Hmong, and Tigrinya.

On 20 November 2017, SBS Radio reorganized its radio service, which included dropping services in twelve languages that either weren't as widely spoken, or had communities who weren't in need of a dedicated service in their language, based on the national census that was conducted by the government the previous year. These languages include Cook Islands Maori, Fijian, Kannada, Norwegian, Swedish, Tongan, the African-centred English program, as well as Danish, Latvian, Lithuanian, Malay, Maori, whose programs were in recess at the time of the reorganisation. Seven new languages were subsequently introduced in podcast form, including Hakha Chin, Karen, Kirundi, Mongolian, Rohingya, Telugu, and Tibetan.

In November 2022, SBS once again reorganised their radio services based on the 2021 national census, intending on dropping the Albanian, Bulgarian, Finnish, Romanian, Slovak, and Slovenian programs, and replacing them with Bislama, Malay, Oromo, and Tetum. SBS also intends to recommit to its Telugu service, while also introducing new content directed at Afrikaans speakers through the Dutch program and new content for Hazaragi speakers through the Dari services.

On 1 March 2023, SBS Radio became a part of SBS Audio.

== Programming and content ==
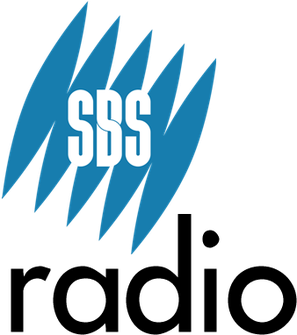
Original SBS Radio logo

Most programs contain a mix of news, current affairs, sport, community information, entertainment and music relating to a specific ethnic or language group. The exception is the English language NITV Radio program, and overnight programming from the BBC World Service and Deutsche Welle. Programs with large communities such as Greek and Mandarin also have talkback segments in the last quarter of the program.

A program is hosted by maximum two hosts, and usually includes a pre-recorded or pre-written Acknowledgment of Country, which acknowledges the land of the studios which the program is broadcasting from. SBS Radio broadcasts programs from either of its Sydney or Melbourne studios. Some programs may be primarily broadcast from one of the two locations owing to historical reasons, for example the Albanian program was primarily broadcast from Melbourne due to being first added to the Melbourne radio schedule (See above for chronology of language additions)

== Radio stations ==
SBS Radio has three main radio services, Radio 1, Radio 2 and Radio 3, as well as a national FM service. Radio 1 is available on AM in Sydney, Melbourne, Canberra and Wollongong (1107, 1224, 1440 and 1485 respectively, and can also be listened to in FM on the SBS Audio app) while Radio 2 is available on FM in Sydney, Melbourne and Canberra (97.7, 93.1 and 105.5) and on AM in Wollongong (1035). Radio 3 is only available on digital platforms. It broadcasts the BBC World Service on all days of the week unless of special circumstances. The national service (branded simply as SBS Radio) is available throughout the rest of the nation through FM broadcasting (except in Newcastle, where it is available on AM) and on the Viewer Access Satellite Television (VAST) satellite service, and is composed of material from Radios 1, 2 and 3. Additionally, a few community stations in areas without dedicated SBS Radio transmitters carry some SBS Radio content.

Radio 1, Radio 2 and Radio 3 are all available nationwide through digital terrestrial television, through DAB+ digital radio in available areas, on satellite from free-to-air Optus D1 and Optus B3 C-band satellite transmissions, and on Foxtel.

Until the launch of Radio 3 in April 2013, programs available on Radio 1 and Radio 2 varied depending on the platform and the location: for example, digital radio and television in Brisbane largely followed scheduling in Sydney, while digital radio and television in Adelaide and Perth largely followed scheduling in Melbourne.

SBS has some additional digital-only services. These are available on digital radio in Sydney, Melbourne, Brisbane, Adelaide, Perth and Canberra; on digital terrestrial TV throughout the country, on VAST, the internet and other platforms. These include:

- SBS Chill, a mix of chillout and chilled world music.
- SBS PopAsia, a mixture of J-pop, K-pop and C-pop, which began broadcasting in 2010.
- SBS South Asian, a mixture of Bhangra, Bollywood music and South Asian pop music in addition with South Asian news and talk programming. It was previously named as SBS PopDesi.
- SBS Radio 3, which began broadcasting on 29 April 2013. Radio 3 was added to Foxtel and Austar on 2 September 2013. It initially included Australian made programming in various languages. As of 2024, it carries SBS language programs from 11AM to 5PM weekdays, with BBC World Service programs at all other times.
- SBS Arabic, a 24-hour Arabic radio station, began broadcasting on 7 March 2016. It broadcast a large quantity of BBC Arabic programming until it became unavailable in January 2023, and was replaced with music programming. It was previously named SBS Arabic24.
- SBS PopEuro, a temporary pop-up station that broadcasts on 30 April-May 31 every year, contains Eurovision hits.
- SBS Radio 4, a radio station that from late July 2026 typically carries the SBS PopLatino service. From its creation until 18 April 2019, SBS Radio 4 carried a few SBS language programs with the rest of the time carrying the BBC World Service. At this time, these language programs moved to SBS Radio 3, leaving the station solely rebroadcasting the BBC until July 2026.

Discontinued digital radio services include:

- SBS PopAraby, which featured Arabic pop music. It is now a programming block on SBS Arabic.
- SBS KickOff, a station that played songs related to the FIFA World Cup 2026 for a month.
- SBS Football 1, 2 and 3, were football radio stations for the FIFA World Cup 2022.
- SBS PopBrazil, was a radio station during the 2018 FIFA World Cup

Slogans previously used include The many voices of one Australia, Six Billion Stories and Counting... and Seven Billion Stories and Counting...; with the current one being A World of Difference.

== Languages ==
As of October 2026, SBS Radio broadcasts in the following languages. All languages are available on the national service unless otherwise noted.

On 20 November 2017, SBS Radio reorganized, dropping of services in twelve languages that either weren't as widely spoken, or had communities who weren't in need of a dedicated service in their language, based on the 2016 census. In those languages' places, however, were seven new languages introduced after the review, but due to lack of airtime, none of these services are available on radio as of October 2026. SBS Radio has re-organized its radio service once again in November 2022, based on the 2021 census.

Broadcast on Radio 1

- English for Indigenous Australians (Note: Broadcast as NITV Radio) (Note: The NITV Radio program is mostly conducted in English and used to be called Aboriginal and Living Black Radio.)
- Albanian
- Amharic
- Armenian (Note: Not available on the national service.)
- Bosnian
- Bulgarian
- Cantonese
- Croatian
- Dinka
- English (Note: Broadcast as SBS World News Radio and during overnight programming)
- Estonian (Note: This program is in recess)
- Finnish
- French
- Greek
- Hebrew (Note: Programs include English segments)
- Hungarian
- Japanese
- Khmer
- Korean
- Macedonian
- Mandarin
- Polish
- Romanian
- Samoan
- Serbian
- Slovenian
- Tigrinya
- Vietnamese
- Yiddish

Broadcast on Radio 2

- The Bollywood Session
- Arabic
- Assyrian
- Bengali
- Burmese
- Czech
- Dari
- Dutch
- Filipino
- German
- Gujarati
- Hindi
- Hmong
- Indonesian
- Italian
- Kurdish
- Lao
- Malayalam
- Maltese
- Nepali
- Pashto
- Persian
- Portuguese
- Punjabi
- Russian
- Sinhala
- Slovak
- Somali
- Spanish
- Swahili
- Tamil
- Thai
- Turkish
- Ukrainian
- Urdu

Distributed via podcast

- Hakha Chin
- Karen
- Kirundi
- Mongolian
- Rohingya
- Telugu
- Tibetan

=== Previous languages ===
- English for Africans
- Belarusian
- Cook Islands Maori
- Danish
- Fijian
- Irish Gaelic
- Kannada
- Latvian
- Lithuanian
- Malay
- Maori
- Norwegian
- Scots Gaelic
- Swedish
- Tongan
- Welsh

Radio 1 also broadcast segments of SBS Chill, either to fill up schedule gaps or to replace a program in recess. A radio version of SBS World News also aired on Radio 1 and currently airs in podcast format.

SBS Radio also broadcasts a variety of languages from BBC World Service and Deutsche Welle, as well as SBS Arabic also broadcasts the BBC Arabic programming.

All languages broadcast on Radio 1 were available (with reduced hours) on the national FM service, as well as all languages on Radio 2, except Dari, Lao and Maltese. None of the languages which were broadcast on Radio 3 were available on analogue radio.

== Technical information ==
=== RDS trial ===
SBS Radio began a trial of RDS (Radio Data System) in Sydney and Melbourne in November 2012. RDS provides "Now" and "Next" information for the current and pending program information. It is now available more broadly.

The RDS PS on FM radio is "SBSRadio" where this service is available.

=== Rollout of EPG ===
SBS began broadcasting the SBS Radio EPG (14 Day) on digital television (DTV) in November 2012.

Data is provided real time for DAB+ clients, and a forward schedule for DTV, by "Aim Rapid 2", from All In Media, see [www.digitalradioplus.com]. Pay television data is delivered by HWW.

=== SBS Radio Operations ===
SBS Radio is managed, monitored and maintained via SBS Radio Operations. Distribution of SBS content is managed by third-parties such as Broadcast Australia and other specialist vendors.

Based in Sydney and Melbourne, the Radio Operations teams within SBS monitor, switch programming sources and co-ordinate resources within SBS to deliver content across all SBS markets.
