= SEN Track =

Australian sports radio network

- Type: Sports radio
- Country: Australia
- Availability: New South Wales, Queensland, Victoria and Western Australia
- Headquarters: South Melbourne, Victoria
- Broadcast area: Australia
- Owner: Pacific Star Network
- Launch date: 28 March 2020; 6 years ago
- Official website: www.sen.com.au/track/
- Language: English
- Replaced: SEN+; Rete Italia

SEN Track is an Australian radio network operated by Sports Entertainment Network, a division of Pacific Star Network. The network launched on 28 March 2020 and broadcasts live coverage of horse, thoroughbred and greyhound racing to nine cities and towns in New South Wales, Queensland, Victoria and Western Australia. It is a sister network to the Melbourne-based 1116 SEN.

== History ==
SEN Track was born out of SEN+, which commenced broadcasting in Melbourne on 13 August 2018. The station was a simulcast of the 1116 SEN service, opting out for coverage of sports including the NFL, VFL, NBL and Super Rugby. The station also broadcast coverage of the 2019 Spring Racing Carnival.

On 3 July 2019, Pacific Star Network announced its subsidiary Crocmedia had acquired 23 broadcasting licences from Gumnut Nominees, the licensee of Italian language radio network Rete Italia, at the value of A$6.25 million.

On 27 March 2020, Crocmedia announced it would launch SEN Track, a radio station covering horse, thoroughbred and greyhound racing. At the time, racing codes were the only Australian sports operating during the COVID-19 pandemic. SEN Track launched the following day in Melbourne, replacing SEN+, and on the former Rete Italia frequencies in Perth and Wollongong. In April, the network expanded to Gosford, Ingham and Atherton, with Crocmedia announcing it would replace Vision Christian Radio in Brisbane and Rete Italia on the Gold Coast from September.

In June 2020, Crocmedia announced it would sell the licence of its Melbourne station to ACE Radio, and seek to acquire a further three narrowcast licences from Gumnut Nominees, covering Melbourne, Sydney and Darwin.

== Programming ==
Networked programming is produced mostly from Crocmedia's studios in South Melbourne. In Melbourne and Perth, the station simulcasts the final hour of Garry & Tim and the first two hours of Whateley from 1116 SEN.

In New South Wales and Queensland, two local programs — Breakfast with Joel and Jimmy and Sportsday Central — are produced from studios in North Sydney. Play-by-play coverage of Friday night National Rugby League matches also air in these markets under the NRL Nation brand, while coverage of Central Coast Mariners A-League matches are broadcast in Gosford.

=== Notable presenters ===
- Gary Belcher (Sportsday Central)
- Joel Caine (Breakfast in New South Wales)
- Garry Lyon (Garry & Tim)
- Scott Sattler (Sportsday Central)
- Jimmy Smith (Breakfast in New South Wales)
- Tim Watson (Garry & Tim)
- Gerard Whateley (Whateley)

== Transmitters ==
New South Wales
Frequency	Broadcast area	Power W	Transmitter coordinates	Notes
801 kHz AM	Gosford	5,000	33.327927°S 151.466578°E	
1539 kHz AM	Sydney	1,000	33.847825°S 151.081389°E	Simulcast on DAB+ digital radio
1575 kHz AM	Wollongong	5,000	34.513668°S 150.879177°E	

Victoria
Frequency	Broadcast area	Power W	Transmitter coordinates	Notes
1593 kHz AM	Melbourne	5,000	37.638547°S 145.01861°E	Simulcast on DAB+ digital radio
Frequency	Broadcast area	ERP W	Transmitter coordinates	Notes
89.1 MHz FM	Mildura	98.4	34.199037°S 142.17253°E	
91.9 MHZ FM	Latrobe Valley	1640	38.240848°S,146.285988°E	

Queensland
Frequency	Broadcast area	Power W	Transmitter coordinates	Notes
1053 kHz AM	Brisbane	500	27.463772°S 153.123747°E	Simulcast on DAB+ digital radio
1620 kHz AM	Gold Coast	400	28.067509°S 153.43404°E	
Frequency	Broadcast area	ERP W	Transmitter coordinates	Notes
96.9 MHz FM	Ingham	492	18.689645°S 146.214773°E	
99.1 MHz FM	Atherton	3,280	17.222963°S 145.447263°E	

Western Australia
Frequency	Broadcast area	Power W	Transmitter coordinates	Notes
657 kHz AM	Perth	2,000	31.795756°S 115.889255°E	
