= Nova 919 =

Radio station in Adelaide, South Australia

Nova 919 (5ADL)
- Adelaide, South Australia; Australia
- Frequency: 91.9 MHz

Programming
- Format: Top 40 (CHR)

Ownership
- Owner: Nova Entertainment; (Nova Entertainment (Adelaide) Pty Ltd)
- Sister stations: FIVEaa

History
- First air date: August 2004
- Call sign meaning: 5 for South Australia plus ADL, the airport code for Adelaide Airport

Technical information
- Licensing authority: ACMA
- ERP: 20 kW
- Transmitter coordinates: 34.97886672°S 138.70854304°E
- Repeaters: Adelaide Foothills: 99.1 MHz, 2 kW ERP

Links
- Public licence information: Profile
- Website: www.novafm.com.au/station/nova919

Nova 919 (call sign 5ADL) is a commercial radio station operating in Adelaide, Australia, owned by Nova Entertainment.

== History ==
In 2003 DMG Radio purchased an FM licence from the Australian Broadcasting Authority for $24 million. Other bidders for the licence included Macquarie Radio, RG Capital, Hot Tomato and Australian Radio Network.

== Announcers ==
- Jodie & Haysey, Weekdays 6 am – 9 am
- Mel Tracina, Weekdays 9 am – 1 pm and Saturdays 10am-2pm
- The Joel Creasey Show, Weekdays 1 pm – 2 pm
- The Chrissie Swan Show, Weekdays 2 pm – 4 pm
- Fitzy & Wippa with Kate Ritchie, Weekdays 4 pm – 6 pm
- Ricki-Lee and Tim, Weekdays 6pm-7pm
- NovaBoy Jamz, Weekdays 7pm-8pm
- Nova 9s, Weeknights 8pm-9pm
- The Maddy Rowe Aus Music Show, Weeknights 9 pm – 12am
- Molly Rose, Saturdays 6am-8am and Sundays 10am-2pm
- Aaron Rich, Saturdays 2pm-6pm
- Jermaine D'Vauz, Sundays 2pm-6pm
- Nova Nation, 6 pm – 12 am (Saturday)
- Jase, Lauren & Clint around Australia, 8am – 10 am [Weekend)
- Jess Mac, 8-10pm [Sunday]
- Nova Nation With Dave Kelly, 8-9pm & 10-11:59pm (Saturday)
