= 89.9 TheLight =

Radio station in Melbourne, Victoria

89.9 TheLight (3TSC)
- Melbourne, Victoria; Australia
- Broadcast area: Melbourne, Victoria
- Frequencies: FM: 89.9 MHz; DAB+: VHF block 9A

Programming
- Language: English
- Format: Contemporary Christian music

Ownership
- Owner: Positive Media Inc.

History
- First air date: 19 December 2001; 24 years ago
- Call sign meaning: Original name of owner, "Triple Seven Communications"

Technical information
- Licensing authority: ACMA
- ERP: FM: 30 kW

Links
- Public licence information: Profile
- Webcast: Web stream
- Website: www.thelight.com.au

89.9 TheLight (call sign 3TSC) is a Christian community radio station in Melbourne, Australia attracting more than a million listeners per month. It broadcasts on the FM band with the frequency of 89.9, on DAB+ digital radio and streams online via website and mobile app. Studios are located at 333 Mitcham Road, in Mitcham with FM transmitter on Mount Dandenong

== History ==
The station's beginnings can be traced to 1977, when Melbourne Christian Radio was founded. It conducted test broadcasts in 1980, 1981, and 1982 as 3MCR before purchasing air time on commercial station 3DB.

89.9 TheLight is run by Positive Media Inc, which was formerly called Triple Seven Communications and 89.9 LightFM and Light Melbourne Inc. They conducted a three-month temporary broadcast in late 2001 and was informed in December of that year that they were successful for one of the four community licences available from the Australian Broadcasting Authority, now the Australian Communications and Media Authority. 89.9 TheLight began full-time permanent broadcasting on Sunday 1 December 2002.

In January 2017 it was announced that 89.9 TheLight reaches over a million people a month.

== Initiatives ==
=== LightNews ===
89.9 TheLight has its own dedicated news service that provides hourly updates throughout the day, and every half an hour during the breakfast (6 am-9 am) program. Previously, 89.9 TheLight had broadcast the Macquarie National News program every hour.

=== Nine News simulcast ===
An exclusive nightly simulcast of Nine News Melbourne at 18:00. Each afternoon, that evening’s newsreader joins 89.9 TheLight for a preview of the stories set to feature in the 6pm bulletin.

=== Careline ===
The 89.9 TheLight Careline is a supportive service for people who would like prayer, an explanation of Christianity, or simply an understanding ear. Callers may also request to be referred to a local church. The Lord Mayor's Charitable Fund assisted with the operating costs of the Careline in 2003, 2004 and 2005. Careline is an independent nationwide service. "'Careline Connections' is a not for profit Company...provided as a Community service to listeners of Christian media across Australia."

== DAB+ Digital radio ==
89.9 TheLight is simulcast on Digital Radio in Melbourne.

TheLight MIX (formerly LightDigital) is an online and DAB+ digital station broadcasting 100% Christian music, and was launched on 1 December 2011.

TheLight Christmas (formerly LightChristmas) broadcasts every year from 1st Of November through to The 5th Of January online and on DAB+ digital radio. In 2014, for the first time, TheLight Christmas appeared as a 'pop up' digital radio station.

== Presenters ==
=== 89.9 TheLight on-air team ===
The presenters of 89.9 TheLight include Lucy Holmes, Kel McWilliam for Breakfast, Shaylee Wieckmann and Rob Anderson for your Drive home, Cam Want during the day with his nationally syndicated show "The Daily", Clayton Bjelan on Sunday Nights, as well as the Nine News Melbourne team

=== Shows ===
89.9 TheLight has many full-time and some part-time announcers employed at the radio station. 89.9 TheLight promotes Lucy & Kel primarily, with spots on air throughout the day. In 2021, Lucy and Kel were featured on a billboard advertising campaign around Melbourne suburbs. Lucy and Kel are the longest running duo on Melbourne radio, celebrating 13 years as a team, having both worked at the station for 18 years. Lucy and Kel have won numerous CMAA awards for Show of the Year.

== Music ==
=== Christian ===
89.9 TheLight plays a wide array of music of both Christian and censored secular music, with references to controversial topics deleted via Light Remixes of secular music. Christian music on the station is generally a mixture of pop, modern rock, and gospel. 89.9 TheLight plays up to 40% Christian music.

=== Mainstream ===
89.9 TheLight generally play a mix of adult contemporary music. This makes up the other 60% of music they play. This quite often results in the station playing songs from the Billboard 100 Adult Contemporary. They also include music from the Top 40 Australia and United States singles charts. However, they still play a variety of pop and Soft rock songs from the 1990s and early 2000s.
