= Nova 93.7 =

Radio station in Perth, Western Australia

Nova 93.7 (6PER)
- Perth, Western Australia; Australia
- Frequency: 93.7 MHz

Programming
- Format: Top 40 (CHR)

Ownership
- Owner: Nova Entertainment (50%); ARN Media (50%); (Nova Entertainment (Perth) Pty Ltd)

History
- First air date: 5 December 2002
- Call sign meaning: 6 for Western Australia plus PER for Perth

Technical information
- Licensing authority: ACMA
- ERP: 40 kW
- Transmitter coordinates: 32.010731°S 116.084519°E

Links
- Public licence information: Profile
- Website: novafm.com.au/station/nova937

Nova 93.7 (call sign: 6PER) is a commercial radio station in Perth, Western Australia. It is jointly owned by Nova Entertainment and ARN Media.

== History ==
In February 2002, Nova Entertainment and ARN Media purchased an FM radio licence from the Australian Broadcasting Authority for A$25 million, equivalent to A$41 in 2022. Nova 93.7 commenced broadcasting at 3 pm on 5 December 2002 with presenter Tim Blackwell, playing the Red Hot Chili Peppers' Can't Stop.

Nova 93.7 is only the second commercial FM radio station in Perth to not have previously been an AM station. The first was ARN's 96fm.

== Controversies ==
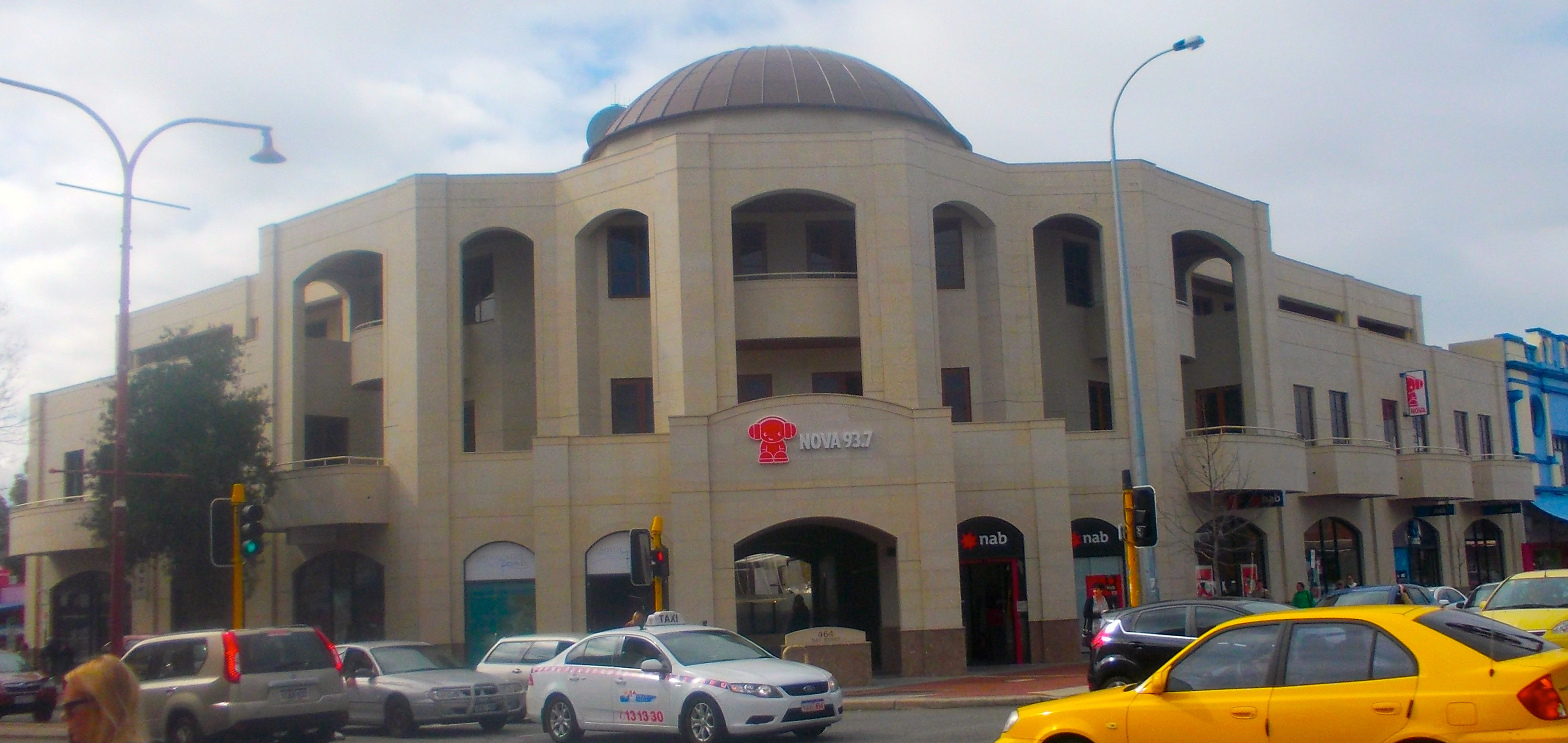
Nova 93.7 headquarters at Rokeby Road, Subiaco

=== Rigged competition ===
In April 2010, announcer Hans Bruechle tipped off his friend Ashlea Reid when he was about to play the secret song. The radio station was alerted to the rigging by a friend of both Reid and Bruechle. Following the incident Nova gave the prize to youth suicide prevention charity Youth Focus and Bruechle was fired.

== Announcers ==
- Nat & Shaun with Joel Creasy (Breakfast) 6:00 am – 9:00 am
- Ross Wallman (Mornings) 9:00 am – 1:00 pm
- The Joel Creasey Show, (Early Afternoons) 1:00 pm – 2:00 pm
- The Chrissie Swan Show (Afternoons) 2:00 pm – 4:00 pm
- Fitzy, Wippa & Kate, (Drive) 4:00 pm – 6:00 pm
- Ricki-Lee & Tim, (Breakfast Reheated) 6:00 pm – 7:00 pm
- The Maddy Rowe Show (Nights) 9:00 pm – 12:00 am
- Nova Nation With Dave Kelly, 8:00 pm – 9:00 pm and 10:00 pm – 11:59 pm (Saturday)
