= Hot Tomato =

Radio station in Gold Coast, Queensland, Australia

102.9 Hot Tomato
Gold Coast, Queensland; Australia
- Broadcast area: Gold Coast RA1 ()
- Frequency: 102.9 MHz FM
- Branding: 102.9 Hot Tomato

Programming
- Language: English
- Format: Adult Contemporary

Ownership
- Owner: ARN; (Hot Tomato Broadcasting Company Pty Ltd)

History
- First air date: 1 August 2003
- Call sign meaning: 4 – Queensland; Hot Tomato Broadcasting

Technical information
- ERP: 25,000 watts
- HAAT: 447 m
- Transmitter coordinates: 27°58′11″S 153°12′48″E

Hot Tomato (call sign: 4HTB) is a radio station (102.9 FM) on the Gold Coast, Queensland, Australia.

The current breakfast show consists of Paul "Galey" Gale and Emily Jade O'Keeffe live from 5 am till 9 am. Olivia Scott and David “Christo” Christopher are live across the workday 9 am - 3 pm. The only live and local drive home on the Gold Coast is hosted by Moyra Major and Big Trevor Butler from 3 pm till 7 pm. The Big Kahuna is live from 7 pm till 10 pm.

A key point of difference between Hot Tomato and the other Gold Coast radio stations is that all shows originate and are broadcast from the local region, there is no networking, the station is 100% Gold Coast made.

Hot Tomato was the first radio station in Queensland to use the limited inventory concept, getting around the Nova trademark by calling it "only ever two ads in a row." This is no longer a viable commercial position and the station now plays more commercials in a row but maintains shorter ad blocks than its competitors.

The first song played on Hot Tomato was The Rolling Stones' "Sympathy for the Devil". In November 2018 Hot Tomato was purchased by Grant Broadcasters.

In November 2021, Hot Tomato, along with other stations owned by Grant Broadcasters, were acquired by the Australian Radio Network. This deal will allow Grant's stations, including Hot Tomato, to access ARN's iHeartRadio platform in regional areas. The deal was finalized on January 4, 2022. It is expected Hot Tomato will integrate with ARN's KIIS Network, but will retain its current name according to the press release from ARN.
