= Nova 106.9 =

Radio station in Brisbane, Australia

Nova 106.9 (4BNE)
- Brisbane, Queensland; Australia
- Frequency: 106.9 MHz (also on DAB+)
- Branding: Nova 106.9

Programming
- Language: English
- Format: Top 40 (CHR)

Ownership
- Owner: Nova Entertainment; (Nova Entertainment (UK Radio 2) Pty Ltd)

History
- First air date: 4 April 2005
- Call sign meaning: 4 for Queensland plus BNE, the airport code for Brisbane Airport

Technical information
- Licensing authority: ACMA
- ERP: 12,000 watts
- HAAT: 289 m
- Transmitter coordinates: 27.464574°S 152.947420°E

Links
- Public licence information: Profile
- Website: www.novafm.com.au/station/nova1069

Nova 106.9 (call sign 4BNE) is a commercial radio station operating in Brisbane, Queensland, Australia, owned by Nova Entertainment. DMG Radio purchased the Brisbane FM licence for $80 million in April 2004 from the Australian Broadcasting Authority to complete its national network of Nova stations. Nova 106.9's studios are located at 130 Commercial Road, Teneriffe.

== History ==
Following the successful bid for the last commercial FM licence to be auctioned for Brisbane in April 2004, on the frequency originally occupied by Ipswich station Q-FM which later changed its name to Star FM, Nova 106.9 – call sign 4BNE – began test transmissions in August 2004. These transmissions featured comedy pieces with a 'personality' by the name of "Bevan - The Work Experience DJ" who is widely rumoured to be comedian Simon Kennedy. Bevan still is a feature in Nova 106.9's programming often hosting infrequent shows at Christmas time and special events. The test broadcasts continued up until the official launch on 4 April 2005 with the breakfast show Meshel, Ash & Kip with Luttsy from a temporary studio in a converted Teneriffe woolstore, while the new studio complex was being completed upstairs in the same building. The new studio complex became operational in February 2006.

Nova 106.9 took over rival B105's sponsorship of the Brisbane Broncos in 2007. In 2007 it became the official FM station for the Rugby League State of Origin series, and a media partner of Brisbane Roar, the Brisbane Lions, the Queensland Bulls and the 2008 Summer Olympics.

In December 2017, Nova announced that it will network Greg Burns from Nova 96.9 as opposed to local announcers. Katie Mattin moved to the afternoon shift with Tim Wong-See leaving the station. In June 2018, local announcers returned to the station with Katie Mattin replacing Greg Burns.

== Announcers ==
- Nick, Luttsy & Susie O’Neill, Weekdays 6 am – 9 am
- Mel Tracina, Weekdays 9 am – 1 pm
- The Joel Creasey Show, Weekdays 1 pm – 2 pm
- The Chrissie Swan Show, Weekdays 2 pm – 4 pm
- Fitzy & Wippa with Kate Ritchie, Weekdays 4 pm – 6 pm
- The Maddy Rowe Show, Weeknights 8 pm – 10 pm
- Nova Nation, 6 pm – 12 am (Saturday)
- Jase, Lauren & Clint around Australia, 6 am – 10 am (Sunday)
- The Maddy Rowe Aus Music Show, 6 pm – 7 pm (Sunday)
- Confidential with J.Mo and Angie Kent, 7 pm – 8 pm (Sunday)
- Nova Nation With Dave Kelly, 8-9pm & 10-11:59pm (Saturday)
