= Nova Entertainment =

Australian radio company

- Industry: Entertainment
- Founded: 1996
- Headquarters: Sydney, Australia
- Parent: Illyria Pty Ltd
- Divisions: Nova; Smooth FM; FIVEAA; Star 104.5; Coles Radio; Priceline Radio
- Website: novaentertainment.com.au

Nova Entertainment is an Australian entertainment company that operates commercial radio networks (and associated digital brands) in metropolitan and regional areas of Australia.

Nova Entertainment is owned by Lachlan Murdoch's Illyria Pty Ltd which purchased the remaining 50% it did not own from Daily Mail & General Trust in September 2012.

== History ==
Nova Entertainment was formed in early 1996 under the name DMG Radio Australia, followed later in the year with the A$46M acquisition of 85% of the Broadcast Media group of regional stations. This was shortly followed by FIVEaa on 26 September 1996. The founding chairman and CEO were Charlie Cox and Paul Thompson respectively.

In September 2004, DMG Radio Australia sold most of its regional radio stations to Macquarie Bank, keeping only Hot 91 Sunshine Coast (later sold in early 2005) and Star 104.5 in Gosford.

On Monday 21 May 2012, after poor ratings, 91.5 FM Melbourne and 95.3 FM Sydney were rebranded again to smoothfm with a new smooth, easy listening format to aim for women aged 35+.

In December 2013, DMG Radio Australia launched a 24-hour Australian pay television music channel, Smooth available via Foxtel satellite and cable services. The pay television music channel extends from the Smooth FM radio brand. It was shut down on 30 June 2020.

In February 2014, DMG Radio Australia rebranded under the name Nova Entertainment to reflect the company's increasingly diversified interests in radio and the media and entertainment industries. The new company name has been developed to encapsulate both the pride and heritage of the company’s original and successful FM launch brand, Nova, with its recent evolution into the broader media and entertainment space.

== Current operations ==
=== Radio ===
Nova Entertainment owns two national radio networks and numerous independent radio stations with a presence across Australia through terrestrial, digital and online.

All stations can be streamed online or via the Nova, Smooth, FIVEAA or Star Player apps.

==== Nova ====
The Nova Network is a commercial radio network with an adult contemporary format. All network stations are owned and operated by Nova Entertainment (with Perth being a JV with ARN) and each FM station has its own local Breakfast show with daytime, drive and night shifts networked across all stations.

Station	Callsign	Frequency	Location	Format	Notes
Nova 96.9	2SYD	96.9 MHz DAB+	Sydney, New South Wales	Top 40 (CHR)	
Nova 100	3MEL	100.3 MHz DAB+	Melbourne, Victoria	Top 40 (CHR)	
Nova 106.9	4BNE	106.9 MHz DAB+	Brisbane, Queensland	Top 40 (CHR)	
Nova 93.7	6PER	93.7 MHz DAB+	Perth, Western Australia	Top 40 (CHR)	Joint venture with ARN Media
Nova 91.9	5ADL	91.9 MHz DAB+	Adelaide, South Australia	Top 40 (CHR)	
Nova Nation	N/A	DAB+	Sydney, Melbourne	Dance radio	
Nova Fresh Country	N/A	DAB+	Brisbane	Country radio	
Nova Throwbacks	N/A	DAB+	Brisbane	Contemporary hit radio	90s and 00s music
Nova Jamz	N/A	DAB+	Adelaide	Rhythmic CHR	

==== smoothfm ====
smoothfm is a commercial radio network originally launched in 2012 as a rebrand of the Classic Rock network. Since 14 February 2020 the network's primary format is Hot-Adult Contemporary providing feel good and dance music.

Station	Callsign	Frequency	Location	Format	Notes
smooth 95.3	2PTV	95.3 MHz DAB+	Sydney, New South Wales	Hot AC	Formerly branded as Vega 95.3 (2005–10) & Classic Rock 95.3 (2010–12)
smooth 91.5	3PTV	91.5 MHz DAB+	Melbourne, Victoria	Hot AC	Formerly branded as Vega 91.5 (2005–10) & Classic Rock 91.5 (2010–12)
smooth Brisbane	N/A	DAB+	Brisbane, Queensland	Hot AC	
smooth Perth	N/A	DAB+	Perth, Western Australia	Hot AC	
smooth Adelaide	N/A	DAB+	Adelaide, South Australia	Hot AC	
smooth Relax	N/A	DAB+	Sydney, Melbourne	Soft Adult Contemporary	
smooth Vintage	N/A	DAB+	Sydney, Melbourne	Oldies	
smooth 80s	N/A	DAB+	Adelaide	1980s music	

==== Non-network radio ====
In addition to its network-based assets, NOVA also operates the following radio stations.

Station	Callsign	Frequency	Location	Format	Notes
Coles Radio	N/A	DAB+	Metro capital cities (DAB+) and all Coles stores	Adult Contemporary	Branded station for Coles Supermarkets
Star 104.5	2GOS	104.5 MHz FM	Central Coast, New South Wales	Top 40 (CHR)	Previously part of the Star FM radio network (now Hit Network)
FIVEAA	5AA	1395 kHz AM DAB+	Adelaide, South Australia	Talk radio	Shares some resources with Nine Radio stations, including news and sport (primarily Australian Rules football).
KIIS 97.3	4BFM	97.3 MHz FM DAB+	Brisbane, Queensland	Top 40 (CHR)	50/50 joint venture with ARN Media
Priceline Radio	N/A	DAB+	Sydney and Melbourne (DAB+) and all Priceline stores	Adult Contemporary	Branded station for Priceline
Sky News Radio	N/A	DAB+	Sydney, Melbourne and Brisbane	News talk	Audio simulcast of Sky News Australia

NOVA Entertainment also rebroadcasts News-owned British station Talksport locally via its website and NOVA Player app.

=== Other ===
- Nova Podcasts, the podcast network suite of Nova Entertainment
- novafm.com.au, online news, music & lifestyle portal
- smooth.com.au, online news, music & lifestyle portal
- fiveaa.com.au, online news portal
- star1045.com.au, online news, music & lifestyle portal

== Former operations ==
=== Foxtel Smooth ===
Foxtel Smooth was an 18-hour pay television music channel (time-shared with Foxtel Arts) available via Foxtel satellite and cable services. It launched on 3 December 2013, dedicated to easy listening adult contemporary music. The channel ceased broadcasting on 30 June 2020.

=== GOAT ===
GOAT was a pop culture, news and entertainment website aimed at a millennial audience. It has been dormant since 2018.

== See also ==
- List of radio stations in Australia
