= Rete Italia =

- Melbourne, Australia; Australia
- Frequencies: AM: 1539 kHz Sydney; AM: 1629 kHz Shepparton; FM: 87.6 MHz Swan Hill; FM: 87.8 MHz Wangaratta; DAB+: 9A Melbourne

Programming
- Language: Italian
- Format: Talk radio
- Affiliations: Il Globo Newspaper

Ownership
- Owner: Italian Media Corporation

Links
- Website: www.reteitalia.com.au

Rete Italia is an Italian-language radio network which broadcast to selected capital cities in Australia. The station is associated with Il Globo Newspaper and La Fiamma newspaper.

The radio network was launched in 1994. Rete Italia is part of Niche Radio Network, which broadcasts multiple languages.

== See also ==
- List of radio stations in Australia
