= Nova (radio network) =

- Australia
- Branding: Nova

Programming
- Language: English
- Format: Top 40 (CHR)
- Affiliations: smoothfm

Ownership
- Owner: Nova Entertainment

History
- First air date: 2001

Technical information
- ERP: Sydney: 150 kW; Melbourne: 56 kW; Brisbane: 12 kW; Adelaide: 20 kW; Perth: 40 kW

Links
- Website: http://www.novafm.com.au/

The Nova Network is a group of Australian radio stations owned wholly or in part by Nova Entertainment. The Perth station is a joint venture between Nova Entertainment and ARN Media.

Each FM station has its own local Breakfast show with workdays, drive, night and weekend shifts shared across the network.

== Stations ==
Callsign	Frequency	Branding	Location
2SYD	96.9 MHz FM	Nova 96.9	Sydney
3MEL	100.3 MHz FM	Nova 100	Melbourne
4BHN	106.9 MHz FM	Nova 106.9	Brisbane
5ADL	91.9 MHz FM	Nova 91.9	Adelaide
6PER	93.7 MHz FM	Nova 93.7	Perth
N/A	DAB+	Nova Nation	Sydney, Melbourne
N/A	DAB+	Nova Fresh Country	Brisbane
N/A	DAB+	Nova Throwbacks	Brisbane
N/A	DAB+	Nova Jamz	Adelaide

== Network shows ==
Nova syndicates a number of programmes across its network. These include:

- Mel Tracina, Weekdays 9 am – 1 pm (except Perth)
- The Joel Creasey Show, Weekdays 1 pm – 2 pm
- The Chrissie Swan Show, Weekdays 2 pm – 4 pm
- Fitzy, Wippa & Kate, Weekdays 4 pm – 6 pm
- Ricki-Lee & Tim, Weekdays 6 pm – 7 pm
- Novaboy’s Jamz, Weeknights 7 pm – 8 pm
- Nova 9s, Weeknights 8 pm – 9 pm
- The Maddy Rowe Show, Weeknights 9 pm – 12 am
- Jase, Lauren & Clint, Saturday and Sunday 8 am – 10 am
- The Jermaine Plane, Saturday 5pm – 6 pm
- Nova Nation, 6pm – 12 am (Saturday) & 10pm - 12am (Friday)
- The Maddy Rowe Aus Music Show, 6 pm – 7 pm (Sunday)
- Confidential on Nova with J.Mo, 7 pm – 8 pm (Sunday)
- Jess and Chae, 8 pm – 10 pm (Sunday)

== Local announcers ==
Nova 96.9 – Sydney:

- Ricki-Lee & Tim, Weekdays 6 am – 9 am

Nova 100 – Melbourne:

- Jase, Lauren & Clint, Weekdays 6 am – 9 am

Nova 106.9 – Brisbane:

- Nick, Luttsy & Susie O'Neill, Weekdays 6 am – 9 am

Nova 91.9 – Adelaide:

- Jodie & Haysey, Weekdays 6 am – 9 am
- Cale Porter, Saturdays 10 am – 2 pm

Nova 93.7 – Perth:

- Joel, Nat & Shaun, Weekdays 6 am – 9 am
- Ross Wallman, Weekdays 9 am – 2 pm

== Nova Player ==
In July 2021, Nova Entertainment introduced the Nova Player app, offering users unlimited access to an extensive array of audio features. From all Nova Stations and Nova FM show podcasts to the latest news, sports updates, financial insights, and a diverse selection of other podcasts

== Nova's Red Room ==
In 2012, Nova Entertainment launched Nova's Red Room on the principle of delivering extraordinary live experiences filled with emotion and personal connection for Nova listeners. Over 300 artists have performed in Nova's Red Room spanning Australia and international locations.

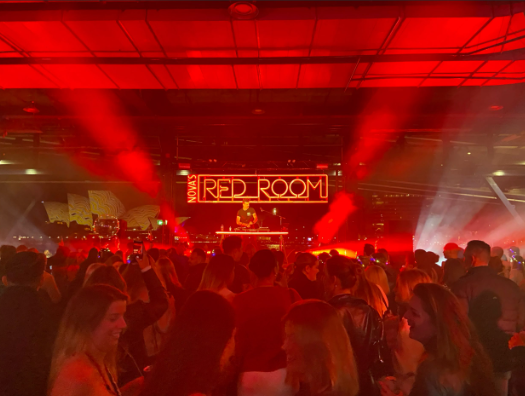
The Nova Red Room in Sydney

== Criticism ==
Nova have received criticism for frequently rotating songs on their playlist. In a piece about the 2020 ARIA Music Awards, NME Australia's Andrew P. Street wrote that the 2004 rollout of Nova FM had "accidentally turned Thirsty Merc and Missy Higgins into stars, before the network swapped to its current format of 14 endlessly repeated songs."
