= The Chrissie Swan Show =

Australian radio show

- Genre: Entertainment
- Running time: 120 minutes
- Country of origin: Australia
- Language: English
- Home station: Nova 100 Melbourne
- Syndicates: All Nova FM Stations
- Hosted by: Chrissie Swan
- Website: www.novaentertainment.com.au/the-chrissie-swan-show-talent-page

The Chrissie Swan Show is an Australian national weekday afternoon radio show, broadcast on Nova FM and hosted by Chrissie Swan with anchor Jack Charles.

== History ==
In October 2022 it was announced that television and radio host Chrissie Swan would host a radio show on Nova FM, planned for broadcast in early 2023. The announcement came after Swan had finished up her previous radio breakfast show Chrissie, Sam & Browny, which she hosted alongside Sam Pang and Jonothan Brown from 2016 to 2022 on Melbourne's Nova 100.

The Chrissie Swan Show was first broadcast on 30 January 2023 at 2:00 pm. It is followed by Fitzy, Wippa & Kate. A podcast of the show is released daily.
