= Fitzy, Wippa & Kate =

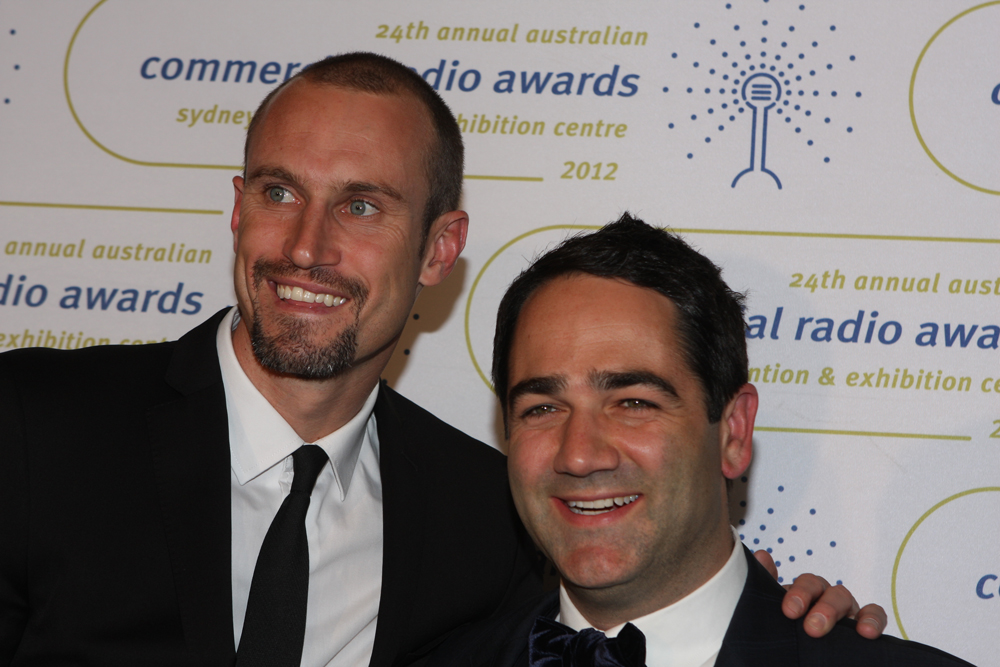
- Genre: Comedy
- Running time: 180 minutes
- Country of origin: Australia
- Language: English
- Home station: Nova 96.9 Sydney; Nova 91.9 Adelaide
- Syndicates: Nova 106.9 Brisbane; Nova 91.9 Adelaide; Nova 93.7 Perth
- Hosted by: Ryan Fitzgerald; Michael Wipfli; Kate Ritchie
- Recording studio: Pyrmont, Sydney, Australia
- Original release: 17 January 2011
- Audio format: Stereo
- Website: Fitzy, Wippa & Kate
- Podcast: iTunes

Fitzy, Wippa & Kate is an Australian radio drive show syndicated on Nova FM stations in Australia. It is hosted by Ryan "Fitzy" Fitzgerald, Michael "Wippa" Wipfli, and Kate Ritchie. The show airs from 4 pm to 6 pm on weekdays with music and daily topic discussions and special guests. A daily podcast featuring the best bits from each show is available on the Nova Player, as is the podcast for all other Nova FM shows in Australia. News, sport, weather, and traffic updates are presented by Ash Gardner.

The show was previously syndicated in the breakfast slot on Sydney's Nova 96.9, with a one hour highlights package airing nationally from 6 pm to 7 pm weeknights, and was known as Fitzy & Wippa with Kate Ritchie. They moved into the drive slot in February 2026, and their Sydney breakfast slot was succeeded by former drive hosts Ricki-Lee & Tim.

== History ==
=== Fitzy & Wippa (2011–2023) ===
The show commenced broadcasting on 17 January 2011, replacing Ryan, Monty and Wippa on the drive shift. Ryan Shelton left Nova to focus on his television career and Katie "Monty" Dimond moved to Sydney to join Merrick Watts and Scott Dooley at Nova 96.9 on the breakfast show.

In August 2011, it was announced that Fitzy & Wippa would move to Nova 96.9 breakfast and replacing Merrick Watts and Scott Dooley. Meshel, Tim and Marty (now Kate, Tim and Marty) took over the national drive show.

Aside from the Nova Network, the show was once syndicated to 38 additional FM stations across Australia, including those operated by Ace Radio and the Grant Broadcasters network, as well as Red FM, Eagle FM and Snow FM. The broadcast time varied from station to station, and the syndicated version was typically condensed into one‑ or two‑hour highlight packages featuring the best moments from the show.

On 27 November 2015, Fitzy and Wippa hosted a one-off special Up Reasonably Late with Fitzy & Wippa on Network Ten. It was watched by 114,000 viewers.

In January 2018, Sarah McGilvray joined the show after previously making regular appearances in her role as Nova 96.9 program director. In October 2019, executive producer Tom Ivey, who also makes on-air contributions as part of the broader team, was officially recognised in promotions.

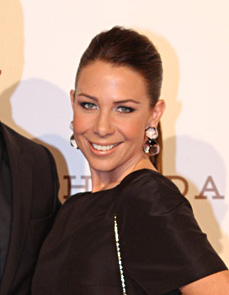
Kate Ritchie joined the show as a co-host in 2023

=== Fitzy, Wippa & Kate (2023–present) ===
In March 2023, it was reported that McGilvray had been dropped from the show. After weeks of speculation, Nova announced that Kate Ritchie would join the show as a permanent co-host from 14 March 2023. The show was subsequently renamed Fitzy & Wippa with Kate Ritchie.

In February 2024, it was announced that Nova 100 Melbourne's breakfast show hosts Ben, Liam & Belle would move to a national timeslot, from 6-8pm weeknights, subsequently replacing Fitzy, Wippa and Kate's national slot.

In January 2026, it was announced that the show would depart Nova 96.9’s Sydney breakfast lineup after 13 years to lead the network’s new national drive program. The rebranded show will be known as Fitzy, Wippa & Kate.
