= Nova Nation =

Australian digital radio station

- Nova Nation logo
- Sydney, Melbourne; Australia
- Broadcast area: Australia
- Frequencies: Internet Radio, DAB+

Programming
- Format: Dance, House music
- Affiliations: Nova Network

Ownership
- Owner: Nova Entertainment

History
- First air date: 16 April 2009 (original); 3 November 2023 (relaunch)
- Last air date: 2016 (original)

Links
- Website: novanation.com.au

Nova Nation (formerly styled as novanation) is a DAB+ and an internet 24/7 dance music radio station, originally launched in 2009.

It was marketed as Australia's first digital dance station in an effort to differentiate itself from analogue stations such as Kiss 90 FM, Wild FM and Fresh 92.7, which were established in 1994, 1996 and 1998 respectively. Fresh 92.7 secured a permanent community licence in 2002. While Kiss 90 missed out on a permanent community licence, some of the Kiss 90 team evolved the concept and created Kiss FM Australia in 2005. Kiss FM Australia is now operating on several low power narrowcast licences across Melbourne and in some regional areas through Orbit FM.

In early 2013, it was removed in Adelaide and Perth and replaced by a DAB+ syndication of smoothfm. It was removed in Sydney, Melbourne and Brisbane as at 24 December 2013 and replaced by Coles Radio, which is fronted by Coles Supermarkets. The station was accessible anywhere online until mid 2016, when it ceased streaming. As of 2023, the Novanation name lives on as a weekend offering on the Nova FM stations.

In October 2023, it was announced that the station will return to the airwaves on 3 November 2023. The relaunched station will be available to stream online, via the national Nova Player app, as well as DAB+ digital radio in Sydney, Melbourne and Brisbane (replacing Nova Noughties). In May 2025, Nova Nation in Brisbane was replaced by country station Nova Fresh Country.
