= Nova 96.9 =

Radio station in Sydney, Australia

Nova 96.9 (2SYD)
- Sydney; Australia
- Frequency: 96.9 MHz

Programming
- Format: Contemporary hit radio

Ownership
- Owner: Nova Entertainment; (Nova 96.9 Pty Ltd)
- Sister stations: Smooth 95.3

History
- First air date: 1 April 2001
- Call sign meaning: Sydney (2 for New South Wales)

Technical information
- Licensing authority: ACMA
- ERP: 150 kW
- Transmitter coordinates: 33°43′43″S 151°11′1″E

Links
- Public licence information: Profile
- Webcast: novafm.com.au/player.aspx?site=Nova969
- Website: www.novafm.com.au/station/nova969

Nova 96.9 (call sign: 2SYD) is a commercial radio station operating in Sydney, Australia owned by Nova Entertainment.

== History ==
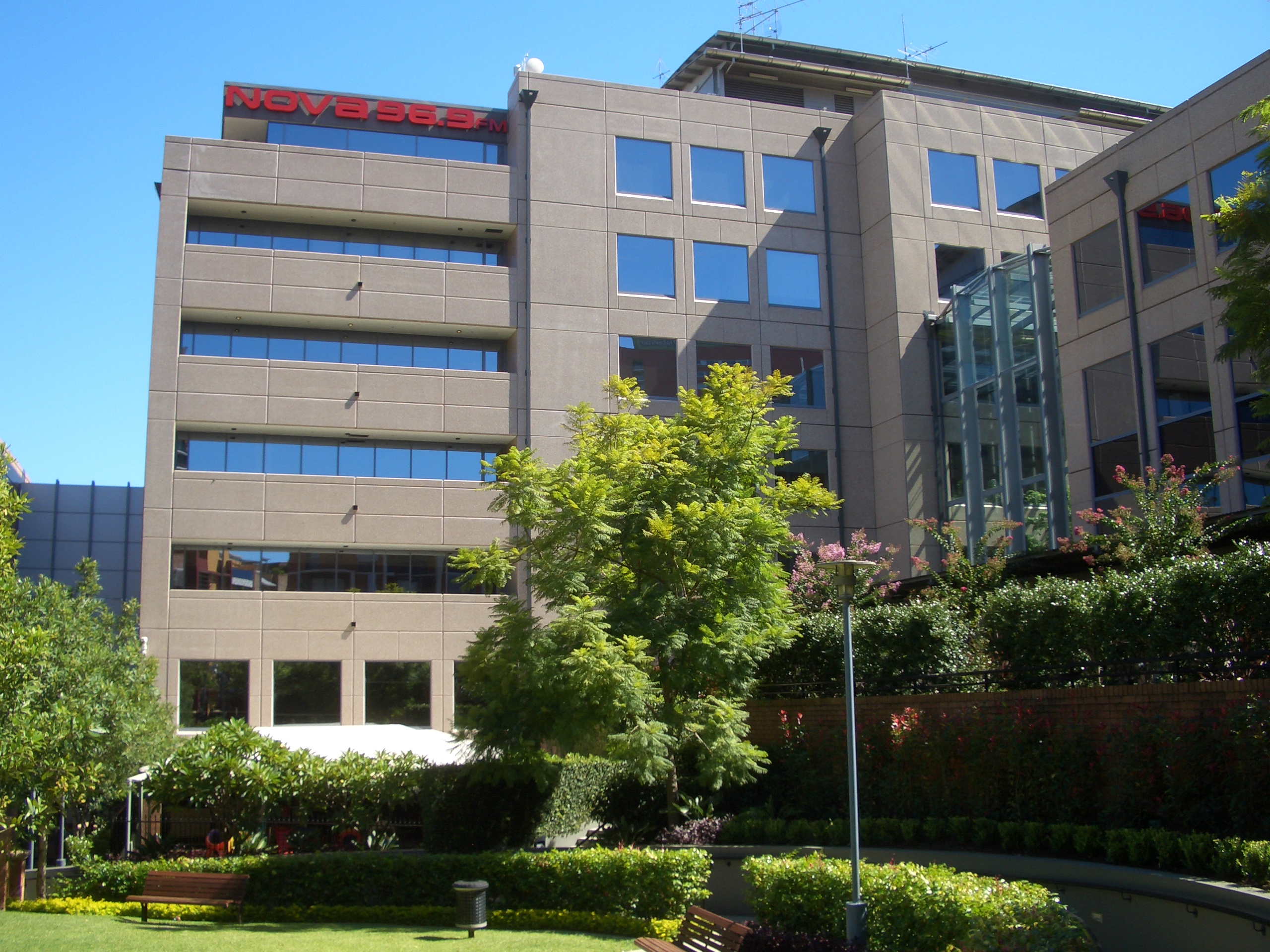
Nova 96.9 studios in Pyrmont

Nova 96.9 commenced broadcasting on 1 April 2001 after DMG Radio purchased an FM licence from the Australian Broadcasting Authority for $155 million. Merrick & Rosso were recruited from Triple J to host breakfast.

Nova 96.9 are major sponsors of A-League club Sydney FC and Australian Football League (AFL) club the Greater Western Sydney Giants.

== Programs ==
=== Weekdays ===
- Ricki-Lee & Tim, 6 am – 9 am
- Mel Tracina, 9 am – 1 pm
- The Joel Creasey Show, 1 pm – 2 pm
- The Chrissie Swan Show, 2 pm – 4 pm
- Fitzy, Wippa & Kate, 4 pm – 6 pm
- The Maddy Rowe Show, 8 pm – 10 pm
- Late Nights with Aaron Rich, 10 pm – 12 am

=== Weekends ===
- Nova Nation, 6 pm – 12 am (Saturday)
- Nova Nation With Dave Kelly, 8-9 pm & 10-11:59 pm (Saturday)
- Jase, Lauren & Clint around Australia, 6 am – 10 am (Sunday)
- The Maddy Rowe Aus Music Show, 6 pm – 7 pm (Sunday)
- Confidential on Nova with J.Mo and Tanya Hennessy, 7 pm – 8 pm (Sunday)
