= 87.6 FM =

FM radio frequency

The following radio stations broadcast on FM frequency 87.6 MHz:

== Australia ==
- Watawieh FM on Norfolk Island, South Pacific
- Raw FM in Canberra, Australian Capital Territory
- 2KY in Cootamundra, New South Wales
- 2KY in Griffith, New South Wales
- 2KY in Young, New South Wales
- Country Mix in Dubbo, New South Wales
- Heartland FM in Mudgee, New South Wales
- Hype FM in Broken Hill, New South Wales
- Indigo FM in Rutherglen, Victoria
- Journey FM in Eden, New South Wales
- Kick 87.6 in Penrith, New South Wales
- Mood FM in Sydney, New South Wales
- Raw FM in Albury, New South Wales
- Raw FM in Goulburn, New South Wales
- Raw FM in Port Macquarie, New South Wales
- Voice of Islam in Lakemba, New South Wales
- Raw FM in Gold Coast, Queensland
- Vision Radio Network in Rockhampton, Queensland
- Vision Radio Network in Charleville, Queensland
- Vision Radio Network in Longreach, Queensland
- Vision Radio Network in Brisbane, Queensland
- Vision Radio Network in Cairns, Queensland
- Vision Radio Network in Kingaroy, Queensland
- Vision Radio Network in Roma, Queensland
- Classic Gold FM in Townsville, Queensland
- FM 876 Network in Melbourne, Victoria
- Kiss FM in Melbourne, Victoria
- Raw FM in Shepparton, Victoria
- Surf FM in Frankston, Victoria
- ValleyFM in Bright, Victoria
- Vision Radio Network in Echuca, Victoria
- Radio Ena in Adelaide, South Australia
- Radio 876 in Normanville, South Australia
- Surf FM in Seaford, Victoria
- Vision Radio Network in Gooseberry Hill, Western Australia
- Wedderburn Visitor Radio in Wedderburn, Victoria

== China ==
- Beijing Wenyi Radio in Beijing
- CNR The Voice of China in Nantong
- CNR Business Radio in Changsha and Yueyang

== Greece ==
- Laikos FM at Thessaloniki

== Indonesia ==
- Hard Rock FM in Jakarta
- Discovery Minang FM in Batam

== Israel ==
- Kan 88 in Arabah, Jerusalem and Safed

== Malaysia ==
- Kool FM in Ipoh, Perak
- Fly FM in Kuantan, Pahang

== Netherlands ==
- Arrow Classic Rock Noord in Enschede, Overijssel
- Radio 4 in Roosendaal, North Brabant

== New Zealand ==
- Various low-power stations up to 1 watt

== Rwanda ==
- Radio10 in Kigali, Rwanda
