= Tom & Olly =

Australian radio comedy duo

- Notable work: Class Captains, Afternoon Breakfast Show, Hit104.9's Tom & Olly

Comedy career
- Years active: 2013–2021
- Medium: Radio
- Website: www.tomandolly.com.au

Tom & Olly is an Australian radio and comedy duo made up of Tom Bainbridge and Oliver Morris. They are currently hosting mid-dawns across the Hit Network.

They began their commercial radio career in January 2015 with the Southern Cross Austereo radio network, working with Hit104.9 The Border in Albury-Wodonga until December 2016, where they left Southern Cross Austereo.

== Radio career ==
Tom & Olly have hosted various radio programs since 2013.

Program Title	Year	Time	Day	Station
Class Captains	2013	15:00–16:00	Tuesday	SYN 90.7
Friends of Tom & Olly	2013	09:00–10:00	Thursday	SYN 90.7
Afternoon Breakfast Show	2014	15:00–16:00	Thursday	SYN 90.7
Spring Radio Carnival	2014	15:00–16:00	Monday	SYN Nation
Tom & Olly	2015–2016	06:00–09:00	Monday–Friday	104.9 Star FM
Tom & Olly Have Questions	2017–2018	19:00–22:00	Monday–Wednesday	Triple M Melbourne; Triple M Sydney
Tom & Olly	2019–2021	10:00–12:00	Monday–Thursday	Hit Network

=== SYN Media ===
While at Melbourne's SYN Media in 2013 and 2014, Tom & Olly hosted several seasonal programs. Their first, Class Captains was nominated for two awards at the 2014 SYN Awards, and the show won Best Seasonal Program. Class Captains was made up of twelve episodes drawing inspiration from various VCE subjects such as English, History, Chemistry and the final exams, however Tom & Olly did advise their listeners that "their advice may not be the best".

‘’Afternoon Breakfast Show’’ was described as a show perfect for the breakfast radio addicts and was the show that saw Tom & Olly launch ‘’The Campaign’’. ‘’The Campaign’’ was an online petition signed by Tom & Olly listeners in an attempt-of-sorts to get the guys on commercial radio. ‘’The Campaign’’ even saw Melbourne’s Gold 104.3 "offer" the guys a job on their station when the receptionist hung up the phone. However the boys were up for a "river change" and chose to begin their commercial career in Albury instead.

Friends of Tom & Olly was a show that was "out to seek the true meaning of friendship" by interviewing a regular listener throughout the course of the hour-long program and Spring Radio Carnival was Tom & Olly's fourth and final program hosted on SYN Media before heading to Star FM for their commercial breakfast program.

=== Star FM ===
Tom & Olly began their commercial radio career in February 2015 at 104.9 Star FM (now hit104.9), with ‘’Star FM’s Tom & Olly’’. The team they replaced had topped the radio ratings last published. Some stunts the show held included a house-warming party for all their listeners, stripping at the Albury premiere of Magic Mike XXL, and setting a panther loose inside the studio. A fairy party was held at McDonald's for Olly's birthday and, trying to rival Spotify, the two set up the Tom & Olly Streaming Service (TOSS). The show has had various regular segments over its time, including "Worst Shirt Wednesday", "Phone-O-Bonanza" and "The O.C. Club". "Domestic Goddess Bainbridge", while not a weekly segment, is the only segment to have lasted since the show's beginning.

Tom & Olly have interviewed a few notable figures on their show, including three-time AFL premiership player & Brownlow Medal recipient Jason Akermanis, former Killing Heidi lead singer Ella Hooper, Hamish & Andy's Andy Lee and Albury mayor Henk van de Venk.

On 19 December 2016, Tom & Olly announced on their Facebook page that it would be their final week on the newly rebranded hit104.9. The duo were replaced by Riley-Rose & Seamus in February 2017.

=== Triple M ===
On 20 February 2017, Tom & Olly commenced a night show on Triple M broadcasting in Sydney and Melbourne.

=== Hit Network ===
In March 2019, it was announced that Tom & Olly would join the Hit Network to host mid-dawns from 1am to 5am from Monday until Thursday.

In November 2021, Tom & Olly announced their resignation from the Hit Network.
