= FM 876 Network =

Melbourne FM Narrowcast Network
Australia
- Broadcast area: Various suburbs in Melbourne
- Frequency: 87.6-88 MHz FM

Programming
- Language: English
- Format: Narrowcasting

Ownership
- Owner: Various

Technical information
- ERP: 1 watt

== The Melbourne Low Power FM Services ==
Melbourne (like most Australian major cities) is home to many broadcasters forming a diverse network of services heard on the frequencies between 87.6 & 88 FM. This said, there is no such thing as the "Melbourne FM Narrowcast Network".

These services vary according to area, and include:

- Melbourne CBD: Kiss FM 87.6
- Frankston & Cranbourne: Surf FM 87.6, Kiss FM 88
- Coburg/Flemington: Middle East Radio 87.6, Kiss FM 87.8
- Epping: Kiss FM 87.8
- Hoppers Crossing (Melbourne Far West): MAC-FM 87.6, Kiss FM 87.8
- Doncaster/Bayswater, Victoria: Radio Jackie 87.6, Kiss FM 87.8
- Geelong/Geelong Outer South-West : Tourist FM 87.6, Kiss FM 87.8

== Licensing and Regulation ==
The services operating on the Low Power Open Narrowcasting system are permitted a maximum of 1 Watt transmitter power (1W pY), AND are limited to a signal strength which must not exceed 48 decibels above one microvolt per metre at 2 km from the nominated site of the transmitter. Additionally the services are required to transmit an omni-directional pattern. (ref: Australian Communications & Media Authority website).

The services are further restricted in that they are required to be "limited" in some way, most commonly limited audience appeal. This is achieved through provision of services in languages other than English, Horse Racing, Local Tourist Information services, or time limited services. The limitation provides these services to be acceptable under the requirements of the Narrowcasting class licence regime, as regulated by the Australian Communications & Media Authority.

== Broadcasting Services Act (Commonwealth of Australia) ==
Open narrowcasting services are broadcasting services whose reception is limited in at least one of a number of ways specified in section 18 of the Broadcasting Services Act 1992:

- by being targeted to special interest groups;
- by being intended for limited locations (e.g. arenas or business premises);
- by being provided during a limited period or to cover a special event;
- because they provide programs of limited appeal;
- or for some other reason.

The above information is sourced from the www.acma.gov.au website
