= America Next =

Conservative political action committee

America Next is a political action committee founded in the United States in 2013. The group would help with founder Bobby Jindal's 2016 presidential campaign before gaining notoriety during the 2026 United States elections by opposing liberal candidates. America Next runs out of Baton Rouge, Louisiana.

== Background ==
America Next was founded by then-governor of Louisiana and chairman of the Republican Governors Association Bobby Jindal in 2013, initially to help conservatives draft proposals for policies such as healthcare for when they returned to power. Jindal said that conservatives were too focused on attacking then-President Barack Obama without providing specifics on what they would do instead, such as repealing the Affordable Care Act; Jindal suggested that the ACA could be replaced by an alternate policy that ensured those with preexisting conditions still got coverage. America Next would then proceed to help with Jindal's failed 2016 presidential campaign by paying OnMessage Inc. for television spots.

=== 2026 campaign ===
After staying dormant following Jindal suspending his presidential campaign in November 2015, America Next would resurface for the 2026 election cycle. The group would give $250,000 to Breakthrough LLC, a firm run by Timmy Teepell (who most notably served as campaign manager to the Jindal presidential campaign), to oppose Michigan senate candidate Abdul El-Sayed via "canvassing and influencer marketing". Timmy's son, Tommy Teepell, would ask El-Sayed if he would disavow the Muslim Brotherhood during a town hall in Caro on October 17. The following five-minute exchange was noted by Hafiz Rashid of The New Republic as having backfired into a "positive clip for his senatorial campaign". A member of the University of Michigan College Republicans, working on behalf of America Next, also offered $200 to individuals to boo and question El-Sayed at a town hall in Flint.

The group's "Full of Hate" television ad, aired most notably during sporting events such as college and professional football games as well as the 2026 World Series, portrayed liberal politicians as "obsessed with race" and "new racists" advocating for white replacement, with a blacked-out white woman saying that she couldn't show her face due the possibility of threats pertaining to the color of her skin. Clips from Representatives Alexandria Ocasio-Cortez and Ilhan Omar, as well as The View co-host Sunny Hostin, were played as part of the ad; Omar's clip suggesting that "our country should be more fearful of white men" came from an 2018 interview before she was elected to Congress. Chris Graham of the Augusta Free Press criticized the ad, pointing out that Jindal was the son of Indian immigrants and saying that the group, which was "hyperfocused" on White America, "is run by a gun who ain’t remotely White".
