= Microtargeting =

Usage of online data for individuals advertising

Microtargeting is the use of online data to tailor advertising messages to individuals, based on the identification of recipients' personal vulnerabilities. Such tactics can be used for promoting a product or a political candidate. Direct marketing data mining techniques that are used often involve predictive market segmentation (aka cluster analysis). Microtargeting's tactics rely on transmitting a tailored message to a subgroup on the basis of unique information about that subgroup.

Microtargeting is increasingly used by political parties and in election campaigns, including Australia, the United States Republican and Democratic political parties, as well as candidates who track individual voters and identify potential supporters. They use various means of communication such as direct mail, phone calls, home visits, television, radio, web advertising, email, and text messaging, among others, to communicate with voters, crafting messages to build support for fundraising, campaign events, volunteering, and eventually to turn them out to the polls on the election day.

Microtargeting can also be used, sometimes by foreign actors, to spread disinformation about political candidates and events among target groups. For example, during the 2016 U.S. election, Russian disinformation campaigns targeted Facebook followers and now-defunct Cambridge Analytica exploited their data. Concerns about the legality and restriction of microtargeting have been raised in both Europe and the United States.

== History ==
Although some of the tactics of microtargeting had been used in California since 1992, it really started to be used nationally only in 2004. In that year, Karl Rove, along with Blaise Hazelwood at the Republican National Committee, used it to reach voters in 18 states that George W. Bush's reelection campaign was not able to reach by other means. The results were greater contacts with likely Bush voters. For example, in Iowa the campaign was able to reach 92% of eventual Bush voters (compared to 50% in 2000) and in Florida it was able to reach 84% (compared to 50% in 2000). Much of this pioneering work was done by Alex Gage and his firm, TargetPoint Consulting.

Also in 2004, Jeff Ballabon, a senior executive at Primedia (now Rent Group), then owner of About.com, independently engaged in a form of microtargeting for the Jewish vote. "According to people familiar with the campaign, he advised the White House on how to reach each of the dozens of distinct Orthodox communities-Syrian and Hungarian, Hasidic and Haredi." Ballabon's efforts also succeeded, with The Forward reporting that Ballabon "basically created a new demographic this election cycle...he helped put his fellow Orthodox Jews on the map as a separate Republican Party constituency. He—or rather, President Bush—was rewarded royally when as many as 80% of Orthodox Jews nationally gave their vote to the GOP ticket."

Democrats did limited microtargeting in 2004, with some crediting microtargeting for Kerry's win in Iowa in 2004. Some news accounts credited Republican superiority in that area for victories in that election cycle. Democrats later developed microtargeting capabilities for the 2006 election cycle. "It's no secret that the other side [Republicans] figured this out a little sooner", said Josh Syrjamaki, director of the Minnesota chapter of America Votes in October 2006. "They've had four to six years' jump on us on this stuff...but we feel like we can start to catch up." In India, firms like EdwardGlobal were first to combine Microtargeting with Geofencing.

From 2010 to 2012, the United States Agency for International Development (USAID) operated the social media network ZunZuneo in Cuba in a microtargeting effort to identify those in support and opposed to the Cuban government so a "Cuban Spring" could be promoted on the platform.

In the 2016 United States presidential election, Cambridge Analytica played a role in first promoting Ted Cruz and, eventually, Donald Trump. However, the claims of Cambridge Analytica's influence, made by its managers, have not been proven, and Cruz's opponent Ben Carson was ultimately unsuccessful even though he, too, involved Cambridge Analytica in his campaign.

== Method ==
Microtargeting is a form of targeting that uses recent technological developments to gather large amounts of online data. The data from people's digital footprints is analysed to create and convey messages that reflect an individual's preferences and personality, as a means of influencing their behaviour. Research has shown that such digital footprints can be used to accurately and unobtrusively predict psychological traits and states of large groups of people. Microtargeting is a modification of a practice used by commercial direct marketers. It would not be possible on a large scale without the development of large and sophisticated databases that contain data about as many voters as possible. The database essentially tracks voter habits in the same ways that companies like Visa track consumer spending habits. The Republican National Committee's database is called Voter Vault. The Democratic National Committee effort is called VoteBuilder. A parallel Democratic effort is being developed by Catalist, a $9 million initiative headed by Harold Ickes, while the leading non-partisan database is offered by Aristotle.

The databases contain specific information about a particular voter (party affiliation, frequency of voting, contributions, volunteerism, etc.) with other activities and habits available from commercial data brokers. For instance, the company Cambridge Analytica added the OCEAN psychological profile (openness, conscientiousness, extraversion, agreeableness, and neuroticism) analysis to other private and public data, and developed the ability to "microtarget" individual consumers or voters with messages most likely to influence their behaviour. For example, a voter with high neuroticism may be more susceptible to fear-based messages. Such personal information is a "product" sold to interested companies. These data are particularly illuminating when portrayed through a geographic information system (GIS), where trends based on location can be mapped alongside dozens or hundreds of other variables. This geographic depiction also makes it ideal for volunteers to visit potential voters (armed with lists in hand, laid out in the shortest route—much like how FedEx and UPS pre-determine delivery routes).

These databases are then mined to identify issues important to each voter and whether that voter is more likely to identify with one party or another. As described by Cambridge Analytica's CEO, their key was to identify people who might be enticed to vote for their client or be discouraged to vote for their opponent. Political information is obviously important here, but consumer preferences can play a role as well. Individual voters are then put into groups on the basis of sophisticated computer modeling. Such groups have names like "Downscale Union Independents", "Tax and Terrorism Moderates", and "Older Suburban Newshounds".

Once a multitude of voting groups is established according to these criteria and their minute political differences, then the tailored messages can be sent via the appropriate means. While political parties and candidates once prepared a single television advertisement for general broadcast nationwide, it is now not at all uncommon to have several dozen variations on the one message, each with a unique and tailored message for that small demographic sliver of the voting public. This is the same for radio advertisement, direct mail, email, as well as stump speeches and fundraising events. Radio advertisement, while often reaching a broader audience, can microtarget using specific timeslots, stations and programmes.

== See also ==
- Data broker
- Geo-fence
- Narrowcasting
- Social media use in politics
