= CityFM =

Radio station in Melbourne, Australia

City FM (Former Melbourne Radio Station)

Australia
- Broadcast area: Melbourne, Victoria
- Frequency: 94.9 MHz FM

Programming
- Format: 80s & 90s Retro

Ownership
- Owner: Central Melbourne FM Inc

CityFM is a former temporary broadcasting station in Melbourne, Australia.

== Brief history ==
City FM in Melbourne Australia was established and developed in Melbourne, Australia to provide for a community-based radio service to the diverse inner-city population of Melbourne; thus it was identified as CityFM.

The station also presented a mix of new music, with club classics - and gained its popularity primarily based on the music mix, however, the radio station offered a number of personalities and a format that was a viable listening alternative to the mainstream commercial broadcasters.

City FM was one of many temporary broadcasters at the time vying for a full-time radio license, that was to be issued to not-for-profit organizations by the Australian Broadcasting Authority.

The first of the temporary radio stations were suburban community radio broadcasting groups, which under the broadcasting legislation in place in the 1980s the then Australian Broadcasting Tribunal permitted up to two weeks of temporary broadcasts per broadcast group with a maximum allocation of 4 weeks per annum. These broadcasts were referred to at that time as "Test Broadcasts", designed to test either facility of readiness to broadcast and audience response to the proposed service being trialed at the time of the test broadcast. The incoming Australian Broadcasting Authority (ABA) was established under the Australian Broadcasting Services Act 1992, and its role was to provide for additional radio services. Part of this role was the extension of the "Test Broadcast" system to allow for more flexibility and therefore providing more options for new community-based groups and narrowcasters to enter broadcasting - something which was not able to occur previously.

One of the effects of this was the establishment of long-period "temporary licenses" for periods of up to 90 days. The first group in Australia to participate in the long term temporary license permitted by the new ABA was HitzFM in Melbourne, Australia (Founded by Anton Vanderlely) in late 1993.

By 2001, there were many temporary community radio stations in Melbourne (and similarly in Sydney) vying for a limited number of full-time licenses, these included: Joy FM, Kiss 90FM, KIX 91.5, Hitz FM, Laugh Radio, Pulse Fm, StreetFM/Street Nation, Employment Access Radio (EAR FM), HotFM Chart Radio, Golden Days Radio - Caulfield, SRA (RIMT University, Melb), 3MU (Monash University, Caulfield), SubFM (La Trobe University, Bundoora), and Kool'N'Deadly (3KND - Preston).

The first of the CityFM temporary broadcasts was established in what was known as the "Tandy Building" in Moorabbin Victoria. The transmitter site was at Casseldon Place on the Melbourne CBD, which provided around 25 km coverage from a 250 Watt FM transmitter through a single folded dipole antenna.

The personalities and announcers on the initial CityFM broadcasts included:

- Anton Vanderlely (founder, manager until end of 4th temp broadcast)
- Gerry Nyein (Breakfast)
- Adam Vaughan
- Glenn Hampson (Nights)
- Paul Thompson (The Slapnutz - Still alive & kicking as of 8th Jan 2026)
- Joel David Fleming (The Slapnutz)
- Kent Richardson (The Slapnutz)
- Arthur Koustas (Midday - 4pm) (deceased 2022)
- Marianthe Esse (News Presenter)
- Chris 'The Ferret' Feretopoulos (Late Night)
- Kat & Jorgia Georgakopoulos aka "The City Sisters"
- Shane Ryan (Mornings)
- Jason Shaw (deceased 2019)
- John Fucci
- Vlad
- Funky Phil Vassallo (weekends)
- Michael Grossbard
- Gerry Burke (deceased 2017)
- James East
- Gary Maddick
- Steve Perry
- Michael Grech
- Kevin Donegan

Some of the names were participants of later temporary broadcasts. Not all were involved in the first breakthrough broadcast.

The first broadcast was technically able within 48 hours from gaining tenancy access at the Moorabbin location. This required all preparatory work to be completed ahead of time, which was the case, and the studios just needed to function – thus were built using old desks, old wall dividers and office panels, milk crates, and borrowed equipment.

The first temporary broadcast was presented over a period of 8 weeks on the frequency 91.5 MHz FM, the station was a great success with rapid audience take-up from the very first day of test broadcasting, till CITY FM ceased test broadcasting operations in 2001.

CityFM operated 3 more temporary broadcasts from its Moorabbin offices before moving to Level 2 - 227 Commercial Road South Yarra/Prahran, where it presented its final four temporary broadcasts.

The broadcast periods were:

- Broadcast 1: 8 weeks (Moorabbin) - (May 1, 1998, to June 30, 1998)
- Broadcast 2: 11 weeks (Moorabbin)
- Broadcast 3: 11 weeks (Moorabbin)
- Broadcast 4: 8 weeks (Moorabbin)
- Broadcast 5: 6 weeks (South Yarra)
- Broadcast 6: 6 weeks (South Yarra)
- Broadcast 7: 2 weeks (South Yarra) - Originally licensed for 4 weeks
- Broadcast 8: 4 weeks (South Yarra)

• Broadcast 7 was cut short following a result of a mid-broadcast AGM election being adverse to the then Committee of Management. The office holders of the outgoing Committee closed down the broadcast and restricted access to the studio facilities. It was this action that was key to the organisation being refused a permanent (long term) broadcasting licence.

CityFM was operated by Central Melbourne FM Incorporated, incorporated under the Associations Incorporation Act 1981 (Victoria), and although it submitted a comprehensive application for a full-time licence - internal divisions and related disruptions to administration (from broadcast 7 onwards), management and licensed temporary broadcast time (Broadcast 7) led to the Australian Broadcasting Authority's (ABA) decision not to issue a licence to City FM on the basis that it did not have the management capacity to operate either a temporary or ongoing broadcasting service. CityFM was in competition for the inner city licence with Joy Melbourne. Joy Melbourne was the successful applicant for the 94.9 FM Inner City licence, which was allocated on 21 December 2001.

In recent times, since the issue of full-time licences in 2001, the organisation (Central Melbourne FM Incorporated) itself has lapsed through nil activity.
