= 2016 Arkansas Republican presidential primary =

- March 1, 2016

40 pledged delegates to the Republican National Convention
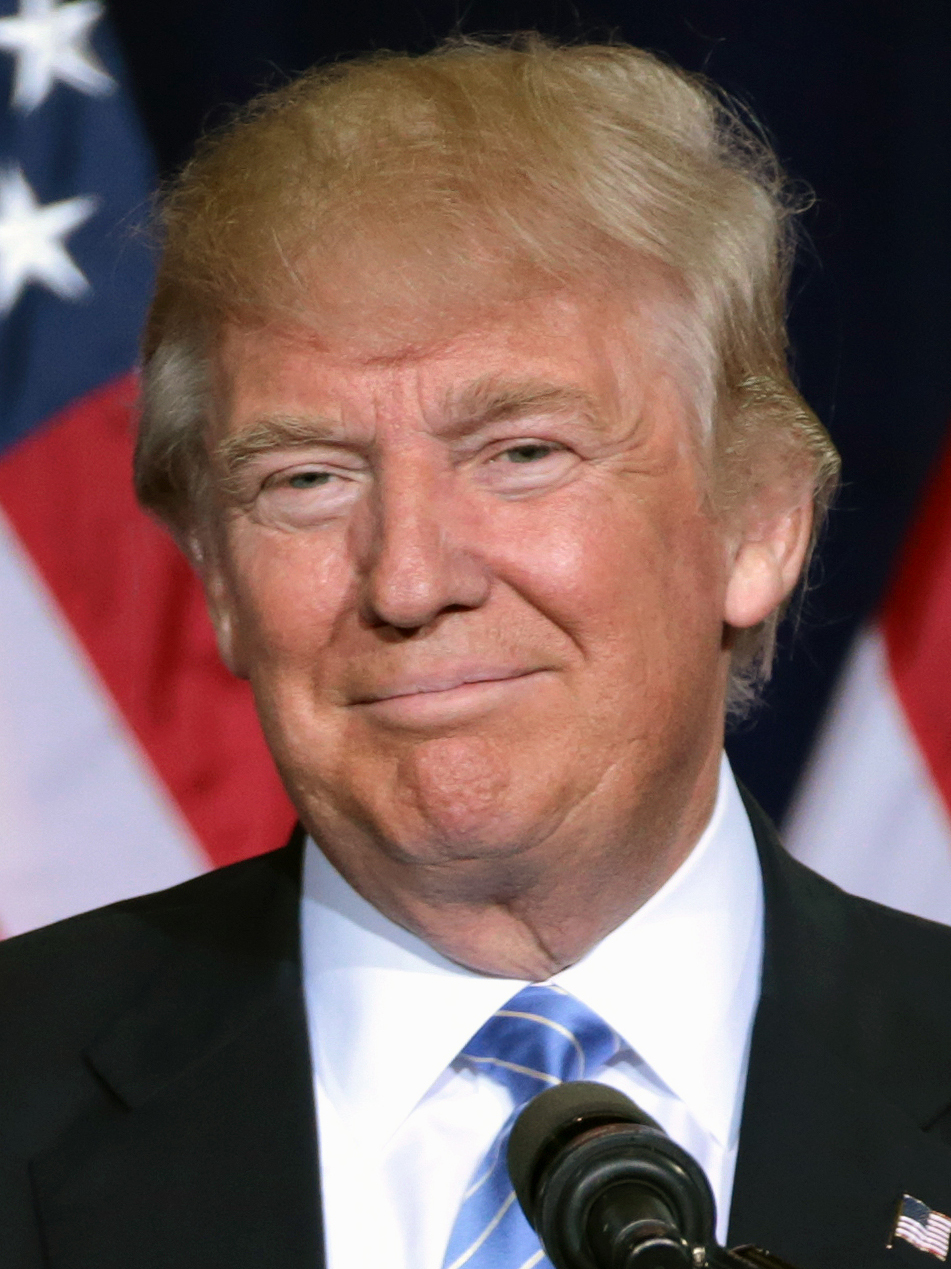

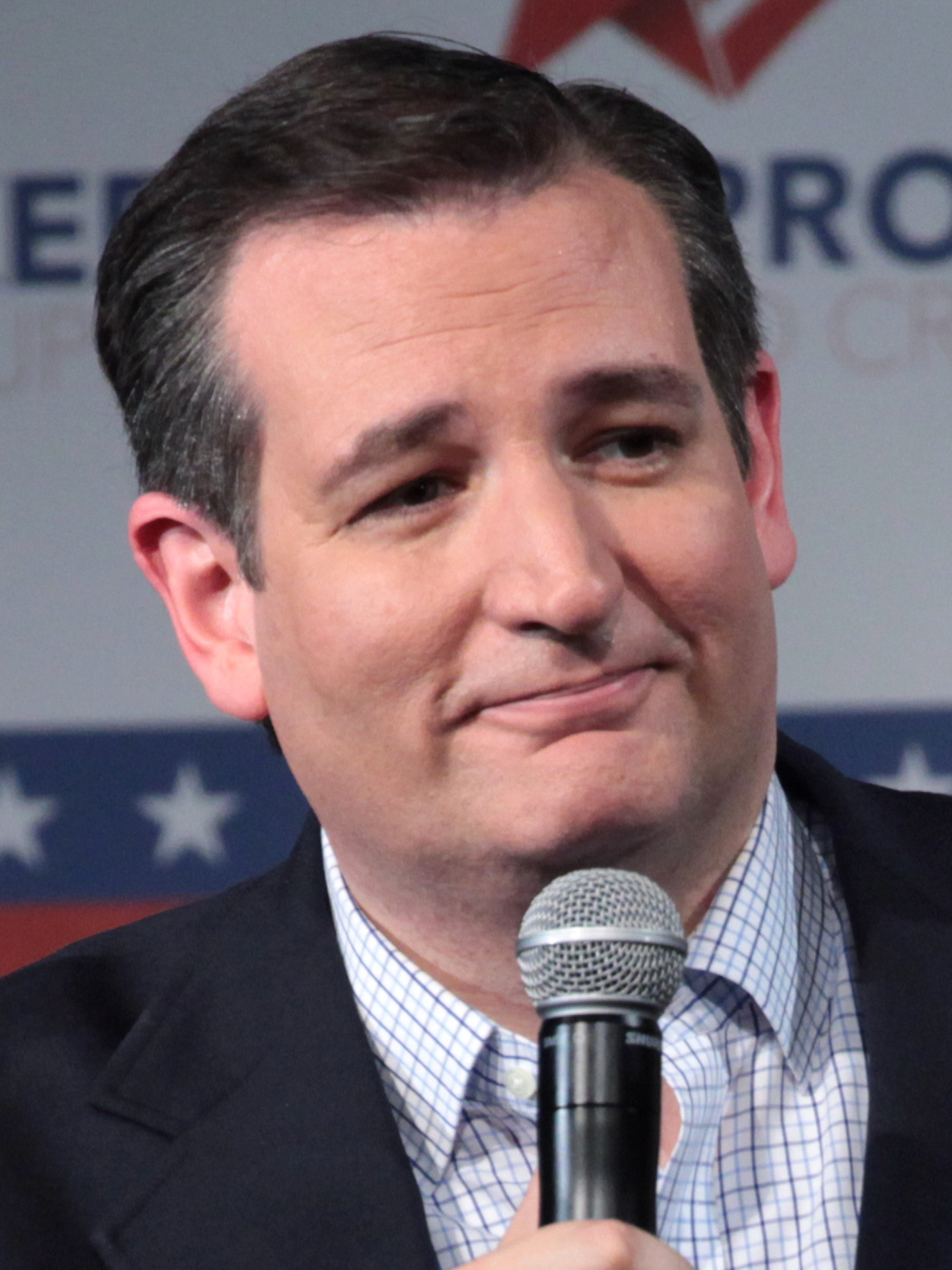

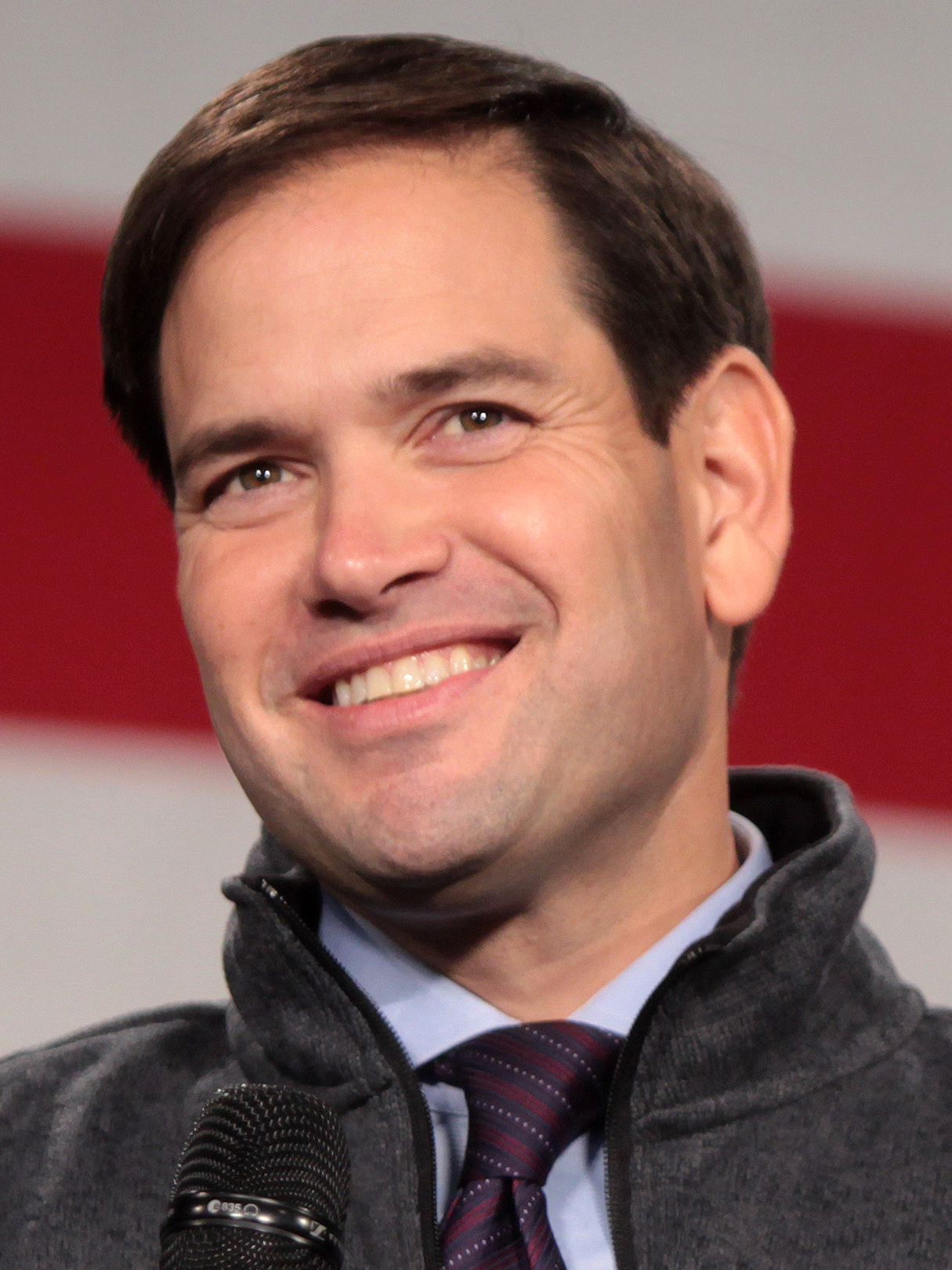

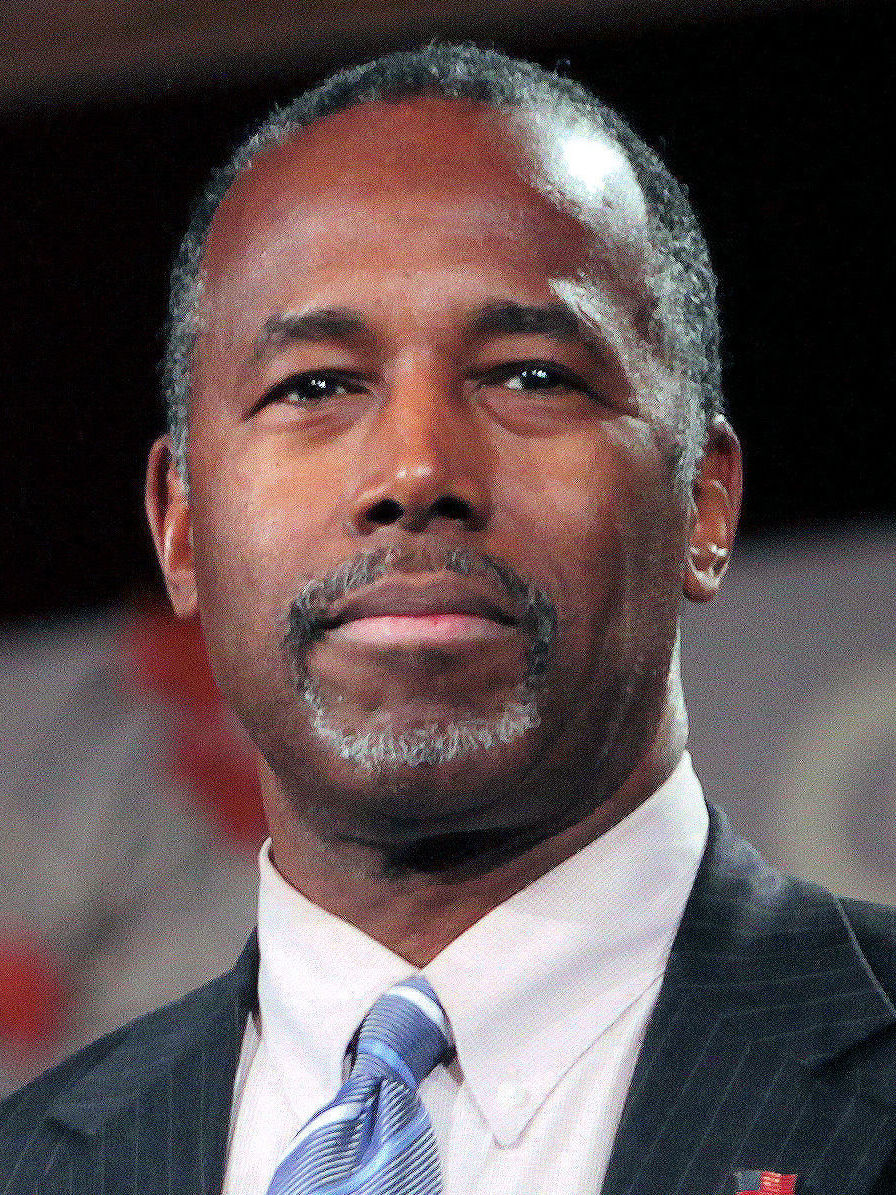
Candidate	Donald Trump	Ted Cruz
Home state	New York	Texas
Delegate count	16	15
Popular vote	134,744	125,340
Percentage	32.79%	30.50%
Candidate	Marco Rubio	Ben Carson
Home state	Florida	Virginia
Delegate count	9	0
Popular vote	101,910	23,521
Percentage	24.80%	5.72%
County results
Donald J. Trump 30–40% 40–50% 50–60%	Ted Cruz 30–40% 40–50%	Marco Rubio 30–40%

The 2016 Arkansas Republican presidential primary was won by Donald Trump with a plurality 32.8% support over Senator Ted Cruz, who competed heavily in Arkansas and hailed from neighboring Texas, with 30.5% support. While Marco Rubio earned the endorsement of Arkansas Governor Asa Hutchinson, Ted Cruz competed aggressively with Trump for the state's Evangelical base.

Twelve candidates appeared on the Republican presidential primary ballot.

== Polling ==
=== Aggregate polls ===
Source of poll aggregation	Dates administered	Dates updated	Marco Rubio Republican	Donald Trump Republican	Ted Cruz Republican	Margin
FiveThirtyEight	until March 1, 2016	March 1, 2016	21.6%	35.1%	28.3%	Trump +6.8

Poll source	Date	1st	2nd	3rd	Other
Primary results	March 1, 2016	Donald Trump32.79%	Ted Cruz30.50%	Marco Rubio24.80%	Ben Carson 5.72%, John Kasich 3.72%, Mike Huckabee 1.17%, Jeb Bush 0.58%, Rand Paul 0.28%, Chris Christie 0.15%, Carly Fiorina 0.10%, Rick Santorum 0.07%, Lindsey Graham 0.06%, Bobby Jindal 0.04%
SurveyMonkey Margin of error: ± ?% Sample size: 542	February 22–29, 2016	Donald J. Trump; 34%	Ted Cruz 27%	Marco Rubio 20%	Ben Carson 8%, John Kasich 4%, Undecided 6%
Talk Business/Hendrix Margin of error: ± ?% Sample size: 457	February 4, 2016	Ted Cruz; 27%	Marco Rubio; 23%	Donald J. Trump; 23%	Ben Carson 11%, Carly Fiorina 4%, John Kasich 4%, Jeb Bush 1%, Chris Christie 1%, Don't Know 6%
Opinion Savvy/Insider Advantage Margin of error: ± 4.7% Sample size: 428	August 2, 2015	Donald J. Trump; 25.5%	Mike Huckabee; 21.4%	Jeb Bush 9.2%	Ted Cruz 8.7%, Ben Carson 8.2%, Scott Walker 4.2%, Rand Paul 3.8%, John Kasich 3.1%, Marco Rubio 2.9%, Chris Christie 2.4%, Rick Perry 1.5%, Carly Fiorina 1.3%, Bobby Jindal 1.3%, Lindsey Graham 0.7%, Rick Santorum 0.3%, George Pataki 0%, Someone else 2.2%, Undecided 3.2%
Suffolk University Margin of error: ± 7.5% Sample size: 171	September 20–23, 2014	Mike Huckabee; 39.27%	Rick Perry 8.38%	Ted Cruz 7.33%	Rand Paul 6.28%, Jeb Bush 4.71%, Chris Christie 4.71%, Marco Rubio 4.71%, Paul Ryan 3.14%, Bobby Jindal 2.62%, Rick Santorum 2.09%, Jon Huntsman Jr. 1.57%, Scott Walker 1.57%, John Kasich 1.05%, Other 2.09%, Undecided 10.47%
Suffolk University Margin of error: ± 7.5% Sample size: 171	September 20–23, 2014	Mitt Romney; 32.75%	Mike Huckabee; 29.24%	Ted Cruz 6.43%	Rick Perry 6.43%, Chris Christie 2.92%, Rand Paul 2.92%, Paul Ryan 2.34%, Jon Huntsman Jr. 1.75%, Marco Rubio 1.75%, Jeb Bush 1.17%, Rick Santorum 0.58%, Scott Walker 0.58%, Bobby Jindal 0%, John Kasich 0% Undecided 11.11%
Public Policy Polling Margin of error: ± 4.5% Sample size: 479	August 1–3, 2014	Mike Huckabee; 33%	Ted Cruz 12%	Jeb Bush 10%	Chris Christie 8%, Rand Paul 7%, Scott Walker 6%, Bobby Jindal 5%, Marco Rubio 4%, Paul Ryan 3%, Someone else/Not sure 11%
Public Policy Polling Margin of error: ± 5.4% Sample size: 342	April 25–27, 2014	Mike Huckabee; 38%	Ted Cruz 14%	Rand Paul 13%	Jeb Bush 10%, Chris Christie 4%, Bobby Jindal 3%, Marco Rubio 3%, Paul Ryan 3%, Cliven Bundy 2%, Someone else/Not sure 10%
Magellan Strategies Margin of error: ± 3.35% Sample size: 857	April 14–15, 2014	Mike Huckabee; 57%	Rand Paul 9%	Jeb Bush 8%	Chris Christie 6%, Ted Cruz 6%, Marco Rubio 5%, John Kasich 2%, Scott Walker 1%, Undecided 7%

== Results ==
Arkansas Republican primary, March 1, 2016
Candidate	Votes	Percentage	Actual delegate count		
Candidate	Votes	Percentage	Bound	Unbound	Total
Donald Trump	134,744	32.79%	16	0	16
Ted Cruz	125,340	30.50%	15	0	15
Marco Rubio	101,910	24.80%	9	0	9
Ben Carson	23,521	5.72%	0	0	0
John Kasich	15,305	3.72%	0	0	0
Mike Huckabee (withdrawn)	4,792	1.17%	0	0	0
Jeb Bush (withdrawn)	2,402	0.58%	0	0	0
Rand Paul (withdrawn)	1,151	0.28%	0	0	0
Chris Christie (withdrawn)	631	0.15%	0	0	0
Carly Fiorina (withdrawn)	411	0.10%	0	0	0
Rick Santorum (withdrawn)	292	0.07%	0	0	0
Lindsey Graham (withdrawn)	252	0.06%	0	0	0
Bobby Jindal (withdrawn)	169	0.04%	0	0	0
Unprojected delegates:			0	0	0
Total:	410,920	100.00%	40	0	40
Source: The Green Papers

== Analysis ==
According to exit polls by Edison Research, Donald J. Trump carried 39% of non-college Republican voters in Arkansas. Trump also won with 39% of veterans, a key demographic for Republican candidates in the South. Cruz and Trump split Evangelical voters with 33% each, which gave way to a close statewide result in the primary.

Many pundits were perplexed by Trump's dominance among culturally conservative Southern whites who were expected to view him as immoral, but he benefitted from voters' racial, cultural, and economic angst that mattered more than shared values.

The week before the primary, Sarah Huckabee Sanders, daughter of former Arkansas Governor Mike Huckabee, joined Donald J. Trump's campaign.

== See also ==
- 2016 Arkansas Democratic presidential primary
