= SYN (radio station) =

Radio station in Melbourne, Victoria

SYN (3SYN)

Melbourne, Victoria; Australia
- Broadcast area: Melbourne RA1
- Frequencies: FM: 90.7 MHz; DAB+: 9B

Programming
- Language: English
- Format: Student radio
- Affiliations: Community Broadcasting Association of Australia

Ownership
- Owner: SYN Media; (Student Youth Network Inc.)

History
- First air date: 28 January 2003
- Call sign meaning: 3 for Victoria plus SYN for Student Youth Network

Technical information
- Licensing authority: ACMA
- ERP: 35,000 watts

Links
- Public licence information: Profile
- Webcast: Web stream
- Website: SYN 90.7

SYN /sɪn/ (ACMA callsign: 3SYN) is an Australian community radio station broadcasting to Melbourne, Victoria. First broadcast in January 2003, the station is operated by SYN Media under a youth license, with programming presented entirely by volunteers aged 12–25 years old. The station broadcasts from studios on the campus of RMIT University, with additional content syndicated from other community radio stations in Australia.

Between 2014 and 2019, SYN Media operated a secondary station – SYN Nation – broadcast on DAB+ digital radio in Melbourne. On 16 April 2019, SYN Media announced the two stations would merge to create a single station, broadcasting on 90.7FM and DAB+ digital radio. The newly merged SYN commenced broadcasting on 22 April 2019.

== History ==
SYN first launched at 12pm on 28 January 2003 as SYN FM, following a successful application to the then-Australian Broadcasting Authority for a community radio FM license in 2001. This followed the amalgamation of 3TD at Thornbury Darebin College and the Student Radio Association based at RMIT University into SYN Media in 2000.

In May 2004, the Australian Broadcasting Authority removed a power restriction on the station's signal, which was in place to avoid interference from the ABNT television service broadcasting from Launceston, Tasmania on VHF channel 3. The restriction also applied to 89.9 LightFM and the then-unallocated smoothfm 91.5.

On 14 April 2011, the station launched on DAB+ digital radio, alongside fellow community broadcasters 3CR, 3KND, 3MBS, 3RRR, 3ZZZ, 89.9 LightFM, PBS 106.7FM and Vision Australia Radio. This saw the station rebrand as SYN Radio.

On 7 May 2013, the station ceased transmitting on both FM and DAB+ for 24 hours in protest of funding cuts to the community radio sector in the 2013 Australian federal budget. This formed part of a larger call to action "Commit to Community Radio" by industry body the Community Broadcasting Association of Australia, as well as the Community Broadcasting Foundation.

On 1 April 2014, the station ceased broadcasting on DAB+ digital radio, and was replaced with a digital radio-only sister station SYN Nation. Following an organisation-wide rebrand, SYN Radio was rebranded as SYN 90.7, emphasising content made by young people in Melbourne. On 22 April 2019 the station was again rebranded as SYN, as the station became available on DAB+ digital radio once again.

Today, SYN operates on a schedule updated with new presenters – all under the age of 26 – and programming every 12 weeks, across two tiers of programming: flagship shows and seasonal shows. Flagship shows operate year round in fixed timeslots under the management of an executive producer, a role rotated yearly, while seasonal shows air for up to six months at a time, and cover a variety of topics and music.

== Programming ==
=== Current flagships ===
- Fresh Sounds (Music playlist)
- Get Cereal (Breakfast programme)
- The Sports Desk (Sports talk)
- Panorama (Current affairs)
- Art Smitten (Arts and Culture show)
- The Naughty Rude Show (Sex and relationships)
- In Joke Tonight (Comedy)
- Graveyard Shift (Overnight programme)

Music flagships

- The Hoist (Australian music)
- New & Approved (New music)
- Sunday Sweets ("Sweet 16" and feature albums)

Genre flagships

- Asian Pop Nation (Asian pop music)
- Hip Hop Night (Hip hop music)
- Moshpit (Punk and heavy metal music)

Access flagships

- Amplify (under-18 drive programme)
- The Awkward Stage (under-18 on-air training programme)
- Schools on Air (high school students, managed by SYN Media Learning)
- Raise the Platform (disability advocacy)

=== Regional syndication ===
In addition to programming produced in Melbourne, a number of shows presented by young people across Australia are syndicated on SYN as part of the SYN Nation project. Current affiliates include 2BOB, Gippsland FM, Woroni Radio, Wangki Radio and Radio Fremantle.

== See also ==
- SYN Media
- Community radio
- College radio
