= Blaise Hazelwood =

American political strategist and consultant

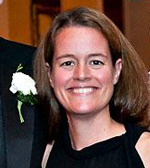
- Hazelwood in 2011
- Born: United States
- Occupation: Political consultant
- Political party: Republican
- Spouse: Dan Hazelwood

Blaise Hazelwood, an American Republican strategist and consultant in the United States, is the owner of Grassroots Targeting, LLC, a microtargeting company.

Hazelwood first came to prominence as the driver behind the “72-Hour Task Force” in 2001, the party’s last major revision to its tactical campaign playbook which is credited with revolutionizing the Get Out the Vote efforts. Hazelwood has led and managed political operations, high-profile grassroots programs and political campaigns, including multiple winning campaigns for chairman of the Republican National Committee. She received praise for her work as Political Director at the Republican National Committee in 2002 and 2004, spearheading their online Team Leader program and the construction of Voter Vault, the RNC’s voter file database. She went on to serve as the director of media and political operations for the National Republican Senatorial Committee during the 2006 cycle under Senator Elizabeth Dole. In 2008, Hazelwood managed Michael Steele's successful campaign for Chairman of the Republican National Committee. Hazelwood followed the new Chairman to the RNC and served as his chief of staff through the transition until March 2009. She then returned full-time to her company in Alexandria, Virginia but continued consulting as a top advisor to Chairman Steele and the RNC until she left in mid-2010.

== Early life ==
Hazelwood is a fifth-generation Arizonan whose grandfather was close to former senator Barry M. Goldwater. She was president of Teen Republicans in Arizona as well as an intern on Capitol Hill and at the White House.

Despite her Arizona lineage, however, she was born in Washington because her father was working at the Interior Department during the Nixon administration. She was named for St. Blaise. The name was chosen by her mother, who wrote a dissertation on the Roman Catholic saint while studying for a doctorate in early Christian art at Georgetown University. Hazelwood has admitted that being named after a little-known male saint caused confusion when she was younger.

=== Arizona Campaigning ===
Hazelwood began door-to-door canvassing as a 10-year-old in Arizona when her father was running for Precinct Committeeman, and she learned firsthand the value of human contact, meticulous organization and volunteer muscle in political campaigns. Her grandmother was a campaign volunteer in the days before computers, when voter files were kept on index cards. She told the Washington Post in 2003, "I always heard stories about my grandmother. It was all personal contact, and it obviously worked."

== Career ==
=== Early career ===
After graduation from Vassar College, Hazelwood's first job was staff assistant at the RNC. Her career since has been a succession of campaigns and grassroots organizing across the country, often anchored by positions at the Republican National Committee. She worked for Bob Dole's 1996 presidential campaign and for James S. Gilmore III's successful 1997 gubernatorial campaign in Virginia.

After those campaigns, she joined Curt Anderson's political consulting firm. Then, in the summer of 2001, moved back to the RNC to help the Bush team manage its outreach to parts of the conservative coalition.

=== Grassroots Targeting ===
The 72 Hour test results were the inspiration for Grassroots Targeting (GT) in 2005 by Hazelwood, turning her expertise in the practice of microtargeting into a business. There was the dire need to have better voter lists and an understanding of how to motivate and persuade individual voters. Blaise has modeled every precinct in the country, in addition, Grassroots Targeting has conducted microtargeting projects and consulted for Presidential campaigns, U.S. Senators and Congressional members, National and State Parties, IEs, and local campaigns.

Grassroots Targeting utilizes proprietary prescriptive voter data, analytics, and modeling, with its modeling and voter scoring programs developed in-house. The system is based on historical campaign data and targets voters with granular data. The modeling process incorporates continuous, systematic testing to improve its algorithms.

Since 2005, GT's in-house modeling program has consistently proven to be extremely accurate when comparing the models to actual turnout and election results. The precision of their models allows clients to avoid surprises and affect outcomes. Their history in highly contested races shows their results are their commitment to winning.

GT conducts quantitative voter research, using prescriptive political analytics to identify and score every individual voter, determining the persuasive messages that will make the most impact.

With respect to the 2008 Presidential race, Hazelwood explained,

"With Bush, our targeting efforts focused on turning out the base. Now with McCain, it's about convincing the swing voters. It's a different audience we're going after, and we're able to find those swing universes much better than we would have in the past. But sometimes microtargeting isn't user-friendly enough -- a lot of campaigns get a book that explains it, and then that book goes on the shelf. I've built software that allows campaigns to understand their microtargeting data more easily. They can pull their own email and phone universes. The software will tell you, 'These are the swing groups, these are the people who are most likely to turn out.' All the end users have to do is pick what groups they want to target. If you have the budget to mail to only 40,000 people, you can decide which group you want and enter into the calculator exactly what you want your numbers to be."

=== Republican National Committee ===
"Blaise Hazelwood is credited with bringing back the culture of grassroots campaigns into the Republican Party."

Hazelwood worked as Political Director at the RNC in 2002 and 2004. Matthew Dowd, Senior Advisor at the time said, "She's got good intuition, and she's exceptionally well organized. She'll do whatever it takes to get the job finished. She's not concerned about being the last person to leave the office or getting on an airplane to get the job done."

==== 72 Hour Program ====
"When the history of the Republican Party's midterm election victories of 2002 is written, President Bush will get the headline and much of the credit, but a large footnote will go to a young political operative named Blaise Hazelwood." -The Washington Post, 2003

Hazelwood, only 31 at the time, was serving as political director of the Republican National Committee (RNC), and it was her responsibility to coordinate the party's "72-Hour Program," an 18-month effort designed to put shoe leather back into politics and beat the Democrats in turning out the vote, especially in the final three days, 72 hours, of the campaign. The 72-Hour Project was born of necessity after the 2000 election, when Republicans discovered that Democrats had done a better job of getting their voters to the polls in one of the tightest presidential races in history.

With prodding from White House senior adviser Karl Rove, White House political director Ken Mehlman and RNC Deputy Chairman Jack Oliver, the party undertook a top-to-bottom review of its get-out-the-vote operation, poured more than $1 million into more than 50 experiments to test how best to reach out to voters and then methodically set about implementing their findings in the midterm campaigns.

"I'm confident from the testing and from human life experience that making a volunteer telephone call or knocking on someone's door makes much more impact than just doing it paid," Hazelwood said.

Her work paid big dividends on Election Day, when a surge of Republican voters in states such as Florida, Georgia, North Carolina and Missouri overwhelmed the Democrats and turned what many had called one of the most competitive midterm campaigns in history into a substantial Republican victory.

==== Voter Vault ====
In addition to implementing the 72 hour program, Hazelwood is also credited with creating Voter Vault, the Republican Party's voter file database which is used by campaigns all over the country.

=== National Republican Senatorial Committee ===
In 2005, Hazelwood moved over to become Elizabeth Dole's right-hand-woman, serving as campaign and media director for the National Republican Senatorial Committee (NRSC) through the 2006 election cycle.
