= Vintage FM =

- Penrith & Camden; Australia
- Frequencies: 88.7FM and 87.8

History
- First air date: 1 January 2009

Links
- Website: Official website

Vintage FM is a low-powered open narrowcast radio station based in Western Sydney.

Vintage FM broadcasts on 87.8 MHz in Penrith and Hawkesbury regions and 88.7 MHz in the Camden and Wollondilly regions. The station plays a mix of music from the 1960s, 70s and early 80s - music released 40+ years ago.

The station commenced broadcasting in Penrith on 1 January 2009. The station has also previously broadcast into the Blue Mountains & Southern Highlands as well as the VAST network - these have all since ceased.

== Airstaff ==
The current on-air team includes Kevin Graham, John Bond (ex 2WS), Wayne Wilmington and Brian Campbell (ex ARN Technical). The station also broadcasts Artie Stevens "50 Year Flashback" and often broadcasts feature weekends - 60s, 70s, One Hit Wonders and Time Warp Weekend. A popular segment each weekday morning, "9 O'Clock Coffee Break" features songs revolving around a common theme.

== Former Announcers ==
Former announcers include Grizzly Adams (now 2YOU Tamworth), Ross Hutchison, Terry Diomis, Graham Webb, Ian Macrae, Nicki Gillis, Malama Psaranios, Josh Haizer (now Capital Radio Network), David Archer (now C91.3), Jason Bouman, Kerry Denten and Glenn A Baker. Stacey Lee (now 5AA Adelaide) also began her radio career at Vintage FM.
