= Surf FM =

Seaford, Victoria; Australia
- Broadcast area: City of Frankston and City of Casey
- Frequency: 87.6 MHz
- Branding: Surf FM

Programming
- Format: Hot AC

Ownership
- Owner: Ian Wood & Justin Christie

History
- First air date: 1 October 2001

Technical information
- Class: Narrowcast
- Repeaters: 87.6 MHz Berwick; 87.6 MHz Cranbourne; 87.6 MHz Doveton

Links
- Website: surffm.com.au

Surf FM is a narrowcast radio station broadcasting to the City of Frankston and City of Casey in Melbourne's outer south east. The station broadcasts a Hot adult contemporary format on 87.6FM from low-powered transmitters in Seaford, Cranbourne, Berwick and Doveton. and in 2022 Hobart, Tasmania

== History ==
Surf FM first switched on its Frankston transmitter on 1 October 2001. The name Surf FM was chosen to identify as closely as possible with being located in a bayside city. It was also selected to distinguish the brand from other names used by various coastal radio stations across Australia, such as Sea FM, Bay FM, Wave FM and Coast FM. Soon after the station commenced, some live programming launched, presented by a team of young adults programming a youth-oriented dance music format.

The team disbanded by mid-2003 and Surf FM experienced a quiet period when it was not always on the air. Activity was revived in 2005, when national dance network Raw FM installed a satellite dish on the roof of the Surf FM studios to coincide with a national tour of outside beach broadcasts. For a period of time Surf FM would relay Raw FM's programming to make use of the satellite feed and fill airtime.

In August 2007, Cranbourne resident Ian Wood joined Frankston resident Justin Christie as a co-owner of the radio station and soon after a second licence was purchased. It took about 14 months to secure transmitter site approvals and install broadcast equipment at the new site in Cranbourne. Surf FM relaunched as a networked radio station on 16 December 2008 when it switched on its Cranbourne transmitter.

In the same year, Surf FM's music format was in a "holding pattern", broadcasting only 1960s’ and 1970s’ music as a novelty tribute to the defunct Melbourne commercial radio brand 3TT which had first gone to air approximately 20 years earlier. During a 9-month period, Surf FM limited its music to compacts discs and music charts specifically issued by 3TT between 1988 and 1989.

Within weeks of launching into Cranbourne, Surf FM changed course and adopted a more contemporary music format. Soon after a syndicated news service including hourly news bulletins was added to the format. During this period of Surf FM's life – between 2009 and 2012 – the station gained substantial experience with live outside broadcasts, making use of internet enabled technologies not as widely available as when the station first aired in 2001.

On 15 December 2011 Surf FM switched on a third transmitter in Berwick to provide improved coverage within the City of Casey.

=== Format Change ===
On 20 October 2012 Surf FM changed course once more. The news syndication was removed from Surf FM and adopted instead by Surf City Sound. This coincided with a change of format as Surf FM adopted a Hot AC (adult contemporary) music playlist. The first song to air on the new Surf FM was Let Me Love You (Until You Learn to Love Yourself) by Ne-Yo.

Most recently, co-owner Ian Wood has involved a number of people in the station to help make Surf FM become more engaged with audiences and communities residing in the cities of Frankston and Casey.

=== Additional Coverage Area ===
On 18 July 2014 Surf FM switched on its Doveton transmitter. Located on the Casey side of the border between the cities of Casey and Greater Dandenong, the station can now be received in central Dandenong and nearby suburbs.

The original licence owner had the transmitter site located just east of Camberwell and for a short time operated a Christian program format between late 2008 and early 2010.

After Surf FM purchased this license, the Australian Communications and Media Authority approved the relocation from Camberwell to Doveton during 2013.

On 21st March 2022, Surf FM switched on its Transmitter in Hobart Tasmania on 1647 AM

== Radio Haanji ==
Radio Haanji
Werribee South, Victoria; Australia
- Broadcast area: Melbourne
- Frequency: 1674 kHz
- Branding: Radio Haanji (From 0220 24hrs)

Programming
- Format: Adult contemporary

Ownership
- Owner: Justin Christie
- Sister stations: Radio Haanji (timeshare); Surf FM

History
- First air date: 23 December 2011

Technical information
- Class: Narrowband

Surf City Sound was a radio station, which broadcasts on 1674 kHz in the AM narrowband from Werribee South in Melbourne's West. Previously, the station aired between 12:00 hrs. midday Fridays and 12:00 hrs. midday Sundays, with Jewish formatted Lion 1674 broadcasting on the same frequency during the rest of the week.

The station went to air on 23 December 2011, with the first song to air being On the Floor by Jennifer Lopez and featuring Pitbull. Surf Fm began a new partnership in March 2015, on the 1674AM frequency, with Hindi and Punjabi broadcaster Radio Haanji.
