= SYN Nation =

Radio station in Melbourne, Victoria

Australia
- Broadcast area: Melbourne, Victoria

Programming
- Language: English
- Format: Student radio

Ownership
- Owner: SYN Media; (Student Youth Network Inc.)
- Sister stations: SYN 90.7

History
- First air date: 1 April 2014; 11 years ago
- Last air date: 21 April 2019; 6 years ago

Links
- Webcast: Web stream
- Website: SYN Nation

SYN Nation was an Australian community radio station broadcasting to Melbourne, Victoria. First broadcast in April 2014, the station was operated by SYN Media, with programming presented entirely by volunteers aged 12–25 years old. The station broadcast from studios on the campus of RMIT University, alongside sister station SYN 90.7. The two stations were merged in April 2019 to create SYN.

== History ==
On 1 April 2014, the station launched on DAB+ digital radio. The launch of SYN Nation was attended by then-Minister for Communications Malcolm Turnbull, federal MP for Melbourne Adam Bandt, and Melbourne Lord Mayor Robert Doyle. Content for the station was supplied by volunteers at Bay FM Byron Bay, 2XX FM Canberra, Edge Radio Hobart, Gippsland FM Morwell, and 3WAY FM Warrnambool, as well as by Melbourne volunteers. In 2015, the station began broadcasting content from Wangki Yupurnanupurru Radio Fitzroy Crossing and 107.9 Radio Fremantle Fremantle, Western Australia.

On 16 April 2019, SYN Media announced that SYN Nation would merge with SYN 90.7 to create a single station, broadcasting on 90.7FM and DAB+ digital radio in Melbourne. The newly merged SYN commenced broadcasting on 22 April 2019.

== Flagship programming (at time of closure) ==
Melbourne

- Art Smitten (Arts and culture)
- The Naughty Rude Show (Sex and relationships)
- Represent (Political discussion)
- Player One (Video game discussion)

Regional

- The Edge (News & Current Affairs)

== See also ==
- Community radio
- Digital radio in Australia
- College radio
