= Nicki Gillis =

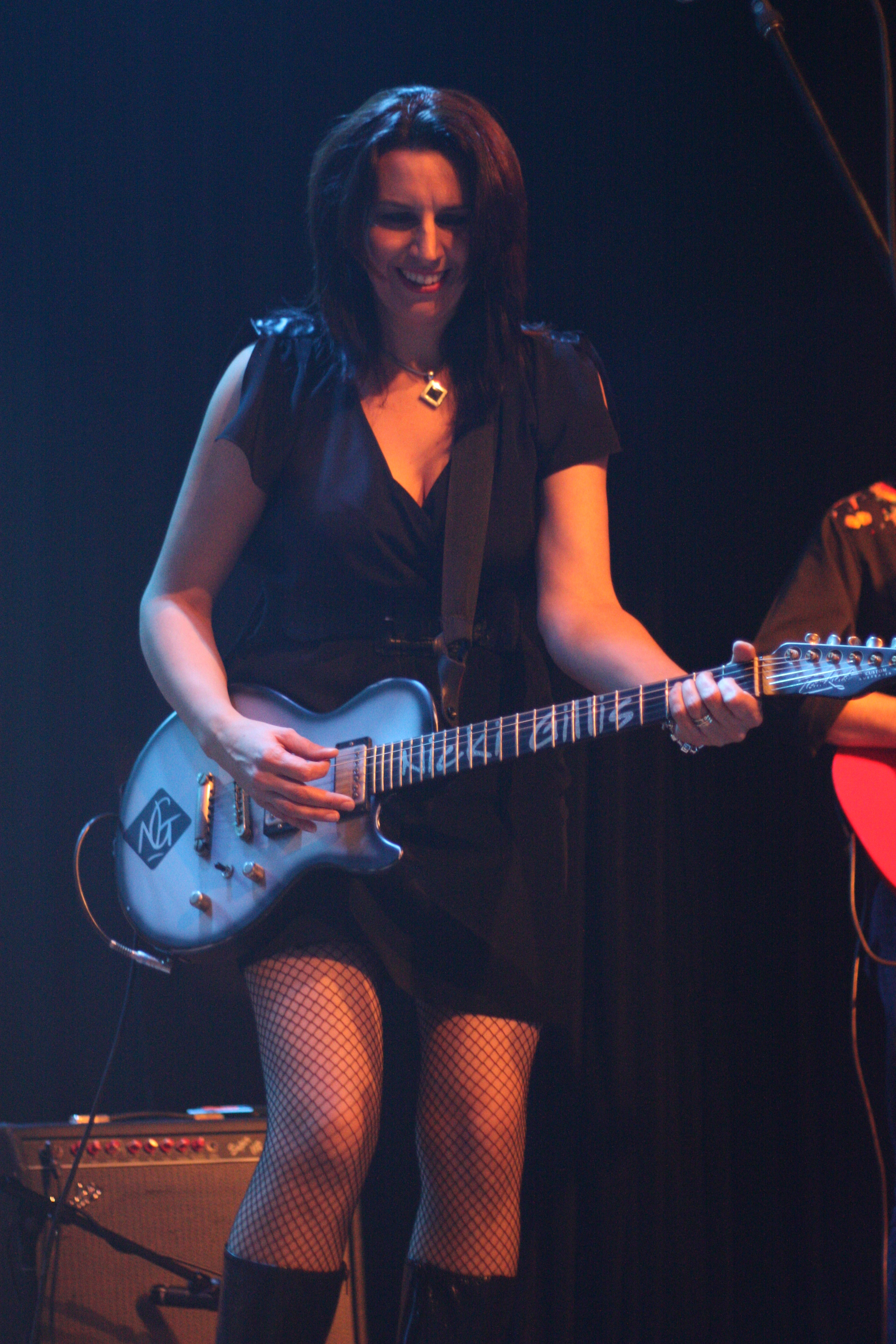

Background information
- Born: 31 January 1970 (age 56)
- Origin: Australia
- Genres: Country rock, alt-country
- Occupations: Singer, songwriter
- Years active: 1992–present

Nicki Gillis (born 31 January 1970) is an Australian vocalist and entertainer. Originating from Western Australia, she spent her early years on her family's farm near Perth while attending school. Her parents were employed in the entertainment industry, working nights at various venues across Western Australia.

== Background ==
At the age of 15, Gillis had her first professional engagement as a backing vocalist for Jackie Love's Western Australia tour. At 17 she joined her first band, Perth's "The Power Station", a seven-piece rock cover band that later became a five-piece "Cold Chisel" cover band called "East".

Gillis played in numerous Perth based bands and toured nationally with Buckshot Dolly, a six-piece country rock band, that she formed with her mother Lucy D'Olimpio in 1992. In 1996, she won the Gympie Muster Talent Quest, Australia's premier country music talent competition.

In 1997, she recorded her first self-penned collection of songs – this EP, Nicki, was then released to radio in Australia.

After 18 months living in Brisbane, Gillis returned to Western Australia to spend time writing and recording. In 2002, she headlined the World Women's Hockey Championships and performed via satellite to viewers in 16 countries.

In 2004, Gillis moved to Sydney to progress a career as a solo entertainer and initially joined with Newcastle-based, Brooke Leale, in an acoustic duet called "Velvet Moon". This was a project that lasted two years before Gillis and Leale went on their own personal music ventures.

In 2005, Gillis released her first recording – Nicki EP – a subdued introspective blend of songs bordering on acoustic folk rock rather than Gillis's trademark country infused rock of recent years. This was followed by a second EP, On The Mountain and a limited edition album titled To Here/Hear. She later combined these three releases into one album calling it On The Mountain – Special Edition.

Her album, Lucy's Daughter, was released in Australia in 2007 and received glowing reviews from all areas. Re-released in the UK in 2010 the album included a bonus track, "On The Mountain" and was broadly accepted as a quality release, with much praise from reviewers in some of the UK's leading genre specific music magazines.

Her third recording, a joint effort with Bob Howe, called Collaboration was a collection of cover versions of classic rock songs that had inspired her and Bob throughout their careers. Including songs originally performed by T-Rex, REM and Snow Patrol. The album maintained a country infused feel and also received positive acclaim across the industry.

In 2011, Gillis's fourth album was released in response to requests from audiences across the world. Consisting of cover versions of songs from 1965 – 1975 that were made famous by strong women with a message. This album, "Woman of Substance" has provided Gillis's fans with a valuable insight into the songs and women that inspired Gillis from a very young age.

She has toured the UK, US, South Pacific, Middle East, Germany and South East Asia. This international experience allowed her to develop a stage show that journeyed from nostalgic and classic hits through to contemporary rock and self-penned hits.

Gillis toured the UK in 2009, 2010, 2011 and 2012 with a band that has consisted of players such as Bob Howe on guitar, Lee Goodwin on Guitar, Cozy Dixon on drums, Dave Clemo on bass who was replaced in 2012 due to illness by Lee Jackson. Her Australian band consists of Mitch Hutchinson on guitar, Dave Roberts on drums, Justin Bianchi on bass and Bryen Willems on acoustic guitar.

Her music and performances engage audiences from many different demographics and musical genres. She donates significant time to charity work and is a strong supporter of returned Australian and UK service men and women. She has also been overseas to perform for Australian, US, British and NATO troops in Iraq, East Timor and the Solomon Islands. In 2010 she was granted honorary membership of the Blue Mountains Vietnam Veterans and Associated Forces Association. In 2011 she was made a member of the Australian Forces Entertainment Association and won the Australian Entertainment Industry's highest award for a country performer.

In 2011, Gillis set up her own production company, LockHouse Productions, with business partner Tracy Dann. The company assisted unsigned Australian and New Zealand artists develop a presence in the entertainment industry. Capitalizing on her own experience, the company quickly signed some of the biggest names in the independent country music field in Australia and was responsible for the record breaking 10 weeks at #1 in the UK charts for Nashville's Branch and Dean's release of "Your Ol' Lady's Gone".

In 2012 and 2013, Gillis continued to develop her international standing through further tours across Australia and the UK and into Germany for the first time where her own style of sophisticated country rock music was very well accepted. 2013 was also the year she went heavily into theater production by co-producing the stage show, "When Aussies Ruled Britannia" – a new style of theater/concert that was coined "Oral History Theater". In this show Frank Ifield and Keith Potger (from the Seekers) tell their stories to a background of their hits sung by Gillis and Wayne Horsburgh.

In 2014, she withdrew from consistent live performances to concentrate on building a music school, focusing on voice and performance, in Sydney's outer western suburbs. During this period she mentored and developed young performers, many of whom have gone on to write and record their own material and others who have performed in high-profile entertainment events in Sydney. During this year she also co-produced and co-starred in Frank Ifield Remembers, a two-hour stage show where Frank tells his life story to a background of songs and music from the era.

2015 saw Gillis develop her school whilst still writing and recording new material. She also took to community events within the Nepean Valley region and assisted with charity events and fundraising. This was the year she developed another stage show called "Ladies Rock", a two-hour theater concert celebrating the contribution of women to the history for popular music.

In 2016, Gillis continued nurturing local talent under the umbrella of her music school. She was also asked to join the sales and marketing team at VintageFM in outer Sydney. She continued writing and recording despite numerous personal and health setbacks.

In 2016 she also starred alongside Frank Ifield, in her own television program, Australian Country Showcase. Australian Country Showcase is broadcast across Europe and the United Kingdom on Keep It Country TV on Sky, Freesat and Freeview. The show is produced by Lockhouse Productions with Tracy Dann as the producer and director of the show.

In 2017, Gillis released new original material. Her first release through Hotdisc, "Rush" released to UK and European radio, climbed steadily until reaching number 1 on the charts. Gillis also toured the UK with her new stage show, "Tapestry The Concert" - a celebration of the songs of Carole King performed live with band. In 2017, Gillis also took on the role of General Manager at Vintage FM.

== Awards ==
- 2011 Best Country Performer or Band – Australian Entertainment ("Mo") Awards
- 2010 People's Choice Award – Australian Capital Territory Music Festival
- 2009 Frank Ifield International Spur Award
- 2008 Australian Golden Saddle Award for Best Entertainer
- 2007 Horsham Female Artist of the Year
- 2006 Blue Mountains Best Blues Jazz Album
- Before 2006 – numerous awards include prestigious Young Talent Time Scholarship at the age of 12.

== Top ten hits – (original compositions) ==
- "Leavin' You For Myself"
- "Remember Me"
- "Honey I Don't Have Time"
- "On the Mountain"
- "Watch the Wildflowers Grow"
- "Be a Star"
- "I'll Go My Own Way"
- "In The Daylight"

== Top ten hits – (cover songs) ==
- "Chasing Cars" (with Bob Howe)
- "It Doesn't Matter Anymore"
- "I Remember You" (with Frank Ifield)
- "The Ballad of Lucy Jordan"

== International tours ==
- 2006 – Iraq, Kuwait, Qatar, UAE
- 2008 – Solomon Island, East Timor, United States, Germany
- 2009 – United Kingdom
- 2010 – United Kingdom
- 2011 – New Zealand, USA, United Kingdom
- 2012 – United Kingdom
- 2013 – New Zealand, United Kingdom (twice), Germany
- 2014 – United Kingdom
- 2015 – United Kingdom
- 2017 – United Kingdom

== Discography ==
- 1997 – Nicki (EP)
- 2002 – Bed of Roses (EP)
- 2004 – On The Mountain (EP)
- 2005 – To Here/Hear (Album)
- 2006 – On The Mountain – Special Edition (Album)
- 2007 – Lucy's Daughter (Album)
- 2009 – Collaboration (with Bob Howe) (Album)
- 2009 – Lucy's Daughter (European edition) (Album)
- 2010 – "I Remember You" (with Frank Ifield) (Single)
- 2011 – Woman of Substance (Album)
- 2011 – Always on My Mind (EP)
- 2012 – Live in Hillbilly Heaven (Album)
- 2017 – "In The Daylight" (Single)
- 2017 – Essence (Album)
