= Voice of Islam (Australia) =

Islamic radio station in Australia

The Voice of Islam
- Australia
- Broadcast area: Sydney
- Frequency: 87.6 MHz FM

Programming
- Format: Islamic programmes

Ownership
- Owner: Islamic Council of NSW Ltd.; (Islamic Communications & Radio Ltd.)

Technical information
- Class: Narrowcast

Links
- Website: Official website

The Voice of Islam is a narrowcast radio station based in Lakemba and broadcasting to many parts of Sydney through a network of low power transmitters.

The objectives of The Voice of Islam include sharing Islam principles with the rest of Australia, to provide information about Islamic beliefs and practices and to broadcast programmes that reflect cultural heritage.

== Programs ==
Broadcasting recitation of the Quran, Islamic lectures, live broadcasts of Friday sermons, local and international news, radio documentaries, talk shows and programmes on contemporary topics, and trivia and competitions.

== See also ==
- List of radio stations in Australia
