= SYN Media =

Youth media organisation in Melbourne, Victoria

Student Youth Network Inc.
- Abbreviation: SYN (90.7 MHzFM
- Formation: 2000; 26 years ago
- Merger of: 3TD; Student Radio Association
- Type: Not-for-profit organisation
- Purpose: Media training and broadcasting opportunities for young people
- Headquarters: Media Collective, RMIT University, Melbourne, Australia
- Services: Radio, podcasting, television, print, online content, media education programs
- General Manager: Jane Gazzo
- Key people: Lucy Grant (Board Chair)
- Main organ: SYN (radio station)
- Affiliations: Community Broadcasting Association of Australia
- Staff: 5 ft, 20+ casual (2025)
- Volunteers: 300+ (2025)
- Students: 3500 (2025)
- Website: syn.org.au

Student Youth Network Inc., operating as SYN Media /sɪn/, 90.7FM is an Australian youth-run not-for-profit organisation providing media training and broadcasting opportunities for young people. Commonly referred to as SYN, the organisation produces new and independent media that is made by and for young people in Melbourne.

Founded in 2000, volunteers aged 12–25 – produce content for FM and DAB+ radio, television, print and online. A 2006 McNair listener survey showed a similar age group, 15–24, as the largest age group listening to community radio in Australia. SYN is a member of the Community Broadcasting Association of Australia.

SYN is a youth-led radio station that broadcasts approximately 40 programs per week. To maintain diversity, volunteers independently select content based on genre or themes, covering music, film, news, culture, comedy, and talk shows. Flagship programs include music showcases, interviews with emerging artists, and educational workshops.

Each year, SYN supports and trains 300+ volunteers under the age of 26 to produce radio, podcasts, TV and online media. This is in addition to the 3,500 school students who take part in SYN's Media Learning programs, including the flagship 'Schools on Air' program and live 'all ages' music events.

In June 2025, SYN announced radio broadcaster and music journalist, Jane Gazzo as their new GM.

== History ==
SYN Media formed on 13 June 2000 as Student Youth Network Inc. as a merger of two student radio projects – 3TD, based at Thornbury-Darebin College, and RMIT University's Student Radio Association. A merger was to take place between 3TD, SRA, La Trobe University's SUB FM, Swinburne University's 3SSR, Monash University's 3MU and Deakin's BAS Radio as the Melbourne Student Radio consortium. However, talks broke down due to disagreements around giving high school students access to the station in less desirable timeslots and less board access, leading SRA general manager Jesse Nonneman to approach 3TD managers Colin Thompson and Paul Van Eeden about splitting away from the consortium. It broadcasts on 90.7FM in Melbourne.

The new organisation would be known as SAY-FM – Student And Youth FM – however, this was changed to SYN before the group's first meeting. With the aim of promoting young people as "creators not just consumers of media", funding was ensured through the Victorian Education Department, with the financial backing of then-Education Minister Mary Delahunty, and support from state minister Justin Madden and federal minister Martin Ferguson.

In 2001, the organisation secured one of four community radio licenses broadcasting to the Greater Melbourne area, alongside 3KND, JOY 94.9 and Triple Seven (now 89.9 LightFM), and on 28 January 2003 SYN FM launched, broadcasting on 90.7FM.

Also in 2003 was the organisation's first expansion into television. SYN TV would be the first programme in Australia to simulcast on radio (via SYN FM), television (via Channel 31) and stream online. Hosted entirely by under-18s, the programme would later be spun into two shows – the music-based 1700 on C31, and the under-18 focused Objection (now Amplify) on SYN 90.7. From February 2004, the organisation also operated the Pecado zine. The zine closed in December 2006.

In 2010, the organisation launched a revamped website, and in 2011 expanded its radio signal onto DAB+ digital radio. On 1 April 2014, SYN Nation was launched, exclusive to the DAB+ platform, featuring nationally focused content from partner community radio stations in Byron Bay, Canberra, Hobart, Gippsland, Warrnambool, Fitzroy Crossing and Fremantle.

On 16 April 2019, SYN Media announced that SYN Nation would merge with SYN 90.7 to create a single station, broadcasting on 90.7FM and DAB+ digital radio in Melbourne. The newly merged SYN commenced broadcasting on 22 April 2019.

== Productions ==
SYN has many production departments: SYN Radio, SYN TV, SYN Podcasts, SYN Productions, Media Learning and SYN Online. They also produce media and hire out their studios to corporate, tertiary and outside organisations.

=== Radio ===
The organisation operates a radio station: SYN, broadcasting content created by young people aged 12–26 at SYN at their Melbourne studios, located at RMIT in Melbourne as well as in various regional hubs partnered with community radio stations in Victoria, New South Wales, the Australian Capital Territory, Tasmania and Western Australia.

=== TV ===
SYN TV
- Genre: Television production
- Founded: 2003
- Founder: SYN Media
- Website: syn.org.au/tv

As well as radio, SYN previously produced television for Melbourne's community television broadcaster C31. At SYN TV's height in 2010, it produced up to 15 hours of content per week.

=== Flagship Shows ===
SYN produces a variety of shows covering many music genres, with programming that rotates annually.

Many of its flagship shows include:

- Get Cereal (Breakfast)
- Schools on Air (SYN's School Media Training Program)
- The Hoist (Local Music)
- Amplify (Under 18's Drive Show)
- The Sports Desk
- Player One (Gaming)
- Asian Pop Nation (Asian music, media, and pop culture)

== Contribution to community broadcasting ==
SYN is one of the largest youth projects in Australia and the world, and has up to 1500 volunteers. It defines its aim as "to implement a national culture of young people broadcasting for themselves". In order to achieve this outcome, the station rotates on-air presenters frequently (approximately every three months) and all crew and executive positions annually. SYN does this to allow more than 1200 young people to gain direct media experience annually. Around 2500 students have also incorporated SYN's training and education programmes into their studies.

SYN has contributed greatly to community radio both in Australia and worldwide. For example, one spinoff project, the Bentokit Project, is a FLOSS and cross-platform radio broadcasting suite for community stations licensed under the GPL.

On 25 November 2011, a book was released entitled Life of SYN written by Ellie Rennie.

== Slogan ==
SYN has had several different slogans. The most recent slogan is "Where Young People Run the Show". Past slogans include 'Click, Switch, Watch" "Creators not Consumers", "We May Be Young But We Know Our Shit" and "Where the Kids Push the Buttons". The circle logo was developed in the mid-1990s by Caroline Worsley. The launch creative, featuring an evolution narrative, was originally designed by Olivia Fowler studying a diploma of graphic design at Holmesglen TAFE, her iconic baby in the ear, representing the birth of a radio station was developed into series of posters by Jeremy Wortsman.

== Notable alumni ==
Former SYN presenters include Australian media personalities:

- Hamish and Andy
- Ryan Shelton
- Scott Pape
- Zan Rowe
- Bridget Hustwaite
- Nova 100's Mel Tracina
- Tom & Olly
- Nat Tencic.
- Anika Luna
- Mike Liberale (Radio Mike)
