= 2016 Arkansas Democratic presidential primary =

- March 1, 2016

37 Democratic National Convention delegates (32 pledged, 5 unpledged) The number of pledged delegates received is determined by the popular vote

Candidate	Hillary Clinton	Bernie Sanders
Home state	New York	Vermont
Delegate count	22	10
Popular vote	146,057	66,236
Percentage	66.08%	29.97%
- County results Clinton: 40–50% 50–60% 60–70% 70–80% 80–90% Sanders: 40–50% 50–60%

The 2016 Arkansas Democratic presidential primary took place on March 1 in the U.S. state of Arkansas as one of the Democratic Party's primaries ahead of the 2016 presidential election.

On the same day, dubbed "Super Tuesday," Democratic primaries were held in ten other states plus American Samoa, while the Republican Party held primaries in eleven states including their own Arkansas primary.

== Opinion polling ==
Poll source	Date	1st	2nd	Other
Primary results	March 1, 2016	Hillary Clinton; 66.1%	Bernie Sanders; 30.0%	Others; 4.0%
Public Policy Polling Margin of error: ± 4.3; Sample size: 525	February 14–16, 2016	Hillary Clinton; 57%	Bernie Sanders; 32%	
Talk Business/Hendrix Margin of error: ± 3.3% Sample size: 451	February 4, 2016	Hillary Clinton; 57%	Bernie Sanders; 25%	Don't Know 18%
Suffolk University Margin of error: ± ? Sample size: 209	September 20–23, 2014	Hillary Clinton; 71%	Joe Biden; 8%	Andrew Cuomo 5% Elizabeth Warren 3% Martin O’Malley 2% Undecided/Refused 10%
Polling Company/WomenTrend Margin of error: ± ? Sample size: ?	August 6–7, 2013	Hillary Clinton; 59%	Joe Biden; 14%	Others/Undecided 27%

== Results ==
Primary date: March 1, 2016
National delegates: 69

2016 Democratic Party's presidential nominating process in Arkansas – Summary of results –
Candidate	Popular vote		Estimated delegates		
Candidate	Count	Percentage	Pledged	Unpledged	Total
Hillary Clinton	146,057	66.08%	22	5	27
Bernie Sanders	66,236	29.97%	10	0	10
Martin O'Malley (withdrawn)	2,785	1.26%			
John Wolfe Jr.	2,556	1.16%			
James Valentine	1,702	0.77%			
Rocky De La Fuente	1,684	0.76%			
Total	221,020	100%	32	5	37

== Analysis ==
Arkansas, the state where Hillary Clinton served as First Lady during her husband Bill Clinton’s tenure as governor, gave Clinton one of her largest victories during the course of the Democratic Primary. She swept the state among every major demographic – gender, race, income, and educational attainment. According to exit polls, 67 percent of voters in the Arkansas Democratic Primary were white and they opted for Clinton by a margin of 62–35 compared to the 27 percent of African Americans who backed Clinton by an even larger margin of 91–6.

After his landslide defeat, the Sanders campaign reported that Hillary Clinton had notched wins in southern states including Arkansas because Bernie Sanders did not compete with her, although this claim was widely debunked.

== See also ==
- 2016 Arkansas Republican presidential primary
