= Melbourne Jewish Radio =

Lion 1674
- Werribee South, Australia; Australia
- Broadcast area: Melbourne, Australia
- Frequency: 1674 kHz AM
- Branding: Lion 1674 (2011–2015)

Programming
- Languages: Hebrew, English
- Format: Jewish

Ownership
- Owner: Melbourne Jewish Radio
- Sister stations: Surf City Sound (timeshare, 2011–2015)

History
- First air date: 14 June 2010 (as Lion 96.1); December 2011 (as Lion 1674)
- Last air date: June 2011 (as Lion 96.1); March 2015 (as Lion 1674)
- Former frequencies: 96.1 MHz FM (2010–2011)

Technical information
- ERP: 300 watt (2011–2015)

Melbourne Jewish Radio (branded on air as Lion 96.1, later Lion 1674) was a timeshared radio station formerly broadcast on 1674 kHz in the AM narrowband from Werribee South in Melbourne's west. The station aired between 12noon Sundays and 12noon Fridays, with Surf City Sound broadcasting on the same frequency during the Shabbat period. During 2010 and 2011, Lion FM held a Temporary Community Broadcasting Licence, and broadcast from the Melbourne CBD.

== History ==
=== As a TCBL ===
Melbourne Jewish Radio was established in December 2008, with the goal of achieving a form of dedicated full-time broadcast media for the Jewish community. Previously, the Melbourne Jewish community had little representation in the media, aside from Hebrew language programmes on 3ZZZ and SBS Radio. In June 2010, broadcasting regulator Australian Communications and Media Authority granted Melbourne Jewish Radio, Inc. a 12-month TCBL on 96.1 FM – a frequency formerly used for special events – with reduced power towards Geelong due to potential co-channel interference from 96three FM.

In June 2011, the spectrum was revoked, forcing Lion FM to close. In a media release, ACMA stated they "decided not to make additional radiofrequency spectrum in the Melbourne City RA1 licence area available to temporary community broadcasting licensees."

During Senate Estimates on 18 October 2016 Eric Abetz said to ACMA Deputy Chair Richard Bean he was advised "Lion FM stopped using 96.1 for broadcasting" and went on to query Richard Bean about why the frequency had not been made available subsequently.

=== As a Narrowband station ===
In December 2011, Lion FM began broadcasting on 1674 AM, as a timeshared service with Surf City Sound. Both services closed in March 2015.
