= Scott Pape =

Australian financial writer and expert

Scott Pape OAM (born 1978) is an author, television presenter and radio commentator focused on personal finance. He is best known through the persona, The Barefoot Investor.

== Early life and career ==
Scott Pape grew up in Ouyen, Victoria, where he held odd jobs – once being paid by his father with a single BHP share. He later attended La Trobe University, receiving his Bachelor of Business degree in 2001. In 2003, Pape presented a weekly finance show for young people on SYN Radio in Melbourne.

== The Barefoot Investor ==
In 2004, Pape wrote a book, The Barefoot Investor: Five Steps to Financial Freedom, which was released in Australia in November of that year. It has since been republished, revised (as recently as 2020) and is now sold throughout the world.

Following the success of the book, Pape has taken on The Barefoot Investor as a persona, offering independent advice on personal money management, investing and gaining financial freedom via his website, public and media appearances and his subscription email service "The Barefoot Blueprint".

In April 2008, he was a participant in the Australia 2020 Summit.

=== Books ===
In 2016, Scott released a new book, The Barefoot Investor: The Only Money Guide You'll Ever Need, which has become the best selling finance book in Australia.

In 2018, Pape released a financial book aimed at children's finance titled The Barefoot Investor for Families.

November 2022 saw the release of Pape's book Barefoot Kids: Your Epic Money Adventure.

=== Television ===
In 2009, Pape started hosting The Barefoot Investor, a half-hour show about finance on CNBC. It was also broadcast on free-to-air television around Australia on Channel 10. The show was nominated for the ASTRA Awards 2010, both in the 'Best Lifestyle' and 'Best New Talent' categories. The show has since been cancelled.

He also appeared as the financial expert on the SBS show The Nest in 2008. Pape was also previously a regular guest on The 7pm Project.

Pape has also hosted and produced the shows Money School and Money Movement for Foxtel.

=== Newspaper column ===
Pape writes a weekly syndicated column on the topics of personal finance and wealth management that appears in the Courier Mail, Herald Sun, Adelaide Advertiser, Hobart Mercury, The Sunday Times, and Daily Telegraph.

=== Radio ===
The Barefoot Investor has a weekly spot on the Triple M Melbourne's The Hot Breakfast. He also appears on ABC Radio's Nightlife program, and appears on SYN Radio from time to time.

== Honours ==
In 2020, Pape received the Medal of the Order of Australia for services to the community and financial education.
