= Joy 94.9 =

JOY 94.9 (3JOY)
- Melbourne, Victoria; Australia
- Broadcast area: Melbourne City RA1
- Frequencies: FM: 94.9 MHz; DAB+: 9B Melbourne
- RDS: JOY94.9

Programming
- Format: LGBTI Community radio

Ownership
- Owner: Joy Melbourne Inc

History
- Founded: 1993
- First air date: December 1993
- Call sign meaning: "Joy"

Technical information
- Licensing authority: ACMA
- ERP: 250 W
- Transmitter coordinates: 37.810225°S 144.962141°E

Links
- Public licence information: Profile
- Webcast: Listen Live
- Website: joy.org.au

JOY 94.9 (official call sign 3JOY), stylised as JOY or JOY 94.9, is a community radio station broadcasting at 94.9 FM in Melbourne. It is Australia's first and only LGBTQI+ community radio station.

== History ==
JOY 94.9, originally incorporated on 28 June 1993 as JOY Melbourne Independent Community Broadcasters Association began its first test transmission on 1 December 1993 (World AIDS Day). Transmission was on 90.7 MHz from 268A Coventry Street, South Melbourne, a total space 80sqm consisting of 1 broadcasting studio, above a hardware store.

The first words spoken on-air were broadcast by accident by founder John Oliver saying "Can I have a cup of coffee and then we’ll get going?" The first track to be played on-air was scheduled to be Kylie Minogue's Celebration, but due to technical issues Jimmy Barnes' Working Class Man was played first. JOY continued to broadcast via temporary test transmissions, mostly on a part-time basis sharing the 90.7 frequency with other community broadcasters.

Presenters in Studio 1 the old Coventry Street Studios

Beginning in 1995, JOY released an annual Electronic and remix compilation album which was a representation of the music broadcast on-air for listeners to purchase and listen to from home. The first compilation album released was called "The Strip – Pride and JOY".

JOY's community involvement and representation has evolved over the years with the first outside live-cross occurring at the 1995 Midsumma Festival. This was cemented further with JOY's full outside broadcast in 1996 taking place from the window of "The Outlook" on Commercial Road, Prahran. This resulted in a continuous broadcast for a period of three weeks, 24 hours a day.

JOY Melbourne Independent Community Broadcasters Association changed its name to JOY Melbourne Incorporated in 1996.

In 1998, Paul Terdich was appointed as JOY Station Manager and oversaw the station's initial growth and later the station's successful application for a full-time licence. JOY initially shared the 90.7 frequency with Muslim radio (and Kool 'n' Deadly Aboriginal radio) so listeners could wake up one morning with disco divas and the next be called to Islamic prayer. The last test broadcast as an aspirant broadcaster on 90.7 was on 28 August 2001.

Out of the approximately 20 aspirant community radio licensees in Melbourne, JOY Melbourne was one of only four to be granted a full-time broadcasting licence in 2001 (the other broadcasters were SYN FM, Light FM and 3KND). In its application to the Australian broadcasting regulator (Australian Broadcasting Authority) JOY had applied for a community licence in both the Melbourne-Wide and lesser coverage Melbourne City coverage areas. However JOY Melbourne was successful in the Melbourne City licence area where it succeeded against one competing applicant then known as CityFM (Refer to ACMA licence report for official licence allocations report).

JOY Melbourne commenced full-time broadcasting on its permanent licence in January 2002 on its current frequency of 94.9 MHz. The station also increased its broadcasting space to 120sqm to include 2 broadcasting studios. 2002 saw JOY receive a grant from the Foundation for Young Australians to train same-sex attracted youth in radio which saw more than 70 young people pass through the FYA program.

2004 saw JOY Melbourne Inc. become the largest gay and lesbian community member-based organisation in Australia, with the station's full time license renewed in 2006.

In 2007 Stephen Hahn was appointed as JOY CEO Station Manager and oversaw the planning to move JOY from the South Melbourne location of 14 years to Bourke Street, Melbourne as part of the City of Melbourne's "City Village" initiative. In July 2008, after 14 years in South Melbourne, JOY 94.9 relocated to the City Village premises in Bourke Street.

Long-time presenter of Allegro Non Troppo, CBAA and JOY Board Member and JOY Melbourne Inc. Life Member Addam Stobbs died on 16 June 2010.

In June 2011, the JOY 94.9 App was released via the iTunes Store allowing people all around the world to take JOY with them.

In December 2019 it was announced that JOY 94.9 would move from its Melbourne CBD Location to the new Victorian Pride Centre, with the Andrews state government providing $800,000 over four years to assist with the move. It was expected that JOY would begin the relocation in 2021. The relocation was completed in May 2021.

In August 2022, the organisation announced an expansion that would see the station become the radio broadcasting arm of a new entity, JOY Media. The expansion included the addition of JOY Academy, to provide "training and education services to the public in podcasting, radio programming, and diversity and inclusion best practice".

== Outside Broadcasts & Special Events ==
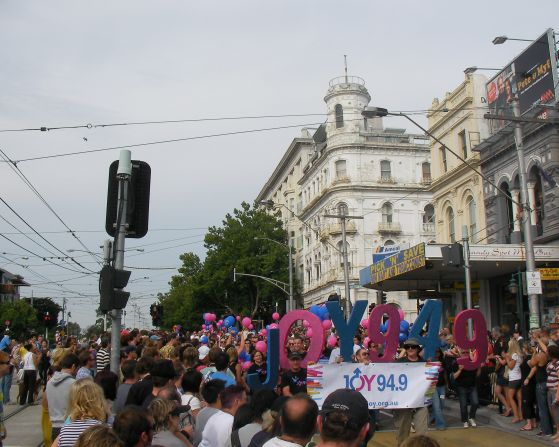
JOY 94.9 float at Midsumma Pride March on Fitzroy Street, St Kilda

JOY 94.9 has hosted a range of special event outside broadcast events and general special events since 1996. This has included co-broadcasting from inside the barricades at the 30th Sydney Gay & Lesbian Mardi Gras in conjunction with Sydney station 2SER.

JOY hosted the first same-sex on-air wedding on 1 November 2019 as part of an on-air competition.

== Incidents ==
=== Bomb Threat ===
The JOY studios were evacuated on Tuesday 20 September 2016 due to an alleged bomb threat, with the station's programming put on auto-play to allow a thorough investigation.

=== Work Environment Complaints, Bullying Allegations & Presenters Forced to Leave ===
In 2018 a letter was sent to JOY members in March, signed by 28 members, calling for the radio station's board of directors to be sacked and replaced with a temporary board. Those behind the push listed their grievances against the current board including a lack of action, an exodus of on-air staff and volunteers and a disconnect with the LGBTI communities.

== Programming ==
JOY 94.9 is the first radio station in Australia dedicated to offering programming produced by and aimed specifically at the gay, lesbian & bisexual communities. Programs on JOY incorporate a mix of talkback, music and specialist culture and lifestyle programs, including announcements promoting community events, counselling and support services and key networks supporting the gay and lesbian community. JOY 94.9 also operates a news service covering mainstream news events and issues as well those mainly concerning the gay and lesbian community and its long-running current affairs flagship, Saturday Magazine, continues to broadcast on Saturdays. The station is staffed by over 250 volunteers.

JOY 94.9 utilises online streaming audio to reach the gay and lesbian audience in the rest of Melbourne and the world.

All JOY 94.9 presenters perform their roles in voluntary capacities.

=== Music ===
JOY plays a wide array of music, with variations including techno, women's music, electronica, euro-house, disco, Easy Listening, Soft Rock, and Pop, alternative, jazz, classical, trance, independent music, gospel, folk, blues, hardcore metal, industrial, retro, brit pop, R&B, Hip Hop, Soul, Remixes and more.

=== Specialist Programming ===
Supplementing this day-time content is predominantly chat-based specialist programming broadcast from 7 pm to midnight each week day. Weekend specialist programming includes current affairs and lifestyle programming and many more varied examples in the programming schedule. The JOY schedule is updated every 4 months by the JOY program director and programming committee. Many shows remain on the schedule, but new shows are only added when the schedule is updated.

=== News ===
JOY runs a news roster covering weekdays and weekends in the morning, noon, and drive. Many newsreaders have found employment in the commercial industry, such as Nathan Gardiner who is now a newsreader at Gold 104.3, and Anthony Laughton who was employed by Nova 100/Classic Rock 91.5 and MTR 1377.

JOY Newsreaders are volunteers.

==== Q-mmunity Network News ====
QNN is a news feed produced on a weekly basis and is syndicated to several community radio stations across Australia.

== Awards and honours ==
Since JOY 94.9's inception varying shows, personalities and events have gained interest, honours and awards for their excellence in broadcasting and representation of the LGBTQI Community.

=== Community Broadcasting Association Australia Awards ===
| Year | Award |
|---|---|
| 2023 | Excellence in Outside Broadcasting – Chillout 2023 |
| 2021 | Excellence in Technical Innovation – Joy's New Home |
| 2020 | Best Special Event Broadcast – Mardi Gras 2020 |
| 2019 | Best Special Event Broadcast – Mardi Gras Special 2019 Excellence in Innovative Programming and Content - Checkpoint |
| 2018 | Excellence in Music Presenting – Jason Heath, Local Roots |
| 2017 | Excellence in Sports Broadcasting – Chicks Talkin' Footy |
| 2015 | Best New Radio Program (Music) – Babble POP! Best Station Production – JOY Radiothon, JOY 94.9 |
| 2014 | Most Innovative Outside Broadcast or Special Event Broadcast: World AIDS Day Worldwide, JOY 94.9 |
| 2012 | Most Innovative Outside Broadcast or Special Event Broadcast – JOY and 3AW: Better Together Broadcast JOY 94.9 |
| 2008 | Troy Garner Excellence in Sports Programming Excellence in Spoken Word, News and Current Affairs Programming Best Initiative to Build Station Capacity |
| 2007 | Can't Get Out of the Car award Best Sponsorship Announcement or Promotion award High Commendation for Best Special Event Broadcast |
| 2005 | Can't Get Out of the Car award |
| 2000 | Best Sponsorship Announcement or Promotion award |

=== GLOBE Community Awards ===
The GLOBE Community Awards celebrates achievement in Victoria's Lesbian, Gay, Bisexual, Transgender and Intersex communities, highlighting the work of a diverse range of organisations and individuals that benefit and unite the Victorian LGBTIQ community.

- 2020 Finalists:
  - Preventing social isolation in LGBTIQ communities: Kerrie & Dolly
  - Outstanding LGBTIQ media reporting: The Informer Daily
  - Outstanding LGBTIQ media reporting: Dean Arcuri (Community Darling: Kerrie & Dolly)
  - LGBTIQ Artist of the year: Dean Arcuri
- 2018 – Media Excellence award winner – Chicks Talking Footy
- 2015 – Connecting Our Community Winner

=== ALSO Foundation Awards ===
- 2008 – Most Outstanding Media Award

=== Other Awards ===
- 1997 – Melbourne Rainbow Media Award
- 1996 – Melbourne Rainbow Media Award
- 1992 – Pride Young Achievers Award

== See also ==
- List of radio stations in Australia
