= Raw FM (Australian radio network) =

- Australia
- Broadcast area: Australia, Online
- Frequencies: FM band and Internet radio

Programming
- Format: Dance

Ownership
- Owner: Get Real Media

History
- First air date: December 1999

Links
- Website: www.rawfm.com.au

Raw FM is an Australian narrowcast radio network, consisting of stations in New South Wales, Australian Capital Territory, Victoria and Queensland.

The network was started with the opening of a station on the Central Coast of New South Wales in 1999 and then expanded to take on the Northern Beaches of Sydney, parts of New South Wales, Gold Coast and Australian Capital Territory. It consists of 29 stations linked via the Optus D2 satellite.

== Programming ==
Raw FM's programming is aimed at the 14–30 age group. The station broadcasts a mix of electro house, indie dance, Trance music, Club Hits and Urban sounds. It also features programs from Roger Sanchez, Above & Beyond, Global Dance Session, as well as live broadcasts from major clubs and events in its broadcast areas.

The service is played out from the Telstra Broadcast Services facility in the Pitt Street Telephone Exchange and transported to Oxford Falls where it is uplinked to the Optus D2 satellite across Australia and New Zealand.

== FM radio frequencies and locations ==
=== New South Wales ===
- 87.6FM Albury
- 87.6FM Armidale
- 87.6FM Brookvale
- 87.6FM Cabarita
- 88.0FM Central Coast
- 88.0FM Coffs Harbour
- 88.0FM Collaroy
- 87.6FM Goulburn
- 87.6FM Grafton
- 87.6FM Jindabyne
- 87.6FM Kempsey
- 87.6FM Kingscliff
- 87.6FM Lake Cathie
- 88.0FM Macksville
- 87.6FM Murwillumbah
- 88.0FM Newcastle
- 87.6FM Nowra
- 87.8FM Ocean Shores
- 88.0FM Perisher
- 87.6FM Port Macquarie
- 87.6FM Pottsville
- 87.6FM Queanbeyan
- 87.8FM Sawtell
- 88.0FM South West Rocks
- 88.0FM Terranora
- 88.0FM Ulladulla
- 88.0FM Urunga
- 88.0FM Wagga Wagga
- 87.6FM Wauchope
- 87.6FM Yamba

=== Queensland ===
- 88.0FM Burleigh Heads
- 88.0FM Coolangatta
- 88.0FM Surfers Paradise

=== Victoria ===
- 87.6FM Shepparton
