= Personalcasting =

Personalcasting, or personalized digital television (PDTV), is an application that uses news-on-demand algorithms to deliver tailored broadcast news (from radio or television) on a wide range of computing platforms including mobile phones and PDAs. Unlike podcasting, which is a series of digital media files (either audio or video) that are typically downloaded through web syndication, personalcasting automatically indexes, clusters and extracts information from news sources.

== Application ==
With personalcasting technology, users can create complex queries combining keywords, named entities (e.g., people, organizations, and places), sources (e.g., CNN, MSNBC, ABC) or time intervals (e.g., specific days, weeks or years). These queries result in selected video stories specific to user interest. Conversely, there are companies that offer personalcasting services directly to news outlets - allowing the organizations to create customized, around-the-clock programs for listeners.

By personalizing the selection of stories and the platforms from which they are delivered, users are afforded a more individual and enhanced news experience based on their predilections. This is an especially beneficial application for people wanting to listen to personalized information during their commutes to and from work. According to a U.S. Census Bureau analysis, driving to work was the favored means of commute of nearly nine out of 10 American workers (87.7 percent), with most people (77 percent) driving alone.

In addition, algorithms can be created to follow a user's personalcast sessions to capture user interest. The system can then automatically broaden a user's queries and selections to include additional content based on preferences.

Personalcasting technology was developed by a community of scientists and individual technology companies during the late 1990s and early 2000s as a way to provide more convenient access to broadcast news. Earlier systems required content to be manually annotated. However, more recent systems automatically extract information from a variety of news sources.

== History ==
The first known reference to personalcasting was in 1999 by a technology company named VoicePress. Shortly thereafter, Mark T. Maybury, editor of Intelligent Multimedia Interfaces and Intelligent Multimedia Information Retrieval used the term personalcasting at an international conference on user modeling in Germany and he also included the term in several research papers.

In Japan, Sony applied this concept to television programming in 2000, launching a site called PercasTV that provides live personal video distribution service on the Internet.

Building upon content based news understanding algorithms that simultaneously analyzed multiple media streams (e.g., audio, video, textual), a personalization system that automatically generated both content and media tailored to individual queries and preferences was invented to personalize broadcast news. A US Patent on personalcasting was awarded in 2008 for "Personalized broadcast news navigator".
