= Thornbury High School =

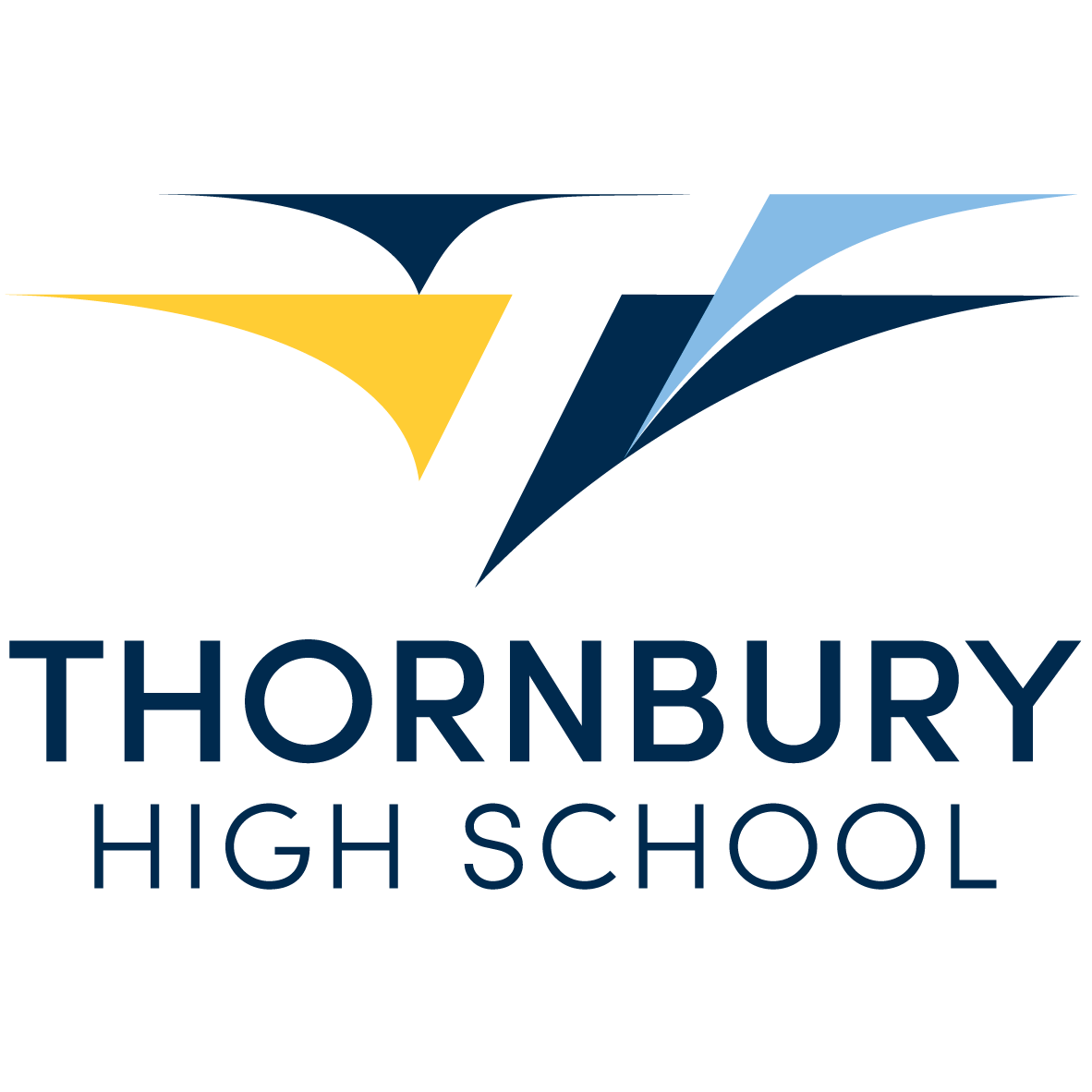

Location
- 238 Collins Street, Thornbury, Melbourne, Victoria; Australia; 37°45′22″S 145°01′32″E

Information
- Type: Government-funded co-educational secondary day school
- Motto: Achievement and Excellence
- Established: 1962; 64 years ago
- Principal: Lars Andersson
- Years: 7–12
- Enrolment: 1,200
- Houses: Saunders, Blair, Onus, Nicholls (red, blue, green & yellow)
- Colour: blue white yellow
- Vice Principals: Paul Mameghan; Ryan Millar; Cara Martin
- Website: www.thornburyhs.vic.edu.au

Thornbury High School is a government-funded co-educational secondary day school, located in Thornbury, Victoria, Australia. It is situated at the eastern end of the City of Darebin, on Dundas Street & Collins Street, Thornbury.

The school caters to a cohort of diverse students, and has a long history of celebrating multiculturalism and cultural inclusion through its engagement with initiatives such as Harmony Day, and the Wirrapanda Foundation. The school is also a strong promoter of the performing arts through its involvement with the Malthouse Theatre's "Suitcase Series", student radio station SYN FM (originating at the school as 3TD FM), and Class TV, a student-produced television program airing on Channel 31, winner of two Antenna Awards for Best Youth Program.

== Notable alumni ==
- Billy Celeski, soccer player
- Andrew Lovett, Australian rules footballer who played for Essendon Football Club
- Rob Leota
