= Kiss FM Australia =

Dance music station in Melbourne

Kiss FM
- Melbourne, Victoria; Australia
- Frequency: 87.6 MHz FM
- Branding: Kiss FM

Programming
- Language: English
- Format: Electronic & dance music

Ownership
- Owner: Timmy Byrne

History
- First air date: 2005

Technical information
- Class: Narrowcast (LPON)
- Repeaters: 87.8 MHz FM; 88.0 MHz FM

Links
- Website: www.kissfm.com.au

Kiss FM is a narrowcast dance music station based in Melbourne, broadcasting on various frequencies between 87.6 and 88.0 FM in Melbourne. KISS FM broadcasts underground dance music as an independent radio service.

== History ==
The station grew out of aspirant community license Kiss 90 FM, which was not granted a full-time license in 2001, and Sydney and Brisbane narrowcaster Rhythm FM. Rhythm FM was bought by some of the previous management of Kiss 90 and relaunched as Kiss FM in 2005 as a narrowcast radio service.

=== Kiss 90 FM ===
Kiss 90 was an aspirant dance radio station based in Melbourne, Australia. The station broadcast sporadically to the Greater Melbourne area between 1994 and 2001 on 89.9 FM.

The station continually broke new songs and gave airplay to many artists for the first time on Australian radio, pushing many into the mainstream charts. This resulted in mainstream commercial radio stations introducing more dance music into their playlists.

==== February 1994 ====
Michael Hughes and Nigel Slater, both presenters of dance shows on local metro stations, discussed the opportunity of a 100% dance format radio station. At the time, Melbourne’s commercial radio stations were playing classic rock, hits, memories, easy music and rock. None of the stations were running a top 40 format during the day, let alone dance music. A few dance shows existed on local community stations, but they were often limited to small broadcast areas, obscure time slots and for limited periods. Despite the challenges of finding these shows, many had strong and loyal audience bases. At the time, the mainstream media didn’t see the potential for a dance format station and were more interested in focusing on getting the biggest slice of the more traditional baby boomers.

==== March 1994 ====
Michael Hughes and Nigel Slater joined forces with renowned night club promotions and event managers Jake Kogakis, Peter Raff and Eric Pipersberg (aka The Gingerbread Men). Together, they worked to form a broadcasting organization, gain support from the dance music industry, nightclubs and Melbourne’s best DJs.

==== June 1994 ====
A non-profit organization, called Dance Club Broadcasters was formed with Michael, Nigel, Jake, Peter and Eric as well as representatives of the industry. A submission for a temporary license was then put to the Australian Broadcasting Authority (ABA). The committee discussed various options on what to call the new station including D-FM (for Dance FM) as well as GBM FM (initials of Jake, Raff and Eric’s company, GingerBread Men). Eventually, the name Kiss was agreed on due to the awareness and reputation leading dance stations in other big cities including London and New York.

==== July 1994 ====
Kiss debuts on Melbourne airwaves with a pre-recorded 24-hour broadcast. This was a low power (200 watts) broadcast from the top of Swinburne University in Hawthorn reaching the surrounding eastern suburbs and inner city. Contrary to expectations, with no publicity, the station received 50 phone calls from excited listeners and support steadily grew for the station.

==== October 1994 – The first Melbourne-wide broadcast ====
Officially the 2nd broadcast, for most it was the first time they experienced Kiss in Melbourne. The station was on air for six weeks, broadcasting live from studios above Chapel St in South Yarra. The transmitter (as with all future broadcasts) was high-power and located at the top of Mt Dandenong (along with the rest of Melbourne’s high-power commercial and national FM and television stations) which enabled the station to cover all of Melbourne, Geelong and the Mornington Peninsula.

By 1996 and the 5th Broadcast the Board that ran Kiss was virtually non-existent. The Station had been moved from Prahran to Collins Street in the Melbourne CBD and was close to folding. Timmy Byrne who copresented along with Paul Main and Mark Neil the most popular show on Kiss FM Beautiful Saturdays approached what was left of the board to lobby joining the board and offered his services as station manager. Timmy had extensive experience in the media both in radio and audio production as well as television production. He had held DJ residencies in Melbourne's major clubs – The Underground, Redhead and Saratoga to name but a few plus he also had a degree in Media and Japanese. At the AGM held at the new Collins Street address he was voted onto the board and made station manager.

Timmy then set about building Kiss into the highly successful station it became. A new Board was gradually recruited, and volunteers appointed in various departments.

By the eighth broadcast the station was forced to relocate and moved to St. Kilda. It was here that it really hit its mark. There were now some 20 volunteers, eight paid staff and 50 plus DJs. The station was continuing to do intermittent broadcasts of four to six weeks, but each broadcast saw it go from strength to strength.

To keep the whole thing going between broadcasts Go Magazine was launched to great critical acclaim – it was Australia's first dance music magazine.

The station ventured outside the studio on numerous occasions broadcasting live from street raves, The Big Day Out, The Apollo Festival and the St Kilda Festival.

Marketing efforts saw bill boards promote each broadcast, Kiss cruisers were on the road facilitating live crosses from clubs and events and a Kiss emblazoned tram sponsored by Telstra spread the Kiss message across the wider metropolitan area.

Every international DJ that visited Melbourne when the station was on air graced the Kiss studio. The likes of John Digweed, Frankie Knuckles, Paul Oakenfold, Derek May, Juan Atkins and more.

==== Licensing ====
Kiss 90 was licensed as an 'aspirant' community broadcaster and created to foster Melbourne's dance music culture. The station's mission was to achieve a full-time Melbourne-wide community license.

Kiss conducted 21 broadcasts to gain listen support and convince the Australian Broadcasting Authority (ABA) to grant a permanent Melbourne wide license. The station was one of many aspirant community groups who shared the 89.9FM frequency in Melbourne. Kiss, like the other aspirants was only allowed to broadcast for a limited amount of time, usually for 4–8 weeks at any one time.

After many delays, the ABA finally made a decision on the license and Kiss was not successful. The ABA awarded the available high-power FM frequencies to the Light FM (Christian) on 89.9FM and SYN (Student Youth Network) on 90.7FM. At the same time, the ABA awarded a low-power FM licence for Melbourne and the inner city to Joy FM to serve the Gay and Lesbian community.

For more information: ACMA Allocation of community licences in Melbourne

==== Test broadcasts ====
Number	Start date	End date	Weeks on air
1	2 July 1994	2 July 1994	(1 day)
2	14 October 1994	27 November 1994	6 weeks
3	20 February 1995	20 March 1995	4 weeks
4	18 June 1995	16 July 1995	4 weeks
5	18 August 1995	11 September 1995	3 weeks
6	24 November 1995	18 December 1995	3 weeks
7	3 May 1996	27 May 1996	3 weeks
8	26 July 1996	24 August 1996	4 weeks
9	27 November 1996	26 December 1996	4 weeks
10	21 March 1997	19 April 1997	4 weeks
11	August 1997		4 weeks
12	24 October 1997	November 1997	4 weeks
13	25 January 1998	22 March 1998	7 weeks
14	July 1998		4 weeks
15	August 1998		6 weeks
16	25 January 1999	7 March 1999	5 weeks
17	6 September 1999	17 October 1999	6 weeks
18			

==== Programming ====
The programming format had consistent shows across the weekdays with familiar breakfast, morning, afternoon, drive and evening request shows but the music and the presentation style was like nothing else on Melbourne radio at the time. During the evenings and over the weekends, Kiss had specialist nightclub DJs doing niche dance shows with an emphasis on a different dance genre each night.

Although some of the DJs changed during the broadcasts, this format remained and enabled Kiss to reach a wide audience during the day but also build strong niche audience followings in the evenings and over the weekend.

==== First Program Grid: October/November 1994 ====
Weekdays

Time	Show	Presenters
07:00	Breakfast	Greg Maxwell & Natalene Muscat
10:00	Morning Show	David Reece
13:00	Club Lunch	Various DJs in the mix
14:00	Afternoon Show	Sean Quinn
16:00	Dangerous Drive	Michael Hughes & Annette Lipert
19:00	Night Bliss	Nigel Slater

Weekends

Time	Saturday	Sunday
07:00	Breakfast Steve Douglas	Wind-down Show DJ Mal
10:00	Morning Glory Dean Cherney	Ambient Brewster
12:00	Pick Up The Soap Eric, Alex and Dean	I wish Johnce
14:00	Beautiful Saturdays Timmy Byrne, Paul Main & Mark Neil	Camping Out Lisa Garner
17:00	Kiss D-25 (Dance Chart) Michael Hughes	Aussie Kiss Ashley James
20:00	Night Bliss Nigel Slater	Andy's House Andy Van
22:00	Kiss In The Clubs Live from Melbourne clubs	Intoxication Frank Gee
00:00	Kiss In The Clubs (cont)	Hot BBQ Mr Takse
02:00	Kiss In The Clubs (cont)	Madd J-Madd & T-Madd
04:00	Wind-down DJ Mal	Watt's Up Leon Danziger

Specialist shows, weeknights

Time	Monday	Tuesday	Wednesday	Thursday	Friday
22:00	Feed Your Head Richie Rich	Satin Service Paul Main & Timmy B	Happy House Mark James	Air Raid Wayne Fernandex & Craig Grant	Clubbed Out John Course
00:00	Mindbomb H20 & Rudeboy	Disco Universe Tony Crea	Progressive House Sean Quinn & KCee	The Joint Peril & Rob Farley	Serious Selection Liz Millar
02:00	Industrial Ollie Olsen	Deep House & Garage Nigel Last	Speedball Dj Speedball	Real Hip Hop	Kiss in the Clubs Live from Melbourne Nightclubs
04:00	Overnight Franky Dee	Fresh Kiss Various	Tracktion Ian B	Brother's Groove Steve Douglas & Steve Eno	Early Breakfast Steve Brooks

Kiss FM currently has active transmitters at Flemington, Geelong, Kangaroo Ground, Melbourne City, and a relay service to Cairns. Previously, Kiss FM had also broadcast in regional Victoria in Wangaratta and Daylesford however these services were under an agreement with another operator, who has since closed the services and sold the licences to other broadcast service operators.

Today, the station is owned and managed by Timmy Byrne & Kate Wignell. It is the home of duo TRANCEGRESSION, which features live DJ mixes including vocal hard trance though to hardstyle; The Beautiful Drive with Timmy Byrne. Annually, the station hosts a dance party on Australia Day - 26 January - at the Sidney Myer Music Bowl, known as Kiss My Grass. All radio hosts are invited to play a 45-minute set to an audience exceeding 10,000.

=== Kiss and KIIS ===
In late 2013, Kiss FM had unsuccessfully attempted to prevent commercial radio network Australian Radio Network rebranding its Mix Network stations - initially only in Sydney – to the similar KIIS. At the time of the attempt, Kiss FM's trademark had expired, and a new application from ARN for KIIS had been submitted and accepted. With industry rumours that Melbourne's Mix 101.1 would also rebrand to KIIS, Kiss FM Australia launched the "Kiss Off ARN" campaign, stating that ARN's new branding was a breach of their trademark, and that the station would be pursuing legal action. However, in February 2014, the two parties reached a "confidential agreement", and the issue never made it to court.

In November 2014, it was confirmed that Mix 101.1 would rebrand as KIIS, and did so in January 2015.

Kiss FM is the only Australian radio station to be invited to the prestigious International Radio Festival. Kiss FM has participated three times. Twice in Zurich, Switzerland and in 2018 Valletta, Malta. Each time Timmy Byrne (station manager & presenter "The Beautiful Drive") has presented an all Australian dance music version of his show to a world wide audience of up to 100 million people.
