= 3KND =

- Melbourne, Victoria; Australia
- Broadcast area: Melbourne RA1
- Frequencies: AM: 1503 kHz; DAB+: 9B Melbourne

Programming
- Language: English
- Format: Indigenous Australians community radio

Ownership
- Owner: First Australians Media Enterprises Aboriginal Corporation

History
- First air date: June 2003
- Call sign meaning: Kool N Deadly

Technical information
- Licensing authority: ACMA
- ERP: 5,000 W
- Transmitter coordinates: 37.744893°S 145.110507°E

Links
- Public licence information: Profile
- Webcast: Listen live (via iHeartRadio)
- Website: www.3knd.org.au

3KND is a community radio station which represents the Indigenous communities within Greater Melbourne, Victoria, Australia. 3KND broadcasts in Melbourne at 1503 on the AM radio band and also streams on the internet. By late 2006, 3KND had the beginnings of an mp3 library. In 2011, 3KND added DAB+ (digital broadcasting) to its broadcast services, which operate 24/7. As at early 2019, the station operator is First Australians Media Enterprises (FAME), formerly the South Eastern Indigenous Media Association (SEIMA). The station provides training for indigenous broadcasters.

== History ==
The 1503 frequency had been previously vacated by 3AK as it moved to occupy 1116 AM The first test broadcast was in 1998.

3KND was one of the later entrants into the temporary community broadcasting period in Melbourne as part of the lead up to the granting of four additional community licences for the City. It was granted the only AM license available for community radio at that time. 3KND was licensed at the same time as JOY 94.9, for the LGBT community; Christian contemporary-formatted Triple 7 (now LightFM); and the student-run SYN FM (now SYN 90.7) At the time it was founded, 3KND was Melbourne's first Indigenous radio station.

Official broadcasting began in June 2003. Internet streaming was introduced in 2006. 3KND was one of nine Melbourne community radio stations to launch a digital radio (specifically, DAB+) service during an historic simulcast from Federation Square on 14 April 2011.

Since 2016, 3KND has published a Top 100 indigenous songs list. In 2019, those top songs are numbered from 100 down to 1 for the first time, with top honours going to Ruby Hunter's Proud, Proud Women, the first song she wrote.

== Internet streaming ==
3KND's internet streaming is provided by Internode (ISP).

== Program categories ==
- Breakfast
- Talkback & Chat
- Aboriginal Current Affairs
- Sports
- Music and Entertainment
- Arts News
- Health Programs
