= Bobby Jindal 2016 presidential campaign =

American political campaign

Bobby Jindal for President
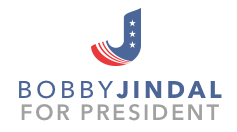
- Campaign: 2016 United States presidential election
- Candidate: Bobby Jindal; Governor of Louisiana (2008–2016)
- Affiliation: Republican Party
- Status: Announced: June 24, 2015; Suspended: November 17, 2015
- Headquarters: New Orleans, Louisiana
- Key people: Timmy Teepell (campaign manager); Wes Anderson (chief pollster)
- Receipts: US$1,442,463 (2015-12-3)
- Slogan(s): Tanned, Rested, Ready

Website
- www.BobbyJindal.com (archived - November 17, 2015)

The 2016 presidential campaign of Bobby Jindal, the 55th Governor of Louisiana, was announced on June 24, 2015. His candidacy for the Republican nomination for President of the United States in the 2016 election came after several years of speculation following the 2012 election. Jindal is the first Indian American and third Asian American to run for president of the United States.

On November 17, 2015, Jindal announced that he was suspending his campaign for president.

== Background ==
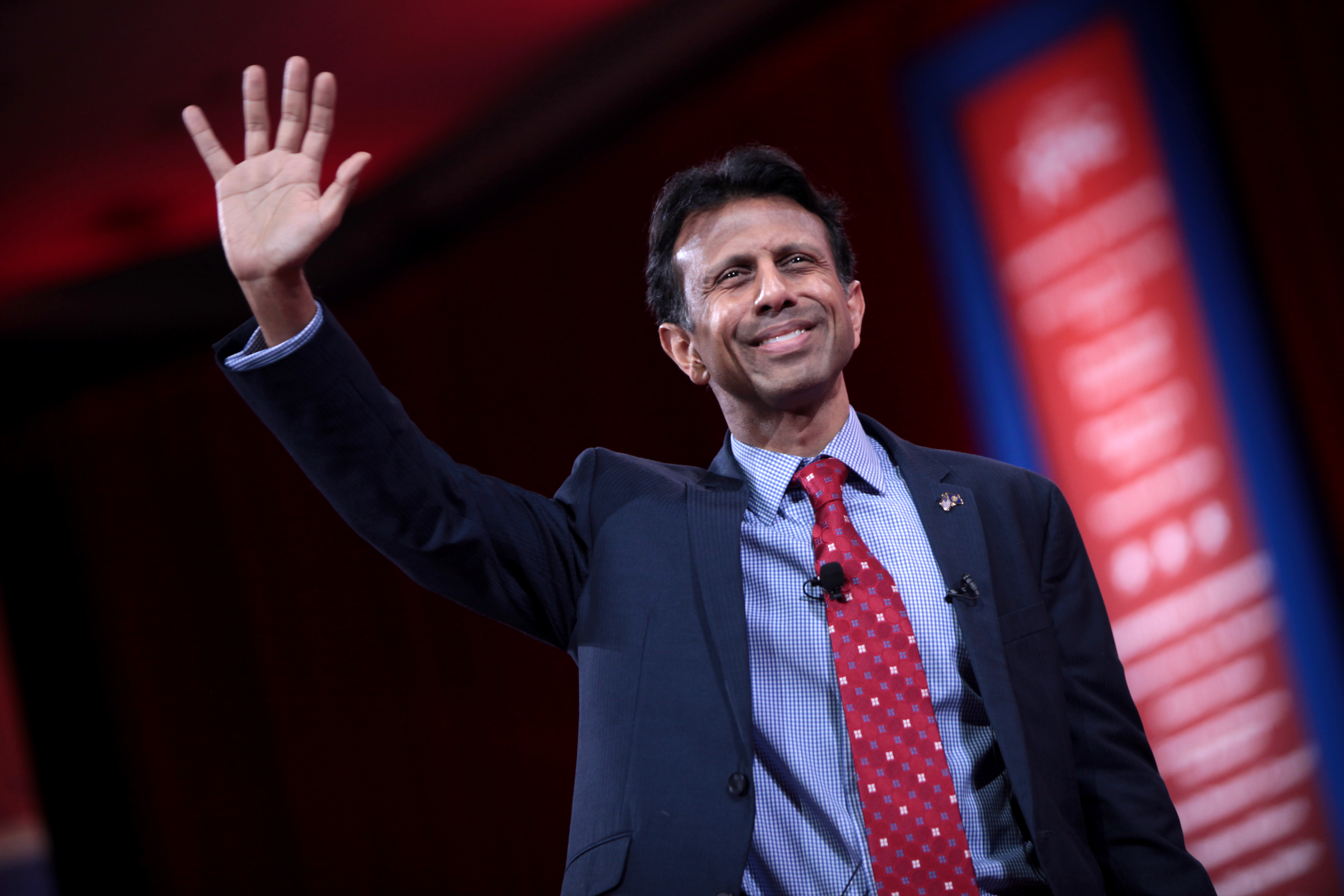
Governor Bobby Jindal speaking at the 2015 Conservative Political Action Conference in March 2015.

Jindal came to national prominence during the 2003 election for Louisiana governor.

In what Louisianans call an open primary (but is technically a nonpartisan blanket primary), Jindal finished first with 33 percent of the vote. He received endorsements from the largest newspaper in Louisiana, the New Orleans Times-Picayune; the newly elected Democratic mayor of New Orleans, Ray Nagin; and the outgoing Republican governor, Mike Foster. In the general election, Jindal faced the outgoing lieutenant governor, Kathleen Babineaux Blanco of Lafayette, a Democrat. Despite winning in Blanco's hometown, he lost many normally conservative parishes in northern Louisiana, and Blanco prevailed with 52 percent of the popular vote.

Political analysts suggested two explanations for his loss. Some blamed Jindal for his refusal to answer questions about his religion and ethnic background brought up in several Democratic advertisements, which the Jindal campaign called "negative attack ads." Others noted that a significant number of conservative Louisianans remain more comfortable voting for a conservative Democrat than for a Republican. Despite losing the election, Jindal became a well-known figure on the state's political scene and a rising star within the Republican Party as a result of his campaign.

In 2004, Jindal ran for the House seat in Louisiana's First Congressional District, winning with 78 percent of the vote. He was re-elected in 2006.

In early 2007, Jindal announced his candidacy for governor of Louisiana and became an early front-runner on the Republican side. In Louisiana's blanket primary, he faced 11 opponents and received 54 percent of the vote. Because he received a majority of votes in the primary, no runoff was necessary. He was re-elected in a similar fashion in 2011, with 66 percent of the vote.

When he took office in January 2008, at age 36, Jindal became the first Indian American governor and the youngest sitting governor in the United States.

== Campaign ==
Jindal officially launched his campaign for the 2016 Republican presidential nomination on June 24, 2015, with an announcement via Twitter, ahead of a formal announcement in the New Orleans suburb of Kenner later that day. Jindal also posted a hidden camera video to Facebook that showed Jindal and wife, Supriya, announcing his intention to run for president to their children. Jindal's children's relatively muted reactions to the announcement helped the video go viral. The video was later removed, and Jindal spokeswoman Shannon Dirmann claimed that criticism of the video came largely from "liberals".

Aside from being the first Indian American to run for President of the United States, Jindal was the first Asian American to mount a nationwide campaign for president.

Jindal's campaign slogan was "Tanned. Rested. Ready." The slogan, according to an email sent to his supporters, was meant to quell criticism he had received from the media for distancing himself from his Indian-American heritage. The email referred to those making the claims as "the liberal media." The Nixon Foundation tweeted a message "pointing out" that the slogan had originated from that of a satirical T-shirt featuring Richard Nixon, initially made popular at the Republican National Conference in 1988.

On August 3, Jindal appeared at a nationally televised forum, where he expressed his disillusion with President Barack Obama. Jindal claimed that Obama was trying to divide the country along with liberals, insisting that the president was transforming "the American dream into the European nightmare", a phrase that he was noted to have used commonly. Jindal did not qualify for the first Republican debate on August 6, averaging in 13th place in the polls used to determine the invited candidates. Despite this, Jindal was allowed to participate in the undercard debate, his performance being seen as favorable by Michele Bachmann who claimed on Twitter after the debate that the millennials she watched the debate with were favorable of Jindal. After Scott Walker unveiled his health care plan on August 18, Jindal insisted that it was similar to the Affordable Care Act and one of his staffers was reported to as saying that Walker collaborated with Democratic presidential candidate Bernie Sanders on the plan. On August 21, Jindal boasted that he displayed what he called "videos uncovered" from Planned Parenthood and furthered, "I'm here to tell you Planned Parenthood should not get another dime of our taxpayer dollars." On August 30, Jindal claimed that he was the only candidate in the Republican field that had reduced the size of the government and said allowing immigrants to not "come here legally, learn English, adopt our values, roll up our sleeves and get to work" was invasive.

By early September 2015, Jindal was polling about 1 percent of the Republican primary electorate. That month, Jindal criticized Republican front-runner Donald Trump as having no substance and accused him of being a "narcissist." He also released two videos online mocking Trump. Trump responded by saying that he had never met Jindal, that he did not believe Jindal had a chance of securing the Republican nomination, and that he would "only respond to people that register more than 1 percent in the polls." Previously, Jindal had called Trump an "unserious carnival act," placing Jindal among a field of other Republican presidential candidates—such as Jeb Bush, Rick Perry, and Rand Paul—who had targeted Trump but had not surpassed him in any polls. Jindal spoke positively at that time about his campaign in Iowa. There was speculation that Jindal would be benefited by Walker's withdrawal from the race.

During the second Republican presidential debate, hosted by CNN, Jindal criticized Republicans in Congress for not having "half the fight in them the Senate Democrats did," and claimed—in an attempt to appeal to anti-abortion conservatives—that he had defunded Planned Parenthood in Louisiana as governor. Jindal was the sole presidential candidate to not pose for a photo op with the other candidates. Jake Tapper of CNN said he had opted to remain in the spin room.

On October 2, Jindal tweeted an accusation against Trump suggesting that he was in favor of single payer healthcare system and charged Ted Cruz with not showing "conservative leadership" in not opposing Trump for the view. Jindal furthered that Cruz was only showing support of Trump because he hoped to court his voters when he eventually dropped out of the race. By mid-October, Jindal was speculated to be ending his campaign after having only $260,000 to spend at the end of the previous month and spending significantly more than that of the third quarter's fundraising, his amount raised noted as being lower than that of some of his competitors and putting him in position to suspend his campaign similarly to Rick Perry and Scott Walker once their fundraising was unable to suffice. The lack of finances left Jindal in a worsened financial position than previous competitors Rick Perry and Scott Walker when they ended their campaigns the prior month.

On November 8, 2015, Jindal participated at the National Religious Liberties Conference alongside Ted Cruz and Mike Huckabee, and said that "Christians are under physical assault all over the world and Christian values are under assault right here at home". Conservative radio host Kevin Swanson, who hosted the conference, advocated for the execution of homosexuals in his speech. Two other speakers at the conference, Reverend Phillip Kayser and Joel McDurmon, have also spoken of the death penalty for homosexual acts.

=== CNBC debate ===
Jindal was polling better in Iowa than he was nationally. Due to this, a change in criteria would have benefitted him.

=== Movement in Iowa ===
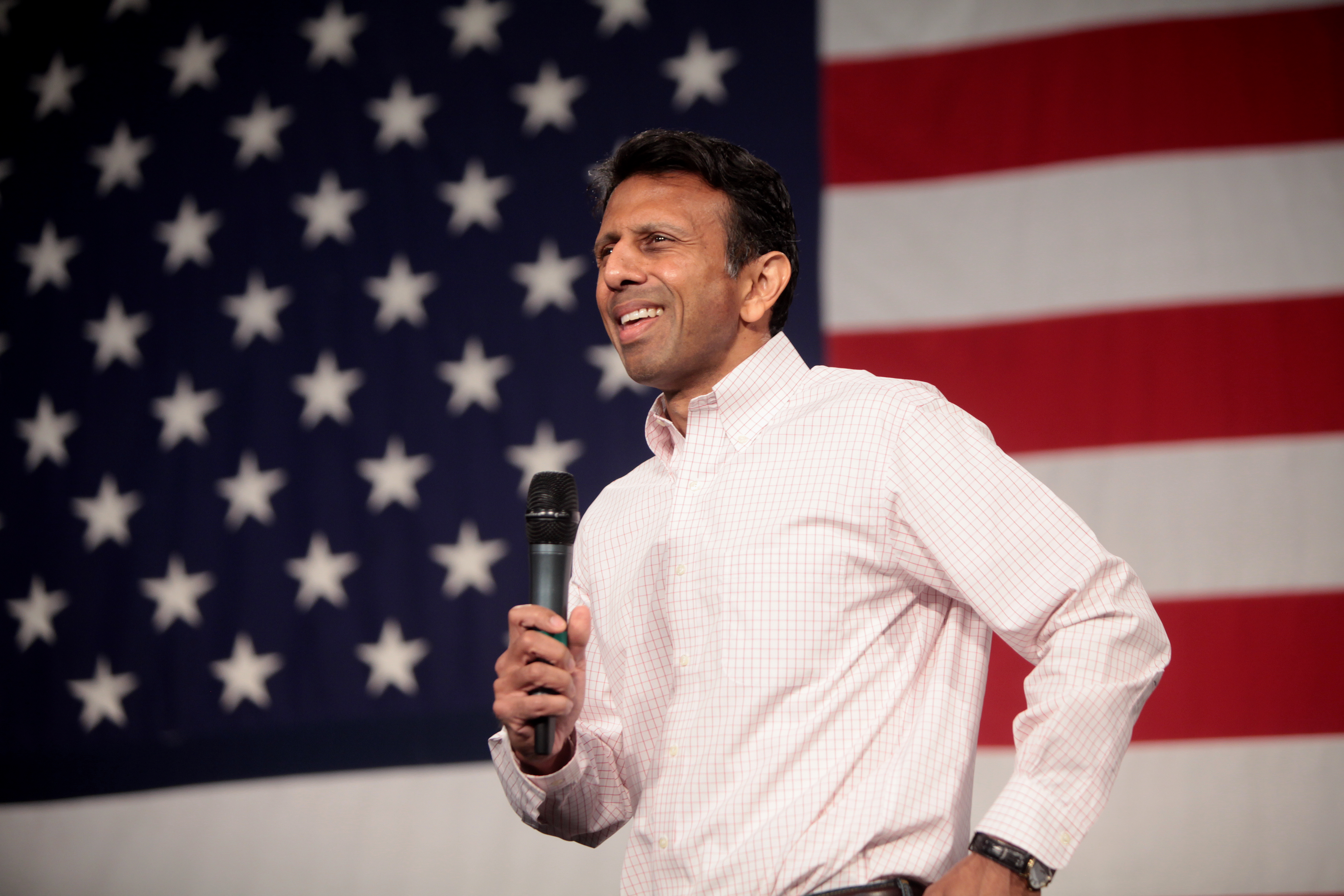
Jindal speaking at an event hosted by the Iowa Republican Party in October 2015.

Three weeks into his campaign, Jindal had visited Iowa four times. Jindal stated that he viewed directly hearing from voters as the "only way to connect" with them. By October, Jindal had held 96 events in the state in just 55 days.

The Jindal campaign noted that the candidate had a high favorability rating among potential Republican voters that were surveyed. A poll on July 22 showed Jindal was favored by these voters 51–7. Wes Anderson wrote in an announcement of Jindal's favorability among voters in the state, "Bottom line, Gov. Jindal has taken off in Iowa. No other candidate has seen as much positive movement as Jindal." On September 1, Iowa pollster J. Ann Selzer called Jindal the "hidden winner" for increasing his favorability rating by 18 points since the last sampling which she attributed to his increased profile, though noted it was not translating into votes, adding, "He's kind of lurking there as having some upside potential." In early November, Jindal was also found to have a 60% favorability in Iowa, the third highest, only behind Ben Carson and Ted Cruz.

Jindal's polling in the state throughout the entirety of his campaign ranged from the bottom of the field to average. A late July poll showed Jindal in fourth place, tied with Ben Carson. On November 2, 2015, a poll was released with Jindal faring better than he had previously been doing at 6%, noted by The Hill as being higher than Jeb Bush who had consistently been polling superior to Jindal since the announcement of his campaign months prior. On November 13, Jindal said the poll was the result of him having visited all of the state's counties and reported that his campaign was allowing everyone to ask questions, even sacrificing time for their participation.

Despite low polling, Jindal publicly retained confidence in how he would fare in Iowa. In October 2015, Jindal said he believed his campaign was "doing very well" in the state and that he believed the race would change after the Iowa caucus. In addition, he predicted that he would win the state, which would "propel us forward to the nomination". Former Iowa Republican political director Craig Robinson thought the campaign marched around the state instead of with its denizens.

Had Jindal's prediction been correct, and he had won the state in February, his campaign would have been faced with having to use the victory to win the nomination, despite lacking in funds when compared to other competitors within the field.

=== New Hampshire ===
The day after announcing his campaign, June 25, Jindal traveled to New Hampshire, delivering a speech and insisting that he would return to the state the following weekend. In June, Jindal was shown to have a 26% favorability rating among voters in New Hampshire. On September 24, a CNN/WMUR poll was released showing Jindal had increased in unfavorable opinion within New Hampshire by 14 points since that time, his favorability having dropped by a single point. Jindal's last campaign trip to New Hampshire was on August 19, appearing at the state's annual Education Summit. Within the last three months of his campaign, Jindal did not visit New Hampshire, filing for the Republican Primary in the state on November 16, the day before announcing that he was suspending his campaign.

== Suspension of campaign ==
On November 16, 2015, Jindal visited Cheyenne, Wyoming as part of a broader tour of western states. Among the items on his agenda for the Cheyenne visit was a meeting with a wealthy Republican donor. Present at the meeting were the donor, Jindal, at least one of his campaign staffers, and 3-4 other people. According to one person who was at the meeting, Jindal made a good case for his chances to be successful in the Republican primaries in the spring of 2016. However, one day later Jindal announced that he suspended his campaign. Stating that "This is not my time", he cited lack of traction, fundraising shortage, and difficulties accessing the primetime stage. On February 5, 2016, Jindal endorsed Florida Senator Marco Rubio for the Republican nomination, calling Rubio a "principled conservative" and "consistent about strengthening America's foreign policy."

== Endorsements ==
Bobby Jindal endorsements

State legislators

- Iowa State Representative: Matt Windschitl (Speaker pro tem)

Celebrities, commentators, and activists

- Blaise Hazelwood (get out the vote expert at Grassroots Targeting, worked at the RNC)
- Timmy Teepell (consultant at OnMessage and former Jindal chief of staff)
- Willie Robertson, TV personality
- Kevin Sorbo, actor
