= Voter Vault =

The Voter Vault is a database of voters in the United States used by the Republican Party. Construction started in the 1990s, and it was first used in 2002. By 2004 it had about 168 million entries. By around 2019 it had been renamed GOP Data Center.

== See also ==
- Cambridge Analytica
- Catalist
- Civis Analytics
- Data dredging
- Get out the vote
- Herd behaviour
- Right-wing politics
- Predictive analytics
- Psychographic
- Timshel
