= Narrowcasting =

Dissemination of information or marketing to a narrow audience

Narrowcasting is the dissemination of information to a specialised audience, rather than to the broader public-at-large. It is the opposite of broadcasting. It may refer to advertising or programming via radio, podcast, newspaper, television, or the Internet. The term "multicast" is sometimes used interchangeably, although strictly speaking this refers to the technology used, and narrowcasting to the business model. Narrowcasting is sometimes aimed at paid subscribers, such as in the case of cable television.

== History and terminology ==
The evolution of narrowcasting came from broadcasting. In the early 20th century, Charles Herrold designated radio transmissions meant for a single receiver, distinguished from broadcasting, meant for a general audience. Merriam-Webster reports the first known use of the word in 1932. Narrowcasting was revived in the context of subscription radio programs in the late 1940s, after which the term narrowcasting entered the common lexicon due to computer scientist and public broadcasting advocate J. C. R. Licklider, who in a 1967 report envisioned

...a multiplicity of television networks aimed at serving the needs of smaller, specialized audiences. 'Here,' stated Licklider, 'I should like to coin the term "narrowcasting," using it to emphasize the rejection or dissolution of the constraints imposed by commitment to a monolithic mass-appeal, broadcast approach.'

The term "multicast" is sometimes used interchangeably, although strictly speaking this refers to the technology used, and narrowcasting to the business model. Narrowcasting is sometimes aimed at paid subscribers, such as in the case of cable television.

=== In television ===
In the beginning of the 1990s, when American television was still mainly ruled by three major networks (ABC, CBS and NBC), it was believed that the greatest achievement was to promote and create content that would be directed towards a huge mass of people, avoiding completely those projects that might appeal to only a reduced audience. That was mainly due to the fact that especially in the earlier days of television, there was not much more competition. Nevertheless, this changed once independent stations, more cable channels, and the success of videocassettes started increasing and rising, which gave the audiences the possibility of having more options. Thus, this previous mass-oriented point of view started to change towards one that was, obviously, narrower.

It was the arrival of cable television that allowed a much larger number of producers and programmers to aim at smaller audiences, such as MTV, which started off as the channel for those who loved music.

Narrowcasting has made its place in, for example, the way television networks schedule shows; while one night they might choose to stream shows directed at teenagers, a different night they might want to focus on another specific kind of audience, such as those interested in documentaries. In this way, they target what could be seen as a narrow audience, but collect their attention altogether as a mass audience on one night.

== Uses ==
=== Advertising ===
Related to niche marketing or target marketing, narrowcasting involves aiming media messages at specific segments of the public defined by values, preferences, demographic attributes, or subscription. Narrowcasting is based on the postmodern idea that mass audiences do not exist.

Marketing experts are often interested in narrowcast media as a commercial advertising tool, since access to such content implies exposure to a specific and clearly defined prospective consumer audience. The theory being that, by identifying particular demographics viewing such programs, advertisers can better target their markets. Pre-recorded television programs are often broadcast to captive audiences in taxi cabs, buses, elevators, and queues. For instance, the Cabvision network in London's black cabs shows limited pre-recorded television programs interspersed with targeted advertising to cab passengers. Point of sale advertising is a form of narrowcasting.

Interactive narrowcasting allows users to interact with products or services via touch screens or other technology, thus allowing them to interact with them before purchasing them.

=== Political uses ===
Narrowcasting has become increasingly used to target audiences with a particular political leaning, such as political satire by the entertainment industry. It has been often pointed out that Donald Trump used narrowcasting as well as broadcasting to good effect.

=== Other uses ===
The term narrowcasting can also apply to the spread of information to an audience (private or public) which is by nature geographically limited—a group such as office employees, military troops, or conference attendees—and requires a localised dissemination of information from a shared source. Hotels, hospitals, museums, and offices, use narrowcasting to display relevant information to their visitors and staff.

== Internet ==
Both broadcasting and narrowcasting models are found on the Internet. Sites based on the latter require the user to register an account and log in before viewing content. Narrowcasting may also employ various types of push technologies, which send information directly to subscribers; electronic mailing lists, where emails are sent to subscribers, are an example of these.

Narrowcasting is also sometimes applied to podcasting, since the audience for a podcast is often specific and sharply defined.

== Social impact ==
=== Positive ===
This evolution towards narrowcasting was discussed in 1993 by Hamid Naficy, who focused on this change specifically in Los Angeles, and how such a content directed towards a narrowed audience affected social culture. For example, with the rise of Middle Eastern television programs, more content that did not have the pressure to have a mass audience appeal to watch it was able to be produced and promoted. This made it easier for minorities to feel better represented in television.

=== Negative ===
Narrowcasting by definition focuses on specific groups of people, which may promote division or even conflict among groups. Political, social, or other ideologies promoted by narrowcasting have the potential to cause harm to society.

There is also the danger of people living in a filter bubble, where the audience is not exposed to different viewpoints, opinions or ideologies, leading to thinking that their opinion is the correct one. The resulting narrow-mindedness can lead to conflict.

== In the arts ==
The 2022 Australian sci-fi thriller Monolith, in which the sole on-screen actor is a podcaster, provides commentary on narrowcasting. Ari Mattes of Notre Dame University wrote in an article in The Conversation: "Monolith is one of the first Australian films to critically navigate the ramifications of narrowcasting technology... the strange solitude of interpersonal communication in the global information economy underpins the whole thing".

== See also ==
- Affinity fraud
- Data aggregator
- False dilemma
- Microtargeting
- Personalcasting
- Social sorting
- Targeted advertising
- Video blog
