= Sea FM =

Former Australian radio network

Hit Network (Sea FM)
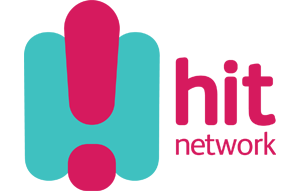

Australia
- Broadcast area: Queensland and New South Wales
- Frequency: Various

Programming
- Format: Top 40 (CHR)

Ownership
- Owner: Southern Cross Austereo

Sea FM was an Australian radio network, consisting of stations in Queensland and NSW owned by Southern Cross Austereo. Some Sea FM stations were later sold to meet media ownership requirements. Prime Television Limited purchased Sea FM Townsville in Queensland and Grant Broadcasters purchased Sea FM stations in Devonport and Burnie in Tasmania. All Sea FM stations currently owned by Southern Cross Austereo except Cairns, Mackay and Rockhampton / Gladstone, are part of the Hit Network after Southern Cross Media merged with Austereo.

== History ==
The Sea FM brand name and logo was created by Gold Coast Broadcasters for one station 90.9 Sea FM after the Gold Coast was granted a new commercial FM licence.

90.9 Sea FM began broadcasting in 1989 with programming consulted by Austereo.

The original Sea FM on-air line-up was a strong team of experienced Announcers, many having made their name previously in capital city radio including - Craig Bruce (FOX FM) & Sammy Power, Ian 'Lofty' Fulton (4IP), Grahame "Durry" Rodgers (2SM & 2NX), Sue Moses (2MMM & Channel 10), Gregg Easton (2UW & 4BK), Joe Miller (3XY & EON FM), Dean Miller and Simon Franks. In the same year the Gold Coast's existing AM station 4GG was granted permission to convert to FM as 92.5 4GGG (later KROQ).

In the early 1990s Gold Coast Broadcasters purchased KROQ and also Sunshine Coast Broadcasters' 92.7 Mix FM on the Sunshine Coast in 1995. The Sunshine Coast's 91.9 Sea FM was subsequently launched as a supplementary licence.

Gold Coast Broadcasters later became known as RG Capital with financial backing provided by Australian Media Tycoon Reg Grundy.

With the further purchase of existing radio stations and the launch of newly granted supplementary FM licences, RG Capital expanded the Sea FM brand name and logo throughout Queensland, New South Wales, Victoria and Tasmania. In 2004, RG Capital sold their regional stations to Macquarie Regional RadioWorks (now Southern Cross Austereo). Following RG Capital's purchase by Macquarie Regional Radioworks, RG Capital's FM stations in Victoria were rebranded to Star FM.

In 2013, the Grant Broadcasters owned and operated 99.7 Sea FM in Scottsdale, Tasmania dropped the Sea FM branding and relaunched as Chilli FM, bringing it in line with sister station 90.1 Chilli FM Launceston.

Also in 2013, Southern Cross Austereo offloaded both Sea FM and Mix FM on the Sunshine Coast to EON Broadcasters who paid $17.7million for the stations in a forced sale following a technical breach which occurred in 2011, when the Austereo and Southern Cross networks merged. The merger resulted in the same company owning too many radio assets in a region where two markets (Brisbane and the Sunshine Coast) overlapped, prompting the Australian Communications and Media Authority to force the company to sell two of its assets.

In February 2016, Southern Cross Austereo owned and operated 100.9 Sea FM in Hobart, Tasmania dropped the Sea FM branding and relaunched as Hit 100.9, bringing it inline with other stations to the Hit Network.

It was announced in September 2016, that all Sea FM stations would be rebranded in December 2016 to hit branding.

However, the company decided that the flagship Sea FM station on the Gold Coast & Sea FM Central Coast in Gosford would retain the Sea FM name but adopted the brand and feel of the Hit Network, including the elements of the Hit logo (like Fox FM & 2Day FM).

While Sea FM in Maryborough dropped the name in favour of hit101.9 Fraser Coast, the station in Bundaberg retained the name of Sea FM as changing to Hit Network branding, such as hit93.1, would have been too similar to Hitz939, the existing Grant Broadcasters station in Bundaberg which has been broadcasting to the Wide Bay region since 1993.

The Sea FM station on the Sunshine Coast also retained the Sea FM branding, as it is no longer part of the Southern Cross Austereo network and therefore didn't partake in the Hit Network re-branding.

On 12 July 2019, SCA announced the Gold Coast’s Sea FM would rebrand becoming Hit90.9 from 29 July 2019, bringing all their remaining Sea-branded stations under the 'Hit' brand.

In August 2021, Hit90.9 was rebranded back to Sea FM.

== Programming ==
The network's stations are aimed at the under 40's section of the market, playing Top 40 and popular music. Most stations provide local breakfast and daytime programming, and also include a variety of networked programmes.

== Current Sea FM branded stations ==
=== Queensland ===
- 4SEE 91.9 MHz Maroochydore/Sunshine Coast (now owned and operated by EON Broadcasting)

=== Tasmania ===
- 7DDD 107.7 FM – Devonport, Tasmania (owned by ARN)
- 7SEA 101.7 FM – Burnie, Tasmania (owned by ARN)

== Former Sea FM-branded stations ==
=== New South Wales ===
- 2CFM 101.3 MHz Gosford/Central Coast (owned and operated by Southern Cross Austereo)

=== Queensland ===
- 4SEA 90.9 MHz Gold Coast (now 90.9 Sea FM)
- 4RGC 99.5 MHz Cairns (now Triple M Cairns)
- 4CEE 101.9 MHz Maryborough (now hit101.9 Fraser Coast)
- 4RGK 101.5 MHz Rockhampton/95.1 MHz Gladstone (now Triple M Central Queensland)
- 4RGM 98.7 MHz Mackay (now Triple M Mackay & The Whitsundays)
- 4RGD 100.7 MHz Toowoomba Originally part of the Sea FM network, the station changed to Hot FM in 2013 before becoming Hit South Queensland in 2016.
- 4RGR 100.7 MHz Townsville (now owned by ARN) The station changed to Zinc upon Prime buying the station in 2009 before becoming Power100 in 2016.
- 4RGB 93.1 MHz Bundaberg (Now Triple M Bundaberg)

=== Tasmania ===
- 7TTT 100.9 MHz Hobart, Tasmania (now hit100.9 Hobart)

=== Victoria ===
- 3SEA 94.3 MHz and 97.9 MHz Gippsland (later Star FM, now hit94.3 MHz and 97.9 Gippsland)
