= The Rush Hour (Triple M) =

Australian sports and comedy drive radio program

- Other names: The Rush Hour with JB and Billy; The Rush Hour with Maroon, Hindy & Millie (NSW); The Rush Hour with Dobbo & Elliott (QLD)
- Genre: Sports talk Comedy
- Running time: 120 minutes (including commercial breaks)
- Country of origin: Australia
- Language: English
- Home station: Triple M Melbourne (105.1 FM)
- Syndicates: Triple M Adelaide; Triple M Perth; Triple M Hobart; Triple M Sydney (local NSW edition); Triple M Brisbane (local QLD edition); Triple M Regional network
- Hosted by: VIC / SA / WA / TAS (AFL Flagship): James Brayshaw (AFL season); Billy Brownless; Dale "Daisy" Thomas (pre- and post-season); New South Wales: Anthony Maroon; Nathan Hindmarsh; Millie Elliott; Queensland: Ben Dobbin; Elliott Lovejoy; Former local editions: See Local and interstate editions
- Announcer: Ryan "Rabs" Warren (anchor, Melbourne flagship)
- Produced by: Matthew Haywood (audio); Natalie Herbstreit; Tom Beers (digital/social)
- Executive producer: Ryan Warren
- Recording studio: South Melbourne, Victoria (flagship); Sydney, New South Wales; Brisbane, Queensland
- Original release: April 2010
- Audio format: Stereophonic sound
- Opening theme: "Living in America" by James Brown
- Ending theme: "Ça Plane Pour Moi" by Plastic Bertrand "Wooly Bully" by Sam the Sham and the Pharaohs
- Podcast: LiSTNR

The Rush Hour (billed in southern and western markets as The Rush Hour with JB and Billy) is an Australian drive-time sports and comedy radio program broadcast on the Triple M network, owned by Southern Cross Austereo (SCA). Originating from Triple M Melbourne in April 2010, the flagship program is co-hosted by television presenter and former cricketer James Brayshaw alongside former AFL footballer Billy Brownless, with Ryan "Rabs" Warren serving as panel anchor and executive producer. Brayshaw co-hosts the program throughout the AFL season, while former Collingwood and Carlton player Dale "Daisy" Thomas regularly fills in alongside Brownless prior to and following the football season each year.

While the Melbourne flagship originally served Victorian audiences, SCA has periodically expanded The Rush Hour title into a network-wide brand featuring state-based drive programs across mainland capital cities and regional markets. In January 2025, Triple M consolidated its AFL-market drive programming by syndicating the Melbourne broadcast with Brayshaw and Brownless across Victoria, Tasmania, South Australia (Triple M Adelaide), and Western Australia (Triple M Perth). Following the departure of Marty Sheargold from the network in February 2025, Triple M reinstated separate NRL-focused editions of The Rush Hour across New South Wales and Queensland in April 2025.

== History ==
=== Origins and early years (2010–2017) ===
The program premiered in April 2010 on 105.1 Triple M Melbourne as a three-day-a-week sports entertainment show airing Tuesday to Thursday alongside the 2010 AFL season, with actor Hugh Jackman appearing as the show's inaugural guest, before expanding into a five-day weekday strip in 2011. Dave "Higgo" Higgins served as the program's inaugural anchor, later succeeded in the anchor chair by Dave "Dangerous" Williams.

During this era, the show served as an afternoon bridge between daytime rock music shifts and evening sports programming, operating across two-hour slots between 3:00 pm and 6:00 pm. Regular on-air contributors included AFL and media figures such as Brian Taylor, Jason Dunstall, Danny Frawley, Damian Barrett, Wayne Carey, and Brigitte Duclos.

=== Timeslot movements and Kennedy Molloy era (2018–2021) ===
In 2017, ahead of the launch of Triple M's nationally networked drive show Kennedy Molloy, The Rush Hour shifted to a 3:00–5:00 pm slot (with a "Best Of" hour from 5:00–6:00 pm) before moving into an early-afternoon timeslot from 2:00 pm to 4:00 pm in 2018. That same year, former Mount Gambier breakfast announcer Ryan "Rabs" Warren joined the show as anchor, while Gill Goode succeeded Whitney Plowman on the production team after Plowman moved to Kennedy Molloy.

In December 2019, Southern Cross Austereo announced that The Rush Hour with Brayshaw and Brownless would move to a one-hour early-evening timeslot from 6:00 pm to 7:00 pm weekdays for the 2020 season, immediately following Kennedy Molloy. Despite the shortened broadcast runtime across 2020 and 2021—which coincided with sporting disruptions during the COVID-19 pandemic—the program maintained strong digital listenership through its daily catch-up podcast on SCA's LiSTNR platform.

=== Return to drive and national brand expansion (2022–2024) ===
Following Mick Molloy's departure from the national drive slot at the end of 2021, Triple M unveiled a localised drive strategy for 2022 under The Rush Hour banner. The Rush Hour with JB and Billy returned to the 4:00–6:00 pm weekday drive slot across Melbourne, regional Victoria, and Hobart, while state-specific Rush Hour drive shows aired in Sydney, Brisbane, Adelaide, and Perth.

=== AFL-state syndication and NSW/QLD relaunch (2025–present) ===
In November 2024, SCA announced a major restructuring of its Triple M drive schedule for 2025, ending the local Adelaide, Perth, Sydney, and Brisbane editions of The Rush Hour. Commencing in January 2025, the Melbourne broadcast of The Rush Hour with JB and Billy was networked from 4:00 pm to 6:00 pm across Melbourne, Hobart, Adelaide, Perth, and Triple M's regional stations throughout Victoria, Tasmania, South Australia, and Western Australia. The flagship program also transitioned to a four-day live broadcast schedule airing Monday to Thursday, with Fridays (often billed on the podcast feed as The Best of Triple M's Rush Hour) and Sundays (The Rush Hour Sunday Session) featuring highlight compilations alongside pre-recorded segments such as the Fat's On Fire Quiz.

In New South Wales and Queensland, Triple M initially replaced its local Rush Hour shows with an extended 4:00–6:00 pm drive edition of The Marty Sheargold Show. However, on 26 February 2025, Sheargold and SCA parted ways following public backlash—and a subsequent Australian Communications and Media Authority (ACMA) decency breach finding—over on-air comments Sheargold made regarding the Matildas.

In April 2025, SCA revived The Rush Hour brand in its northern markets, launching two new NRL-focused 4:00–6:00 pm weekday drive programs on 28 April 2025: The Rush Hour with Maroon, Hindy & Millie across metro and regional New South Wales, and The Rush Hour with Dobbo & Elliott across metro and regional Queensland. In June 2025, Triple M introduced the national early-drive program Lu & Jarch (hosted by Luisa Dal Din and Jack Archdale) in the 2:00–4:00 pm slot as the national lead-in to the state Rush Hour broadcasts.

== Local and interstate editions ==
Prior to and alongside the 2022–2024 national drive strategy, several interstate Triple M stations produced local afternoon or drive sports programs under The Rush Hour banner:

- Adelaide: The Rush Hour with Bernie, Blewey & Jars—hosted by Bernie Vince, Greg Blewett, and Andrew Jarman—launched on 104.7 Triple M Adelaide in October 2016 as a 6:00–7:00 pm weekday program before moving into the 4:00–6:00 pm drive slot from 2022 until November 2024.
- Perth: 92.9 Triple M Perth launched Triple M's Rush Hour WA on 22 February 2021 with sports presenter Lachy Reid and former West Coast Eagles premiership player Andrew Embley. In 2022, Embley was paired with Michelle Anderson for The Rush Hour with Embers & Michelle, before Katie Lamb joined Embley for The Rush Hour with Embers & Katie Lamb across 2023 and 2024. Lamb subsequently moved to Triple M Perth's breakfast show alongside Xavier Ellis in late 2024.
- Sydney and New South Wales: An early-evening Sydney edition hosted by Mark Geyer ("MG") and Anthony Maroon aired during the mid-to-late 2010s. From 2022 to 2024, Saturday morning program Dead Set Legends transitioned into the weekday 4:00–6:00 pm drive slot on 104.9 Triple M Sydney and regional NSW stations as The Rush Hour with Gus, Jude & Wendell, hosted by Gus Worland, Jude Bolton, and Wendell Sailor. Following Marty Sheargold's exit in early 2025, The Rush Hour returned to NSW drive on 28 April 2025 as The Rush Hour with Maroon, Hindy & Millie, hosted by Anthony Maroon, Nathan Hindmarsh, and NRLW player Millie Elliott, alongside rotating panellists Adam Peacock, Sam Bremner, and Keeley Davis.
- Brisbane and Queensland: 104.5 Triple M Brisbane and 92.5 Gold FM previously aired The Rush Hour with Luke, Dobbo & Margaux Parker (hosted by Luke Bradnam, Ben Dobbin, and Margaux Parker) in the 3:00–6:00 pm drive slot until the program was replaced by Kennedy Molloy at the end of 2018; Bradnam continued hosting a Gold Coast Rush Hour shift until December 2020. From January 2022 to late 2024, South East Queensland stations aired The Rush Hour with Leisel, Liam & Dobbo, hosted by Olympic swimmer Leisel Jones, Liam Flanagan, and Ben Dobbin, while Annabelle "A.B." Brett and Elliott Lovejoy hosted a regional Queensland edition. Following the axing of the Brisbane drive show at the end of 2024, Jones and Flanagan moved to the breakfast program on 92.5 Triple M Gold alongside Peter "Spida" Everitt in January 2025, while The Rush Hour with Dobbo & Elliott launched across metro and regional Queensland drive on 28 April 2025, co-hosted by Dobbin and Lovejoy with rotating NRLW contributors including Ali Brigginshaw, Romy Teitzel, Jaime Chapman, and Mackenzie Weale.

Market	Station(s)	Years active	Presenters	Status / Successor programming
Melbourne (Flagship)	Triple M Melbourne	2010–present	James Brayshaw (AFL season), Billy Brownless, and Dale "Daisy" Thomas (pre-/post-season)	Ongoing; syndicated to TAS, SA, and WA
Adelaide	Triple M Adelaide	2016–2024	Bernie Vince, Greg Blewett, and Andrew Jarman	Replaced by Melbourne Rush Hour broadcast (2025–present)
Perth	Triple M Perth	2021–2024	Lachy Reid and Andrew Embley (2021); Andrew Embley and Michelle Anderson (2022); Andrew Embley and Katie Lamb (2023–2024)	Replaced by Melbourne Rush Hour broadcast (2025–present)
Sydney / NSW	Triple M Sydney & Regional NSW	2010s 2022–2024; 2025–present	Mark Geyer and Anthony Maroon (2010s); Gus Worland, Jude Bolton, and Wendell Sailor (2022–2024); Anthony Maroon, Nathan Hindmarsh, and Millie Elliott (2025–present)	Briefly replaced by The Marty Sheargold Show (Jan–Feb 2025); relaunched April 2025
Brisbane / QLD	Triple M Brisbane, 92.5 Triple M Gold & Regional QLD	–2018; 2022–2024; 2025–present	Luke Bradnam, Ben Dobbin, and Margaux Parker (–2018); Leisel Jones, Liam Flanagan, and Ben Dobbin (2022–2024); Ben Dobbin and Elliott Lovejoy (2025–present)	Briefly replaced by The Marty Sheargold Show (Jan–Feb 2025); relaunched April 2025

== On-air dynamic and television ties ==
The Melbourne flagship's comedic identity is built around a traditional double act format featuring a straight man and comic foil partnership. Brayshaw assumes the role of the polished lead broadcaster and straight man—drawing on his background as a first-class cricketer, sports commentator with the Seven Network, and former chairman of the North Melbourne Football Club—while former Geelong key forward Brownless plays a self-deprecating comic foil known for on-air malapropisms, country football yarns, and exaggerated personal grievances.

The broadcast carries over the informal locker-room dynamic established by Brayshaw and Brownless during their tenure co-hosting the Nine Network's The AFL Footy Show and Triple M's weekend AFL commentary coverage, with the production booth frequently deploying comedic soundboard stingers, crowd groans, and musical cues to highlight Brownless's on-air stumbles. Rather than editing out broadcasting errors, the show treats Brownless's flawed preparation, commercial voiceover booth outtakes, and botched questions (mocked on-air via monikers such as "Segments Brownless", "Interviews Brownless", and "Craft Brownless") as its primary comedic hook.

On air, Brayshaw and anchor Ryan "Rabs" Warren frequently address Brownless by his formal legal name ("Anthony" or "Anthony William Brownless") alongside nicknames such as "Fat" and "September Bins" (or "Bins", mocking his winless record in four VFL/AFL Grand Finals with Geelong in 1989, 1992, 1994, and 1995), while Brownless addresses Brayshaw as "Jim" or "Jimmy boy". Other recurring in-jokes across the program's 17 seasons include Brownless earning the nickname "Cheezel", mispronouncing Brayshaw's name as "Jing", mangling band, landmark, and celebrity names—such as "Def Leffelin" (Def Leppard), "Mount Palomaranas" (Mount Panorama), "Jomo Lomu" (Jonah Lomu), and spelling George W. Bush's middle initial "W" with an "R" ("George Rubble You Bush")—and Brayshaw complaining about being trapped in the studio "airlock" with Brownless or catching him stealing cans of Coke Zero from the studio fridge.

Because Brayshaw only co-hosts the program during the AFL season (typically from late February or early March until the conclusion of the AFL finals series in late September or early October), former AFL player Dale "Daisy" Thomas has served since October 2023 as Brownless's regular co-host during the pre-season and post-season months each year; prior to Thomas, former St Kilda captain Nick Riewoldt ("Rooey") and Brigitte Duclos regularly filled in during Brayshaw's off-season hiatus.

== Production and on-air contributors ==
The Melbourne broadcast relies heavily on banter between the hosts and their studio production crew, who regularly feature on-air as foils to Brownless:

- Ryan "Rabs" Warren: Executive producer and panel anchor since 2018. Warren directs broadcast pacing, segment timing, and structural links into and out of commercial breaks, and operates the closing theme buttons for Billy's Joke.
- Matthew "Matty in the Booth" Haywood: Audio producer and sound engineer operating from the studio booth, responsible for live audio drops, soundboard stings, and remixing weekly blooper packages and parody songs.
- Natalie "Herbie" Herbstreit: Producer and regular on-air contributor who presents segments featuring listener feedback and social media reactions, and fills in as panel anchor when Warren is on leave.
- Tom "Beersy" Beers: Digital and social producer managing the program's online video cuts and listener interactions.

Former senior and executive producers who also contributed regularly on-air include Sam Cavanagh, Whitney Plowman, Gill "Gilly" Goode, and veteran Triple M producer Rosie Walton, who presented listener social-media feedback segments and uncovered Brownless's commercial booth outtakes prior to moving to Triple M Melbourne's breakfast show.

== Show format and recurring segments ==
=== Broadcast structure ===
The Melbourne flagship blends sports journalism—primarily focused on the AFL and Australian cricket—with talkback listener interaction, athlete and celebrity interviews, and comedy. A standard two-hour live broadcast (4:00–6:00 pm Monday to Thursday) follows a consistent daily structure:

- First hour (4:00–5:00 pm): Opens with James Brown's "Living in America", followed by unscripted opening banter dissecting Brownless's pre-show routine and Billy's All Sports Report ("the wrappy"). The remainder of the hour typically features breaking football or cricket analysis with an in-studio reporter (such as Damo's Recovery Session on Mondays or Mitch Cleary on Wednesdays) and a 13 33 53 listener talkback topic (Topics Brownless / Brayshaw / Thomas or Monday Brag Artist).
- Second hour (5:00–6:00 pm): Anchored by a long-form interview with an athlete, coach, or entertainment guest, alongside the show's marquee daily comedy or quiz segments (such as 5 at 5:05, Billy's Hump Day Quiz on Wednesdays, The Idiot File on Thursdays, Craft Brownless, or Wacky World of William), before concluding immediately prior to the 6:00 pm news bulletin with Billy's Joke.

=== Current segments ===
- Billy's All Sports Report: The opening daily sports news wrap (colloquially referred to on-air by the hosts and in episode chapters as the "wrappy"), delivering a digest of domestic and international sporting headlines, frequently derailed by Brownless mispronouncing athlete names or Brayshaw and Thomas questioning his pre-show activities.
- Topics Brownless / Brayshaw / Thomas: An open talkback segment in which Brownless, Brayshaw, or fill-in co-host Dale Thomas introduces an everyday or unusual discussion prompt and invites listeners ("the Rush Hour Family") to call in on 13 33 53 to share stories for promotional prizes. A signature spin-off prompt is Brownless's grammatical catchphrase, "What have you seen... unusual?!"
- The Idiot File (also The Vidiot File) and Billy's Idiot Song: A weekly montage broadcast on Thursdays (or Fridays prior to the show's move to a four-day live week) featuring bloopers, spoonerisms, misread live commercials, and malapropisms made by Brownless across the week's broadcasts, punctuated between clips by the sound effect of a beer can cracking open. Filmed in-studio video compilations of the segment are published on YouTube as The Vidiot File, while audio producer Matthew Haywood also periodically produces Billy's Idiot Song, splicing Brownless's vocal stumbles (such as mispronouncing "walrus" as "war-rus" over The Beatles' "I Am the Walrus") into popular music tracks.
- Wacky World of William: A recurring segment in which Brownless presents bizarre, offbeat, or strange human-interest news stories from around the world.
- Billy's Bake and Billy's Letters: A recurring editorial rant in which Brownless vents frustration regarding sporting controversies (such as his 2013 Ashes "bake" of English cricketer Stuart Broad or the Australian Football Hall of Fame), rule changes, sports administrators, or minor everyday grievances. A related recurring bit is Billy's Letters, in which Brownless reads aloud open letters penned to AFL players such as Zak Butters and Toby Greene.
- Billy's Hump Day Quiz: A Wednesday trivia competition in which two telephone callers compete head-to-head answering sports and general knowledge questions read by Brownless, with humour derived from disputed answers, callers bantering with the hosts, and Brownless stumbling over or abandoning questions mid-sentence.
- 5 at 5:05 (or Bill's 5 at 5:05): A countdown list segment presenting five topical or humorous sports talking points, often reviewing weekend football moments or commentary calls, with a running gag that the segment frequently airs well past 5:05 pm.
- Craft Brownless / Craft Attack (also Craft Thomas): An audio-production comedy segment in which the hosts and producers splice audio grabs of athletes, commentators, or co-hosts into music tracks or parody sketches.
- Fat's On Fire Quiz (also Fat Is On Fire Quiz): A recurring quiz segment—featured in the Friday edition—in which Brownless and the team attempt to answer all 20 questions from the Herald Sun daily quiz.
- Guernsey Cash: An on-air listener competition in which callers attempt to rapidly identify a sequence of AFL players from their guernsey numbers within a strict time limit to win a $10,000 cash prize.
- Monday Brag Artist (and Reverse Brag Artist): A Monday listener call-in segment celebrating callers' niche personal achievements (or self-deprecating failures in Reverse Brag Artist), punctuated by the chorus of "Unbelievable" by EMF.
- Damo's Recovery Session: A Monday analysis segment during the AFL season featuring journalist Damian Barrett dissecting weekend matches, coaching pressures, and match review findings.
- The FAFMAs: An annual late-season satirical awards segment (Fat's Australian Football Media Awards) presented by Brownless as a parody of the Australian Football Media Association (AFMA) Awards.
- Billy's Joke: The traditional final segment at the conclusion of each broadcast, in which Brownless reads a joke from a printed sheet—frequently embellishing the setup with unnecessary tangential details while Brayshaw interrupts to question the premise or distance himself from the material. When a joke is deemed funny (referred to on-air as "getting Plastic"), panel anchor Ryan Warren plays out the show with Plastic Bertrand's "Ça Plane Pour Moi"; when a joke falls flat, it triggers Sam the Sham and the Pharaohs' "Wooly Bully". When Warren awards "Plastic" to a risqué joke over Brayshaw's objections, Brayshaw routinely threatens to have station technicians move the button to his side of the desk while Brownless derides him as a "wet blanket" and "sad sack"; achieving a clean sweep of "Plastic" across an entire week is celebrated by Brownless as a rare milestone. Several of Brownless's most notorious jokes—such as his May 2020 "Wooden Eye" joke (in which he ad-libbed a schoolboy "shotgunning a CC and Dry at the school dance" for Dutch courage), "Feather, Droplet, and Brick", "Wrinkliest" (noted for its three-minute setup), and "Dishes"—have become recurring callbacks in the show's archive specials.
- Todd from Barwon Heads: A recurring running gag featuring rapid-fire prank phone calls from a caller who poses under a fake name and suburb before revealing himself as "Todd from Barwon Heads" and delivering a brief one-line insult to Brownless (such as calling him "the greatest finals flop in the greater Geelong area") before immediately hanging up.

=== Guest contributors and celebrity interviews ===
During the AFL season, the program features a rotating roster of regular football journalists, commentators, coaches, and players, including Damian Barrett on Mondays, Seven Network football reporters Mitch Cleary and Xander McGuire on Wednesdays and during trade periods (succeeding Herald Sun chief football writer Jay "Jay Z" Clark, who presented Jay Z's Footy Headlines through 2024), Jason Dunstall ("The Chief"), Brian Taylor, Nathan Brown, cricket and football commentator Mark Howard, and former jockey Glen Boss. Memorable football guest segments replayed in the program's Rush Hour Vault series include St Kilda midfielder Jack Sinclair completing a newspaper crossword live on air with Brownless, North Melbourne forward Nick Larkey performing impersonations of AFL personalities, and Brownless recounting former Geelong coach Malcolm Blight throwing a VHS tape at his head during a match review.

The show also served as a long-running platform for former St Kilda captain and commentator Danny Frawley ("Spud"). Following Frawley's death in September 2019, Brayshaw, Brownless, Damian Barrett, and Nathan Brown dedicated special tribute broadcasts to his impact on Triple M and the football community.

Beyond Australian rules football, The Rush Hour has hosted numerous international athletes, actors, and comedians. In one of the program's most replayed archival segments from its early years, American actress Jennifer Coolidge visited the studio and re-enacted her "Stifler's Mom" pool-table seduction scene from the 1999 comedy film American Pie with a flustered Brownless. Other prominent guests across the show's history include inaugural guest Hugh Jackman, NBA Hall of Famer Shaquille O'Neal, American rapper Snoop Dogg, Formula One driver Oscar Piastri, British actor and author Stephen Fry (who debated the 2023 Ashes Jonny Bairstow stumping incident on air), actors David Hasselhoff and Jeremy Piven, ventriloquist David Strassman, and comedians Bill Bailey, Ross Noble, Sam Pang, Hamish & Andy, and Rob Sitch.

=== Former segments ===
- Fat N Skinny's Ad Agency: A recurring comedy sketch segment from the program's first decade in which Brownless ("Fat") and Brayshaw ("Skinny") pitched mock radio advertisements for local businesses.
- Suburban Song: A musical parody segment from the 2010s in which the team wrote and performed tribute songs celebrating and roasting specific Melbourne suburbs, such as Croydon, Point Cook, Collingwood, and North Melbourne.
- Billy Watches The Bachelor with Sam Wood: A recurring reality-television recap and fitness segment featuring former The Bachelor star Sam Wood, who also put Brownless through gym sessions.
- The Midweek Rub: A Wednesday panel discussion dissecting AFL news with Triple M commentary team members, which was later spun off into a standalone podcast feature within the Triple M Footy feed.
- Billy's Quote of the Day: A short-lived feature in which Brownless read inspirational or philosophical quotations, routinely dismissed by Brayshaw.

== Live events, stunts and outside broadcasts ==
Ryan "Rabs" Warren, James Brayshaw, and Billy Brownless hosting a live outside broadcast of The Rush Hour at the Lower Plenty Hotel in 2023

The program regularly stages outside broadcasts (OBs) from suburban and regional pubs across Victoria in front of live audiences. A flagship annual event is the "Grand Final Rumble" (and "Triple M Fest"), held on the Thursday prior to the AFL Grand Final at Melbourne venues such as The Precinct Hotel in Richmond or the Corner Hotel in Richmond. The broadcast features appearances from AFL players and coaches (such as Max Gawn, Josh Kennedy, and Steve Johnson), comedic segments, live rock sets from Australian bands such as Birds of Tokyo, and the pub crowd singing along to "Ça Plane Pour Moi" after Billy's Joke.

Across its history, The Rush Hour has also staged numerous physical stunts and elaborate stitch-ups involving its hosts, including:

- Billy Faces the Bushrangers and JB Boxes Michael Zerafa: Physical challenges in which a padded-up Brownless faced the Victorian Bushrangers' fast-bowling attack in the practice nets, while Brayshaw sparred in the boxing ring with Australian middleweight boxer Michael Zerafa.
- Billy's Big Swim: A publicised swimming race between Brownless and former Hawthorn premiership player Campbell Brown.
- Billy's Jerilderie Statue, Wig, and Pub Urinal: Running gags and stunts in which Brownless wore a wig ("rug") in the studio, was convinced a statue of himself was being erected in his hometown of Jerilderie, and had his face placed inside a urinal at a regional Victorian hotel.

== Ratings and digital distribution ==
In official GfK Australian radio ratings surveys, The Rush Hour with JB and Billy is a major commercial pillar for Southern Cross Austereo. Following its 2025 syndication into South Australia and Western Australia, the show became the number-one Drive program (4:00–6:00 pm) in Adelaide and recorded a 20-year ratings high in Melbourne in GfK Survey 4, 2025 with a 10.7% market share—Triple M Melbourne's strongest result in the timeslot since 2006. Prior to its cancellation at the end of 2024, the Brisbane edition with Leisel Jones, Liam Flanagan, and Ben Dobbin also rated third overall in Brisbane drive with a 10.1% share.

Outside terrestrial broadcast hours, the daily catch-up podcast distributed via LiSTNR and Omny Studio—which has accumulated more than 11,000 archived audio clips and full-show catch-ups since launch—consistently ranks among Australia's most downloaded sports podcasts on the Triton Digital and Commercial Radio & Audio (CRA) Australian Podcast Ranker. At the 2021 Australian Commercial Radio Awards (ACRAs), the show's production team of Ryan Warren, Gill Goode, and Matthew Haywood was named a finalist for Best Radio Show Podcast. Video clips from the studio—particularly The Idiot File / The Vidiot File and Billy's Joke—are also distributed across Instagram, TikTok, and YouTube under the `@triplemrushhour` handle.
