= 92.7 Mix FM =

Commercial radio station in Queensland, Australia

Coordinates: 26.6578°S 153.0863°E

Old Station Logo 92.7 Mix FM - "Everything Sunshine Coast"

92.7 Mix FM (call sign: 4SSS) is an Australian commercial radio station located on Queensland's Sunshine Coast, broadcasting as Mix FM.

The station can be received in the greater Sunshine Coast area on 92.7 FM, with a Translator in the Gympie/Noosa Area on 103.3 FM. With an adult hits format, the station is targeted towards the older demographics in the listening area, leaving their sister station 91.9 Sea FM to attract the younger demographics with their contemporary hit radio format. Along with 91.9 Sea FM, 92.7 Mix FM is owned by Great Southern Land Media Group. Prior to 2013, Southern Cross Austereo owned the stations, but their sale was forced when the merger of Southern Cross Media Group with Austereo took place in 2011.

Because of an overlap between the Sunshine Coast and Brisbane radio markets, the sale resulted in a breach of Australian Communications & Media Authority (ACMA) regulations, stating a media company cannot own more than two radio assets in the same market. The breach occurred as Austereo already owned B105 and Triple M in Brisbane, which meant the company owned four stations within the overlap and a sale of two stations was forced. Southern Cross Austereo protested the decision by ACMA to force the sale of 92.7 Mix FM and 91.9 Sea FM, but the sale was eventually processed.

Despite the sale, 92.7 Mix FM retains the look and sound of a Southern Cross Austereo Triple M station, due to the previous program supply arrangements remaining in place allowing the station to continue broadcasting SCA-produced programs. In March 2013, Mix FM was purchased by Eon Broadcasters headed by Glenn Wheatley.

In 2015, Mix FM won the first ratings survey undertaken in the Sunshine Coast radio market in ten years with an overall audience share of 19.2%. The station performed best in the 40-54 demographic attracting 32.9% of audience share.

In February 2022, the station was sold to Great Southern Land Media Group, owned by some former Southern Cross Austereo executives.

Every midnight except Friday, 92.7 Mix FM airs a simulcast of The Night Shift with Luke Bona, which airs on Triple M from 12am to 5:30am AEST. Strangely, at the start of the program and during transitions from commercial breaks, It still says "Triple M"
