= Barry (radio station) =

Coordinates: 33°52′40.20″S 151°12′23.11″E

- Australia
- Frequency: DAB+
- Branding: Barry

Programming
- Format: Comedy

Ownership
- Owner: Austereo

History
- First air date: 16 July 2010
- Last air date: June 2012

Barry was a comedy digital radio station broadcasting to the five mainland state capital cities in Australia. The station is owned by Austereo and was the second permanent digital-only station the company has launched, alongside Radar Radio. The station was launched on 16 July 2010. It ceased operation in June 2012.

== Pre-launch ==
The station aired a 5-minute loop on digital radio promoting the station was coming between 4 and 16 June.

Two weeks prior to the station launch on 16 July 2010, the station ran a campaign to save the name Barry from extinction. Ads aired on all Today Network and Triple M Network FM stations pointing people to savebarry.com.au.

== Programming ==
Programming format consisted of a mix of pre-recorded and live comedy segments:

- The Peanut Gallery with Jeff Wortman & Paul Hogan (Triple M Melbourne)
- Gotcha Calls with Matt Tilley (Fox FM Melbourne)
- The Sweetest Plum (Triple M Melbourne)
- The Little Dum Dum Club with Tommy Dassalo and Karl Chandler
- Bad Blokes
- The Lunchtime Laugh
- Keith and the Girl
- Monday Night Football - (aest): Live from 6.30PM
- Stand-Up
- Song Parodies

== Formerly broadcast ==
- Paul & Rach (Triple M Sydney)
- The Heath & Normy Show (Triple M Sydney)
- Stefan & Craig (Triple M Brisbane)
- Neville from New Zealand
- Running of the Bullsh*t with Pace & Santi (Triple M Sydney)

== Availability ==
The station was heard on DAB+ radios in Sydney, Melbourne, Brisbane, Adelaide and Perth.

The station also streamed online at the Barry website and on the Barry iPad app.
