= Bianca Dye =

Australian radio presenter (born 1973)

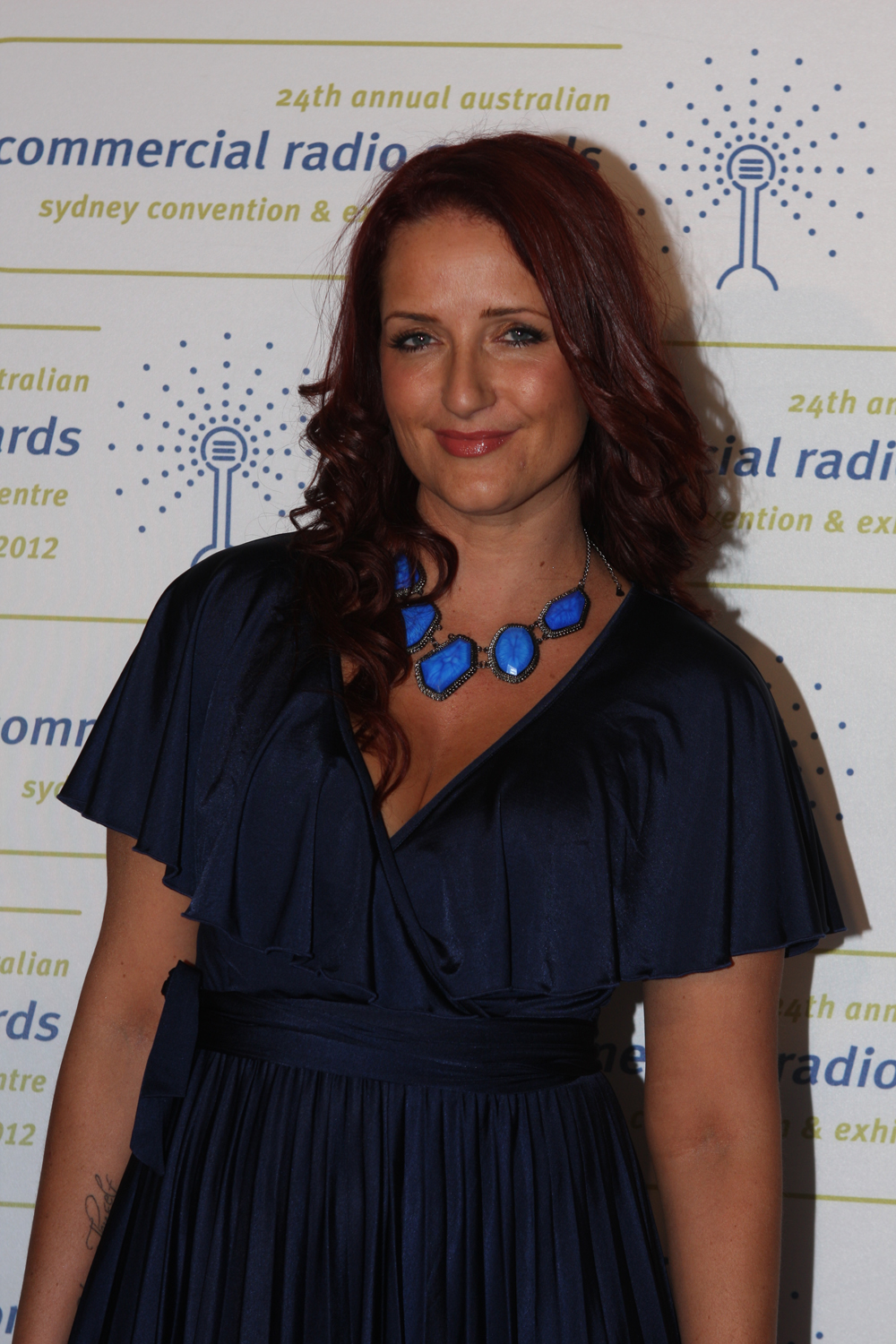
- Dye in 2012
- Born: 24 August 1973 (age 53); Melbourne, Victoria, Australia
- Years active: 1996–present
- Known for: Radio personality
- Notable work: The Nitemix Across Australia with Bianca Dye; Marty & Bianca Breakfast Show; Bianca, Terry & Bob; Bianca, Dan & Ben / Bianca, Ben & Lakey
- Television: Access All Areas; Beauty and the Beast; Daily with Susie and Bianca; Mornings with Kerri-Anne

Bianca Dye (born 24 August 1973) is an Australian radio presenter.

Throughout her career, Dye has presented programs in the competitive Sydney and Brisbane metropolitan radio markets as well as in the provincial radio markets of the Central Coast, Gold Coast and the Illawarra.

== Early life ==
Dye was born in Melbourne in 1973, the daughter of notable Australian performer Issi Dye (born Israel Dyzenhaus) and model Anne Dye. Issi Dye has enjoyed considerable success in the Australian entertainment industry as a singer and television personality.

During World War II, Dye's paternal grandmother, Edith Wrobel, was interned at the Auschwitz concentration camp. Dye's grandmother's mother and sister were murdered by the Nazis at Auschwitz but her grandmother escaped with a doctor, Benjamin Dyzenhaus, and the couple subsequently immigrated to Australia with their son Israel, who had been born in 1946. Israel Dyzenhaus changed his name by deed poll in 1969 in favour of the "showbiz name", Issi Dye.

When Dye's parents split when she was two years old, her father was awarded primary custody.

In Melbourne, Dye attended Mount Scopus Memorial College but at the age of 12, Dye relocated to Queensland with her father and step-mother where they settled on an acreage at Nerang, where Dye began attending Nerang State High School. At the age of 15, Dye ran away from home and caught the bus to Melbourne to be with her mother, after which Dye enrolled at Brighton Secondary College. She graduated from Brighton in 1991 as dux.

After travelling overseas, Dye enrolled at RMIT University but later deferred when an opportunity came up to be a ringmaster for the Moscow Circus for eight months, getting the job after a successful audition at Carrara on the Gold Coast.

== Career ==
Prior to commencing her radio career, Dye was a Marilyn Monroe impersonator at Grundy's Entertainment Centre in Surfers Paradise and a shopping centre spruiker at the Robina Town Centre.

Dye's radio career began as a promotions manager and night time announcer at a radio station on Queensland's Fraser Coast in 1996, before moving to 101.3 Sea FM in Gosford on the New South Wales Central Coast where she co-hosted the station's breakfast show.

Her profile rose when she began hosting a nationally networked evening show for RG Capital, originating from 92.5 Gold FM on the Gold Coast, called The Nitemix Across Australia with Bianca Dye in the late 1990s.

In 2001, Dye became one of the foundation presenters at new Sydney radio station Nova 96.9 and remained at the station until she left in December 2007 to travel overseas. Originally a morning announcer at Nova, Dye moved to the station's afternoon drive program with Tim Blackwell in January 2006.

Dye returned to the Gold Coast in mid-2008 for a brief period co-hosting the Hot Tomato breakfast show.

In 2009, Dye relocated to the New South Wales city of Wollongong in the Illawarra to take up a job as a breakfast presenter at i98FM. She remained at i98FM until June 2015 when she left to focus on her attempts at conceiving a child with IVF treatment.

Dye returned to the Gold Coast again in December 2015 to co-host 92.5 Gold FM's breakfast program over the Christmas/New Year period. This led to being appointed the station's afternoon drive announcer in early 2016.

In early 2017, Dye replaced popular radio host Robin Bailey on 97.3 FM's breakfast program in Brisbane, when Bailey was controversially sacked after her contract negotiations with the station failed. After three years, Bailey was lured back to the station and Dye was let go from 97.3FM in late 2019.

Dye again returned to the Gold Coast in July 2020 where she commenced co-hosting the breakfast program on Sea FM 90.9 with Ben Hannant and Dan Anstey. The show was renamed Bianca, Ben & Lakey in 2022 after Anstey left the program to join Triple M Brisbane's breakfast program and was replaced by Danny Lakey.

== Television ==
In the early 2000s, Dye hosted Access All Areas on Arena until she left the role in June 2004.

While hosting the breakfast show on Wollongong's i98 in 2010, Dye co-hosted a regional entertainment show on WIN Television called Daily with Susie and Bianca with Susie Elelman.

Throughout her career, Dye has appeared on numerous national television programs as a commentator, including Today, Nine News Now, Sunrise, The Morning Show, A Current Affair and 20 to 1.

Dye has guest hosted Studio 10 and was as a panelist on Beauty and the Beast. She has also been a contestant on Thank God You're Here, Ready Steady Cook, Celebrity Dog School, Celebrity Singing Bee and Australia's Brainiest. Dye was also an entertainment reporter for Mornings with Kerri-Anne.

== Awards ==
Year	Award	Awarded for	Station
2000	rAWARD	Best music personality (provincial)	RG Capital
2005	ACRA	Best music presenter (metro)	Nova 96.9
2006	ACRA	Best music personality (metro)	Nova 96.9
2010	ACRA	Best Community Service Project (provincial) for i98's Camp Quality Convoy for Kids (with Tia Robins, Marty Haynes & Josh Webster)	i98FM
2011	ACRA	Best Community Service Project (provincial) for The i98 Camp Quality Convoy (with Tia Robins, Marty Haynes & Josh Webster)	i98FM
2012	ACRA	Best Community Service Project (provincial) for The i98 Camp Quality Convoy with Marty & Bianca	i98FM
2022	ACRA	Best Entertainment Presenter (provincial)	90.9 Sea FM
2022	ACRA	Best Community Service Project (provincial) for Bianca, Dan & Ben's Flood Watch (with Dan Anstey & Ben Hannant)	90.9 Sea FM

== Personal life ==
Dye has regularly shared updates pertaining to problems with her fertility and her desire to become a parent, which has included undergoing IVF treatment.

In 2017, Dye alleged that, when she was aged in her early 20s, a former boyfriend physically assaulted her after she had broken up with him. Speaking about the issue of domestic violence, Dye told her on-air colleagues and listeners: "I was in a situation where I was terrified and I was crying in the kitchen with a knife in my hand because he punched me twice, he threw my Jack Russell up against the wall... he cracked a rib and he choked me".

At the age of 29, Dye was diagnosed with generalised anxiety disorder.

In 2018, Dye accused the radio industry of being rife with a sexist and sleazy culture and it was common for men to make inappropriate and unwanted advances towards female colleagues.

In 2022, she was in a relationship with former rugby league player Justin Morgan.

Dye has had an ongoing feud with Ajay Rochester. After Rochester appeared on I'm a Celebrity...Get Me Out of Here! in 2019, she accused Dye of having leaked stories about her to the media in the past, which Dye denied. Rochester also told Dye during a radio interview that she told the story of how she and Dye had fallen out "more than once" while on I'm a Celebrity...Get Me Out of Here but the footage was never aired.

=== Body positivity advocacy ===
Dye is known for her advocacy and encouragement of body positivity.

In November 2009, she posed nude for Madison magazine to promote a positive body image.

In January 2010, Dye criticised Marie Claire magazine for using model Jennifer Hawkins as an example of a natural role model when they published an untouched photo of Hawkins to raise money for the Butterfly Foundation - a charity which helps people affected by eating disorders and negative body image. Speaking on Nine's Today program, Dye said: "How is she a role model for body image if the average woman looks nothing like her? ... She's a lingerie model. How brave is it for her to take her clothes off? You don't need airbrushing love, look at you. No wonder there are so many eating disorders out there."

Marie Claire editor Jackie Frank said she was disappointed with Dye's comments, stating: "We're not saying Jennifer is what all women should aspire to. If it's making people feel worse about themselves then that's a self esteem issue. Bianca Dye's comments disappointed me. She did a fabulous thing posing nude in Madison. But it also emphasised my point. You need a major celebrity to make big news and put it on the agenda. Jennifer cut through where Bianca didn't. Instead of criticising Jennifer, she should be saying congratulations."

Speaking about the controversy, Hawkins said she didn't see herself as a "poster girl" for body image and said she didn't think a good intention to promote healthy eating and lifestyle could "snowball" as it did. Hawkins also said she was disappointed that the Butterfly Foundation had been overshadowed in the controversy, stating: "I didn't do this for PR - I did it to raise awareness for the Butterfly Foundation which helps men and women with eating disorders but you wouldn't know that because it has hardly been mentioned - and I had no idea that what was a good intention to promote healthy eating and lifestyle could snowball out of control as it has."

In 2022, Dye again posed nude, covered in gold body paint, to recreate a photo Gwyneth Paltrow had posted on Instagram to celebrate her 50th birthday. Dye decided to pose nude to boost body positivity for similarly-aged women who were disheartened after seeing Paltrow's photo, but said it wasn't to criticise or "fit shame" Paltrow's body.

=== Oocyte cryopreservation advocacy ===
As a woman who has been attempting to have children in her 40s, Dye encouraged young women who think they don't want children to consider methods such as oocyte cryopreservation to enable them to have a better chance at becoming a parent at an older age, should they change their mind.

In 2014, Dye wrote an opinion piece for The Daily Telegraph which prompted some public debate. In the article, Dye responded to comments made by performer Ricki-Lee Coulter during a radio interview, in which she stated she didn't desire to become a mother but also said: "You never know, I might turn 40 and go, ‘come on let's pop one out'."

In her article, Dye said Coulter's comments had "sent shivers down my spine". She explained that she had held a similar viewpoint to Coulter but had changed her mind and now wanted to become a parent, but was enduring a "long and hard road", going through numerous rounds of IVF treatment. Dye wrote: "My advice? Freeze your eggs now Ricki-Lee, while you can ... Technology these days is amazing and the chance of embryo survival is much better than it used to be... The sad reality of women's fertility is that your clock is ticking and “popping out” a baby at 40 isn't that easy."

Responding to the criticism, Coulter said: "My choices are my choices and my reasons for making those choices are my reasons. Nobody can question that. I don't question anybody's decisions in their lives ... I come from a big family and I’ve watched my aunties suffer through horrible things like miscarriages, IVF — fail and succeed but I’ve also seen the amazing beautiful side of having babies. It's an amazing gift that women have."

In 2018, Dye acknowledged that she "copped it" when receiving criticism for writing the article, but was satisfied that she had still managed to get her message across. She stated: "It was a forum to say if you're like Ricki-Lee and you think you don't want to have a baby, I want you to all know nothing ever goes to plan, and wouldn't it be better if you have some little eggs frozen just in case?"
