= Mount Scopus Memorial College =

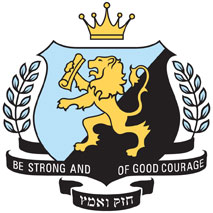

Location
- 245 Burwood Highway, Burwood, Melbourne, Victoria; Australia; 37°50′53″S 145°7′2″E

Information
- Type: Independent comprehensive co-educational early learning, primary, and secondary Jewish day school
- Motto: Hebrew: חזק ואמץ, romanized: Chazak Ve'Amatz (Be Strong and of Good Courage)
- Religious affiliation: Modern Orthodoxy
- Denomination: Judaism
- Established: 1948; 78 years ago
- Principal: Dan Sztrajt
- Years offered: ELC–12
- Gender: Co-educational
- Enrolment: 1299
- Houses: Monash (yellow), Bialik (red), Ashkanasy (green), Hillel (blue)
- Colours: Navy blue and yellow
- Affiliation: Eastern Independent Schools of Melbourne
- Website: scopus.vic.edu.au

Mount Scopus Memorial College, commonly known as Mount Scopus, or just Scopus, is an independent Modern Orthodox Jewish comprehensive co-educational early learning, primary, and secondary day school, located in the Melbourne suburb of Burwood, Victoria, Australia. Since 2023, Dan Sztrajt has been principal of Mount Scopus Memorial College.

== History ==
Mount Scopus Memorial College opened on St Kilda Road in Melbourne, Victoria, Australia in 1949, taking its name from Mount Scopus in Jerusalem, which remained under Israeli control after the 1948 Arab-Israeli War.

Mount Scopus College was the first co-educational Jewish day school in Melbourne, originally serving a student population of 143. It was established to meet the educational needs of the influx of Holocaust refugees to the Melbourne community. In 1953, the college moved to a larger campus in Burwood, which was designed by Melbourne's leading Jewish architect Anatol Kagan in association with Dr. Ernest Fooks. There are also campuses in St Kilda East and Caulfield South. Until 1996 there was a branch in Kew.

In terms of Victorian Certificate of Education results, Mount Scopus was the state's highest performing school in 2009.

== Principals ==
The principal of Mount Scopus Memorial College is Dan Sztrajt, who replaced Rabbi James Kennard. Previous principals have included Abraham Feiglin (1949–1968), Max Wahlhaus (1969), Aleksander Ranoschy (1970–1985), Rabbi Dr. Steven Lorch (1985–1991), and Rabbi William Altshul (1992–1996), Rabbi James Kennard (2007-2023).

== Sherut Leumi and ulpan ==
Mount Scopus College was the first of the Melbourne Jewish Day Schools to take part in the Sherut Leumi program. Every year, four Israeli women are sent to Mount Scopus as part of their Israeli National Service. They are a major component of Scopus' informal Jewish Studies team. Mount Scopus offers an Ulpan program in which tenth graders travel to Israel for 6–10 weeks. In 2007 and 2010, more than half of the school's tenth graders took part in this program.

== Performing arts ==
The performing arts are considered an important part of school life at Mount Scopus Memorial College.

Mount Scopus Memorial College is an IB school. Drama and Dance electives are available to students years 8–12. Theatre Studies is taught in VCE with excellent results. Music is taught from primary through to VCE, with an instrumental program available to students years 2–12.

The performing arts calendar includes an annual College Musical, Senior School Play, VCE Theatre Studies Play, Middle-school House Plays, Primary Musical (every two years), multiple Music Soirees and an 'Idol' singing competition.

Some recent productions include Bye Bye Birdie (2002), Grease (2003), Bugsy Malone (2004), The Wizard of Oz (2005), Seussical (2006), Joseph and the Technicolor Dreamcoat (2007), Disney's High School Musical (2008), The Sound of Music (2009), The Crucible (2009), Annie (2010), Disney's Beauty and the Beast (2011), Oliver! (2012), Little Shop of Horrors (2013). The 2012 production of Metamorphoses was awarded the Lyrebird Youth Awards for Best Production, Best Director – Evie Gawenda (Director of Performing Arts 2008–Current), Best Lighting and Best interpretation of script through the use of Multimedia – Evie Gawenda and Gideon Szental.

== Sport ==
Mount Scopus is a member of the Eastern Independent Schools of Melbourne (EISM).

=== EISM Premierships ===
Mount Scopus has won the following EISM senior premierships.

Combined:

- Swimming (3) – 1983, 1984, 1985

Boys:

- Badminton (4) – 2006, 2007, 2014, 2022
- Basketball – 2022
- Cricket – 1993
- Football – 2006, 2025
- Hockey (2) – 2005, 2008
- Soccer (9) – 1999, 2003, 2004, 2006, 2007, 2010, 2011, 2012, 2013
- Softball (10) – 2009, 2011, 2012, 2013, 2014, 2015, 2016, 2017, 2020, 2021
- Table Tennis (9) – 1999, 2001, 2002, 2003, 2004, 2007, 2013, 2014, 2019
- Tennis (7) – 1990, 2002, 2015, 2016, 2019, 2020, 2022
- Volleyball – 2022

Girls:

- Athletics – 1971
- Basketball (2) – 1979, 1980
- Bowling – 2004
- Cricket – 2008
- Hockey (6) – 1983, 1998, 2002, 2003, 2004, 2007
- Soccer (5) – 2014, 2015, 2016, 2017, 2022
- Softball (7) – 1983, 2000, 2001, 2002, 2014, 2017, 2018
- Swimming (9) – 1972, 1973, 1974, 1977, 1978, 1979, 1980, 1981, 1982
- Table Tennis (3) – 2003, 2021, 2022
- Tennis (5) – 2004, 2005, 2020, 2021, 2022
- Volleyball (2) – 1980, 1981

Mount Scopus have won the following Year 9 EISM Premierships

Year 9 Boys:

- Football – 2014, 2019
- Indoor Soccer – 2012, 2014, 2016, 2017, 2018, 2019, 2022
- Soccer – 2011, 2013, 2017, 2019
- Softball – 2011, 2018
- Table Tennis – 2010, 2017
- Tennis – 2011, 2013, 2017
- Touch Rugby – 2013
- Ultimate Frisbee – 2017, 2022
- Volleyball – 2017, 2018

Year 9 Girls:

- Hockey – 2014, 2017
- Softball – 2012, 2014, 2015, 2017
- Table Tennis – 2015, 2019
- Tennis – 2019
- Touch Rugby – 2012, 2013
- Volleyball – 2014

== Notable alumni ==
- Louise Adler – publisher
- Neal Ashkanasy – emotional intelligence researcher
- Josh Burns – Member for Macnamara in the Australian House of Representatives
- Michael Danby MP – Federal politician, Member for Melbourne Ports
- Bianca Dye – radio presenter
- Issi Dye – entertainer
- Geoffrey Edelsten – entrepreneur
- Josh Frydenberg MP – former Treasurer of Australia and member for Kooyong in the Australian House of Representatives
- Joe Gersh – businessman
- Deborah Glass – Victorian Ombudsman
- Michael Gudinski – music industry and entertainment entrepreneur
- Michelle Haber – cancer researcher, also attended Moriah College
- Janet Hiller – epidemiologist
- Dena Kaplan – actress
- Naomi Milgrom – businesswoman
- Shira Nayman – writer
- Eva Orner – filmmaker and Academy Award winner
- Mark Regev – former spokesman for the Israeli Prime Minister and former ambassador of Israel to the United Kingdom
- Kim Rubenstein – academic
- Carol Schwartz – businesswoman
- Harry Sheezel – AFL player at North Melbourne Football Club
- David Southwick – Member of the Legislative Assembly in Victoria
- Leon Zwier – Lawyer

== Notable staff ==
- Eva Duldig, Austrian-born Australian and Dutch tennis player and author
- James Kennard, educationalist and former principal of the school
- Jason Shulman, aka hip hop artist Reason

== See also ==
- List of non-government schools in Victoria
- Judaism in Australia
