= Issi Dye =

Australian entertainer (born 1946)

- Born: Israel Dyzenhaus; 12 June 1946 (age 80); Austria
- Occupation: performer
- Years active: 1969–present
- Known for: releasing pop music in 1960's and 1970's; performing on television variety programs; hosting a midnight to dawn block of films on television
- Notable work: "Incense", "One Last Kiss", "Personality"
- Television: In Gear with Issi Dye, Issi Dye Presents Late Movies
- Children: 3 (including Bianca Dye)

Issi Dye (born 12 June 1946) also known as Issi Dy and Issi Di, is an Australian entertainer.

== Early life ==
Dye was born Israel Dyzenhous in Austria to Dr Ben Dyzenhaus and Edith Dyzenhaus (née Wrobel).

Dye's mother Edith had been interned in the Auschwitz concentration camp, where her mother and aunt were murdered by the Nazis. She met Dr Ben Dyzenhaus after he was sent to Austria from Poland to help rescue survivors of The Holocaust. The couple later migrated to Australia with their three-year-old son Israel Dyzenhaus.

After the family settled in Melbourne, Dye attended Mount Scopus Memorial College and sang in the choir with his father at the Toorak synagogue.

== Career ==
Changing his name by deed poll in 1969 to the "showbiz name" of Issi Dye, he had moderate success as a pop singer. His most successful hit was a song called "Incense", released in 1969. Other minor hits included "One Last Kiss", "Personality", "I Wonder Where You Are" and "I'm Counting On You".

In 1970, Dye was ranked at #6 on the Go-Set pop poll.

Throughout the 1970s, Dye regularly appeared on television programs including Bandstand, The Go!! Show, Kommotion, The Ernie Sigley Show, The Penthouse Club, The Maumill Show, Celebrity Squares and Happening '72. Dye performed on the final episode of Happening '72, footage of which was discovered in 2022 and was subsequently restored and preserved by the National Film and Sound Archive. Dye also performed on a television special in 1975 to celebrate the third anniversary of TattsLotto.

Dye went on to host his own television programs including In Gear with Issi Dye, a fashion show on ABC TV and Issi Dye Presents Late Movies, an overnight block of films on the Nine Network.

While hosting Issi Dye Presents Late Movies from the mid 1970's to the early 1980's, Dye garnered a cult following and became well known for his work on late night television. In what were essentially wraparound segments, Dye would introduce films but would also host live commercials with the owners of the advertising businesses coming into the studio to accompany Dye while he hosted the advertisements. When the comedy cabaret act North 2 Alaskans released a single, 'Gonks go Beat', in 1982 it featured a cover of Dye's first single, 'Incense', which quoted his advertising catchphrase 'Call Rita or myself'. Another oft repeated phrase It's just a little after midnight... was ranked in a "Top Ten Lines from Australian TV" list, compiled by the Coodabeen Champions in 1987.

In the late 1980's, he relocated to the Gold Coast and began appearing on NRTV where he continued introducing late night movies on Friday nights as well as hosting a lotto draw. It was there that Dye helped organise a "vibe in" benefit for Steve Gilpin, the former lead singer of Mi-Sex who suffered serious injuries in a car accident near Mullumbimby, but later died.

Dye began starring in an Al Jolson tribute show in the late 1990's, touring nationally.

After living on the Gold Coast for 15 years, Dye moved back to Melbourne in 2001. That same year, he continued touring with his shows Crooners and the Rat Pack and Best of Al Jolson.

== Personal life ==
Dye is the father of three children, including radio presenter Bianca Dye, with whom he performed a show in 2007 called The Singing Yid and His Famous Kid.
