= Janet Hiller =

Australian academic

- Born: Janet Esther Hiller; 23 February 1953 (age 73); Melbourne, Australia
- Education: Johns Hopkins University; Hebrew University of Jerusalem; University of Melbourne

Janet Hiller (born 23 February 1953) is an Australian epidemiologist and health services researcher. She is currently the Dean of the School of Health Sciences in the Faculty of Health, Arts and Design at the Swinburne University of Technology.

== Education ==
Educated at Mount Scopus Memorial College, Hiller qualified as a social worker in 1975 from the University of Melbourne before working at West Heidelberg Community Health Centre for two years.

After completing a Master of Public Health in 1981 at the Hebrew University of Jerusalem, she enrolled in a PhD in epidemiology at the Johns Hopkins University School of Hygiene and Public Health, from which she graduated in 1987.

== Career ==
Hiller returned to Australia in 1987 following a 10-year absence in order to join the faculty of the University of Adelaide, where she was appointed as lecturer in the Department of Community Medicine. She remained at the University of Adelaide until 2011. During the 23 years at the University she was promoted to Professor and assumed a number of administrative roles including Convenor of the Masters of Public Health program, Head of the Department of Public Health, Acting and Deputy Head of the School of Population Health as well as teaching epidemiology, public health and health services research to undergraduate public health and medicine students and post graduate public health students. Hiller was the founding director of Adelaide Health Technology Assessment.

== Selected publications ==
- Mnatzaganian, G.; Ryan, P.; Hiller, J.E. (2014). "Does Co-morbidity provide significant improvement on age adjustment when predicting medical outcomes?". Methods Inf Med. 53 (2): 115–120. doi:10.3414/ME13-01-0095. PMID 24514895.
- Pande, S.; Hiller, J.E.; Nkansah, N.; Bero, L. (2013). "The effect of pharmacist-provided non-dispensing services on patient outcomes, health service utilisation and costs in low- and middle-income countries". Cochrane Database Syst Rev. 2013 (2) CD010398. doi:10.1002/14651858.CD010398. PMC 9829534. PMID 23450614.
- Buckley, E.S.; Webster, F.; Hiller, J.E.; Roder, D.M.; Farshid, G. (2014). "A systematic review of surgical biopsy of LCIS found at core needle biopsy - do we have the answer yet?". Eur J Surg Oncol. 40 (2): 168–176. doi:10.1016/j.ejso.2013.10.024. PMID 24246610.
- Mitchell, B.G.; Gardner, A.; Barnett, A.G.; Hiller, J.E.; Graves, N. (2014). "The prolongation of length of stay because of Clostridium difficile infection". Am J Infect Control. 42 (2): 164–167. doi:10.1016/j.ajic.2013.07.006. PMID 24290226.
