= Ben Dobbin =

Australian sports journalist and commentator

- Born: 1966; Sydney, New South Wales, Australia
- Other name: Dobbo
- Occupations: radio host and sports journalist
- Years active: 2011-present
- Known for: Hosting radio programs on Triple M Brisbane and the Resonate Network
- Television: Nine News Queensland, The Footy Show

Benjamin McIntosh "Dobbo" Dobbin (born 1976) is an Australian radio presenter, sports journalist and rugby league commentator.

Arguably best known for his association with sports journalism, he is currently a television sports reporter for Nine News and a rugby league commentator for the Triple M radio network.

Dobbin also hosts a morning rural affairs program called Rural Queensland Today which airs on the Resonate network in regional Queensland.

== Media career ==
Dobbin first came to notice following an appearance during a televised fundraising appeal on Channel 9 for victims of the 2010–2011 Queensland floods. During a live cross to Ben Fordham in Condamine, Fordham invited his best friend Dobbin to appear on screen.

Dobbin's appearance was well received by viewers and network executives who subsequently offered him a position as The Footy Show's Queensland correspondent, despite originally being from New South Wales.

This led to Southern Cross Austereo executive Rex Morris offering Dobbin an unpaid spot on Triple M Brisbane's Dead Set Legends program hosted by Ben Ikin and Kevin Walters. Morris, who owned the Resonate Broadcasting network in regional Queensland, subsequently offered Dobbin a job in 2016 as host of Rural Queensland Today, a morning rural affairs program heard on stations in Charleville, Charters Towers, Dalby, Emerald, Kingaroy, Longreach, Mount Isa and Roma.

In 2017, Dobbin was announced as a co-host of Triple M's new local South East Queensland drive program The Luke Bradnam Show with Libby Trickett and Dobbo, alongside Luke Bradnam and Libby Trickett. He then commenced as co-host of the local edition of The Rush Hour in 2022 alongside Leisel Jones and Liam Flanagan.

From 2019, Dobbin has contributed breaking sports news to The Big Breakfast program on Triple M in Brisbane and has hosted his own Saturday morning program, Dead Set Dobbo. In 2022, Dobbin joined the station's Sunday Sin Bin program, replacing Anthony Maroon.

Dobbin is part of Triple M's NRL coverage during which he provides sideline updates during NRL games.

On 14 March 2024, following South Sydney Rabbitohs' Round 2 defeat against the Brisbane Broncos at Lang Park, Dobbin interviewed South Sydney player Latrell Mitchell live on Triple M. Dobbin's interview attracted considerable attention when Mitchell swore multiple times throughout the brief interview. This led to a number of rugby league commentators and former players, including Phil Gould, Paul Kent, Anthony Maroon, Ryan Girdler and Ben Te'o criticising Mitchell for his behaviour with some accusing the NRL of failing to adequately reprimand Mitchell for such conduct, suggesting the NRL's reluctance to sanction him was indicative of special treatment - a claim NRL CEO Andrew Abdo denies. However, Candice Warner criticised Dobbin for not cautioning Mitchell about his language during the interview.

However, the incident also saw complaints lodged by the South Sydney Rabbitohs and Nine Entertainment who took issue with the fact Dobbin's sideline interview was filmed and shared on Triple M's social media channels. The NRL subsequently advised their radio partners that they only have audio-only rights and are not permitted to film games or interviews, despite Triple M having done so for 18 months without issue.

Dobbin is also a television sports reporter and commentator. He is currently a sports reporter for Nine News Queensland and has been part of the commentary team for the network's Queensland Cup rugby league coverage.

As a rugby league commentator, Dobbin's critique of the game and its players have occasionally attracted attention.

== Personal life ==
Dobbin attended Riverview boarding school in Sydney where one of his schoolfriends was Ben Fordham. Fordham is godfather to Dobbin's children.

At the age of 19, Dobbin secured employment as a jackaroo on Brunette Downs Station in the Northern Territory. While working on Brunette Downs, Dobbin was inspired to pursue a career as an auctioneer after seeing an auctioneer working at the Brunette Downs Races. This led to him commencing employment as an auctioneer with Primac Elders in Springsure, Queensland in 1999. In 2001, Dobbin won "Young Auctioneer of the Year" at the Ekka in Brisbane. He worked as an auctioneer until 2012 which saw him working in Moura and Meandarra. In 2010, he started a meat wholesale business with the Hughes family called Rangeland Quality Meats.

Dobbin has been married twice. He attributes the challenge of owning and managing a cattle property during a severe drought as to why his first marriage broke down.

Dobbin married his second wife in November 2021. While honeymooning on Hamilton Island, the manager of Qualia Resort confronted him about an unauthorised photo his wife had taken of Amal Clooney, who was visiting the island while her husband George Clooney was filming Ticket to Paradise. After his wife sent the photo to Dobbin, he passed it on to a colleague at Channel 9 where it was subsequently used on Nine News. Dobbin said the confrontation prompted him and his wife to leave the island early, shortening their honeymoon by two days. In a statement, a Hamilton Island spokesperson said that although Dobbin was given a warning about unauthorised photography, he was not asked to leave the island and was deeply apologetic.

In early 2022, Dobbin underwent heart surgery at St Andrew's Hospital in Brisbane where he had a stent inserted after the discovery of a major blockage.

Dobbin is part of the ownership group which established the Western Power franchise representing Ipswich in the Brisbane Premier League T20 competition.
