= 91.9 Sea FM =

- Maroochydore, Queensland; Australia
- Broadcast area: Nambour RA1 ()
- Frequency: 91.9 MHz FM
- Branding: 91.9 Sea FM

Programming
- Language: English
- Format: Top 40 (CHR)

Ownership
- Owner: Great Southern Land Media Group; (Sunshine Coast Broadcasters Pty Ltd)

History
- First air date: 21 June 1996
- Call sign meaning: 4 – Queensland; SEE (sounds like SEA)

Technical information
- Power: 10 kW
- HAAT: 331 m
- Transmitter coordinates: 26°47′24″S 152°55′5″E
- Repeater: 102.5FM Tewantin

Links
- Website: 919seafm.com.au

91.9 Sea FM (call sign: 4SEE) is a commercial radio station licensed to, and serving the Sunshine Coast and surrounding areas. It broadcasts on 91.9 MHz on the FM band from its studios in Maroochydore with a Translator to the Gympie/Noosa region on 102.5 MHz. It is owned by Great Southern Land Media Group, and is sister station to 92.7 Mix FM.

== History ==
In 1995, Sea FM Pty Ltd – later the RG Capital Radio Network – purchased the license of studios of 92.7 Mix FM. The group was successful in launching a second station in the growing Sunshine Coast region. Modelled on its Gold Coast sister station, 91.9 Sea FM was launched on 26 June 1996. In 1998, the two stations moved to purpose-built studios and offices in Maroochydore.

The station was sold to Macquarie Regional RadioWorks in 2004, later Southern Cross Media. Following the merger with Austereo, in 2013 the Australian Communications & Media Authority deemed that Southern Cross Austereo's ownership of stations in both the Brisbane and Sunshine Coast markets breached media diversity laws. The stations were sold to EON Broadcasting headed by Glenn Wheatley in March 2013, with the station retaining a program supply agreement with Southern Cross Austereo.

In February 2022, the station was sold to Great Southern Land Media Group, owned by some former Southern Cross Austereo executives.
