= Bob Blewett (cricketer) =

Australian cricketer (born 1943)

Personal information
- Full name: Robert Kevin Blewett
- Born: 30 March 1943 (age 83); Prospect, Adelaide, South Australia
- Batting: Right-handed
- Bowling: Slow left-arm orthodox
- Relatives: Greg Blewett (son)

Domestic team information
- Years: Team
- 1975/76–1978/79: South Australia

Career statistics
Competition	First-class	List A
Matches	25	3
Runs scored	1,070	26
Batting average	24.88	8.66
100s/50s	2/4	0/0
Top score	112	15
Balls bowled	3,048	120
Wickets	30	0
Bowling average	40.23	–
5 wickets in innings	0	–
10 wickets in match	0	–
Best bowling	4/88	–
Catches/stumpings	24/–	3/–
- Source: Cricinfo, 1 May 2018

Robert Kevin Blewett (born 30 March 1943) is an Australian former cricketer. He played 25 first-class and three List A matches for South Australia between 1975 and 1979. He is the father of Australian former Test cricketer Greg Blewett.
