= Triple M Central Coast =

Coordinates: 33.4333°S 151.3466°E

- Gosford, New South Wales, Australia; Australia
- Broadcast area: Central Coast; Newcastle; Port Stephens
- Frequencies: 1310 kHz AM (1971–1978); 1323 kHz AM (1978–1986); 801 kHz AM (1986–1992); 107.7 MHz FM (1992–present)

Programming
- Format: Mainstream rock Adult contemporary
- Affiliations: Triple M

Ownership
- Owner: Southern Cross Austereo

History
- First air date: 19 November 1971 (as 2GO)
- Former call signs: 2GO (1971–1991)
- Call sign meaning: 2 – New South Wales; G GOsford (derived from former 2GO callsign)

Links
- Website: www.triplem.com.au/centralcoast

Triple M Central Coast (call-sign: 2GGO) is a commercial radio station based in Gosford, New South Wales, Australia. The broadcast area is the NSW Central Coast, a region that extends from southern Lake Macquarie to the Hawkesbury River. Originally called 2GO, it was the Central Coast's first radio station starting on the AM band with 1310, moving to 1323, and the final location on the AM band was 801 (to allow for stereo broadcasting). It later moved to its current frequency of FM 107.7.

Ownership of the station has changed a number of times. For some period it was a part of Wesgo, being a two-station company comprising 2GO in Gosford and 2WS in Sydney.

In June 1995 it was sold to Sunshine Broadcasting that already owned Central Coast station Coast Rock FM. Currently owned by Southern Cross Austereo, in November 2019 it was rebranded to Triple M.

The original AM transmitter tower complex for 2GO in 1971 was at Ourimbah before moving to Chittaway Point in 1985. In 1992 the station converted to FM (107.7 MHz) with transmitters at Somersby.

Former 2GO logo at 801 AM
