= Louis Sass =

American psychologist

Louis A. Sass is a professor of Clinical Psychology at the Graduate School of Applied and Professional Psychology at Rutgers University who specializes in severe psychopathology, philosophy and psychology, and psychology and the arts. Sass has served on the faculty of Rutgers University since 1983 and has been a visiting professor at a wide range of institutions both in the United States and abroad. He has been published widely, and his book Madness and Modernism: Insanity in the Light of Modern Art, Literature, and Thought has been called "a new landmark in the study of the modern era.". The revised edition of Madness and Modernism (Oxford University Press, 2018) won the BMA: British Medical Association's 2018 award for Best Book in Psychiatry.

== Life ==
Sass obtained his B.A. at Harvard University in 1970 and his Ph.D. at the University of California, Berkeley, in 1979. He completed his clinical internship in psychiatry at Cornell University Medical Center-New York Hospital, Westchester Division, in 1982. After serving as an assistant professor at the faculty College of the Holy Cross in Worcester, Massachusetts, he joined the faculty of Rutgers University. He has been a visiting professor at Leiden University in the Netherlands, the University of Chicago, the University of Michoacan of San Nicolás de Hidalgo in Morelia, Mexico, the Center for Subjectivity Research at the University of Copenhagen, the University of Oviedo in Spain, the Institute for the History and Philosophy of Science and Technology in Paris, universities in Bogota, Colombia, and the University of Durham in England. He has collaborated on research and writing projects with collaborators in Denmark, Spain, England, Mexico, Australia, Italy and the United States and has been a featured lecturer in these countries and elsewhere. He has also featured in a number of films on the subject of Schizophrenia.

From 1998 to 1999, Sass was president of the Division of Psychology and the Arts of the American Psychological Association, and from 2006 to 2007 he was president of their Division of Theoretical and Philosophical Psychology. In 2010, he was awarded the Joseph B. Gittler Award from the American Psychological Association "in recognition of his longstanding commitment to using philosophy to advance psychology research and scholarship". In 2020, he was awarded the Sarton Medal by the University of Ghent in Belgium. He has also twice served as a Forum Fellow and speaker at the World Economic Forum in Davos, Switzerland.

Sass is both a full member of the graduate faculty of psychology and an affiliate of the comparative literature program. His interests include "the intersection of clinical psychology with philosophy, the arts, and literary studies." He is a Fellow of the New York Institute for the Humanities.

== Personal life ==
Sass lives in New Jersey with his wife, Shira Nayman, a writer and clinical psychologist. The couple have a son and a daughter together.

== Books ==
- Hermeneutics and Psychological Theory: Interpretive Approaches to Personality, Psychopathology and Psychotherapy. ed. with S. Messer & R. Woolfolk. New Brunswick, NJ: Rutgers University Press. 1988.
- Madness and Modernism: Insanity in the Light of Modern Art, Literature, and Thought. Harvard University Press. 1994. ISBN 978-0674541375.
- The Paradoxes of Delusion: Wittgenstein, Schreber, and the Schizophrenic Mind. Ithaca, New York, and London: Cornell University Press. 1995. ISBN 978-0801498992.

== Awards and grants ==
- 1982: National Endowment for the Humanities
- 1982: Princeton Institute for Advanced Study
- 2004: Fulbright Garcia Robles Award to Mexico (combined senior lecturer & researcher award)
- 2010: Joseph B. Gittler award from the American Psychological Foundation (American Psychological Association)
- 2013-2015: Honorary Professor, Department of Philosophy, Durham University, UK
- 2018: BMA: British Medical Association Best Book in Psychiatry (for Madness and Modernism)
- 2019/2020: Sarton Medal, University of Ghent, Belgium. This is an international prize to honor one person annually for his/her contributions to psychology/educational sciences.
- 2020: Award for Distinguished Theoretical and Philosophical Contributions to Psychology, from American Psychological Association, Division 24
