= Shira Nayman =

American novelist

- Born: Johannesburg, South Africa
- Citizenship: South Africa; Australia; United States
- Education: Monash University (BS); Rutgers University; Weill Cornell Medicine; Columbia University
- Occupations: Novelist; short story writer; clinical psychologist
- Spouse: Louis Sass
- Website: shiranayman.com

Shira Nayman is a South African, Australian, and American novelist, short story writer and clinical psychologist. She is best known for her collection Awake in the Dark, published in 2006.

== Early life and education ==
Shira Nayman was born in Johannesburg in South Africa to Jacob "Jack" Nayman and Doreen Shapiro, who were both children of refugees from Lithuania and Latvia.

The family emigrated to Australia, with Shira attending Mount Scopus Memorial College in Melbourne. Her father, Jack, was originally from Benoni and graduated with a degree in medicine from the University of the Witwatersrand in Johannesburg. He joined the Department of Surgery at the University of Melbourne. His wife, Doreen, was a music teacher and broadcaster. She specialised in the Kodály method and was a long-time radio presenter on 3MBS, where she presented the Women in Music series. Doreen was a cousin of Colin Tatz, who also emigrated to Australia from South Africa at the same time. Shira’s sister, Michele, is also a writer.

In Melbourne, Shira was raised in a community of mostly Holocaust survivors. She has said that this, along with her own family's escape from Eastern Europe during the pogroms of the early 20th century, has inspired her fiction.

Nayman graduated from Melbourne's Monash University, with a Bachelor of Science in physiology and psychology. She moved to the United States, where she received her doctorate in clinical psychology from Rutgers University. After completing a two-year post-doctoral fellowship in psychology at New York Hospital-Cornell University Medical Center, Nayman earned her master's degree in English and Comparative Literature at Columbia University in New York, in 1990.

== Writing ==
=== Awake in the Dark ===
Nayman's first book, a collection featuring a novella and short stories, was published by Scribner in 2006. Like most of her work, Awake in the Dark takes the Second World War as its subject matter, portraying the lives of children of Holocaust victims and perpetrators as they struggle with their parents' legacy. Newsday named it one of the best books of 2006, writing, "The bleak, beautiful and deftly plotted stories [...] are like nothing out there, taking as their theme the collateral damage of Nazism, delivered in many cases with an O. Henry twist.” Karen R. Long gave the book a glowing review in the Cleveland Plain Dealer, writing that, in these stories, the Holocaust "is the smoldering demon that reaches across generations, scraping its talons into the interior lives of children and grandchildren who were, metaphorically and literally, left in the dark." It was also named a notable book of the year by the San Francisco Chronicle.

=== The Listener ===
Nayman followed up the success of Awake in the Dark with a debut novel, The Listener, which was published by Scribner in 2009. A psychological drama that takes place in a mental asylum in upstate New York in the aftermath of World War II, The Listener expanded on many of the themes she had investigated in her previous work by exploring the havoc historical trauma plays with the psyche and illuminating the uncertain boundary between sanity and insanity. It was praised as "an honest look at the way trauma and violence afflict an entire generation's psyche," and elsewhere described as a "gripping narrative with style and depth." It was listed as an Editors Choice in The New York Times.

=== A Mind of Winter ===
Her second novel, A Mind of Winter, was published by Akashic Books in 2012. This time coming at the Second World War by way of Shanghai, London, and Long Island, A Mind of Winter is a psychological thriller that once again asks how war can shape identity and experience. Named one of Library Journal's "Best 2012 Indie Novels," A Mind of Winter was well received by critics, praised for having "the beauty and elegance of a Victorian novel," and for "tak[ing] the reader on a journey into the abyss of human experience."

=== River ===
River, a crossover adult/young adult novel, was published in April 2020 by Guernica Editions.

=== Shoreline ===
Shoreline (2024) is a nontraditional, creative memoir taking up the theme of intergenerational wandering and dislocation.

=== Other publications ===
Nayman has also published fiction and nonfiction in publications such as The Atlantic, Cousin Corinne's, The Georgia Review, The New England Review, and Psychoanalysis and Contemporary Thought. A short story commissioned by NPR, "Moon Landing," was broadcast in December 2010, and was chosen as one of eight stories to appear in the "Best of Hanukkah Lights" broadcast. Two chapter excerpts from Nayman's new book, Shoreline, were published in Tablet Magazine (November, 2020, and June, 2021). Another excerpt, Moon Landing, was published in Tikkun Magazine in 2021.

== Teaching and consulting ==
Nayman has taught psychology at Rutgers University, literature at Columbia University, and fiction writing at Barnard College. She has also taught in the Program of Narrative Medicine at Columbia University.

In addition to her writing and teaching career, Nayman is a marketing consultant who has developed positioning strategy for major brands and product launches for such Fortune 100 companies as Microsoft, Hershey, AOL, and political campaigns, including the Center for National Policy and Hillary Clinton's United States Senate campaign.

After 23 years with Strategic Frameworking, Inc., Nayman founded her own company, Shira Nayman Consulting, in 2012. She specializes in in-depth psychological research as well as children's and women's issues.

== Personal life ==
She lives in Brooklyn, New York, and Highland Park, New Jersey, with her husband, the psychologist and writer, Louis Sass. They have a son and a daughter together. She became a US citizen having lived there for 27 years. She was born a citizen of South Africa, before becoming an Australian citizen.

== Recognition and awards ==
Nayman has received three-year-long grants for fiction writing from the Australia Council for the Arts Literature Board. She is also the recipient of the Cape Branch Award for an Emerging Woman Writer (2011), and a fiction-writing grant from the Hadassah-Brandeis Institute (2011).

Nayman was a 2019 MacDowell Fellow.
