= Triple M =

Australian commercial radio network

- Country: Australia
- Broadcast area: Australia
- Headquarters: South Melbourne, Victoria

Programming
- Language: English
- Format: Mainstream rock; (major cities); Modern adult contemporary/Adult hits (regional)

Ownership
- Owner: Seven Media Group

History
- Launch date: 1980; 46 years ago

Links
- Website: triplem.com.au

Triple M is an Australian commercial radio network owned and operated by Seven Media Group. The network consists of 45 radio stations with flagship stations broadcasting a mainstream/classic rock music format in Sydney, Melbourne and Brisbane, 37 regional stations broadcasting a modern adult contemporary/adult hits format and five digital radio stations.

The network dates back to the launch of Triple M Sydney in 1980. On 15 December 2016, the network was amalgamated with the LocalWorks network of regional radio stations.

== History ==
The first Triple M station was Triple M Sydney, which commenced broadcasting in Sydney on 2 August 1980. Triple M Sydney and 2Day FM were the first commercial FM radio stations in Sydney. Throughout the 1980s, Triple M was one of the highest-rating radio stations in Sydney, spearheaded by its morning show presented by Doug Mulray and featuring the writing of and occasional appearances by Andrew Denton. For all of this period and into the 1990s, Triple M's promotional campaign featured the character "Dr Dan", a guitar-playing satyr with wings, inspired by artwork by legendary Australian cartoonist Peter Ledger, and a theme song that was an extended reworking of the Mike Batt track "Introduction (The Journey of a Fool)", from his 1979 album Tarot Suite.

In November 1986, Melbourne radio station EON FM was purchased by Triple M. EON FM was Australia's first commercial FM radio station, commencing broadcasting on 11 July 1980.

Brisbane radio station Triple M Brisbane was launched in 1980 and took on the FM104 identity soon after. It returned to the Triple M identity in early 1990.. Triple M Brisbane started broadcasting on 104.1FM, then late in the 1980s changed to its present frequency of 104.5-FM.

Adelaide radio station 5KA converted from 1197 kHz to 104.7 MHz on 1 January 1990 and was renamed KAFM (5KKA). The station was taken over by Village Roadshow, who then owned Triple M, and they successfully negotiated the purchase of the 5MMM callsign from a community radio station in 1993. That station is now known as Three D Radio, and the 5MMM callsign is now used by Triple M Adelaide (104.7).

Perth radio station 96FM also carried the Triple M identity in the early 1990s but was then sold to Southern Cross Broadcasting who changed the station's identity back to its original name. Mix 94.5 until December 2020 was considered to be a part of the Triple M network in Perth utilising local programming (as opposed to airing networked Triple M programmes) and Mix 94.5 didn’t carry the Triple M brand, logo or call letters.

In Auckland, New Zealand, a Triple M station existed between 1984 and 1988 when 89 Stereo FM became part of Triple M. The station previously used the call sign 1ROQ and changed to 1MMM when becoming part of Triple M. New Zealand no longer uses radio station call signs. This station later reverted to 89FM in 1988 and eventually closed down in 1994.

While many of the comedy and talk programs are networked, large sections of music programming originate from the local market of each Triple M.

On Friday 17 November 2006, Triple M (including Mix 94.5 in Perth) referred to itself as U2FM for the day, as part of a promotion relating to the band U2 and their 2006 Australian Tour and CD release.

Triple M launched High Voltage Radio, a pop up digital radio station that exclusively played AC/DC for the duration of the band's 2010 tour of Australia.

On 16 August 2013, Triple M Perth was launched on digital radio, returning the station to Perth. Branded as Perth's Real Music Alternative, the station also carried Triple M AFL coverage. On 27 September 2014, the station was replaced by Triple M Modern Rock Digital. Featuring only new rock music, the station also expanded to Adelaide.

On 25 November 2013, Triple M Classic Rock Digital radio station was launched. The station format is exclusively classic rock, with no announcer talkback.

On 1 December 2020, the Triple M brand was relaunched in Perth, replacing contemporary hit radio station Hit 92.9 after sister station Mix 94.5 switched affiliation to the Hit Network.

== Stations ==
As of 1 December 2020, the Triple M network consists of 40 AM and FM radio stations.

- Triple M 104.7 Adelaide
- Triple M 783 Albany
- Triple M 864 Avon Valley
- Triple M 93.5 Bendigo
- Triple M 105.7 The Border
- Triple M 102.9 Broome
- Triple M 104.5 Brisbane
- Triple M 93.1 Bundaberg
- Triple M 99.5 Cairns
- Mix 106.3 Canberra
- Triple M Cape to Cape 756
- Triple M 666 Carnarvon
- Triple M 107.7 Central Coast
- Triple M 101.5 Central Queensland
- Triple M 105.1 Central West
- Triple M 1098 Central Wheatbelt
- Triple M 106.3 Coffs Coast
- Triple M 864 Darling Downs
- Triple M 93.5 Dubbo
- Triple M 747 Esperance
- Triple M 103.5 Fraser Coast
- Triple M 98.1 Geraldton
- Triple M 97.9 Gippsland
- Triple M 92.5 Gold Coast
- Triple M 981 Goldfields
- Triple M 95.3 Goulburn Valley
- Triple M 1071 Great Southern
- Triple M 107.3 Hobart
- Triple M 102.5 Karratha
- Triple M 90.5 Limestone Coast
- Triple M Mackay98.7 & 92.3The Whitsundays
- Triple M 105.1 Melbourne
- Triple M 106.7 Mid North Coast
- Triple M 102.9 Newcastle
- Triple M 92.9 Perth
- Triple M 94.1 Port Hedland
- Triple M 1152 Riverina
- Triple M 963 Riverina MIA
- Triple M 963 Southwest
- Triple M 97.9 Sunraysia
- Triple M 104.9 Sydney
- Triple M 102.3 Townsville
- Triple M 94.3 Warragul
- Triple M Remote WA

=== Digital radio ===
As of 20 July 2020, the Triple M network broadcasts an additional six radio stations on DAB+ digital radio.

Years	Triple M station	Format	Availability	History
2013–2016, 2017–present	Triple M Classic Rock	Classic rock	Sydney, Melbourne, Brisbane, Adelaide, Perth and Hobart	
2021–present	Triple M 80s	1980s music	Sydney, Melbourne, Brisbane and Adelaide	Formerly known as: – Triple M Soft Rock (2019–2021) – Triple M Aussie (2019) – Triple M Modern Digital (2017–2019) – Triple M Modern Rock (2014–2016) – Triple M Perth (2013–2014)
2023–present	Triple M Tradie Radio	1990s music, 2000s music	Sydney, Melbourne, Brisbane, Adelaide, Perth and Hobart	Formerly known as: – Triple M 90s (2020–2023) – Triple M Greatest Hits (2017–2020) – OMG! (2016–2017)
2022–present	Triple M 2000s	2000s music	Sydney, Melbourne, Brisbane and Adelaide	Formerly known as: – Triple M Hard n Heavy (2019–2022) Hard N Heavy was moved to the LiSNTR internet radio platform.
2018–present	Triple M Country	Country music	Sydney, Melbourne, Brisbane, Adelaide, Perth and Hobart	Formerly known as: – The Range (2012–2018)
2023–present	Triple M Almost Acoustic	Acoustic music	Sydney, Melbourne, Brisbane	

Southern Cross Austereo also owns Mix 106.3 Canberra along with the Australian Radio Network, and is part of the Triple M network, although it is operated primarily by ARN as part of its KIIS Network.

== Music ==
=== M-One Rock festival ===
In September 2002, Triple M and Frontier Touring held four rock concerts in Brisbane, Adelaide, Melbourne and Sydney as part of the touring M-One festival, which featured Goo Goo Dolls, Nickelback, Garbage, Lifehouse, Default, Midnight Oil and Antiskeptic.

=== Essential Countdown ===
In 2004, the national network counted down the Triple M Essential 2005 Songs from Boxing Day to Australia Day. The number one song was Violent Femmes' "Blister in the Sun".

Triple M have held an Essential Countdown based on listener votes since 2006, beginning in October of each year, counting the same number of songs as the year (e.g., 2006 songs in 2006). The countdown has received some criticism for being overly similar to the Triple J Hottest 100 countdown, despite the Triple J Hottest 100 only including songs from the preceding 12 months.

== Sports broadcasting ==
=== Australian Football League ===
Triple M Melbourne first broadcast Australian Football League games in 1997 after securing broadcasting rights. In 1999 Triple M expanded its coverage to Triple M Adelaide followed by Triple M Sydney and Triple M Brisbane in 2005 and Triple M Perth in 2021 with regional stations around the country also having coverage. The 2024 coverage includes the following broadcasters:

Commentators

- James Brayshaw
- Brian Taylor
- Luke Darcy
- Mark Howard
- Nathan Brown
- Leigh Montagna
- Jack Heverin
- Barry Denner
- Tim Solly
- Nigel Carmody
- Will Ralston
- Brenton Speed (NSW)
- Brad Seymour (NSW)
- Liam Flanagan (QLD)
- Brett Thomas (QLD)
- Richard Champion (QLD)
- Chris Dittmar (SA)
- Brenton Yates (SA)
- Rhett Biglands (SA)
- Mark Soderstrom (SA)
- Lachy Reid (WA)
- Ryan Daniels (WA)
- Tom Atkinson (WA)

Experts

- Jason Dunstall
- Nathan Brown
- Dale Thomas
- Leigh Montagna
- Kate McCarthy
- Isaac Smith
- Steve Johnson
- Luke Darcy
- Ash Chua (statistician)
- Billy Brownless
- Chris Johnson
- Sarah Hosking
- Josh Bruce
- Ethan Meldrum (statistician)
- Jude Bolton (NSW, VIC)
- Troy Luff (NSW)
- Simon Black (QLD)
- Tom Rockliff (QLD)
- Richard Champion (QLD)
- Bernie Vince (SA, VIC)
- Shaun Burgoyne (SA)
- Mark Ricciuto (SA)
- Dom Cassisi (SA)
- Erin Phillips (SA)
- Tom Jonas (SA)
- Taylor Walker (SA)
- Andrew Embley (WA)
- Xavier Ellis (WA)
- Mark Cometti (statistician, WA)

Boundary

- Nat Yoannidis
- Michael Roberts
- Jay Clark
- Abbey Holmes
- Ruby Schleicher
- Alex Bryant
- Ryan 'Rabs' Warren
- Troy Luff (NSW)
- Justin Edwards (NSW)
- John Kehoe (NSW)
- Belinda Mellen (QLD)
- Rhett Biglands (SA)
- Tom Jonas (SA)
- Ebony Marinoff (SA)
- Mark Thomas (SA)
- Tom Atkinson (WA)
- Britt Taylor (WA)
- Hamish Brayshaw (WA)
- Andy Taylor (TAS)

Journalists

- Damian Barrett - AFL Media Chief correspondent
- Jay Clark - Herald Sun AFL reporter
- Nat Yoannidis - Nine News sports presenter and reporter

Triple M is the only commercial FM broadcasters of the AFL in Melbourne, Adelaide, Perth, Brisbane and Sydney (although only the local teams - the Brisbane Lions and Gold Coast Suns in Brisbane and Sydney Swans and GWS Giants in Sydney respectively - are covered in the latter two cities with the local teams in Adelaide and Perth coverage in the two cities along with neutral games.) Triple M is best known for offering a less formal coverage than AM radio, providing listeners with a sense of comedy to the call while still calling the action. The station is the only radio station that provide listeners with the umpires microphones often heard on TV coverage. The TISM song ‘Shut Up the Footy’s on the Radio’ the radio stations theme song and is often heard throughout the broadcast before and after ad breaks in games.

=== National Rugby League ===
In October 2006, the National Rugby League announced that beginning in 2007, Triple M Sydney would be the exclusive commercial broadcaster of Monday Night Rugby league matches. The coverage began on 19 March with the Round 1 match between the Sydney Roosters and South Sydney Rabbitohs. Currently, Triple M broadcast 5 games a round, a Thursday night, two Friday nights, a Saturday and a Sunday, all Finals and all State of Origin matches.

The commentary team includes the following:

Andrew Johns, Peter Sterling, Dan Ginnane, Gorden Tallis, Ryan Girdler, Wendell Sailor, Mark Geyer, Emma Lawrence, Tony Squires, Paul Kent, Ben Dobbin, Brent Read and James Hooper.

=== Cricket Australia ===
In 2009, Triple M broadcast twenty20 cricket live between the Australian Cricket Team, South African Cricket Team and the New Zealand Cricket Team. Commentators included Damien Fleming, Stuart MacGill, Greg Blewett, and Brendan Julian.

In December 2016, Triple M became the first FM radio station to broadcast test cricket. Commentators included James Brayshaw, Kerry O'Keeffe, Michael Slater, Brett Lee, Brad Haddin, Merv Hughes, Darren Berry, H.G Nelson, Jules Schiller, Lawrence Mooney, Gus Worland, Neroli Meadows, Isa Guha, Mick Molloy and Mark Howard. In May 2018, it was announced that Triple M will no longer broadcast cricket, after the station chose not to renew their contract with Cricket Australia. However in August 2021, Triple M announced that they will return to broadcasting Test Cricket along with One Day Internationals played in the next three summers starting in the 2021/22 season which included the Ashes Series.

=== Horse Racing ===
In 2026, Triple M expanded into horse racing with the launch of Triple M Racing, providing coverage of major Victorian Spring Racing Carnival events across Melbourne radio and LiSTNR. Coverage features former Melbourne Cup-winning jockey Glen Boss, broadcaster Michael Felgate and reporter Caty Price.
