= Hit 100.9 =

Coordinates: 42°52′40″S 147°19′41″E

hit100.9 Hobart
- Hobart, Tasmania; Australia
- Frequency: 100.9 MHz

Programming
- Language: English
- Format: Contemporary hit radio
- Network: Hit Network

Ownership
- Owner: Southern Cross Austereo; (Southern Cross Austereo Pty Limited)
- Sister stations: Triple M Hobart

History
- First air date: 4 July 1990
- Call sign meaning: Station branded as "Triple T"

Technical information
- Licensing authority: ACMA
- ERP: 25,000 watts
- HAAT: 406 m

Links
- Public licence information: Profile
- Website: Official website

hit100.9 Hobart (100.9 MHz, call sign 7TTT) is a radio station in Hobart, Tasmania, Australia. It is owned and operated by Southern Cross Austereo's Hit Network.

== Station history ==
hit100.9 previously 100.9 Sea FM, began as Triple T in 1990. The station was started by local Hobart businessman John Bender who obtained financial support from a number of Hobart business people, radio industry veterans including now Newcastle-based long time radio host Carol Duncan, and a minority interest by Austereo. As a result, the station was originally aligned with the Austereo network affiliate. This meant, during the Triple T years, the station scheduled Austereo programming, such as Martin/Molloy, Take 40 Australia, Ugly Phil's Hot 30, Friday Home Free, Dr Feelgood's Pillow Talk, The Hot Hits and Party Hard. Triple T also adapted local versions of national formats, such as The Morning Crew (with their "Crazy Calls" and "Battle Of The Sexes"), Two Ups At Two, Triple Plays and The Happy Hour. For a few years, the only difference between Triple T and other Today, Austereo Network stations (such as network base-station, Fox FM) was Triple T's logo not incorporating the Today blue globe - much like Perth's PMFM at the time, now known as '92.9 Triple M Perth'.

In 1996, the Bender family purchased controlling interest from all minority shareholders as the station struggled financially.

In 1997, the Bender's attracted international broadcaster, Andrew Reimer (with experience at Austereo and as a USA radio station owner/operator), as an equal owner and general manager. Mr. Reimer led a change in programming after extensive market research and launched a new Breakfast program "Todd & Dave" with Todd Campbell and David Noonan. Kim Geale joined the team as news presenter and when Todd moved to work in Sydney radio in 1998, the show was rebranded "The Kim & Dave Show". The music format shifted from current pop/rock to a daytime format targeting 18- to 39-year-olds, mixing Classic Rock and new music and followed by an evening program 'The Hot 30' targeting 12 to 24-year-olds. Community promotions, live broadcasts, and aggressive marketing saw Triple T move to the top station in the market in the target age groups and for the first time profitability.

In 1998, management negotiated with Tote Tasmania who held an unused FM license and launched a second FM to join Triple T. The new station, MAGIC 107FM, based upon market research, was targeted at 40 to 65-year-olds with a music format of the 1950s, 1960s, and 1970s coupled with John Laws in the morning shift. This strategy was to complement Triple T's focus on an under 40 market. In the initial radio survey, MAGIC 107FM captured over one third of the Hobart radio listeners and dominated its target market.

With the higher audience share of Triple T and the new success of MAGIC 107, the two stations captured an increased advertising revenue representing almost 70% of the market. The success of the two stations attracted the owners of the developing RG Capital radio network to purchase the two stations in July, 2000 and appoint Mr. Reimer as general manager.

Up until 2001, Triple T used the slogan "Great Classics & Today's Best New Rock". Then, their slogan was changed to "Hobart's Best Music".

In 2004, Triple T was rebranded as Sea FM (to align with the network of RG Capital stations). RG Capital was in turn purchased by Macquarie Regional Radioworks, now Southern Cross Austereo.

In December 2008, the "Kim & Dave Show" moved from Sea FM to Heart 107.3 and continue to be Hobart's top rated Breakfast program.

In June 2014, the station moved into the brand new media centre developed by Southern Cross Austereo with stable mate Heart 107.3 and Seven Tasmania at 2 Melville Street. This move finally co-located all the Southern Cross Austereo brands, staff and technical assets in Hobart, in the one location.

On 4 February 2016, Southern Cross Austereo forged ahead with rolling out the Hit Network Branding to more markets. The launch saw the regional centric Sea FM brand dropped to be replaced with Hit 100.9.

Hit 100.9 along with all the other High Power FM services covering Hobart transmits from the Broadcast Australia site on Mt Wellington. Hit 100.9 signal originates from 2 (1 on air and 1 standby) Harris Valve driven transmitters. The Harris Transmitters have been retired and replaced with Nautel Solid State Transmitters.

In June 2026, Hobart’s number one breakfast radio show Dan and Christie with Dan Taylor and Christie Hayes was cancelled as part of a Southern Cross Media Group restructure. The show had been on air since 2022, replacing the Jimmy and Nath Show, and attracted 21.2% of Hobart listeners at the most recent radio survey. Dan and Christie were replaced by the Newcastle based hit106.9 breakfast Jess and Rohan show.

== 7TTT and DAB+ ==
Early in 2019 DAB started commercial broadcasting in Hobart.

As a commercial FM operator in the Hobart area, 7TTT was granted space on the new DAB Mux.

This MUX is operated by Digital Radio Broadcasting Hobart Pty Ltd, and operates at 20,000W on 202.928Mhz. It utilises vertically polarised transmissions and is co-located in the Broadcast Australia Site on Mt Wellington, the same facility that houses 7TTT's FM Service.

7TTT is available on DAB, along with Southern Cross Austereo stable mate Easy Hits.
