= Samuel Forsyth (Methodist) =

Australian minister

Samuel "Sam" Forsyth OBE (1 May 1881 – 24 August 1960) was a Methodist minister and social worker in South Australia.

== Life ==
Born in Aghyaran near Castlederg, County Tyrone, Northern Ireland, Forsyth was raised in a devout Methodist family. At the age of 15, he began an apprenticeship as a draper. In 1901, he migrated to Australia and initially stayed with an uncle, who was the father of Major General John Forsyth. He later moved to Melbourne and secured a position with Foy and Gibson. He left for New Zealand, where he worked for a year at Wellington.

He moved to South Australia in 1905 to study at W. L. Morton's Hope Lodge Missionary Training College at Belair. He and friend Tom Willason went on a preaching tour of Yorke Peninsula. He married Ida Rosely Nankivell ( – 24 June 1922) on 2 October 1907 at Maitland. He was ordained a minister of the Kent Town Methodist Church in 1912. Around 1914 he was in charge of the South Broken Hill Methodist churches.

After the death of his wife, he married Ida Muriel Brummitt (ca.1884 – 24 October 1953) of Medindie on 29 March 1923. In 1929 he was appointed superintendent of the Adelaide's Central Methodist Mission, a position he held for a record 23 years. In June 1930 he founded the Kuitpo Industrial Colony, with W. H. Tucker as manager and hon. secretary. where men could work for board and lodging. The area, of nearly 1000 acres, was granted by the State Government on perpetual lease on condition that it be used for charitable purposes (the Kuitpo Colony later became a rehabilitation centre). In 1931 he founded the South Australian Council of Charitable Relief Organizations.

In 1943 he negotiated the Mission's purchase of radio station 5KA as both a source of income and a propaganda medium. In 1944 he founded Aldersgate Retirement Village at Felixstow. Forsyth himself retired in 1952 and died at home six years later. He was buried at Payneham.

== Family ==
He and Ida had two sons; Bob and Elliott. His residence for many years was 6 Adelaide Terrace, Magill.

== Recognition ==
He was appointed OBE. in 1937.

== Sources ==
Vogt, A. E., 'Forsyth, Samuel (1881–1960)', Australian Dictionary of Biography, National Centre of Biography, Australian National University, https://adb.anu.edu.au/biography/forsyth-samuel-6215/text10691, accessed 26 March 2012.
