= Paul Thompson (broadcaster) =

Australian broadcasting executive

Paul Thompson is an Australian broadcasting executive.

== Career ==
Thompson has launched, acquired, developed and managed broadcasting stations and networks throughout Australia in a career which started in 1965. He is credited with building two distinct national radio broadcasting networks from inception.

Having established Adelaide's first commercial FM radio station, Double SA FM, in the 1980s, he was responsible for setting up Austereo, which he guided as Chief Executive Officer for 15 years. In 1996, DMG Radio Australia was launched with Thompson as CEO.

Now known as Nova Entertainment and owned by Lachlan Murdoch, the company owns the contemporary hit radio-formatted radio network Nova (with stations targeting under-40 listeners in Sydney, Melbourne, Brisbane, Adelaide and Perth), along with the smoothfm network (aimed at older listeners) in Sydney and Melbourne, Star 104.5 on the Central Coast and Adelaide’s only commercial talk station FIVEaa.

Thompson was one of two inaugural inductees in the Commercial Radio Australia "Hall of Fame" in 2002.

In 2008 he stepped down as Chairman of DMG Radio Australia.
