= Triple M Gippsland =

Warragul, Victoria; Australia
- Broadcast area: Gippsland
- Frequency: FM: 94.3 MHz
- Branding: Gippsland's Triple M - 94.3 & 97.9 Triple M

Programming
- Format: Mainstream rock
- Network: Triple M

Ownership
- Owner: Southern Cross Austereo; (Votraint No. 691 Pty Ltd)

History
- First air date: 3 May 2002 (as Sea FM)
- Call sign meaning: SEA FM

Technical information
- Power: 7 kW
- Transmitter coordinates: 38.262006°S 146.046258°E
- Repeater: FM: 97.9 MHz Traralgon

Links
- Website: www.triplem.com.au/gippsland

Triple M Gippsland (official callsign: 3SEA) is a commercial radio station owned and operated by Southern Cross Austereo as part of the Triple M network. The station is broadcast to townships in the Gippsland region of Victoria from studios in Traralgon.

The station commenced broadcasting in 2002 as 94.3 Sea FM as a supplementary license to 3GG. On 4 July 2005, the station relaunched as Star FM in line with Macquarie Regional RadioWorks' other Victorian stations, retaining its contemporary hit radio music format. On 15 December 2016, the station was again relaunched as Hit Gippsland.

On 20 July 2020, the station flipped formats to mainstream rock as Triple M. Networked programming, including Carrie & Tommy and Hughesy & Kate were replaced by that of the Triple M network. Despite being part of the Hit Network, the station had previously broadcast Triple M AFL coverage as the only Southern Cross Austereo-owned station in the Gippsland region.

In 2023 Triple M relocated its broadcasting operations to studios in Traralgon. The studio on Coonoc road is shared with ACE Radio's TRFM and Gippsland Gold as well as Southern Cross 10.

== Programming ==
Local programming is produced and broadcast from the station's Traralgon studios from 6 am–10 am weekdays. The station's local output consists of a four-hour breakfast show presented by Ed Cowlishaw.

Networked programming originates from studios in Gold Coast, and Melbourne.

=== Shows ===
- 6 am to 9 am – Ed for Breakfast
- 9 am to 2 pm – Alo Baker
- 2 pm to 4 pm – Lu and Jarch
- 4 pm to 6 pm – The Rush Hour with JB and Billy

== Transmission Quality ==
The station transmits from a main transmitter and a repeater:

- 94.3 FM is broadcast from the main transmitter which is a site near Yarragon South (coords) at 7 kW Power.
- 97.9 FM is broadcast from the repeater which is a site near Tyers (coords) at a power of 500W.
