= Joe Gersh =

Australian businessman

Joseph Gersh AM is an Australian businessman who works as a director for public and private companies in Australia. He is also the founder and Executive Chairman of Gersh Investment Partners Limited (GIPL). With interests in real estate, banking and the arts, Gersh has been recognized as an influential figure in the business community, particularly in Melbourne. He is also a prominent member of the Australian Jewish community. He currently serves as a direct Ministerial appointment on the Board of the Australian Broadcasting Corporation (ABC).

In 2006, he was awarded the Order of Australia for his service to business, government, the arts and the community.

== Education ==
Gersh is a graduate of Mount Scopus Memorial College where he was school captain in 1972.

Gersh attended the University of Melbourne and graduated in 1979 with a Bachelor of Commerce LLB (Honors).

== Career ==
He formerly occupied the position of a senior partner and Chairman of the Management Committee at the Melbourne law firm Arnold Bloch Leibler (ABL) from 1982 to 1999. He was appointed as a Director of the Federal Airports Corporation from 1995 to 1996.

Gersh is a foundation Director of The Reserve Bank of Australia's Payments System Board.

He founded Gersh Investment Partners Limited and Gersh Advisory in July 2000.

From July 2003 to December 2012, Gersh was the inaugural Chairman of the Australian Reinsurance Pool Corporation.

He was a member of the Payments System Board of the Reserve Bank of Australia between 1998 and 2013.

In 2008, Gersh paid failing Gold Coast financier MFS $20 Million to reacquire GIPL from the company. GIPL had been sold to MFS in August 2007 at an implied value of $100 million.

In May 2013, GIPL created an alliance with Supalai Public Company Limited with the company estimating to spend $60 million of its annual overseas budget into Australia.

In May 2018, he was appointed to the Board of the ABC.

In November 2018, he appeared before the Senate Select committee into the ABC scandal, Gersh played a special role in the turmoil that engulfed the ABC – he was selected by the board to meet with Michelle Guthrie to discuss her allegations of inappropriate conduct by Justin Milne. At that meeting – at the A1 Canteen in Sydney, near the ABC's Ultimo HQ – he asked Ms Guthrie several times if she wanted to file a formal complaint against Mr Milne, and she refused. He also asked Ms Guthrie if she wished to resign, and she said "no". Mr Gersh goes on to say that he believes the ABC board works in a collegiate and respectful manner. He concedes it could perhaps do with an additional member who has extensive experience in media or digital transformation.

== The arts ==
Gersh is a supporter of the arts with a particular focus on promoting Melbourne as a cultural centre. He has been a Director of the Sydney Institute since 2003.

He was Deputy Chairman of the Australia Council for the Arts from 2006 to 2009. He also held honorary positions as chairman at the National Institute of Circus Arts from 2005 to 2006 and chairman at Artbank, the Government Art rental body, from December 2000 – 2009.

== Community ==
He has been a prominent figure in the Jewish community and was the president of the Jewish Community Council of Victoria from 1990 to 1993 and vice president of the Australian Institute of Jewish Affairs from 1987 to 1992.

He also continues to serve as life-councilor for Mount Scopus Memorial College.

== Personal ==
He is separated with four children.
