= High Voltage Radio =

- Australia
- Broadcast area: Sydney, Melbourne, Brisbane, Adelaide and Perth, Australia
- Frequency: DAB+
- Branding: Triple M's High Voltage Radio; Mix 94.5's High Voltage Radio (Perth)

Programming
- Language: English
- Format: Music from AC/DC (Classic rock, hard rock)
- Affiliations: Triple M

Ownership
- Owner: Austereo
- Sister stations: Triple M Mix 94.5

History
- First air date: 10 February 2010
- Last air date: 15 March 2010

High Voltage Radio (identified as Triple M's High Voltage Radio in Sydney, Melbourne, Brisbane and Adelaide and Mix 94.5's High Voltage Radio in Perth) was a pop up Digital Radio station broadcasting nationally in Australia while AC/DC were touring the country in 2010. The station was part of Austereo's Triple M network and only played AC/DC music.

== Programming ==
The station exclusively played music by AC/DC and included the band's biggest hits, album tracks, live performances and rarities. Byron Cooke, the anchor of Triple M Sydney's Grill Team, was the host of the station and conducted interviews with the band, talked to people going to the concerts and talked about unknown AC/DC trivia.

Due to the "pop up" nature of the station, it was only broadcast in Australia between Wednesday, 10 February and Monday, 15 March 2010 to coincide with AC/DC's Australian Black Ice tour. After Monday, 15 March 2010, the station was reformatted to become Lady Gaga only, under the name of Radio Gaga.

== Availability ==
The station was heard on DAB+ radios in Sydney, Melbourne, Brisbane, Adelaide and Perth.

The station also streamed online at the Triple M website.
