= Triple M Hobart =

Hobart, Tasmania; Australia
- Frequency: 107.3 MHz

Programming
- Language: English
- Format: Mainstream rock; Classic rock; Adult contemporary
- Affiliations: Triple M

Ownership
- Owner: Southern Cross Austereo
- Sister stations: Hit 100.9

History
- First air date: 19 April 1937
- Former call signs: 7HT
- Former names: Heart 107.3; Magic 107; 7HT

Links
- Website: Official website

Triple M Hobart (call sign: 7XXX) is a radio station in Hobart, Tasmania, Australia. It is part of the Triple M network owned by Southern Cross Austereo.

== History ==
Triple M Hobart, formerly Heart 107.3 and before that, Magic 107, began as 7HT on 19 April 1937. The station had obtained an FM conversion licence. Subsequently, a consortium led by Andrew Reimer and local Hobart businessman John Bender who obtained financial support, arranged to lease the FM licence.

The station's first local breakfast host was Brett Marley, who had been the former drive host on 7HOFM. The line-up also included well known Melbourne announcer and Hey Hey It's Saturday announcer John Blackman as well as Alan Jones.

In 1998, management negotiated with the Tote Tasmania who held an unused FM licence and launched a second FM to join existing station, Triple T. The new station, Magic 107, based upon market research, was targeted at 40- to 65-year-olds with a music format of the 1950s, 1960s, and 1970s coupled with John Laws in the morning shift. This strategy was to complement Triple T's focus on an under 40 market. In the initial radio survey, Magic 107 captured over one third of the Hobart radio listeners and dominated its target market.

With the higher audience share of Triple T and the new success of Magic 107, the two stations captured an increased advertising revenue representing almost 70% of the market. The success of the two stations attracted the owners of the developing RG Capital radio network to purchase the two stations in July 2000 and appoint Mr Reimer as general manager.

In 2006, Magic 107 was rebranded as Heart 107.3 (to be aligned with that network of Macquarie Regional Radioworks).

In 2009, Hobart radio duo Kim & Dave moved from Sea FM Hobart, around this time, the Southern Cross Austereo became a major stakeholder in Heart 107.3 and its sister station Sea FM.

In 2014 Kim Napier left the "Kim & Dave Show" to work in Adelaide and was replaced by Kylie Baxter, who had been a journalist and newsreader on the former Triple T in the beginnings of the 90s.

On 15 December 2016, The station changed its name to Hobart's 107.3 Triple M to align with Southern Cross Austereo rebranding.

For 2017, Kylie Baxter returned to the Triple M newsroom as a journalist and newsreader, and was replaced by Alison Plath.

In 2019, 7 Tasmania Nightly News and Spencer Gulf Nightly News weather presenter Britt Aylen joined the station to present The Triple M CoMMMunity Calendar, a daily guide to events around Hobart, with regular TV spots airing during 7 Tasmania Nightly News.

7XXX transmits from the Broadcast Australia facility on Mount Wellington. Its current transmitters are Nautel with a main and standby setup.

In October 2019 after initial speculation that the Dave Noonan Show with Al Plath would not be returning to Hobart Radio in 2020. In a statement released the Executive General Manager of Southern Cross Austereo thanked Noonan for his contribution and work within Hobart Radio "I would like to thank Dave for his outstanding contribution to not only SCA Hobart, but to the wider Hobart community." Noonan's final show was broadcast to Hobart on Friday 18 October 2019 live from the Co-op Toyota dealership in North Hobart as part of Triple M's $200,000 Water & Wheels. It was reported by The Mercury that approximately 80 people gathered to share in "Crazy" Dave Noonan's final show.

== 7XXX and DAB+ ==
Early in 2019 DAB started commercial broadcasting in Hobart.

As a commercial FM operator in the Hobart area, 7XXX was granted space on the new DAB Mux.

This MUX is operated by Digital Radio Broadcasting Hobart Pty Ltd, and operates at 20,000W on 202.928Mhz. It utilises vertically polarised transmissions and is co-located in the Broadcast Australia Site on Mt Wellington, the same facility that houses 7XXX's FM service.

7XXX is available on DAB, along with Southern Cross Austereo stable mates Triple M Classic Rock Digital, and Triple M Country.
