= Triple M Dubbo =

Triple M Dubbo 93.5
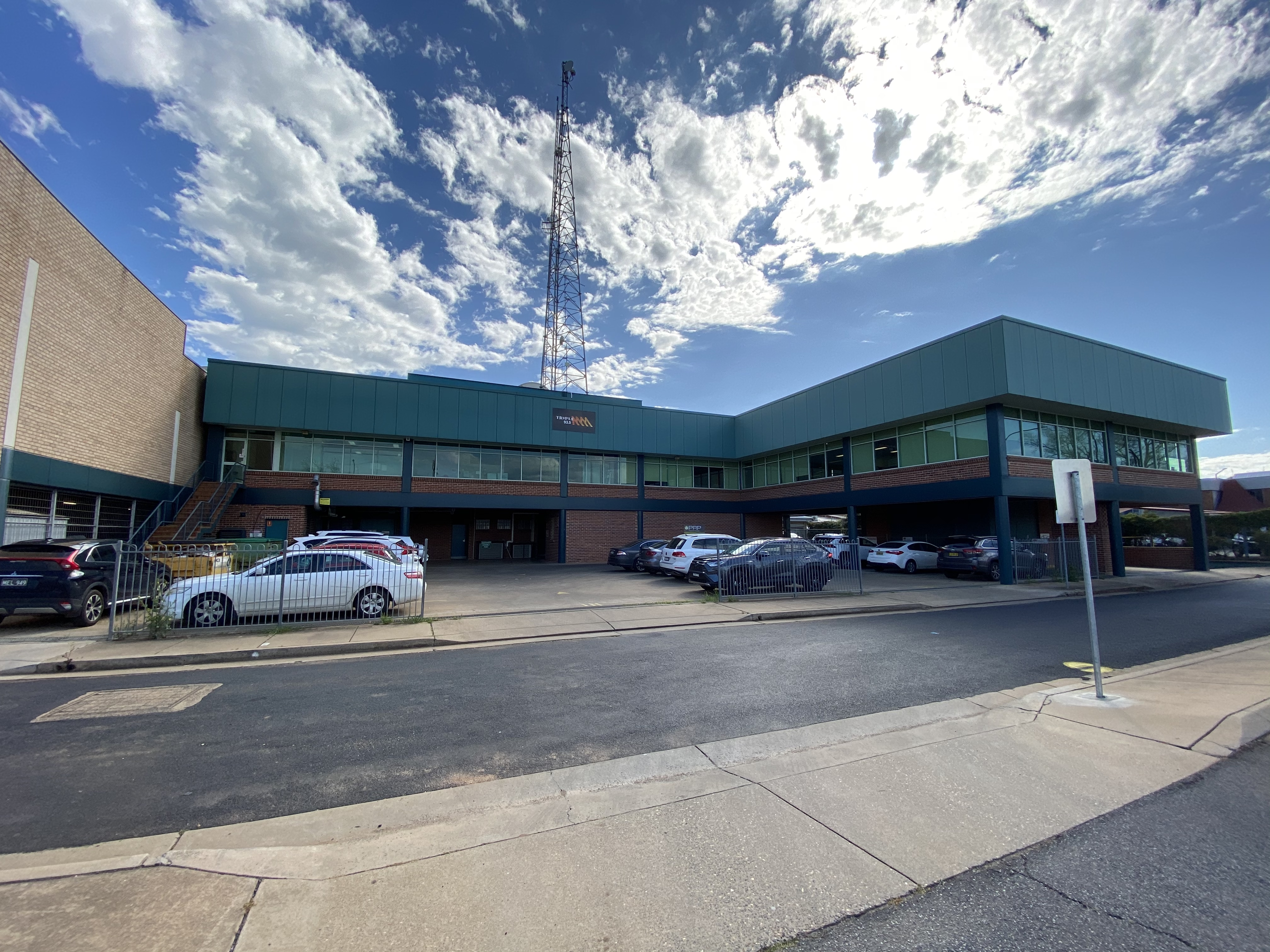
- Triple M Dubbo studios

Dubbo; Australia
- Broadcast area: Dubbo, New South Wales, Australia
- Frequency: 93.5 MHZ

Programming
- Format: Adult contemporary Mainstream rock

Ownership
- Owner: Southern Cross Austereo

Links
- Website: www.triplem.com.au/dubbo

2DBO, branded on-air as Triple M Dubbo 93.5, is an Australian radio station owned by Southern Cross Austereo. The station is based in Dubbo, New South Wales.

It is also broadcast on relay transmitters in Gilgandra (101.3 FM), and Narromine (94.9 FM).

In 2023, they had a breakfast show with Jodi Howard and Chris ‘Matho’ Mathison.
