= Hit101.3 Central Coast =

Coordinates: 33°25′23″S 151°23′58″E

Hit101.3
- Gosford, New South Wales; Australia
- Broadcast area: Central Coast; Newcastle; Sydney
- Frequency: 101.3 MHz FM
- RDS: Hit101.3

Programming
- Language: English
- Format: Hot adult contemporary
- Network: Hit Network

Ownership
- Owner: Southern Cross Austereo

History
- First air date: 15 September 1990
- Former names: Hit101.3 Sea FM; 101.3 Sea FM; Coast Rock FM
- Call sign meaning: 2 – New South Wales; Central Coast FM

Links
- Website: https://www.hit.com.au/centralcoast

Hit101.3 (call sign: 2CFM) is an Australian radio station located on the New South Wales Central Coast, part of Southern Cross Austereo's Hit Network. Hit101.3 broadcasts from the Central Coast Radio Centre on Henry Parry Drive, in Gosford, along with sister station Triple M Central Coast. Its broadcast area is the Central Coast, however the station can be heard on FM at points as far as Newcastle, Sydney and parts of the Blue Mountains. The station was first broadcast from studios located in Mann Street, Gosford, where it was known on-air as Coast Rock FM, and is now broadcast from Henry Parry Drive, Gosford.

== The station ==
Hit101.3 primarily plays a Hot Adult contemporary music format with a range of music from the 1990s to current hits, in alignment with most of SCA's regional Hit Network stations.

Its current weekday lineup consists locally of Maz Compton & Matt Baseley from 5-9am, broadcast across Hit Network's NSW regional stations from Gosford. Nic Kelly hosts a local Mornings program from 9am-12pm. Harry Boucher hosts 12-3pm across Hit's regional network stations including the Central Coast, before Carrie & Tommy from 3-6pm, Hughesy, Ed & Erin from 6-7pm, Jimmy & Nath 7-9pm, before music runs 12am-1am, and best bits from the network's two drive programs run 1am-5am.

== History ==
Gosford Communications first submitted an application for a broadcast licence in August 1987. The Australian Broadcasting Tribunal(ABT) granted a commercial FM broadcast licence to Gosford Communications, a wholly owned subsidiary of Country Television Services; a private company owned by Ted and Miriam Rodgers, in August 1988. Within a month of being awarded the broadcast licence, Wesgo (who owned the only other commercial station in the market at the time - AM station 2GO) launched an appeal against the ABT for granting a second commercial licence, and their appeal was upheld. A second appeal was launched by the ABT against the judge's decision to uphold Wesgo's appeal. After time in front of the Full Bench of the Federal Court, Gosford Communications were finally given the go-ahead. Initially, Gosford Communications owned 60% of the station, the other 40% was publicly floated; with shares offered to the local community and employees.

On 1 November 1989 Country Television Services was delisted from the Australian Securities Exchange when it was taken over by Roslyndale Securities.

Coast Rock FM was first broadcast from newly constructed studios located in Mann Street, Gosford on 15 September 1990. The first song officially broadcast was Start Me Up by The Rolling Stones.

Sometime in the early 1990s, Coast Rock FM was purchased by Queensland TV operators, and owners of rival station 2GO; The Sunshine Television Network/STQ. In 1995 STQ was purchased by the Seven Network. Due to broadcast regulations at the time, Channel 7 was restricted to owning just one "type" of media outlet in any given area. As the Central Coast is considered part of the Sydney Metropolitan area, controversially, the Central Coast and Sydney's broadcast area overlap quite significantly - this factor forced Channel 7 to divest Coast Rock FM to another operator.

Sea FM Limited purchased Coast Rock FM and 2GO FM from Channel 7 in January 1996. The company changed its name from Sea FM Limited to RG Capital in 1996, due to the acquisition of 2GO FM - future plans would be to change Coast Rock FM to Sea FM, but in order to maintain a point of difference between the new Sea FM and 2GO FM, the parent company's name would have to change.

Later that year, Coast Rock underwent significant changes. In the space of one night, Coast Rock was essentially "switched off" at its Mann Street studios, and moved to join former rival 2GO in their studio complex in Henry Parry Drive. Previous Sea FM Program Director, Allan Cameron, was the last announcer to do a live shift from the old studios in Gosford. A few months later, Coast Rock was re-branded as Sea FM, to match RG Capitals' other radio properties - 90.9 Sea FM (Gold Coast) and 91.9 Sea FM (Sunshine Coast). The first song to be played by the new Sea FM was Things Can Only Get Better by D:Ream.

RG Capital Radio PTY LTD was floated on the ASX in October 2000, and subsequently changed its name to RG Capital Radio Limited.

In 2002, RG Capital entered into negotiations to sell 101.3 Sea FM to DMG Radio Australia. The deal would have been a trade-off for the joint acquisition of a new FM broadcast license for the Central Coast, along with the purchase of number of existing radio licenses in regional Victoria. A full agreement could never be reached, however - and this saw the proposed venture fall through by December 2002. DMG eventually went on to successfully bid for the new FM license, thus paving the way for the birth of the Central Coast's third FM commercial radio station, Star 104.5.

In June 2004, Sea FM's parent company, RG Capital Radio was acquired by Macquarie Bank for a reported A$173 m. The newly formed Macquarie Media Group (MMG) then purchased DMG Radio Australia's regional portfolio in September of the same year for A$193 m. Macquarie Regional Radioworks was formed to oversee the radio operations, and maintained a similar management structure to that of RG Capital. November 2006 saw MMG purchase a 13.8 per cent stake in rival radio operator, Southern Cross Broadcasting, which put a number of Australian Television stations under the MMG umbrella. In December 2009, MMG security holders voted in favour of a conversion from a triple-stapled structure to a single ASX-listed company. MMG was renamed Southern Cross Media Group with former RG Capital Radio CEO Rhys Holleran as the Chief Executive Officer.

Until 2015, the station used the Radio Computing Services (RCS) NexGen Digital Automation system when on air, complemented by Adobe Audition. Its three production suites utilise the latest Pro Tools systems, and A-ware Software's MusicMaster v4 was used for Music Scheduling until 2015. All songs, commercials and station identification information were played digitally from NexGen, using a high bit-rate proprietary version of the MPEG-1 Audio Layer II codec. Since 2015, the station has used RCS' Zetta software on-air, and was the first station in SCA's vast network this software was rolled out to. RCS's GSelector is used in accompaniment.

Central Coast Radio was also the birthplace of Southern Cross Austereo's network music library, a fully catalogued CD library consisting of over 200,000 High Definition music tracks. Research began for the CD library in 2006, gathering the required music from various sources, in preparation for the Network-wide rollout of the NexGen Digital Automation system. All songs for every station in the Southern Cross Austereo group originate from this library. The music was transferred to all stations via a proprietary data transfer system, originally built into NexGen for the Clear Channel group of stations.

On 15 December 2016, Sea FM Central Coast became visually branded as Hit101.3 Sea FM in Southern Cross Austereo's mass re-branding of its regional radio network. Along with Sea FM Gold Coast they were able to retain their heritage 'Sea FM' name verbally.

In October 2019, the station was officially rebranded to "Hit 101.3" along with other regional Hit stations.
