= Greg Blewett =

Australian cricketer

Personal information
- Full name: Gregory Scott Blewett
- Born: 29 October 1971 (age 55); Adelaide, South Australia
- Nickname: Blewy
- Height: 183 cm (6 ft 0 in)
- Batting: Right-handed
- Bowling: Right-arm medium
- Role: All-rounder
- Relatives: Bob Blewett (father)

International information
- National side: Australia (1995–2000)
- Test debut (cap 363): 26 January 1995 v England
- Last Test: 24 March 2000 v New Zealand
- ODI debut (cap 122): 15 February 1995 v England
- Last ODI: 26 January 1999 v England

Domestic team information
- Years: Team
- 1991/92–2006/07: South Australia
- 1999: Yorkshire
- 2001: Nottinghamshire
- 2003: Kent
- 2004: Surrey

Career statistics
Competition	Test	ODI	FC	LA
Matches	46	32	232	213
Runs scored	2,552	551	17,352	6,479
Batting average	34.02	20.40	44.49	34.10
100s/50s	4/15	0/2	43/86	8/34
Top score	214	57*	268	131
Balls bowled	1,436	749	11,742	4,614
Wickets	14	14	140	115
Bowling average	51.42	46.14	43.57	33.66
5 wickets in innings	0	0	1	0
10 wickets in match	0	0	0	0
Best bowling	2/9	2/6	5/29	4/16
Catches/stumpings	45/–	7/–	179/–	66/–
- Source: Cricinfo, 4 June 2010

Gregory Scott Blewett (born 29 October 1971) is an Australian international retired cricketer who played Test cricket and One-Day Internationals between 1995 and 2000.

== Cricket career ==
The son of Bob Blewett who represented South Australia in the 1970s, Blewett was born in Adelaide. Blewett was an AIS Australian Cricket Academy scholarship holder in 1990. He began his domestic career in 1991–92 playing for South Australia in the Sheffield Shield and One Day domestic tournament competition in Australia. He made his international debut for the Australian team playing for Australia A during a World Series Cup tournament against Australia in 1994–95. During this tournament he displayed his batting performances against former Australian fast bowler, Craig McDermott. In January 1995, he made his Test debut for Australia against England at the Adelaide Oval in South Australia; scoring a century on his debut match. He followed that with a century in the WACA Ground in Perth during his second match and scored a century at Edgbaston in England in 1997 thus scoring three centuries in his first three Ashes Test matches.

He also represented the national team in One Day International matches. During his peak, he batted with aggression and he was effective against both fast bowlers and spinners. He was particularly strong square of the wicket, which was rewarded on his home ground, the Adelaide Oval, where the square boundaries are shorter. He was also an effective medium pacebowler (average bowling speed 125 km/h). His highest Test match score was 214 runs, against South Africa in Johannesburg in South Africa. Most of those runs were achieved with his former teammate and captain, Steve Waugh, with whom he was involved in one of the highest batting partnerships in cricket when the pair scored 385 runs together, batting for an entire day's play without losing a wicket.

Despite his qualities as a batsman, he was known to struggle against spin bowling. He has been dismissed (out) in the past by several spin bowlers, including the former Pakistan and Indian spinners, Mushtaq Ahmed and Anil Kumble. After achieving a successful first year in the international cricket, he encountered Mushtaq Ahmed when Pakistan visited Australia in the 1995–96 season. He was unable to pick which way Mushtaq's deliveries were turning and was continuously dismissed in the tournament by being declared Leg before wicket or being bowled, either playing down the wrong line or not offering shot to a googly that turned into his stumps. He was subsequently replaced by Ricky Ponting, but in 1996 he regained his batting position after Ponting himself had fallen upon hard times. Blewett then performed well with the bat, until the 1998 tour to India, where he struggled against Kumble and he was dropped in favour of Justin Langer. However, upon the retirement of captain Mark Taylor in 1999, Blewett was selected to become an opening batsman, until he was dropped from the Australian team in favour of Matthew Hayden in early 2000 after a period of poor performances, which ended his international career. He retired from professional cricket in 2006 when he played his last match in First-class cricket and One Day Domestic matches against Queensland and Tasmania.

Waugh, who captained Australia from 1999 to 2004, said that Blewett had "a technical batting problem in his defence, when facing deliveries and he often left a gap between bat and pad." Test and One Day International averages of 34 and 20 respectively also reflect his inability to, according to Waugh, "align...talent with results". Waugh attributed this to a "lack of discipline and...self-belief."

== Media career ==
Since retiring from professional cricket, Blewett has pursued a commentating career.

In December 2013, Blewett became a member of the Fairfax Radio Network (FRN) commentary team that broadcast selected Test matches, One Day Internationals, the Big Bash League (BBL) and T20 International matches on network stations including 3AW Melbourne, 2UE Sydney, 4BC Brisbane, 6PR Perth and on digital radio.

In 2018 he joined the Seven Network as a commentator for Test Cricket and Big Bash League and Triple M Adelaide as a co-host of the Dead Set Legends show.

== Coaching career ==
Blewett was named fielding consultant of Australia for the one-day tri-series in Zimbabwe and for their matches against Pakistan in the UAE in 2014. He completed a level three coaching accreditation in 2014 and worked with Australia A and the National Performance Squad at the National Cricket Performance Centre in Brisbane.

== Personal life ==
Blewett's first marriage was to Adelaide radio personality, Jodie Blewett, and they had a daughter. He married his second wife, Katheryn Raptopoulos, in 2014 and they have a son.
