= Radio Gaga (radio station) =

- Australia
- Broadcast area: Sydney, Melbourne, Brisbane, Adelaide and Perth, Australia
- Frequency: DAB+
- Branding: Radio Gaga

Programming
- Language: English
- Format: Music from Lady Gaga (Contemporary hit radio)
- Affiliations: Today Network

Ownership
- Owner: Austereo
- Sister stations: Today Network

History
- First air date: 15 March 2010
- Last air date: 17 May 2010

Radio Gaga was a pop up digital radio station broadcasting nationally in Australia while Lady Gaga toured the country in 2010. The station was part of Austereo's Today Network and only played Lady Gaga's music.

== Programming ==
The station exclusively played music by Lady Gaga and included her biggest hits, album tracks, live performances and rarities. Tim Lee, an announcer at Fox FM and former host of the Hot30 Countdown, was the host of the station and played interview grabs with Lady Gaga from the Kyle and Jackie O show on 2Day FM. Hamish & Andy talked to people going to the concerts and talked about unknown Lady Gaga trivia.

Due to the "pop up" nature of the station, it was only broadcast in Australia between Monday, 15 March and Monday, 17 May 2010 to coincide with Lady Gaga's Australian Monster Ball tour. After Monday, 17 May 2010, the station became I See Red Radio raising money for the Red Shield Appeal.

== Availability ==
The station was heard on DAB+ radios in Sydney, Melbourne, Brisbane, Adelaide and Perth.
