= Radar (radio station) =

Digital radio station in Australia

Coordinates: 27°28′00.58″S 153°00′57.22″E

Radar Radio

Sydney, Melbourne, Brisbane, Adelaide and Perth; Australia
- Broadcast area: Australia and Online
- Frequency: DAB+
- Branding: Radar Radio

Programming
- Format: New Music

Ownership
- Owner: Austereo (2009–2011); Southern Cross Austereo (2011–2013)

History
- First air date: 4 May 2009
- Last air date: 25 November 2013

Radar Radio (also referred to as Radar Music, colloquially called Radar) was an Australian digital radio station. It was run by Southern Cross Austereo from its launch date on 11 December 2008 to the closure of the station Monday 25 November 2013. The Radar Radio website was also taken down on the same day as the station closure.

== History ==
Radar started broadcasting online before Digital Radio launched in Australia on 11 December 2008. The station only played unsigned bands and there were no announcers on air.

In 2009, the station commenced broadcasting on Digital Radio as soon as it was rolled out in Sydney, Melbourne, Brisbane, Adelaide and Perth.

In late 2009, the station changed its format from unsigned music to new music. While unsigned bands were still played, they only appeared every fourth song. At the same time, Reegan McLaughlin was employed as an announcer and appeared frequently on air.

In November 2013, the station was replaced with Triple M Classic Rock.

== Television ==
From 2011 to 2013, a television version of Radar was broadcast on the Southern Cross Ten and Southern Cross Television TV stations across regional Australia.

== Availability ==
The station was heard on DAB+ radios in Sydney, Melbourne, Brisbane, Adelaide and Perth.

The station also streamed online at the Radar Radio website and on the Radar Radio iPad app.
