= Triple M Adelaide =

Triple M radio station in Adelaide, South Australia

Coordinates: 34.983808°S 138.708315°E

Triple M Adelaide (5MMM)
- Mount Lofty; Australia
- Broadcast area: Adelaide
- Frequency: 104.7 MHz FM

Programming
- Language: English
- Format: Active rock
- Affiliations: Triple M

Ownership
- Owner: Southern Cross Austereo
- Sister stations: SAFM

History
- First air date: 25 March 1927 (as 5KA)
- Former call signs: 5KA (25 March 1927 – 31 December 1989); 5KKA (1 January 1990 – 31 December 1993)
- Former frequencies: 1200 kHz (1927–1978); 1197 kHz (1978–1990)

Technical information
- ERP: 20 kW; 2 kW (rerun)
- Repeater: 98.3 MHz FM (Adelaide Hills)

Links
- Website: www.triplem.com.au/adelaide

Triple M Adelaide (callsign 5MMM) is a radio station broadcasting in Adelaide, Australia. Its target demographic is the 30–54 age group. Triple M Adelaide is part of Southern Cross Austereo's Triple M network and broadcasts on the 104.7 MHz frequency.

Triple M Adelaide has in the past simply networked the majority of its shows from its Sydney and Melbourne counterpart stations, but since 2011 it has focused more on local content.

== History ==
Triple M Adelaide had its origins as an AM radio station, commencing broadcasting as 5KA on 25 March 1927 on the frequency 1200 kHz.

In 1941 the station and its repeater 5AU, along with interstate stations 2HD and 4AT, were closed by the federal government after allegations of fifth column activities. These stations were associated with the Jehovah's Witnesses, which opposed participation in the war, and had other doctrines seen as unpatriotic. In 1943 5KA was reopened after purchase by the Methodist Church, and became attached to the Central Methodist Mission, largely organised by Reverend Samuel Forsyth. The station was locally notable as the only broadcaster operating through the night. The station changed frequency to 1197 kHz in 1978, as part of the change in channel spacing from 10 to 9 kHz on the AM broadcast band.

In 1982, 5KA adopted a country music format and re-branded itself 12K. This format lasted only eight months.

In 1983, Adelaide's number one breakfast duo Bazz & Pilko defected from rival station 5AD, bringing much of their audience with them and giving 5KA a much needed ratings boost. Also in the mid 1980s, 5KA converted to AM stereo and adopted a younger music format "All hits all the time", resulting in improved ratings.

In July 1986, 5KA was sold to Wesgo and then in mid 1987 changed to a "hits and memories" format, followed in June 1988 by a move to brand-new studios at 106 Currie Street in the Adelaide central business district.

On 1 January 1990, 5KA became the first of two commercial AM radio stations in Adelaide to convert to the FM band. The station bid $5.5 million in a priced based allocation process the previous year for the FM licence. 5KA moved to the frequency 104.7 MHz and the AM frequency was relinquished. With the FM conversion, the 5KA call-sign was changed to 5KKA and the station was branded on-air as KAFM.

The AM frequency was re-purposed and allocated to a community broadcasting licence, 5RPH. The former transmission equipment which was co-located with competitor 5AD at the time was handed over to the operators contracted to provide transmission facilities to 5RPH, but the infrastructure was effectively abandoned.

In August 1993, Hoyts Media which owned the Triple M radio network in the eastern states bought KAFM but could not adopt the Triple M call-sign in Adelaide as a community radio station already had the call-sign 5MMM. Hoyts then paid 5MMM for the right to use the Triple M name. The community station 5MMM then converted to 5DDD, and KAFM was then free to change its call-sign to 5MMM and adopt the Triple M network brand, which was launched on 1 January 1994 with a contemporary hit radio format. With the merger of the Hoyts Triple M network into the Austereo Network, the station became a sister station to SAFM, and relocated to the ground floor of the building that was partly occupied by SAFM in 1995.

In 1996, the station adopted a classic rock format but then later moved to an active rock format comparable to similar formats on Triple M stations in the eastern states.

== Digital radio ==
Since 27 September 2014, Triple M has been simulcast on digital radio in Adelaide.

During AC/DC's 2010 Australian tour, Triple M aired High Voltage Radio, a "pop up" digital radio station that exclusively played AC/DC. High Voltage stopped being aired at the conclusion of the tour on 15 March 2010.
