= Austereo =

Australian mass media company

- Type: Public
- Traded as: ASX: AEO
- Industry: Broadcast media
- Founded: 1980; 46 years ago in Adelaide, Australia
- Founder: Paul Thompson
- Defunct: 21 July 2011
- Fate: Acquired by Southern Cross Media Group
- Successor: Southern Cross Austereo
- Headquarters: Melbourne, Australia
- Key people: Peter Harvie (Chairman); Guy Dobson (CEO); Kathy Gramp (CFO); Ross Forgione (CIO); Craig Bruce (Head of Content); Adam Lang (Director of Operations); Jeremy McVean (Head of Digital Strategy)
- Products: Today Network; Triple M; Barry; Radar
- Website: austereo.com.au

Austereo was an Australian mass media company based in Melbourne. It was founded in 1980 by Paul Thompson, and operated 16 radio stations in metropolitan and regional Australia under the Today Network and Triple M brands. In 2011, the company's majority shareholder Village Roadshow sold its shareholding to Southern Cross Media Group, which began trading as Southern Cross Austereo from 21 July.

== History ==
The company was founded by broadcaster Paul Thompson, who upon the commencement of FM broadcasting in Australia acquired the first commercial radio licence for the metropolitan Adelaide area. SAFM commenced transmission in September 1980, with the Austereo Network established in 1986 following the company's acquisition of Fox FM Melbourne.

In 1988, Austereo acquired FM104.7 and 2CA in Canberra as well as 4BK Brisbane and 6IX Perth. The company then bid to convert the BK and IX stations to the FM band. In Brisbane, the company was successful, relaunching 4BK as B105 FM in February 1990; in Perth, the company was outbid by 6KY and 6PM, and consequently sold the station to Radio West. In May 1989, the company extended its reach into Sydney with the acquisition of 2Day FM.

In 1995, Austereo purchased the Triple M network from Hoyts Media, adding a further five radio stations to the company's portfolio. The existing Austereo stations were rebranded to the Today Network. Subsequently, rival cinema chain Village Roadshow acquired control of Austereo, with Thompson departing as CEO.

On 22 January 1996, Austereo purchased KOFM and NXFM in Newcastle from Radio Newcastle Pty Ltd. Austereo would go on to sell 50% of its stake in these stations to RG Capital.

In March 1997 Austereo's managing director, Mr Peter Harvie, announced the network would be entering a joint venture with ARN to effectively amalgamate FM104.7 and Mix 106 in Canberra. Under competition laws, Austereo was required to sell 2CA, with Harvie commenting the station would be 'disposed of immediately'. At the time, Harvie stated that the deal was peculiar to the Canberra market and the company had 'no intention' of implementing similar ventures in other capitals.

In September 1997 the ACCC ruled in favour of Austereo's acquisition Perth's highest rating radio stations of PMFM and 94.5FM from Jack Bendat, selling Triple M Perth to Southern Cross Broadcasting. The ACCC required that the new owners of Triple M change the call sign, with Austereo retaining the right to rebrand either of its new stations to Triple M. This finally occurred when the 92.9 FM frequency (originally PMFM) was rebranded to Triple M Perth in December 2020.

Village Roadshow partially floated the company on the Australian Securities Exchange in 2001 under the ticker symbol AEO, increasing its share in the company to 61.8% in 2004. In January 2011, industry publication Radioinfo reported Village Roadshow were "in discussions" to sell its majority shareholding in Austereo. On 31 January, Southern Cross Media Group announced it had offered to purchase Village Roadshow's 52.5% shareholding for $741 million. The bid was approved by the Australian Competition & Consumer Commission on 18 March and formally accepted by Village Roadshow later that month.

On 6 April, Austereo shareholders accepted the takeover bid, and on 27 July Southern Cross Media Group commenced trading as Southern Cross Austereo, merging the Today and Triple M radio networks with the group's regional radio stations.

== Assets ==
=== Today Network ===
- 2Day FM
- 92.9
- B105
- Fox FM
- SAFM
- 104.7 (joint-venture with Australian Radio Network)
- NXFM (joint-venture with Southern Cross Media Group)

=== Triple M ===
- Triple M Sydney
- Triple M Melbourne
- Triple M Brisbane
- Triple M Adelaide
- Mix 94.5
- KOFM (joint-venture with Southern Cross Media Group)
- Mix 106.3 (joint-venture with Australian Radio Network)

=== Digital radio ===
- Barry
- Radar
- The Main Stage

Former

- Choose the Hits (2009–2010)
- High Voltage Radio (2010)
- Radio Gaga (2010)
- I See Red Radio (2010)
- Caravan Radio (2010)
- U20 (2010)

== See also ==
- Southern Cross Austereo
