= Sea FM 90.9 =

Sea FM 90.9 (4SEA)
- Gold Coast, Queensland; Australia
- Broadcast area: Gold Coast RA1 ()
- Frequency: 90.9 MHz FM
- Branding: Sea FM 90.9

Programming
- Language: English
- Format: Top 40 (CHR)
- Affiliations: Hit Network

Ownership
- Owner: Southern Cross Austereo; (Sea FM Gold Coast Pty Ltd)
- Sister stations: Triple M Gold Coast

History
- First air date: 19 March 1989

Technical information
- ERP: 25,000 watts
- HAAT: 406 m
- Transmitter coordinates: 27°58′11″S 153°12′48″E

Links
- Website: Sea FM 90.9 Gold Coast

Sea FM 90.9 (call sign: 4SEA) is a radio station on the Gold Coast in Queensland, Australia. It is part of Southern Cross Austereo's Hit Network, and is also the network hub for the regional Hit Stream, broadcasting shows at times from 9 am - 12 am across the Hit Networks across Australia.

== History ==
The Sea FM brand name and original logo was created by Gold Coast Broadcasters Pty Ltd for just the one station - 90.9 Sea FM - after the Gold Coast was granted a new commercial FM licence. 90.9 Sea FM began broadcasting in 1989 with programming consulted by Austereo. The original Sea FM on-air line-up was a strong team of experienced announcers, many having made their name previously in metropolitan radio including - Craig Bruce (Fox FM) & Sammy Power, Ian 'Lofty' Fulton (4IP), Grahame "Durry" Rodgers (2SM & 2NX), Sue Moses (Triple M Sydney & Network 10), Gregg Easton (2UW & 4BK), Joe Miller (3XY & Eon FM), Dean Miller and Simon Franks.

In November 2011, controversy erupted after rumours surfaced that popular long-term breakfast co-host, Moyra Major, was to be replaced by entertainer Charli Robinson, after Robinson had filled in for six weeks while Major was on maternity leave. It was reported that Major had been replaced due to a significant increase in ratings for the breakfast show during Robinson's stint as co-host. Robinson and her co-host Paul Gale were replaced by Heather Maltman, Dan Anstey and Ben Hannant on 5 December 2016.

On 15 December 2016 Sea FM Gold Coast became known as Hit 90.9 Sea FM in Southern Cross Austereo’s mass re-branding of its regional radio network. Along with Sea FM Central Coast they were able to retain their heritage name for the moment.

On 3 July 2018 Sea FM Gold Coast had dropped the word "Hit" out of its station name "Hit 90.9 Sea FM", reverting to its original name "90.9 Sea FM", as well as its sister station 101.3 Sea FM on the Central Coast of New South Wales.

On 12 July 2019, SCA’s Hit Network announced the Gold Coast’s Sea FM would rebrand becoming Hit90.9 from 29 July 2019. The rebrand came with a new Breakfast show with Dan Anstey and Ben Hannant joined by Lise Carlaw and Sarah Wills.

In July 2020, Carlaw and Wills resigned and it was later announced that Bianca Dye would join the team with the show titled Bianca, Dan & Ben. In August 2021, it was rebranded back to Sea FM.

In June 2022, Anstey resigned to join Triple M Brisbane's Big Breakfast with Marto, Margaux and Dan Anstey.
