= List of Sydney radio stations =

Radio in Sydney became a popular tool for politics, news, religion, and sport and has managed to survive despite the introduction of television and the internet. The first long range (520 km) coastal radio station was established in 1911. In 1921, amateur radio broadcasters commenced transition. The first radio licence in Australia was granted to Charles Maclurcan for station 2CM. Commencing in 1923, 2SB is the second official station to be licensed. Sydney's first official station 2FC commenced service in 1924. In 1935, the studios of the ABC install a disc recorder, enabling the recording of programs to occur for the first time. Talk radio was introduced on 2SM in 1967. In 1974, 2MBS commences broadcasting as the first full-time FM station in Australia, playing classical music 24 hours a day. Finally, in 1975, multicultural radio is launched with the formation of 2EA.

== Notes ==
- Historically, many Australian broadcast stations had no names other than their official callsigns. In this case the Station name is left blank.
- Other stations have had several names. These names are all listed.
- If the station is still broadcasting under the same callsign and mode of transmission, the Last broadcast is left blank.
- If the callsign and/or mode of transmission has changed, the new data is presented on a new row of the table, and the name or callsign of the new station is shown in the Succeeded by column, which is otherwise blank.
- Sydney radio stations are surveyed 8 times per year by Commercial Radio Australia as part of the national radio ratings surveys.

== Stations ==
AM and FM stations with an asterisk are also available on digital (DAB+) radio

=== AM ===
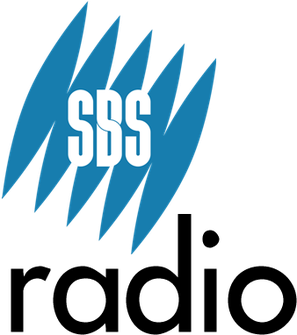
SBS Radio targets the Sydneysiders who speak a language other than English at home with programs in 74 languages.

Callsign	Location	Frequency (kHz)	Branding	Format	Type	Launch
2RN	Sydney	576	ABC Radio National	Talk	National	5 December 1923
2PB	Sydney	630	ABC News Radio	News/Talk	National	15 August 1994
2BL	Sydney	702	ABC Radio Sydney	Talk	National	23 November 1923
2GB	Sydney	873	2GB	News/Talk	Commercial	23 August 1926
2UE	Sydney	954	2UE	Easy listening/Oldies	Commercial	26 January 1925
2KY	Sydney	1017	Sky Sports Radio	Sports	Commercial	31 October 1925
2EA	Sydney	1107	SBS Radio	Multicultural	National	9 June 1975
2CH	Sydney	1170	SEN	Sports	Commercial	22 October 2020
2SM	Sydney	1269	2SM	News/Talk	Commercial	24 December 1931
2RPH	Sydney	1224	2RPH Print Radio	Radio Reading Service	Community	18 April 1983
	Sydney	1539	SEN Track	Sport	Commercial	October 2020
	Sydney	1611	Vision Radio Network	Christian	Narrowcast	1 February 1999
	Sydney	1620	2moro Radio	Arabic	Narrowcast	February 2006
	Sydney	1638	2ME Radio Arabic	Arabic/Classic Hits/Pop Contemporary	Narrowcast	25 October 1996
	Sydney	1665	2MM Greek Radio	Greek	Narrowcast	1996
	Sydney	1683	Greek Radio	Greek	Narrowcast	16th of March 1983

=== FM ===
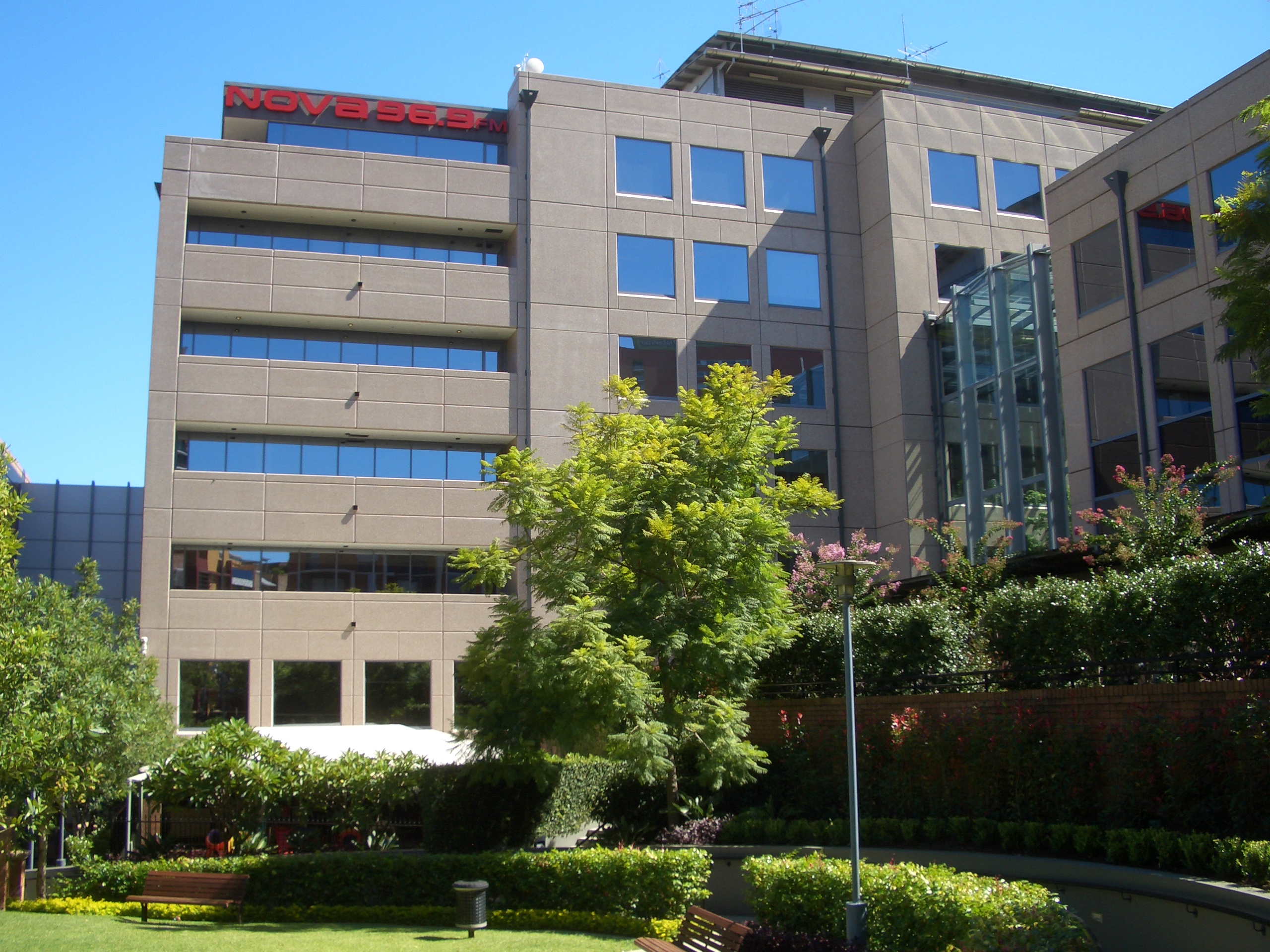
Nova 96.9 was the most listened to station in Sydney in 2016 with 944,000 listeners (Nova studios in Pyrmont).

Callsign	Location	Frequency (MHz)	Branding	Format	Type	Launch
2ABCFM	Sydney	92.9	ABC Classic*	Classical	National	24 January 1976
2SBSFM	Sydney	97.7	SBS Radio*	Multicultural	National	9 June 1975
2JJJ	Sydney	105.7	Triple J*	Youth	National	19 January 1975
2MAC	Campbelltown	91.3	C91.3	Hot Adult Contemporary	Commercial	2001
2PTV	Sydney	95.3	Smooth FM 95.3*	Adult Contemporary	Commercial	1 August 2005
2ONE	Katoomba	96.1	CADA*	Rhythmic Contemporary Hip Hop	Commercial	7 September 1935 (as 2KA); 23 October 1992 (as One FM) January 2002 as The Edge 96.ONE 30 March 2022 as CADA
2SYD	Sydney	96.9	Nova 96.9*	Pop Contemporary Hit Radio	Commercial	1 April 2001
2UUS	Sydney	101.7	Gold 101.7*	Classic Hits	Commercial	23 November 1978
2DAY	Sydney	104.1	2Day FM*	Pop Contemporary Hit Radio	Commercial	2 August 1980
2MMM	Sydney	104.9	Triple M 104.9*	Rock	Commercial	2 August 1980
2WFM	Sydney	106.5	KIIS 1065*	Pop Contemporary Hit Radio	Commercial	13 February 1925 (as 2UW); 30 April 1994 (as Mix 106.5); 19 January 2014 (as KIIS 106.5)
2RDJ	Burwood, New South Wales	88.1	2RDJ	Community Radio	Community	5 November 1983
2RRR	Ryde	88.5	2RRR	Community Radio	Community	1984
2MWM	Manly North	88.7	Radio Northern Beaches	Community Radio	Community	March 1984
2RSR	Sydney	88.9	Radio Skid Row	Community Radio	Community	10 August 1983
2GLF	Liverpool	89.3	89.3 2GLF	Community Radio	Community	1985
2RES	Waverley	89.7	Eastside Radio	Community Radio	Community	1983
2VTR	Windsor	89.9	Hawkesbury Radio	Community Radio	Community	1978
2NBC	Narwee	90.1	2NBC Radio	Community Radio	Community	May 1983
2CCR	Parramatta	90.5	Alive 90.5	Community Radio	Community	18 December 1992
2MFM	Sydney	92.1	Muslim Community Radio*	Muslim Community Radio	Community	1995
2LND	Sydney	93.7	Koori Radio*	Indigenous programming	Community	December 2002
2FBI	Sydney	94.5	FBi Radio*	Australian Music	Community	29 August 2003
2OOO	Sydney	98.5	2000 FM	Multilingual	Community	1994
2NSB	Chatswood	99.3	Northside Radio	Community Radio	Community	May 1983
2SSR	Sutherland	99.7	2SSR	Community Radio	Community	26 September 1992
2SWR	Blacktown	99.9	SWR FM	Community Radio	Community	27 September 2003
2HHH	Hornsby	100.1	Triple H 100.1	Community Radio	Community	2000
2MCR	Campbelltown	100.3	2MCR	Community Radio	Community	22 August 1989
2RPH	Sydney East	100.5	RPH Print Radio	Radio Reading Service	Community	18 April 1983
2WOW	Penrith	100.7	Wow FM	Community Radio	Community	June 2001
2BAC	Padstow, New South Wales	100.9	Connect FM 100.9	Community Radio	Community	1983
2MBS	Sydney	102.5	Fine Music Sydney*	Classical/Jazz/Blues	Community	15 December 1974
2CBA	Sydney	103.2	Hope 103.2	Contemporary Christian	Community	5 March 1979
2SER	Sydney	107.3	2SER*	Community Radio	Community	1 October 1979
	Sydney	87.6	Mood FM		Narrowcast	
	Brookvale	87.6	Raw FM	Dance	Narrowcast	December 1999
	Penrith / Campbelltown / Hawkesbury	88.0	Faith FM	Religious	Narrowcast	1 January 2021
	Penrith / Camden	87.8 / 88.7	Vintage FM	Oldies	Narrowcast	1 January 2009
	Hawkesbury / Penrith / Blue Mountains	87.6	River FM 876	Country	Narrowcast	1993
	Sydney	87.8	Radio Austral	Spanish	Narrowcast	27 June 1992
	Ultimo	87.8	AC 878	Chinese	Narrowcast	25 February 2025
	Bondi	88.0	Bondi FM		Narrowcast	

=== Digital radio ===
Digital radio in Australia uses the DAB+ standard and is available in Sydney, Melbourne, Brisbane, Perth, Adelaide, Canberra and Darwin. The national government owned networks, the ABC and SBS, and the commercial radio stations in each market provide many of their services and a few digital-only services on the digital platform. Australia uses the AAC+ codec provided with upgraded DAB+ standard.

Type	Short Label	Branding	Format	Bit-Rate	Ensemble
Audio	ABC NEWS	ABC NEWS	News	40 kbit/s	SY ABC&sbs RADIO
Audio	Double J	Double J	Other Music	72 kbit/s	SY ABC&sbs RADIO
Audio	ABC Jazz	ABC Jazz	Jazz Music	88 kbit/s	SY ABC&sbs RADIO
Audio	ABCCntry	ABC Country	Country Music	72 kbit/s	SY ABC&sbs RADIO
Audio	ABC KIDS	ABC KIDS listen	Varied	64 kbit/s	SY ABC&sbs RADIO
Audio	ABC SYD	ABC SYDNEY	News	64 kbit/s	SY ABC&sbs RADIO
Audio	ABCRN	ABCRadioNational	Current Affairs	64 kbit/s	SY ABC&sbs RADIO
Audio	ABC Clas	ABC Classic	Serious Classical	120 kbit/s	SY ABC&sbs RADIO
Audio	ABCSport	ABC Grandstand	Sport	40 kbit/s	SY ABC&sbs RADIO
Audio	triple j	Triple J	Pop Music	72 kbit/s	SY ABC&sbs RADIO
Audio	Unearth	Triple J Unearthed	Other Music	72 kbit/s	SY ABC&sbs RADIO
Audio	SBS 1	SBS Radio 1	National Music	40 kbit/s	SY ABC&sbs RADIO
Audio	SBS 2	SBS Radio 2	National Music	40 kbit/s	SY ABC&sbs RADIO
Audio	SBS 3	SBS Radio 3	National Music	48 kbit/s	SY ABC&sbs RADIO
Audio	Chill	SBS Chill	National Music	72 kbit/s	SY ABC&sbs RADIO
Audio	PopAsia	SBS PopAsia	National Music	72 kbit/s	SY ABC&sbs RADIO
Audio	South Asian	SBS South Asian	National Music	64 kbit/s	SY ABC&sbs RADIO
Audio	Arabic	SBS Arabic	News	48 kbit/s	SY ABC&sbs RADIO
Data	ABC EPG	ABC-SBS EPG	-	8 kbit/s	SY ABC&sbs RADIO
Audio	2SM	2SM Talk & Sport	News	64 kbit/s	DAB+ Sydney 1
Audio	Gorilla	GorillaDanceHits	Dance	48 kbit/s	DAB+ Sydney 1
Audio	ZOO	ZOO MusicVariety	Pop Music	48 kbit/s	DAB+ Sydney 1
Audio	Dance	Dance Super Digi	Pop Music	48 kbit/s	DAB+ Sydney 1
Audio	FUN	FUN Classic Hits	Classic Hits	48 kbit/s	DAB+ Sydney 1
Audio	Triple M	Triple M	Rock Music	56 kbit/s	DAB+ Sydney 1
Audio	MMM104.9	MMM104.9 TRIPLEM	Rock Music	56 kbit/s	DAB+ Sydney 1
Audio	MMMCLASS	MMM CLASSIC ROCK	Rock Music	48 kbit/s	DAB+ Sydney 1
Audio	MMMGREAT	MMM GREATEST	Rock Music	40 kbit/s	DAB+ Sydney 1
Audio	MMMAUS	MMM AUSSIE	Rock Music	40 kbit/s	DAB+ Sydney 1
Audio	2DayFM	2DayFM	Pop Music	56 kbit/s	DAB+ Sydney 1
Audio	2DayEasy	2Day Easy	Pop Music	40 kbit/s	DAB+ Sydney 1
Audio	2DayBudd	2Day Buddha	Chill Music	40 kbit/s	DAB+ Sydney 1
Audio	2DayOlds	2Day Oldskool	Pop Music	40 kbit/s	DAB+ Sydney 1
Audio	2DayUrba	2Day Urban	Pop Music	48 kbit/s	DAB+ Sydney 1
Audio	2UE	2UE	Music	80 kbit/s	DAB+ Sydney 1
Audio	NTS	News Talk Sport	Sport	32 kbit/s	DAB+ Sydney 1
Audio	SkySprt1	SkySportsRadio1	Racing	64 kbit/s	DAB+ Sydney 1
Audio	SkySprt2	SkySportsRadio2	Racing	32 kbit/s	DAB+ Sydney 1
Audio	SkyTbred	Sky Tbred Cent	Racing	32 kbit/s	DAB+ Sydney 1
Audio	Fine Mus	Fine Music	Serious Classical	64 kbit/s	DAB+ Sydney 1
Audio	Koori	Koori Radio	Culture	48 kbit/s	DAB+ Sydney 1
Audio	2RPH	2RPH Digital	Information	64 kbit/s	DAB+ Sydney 1
Audio	2TripleO	2TripleO 985	Culture	64 kbit/s	DAB+ Sydney 1
Audio	WSFM1017	Gold 101.7	Classic Hits	48 kbit/s	DAB+ Sydney 2
Audio	WSFM 80s	WSFM 80s	Classic Hits	32 kbit/s	DAB+ Sydney 2
Audio	KIIS1065	KIIS 1065	Pop Music	48 kbit/s	DAB+ Sydney 2
Audio	The Edge	The Edge	Pop Music	32 kbit/s	DAB+ Sydney 2
Audio	KIIS 90s	KIIS 90s	Pop Music	32 kbit/s	DAB+ Sydney 2
Audio	CW Remix	CW Remix	Pop Music	32 kbit/s	DAB+ Sydney 2
Audio	ELFRadio	ELF Radio	Christmas Music	32 kbit/s	DAB+ Sydney 2
Audio	Kids	Kinderling Kids	Children's Programmes	32 kbit/s	DAB+ Sydney 2
Audio	smoothfm	smooth fm 95.3	Easy Listening Music	64 kbit/s	DAB+ Sydney 2
Audio	Relax	Smooth Relax	Chill Music	40 kbit/s	DAB+ Sydney 2
Audio	Nova 969	Nova 969	Pop Music	112 kbit/s	DAB+ Sydney 2
Audio	Coles	Coles Radio	Pop Music	40 kbit/s	DAB+ Sydney 2
Audio	2GB	2GB 873	News	128 kbit/s	DAB+ Sydney 2
Audio	2CH 1170	2CH 1170	Oldies Music	128 kbit/s	DAB+ Sydney 2
Audio	MMMCNTRY	MMM COUNTRY	Country Music	48 kbit/s	DAB+ Sydney 2
Audio	Hope	Hope 1032	Other Music	48 kbit/s	DAB+ Sydney 2
Audio	InspireD	Inspire Digital	Religion	48 kbit/s	DAB+ Sydney 2
Audio	2SER	2SER 107.3	Education	64 kbit/s	DAB+ Sydney 2
Audio	2MFM	2MFM Muslim DR	Religion	48 kbit/s	DAB+ Sydney 2
Audio	FBi	FBi Radio	Other Music	56 kbit/s	DAB+ Sydney 2

== See also ==
- List of radio stations in Australia
- Culture of Sydney
- Music of Australia
- History of broadcasting in Australia
