= Media in Sydney =

Sydney is often referred to as Australia's "media capital" since it completely dominates the media market in Australia. Most Australian media companies and all major television networks are headquartered in Sydney. The book publishing industry in Sydney is also very large. Also, many of Australia's broadcasting companies have head offices in Sydney. Sydney is also home to Australia's film industry, with major production companies based in and around the Sydney CBD. Disney Studios Australia is located in Sydney, in the inner city suburb of Moore Park.

== Newspapers ==
Sydney has two main daily newspapers. The Sydney Morning Herald (which is the oldest Australian newspaper) is Sydney's newspaper of record with extensive coverage of domestic and international news, culture and business. It is also the oldest extant newspaper in Australia, having been published regularly since 1831. The Herald's competitor, The Daily Telegraph, is a News Corporation-owned tabloid. Both papers have tabloid counterparts published on Sunday, The Sun-Herald and the Sunday Telegraph respectively. The Australian and Australian Financial Review are also based in Sydney, but are considered national papers.

Smith's Weekly was published in Sydney but circulated around Australia. It ran from 1919 to 1950.

== Television ==
Sydney has five television networks. The three commercial television networks (Seven, Nine and 10), the national government network (ABC) and the multi-cultural provider (SBS). Each network has provided additional channels on the Freeview digital network. These include 10 Drama, 10 Comedy, Nickelodeon, Gecko, ABC HD, ABC Family/ABC Kids, ABC Entertains, ABC News, SBS HD (SBS broadcast in HD), SBS2, SBS2 HD (SBS2 broadcast in HD), SBS World Movies, SBS Food, NITV, SBS WorldWatch, 7HD (Seven broadcast in HD), 7two, 7mate, 7flix, 7mate HD (7mate broadcast in HD), 7Bravo, TVSN, Racing.com, 9HD (Nine broadcast in HD), 9Gem, 9Go!, 9Life, 9Gem HD (9Gem broadcast in HD), 9Rush and Extra. All networks have their headquarters located in Sydney. Pay TV, for example, Foxtel and Optus are also all headquartered in Sydney. Historically, the networks have been based on the north shore, but the last decade has seen several move to the inner city. Nine have their headquarters and studios north of the harbour, in North Sydney (it was moved from Willoughby). 10 have their headquarters and studios in a redeveloped section of the inner-city suburb of Pyrmont (it was moved from North Ryde, then Ultimo), and Seven have their headquarters and studios in Eveleigh (it was moved from Epping, then Martin Place). The ABC have their headquarters and studios in the suburb of Ultimo and Parramatta (it was moved from Artarmon) and SBS have their headquarters and studios at Artarmon. Foxtel and Optus both supply pay-TV over their cable services or via satellite to most parts of the urban area.

== Film ==
Sydney is Australia’s centre for film and media. Many of the landmarks in Sydney have been referenced, shown and have been the settings for countless films and television programs. Sydney also has a wide number of references in films that have been set in the city, the most famous being in the 2003 Disney/Pixar animated film Finding Nemo, which was set in the famous Sydney Harbour. The emerging suburb of Parramatta in Sydney, recently played host to Owen Wilson and Kate Hudson film premiere You, Me and Dupree. All films premiere in Sydney and only in very few cases in other Australian cities. Film in Sydney has been criticized for attracting major and international productions only and neglecting local productions, which are usually filmed in other Australian cities. Compared to other Australian cities, Sydney's film industry is highly commercial and only Gold Coast has a commercial film industry slightly similar to Sydney's.

== Radio ==
For 2020, the Nielsen Company estimates the Sydney radio market has 3,983,000 listeners. Many AM and FM government, commercial and community radio services broadcast in the Sydney area. The local ABC radio station is ABC Radio Sydney. The talkback radio genre is dominated by the perennial rivals 2GB and 2SM. Popular music stations include KIIS 106.5, Triple M, 2Day FM, and Nova 96.9, which generally targets people under 40. In the older end of the music radio market, Smooth 95.3 and Hope 103.2 target the 25 to 45 age group, while Gold 101.7 targets the 40 to 54 age group with their Classic Hits format mostly focussing on the 70's & 80's. 2UE targets the over 55's. There are also some radio stations dedicated to sports broadcasting. One of these is SEN 1170, which took over 2CH's old radio licence and replaced it with a 24-hour sports format. Sky Sports Radio 1017 (formerly known as 2KY) and SEN Track 1539 covers all sports but they both specialise in the coverage of Horse Racing, Harness Racing and Greyhounds. Triple J, 2SER and FBi Radio provide a more independent, local and alternative sound. A number of community stations broadcast to a particular language group or local area such as 2ME, 2MM, Rete Italia, Radio Austral, Koori Radio and Radio Brisvaani.

== See also ==
- Television broadcasting in Australia
- List of Sydney radio stations
- List of films set in Sydney
- Newspapers in Australia
