= AM expanded band =

Broadcast stations between 1600 and 1700 kHz

ITU regions and the dividing lines between them. Region 1 Region 2 Region 3

The extended mediumwave broadcast band, commonly known as the AM expanded band, refers to the broadcast station frequency assignments immediately above the earlier upper limits of 1600 kHz in International Telecommunication Union (ITU) Region 2 (the Americas), and 1602 kHz in ITU Regions 1 (Europe, northern Asia, and Africa) and 3 (southern Asia and Oceania).

In Region 2, this consists of 10 additional frequencies, spaced 10 kHz apart, and running from 1610 kHz to 1700 kHz. In Regions 1 and 3, where frequency assignments are spaced 9 kHz apart, the result is 11 additional frequencies, from 1611 kHz to 1701 kHz.

== ITU Region 1 ==
ITU Region
1 & 3 (9 kHz spacing)	2 (10 kHz spacing)
1611	1610
1620	1620
1629	1630
1638	1640
1647	1650
1656	1660
1665	1670
1674	1680
1683	1690
1692	1700
1701	1710 (Note: 1710 kHz is outside of the official allocation, and is used by just a handful of stations)
1710	

=== Europe ===
The extended band is not officially allocated in Europe, and the trend of national broadcasters in the region has been to reduce the number of their AM band stations in favor of FM and digital transmissions. However, new Low-Power AM (LPAM) stations have recently come on the air from countries like Finland, Sweden, Norway, Denmark, the Netherlands, and Italy. These frequencies are also used by a number of "hobby" pirate radio stations, particularly in the Netherlands, Greece, and Serbia. Vatican Radio for many years transmitted on 1611 kHz, before ceasing broadcasts on this frequency in 2012. Since 2014, a licensed Norwegian project has been broadcasting both Radio Northern Star and The Sea on 1611 kHz.

== ITU Region 2 ==
In 1979, a World Administrative Radio Conference (WARC-79) adopted "Radio Regulation No. 480", which stated that "In Region 2, the use of the band 1605-1705 kHz by stations of the broadcasting service shall be subject to a plan to be established by a regional administrative radio conference..." As a consequence, on June 8, 1988, an ITU-sponsored conference held at Rio de Janeiro, Brazil, adopted provisions, effective July 1, 1990, to extend the upper end of the Region 2 AM broadcast band, by adding 10 frequencies which spanned from 1610 kHz to 1700 kHz. The agreement provided for a standard transmitter power of 1 kilowatt, which could be increased to 10 kilowatts in cases where it did not result in undue interference.

=== Anguilla ===
Even before the formal adoption of the expansion, a 50,000-watt religious station located on the island of Anguilla, British West Indies, was broadcasting on 1610 kHz as "The Caribbean Beacon". This station dated to the early 1980s, and is no longer on the air.

=== Argentina ===
In Argentina, the expanded band assignments are primarily in the region surrounding the nation's capital, Buenos Aires.

=== Canada ===
Canada has made an informal agreement with the United States to allow Canadian stations operating on 1610, 1630, 1650, 1670, and 1690 kHz to be located closer to their common border than would normally be allowed, in exchange for allowing the U.S. the same privilege on the other frequencies. Therefore, all of its limited number of expanded band stations currently operate on these frequencies.

=== Cuba ===
There have only been a few expanded band stations established in Cuba. The most commonly used frequency is 1620 kHz, where multiple stations simulcast Radio Rebelde network programming.

=== Mexico ===
Mexico has a total of 4 radio stations licensed for the expanded band prior to 2017: XEUT-AM 1630, XEARZ-AM 1650, XEANAH-AM 1670, and XEPE-AM 1700. Both XEARZ (5 kW) and XEPE (10 kW) operate with nighttime power greater than 1 kW. These stations were authorized before changes in 2014 set aside the AM expanded band, along with 106-108 MHz on FM, for social community and social indigenous radio stations.

With the exception of XEFCR-AM in Reynosa, Tamaulipas, all of the stations since assigned to the expanded band have been community or indigenous stations: XECSCA-AM, XECSCGU-AM, XECSIA-AM, XECSIB-AM, and XECSIC-AM.

=== United States ===
==== Background ====
In the United States, implementation of the North American Regional Broadcasting Agreement in 1941 by the Federal Communications Commission (FCC) had established 1600 kHz as the upper limit for the standard AM broadcast band. Beginning in the 1930s, adjacent higher frequencies had commonly been designated as a police radio band. Even after police radio transmissions were no longer made on this band, some county and city ordinances still forbade receivers capable of picking up transmissions on these frequencies, and they had reportedly been occasionally enforced to cite motorists in possession of amateur radio gear, or in extreme cases an AM radio installed in the vehicle as original equipment.

A small group of frequencies, starting at 1665 kHz, had been set aside for use by cordless telephones, however in 1983, a higher allocation was assigned, and production of handsets transmitting on the lower frequencies was prohibited after October 1, 1984. Therefore, by 1988, the frequencies from 1610 to 1700 kHz were largely unoccupied, with one major exception: 1610 kHz was one of two primary frequencies (along with 530 kHz) that had been assigned for use by hundreds of low-powered Travelers Information Stations (TIS). Moreover, the controlling licensing authority for these stations was not the FCC, but instead was the National Telecommunications and Information Administration (NTIA), so coordination between the two agencies was required. It was concluded that, for operation on 1610 kHz, TIS and broadcasting stations were considered "co-primary" services, thus existing TIS stations were protected from having to move to new frequencies. The restriction imposed by having to protect existing TIS stations on 1610 kHz generally reduced by one the number of available expanded band frequencies, and because the sole U.S assignment for this frequency, KALT in Atlanta, Texas, was eventually deleted; currently there are no broadcasting stations licensed for 1610 kHz in the United States.

The FCC gave approval for TIS stations to operate on 1620–1700, on a secondary basis, and it was informally suggested that, once most radios could tune to the higher frequencies, all of the TIS stations on 1610 kHz could be moved as a group to 1710 kHz, however this was never implemented. (Currently 1710 kHz is unused by TIS stations with one exception: a waiver has been granted to Hudson County, New Jersey, to operate a single-frequency network (WQFG689)).

==== Preparation ====
When the ITU approved the extension of the "top end" of the AM band to 1700 kHz in 1988, few consumer radios could tune higher than about 1620 or 1630 kHz. However, it was reported at the time that FCC "officials have been meeting with American manufacturers of radio receivers to make an early start on producing sets capable of receiving signals in the new band..." and when the first U.S. expanded band radio station began operating in late 1995, it was estimated that by now there were 280 million radios capable of receiving the full expanded band.

During the 1988 ITU conference, it was suggested that as many as 500 U.S. stations could be assigned to the new frequencies. On April 12, 1990, the Federal Communications Commission (FCC) voted to begin the process of populating the expanded band. Although some individuals had hoped the commission would give preferences to minority-owner or daytime-only stations, it announced that the main priority would be reducing interference on the existing AM band, by transferring selected stations to the new frequencies. It was now estimated that the expanded band could accommodate around 300 U.S. stations.

The president of WJDM in Elizabeth City, New Jersey, John R. Quinn, was frustrated that the station was limited to daytime-only operation, and required to sign-off at night, because it was located within protected nighttime coverage area of a Class I "clear channel" station, WCKY in Cincinnati, Ohio. In addition, there were no unused fulltime assignments available on the AM and FM bands in the congested New York City region. Quinn saw this as an opportunity for WJDM to move to a new frequency allowing fulltime operation. It was arranged for congressional representative Matthew J. Rinaldo to introduce legislation that added a carefully worded provision to the Communications Act of 1934 in late 1991, mandating that "It shall be the policy of the Federal Communications Commission, in any case in which the licensee of an existing AM daytime-only station located in a community with a population of more than 100,000 persons that lacks a local full-time aural station licensed to that community and that is located within a Class I station primary service area notifies the Commission that such licensee seeks to provide full-time service".

This addition successfully advanced WJDM's status, and on December 8, 1995 the station began broadcasting on the additional frequency of 1660 kHz, as the country's first with regular broadcasting on the expanded band. The wording inserted into the Communications Act was broad enough to qualify a second station, KXBT on 1190 kHz in Vallejo, California, for an expediated assignment, which debuted at 1640 kHz on March 19, 1996.

The common FCC practice for station applications on the standard AM frequencies is to process the applications individually. For the expanded band, the Commission decided to finish allocating the entire band at once on a nationwide basis, after evaluating all of the stations which notified the FCC that they were interested in moving to the new band. Faced with the difficult task of evaluating hundreds of applications, the FCC developed a multi-factored algorithm to rank the applicants. In addition to required separation standards, both within the United States and internationally, a major component of the evaluation was an individual station's "interference improvement factor", which was the degree to which a move to the expanded band would decrease the amount of interference on its vacated frequency, especially at night. The FCC summarized its primary considerations as "fulltime operation with stereo, competitive technical quality, 10 kW daytime power, 1 kW nighttime power, non-directional antenna (or simple directional) and 400-800 km spacing between co-channel stations".

There was an outstanding question about the number of stations, based on the proposed standards, that could be accommodated on the new frequencies, with the FCC noting that an engineering firm, Cohen, Dippell and Everist, had "submitted an analysis to demonstrate that instead of 25 to 30 stations per channel... their calculations show 'approximately 5 (certainly less than 10)' stations can be assigned per channel".

==== Implementation ====
In the fall of 1994, the FCC announced that, out of 688 applicants, a specially designed computer program (which took two weeks to run) had chosen 79 stations to make the transfer to the expanded band. However, a year later, the Commission rescinded these assignments, after it was determined that there had been major flaws in the data used to evaluate the applications. On March 22, 1996, the FCC announced a revised allocation table, consisting of 87 stations, but this too was eventually withdrawn due to errors. A third, and final, allocation, now approving 88 stations, was announced on March 17, 1997.

In order to ease the transition, the FCC provided that both the original station and its expanded band twin could optionally operate simultaneously for up to 5 years, after which owners would have to turn in one of the two licenses, depending on whether they preferred the new assignment or elected to remain on the original frequency. The FCC originally assumed that the expanded band stations would simulcast the programming of the original standard band stations, and be licensed to the same community. However, in most cases, the expanded band stations have run separate programming, and a few have moved to other communities. One policy the FCC has generally enforced is that the two stations must remain under common ownership, although an exception was made in the case of KYHN in Fort Smith, Arkansas, when the FCC approved its separate ownership, on the grounds that "Capstar's donation of the facility to MMTC, which planned to use KYHN to train women and minority group members in broadcasting and broadcast management, advanced the diversity goals set forth in the pending proceeding Promoting Diversification of Ownership in the Broadcasting Services".

WJDM (now WWRU in Jersey City, New Jersey), and KXBT (now KDIA, 1640 kHz in Vallejo, California), are the only expanded band stations in the United States authorized to use 10 kW at night. Other U.S. stations generally use 10 kilowatts during the day and one kilowatt at night, with non-directional antennas. An exception exists for stations that use antennas with higher than normal efficiency or those multiplexed with an existing station on a different frequency. KVNS in Brownsville, Texas, operates at 12% less than the standard (8.8 kW day and 880 watts at night) due to treaty obligations with Mexico, and WIGT in Charlotte Amalie, U.S. Virgin Islands, is licensed for 920 watts both day and night, due to similar treaty restrictions with respect to France's territorial holdings of Martinique and Guadeloupe.

In general, the FCC has refused to consider assigning any stations to the expanded band which were not included in the approval list adopted March 17, 1997. In 2006, an exception was made to this policy for WRCR in Ramapo, New York, which was allowed to move from 1300 to 1700 kHz, with the FCC stating that a "waiver is warranted to permit the licensing of a station that could provide full-time local emergency radio service to Rockland County residents who would be at great risk in the event of a radiological emergency at the Indian Point facility".

==== Later activities ====
A 2006 accounting by Radio World reported that, out of 4,758 licensed U.S. AM stations, 56 were now operating on the expanded band. The expanded band frequencies have also become popular for use by hobbyist microbroadcasting transmissions (which don't require licenses) due to the relatively limited number of broadcasting stations compared to the more congested standard/legacy AM band.

Despite the initial requirement that one of the two paired stations had to cease broadcasting by the end of a 5-year period, as of 2015, there were 25 cases where co-owned standard band and expanded band stations were still active, some of which were approaching 20 years of operation. However, at this time the FCC expressed its intention to eventually eliminate the practice, stating: "We therefore tentatively conclude that any licensee with dual standard/Expanded Band authorizations... should be required to surrender one of the two authorizations within one year of release of a future Report and Order in this proceeding adopting this proposal..." This report also noted that "A total of 88 Expanded Band channels were originally allotted. There were 67 applications filed for Expanded Band allotments, of which 66 construction permits were granted, with one application still pending. [On March 11, 2025, the 1997 application for 1620 kHz in Toms River, New Jersey, which was the only one which had not been acted on and was technically still pending, was cancelled by the FCC.] Licenses were granted to 54 stations that migrated from the standard AM band to the Expanded Band. Of those, 22 unconditionally surrendered their standard band licenses and remained in the Expanded Band; three conditionally surrendered their standard band licenses, and four standard band licenses were canceled by the Commission. The Commission also received one unconditional surrender of an Expanded Band authorization and one conditional surrender, and it canceled one Expanded Band license."

In 2021, the FCC announced plans for an auction of new station assignments, which included replacing four AM stations recently deleted in the St. Louis, Missouri, area. A suggestion to also include "abandoned AM expanded band facilities that were approved but never built" was denied. A 2022 FCC filing by Inspiration Media, Inc. characterized "the three decade-old expanded band plan" as so far providing only "exceedingly modest band-improvement". On July 9, 2025, four "Dual Band Stations" licensees made a filing with the FCC asking for policy clarification, and suggesting eliminating the requirement that one of the paired stations had to eventually be shut down.

== ITU Region 3 ==
=== Australia ===
Within Australia, the standard AM band transmitting frequencies of 531 to 1602 kHz are designated as the Broadcasting Services Band (BSB), while 1611 to 1701 kHz is designated as the "Mid-Frequency" band. A limited number of stations operate under commercial licences on 1611, 1620, and 1629 kHz. The 1992 Broadcasting Services Act introduced "narrowband" station classifications, for broadcasts targeting specialized non-general audiences, primarily in the larger cities, and a majority of stations assigned from 1611 to 1701 kHz are low-powered (400 watts or less) Narrowband Area Service stations (MF-NAS).

=== Japan ===
The AM expanded band in Japan extends to 1629 kHz. 1620 kHz and 1629 kHz are normally used by Highway advisory radio and/or Roadside Stations along stretches of major expressways. Many Japanese AM radios, car stereos, and other receivers (walkman, etc.) can tune up to 1629 kHz. 1611 kHz is rarely used in Japan.

=== The Philippines ===
In the Philippines, the first AM expanded band radio station in low power format broadcasting in Marikina is DZBF, "Radyo Marikina 1674", started on July 25, 1996.
