= Monday Night Football on Triple M =

Live NRL radio broadcast

- Genre: Sport (rugby league)
- Running time: 2+ hours
- Country of origin: Australia
- Language: English
- Home station: Triple M Sydney
- Syndicates: Triple M Brisbane, Triple M Melbourne and over 20 affiliates
- Hosted by: Dan Ginnane; Peter Sterling; Andrew Johns
- Original release: 2007 – 2016
- Audio format: Stereo
- Website: www.triplem.com.au/sydney/sport/nrl/monday-night-football
- Podcast: The Verdict

Monday Night Football on Triple M broadcasts each Monday night NRL game, ever since its most recent inception in 2007.

Austereo recently extended its deal to continue broadcasting rugby league until the conclusion of the 2012 season.

The rights are commercially exclusive, however ABC Radio broadcast Monday Night matches involving non-Sydney teams, permitted to be broadcast only into the regional markets of the appropriate team/s involved.

Triple M also ventured into international Rugby League, acquiring the rights to the 2010 Rugby League Four Nations tournament.

The broadcasts largely ceased in 2016 when Monday night games were removed from the competition's fixture; only two Monday games are played each year on Easter Monday and the King's Birthday public holiday.

However, Triple M does continue to broadcast NRL games.

== Current team ==
- Dan Ginnane (2007-)
- Peter Sterling (2010-)
- Andrew Johns (2010-)
- Steve Mascord

== Former members ==
- Anthony Maroon (2007–08)
- Mark Geyer (2007)
- Kevin Walters (2007–08)
- Phil Gould (2008–09)
- Jimmy Smith (2007–09)

== Affiliate stations ==
(Broadcasters of Monday Night Football on Triple M)

- Triple M Sydney
- Triple M Brisbane
- Triple M Melbourne (Storm games only)
- Triple M Central West
- Triple M Central Queensland
- Triple M Coffs Coast
- Triple M Darling Downs
- Triple M Fraser Coast
- Triple M Mid North Coast
- Triple M Riverina
- Triple M Townsville
- KOFM Newcastle
- Mix 106.3 Canberra
- 4AM Mareeba
- 4SB Kingaroy
- 4GC Charters Towers
- 4LM Mount Isa
- 4ZR Roma
- 4HI Emerald

== History ==
=== 2007 ===
After years of being rumoured to have desired a piece of the rugby league radio rights, and an offbeat call of the 1998 Rugby League State of Origin series (fronted by Andrew Denton and Billy Birmingham), Austereo acquired the exclusive commercial rights to the newly re-created Monday Night Football in late 2006.

The original team was Anthony Maroon (main caller), with Mark Geyer, Kevin Walters and Jimmy Smith sharing expert commentary duties (two experts would be in the box at a given match, Walters used primarily for the Queensland-based matches), while Dan Ginnane was the sideline commentator.

The coverage would commence at 6:30pm and conclude shortly after full-time, usually just after 9pm.

The first Monday Night Football on Triple M match was on 19 March 2007, with South Sydney defeating the Sydney Roosters 18–6 at Sydney Football Stadium.

=== 2008 ===
Phil Gould joined Monday Night Football on Triple M, resulting in a major reshuffle. Gould became the sole expert in the commentary box, with Mark Geyer leaving the team and Jimmy Smith moved to the sideline role. Dan Ginnane became host of the expanded programme, which began the season commencing at 6pm. This was changed to 6:40pm, except for a special edition two days after the sudden departure of Sonny Bill Williams, resulting in the most controversial Monday Night Football on Triple M broadcast.

The opening Monday night game of the season saw Melbourne Storm defeat New Zealand Warriors 32–18 at Docklands Stadium.

=== 2009 ===
Anthony Maroon left Triple M for Sydney FM rival Vega during the off season, with Dan Ginnane becoming the main commentator. With comedy duo Roy & HG joining the station, Monday Night Football on Triple M commenced at 7pm in 2009, with an added new programme 'The Verdict' running from the end of the game until approximately 9:30pm, focusing on the issues from the weekend. Audience text messages were incorporated into the broadcast. The first broadcast of the season was from Campbelltown Stadium, with the Wests Tigers defeating Canberra Raiders 34–26.

=== 2010 ===
Phil Gould and Jimmy Smith departed for Peter Sterling and Andrew Johns. Neither Sterling nor Johns had previously provided regular commentary on radio. The format from 2009 (7pm-9:30pm EST) remained.

The first broadcast of the season saw Wests Tigers defeat Manly 26–22 at Sydney Football Stadium

=== 2010 Four Nations tournament ===
Roy & HG returned to Rugby League calling for the first time in over two years when they provided a play-by-play coverage of Australia v Papua New Guinea on 24 October

Dan Ginnane, Mark Geyer, Jason Taylor and Steve Mascord took over to call the remainder of the tournament.

== Controversies and other moments ==
The first broadcast on 19 March 2007 was noted for sideline commentator Dan Ginnane entering the South Sydney owners box in an attempt to interview Rabbitohs co-owner Russell Crowe. What resulted was an interview with other co-owner Peter Holmes-a-Court. Crowe gave an extended interview a month later.

On 26 March 2007, John Cartwright (Gold Coast Titans) was the first coach to speak to Monday Night Football on Triple M at the half time break, something which would become a regular feature. The Titans defeated Cronulla Sharks 18–16 at Carrara.

On that same night, Titans prop Luke Bailey delivered the first profanity on the broadcast, uttering 'fuck' in a post-match interview

Andrew Johns' final NRL match was on a Monday Night in round 3, 2007. Newcastle Knights lost to Canberra Raiders 48–18 at Canberra Stadium. Johns retired shortly after with a neck injury.

Russell Crowe created headlines when he slammed NRL boss David Gallop on 8 July 2008

Two days after the sudden departure of Sonny Bill Williams to France, Phil Gould went toe-to-toe with NRL boss David Gallop on 28 July 2008 , in an interview which dominated headlines for days. The sparring led to the removal of Gould from the following edition of Channel 9's The Footy Show.

The opening moments of the 2009 season of Monday Night Football on Triple M were occupied by comedy duo Roy & HG, who used to airtime to petition for a new team to be established at Graeme Park, Gosford

Phil Gould was forced to miss the match on 7 June 2009, because of the possibility he contracted Swine Flu. Gould had sat near Queensland forward Ben Hannant - who was diagnosed with Swine Flu - on Channel 9's The Footy Show the previous Thursday. Jimmy Smith moved into the commentary box with Dan Ginnane as Gold Coast Titans beat St George Illawarra Dragons 28–24 at Robina Stadium.

Triple M comedy duo Roy & HG were denied the opportunity to call Rugby League State of Origin - something the pair had done for two decades on Triple J - because it would infringe on Austereo's Monday Night Football rights.

As was the case 12 months earlier, Triple M comedy duo Roy and HG opened the season 2010 broadcast. This time they humorously congratulated management for 'dumping' Gould, who was "holding them back" with his "negativity and constant references to 90s sitcom Seinfeld". Gould had left Monday Night Football on Triple M on his own terms weeks earlier.

Andrew Johns voluntarily stood down from his duties on 14 June 2010, following his resignation from the NSW Blues coaching staff in the wake of the Timana Tahu racism saga. He returned the following week, speaking openly about the subject for the first time.
