= Anthony Maroon =

Australian radio personality

- Occupation: radio presenter
- Known for: Triple M Sydney radio presenter, NRL commentator

Anthony Maroon is a Sydney-born radio personality at Triple M Sydney as an NRL commentator.

== Career ==
Maroon graduated from Max Rowley's Media Academy in 1989. His first on-air radio job was at station 2NZ in Inverell, where he worked on the weekend breakfast show and later on the weekday breakfast show. He left 2NZ in November 1990 to become the evening drive announcer at 2GN in Goulburn.

Maroon's third station was i98FM in Wollongong, where he began on the late-evening shif, but soon after was promoted to the breakfast show. He also hosted the football program on the local television channel, WIN TV.

A few years later, he took a job doing late evenings at Triple M Sydney. In January 2008, Maroon took on the role of anchor for the breakfast radio show The Shebang, and commentator of Triple M's Monday Night Football alongside Phil Gould and Jimmy Smith.

In December, Maroon joined Vega 95.3 as a drive announcer, replacing Jason Stavely. About the same time, he hosted post-game functions at Stadium Australia for the South Sydney Rabbitohs. In 2010, he called North Queensland Cowboys rugby league games on weekends for 4TO in Townsville and 99.5 Sea FM in Cairns.

In mid-2012, Maroon returned to Triple M Sydney as a fill-in announcer until December 2012. He replaced Rod (“Love Rod”) Maldon on afternoons. In 2013, he changed to mornings (9am–12pm), swapping with Chris (“Becko”) Beckhouse.
