= 1638 AM =

AM radio frequency

The following radio stations broadcast on AM frequency 1638 kHz:

== Australia ==
- 2ME Radio Arabic in Castle Hill, New South Hills.
- Vision Christian Radio in Armidale, New South Wales.

== See also ==
- AM expanded band
