= 88.0 FM =

FM radio frequency

This is a list of radio stations that broadcast on the FM frequency 88.0 MHz:

== Australia ==
- Radio Austral in Canberra, Australian Capital Territory
- Raw FM (Australian radio network) in Coffs Harbour, New South Wales
- Vision Radio Network in Cootamundra, New South Wales
- Planet Radio in Brisbane, Queensland
- Red Dirt Radio in Bundaberg, Queensland
- Radio ENA in Adelaide, South Australia
- Radio TAB in Naracoorte, South Australia
- Radio TAB in Mount Gambier, South Australia
- Radio TAB in Port Pirie, South Australia
- Vision Radio Network in Woomera, South Australia

== Bangladesh ==
- Radio Foorti

== China ==
- Guangzhou MYFM880 in Guangzhou

== Indonesia ==
- Mustang 88 FM in Jakarta

== Israel ==
- Kan 88 in the Galilee Panhandle, Gush Dan, Jerusalem, the Jordan Rift Valley and Negev

== New Zealand ==
- Various low-power stations up to 1 watt

== Turkey ==
- TRT-4 at Hatay

== United Kingdom ==
- Heart North and Mid Wales in Wrexham and Chester
