= 1647 AM =

AM radio frequency

The following radio stations broadcast on AM frequency 1647 kHz:

== Australia ==
- Vision Christian Radio in Mackay, Queensland
- 2ME Radio Arabic in Brisbane, Queensland

== See also ==
- AM expanded band
