= 1665 AM =

AM radio frequency

The following radio stations broadcast on AM frequency 1665 kHz:

== Australia ==
- 2MM in Dulwich Hill, New South Wales.
- Vision Christian Radio in Melbourne (eastern), Victoria.

== See also ==
- AM expanded band
