= Ian Dickson (TV personality) =

Australian television personality (born 1963)

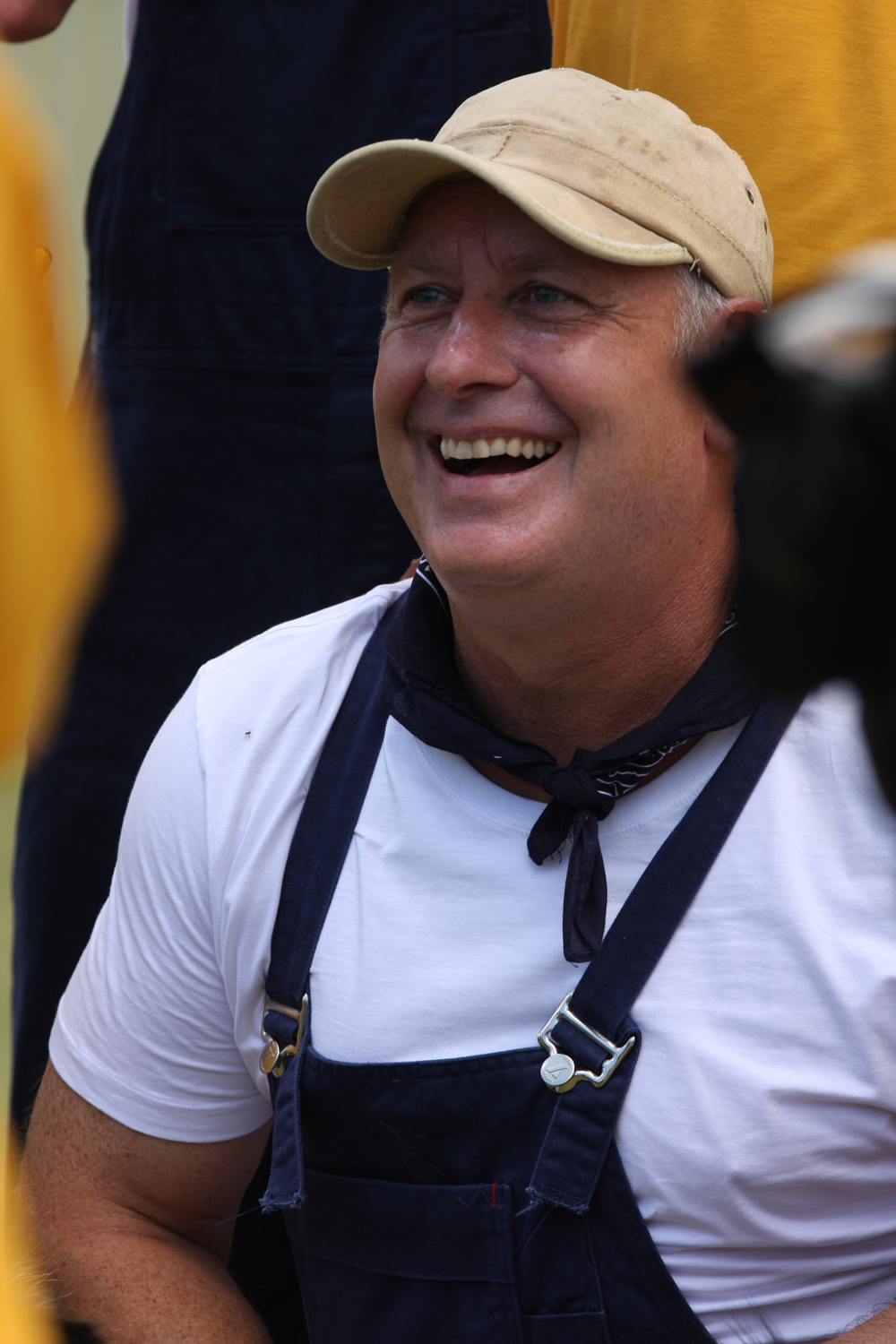
- Born: Ian Ross Perrygrove; 28 March 1963 (age 63); Birmingham, Warwickshire, England
- Other name: Dicko
- Occupations: Television and radio personality; producer; music journalist}; former record label executive
- Years active: 2003–present
- Known for: Australian Idol, The Next Great American Band and Australia's Got Talent
- Spouse: Melanie Bell
- Children: 2
- Website: iandickson.com.au

Ian Ross Perrygrove (born 28 March 1963) better known as Ian "Dicko" Dickson or simply "Dicko" is an English Australian television and radio presenter, television producer, music journalist and former record company executive and talent scout. He has been a talent judge on Australian Idol, The Next Great American Band, the 2012 reboot of Young Talent Time and Australia's Got Talent. He previously spent over twenty years working in the record industry in both the U.K. and Australia, for labels including Creation Records, Sony, A&M and BMG and for music acts including Celine Dion, Ozzy Osbourne, Primal Scream and Pearl Jam.

== Early life and education ==
Dickson is the grandson of former professional footballer Ian Dickson from Dumfries. As well as playing for hometown club Queen of the South, Dickson the footballer also played for Middlesbrough and for Aston Villa; while playing for the last he set roots in Birmingham, his grandson's home town.

Dickson graduated from the University of Nottingham with a degree in politics in 1985. He met his wife, Melanie Bell, in Bristol around the same time. His first job in the music industry was as Press and Promotions Manager for Creation Records, and he managed bands including The Jesus and Mary Chain, Primal Scream, Felt, Weather Prophets, My Bloody Valentine and Oasis. He also wrote freelance reviews and features as a music journalist for Melody Maker and Record Mirror.

== Career ==
=== 1989–2004: Recording industry ===
In 1989, Dickson joined Sony Music UK (then CBS Records) as a press officer, managing Public Enemy, LL Cool J, Midnight Oil, Warrant and Michael Bolton. In 1990, he moved to the Epic Records label as a marketing executive working with Pearl Jam, Ozzy Osbourne, Living Colour, Screaming Trees and Celine Dion. He became Director of International for Sony UK in 1993, overseeing global strategies for all Epic and S2 label artists, including Jamiroquai, Des'ree, Reef, Manic Street Preachers and Basia. He moved to A&M Records UK in 1994 as Director of International, looking after acts such as Chris De Burgh, Therapy, Del Amitri, The Bluetones and the Mowax label, including DJ Shadow, Money Mark and U.N.C.L.E.

In 2001, he moved to Sydney to take up the position of General Manager of Marketing for Sony BMG Australia, and remained in the role until August 2004.

=== 2003–2004: Australian Idol ===
In 2003, Dickson took up his best-known role—as the "nasty" judge on Australian Idol in the first and second seasons—alongside fellow judges Marcia Hines and Mark Holden. The first series premiered on 27 July 2003 on Network Ten. Viewers initially disliked him for his insensitive, cold attitude (including controversial comments on a female contestant's weight), but towards the end of his tenure he became popular for his candid assessments of performances based on his expertise and experience within the record industry.

Dickson also served as Australia’s judge on the first (and only) World Idol in December 2003, where he caused a stir with his comment to Norwegian Idol winner Kurt Nilsen: “Kurt, you are a hell of a marketing challenge, because you have the voice of an angel, but you look like a Hobbit.” Nilsen ultimately won the competition with 106 points.

=== 2005–2006: Seven Network ===
Near the end of the 2004 series of Australian Idol, it was announced that Dickson would be leaving the show and Network Ten to move to the Seven Network to broaden his interests as a presenter and producer. The move caused controversy at the time, as the popularity of Idol and Dickson himself were at their peak. His first role at the Seven Network in 2005 was as host of the second season of reality TV series My Restaurant Rules, succeeding Curtis Stone. Also that year he was a contestant in Dancing with the Stars, placing third.

During this time, Dickson and his business partner and manager, David Wilson, formed Watercooler Media, an independent television production company.

In December 2005, Dickson began his first stint on radio, hosting the morning show on Sydney and Melbourne radio stations Vega 95.3 and Vega 91.5, both part of the Vega radio network.

In 2006, Dickson was the host of Australian Celebrity Survivor on the Seven Network.

=== 2007–2009: Return to Australian Idol and Network Ten ===
On 30 November 2006, The Sydney Morning Herald reported that Dickson would return to Network Ten in 2007 to become a fourth judge on the fifth season of Australian Idol, rejoining Mark Holden, Marcia Hines and his successor Kyle Sandilands. Season five premiered on 5 August 2007.

Also in 2007 Dickson accepted an offer to be a judge on The Next Great American Band on Fox in the U.S. He was scouted by American Idol executive producers Nigel Lythgoe and Ken Warwick based on his performance at World Idol four years earlier. His fellow judges were Sheila E. and John Rzeznik, and the series premiered on 19 October 2007. Australian Idol and The Next Great American Band were filmed simultaneously, which meant Dickson traveled back and forth between the U.S. and Australia for his filming duties.

In 2008 and 2009, he was again a judge on Australian Idol for seasons six and seven, the final seasons of the series.

In January 2008, it was announced that Dickson would be hosting the breakfast radio show on Vega 91.5 alongside comedian Dave O'Neil and former Big Brother runner-up Chrissie Swan, replacing Denise Scott and Shaun Micallef. The breakfast show was titled Dicko, Dave & Chrissie. Chrissie left the show in 2009 and Dickson and O'Neil continued the show for one more year until its end in 2010.

=== 2010–2011: Can of Worms ===
On 4 July 2011 Can of Worms premiered on Network Ten with Dickson and Meshel Laurie as hosts. He and his business partner and manager, David Wilson, developed the show, in which celebrities were required to answer yes or no before a live studio audience to tricky moral questions such as, "Is it wrong to tell your kids there is no God?" and "If a woman has had a boob job, is it an open invitation to have a good look?". He and Wilson had pitched the show several times to various TV networks from 2005 to 2009, finally selling the concept to Network Ten with a pitch meeting where Dickson acted as host and the executives the contestants. At the end of the first series he elected not to return as a host of subsequent series but remained as an executive producer. Can of Worms lasted two more seasons with Chrissie Swan and Dan Illic as hosts and ended in 2014.

=== 2012–2014: Young Talent Time, The Celebrity Apprentice Australia and return to radio ===
After leaving his hosting duties on Can of Worms at the end of 2011, Dickson became a judge on the 2012 reboot of Young Talent Time, initially as a guest judge while Tina Arena was away ill before becoming a full time judge during the finals. He joined the cast of the second season of The Celebrity Apprentice Australia, which premiered on the Nine Network on 18 April 2012. He was announced the winner of the series in the final episode, and split his earnings with runner-up Nathan Joliffee. He won A$204,253 for his nominated charity, The Australian Children's Music Foundation. His soft side seen during the series and the final was in contrast to his persona as the hard-as-nails judge on Australian Idol.

After his win Dickson returned to Europe to spend some time with his family. Upon his return to Australia, he announced he would be returning to radio in 2013 as the breakfast host on Sydney talkback AM radio station 2UE alongside 2UE police reporter Sarah Morice. In 2014 Dickson and Morice moved to the 12pm-3pm shift hosting their show Afternoons with Dicko & Sarah. The show came to an end at the end of 2014.

=== 2015–present: Return to the judges' chair and First Contact ===
In July 2015, Dickson played Widow Twanky in Bonnie Lythgoe's stage production of Aladdin and his Wondrous Lamp at the State Theatre in Sydney, Australia. Jessica Rowe and Beau Ryan also appeared in the production.

On 28 October 2015, it was announced that Dickson would be one of the four new judges on the Nine Network's new Australia's Got Talent. The series premiered on 1 February 2016 with Dickson as a judge alongside Kelly Osbourne, Sophie Monk and Eddie Perfect.

Starting on 29 November 2016, Dickson appeared in the second season of the TV series First Contact on SBS, one of six well known Australians spending twenty-eight days living in various Indigenous communities across Australia.

From 2 April 2023, Dickson appeared as a contestant in the ninth season of I'm a Celebrity...Get Me Out of Here!. Dickson was eliminated 3rd on 19 April 2023.

In October 2025, Dickson was revealed to be competing on the forthcoming third season of The Traitors Australia, with the series set to air on Network 10 in 2026.

== Personal life ==
Dickson is married to Melanie Bell; they have two daughters and live on the Sunshine Coast. He became an Australian citizen on Australia Day, 26 January 2006, presented by then Prime Minister John Howard.

He is good friends with his Pop Idol and American Idol counterpart Simon Cowell, going back to their days working together in the British music industry. It was Cowell who convinced Dickson to take the role as the "villain judge", despite his reservations given that he was relatively new to his adopted homeland and wanted to settle at a gradual pace. Cowell guaranteed immediate money and fame as incentives.

Dickson is a Foundation Member and ambassador of the Western Sydney Wanderers Football Club and was one of 14 Australian supporters who traveled to Saudi Arabia to watch the club win the AFC Champions League title in 2014.

On an episode of the ABC Australian news program Four Corners broadcast on 19 February 2007, Dickson discussed his problems with alcohol.

Am I an alcoholic or not? Yes, I think, I think I am an alcoholic. I think a lot more people are living under the cosh of booze than they are prepared to recognise. And it's actually quite liberating when you understand that, because you realise there's lots of people in the same boat. You don't have to be sitting on a street corner urinating in your trousers and shadow boxing to be a drunk. I'm living proof.

Dickson is an atheist: "I have developed a spirituality which I suppose you could call metaphysics or science of mind – nothing to do with Scientology, I hasten to add. It's something that was developed by a guy called Ernest Holmes, and it's about the law of the universe, the law of attraction. It's all that stuff that's been popular on The Secret but there's far more to it than that. I'm an atheist but I've got a spirituality I can fall back on. I don't like religion because I see it as a bureaucracy of faith and I've never really been big on bureaucracy."
