= 1629 AM =

AM radio frequency

The following radio stations broadcast on AM frequency 1629 kHz:

== Australia ==
- Rete Italia in Shepparton, Victoria.
- Radio 1629am in Newcastle, New South Wales.
- Vision Christian Radio in Bathurst, New South Wales.
- SEN SA (1629) in Adelaide, South Australia

== Japan ==
- Highway advisory radio

== See also ==
- AM expanded band
