= 1674 AM =

AM radio frequency

The following radio stations broadcast on AM frequency 1674 kHz:

== Australia ==
- Radio Haanji in Melbourne, Victoria.
- Radio Haanji in Sydney, New South Wales.

== Philippines ==
- DZBF in Marikina, Luzon.

== See also ==
- AM expanded band
