= Star 104.5 =

Radio station in Gosford, Australia

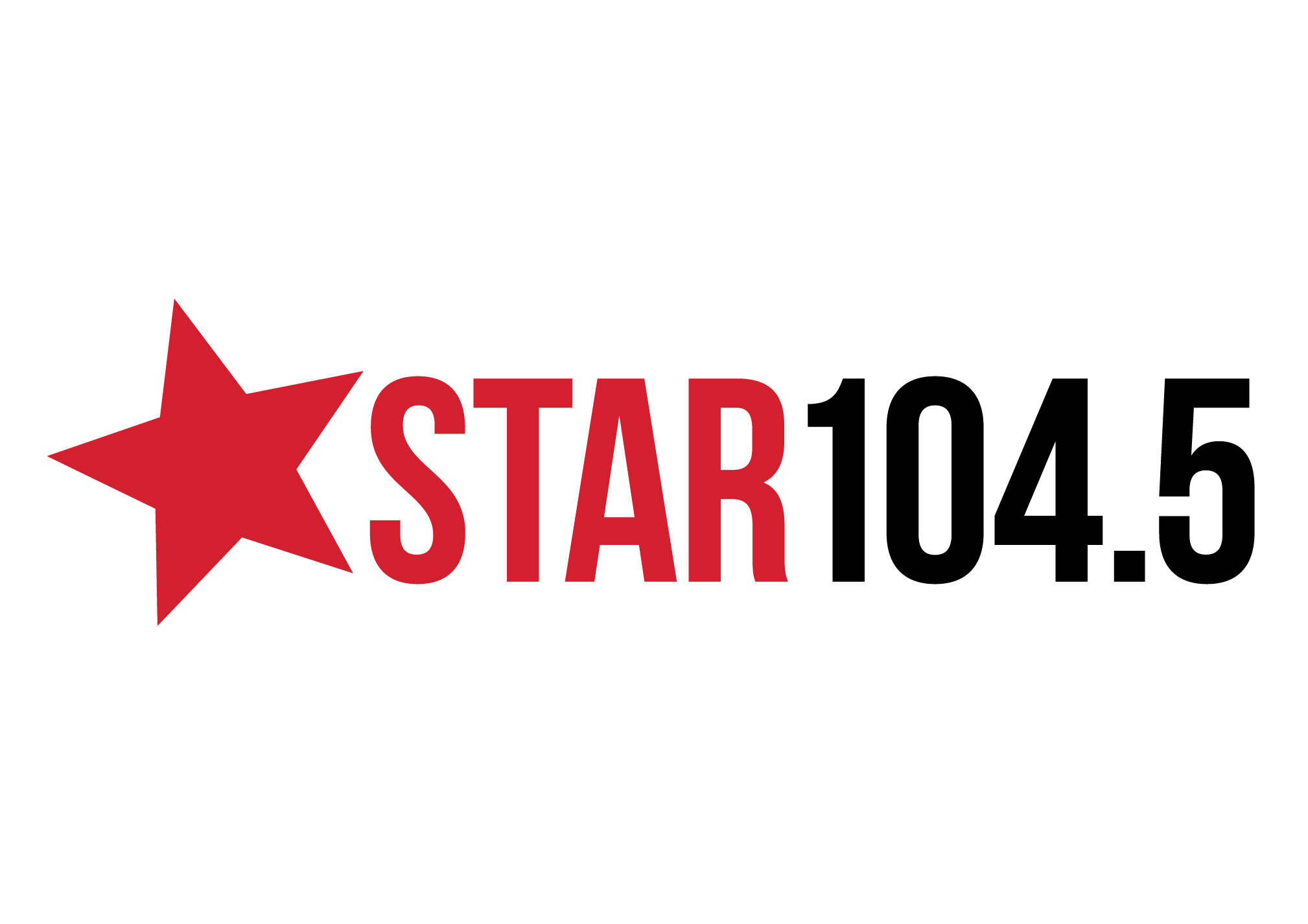
- Gosford, New South Wales; Australia
- Broadcast area: Central Coast
- Frequency: 104.5 MHz
- Branding: Star 104.5

Programming
- Language: English
- Format: Top 40 (CHR)

Ownership
- Owner: Nova Entertainment; (Star 1045 Pty Ltd)
- Sister stations: Nova 96.9, Smooth 95.3

History
- First air date: 16 March 2004
- Call sign meaning: 2 prefix for New South Wales and "Gosford"

Technical information
- Licensing authority: Australian Communications & Media Authority
- ERP: 16 kW

Links
- Webcast: Star 104.5 Live Stream
- Website: www.star1045.com.au

Star 104.5 (ACMA call sign 2GOS) is a commercial radio station broadcasting to the Central Coast region from Gosford, New South Wales, Australia. It is owned by Nova Entertainment. It is licensed to broadcast to a coverage area stretching from Brooklyn in the south, to Morisset in the north, however fortuitous coverage into most areas of Sydney, parts of the Blue Mountains and Newcastle is also possible due to the close proximity of both markets. Star 104.5's studios are located in Erina, while the stations transmitter facility is located in Somersby.

== History ==
The station launched at 17:15 on 16 March 2004 as "104.5 Star FM", with an Adult Contemporary format of "80's, 90's and Today". 104.5 Star FM was commercial free for the first week after launching, before implementing a "Never more than 4 ads in a row" promise. Enrique Iglesias was flown into the station's studios in Erina by helicopter for the launch, along with the inaugural breakfast team of Meshel Laurie and Todd Widdicombe. The first song played on the station was "Not In Love" by Enrique Iglesias.

In 2006, Star 104.5 changed format from Adult Contemporary, to Rock Variety with the position statement of "Star 104.5 Plays Rockstars". The station also had a change in breakfast team with Meshel Laurie leaving the station. Vic Davies and Kim Czosnek joined Todd Widdicombe on the breakfast show.

The "Rockstars" format continued through to 2011, when Star 104.5 moved away from a pure rock format to Adult Hits and adopted the position statement of "The Music We All Love". Throughout this time, Star 104.5 still played Rock Music among other genres.

== Current format ==
Star 104.5's current "More Music Variety" positioner was launched in 2015, with a strong focus on pop music from the 1980's to today.

As of mid-2021, the station played an average of 12 tracks per hour, comprising three songs from the 1980s, three from the 1990s, and the remainder from the 2000s and 2010s. During 2023, the amount of older music in the playlist was reduced, and in early 2024, the station dropped music from the 1980s entirely.

The station runs many popular promotions such as Katy Perry's $20,000 Superstar Secret, Ed Sheeran's $20,000 Superstar Secret, $50,000 Mystery Words and $50,000 Secret Sound.

== Audience reception ==
In the 2017 Gosford radio ratings, for the first time in the station's history, Star 104.5 had the biggest audience in the region with 80,600 weekly listeners aged 10+ tuning in.

Between 2017 and present day, Star 104.5 has consistently performed well on the Central Coast. In 2022, Star 104.5 was the Number 1 Station for All People aged 10+, with every show on the station also Number 1 for All People aged 10+.

In 2023, the most recent radio ratings for the Central Coast saw Star 104.5 again secure the Number 1 position for All People aged 10+, a full 3.4 points ahead of their nearest competitor.

== Technology ==
Star 104.5 (and the wider Nova Entertainment network) use the state of the art Zetta playout system from Radio Computing Services, and is programmed using the "G-Selector" music scheduling system. The Nova Entertainment network employ a shared music library across all stations in the group, with all music being stored in a lossless audio format.

== Current Lineup ==
Weekdays:

- Early Breakfast with Meg Alexander (5:00am to 5:30am)
- Star 104.5 Breakfast with Gina & Matty (5:30am to 9:00am)
- Adam Price (9am - 3pm)
- Meg Alexander (3pm - 7pm)
- More Music Variety Overnight (7:00pm to 5:00am)

Saturdays:

- More Music Variety (12:00am to 6:00pm)
- Saturday Night Party Hits (6:00pm to 2:00am)

Sundays:

- More Music Variety (2:00am to 6:00pm)
- Gina and Matty Podcast Show (6:00pm to 10:00pm)
- More Music Variety Overnight (10:00pm to 5:00am)

The weekend and early breakfast programmes are hosted by a range of presenters.

== Current Management ==
- Market Lead: Paul Moltzen
- Program Director & Music Director: Shayne Sinclair
- Audience Engagement Director: Lauren Montgomery
- Creative Director: Matt Lygo

== Past notable on air members ==
- Meshel Laurie
- Todd Widdicombe – 92.7 Mix FM
- Vic Davies
- Julie Goodwin
- Kim Czosnek
- Kent Small
- Ugly Phil
- Dave Evans
- Rod & The Flack
- Alice Cooper
- Jess Hardy
- Craig Annis
- Michael McPhee
- Dave "Rabbit" Rabbetts
- Dion Clewett
