= HEART 103.2 =

HEART 103.2 may refer to:

- Heart North West in Kendal, Cumbria
- Hope 103.2 in New South Wales
