= 1620 AM =

AM radio frequency

Because 1620 kHz is a multiple of both 9 and 10, the frequency is available for use by broadcast stations in all three ITU regions.

The following radio stations broadcast on AM frequency 1620 kHz:

== Argentina ==
- Italia in Villa Martelli, Buenos Aires
- Mitre Cañada de Gómez in Cañada de Gómez, Santa Fe
- Sentires in Merlo

== Australia ==
- 1RF in Canberra, ACT
- 2KM in Sydney, NSW
- 2RF in Eden, NSW
- 2RF in Wagga Wagga, NSW
- 4KZ in Taylors Beach, QLD (relays 4KZ in Innisfail, QLD)
- 4BRZ in Toowoomba, QLD
- Italian Media Group - in Brisbane, QLD
- 6?? in Perth, WA
- NTC Radio in Hobart, TAS

== Japan ==
- Highway advisory radio

== Mexico ==
- XECSCGU-AM in Guachochi, Chihuahua
- XECSIA-AM in Pátzcuaro, Michoacán

== United States ==
1620 AM is a Regional broadcast frequency. All stations operate with 10 kW during the daytime and 1 kW at nighttime and are Class B stations.

Call sign	City of license	Facility ID	Transmitter coordinates
KOZN	Bellevue, Nebraska	87182	41.189167°N 96.005278°W
KSMH	West Sacramento, California	87036	38.588056°N 121.468056°W
KYIZ	Renton, Washington	86941	47.441111°N 122.202778°W
WDHP	Frederiksted, Virgin Islands	87117	17.724444°N 64.884167°W
WNRP	Gulf Breeze, Florida	87034	30.436667°N 87.220278°W
WTAW	College Station, Texas	87145	30.620833°N 96.254444°W

== See also ==
- AM expanded band
- List of AM Expanded Band station assignments issued by the Federal Communications Commission on March 17, 1997
