= 1611 AM =

AM radio frequency

The following radio stations broadcast on AM frequency 1611 kHz:

== Australia ==
- Vision Christian Radio in Melbourne (western), Victoria and western Sydney, New South Wales
- Old Gold 1611AM in Mildura, Victoria.
- GoldMX 1611AM in Albany, Western Australia.
- Easy Listening 1611am in Wagin, Western Australia.

== See also ==
- AM expanded band
