= 1656 AM =

AM radio frequency

The following radio stations broadcast on AM frequency 1656 kHz:

== Australia ==
- VAC Chinese Radio in Brisbane, Queensland.
- Radio Rhythm in Melbourne, Victoria.
- 2ME Radio Arabic in Perth, Western Australia

== See also ==
- AM expanded band
