= 1701 (disambiguation) =

1701 may refer to:

- 1701, the year
- 1701 AM, an AM radio frequency
- 1701 Naval Air Squadron of the Fleet Air Arm
- Anno 1701, alternatively titled 1701 A.D., a real-time strategy computer game.
- Commodore 1701, a Commodore 64 peripheral
- Starship Enterprise, a ship in the fictional Star Trek universe which has the registry number of NCC-1701. Each successive Enterprise has an alphanumeric suffix running from A to at least J.
- United Nations Security Council Resolution 1701
