= Smooth Relax =

Smooth Relax may refer to:

- Smooth Relax (Australian radio station), Australian digital radio station and part of the smoothfm network
- Smooth Relax (UK radio station), UK radio station and part of the Smooth Radio network
