= 1692 AM =

AM radio frequency

The following radio stations broadcast on AM frequency 1692 kHz:

== Australia ==
- Radio Rhythm in Perth, Western Australia.
- Radio Symban in Campbeltown, New South Wales.

== See also ==
- AM expanded band
