= Daniel Widdowson =

Australian radio, theatre, television and film actor, artistic director and writer

Daniel Widdowson is an Australian radio, theatre, television and film actor, artistic director at Salt House Creative and writer, who was an Australian of the Year finalist at age 19 for contributions to the arts, finalist in the Young Australian Playwright's awards, and recipient of the Collins Bookseller's Arts award. He hosted and wrote for popular children's show Saturday Disney in 2000, a gig that lasted seven years. In that time he also played the handyman sidekick on Ground Force and wrote scripts for Home & Away. Moving into radio in 2007, he formed half the team of Hope Breakfast on Hope 103.2. Having penned several documentaries, children's dramas, and stage plays, Daniel became a member of the Australian Writer's Guild. In 2016 he and his wife Leia established Salt House Creative on the Central Coast, NSW. Due to the success of Daniel's stage adaptation of Pride & Prejudice he was invited to become an ambassador for the Jane Austen Literacy Foundation.

== Current day ==
Daniel currently works in television, film and theatre whilst serving as the Artistic Director for Salt House Theatre Company, whilst producing and performing other in works in television, film, radio, and theatre.

== TV career ==
Daniel is best known as Disney Dan, former host of Saturday Disney kids program from 2000 to 2007. He has worked on Home & Away, Ground Force, The Big Arvo, Last King of the Cross, NCIS: Sydney, Harrow, RFDS, Colin From Accounts, The One, Sunrise, and has made several other guest appearances.

== Radio career ==
Dan's radio career started at Hope 103.2 Sydney formerly 2CBA. With his exposure on Disney Dan, Aaron Wright from the breakfast team invited Dan to join the station as co-host at the suggestion of Stephen "Supertech" Wilkinson. His foray into radio began in 2007 as half of the comedy breakfast team Aaron and Dan on Sydney Radio Station Hope 103.2 with Aaron Wright. When asked how he broke into Radio Dan responded, 'Aaron asked me.' He presented and produced local radio on Norfolk Island for three years from 2011 to 2013. During this time he also ran the island's television station, TVNI.

== Film ==
Primarily a presenter, Daniel has also guest starred in various films including the American film A Colt is My Passport, Get Free, Book of Job, Equivocal Redemption & Suing the Devil. Also the community film in 2018's feature Xavier's Harvest.

== Writer ==
Dan was one of the writers for the TV Series Home and Away.

In early 2010 Dan finished an illicit drug documentary in partnership with the Centre for Customs and Excise Studies at the University of Canberra, explaining the origins of major drugs and the effects they have on the human body.

In late 2010 he underwent a 6-month method acting assignment with a professional body builder for a body builder documentary, spending 6 months in the life of a body builder, eating measured amounts six times a day, consuming protein content, and working out six days a week, following the same routine as a professional body builder.

=== Film/TV ===
Year	Title	Role
2025	A Colt is my Passport	Lyle
2025	NCIS Sydney	Scalpel
2018	Xavier's Harvest	Feature Film
2018	Deadly Women	Greg Morton
2017	One Good Friday	Short Film
2017	Star Wars Quiz	Jedi Knight
2011	Superset Me	Documentary
2011	Suing The Devil	Feature Film
2010	Rendezvous 6	Film
2010	Short Film - Two Men on a Dustbin	himself
2000-07	Saturday Disney	Presenter/Actor
2004-05	Ground Force	Presenter
2000-05	Good Friday Appeal	Presenter
2005	Worth the Wait	
2002-04	The Big Arvo	
2002	The Boxing Guy	
2001	Carols in the Domain	Performer
2000	Perth Telethon	Presenter

=== Writer/awards ===
Year	Title	Type
2010	Knowledge Beyond Borders	Documentary
2011	Superset Me	Documentary
2010	Rendezvous 6	Film
2010	Illicit Drugs	Documentary
2009	Aaron & Dan's Christmas Carol	Radio Drama
2008	The Lonely Elf Who Saved Christmas Day	Radio Drama
2008	Ways of Our Lives	Radio Drama
2007	10 Days, 9 Months	Radio Drama
2007	Home and Away Ep. 4389	TV Drama
2006	Home and Away Ep. 4284	TV Drama
2006	Home and Away Ep. 4242	TV Drama
2006	Home and Away Ep. 4214	TV Drama
2006	A Page in Time	Children's Mini Drama
2005	The Act of Fabrication	Stage Play
2003	Tell Tale Trio	Stage/TV Skits
2002	The Boxing Guy	Short Film

Year	Award	Entry
1999	Young Australian of the Year Finalist	The Act of Ventrication-Stage Play
1999	Collin's Booksellers Arts Award	The Act of Ventrication-Stage Play
1999	Canberra Area Theatre Award	The Act of Ventrication-Stage Play
1999	Young Australian Playwright's Finalist	Our Inner Selves-Stage Play
