= 1986 Norfolk Island television referendum =

| 21 May 1986 |
- Would television as proposed by the Norfolk Island Government be good for Norfolk Island?

Results
| Choice | Votes | % |
|---|---|---|
| Yes | 489 | 50.67% |
| No | 476 | 49.33% |
| Valid votes | 965 | 99.18% |
| Invalid or blank votes | 8 | 0.82% |
| Total votes | 973 | 100.00% |

A referendum on introducing state television was held in Norfolk Island on 21 May 1986. It was a citizen-initiated vote. Voters were asked "Would television as proposed by the Norfolk Island Government be good for Norfolk Island?".

The proposal was approved by 50.7% of voters, with the "yes" option receiving just 13 more votes than "no". Following the referendum, legislation to fund the television service was approved by the Norfolk Island Legislative Assembly.

== See also ==
- TV Norfolk Island
