= Smooth 91.5 =

Radio station in Melbourne, Australia

Smooth 91.5 (3PTV)
- Melbourne, Victoria; Australia
- Frequency: 91.5 MHz
- Branding: smoothfm 91.5

Programming
- Language: English
- Format: Easy listening
- Affiliations: smoothfm

Ownership
- Owner: Nova Entertainment (UK Radio 3) Pty Ltd
- Sister stations: Nova 100

History
- First air date: 5 September 2005
- Former names: Vega 91.5 (2005–2010); Classic Rock 91.5 (2010–2011); Melbourne's 91.5FM (2011–2012)

Technical information
- Licensing authority: ACMA
- ERP: 56 kW
- Transmitter coordinates: 37.834892°S 145.348713°E

Links
- Public licence information: Profile
- Website: www.smoothfm.com.au/station/smooth915

Smooth 91.5 (call sign: 3PTV) is a commercial radio station based in Melbourne, Victoria, Australia.

The station is owned by Nova Entertainment along with sister stationNova 100, and currently plays easy listening songs from the late-1950s/early-1960s to the present with a 55+ year span.

== History ==
The station first named Vega began with a music and talk format, however it switched to a music format in 2006. In 2010, its format became 'Classic Rock' playing primarily rock artists from the '70s and '80s and targeted listeners 35–54, which would make its then competitors Gold 104.3 and Triple M. After a somewhat shaky start the station seemed to be growing slowly but consistently and then at the time had around 400,000 listeners (AC Nielsen Official Survey 6 in 2009).

At the end of 2009, Vega moved to a model with no announcers outside of the Dicko and Dave morning show, with the result being a very high focus on music quantity post 9am. Alice Cooper started as the nights host on the station on 12 March 2010.

On 12 March 2010 the Vega brand was dropped and the station was relaunched with new a format as 'Classic Rock 91.5' to counteract the 'classic hits' station Gold 104.3 and the contemporary active rock station Triple M. DMG Radio Australia announced the change as Vega's brand as the station has struggled towards the bottom of the ratings ladder in both Melbourne and Sydney. In building these new stations, DMG needed a "simple, focused music concept that would appeal to the 35–54 audience." according to CEO Cathy O'Connor.

On 21 May 2012, the station was again rebranded with a new format and name, 'smoothfm 91.5'.

In May 2012, it was announced that Michael Bublé would be the face of smoothfm. He was later dropped and replaced with Sam Smith.

In March 2017, smoothfm 91.5 was crowned the number 1 FM station for the first time with a 9.4 share. As of April 2018, it has an audience share of 10.3%.

In January 2023, smoothfm 91.5 re-located from studios at 678 Victoria Street, Richmond (with sister station Nova 100) to 257 Clarendon Street, South Melbourne. Southern Cross Austereo's Triple M previously occupied the studios.

== See also ==
- Smooth 95.3
- smoothfm
