= TVNI =

TVNI (TV Norfolk Island) is a television channel on Norfolk Island broadcasting advertisements for local businesses and tourist information. It is the only terrestrial television channel native on Norfolk Island; the island is also served by satellite television from the Australian mainland.

== See also ==
- 1986 Norfolk Island television referendum
- Dan Widdowson, operator (2011−2013)
