= 1710 AM =

AM radio frequency

While many AM-band radios can be tuned to 1710 kHz, it is above the standard upper limit of 1700 kHz assigned to the AM broadcast band in ITU Region 2, thus is generally unavailable for licensed radio operation because it may interfere with aeronautical radio navigation on 1708 kHz.

== Canada ==
- CHIM-FM says that it operates on 1710 kHz at Timmins, Ontario.

There may be other radio stations that use this frequency for tourist information, traffic, LPAM, unlicensed pirate radio stations, or temporarily for special events.

== United States ==
- Travelers' information station WQFG689 is the only station licensed on 1710 in the US; it is licensed to the government of Hudson County, New Jersey.
- Low-powered "Part 15" relay of KHMV-LP in Half Moon Bay, California (does not require a license)
- In 2010, an illegal unlicensed radio station in Portland, Oregon, was reported to have used this frequency.
- In Solano County, there is a Travis Air Force Base Radio in Fairfield, California.
