= 1670 AM =

AM radio frequency

The following radio stations broadcast on AM frequency 1670 kHz: 1670 AM is a Regional broadcast frequency.

== Argentina ==
- Basilio in Buenos Aires

== Canada ==
- CJEU (AM) in Gatineau, Quebec - 1 kW, transmitter located at 45.4829°N 75.6844°W

== Mexico ==
- XEANAH-AM in Huixquilucan, State of Mexico
- XECSCA-AM in Tarandacuao, Guanajuato
- XEFCR-AM in Reynosa, Tamaulipas

== United States ==
All stations operate with 10 kW during the daytime and are Class B stations.

Call sign	City of license	Facility ID	Nighttime power (kW)	Transmitter coordinates
KHPY	Moreno Valley, California	87156	9	34.011667°N 117.184167°W
KQMS	Redding, California	87171	1	40.558611°N 122.33°W
WMGE	Dry Branch, Georgia	87110	1	32.804444°N 83.604444°W
WOZN	Madison, Wisconsin	87154	1	43.025278°N 89.396111°W

== See also ==
- AM expanded band
- List of AM Expanded Band station assignments issued by the Federal Communications Commission on March 17, 1997
