= XEANAH-AM =

Radio station in Huixquilucan, State of Mexico, serving Mexico City

- Huixquilucan, State of Mexico; Mexico
- Broadcast area: Mexico City
- Frequency: 1670 AM
- Branding: Radio Anáhuac

Programming
- Format: University radio

Ownership
- Owner: Anahuac University Network; (Productora y Difusora Universitaria, A.C.)

History
- First air date: January 20, 2011
- Call sign meaning: Universidad Anahuac

Technical information
- Licensing authority: CRT
- Class: C
- Power: 1 kW
- Transmitter coordinates: 19°24′14.7″N 99°15′46.3″W

Links
- Webcast: Listen live
- Website: anahuac.mx

XEANAH-AM is a radio station in Huixquilucan, State of Mexico, Mexico and is the radio station of the Anahuac University Network. It broadcasts on 1670 AM from studios on the university campus.

The station began AM transmissions on January 20, 2011, though it had existed as an Internet radio station since 2004.
