= XECSCGU-AM =

Radio station in Guachochi, Chihuahua, Mexico

- Guachochi, Chihuahua; Mexico
- Frequency: 1620 AM
- Branding: Creo Radio

Programming
- Format: Christian radio Community radio

Ownership
- Owner: Centro de Rehabilitación El Olivo, A.C.

History
- First air date: 2020
- Call sign meaning: Concesión Social Comunitaria, Guachochi

Technical information
- Licensing authority: CRT
- Class: B
- Power: 1,000 watts

Links
- Webcast: Listen live

XECSCGU-AM is a community radio station on 1620 AM in Guachochi, Chihuahua, Mexico. The station is owned by the civil association Centro de Rehabilitación El Olivo, A.C., and is known as Creo Radio, airing Christian programming.

XECSCGU-AM is the first Mexican station on 1620 kHz.

== History ==
The concession for XECSCGU-AM was awarded March 20, 2019.
