= Hellenic Radio (Australia) =

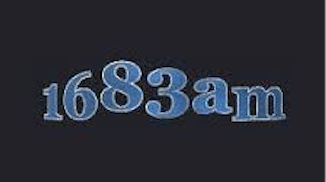
- Australia
- Broadcast area: Sydney and Melbourne
- Frequencies: AM: 1683 kHz Sydney; AM: 1422 kHz Melbourne
- Branding: 1683am

Programming
- Language: Greek
- Format: Music and talk and advertisements

Ownership
- Owner: Kostas Nikolis

History
- First air date: 1983; 43 years ago

Links
- Website: 1683amgreekradio.com

The Hellenic Radio (Australia) is a Greek language radio station based in Marrickville, which broadcasts its programs in Sydney and Melbourne, Australia. It began operating officially as a Greek radio program in 1983 through the 2NBC STEREO FM community radio station. Today the Hellenic Radio is broadcast in Sydney on the 1683 kHz AM frequency and in Melbourne on 1422 kHz.

Shows such as Skai 100.3 and RIK Triton are rebroadcast, as well as local programs. The Hellenic radio station also advertises community news and events.

The station is owned and operated by Kostas Nikolis. It aims to continue to develop and preserve the Hellenic language, culture and community amongst the Australian Hellenic community today.

== History ==
The introduction of non-English Australian radio was inspired by the influx of immigration of ethnic communities to Australia after the Second World War, post-1945.

The Hellenic Radio (Australia) was established during June 1975 as a 2NBC Greek community segment, for non-English speaking Australians. Its formation came a decade after the Australian Broadcasting Control Board had approved for 10% of Australian radio broadcasting time to be in non-English languages. On the 16th of March 1983, the Hellenic Radio station formally began operating as a Greek radio program under the 2NBC STEREO FM community radio station.

The stations broadcasting is conducted through its Sydney and Melbourne studios using locally owned radio transmitters as well as through satellites.

=== Radio Frequency ===
Broadcasting was originally conducted for the first few years of operations as a 24-hour radio station using the 67kHz sub carrier operating on LF (Low Frequency) on the Australian radio-frequency spectrum. In the following years the Hellenic Radio (Australia) station shifted to VHF (Very High Frequency) under the release of HI-BAND FM (150–170MHz) from the Australian Communication Authority.

From 1996, the Hellenic Radio (Australia) continues to utilise HI-BAND FM, in addition to the MF (Medium Frequency) of 1,683kHz MW to broadcast its programs.

== Current ==
Currently in Australia, the ethnic radio broadcasting sector continues to align with the expanding ethnic landscape seeing an average airtime for ethnic radio stations in Australia at around 2,000 hours per week, including over 100 languages.

Today, with the use of broadcasting channels, the Hellenic Radio (Australia) has broadcast to around 85% of Australia. Particularly from the Sydney studio where radio broadcasting coverage reaches an approximate radius distance of 100km into the surrounding areas. Currently, in addition to the station being broadcast using radio-frequency channels, the Hellenic Radio is also accessible online on the '1683 Greek Radio' website.

== Programming ==
The Hellenic Radio (Australia) is broadcast in the Greek language.

It has a simple format of programming for its Monday to Sunday, 24-hour broadcasting. The station caters to the interests of the community which it targets, the Greek Australiancommunity.

The Hellenic Radio broadcasting is centred on Greek music, spanning from traditional Greek folk music all the way to contemporary Greek music.

In addition, the station also provides coverage for local, national and international news in addition to community issues. And is a wide platform for advertisements both locally and internationally.

=== Rebroadcasting ===
Programs are also rebroadcast on the Hellenic Radio (Australia). For example, Skai 100.3 radio which broadcasts Greek news, sports, culture and comedy, in addition to RIK Triton which provides information and entertainment in both the Cypriot and Greek.

=== Program Contributions ===
The Hellenic Radio (Australia) utilised its programming for its advertising and running of the Emergency Relief Fund Fire Appeal radio-marathon in February 2020, which raised over $25,000 for Australian bushfire relief.

"We call upon all Hellenism, known for its charity, to contribute to this effort, with its mighty, noble donation, to support our fellow humans affected by the recent deadly and devastating fires”.

Additionally, its radio programs in 2021, provided the Greek non-English speaking audience in Australia to provide assistance and guidance surrounding the COVID-19 pandemic with Dr Nicholas Lelos.

The radio station is also a contributor towards the Australian Cancer Research Foundation.

== Programs ==
=== Radio ===
The Sydney and Melbourne broadcasts on the 1683kHz AM day and night frequencies include the popular programs:

- 'Η ΕΚΠΟΜΠΗ' – "GREEKS TODAY"
- 'Η ΕΚΠΟΜΠΗ' – "ΟRDER OF AHEPA"
- 'Η ΕΚΠΟΜΠΗ ΤΑ ΑΙΓΑΙΟΠΕΛΑΓΙΤΙΚΑ'
- 'Η ΕΛΛΗΝΙΚΗ ΟΡΘΟΔΟΞΗ'
- 'Η ΩΡΑ ΤΗΣ ΛΗΜΝΟΥ'
- 'ΘΡΗΣΚΕΥΤΙΚΟ ΠΡΟΓΡΑΜΜΑ'
- 'ΚΕΦΙ ΚΑΙ ΜΠΑΛΑ'
- 'ΛΑΙΚΑ'
- ΄ΛΙΓΟ ΑΠ ΟΛΑ'
- 'ΜΑΓΚΑΖΙΝΟ ΠΟΙΚΙΛΗΣ ΥΛΗΣ'
- 'ΜΟΥΣΙΚΗ ΚΑΙ ΤΡΑΓΟΥΔΙΑ'
- 'ΠΡΟΓΡΑΜΜΑ ΘΡΗΣΚΕΥΤΙΚΟΥ ΠΕΡΙΕΧΟΜΕΝΟΥ'
- 'ΡΙΚ ΤΡΙΤΟ ΜΠΟΓΡΑΜΜΑ'
- 'ΤΟ ΔΙΚΟ ΜΟΥ ΚΑΡΑΒΑΝΙ'
- 'ΧΟΡΕΨΤΕ ΓΙΑΤΙ ΧΑΝΟΜΑΣΤΕ'

=== News Media ===
The 24/7 radio provides news on current Greek and Australian politics, sports and economics from popular newspapers:

==== Politics ====
- 'Η ΚΑΘΗΜΕΡΙΝΗ'
- 'On Time'
- 'ΤΑ ΝΕΑ'

==== Sports ====
- 'ΑΘΛΗΤΙΚΗ ΩΡΑ'
- 'METROSPORT'
- 'ΠΑΤΡΙΣ Sport'
- 'SportDAY'
- 'FORZA Plus'
- 'ΦΩΣ ΤΩΝ ΣΠΟΡ'

==== Business & Economics ====
- 'ΔΗΜΟΠΡΑΣΙΑΚΗ ΑΘΗΝΩΝ'
- 'ΕΦΗΜΕΡΙΣ ΔΗΜΟΠΡΑΣΙΩΝ'
- 'Η ΝΑΥΤΕΜΠΟΡΙΚΗ'
- 'ΟΙΚΟΝΟΜΙΚΗ'
- 'ONE VOICE'

== Hellensim in Australia ==
The Hellenic Radio commenced during the second period of Greek community broadcasting in Australia, seeking to preserve and upkeep the Greek language, culture and community through the radio programs.

"The Greek Australian generations... threatened even more unless their language is preserved as an important bridge not only in communication but in keeping their culture alive."

The station assists in connecting Australian Greek communities and maintaining identity, language and culture. Along with this, the radio is generated generally towards more of the older Hellenic generation age groups, however not limited to these.

"Greek music is of various kinds of forms and is as celebrated as much as the country's history... It is a big part of greek culture and usually comes in the form of either greek traditional music intended for dancing to at parties and festivals, or as byzantine music which is used more in ceremonial occasions and religious contexts."

Programs on the 1683am station aid both the non-English speaking Greeks and English-speaking Greeks in Australia to maintain community, particularly through the hosting and advertising of local (Sydney and Melbourne) Greek events.

== See also ==
- Hellenism
- Greek Australians
- Greek music
- 2NBC
- Radio Stations in Australia
