= Sonshine (Australian radio station) =

Radio station in Perth, Western Australia

Sonshine (6SON)
- Perth, Western Australia; Australia
- Frequency: 98.5 MHz

Programming
- Format: Contemporary Christian music

Ownership
- Owner: Good News Broadcasters Inc

History
- First air date: 26 January 1988

Technical information
- Licensing authority: ACMA
- ERP: 15.994 kW
- Transmitter coordinates: 32°0′30.05″S 116°5′2.94″E

Links
- Public licence information: Profile
- Website: www.sonshine.com.au

Sonshine (98.5 MHz, call sign 6SON) is a non-profit community, Christian radio station in Perth, Western Australia. It provides a mix of adult contemporary mainstream and Christian news, music, and a mix of shows and segments with community guests. Sonshine plays music from Christian and mainstream artists covering current hits as well as music from the 1980s, 1990s and 2000s. In addition to broadcasting on FM in Perth, the station streams on its website and mobile apps. The station is a member of Good News Broadcasters Inc.

== History ==
The community-licensed station commenced broadcasting on Australia Day in January 1988. Co-founder and announcer Barry Grosser shaped the early content of the station, and remained as the General Manager for 25 years. Within three years of signing on, the station had achieved some popularity, with a weekly circulation of 90,000 listeners.

It broadcast from Morley for the first 21 years but, with the onset of digital radio broadcasting, needed to fund and build new premises. After 20 years, the station received its first round of government funding when it was awarded a A$375,000, equivalent to A$520,300 in 2022, Federal Government grant to assist in making the digital broadcasting transition. Premises were built at the end of Murray Street in Como to house new digital broadcasting equipment, studios and the former confidential phone counselling service CareLine. The station moved to its new premises in Murray Street, Como in 2009, selling off thousands of its vinyl records and CDs.

Sonshine also broadcasts in Katanning (97.3FM). Its current slogan is "Wholeheartedly Connected".

== Funding ==
As a non-profit organisation, the government places restrictions on the stations’ income potential and sponsorship support. It therefore relies on pledges, donations, subscriptions, and business sponsorship to continue. In 2015, its listeners raised funds for a A$75,000 upgraded transmitter during a "Hope for Christmas" appeal. After donors were given the chance to name the new equipment, it was nicknamed Hope.

The station holds two annual fundraising appeals each year in June and November. In November 2020 it exceeded its A$198,000 target over a five-day "Hope Worth Sharing" appeal, broadcast from the Studio foyer with Perth public figures.
