= XECSCA-AM =

Radio station in Tarandacuao, Guanajuato

- Tarandacuao, Guanajuato; Mexico
- Frequency: 1670 AM
- Branding: La Más Perrona

Programming
- Format: Community radio

Ownership
- Owner: Tarandacuao Pueblo de Abundante Agua, A.C.

History
- First air date: January 2019
- Former frequencies: 105.5 FM (as a pirate)
- Call sign meaning: (templated callsign)

Technical information
- Class: B

Links
- Webcast: Listen live
- Website: XECSCA-AM on Facebook

XECSCA-AM is a community radio station on 1670 AM in Tarandacuao, Guanajuato, Mexico. The station is owned by the civil association Tarandacuao Pueblo de Abundante Agua, A.C., and known as La Más Perrona.

== History ==
Predecessors to XECSCA operated as a pirate station on 105.5 MHz. A community station application was filed on May 8, 2017, with an AM frequency being approved on December 12, 2018.
