= 1701 AM =

AM radio frequency

The following radio stations broadcast on AM frequency 1701 kHz:

== Australia ==
- Radio Brisvaani in Brisbane, Queensland.
- Islamic Voice Radio in Melbourne, Victoria.
- Voice of Charity in Sydney, New South Wales.

== See also ==
- AM expanded band
