= Kinderling Kids Radio =

Stanmore, New South Wales; Australia
- Broadcast area: Worldwide
- Frequencies: DAB+, online

Programming
- Language: English
- Format: Children's radio, Talk
- Affiliations: ARN Media

Ownership
- Operator: Kinderling Pty Ltd.

History
- First air date: 2 June 2015

Technical information
- Transmitter coordinates: 33°51′15.12″S 151°3′54″E

Links
- Website: www.kinderling.com.au

Kinderling Kids Radio is an Australian radio station based in Stanmore, New South Wales, broadcasting content aimed at families with children aged between 0 and 7 years. It broadcasts 24 hours a day on DAB radio across Australia, and round the world via the internet and streaming applications on Android and Apple mobile devices.

== History ==
Kinderling Kids Radio was launched in Australia on 2 June 2015 by a group of parents led by Evan Kaldor. The station has expanded since its inception and is now carried on DAB+ radio across Australia and round the world on the internet. It was nominated for and won the award for "Best Digital Radio Format" at the Australian Commercial Radio Awards in 2016.

In 2017, Kinderling acquired the parenting website babyology.com.au. In doing so, it created a new digital media company called "The Parent Brand" under the control of the station's founder Evan Kaldor, who took on the role of CEO. The Parent Brand aimed to provide written, audio and video content across both outlets.

Later that year, in association with Qantas, Kinderling launched 3 in-flight radio channels for children, "Ready, Jet, Go", "Settle Petal" and "Sleepy Time", all of which were made accessible from passenger seat consoles.

In July 2018, the station also partnered with Amazon's Alexa application, making two children's skills available for users in Australia and New Zealand; "Bedtime Explorers" and "Kinderling Kids News with Groovy Ruby".

As of 4 June 2019, Kinderling has 21.68% of the Digital/Internet Only audience share across Sydney.

== Content ==
The station features a wide range of content such as varying styles of music, stories, meditation and relaxation aids, external programming from CBeebies and other providers, and sleep aids. There is also a parenting podcast called "Feed Play Love".

== Schedule ==
Between 6 am and 8 pm daily, programming is scheduled in 1-, 2- or 3-hour blocks. From 8 pm to 6 am, the station carries a 10-hour track of selected music to aid children in getting to sleep.

=== Weekdays ===
6 AM to 7 AM	I'm Awake	
7 AM to 9 AM	Start Your Engines	
9 AM to 12 PM	Gather Round With Groovy Ruby	Also includes: Play And Learn (10 AM to 11 AM); Little Lunch (11 AM to 12 PM)
1 PM to 3 PM	Radio Playground	
3 PM to 5 PM	Pick Me Up	
5 PM to 8 PM	Settle Petal	
8 PM to 6 AM	Sleepy Soundtrack	

=== Saturday ===
6 AM to 8 AM	I'm Awake
8 AM to 10 AM	We Are The Champions
10 AM to 12PM	Birthday Party
12 PM to 1 PM	Retro Rewind
1 PM to 3 PM	We Are Family
3 PM to 5 PM	Digital Disco
5 PM to 8 PM	Settle Petal
8 PM to 6 AM	Sleepy Soundtrack

=== Sunday ===
6 AM to 8 AM	I'm Awake
8 AM to 10 AM	Kids In The Kitchen
10 AM to 12 PM	Sunday Headspace
12 PM to 1 PM	Retro Rewind
1 PM to 3 PM	We Are Family
3 PM to 5 PM	Digital Disco
5 PM to 8 PM	Settle Petal
8 PM to 6 AM	Sleepy Soundtrack
