= 2NBC =

Community radio station in Kogarah, Sydney, Australia

Coordinates: 33.9525°S 151.0647°E

- Australia
- Broadcast area: South & Inner West Sydney
- Frequency: 90.1 MHz

Programming
- Language: Variety
- Format: Community radio

Ownership
- Owner: Narwee Baptist Community Broadcasters Ltd

Links
- Website: 901nbcfm.com.au

2NBC FM is a community radio station based in Kogarah, Sydney. Its broadcast area is the suburbs in the south and inner west of Sydney covering the area known as St George. This includes the municipalities of Canterbury, Hurstville, Rockdale, and Kogarah.

NBC FM is a volunteer-run organisation and is funded through listener support, grants and limited commercial sponsorship. The station celebrated its 30th anniversary in 2013.

== History ==
2NBC was formed in 1974 by a group of local residents and the Narwee Baptist Church, interested in the idea of a community radio station. After test broadcasts in the early 1980s the group was granted a licence by the then Australian Broadcasting Tribunal to provide a community broadcast service to the south and inner west suburbs of Sydney. Although 2NBC was spearheaded by the team from Narwee Baptist Church, the station has always been managed and programmed independently to the church.

== Current ==
In 2008 the City of Hurstville and 2NBC teamed up to record The Tales from Dragonhurst, a local history radio drama. Funded by the Australia Council for the Arts the production involved a cast and crew of 30 seniors and an orchestra. Eight episodes were recorded and broadcast and the series has been made available to all community radio stations in Australia.

== Programming ==
2NBC does not have a single format or style of programming but has many formats which can change almost hourly, catering for a variety of interests within the local community. As well as coverage of local news and community issues, music programming ranges from jazz, country, easy listening to music from the 1950s through to the 1990s. Programs are also broadcast in a variety of languages other than English. These include programs in Arabic, Mandarin, Macedonian, Cantonese, Greek, Spanish and Nepali.

== See also ==
- List of radio stations in Australia
