= 2moro Radio =

Australian radio station

Coordinates: 33.867139°S 151.207114°E

2MORO is one of two full-time Arabic language radio stations in Sydney, Australia. It is broadcast locally on 1620 AM and has a national coverage through MySat Pay TV network.

The radio station is also identified as "Sawt El-Ghad" (Arabic: صوت الغد). In February 2006, Tony Ishak, represented the station at the Australian Lebanese Foundation scholarship presentation.
