= Hope 103.2 =

Radio station in Sydney

- Australia
- Broadcast area: Sydney

Programming
- Format: Christian Radio

Ownership
- Owner: Hope Media Ltd, formerly Christian Broadcasting Association Ltd
- Sister stations: Inspire by Hope 103.2, formerly Inspire Digital

History
- Call sign meaning: 2 = New South Wales Christian Broadcasting Association

Technical information
- ERP: 50,000 watts
- HAAT: 204 m

Links
- Webcast: Live Stream
- Website: http://hope1032.com.au

Hope 103.2 is a Christian Radio station in Sydney, Australia, transmitting on the FM dial at 103.2 MHz. Founded as 2CBA by the Rev. Vernon Turner, it commenced broadcasting on 5 March 1979 as one of the first community radio stations and cemented itself as Australia's first Christian FM radio station. Its mission is "To impact people with experiences of God’s love so that they may become more like Christ and the world more like the Kingdom".

The station provides a mixed format of Christian, easy listening and hot adult contemporary music. Station programming also features competitions, listener interaction, as well as short and extended Christian devotionals.

Sister station Inspire Digital (now known as Inspire by Hope 103.2) was the first Australian community radio station launched on DAB+ in 2010.

The radio station relocated from 420 Lyons Road in Five Dock to its current studios in Seven Hills (the former home of WSFM) and was renamed FM103.2 in 2002, with the tag-line "The Heart of Sydney". The station was renamed Heart 103.2 in December 2007, but this was challenged legally by Macquarie Regional Radioworks who held a generic right to the name "Heart". It was decided to use "Sydney's 1032" as the interim on-air identifier for 2008.

On Monday, 15 December 2008 at midnight the station was renamed "Hope 103.2". Listeners offered their suggestions for a new name for the station, and "Hope" was judged the best and most popular.

== History ==
Hope FM began broadcasting initially as 2CBA FM 103.2, "all beautiful music", in 1979, whose format was continuous easy listening music, mixed with Christian news and messages. During this period, much of the music played included James Last, Eric Jupp, Richard Clayderman, Klaus Wunderlich, and other similar sounding artists. Many of these tracks were instrumental versions of more popular hits of the '50s, '60s, '70s, and '80s. The station ceased this style of programming during late 1999 in favour of the current format.

== Programming ==
The format of Hope 103.2 is described as "Contemporary Christian Radio", which is Christian-infused mainstream light contemporary radio. The program format is designed to reach out to the wider community as well as the Christian community. This is achieved with "family friendly" and accessible music with a positive or relational message, whether performed by Christian or non-Christian artists and regardless of whether or not the music is intentionally carrying a Christian message. This is in contrast to other christian radio stations in Australia, where only contemporary Christian artists are played.

=== Devotionals ===
Every hour a short radio devotional, described on their website as a Ministry Segment, is played on air. During the day, short 60 second programs from Focus on the Family, Berni Dymet, Heidi Wysman and City Bible Forum are played. Before and after the breakfast show on weekdays, longer 5 minute devotionals are presented including Time with God with John North and Morning Devotions with Chris Witts. On Sunday mornings, a sermon from Anglican Minister Simon Manchester is played.

=== News Programming ===
Hope Media launched their newsroom in December 2019, with their news coverage focused on the Sydney metro area. This news service provides hourly news bulletins on-air and online. This service is still supplemented by bulletins supplied by 2GB and Nine Radio on weekend.

Prior to their news service launch, radio bulletins were presented by 2GB and 2UE (Nine Radio), which rebranded from Macquarie Radio Network in early 2020. Between July 2008 and December 2020, Hope 103.2 also broadcast live simulcasts of Nine News (via Channel Nine Sydney), airing every night except Saturdays, at 6:00 pm. Nine News & 9news.com.au were also occasional sponsors of Hope 1032 News.

=== Podcasts ===
Other programing from Hope has been moved to online Podcasts. Their Podcast shows have included a Book club, interviews, advice on raising families, and stories on hope. Their more in-depth devotions have also moved to podcasts.

=== Open House ===
Open House was a live talk show exploring life, faith and culture from a Christian perspective. It aired Sundays from 7pm to 10pm on Hope 103.2 and was syndicated to other radio stations across Australia. From April 2006 to March 2011, the show was hosted by Sheridan Voysey. Between April 2011 until December 2013, Open House was hosted by TV and radio broadcaster Leigh Hatcher.

In 2014 Dwayne Jeffries hosted Open House weekdays at 12pm.

From 2017, Stephen O'Doherty returned with the show on Sunday evenings. The show did not return in 2019.

=== Digital Radio ===
Hope 103.2 also broadcasts digitally online and via Sydney DAB+ Radio. The station also broadcasts three other digital Radio stations, all of which have no live presenters:

- Inspire by Hope 103.2 (formerly Inspire Digital) – began in November 2010 on both Sydney DAB+ Radio and online. Provides Christian music and teaching.
- FRESH Radio – Online only. The station airs christian music for a youth audience.
- Christmas Hope – Online only, and DAB+ in November and December each year. The station runs Christmas and Advent music across the year.

== Board & Management ==
Hope Media Ltd is governed by a board of directors. Directors are elected according to the organisation's constitution, by members of the organisation. Directors are appointed for a term of three years, and are eligible for re-election for up to four consecutive terms. Stephen O'Doherty became chairperson of the board in 2005, and David Bartlett succeeded him as chairman of the board in May 2023.

Phillip Randall, previously CEO of 98five Sonshine FM, Perth, has been CEO of Hope Media Ltd since 1999. Other managers include:

- Dwayne Jeffries – General Manager
- David Barker – Chief Financial Officer
- Jodie Williams – People and Culture Manager
- Justin Kendall – Community Relations Manager
- Ramona Ishac – Group Sponsorship Sales Manager
- Stephen Wilkinson – Technical Operations Manager

== Relationship with other Christian Media ==
Hope Media has long been associated with other Christian media ministries, both formally and informally. As members of Christian Media and Arts Australia, they have often contributed to and participated in sector-wide projects.

Hope Media has also entered into agreements to manage other Christian Community Radio Stations. In 2016, Hope Media became the sole Trustee Member of Family Radio Limited (licensee of 96five Brisbane). This trustee membership allows Hope Media to appoint the majority of board directors, with Community Members able to vote for the minority of board positions.

In 2019, Hope Media became the sole Co-Mission Member of Sunshine Coast Christian Broadcasters Ltd (licensees of 4CLG Salt 106.5), entitling them to the majority of board positions. Since 2022, Hope Media has been the Co-Mission Member of Juice Media Ltd (licensee of Juice107.3). This entitles them to at least one board seat.

== See also ==
- Dan Widdowson, former breakfast presenter
- List of radio stations in Australia
