= Jimmy Smith (rugby league) =

Australian rugby league footballer (born 1971)

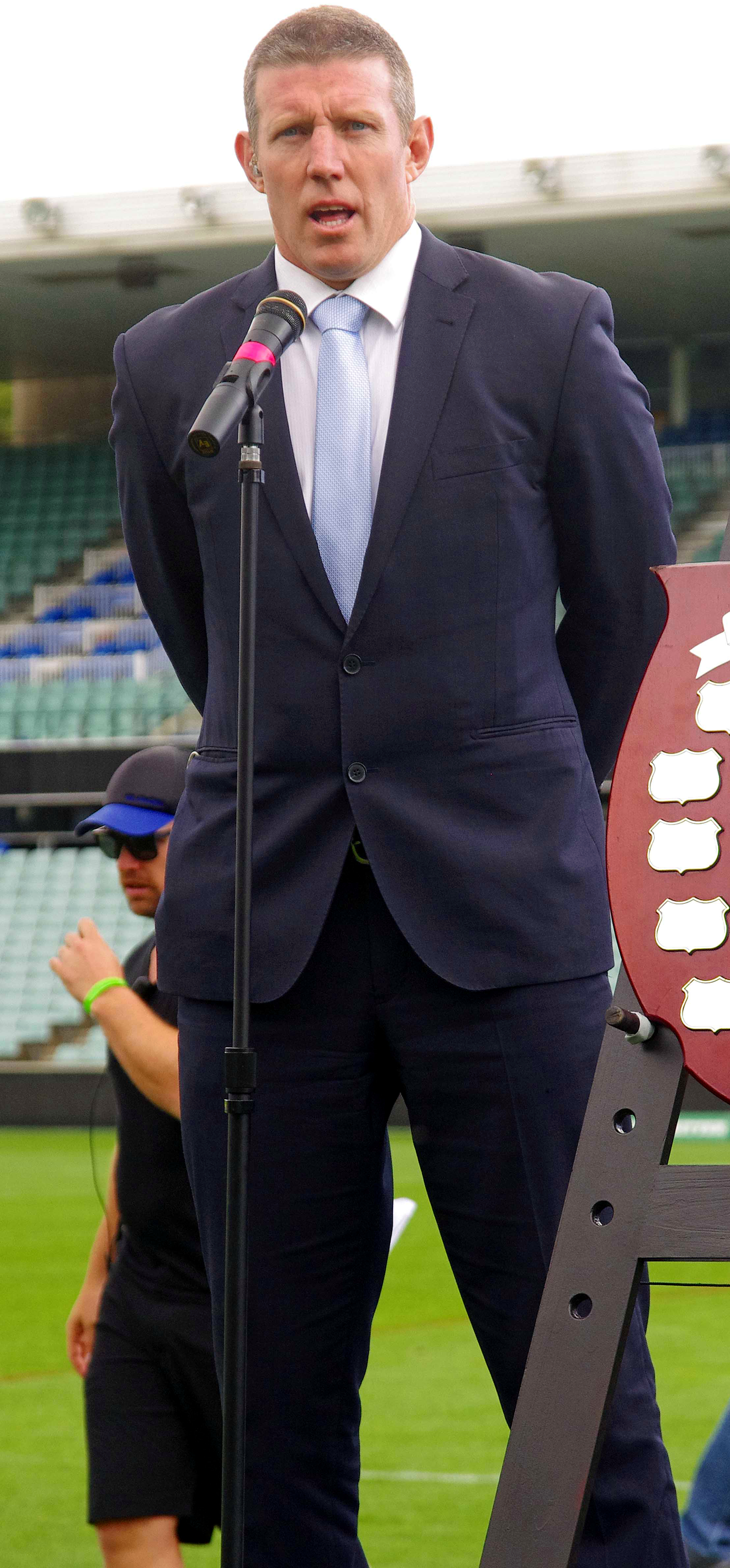

Personal information
- Full name: James Smith
- Born: 25 October 1971 (age 54) Young, New South Wales, Australia

Playing information
- Position: Second-row, Prop
Club
| Years | Team | Pld | T | G | FG | P |
|---|---|---|---|---|---|---|
| 1992–96 | Eastern Suburbs | 58 | 3 | 0 | 0 | 12 |
| 1997 | Western Suburbs | 15 | 0 | 0 | 0 | 0 |
| 1998–99 | South Sydney | 47 | 7 | 0 | 0 | 28 |
| 2000 | Salford City Reds | 28 | 7 | 0 | 0 | 28 |
| | Total | 148 | 17 | 0 | 0 | 68 |
- Source: As of 24 December 2016

Jimmy Smith (born 25 October 1971) is an Australian former professional rugby league footballer who played as a second-row and prop in the 1990s and 2000s.

He played for the Eastern Suburbs, the Western Suburbs and the South Sydney Rabbitohs in the Winfield Cup, ARL and NRL. He also played in the Super League for the Salford City Reds.

== Background ==
Smith was born in Young, New South Wales.

== Career ==
After his retirement from playing Smith was kept on by the Rabbitohs in the role of media liaison officer.

Smith has since moved into the media and works for Fox Sports as a pundit and commentator. He also works in radio for SEN 1170 Sydney, hosting the show “Afternoons with Jimmy Smith” from 12-3 pm Monday to Friday. Jimmy also commentates on numerous sporting events across the SEN Network, from NRL, AFL, Supercars, to NBL as well.

Smith studied for an Agricultural Economics degree at Sydney University.
