= Smooth FM =

Australian radio network

- Australia
- Broadcast area: Australia
- Frequencies: 95.3 MHz in Sydney; 91.5 MHz in Melbourne; DAB+ in Brisbane, Adelaide, and Perth
- Branding: Smooth 95.3 & Smooth 91.5; Smooth (Brisbane, Adelaide, and Perth)

Programming
- Language: English
- Format: Soft AC/MOR
- Affiliations: Nova FM

Ownership
- Owner: Nova Entertainment

History
- First air date: Sydney: 1 August 2005 (Vega); 21 May 2012 (smoothfm); Melbourne: 5 September 2005 (as Vega); 21 May 2012 (smoothfm)

Technical information
- ERP: Sydney: 150 kW; Melbourne: 56 kW

Links
- Website: Network: smoothfm Sydney: smoothfm 95.3; Melbourne: smoothfm 91.5

Smooth FM is an Australian commercial radio network owned and operated by Nova Entertainment. From original launch in 2012, The format was focused on providing 'more music and less talk' along with an eclectic easy-listening playlist, usually featuring ballads. From Valentine's Day in February 2020, the station revised genres when the primary channel became an adult contemporary radio station.

== History ==
=== Vega ===
Vega launched in 2005 to target the baby boomer market of listeners in the 40 to 60 age bracket, with a mix of talk and music from the 1960s to the 2000s. The positioning statement for the network was "On your wavelength" with a blue squiggle and sign wave as the logo.

The network first launched in August 2005 in Sydney and September 2005 in Melbourne along with announcers Angela Catterns, Denise Scott, Shaun Micallef, Beverley O'Connor, Wendy Harmer, Francis Leach, Wilbur Wilde, Tony Squires, Rebecca Wilson and Mike Perso.

To coincide with the station's positioning statement the first song played at the launch was Van Morrison's Wavelength.

Vega's stations had failed to attract a significant audience with the Sydney station reaching a 1.8 percent audience share, and the Melbourne station gained a 1.2 percent share, placing it second last (ahead only of ABC NewsRadio) and last out of surveyed stations in each market, respectively. However, station management state that the slow take-up was to be expected, claiming the target audience will be slower than some audience groups to try a new station.

In June 2006 the Sydney and Melbourne stations stopped sharing programmes. Both stations dropped their "40 years of music" slogan and moved drive-time hosts Rebecca Wilson and Tony Squires to share the Sydney breakfast slot with former host Angela Catterns. The changes were slow to grow market share, with the Sydney audience falling to 1.7% in Sydney (No. 6, 2006, but climbing slowly to 1.8% in Melbourne, which, at the time, was their highest audience share to date in Melbourne.

By the end of 2006, Vega had increased their ratings share in both cities and the Sydney station reached 2.8%, while the Melbourne station reached 3%.

In January 2007, Vega expanded its "Vega Variety" positioner to include "the '70s, and '80s and the best new songs", and also put out advertisements in the form of billboards and on the side of buses, based around that expanded positioner. It was hoped that this would encourage more listeners to sample the station.

In the first radio survey of 2007, Vega in Sydney and Melbourne again both had small increases, with the Sydney station reaching 3% and the Melbourne station reaching 3.3%. The station's best demographic performer on both stations in that survey, is the 25–39 age group.

By the 4th radio survey of 2007, Vega in Sydney and Melbourne had gone over the 4% mark, with the Sydney station rating 4.6% and the Melbourne station rating 4.4%. In the 40–54 age group, Vega in Sydney was the second highest rating FM station in that age group after classic hits station WS-FM, who, traditionally, have been the highest rating FM station in that age group.

In the 5th radio survey of 2008, Vega in Sydney had surpassed the 5% mark for the first time, rating very closely behind main rival FM stations Triple M & WS-FM. Included during 2008 was the Sunday Session with Mark Gable as host. The station also became the highest rating FM station in the 40–54 age group, knocking WS-FM off that position.

On the 6th radio survey of 2009, Vega in Sydney and Melbourne reached up to 6% mark in the 55+ age group.

=== Classic Rock ===
In March 2010, Vega was rebranded under the name Classic Rock after failing to gain a significant audience low ratings. The rebrand occurred on Friday 12 March 2010 with the station competing against rivals Gold 104.3/101.7 WSFM and Triple M.

Classic Rock was a minimalist announcer station which featured local Breakfast programs with Maroon in Sydney and Ian "Dicko" Dickson and Dave O'Neil in Melbourne and music orientated programs Cover to Cover with Barry Bissell and the American Nights with Alice Cooper.

In July 2010, Dickson and O'Neil were fired from the ailing station due to cost-cutting measures and Classic Rock just played continuous classic rock music with regular news, weather and sport updates.

=== Smooth FM ===
On 21 May 2012, the network relaunched as v in Sydney and Melbourne, with Michael Bublé as the face of the network.

In February 2013, Smooth FM extended broadcasting nationally on DAB+ to Brisbane, Perth and Adelaide.

In April 2018, it was announced that Sam Smith would replace Michael Bublé as the face of the network.

In 2019, Smooth FM launched two new digital only stations: Smooth Relax and Smooth Chill.

On 16 February 2020, Smooth FM was relaunched as an adult contemporary station for their primary channels with a revised playlist shown as a result the network's motto ‘your easy place to relax‘ becomes ‘your feel good station’, with Robbie Williams as the new face of the network.

In September 2022, Smooth FM extended live and local content in Brisbane, Adelaide and Perth. Breakfast will be hosted by broadcasters, Kate Mac in Perth, Nick Michaels in Brisbane and Kelly Golding in Adelaide, providing local connection and content for listeners in these states. Smooth also Rebranded Smooth Chill with Smooth Vintage, Playing the Classic Hits of the 60's and 70's while Smooth 80's Plays 80's Music and Smooth Relax remains with a Soft Adult Contemporary Format.

== Stations ==
Callsign	Frequency	Branding	Location
2PTV	95.3 MHz FM	Smooth 95.3	Sydney, New South Wales
3PTV	91.5 MHz FM	Smooth 91.5	Melbourne, Victoria
N/A	DAB+	Smooth FM Brisbane	Brisbane, Queensland
N/A	DAB+	Smooth FM Adelaide	Adelaide, South Australia
N/A	DAB+	Smooth FM Perth	Perth, Western Australia
N/A	DAB+	Smooth Relax	Sydney and Melbourne
N/A	DAB+	Smooth Vintage	Sydney and Melbourne
N/A	DAB+	Smooth 80s	Adelaide

== Television channel ==
Foxtel Smooth (formerly Smooth) was an 18-hour (originally 24 hours) Australian pay television music channel available via Foxtel satellite and cable services. It launched on 3 December 2013, dedicated to easy listening adult contemporary music. The channel ceased broadcasting on 1 July 2020.
