= DZBF =

Radio station in Metro Manila, Philippines

Radyo Marikina (DZBF)
- Marikina; Philippines
- Broadcast area: Metro Manila
- Frequency: 1674 kHz
- Branding: Radyo Marikina

Programming
- Language: Filipino
- Format: Government Radio

Ownership
- Owner: Marikina City Government Public Information Office

History
- First air date: October 1992
- Call sign meaning: Bayani Fernando

Technical information
- Licensing authority: NTC
- Power: 1,000 watts

Links
- Website: Marikina website

DZBF (1674 AM), broadcasting as Radyo Marikina is a radio station owned and operated by the Marikina City Government Public Information Office. The studio is located at the 2nd floor, Marikina City Hall, Shoe Ave., Marikina, while its transmitter is at the Engineering Center, Gil Fernando Ave. cor. Aquilina St., Marikina.

== History ==
It first went on air in October 1992 on 90.3 FM under the call letters DWPM. It moved to its current frequency sometime in 1994.

DZBF used to carry the branding Del Radio during Del de Guzman's stint as Mayor of the city from 2010 to 2016.
