= 2MM =

Coordinates: 33°54′17.5″S 151°7′56.5″E

2MM Greek Radio

Australia
- Broadcast area: Sydney, Wollongong
- Frequencies: 1665 kHz AM Sydney; Darwin 1656 kHz AM; 99.3 mHz FM Wollongong

Programming
- Format: Greek language programming

Ownership
- Owner: Mars Broadcasting Pty Ltd

History
- First air date: 1996

2MM is a narrowcast radio station based in the Sydney suburb of Dulwich Hill. 2MM broadcasts a Greek language service to Sydney and Wollongong.

== See also ==
- List of radio stations in Australia
