= Radio Austral =

Australia
- Broadcast area: Sydney and Canberra
- Frequencies: 87.8 MHz FM Sydney; 88.0 MHz FM Canberra

Programming
- Format: Spanish language programming

Ownership
- Owner: Carmen carle quintero

Radio Austral is an FM radio station based in Fairfield

The station can be heard between North Sydney and Campbelltown on 87.8 MHz.

Editor and Director in Chief is Eduardo Mariano Gonzalez Cristobal

== See also ==
- List of radio stations in Australia
