= 2ME Radio Arabic =

Arabic language radio station based in Parramatta, Australia

Coordinates: 33.8170°S 151.0035°E

- Australia
- Broadcast area: Sydney and Melbourne
- Frequencies: 1638 kHz AM; 1647 kHz AM; 1656 kHz AM

Programming
- Format: Arabic language programming, Classic Hits/Top 40

History
- First air date: 25 October 1996

Links
- Website: 2ME

2ME Radio Arabic is a narrowcast Arabic language radio station based in Parramatta, Sydney, broadcasting on 1638AM to Sydney, Melbourne, Hobart and Darwin; 1647AM to Brisbane and Adelaide; and 1656AM to Perth and Canberra.

== History ==
2ME is Australia's first 24-hour commercially owned Arabic-language radio station. Transmission began in Sydney in 1996 and in Melbourne in 1998.

The company also supplies Arabic programming for the in-flight entertainment service on Royal Brunei Airlines and Gulf Air.

== Programming ==
The station features Arabic and English language music following both a Classic Hits and Top 40 format. 2ME broadcasts local and national news along with BBC World News on the hour. The programming day is broken into traditional shifts with an emphasis on talkback and listener participation during the day. Evening programs concentrate on music and live concerts.

== See also ==
- List of radio stations in Australia
