= Smooth 95.3 =

Radio station in Sydney, Australia

Coordinates: 33°52′11″S 151°11′25″E

Smooth 95.3 (2PTV)
- Sydney, New South Wales; Australia
- Frequency: 95.3 MHz
- Branding: smoothfm 95.3

Programming
- Language: English
- Format: Hot AC
- Affiliations: Smooth

Ownership
- Owner: Nova Entertainment (UK Radio 1) Pty Ltd
- Sister stations: Nova 96.9

History
- First air date: 1 August 2005 (as Vega 95.3); 12 March 2010 (as Classic Rock 95.3); 21 March 2011 (as Sydney's 95.3FM); 21 May 2012 (as Smooth 95.3)
- Former names: Vega 95.3 (2005–2010); Classic Rock 95.3 (2010–2011); Sydney's 95.3FM (2011–2012)

Technical information
- Licensing authority: ACMA
- ERP: 150 kW

Links
- Public licence information: Profile
- Website: www.smoothfm.com.au/station/smooth953

Smooth 95.3 (call sign: 2PTV) is a commercial radio station based in Sydney, New South Wales, Australia. The station is owned by Nova Entertainment along with sister station Nova 96.9 and currently plays easy listening songs from the late-1950s/early-1960s to the present with a 55+ year span.

== History ==
In contrast to Nova Entertainment's other Australian radio brand, the pop/rock Nova network, Smooth 95.3 (originally named Vega and Classic Rock) was originally positioned to target the baby boomer market of listeners in the 40 to 60 age bracket, with a mix of talk and music from the 1960s to the 2000s. This changed in 2006 when it moved to a music position, scrapping the talk content. Smooth 95.3's major rivals in the Sydney market are 101.7 WSFM, KIIS 106.5 and Triple M.

During its first AC Nielsen ratings survey (No. 8, 2005, covering mid-September to November of that year), Vega 95.3 had failed to attract a significant audience, with a 1.8 percent audience share. However, station management stated that the slow take-up was to be expected, claiming the target audience would be slower than some audience groups to try a new station.

In June 2006 the station dropped its "40 years of music" slogan and moved drive-time hosts Rebecca Wilson and Tony Squires to share the breakfast slot with Angela Catterns. The changes were slow in growing market share, with the audience falling to 1.7% (No. 6, 2006).

By the end of 2006, Vega 95.3 had reached their ratings peak to that time, reaching a 2.8% share.

In January 2007, Vega 95.3 expanded its "Vega Variety" positioner to include "the 70s, 80s and the best new songs", and also put out advertisements in the form of billboards and on the side of buses, based around that expanded positioner. It was hoped that it would get more listeners to sample the station.

In the first radio survey of 2007, Vega 95.3 had small increases, reaching 3%.

Throughout 2007 and 2008, Vega 95.3 gradually grew its audience. In survey 7/2008, it finally shed its perennial position as the lowest rated commercial FM station in Sydney, passing Triple M. In survey 8/2008, its audience had increased to 5.7%. In its target age groups, it rated 4th commercial FM with 7.9% in the 25 to 39 bracket, 4th in 40 to 54 with 8.6%, and 5th in the 55+ bracket.

On 12 March 2010, Vega 95.3 ceased transmission after just five years on air and the station was replaced with Classic Rock 95.3, which included (appropriately enough) a classic rock format.

At exactly 7:00am on 21 May 2012, the station was relaunched as smoothfm 95.3 by Michael Bublé as the first on-air announcer.

In August 2015, smoothfm 95.3 was crowned the number-one FM station for the first time with an 8.2 share.

== Announcers ==
- More Music Breakfast Show with Bogart Torelli (5:30 AM to 9 AM; weekdays)
- Ty Frost (9 AM to 1 PM; weekdays), (4 PM to 9 PM; Sundays)
- Simon Diaz (1 PM to 5 PM; weekdays)
- Byron Webb (5 PM to 9 PM; Monday to Thursday), (5 PM to 7 PM; Fridays), (4 PM to 9 PM; Saturdays)
- Cameron Daddo (9 PM to 11:59 PM; daily)
- Melissa Doyle (6 AM to 10 AM; weekends)
- Richard Wilkins (10 AM to 1 PM; weekends)
- David Campbell (1 PM to 4 PM; weekends)
