= Vision Christian Radio =

Radio network in Australia

- Australia
- Frequency: AM: 1620 kHz Brisbane
- Branding: Vision Christian Radio

Programming
- Format: Christian radio

Ownership
- Owner: Vision Christian Media; (United Christian Broadcasters Australia Ltd.)
- Sister stations: V180 Radio, Vision Kids, Vision Worship

History
- First air date: 1 February 1999

Technical information
- Repeaters: AM: 1017, 1611–1665 kHz; FM: 87.6–104.5 MHz; VAST: 614; DAB+: Brisbane, Melbourne, Sydney

Links
- Webcast: Listen Live
- Website: vision.org.au/radio/

Vision Christian Radio is an Australian narrowcast radio station owned and operated by Vision Christian Media, an affiliate of United Christian Broadcasters. It broadcasts a Christian radio format of music and talk from studios in the Brisbane suburb of Springwood, to a network of more than 800 AM and FM radio frequencies.

The station first broadcast on 1 February 1999 as Vision FM, with a single transmitter located at Beaudesert, Queensland. By 2001 it had established around 40 transmission sites, and 156 by 2004. The network's growth was assisted first by the purchase of 16 High-Powered Open Narrowcast (HPON) licenses in Western Sydney in 2002, and thereafter other HPON licenses in Victoria and Western Australia.

In 2023, the Australian Communications and Media Authority (ACMA) reported that it had 875 radio transmitters across Australia in all mainland states.

In 2023 Vision Christian Radio started transmitting on DAB+ throughout Brisbane, expanding to Melbourne and Sydney in 2024. In June 2026 DAB+ was expanded to Perth with plans for futhur expansion across Australia with DAB+.

During 2023, Vision Kids was launched as a streaming only radio station that provides positive music and content to kids featuring content from Colin Buchanan, Dan Warlow and Sean W Smith.

In 2025, Vision Worship was launched as a music stream designed to uplift and inspire. Featuring powerful songs that glorify God, it helps you stay connected to Him throughout your day. Whether at home, work, or on the go, Vision Worship creates an atmosphere of praise, drawing you closer to His presence.

== Programming and availability ==
A single national programming feed is broadcast to more than 800 towns, suburbs and cities in Australia, as well as remote areas via the Viewer Access Satellite Television platform. Major centres covered include Brisbane, Western Sydney, Melbourne, Hobart, Adelaide, Perth and the Gold Coast.

The station broadcasts a mix of contemporary Christian music, messages from Christian national and international speakers and practical teaching. Vision also produces a national news service which is also syndicated to Christian community radio stations in Australia.

== Controversy ==
In 2016, following an on-air segment with American Bible teacher Chuck Missler in which he criticised the Roman Catholic Church, Vision Christian Radio was found to have breached ACMA's Code of Conduct about acknowledging and responding to written complaints. ACMA dismissed related complaints that the network had perpetuated hatred or vilification during the interview.

== V180 ==
V180 is a youth-focussed Christian radio station streaming online, as well as being broadcast on 87.6FM in St George, Queensland. Vision180 started airing on 19 October 2015, with a brand refresh to V180 in August 2022.

== Bibliography ==
- Griffen-Foley, Bridget; Horsfield, Alison M.; Horsfield, Peter (2014), "Religious broadcasting", in Griffen-Foley, Bridget (ed.), A Companion to the Australian Media, Melbourne: Australian Scholarly Publishing, pp. 411–413, ISBN 978-192500-30-55
