= List of ITV Studios programmes =

Programmes produced or distributed by ITV Studios

This is a list of programmes produced or distributed by ITV Studios, the television production company owned by the British television broadcaster ITV plc. This list includes shows from the American division with labels Tomorrow Studios and Leftfield Pictures among others and the UK division with Potato and 12 Yard.

== ITV Studios ==
Title	Network	Years	Notes
Tonight at the London Palladium	ITV	1955–69; 1973–74; 1998–2000; 2010; 2014–17	continued from ATV and LWT
What the Papers Say	ITV/Channel 4/BBC Two; BBC Radio 4	1956–2016	continued from Granada Television
Coronation Street	ITV	1960–present	continued from Granada Television
Emmerdale	ITV	1972–present	continued from Yorkshire Television
The Krypton Factor	ITV	1977–1995; 2009–2010	continued from Granada Television
Surprise Surprise	ITV	1984–2001; 2012–2015	continued from LWT
This Morning	ITV	1988–present	continued from Granada Television
Agatha Christie's Poirot	ITV	1989–2013	continued from LWT; co-production with Agatha Christie Ltd. (1989–2013), and WGBH Boston (2008–2013)
You've Been Framed!	ITV	1990–2022	continued from Granada Television
Heartbeat	ITV	1992–2010	continued from Yorkshire Television
A Touch of Frost	ITV	1992–2010	continued from Yorkshire Television; co-production with Excelsior
Jonathan Dimbleby	ITV	1994–2006	as ITV Productions; continued from LWT and Granada
Where the Heart Is	ITV	1997–2006	as ITV Productions; continued from Anglia Television and Meridian Broadcasting
The Royle Family	BBC Two/BBC One	1998–2010	continued from Granada Television
Loose Women	ITV	1999–present	continued from Granada Television and Anglia Television
Tonight	ITV	1999–present	continued from Granada Television
My Parents Are Aliens	CITV	1999–2006	continued from Yorkshire Television
TV's Naughtiest Blunders	ITV	2000–2007	continued from Carlton Television
I'm a Celebrity: Extra Camp	ITV2	2002–2019	continued from LWT
The Last Detective	ITV	2003–2007	continued from Meridian and Granada
The Royal	ITV	2003–2011	continued from Yorkshire Television
Blue Murder	ITV	2003–2009	continued from Granada Television
Animal Cops: Houston	Animal Planet	2003–2015	continued from Anglia Television
Agatha Christie's Marple	ITV	2004–2013	co-production with WGBH Boston and Agatha Christie Ltd.
The Jeremy Kyle Show	ITV	2005–2019	
Gameshow Marathon	ITV	2005–2007	co-production with Talkback Thames
The Royal Today	ITV	2008	
Who Dares, Sings!	ITV	2008	
Britannia High	CITV/TV3	2008	co-production with Globe Productions
Animal Cops: Phoenix	Animal Planet	2009–2018	
Sit Down, Shut Up	Fox	2009	co-production with Adelaide Productions, Taramount Studios, 20th Century Fox Television and Sony Pictures Television
Dive	BBC Two	2010	
3@Three	ITV	2010	
Marchlands	ITV	2011	co-production with 20th Century Fox Television
White Van Man	BBC Three	2011	
There's No Taste Like Home	ITV	2011	
High Steaks	ITV	2011	co-production with Escalate Television
Text Santa	ITV	2011–2015	
White Heat	BBC Two	2012	miniseries
Titanic	ITV; Global	2012	miniseries; co-production with Deep Indigo, Sienna Films, Mid Atlantic Films and Lookout Point
Superstar	ITV	2012	
Mrs Biggs	ITV; Seven Network	2012	co-production with December Media
Mr. Selfridge	ITV; PBS	2013–2016	co-production with Masterpiece
Lightfields	ITV	2013	co-production with 20th Century Fox Television
Celebrity Super Spa	Channel 5	2013	co-production with GroupM Entertainment
Judge Rinder	ITV	2014–present	
Who's Doing the Dishes?	ITV	2014–2016	
Chasing Shadows	ITV	2014	Miniseries
Cilla	ITV	2014	co-production with GroupM Entertainment
Thunderbirds Are Go	CITV	2015–2020	co-production with Pukeko Pictures
One Hundred and Eighty	Sky One	2015	
Jekyll and Hyde	ITV	2015	
Beowulf	ITV	2016	
Jericho	ITV	2016	
Judge Rinder's Crime Stories	ITV	2016–present	
Top Class	CBBC	2016–2020	
Meet the Parents	ITV	2016	
Tutankhamun	ITV	2016	Miniseries
Yes Chef	BBC One	2016–present	
Harlots	ITV Encore/StarzPlay; Hulu	2017–2019	co-production with Monumental Pictures
Robozuna	CITV	2018–2019	co-production with KidsCave Entertainment
Hatton Garden	ITV	2019	
The Trouble with Maggie Cole	ITV	2020–present	co-production with Genial Productions
The Ipcress File	ITV	2022	co-production with Altitude Television
Ralph & Katie	BBC One	2022–present	co-production with Tiger Aspect Productions and Keshet Productions

=== Granada Productions ===
Title	Years	Network	Notes
The Army Game	1957–1961	ITV	
Criss Cross Quiz	1957–1967	ITV	
Concentration	1959–1960	ITV	
Biggles	1960	ITV	
Bootsie and Snudge	1960–1963	ITV	
All Our Yesterdays	1960–1973; 1987–1989	ITV	
Take a Letter	1962–1964	ITV	
The Odd Man	1962–1967	ITV	
World in Action	1963–1998	ITV	
A Choice of Coward	1964	ITV	
Pardon the Expression	1965–1967	ITV	Spin-off of Coronation Street
The Corridor People	1966	ITV	
Turn Out the Lights	1967	ITV	
The Caesars	1968	ITV	
Spindoe	1968	ITV	
Nearest and Dearest	1968–1973	ITV	
Big Breadwinner Hog	1969	ITV	
The Dustbinmen	1969–1970	ITV	
Lift Off with Ayshea	1969–1974	ITV	
The Owl Service	1969–1970	ITV	
A Family at War	1970–1972	ITV	
The Lovers	1970–1971	ITV	
The Magic Ball	1971–1972	ITV	co-production with Stop Frame Productions
The Comedians	1971–1993	ITV	
Clapperboard	1972–1982	ITV	
Crown Court	1972–1984	ITV	
Sam	1973–1975	ITV	
Hickory House	1973–1977	ITV	
The Nearly Man	1974	ITV	
The Wheeltappers and Shunters Social Club	1974–1977	ITV	
Shang-a-Lang	1975	ITV	
The Cuckoo Waltz	1975–1980	ITV	
The Stars Look Down	1975	ITV	
Arrows	1976–1977	ITV	
The Ghosts of Motley Hall	1976-1978	ITV	
So It Goes	1976–1977	ITV	
Yanks Go Home	1976–1977	ITV	
Laurence Olivier Presents	1976–1978	ITV	
Get It Together	1977–1981	ITV	
Strangers	1978–1982	ITV	
Leave it to Charlie	1978–1980	ITV	
Brideshead Revisited	1981	ITV	
Wood and Walters	1981–1982	ITV	
All for Love	1982–1983	ITV	
Foxy Lady	1982–1984	ITV	
Brass	1983–1984; 1990	ITV; Channel 4	
Alphabet Zoo	1983–1984	ITV	
Alfresco	1983–1984	ITV	
Chessgame	1983	ITV	
The Jewel in the Crown	1984	ITV	
Travelling Man	1984	ITV	
Sherlock Holmes	1984–1994	ITV	
Tickle on the Tum	1984–1988	ITV	
Dramarama	1984–1989	ITV	6 episodes
Albion Market	1985–1986	ITV	
The Practice	1985–1986	ITV	
Connections	1985–1990	ITV	
Bulman	1985–1987	ITV	
Busman's Holiday	1985–1993	ITV	
The Brothers McGregor	1985–1988	ITV	
Lost Empires	1986	ITV	
First Among Equals	1986	ITV	
Allsorts	1987–1995	ITV	
Floodtide	1987–1988	ITV	
Watching	1987–1993	ITV	
Runway	1987–1993	ITV	
The Hit Man and Her	1988–1992	ITV	
Surgical Spirit	1989–1995	ITV	
Children's Ward	1989–2000	ITV	
Capstick's Law	1989	ITV	
Confessional	1989	ITV	
Cluedo	1990–1993	ITV	
Jeeves and Wooster	1990–1993	ITV	
Stars in Their Eyes	1990–2006	ITV	
Prime Suspect	1991–2006	ITV	
Extraordinary People	1992–1993	ITV	
Conjugal Rites	1993–1994	ITV	
Cracker	1993–2006	ITV	
Sooty and Co.	1993–1998	ITV (CITV)	co-production with Sooty Films
The Mrs Merton Show	1994–1998	BBC One	
Band of Gold	1996–1997	ITV	
Lucky Numbers	1995–1997	ITV	
God's Gift	1996–1998	ITV	
Carnal Knowledge	1996	ITV	co-production with Rapido TV
Springhill	1996–1997	Sky 1	
Holding the Baby	1997–1998	ITV	
Cold Feet	1997–2003	ITV	
The Grand	1997–1998	ITV	
Reckless	1997	ITV	
Waffle	1998	ITV	
Mrs Merton and Malcolm	1999	ITV	
The Last Train	1999	ITV	
Butterfly Collectors	1999	ITV	miniseries
Always and Everyone	1999–2002	ITV	
Sooty Heights	1999–2000	ITV (CITV)	co-production with Sooty Films
Bob Martin	2000–2001	ITV	
The Biggest Game in Town	2001	ITV	
Doctor Zhivago	2002	ITV	
Brainiac: Science Abuse	2003–2008	Sky One	
Life Begins	2004–2006	ITV	
The Brief	2004–2005	ITV	
Sex Traffic	2004	Channel 4/CBC	co-production with Big Motion Pictures; Not owned by ITV Studios
Go, Baby!	2004–2005	Disney Channel	co-production with Little Airplane Productions; Owned by The Walt Disney Company
Bloodlines	2005	ITV	miniseries
Gerry Anderson's New Captain Scarlet	2005	ITV (CITV)	produced by Anderson Entertainment and Indestructible Production Company
Casanova	2005	BBC Three	co-production with Red Production Company and BBC Cymru Wales
Brainiac: History Abuse	2005	Sky One	
Colditz	2005	ITV	
Vincent	2005–2006	ITV	
Northern Lights	2006	ITV	
Eleventh Hour	2006	ITV	
See No Evil: The Moors Murders	2006	ITV	
Supernormal	2007–2008	CITV	co-production with World Leaders Entertainment and Fatkat Animation
Boowa and Kwala	2008	Canal J	co-production with Timoon Animation
It's Not What You Know	2008	Challenge	

==== London Weekend Television ====
Title	Network	Years	Notes
Frost on Sunday	London Weekend	1968–70	
Please Sir!	ITV	1968–72	
On the Buses	ITV	1969–73	
Hark at Barker	ITV	1969–70	
Curry and Chips	ITV	1969	
Tommy Cooper; It's Tommy Cooper	ITV	1969–71	
Catweazle	ITV	1970–71	
Budgie	ITV	1971–72	
Upstairs, Downstairs	ITV	1971–75	
Weekend World	ITV	1972–88	
Within These Walls	ITV	1974–78	
No, Honestly	ITV	1974–75	
Supersonic	ITV	1975–76	
Just William	ITV	1977–78	
Love for Lydia	ITV	1977	
The Professionals	ITV	1977–83	co-production with Avengers Mark 1 Productions
Mind Your Language	ITV	1977–79	
Lillie	ITV	1978	
End of Part One	ITV	1979–80	
Gay Life	LWT	1980–81	
The Gentle Touch	ITV	1980–84	
Game for a Laugh	ITV	1981–85	
The Six O'Clock Show	LWT	1982–88	
Whoops Apocalypse	ITV	1982	
Agatha Christie's Partners in Crime	ITV	1983–84	
Me and My Girl	ITV	1984–88	
Dempsey and Makepeace	ITV	1985–86	co-production with Golden Eagle Films
Saturday Live; Friday Night Live (1988)	Channel 4 ITV	1985–88; 1996	
Mapp & Lucia	Channel 4	1985–1986	
Saint and Greavsie	ITV	1985–92	
Hot Metal	ITV	1986–88	co-production with Humphrey Barclay Productions
Beadle's About	ITV	1986–96	co-production with Ralph Edwards Productions and Action Time
The Two of Us	ITV	1986–90	
You Bet!	ITV	1988–97	
Friday Now	LWT	1988–89	
Square Deal	ITV	1988–89	
Hale and Pace	ITV	1988–98	
Six O'Clock Live	LWT	1989–92	
Close to Home	ITV	1989–90	
The Piglet Files	ITV	1990–92	
Second Thoughts	ITV	1991–94	
Barrymore	ITV	1991–97; 2000	
The Good Guys	ITV	1992–93	co-production with Havahall Pictures (series 2)
Sam Saturday	ITV	1992	co-production with Cinema Verity
In Bed with Medinner	ITV	1992–99	
Faith in the Future	ITV	1995–98	
My Kind of People	ITV	1995	
My Kind of Music	ITV	1998–2002	
Don't Try This at Home	ITV	1998–2001	co-production with Golden Square Pictures
Airline	ITV	1998–2007	
The Moment of Truth	ITV	1998–2001	
Popstars	ITV	2001	
Popstars: The Rivals	ITV	2002	

==== Yorkshire Television ====
Title	Network	Years	Notes
Gazette	ITV	1968	
Tom Grattan's War	ITV	1968–1970	
Whicker's World	ITV	1968–1983	
How We Used to Live	ITV; Channel 4	1968–2002	
Sez Les	ITV	1969–1976	
The Main Chance	ITV	1969–1975	
Jokers Wild	ITV	1969–1974	
Hadleigh	ITV	1969–1976	
Parkin's Patch	ITV	1969–1970	
The Flaxton Boys	ITV	1969–1973	
On the House	ITV	1970–1971	
Kate	ITV	1970–1972	
Albert and Victoria	ITV	1970–1971	
Dear Mother...Love Albert	ITV	1970–1972	
Queenie's Castle	ITV	1970–1972	
Justice	ITV	1971–1974	
Mister Trimble	ITV	1972–1977	
The Organization	ITV	1972	
The Indoor League	ITV	1973–1977	
Beryl's Lot	ITV	1973–1977	
My Old Man	ITV	1974–1975	
Rising Damp	ITV	1974–1978	
Oh No It's Selwyn Froggitt; Selwyn	ITV	1974–1978	
Don't Ask Me	ITV	1974–1978	
Raffles	ITV	1975–1977	
Dawson's Weekly	ITV	1975	
Animal Kwackers	ITV	1975–1978	
Hello Cheeky	ITV	1976	
Dickens of London	ITV	1976	
Wilde Alliance	ITV	1978	
3-2-1	ITV	1978–1988	
The Sandbaggers	ITV	1978–1980	
The Book Tower	ITV	1979–1989	
Don't Just Sit There	ITV	1979–1980	
How's Your Father?	ITV	1979–1980	
In Loving Memory	ITV	1979–1986	
Only When I Laugh	ITV	1979–1982	
Arthur C. Clarke's Mysterious World	ITV	1980	
The Gaffer	ITV	1981–1983	
Get Lost!	ITV	1981	
That's My Boy	ITV	1981–1986	
Bullseye	ITV; Challenge	1981–1995; 2006	as Granada Yorkshire; continued from ATV and Central
Airline	ITV	1982	
The Bounder	ITV	1982–1983	
Harry's Game	ITV	1982	
Hallelujah!	ITV	1983–1984	
First Tuesday	ITV	1983–1993	
One Summer	Channel 4	1983	
The Outsider	ITV	1983	
Duty Free	ITV	1984–1986	
Killer	ITV	1984	
The Beiderbecke Affair	ITV	1985	
Arthur C. Clarke's World of Strange Powers	ITV	1985	
Home to Roost	ITV	1985–1990	
The Giddy Game Show	ITV (CITV)	1985–1987	
Puddle Lane	ITV (CITV)	1985–1989	
Ask No Questions	ITV	1986–1987	
The Raggy Dolls	ITV (CITV)	1986–1994	co-production with Orchard Productions
High & Dry	ITV	1987	
My Husband and I	ITV	1987–1988	
The Beiderbecke Tapes	ITV	1987	
The Beiderbecke Connection	ITV	1988	
A Bit of a Do	ITV	1989	
Judith Krantz's Till We Meet Again	ITV/CBS	1989	co-production with Steve Krantz Productions
All Change	ITV (CITV)	1989–1991	
Stay Lucky	ITV	1989–1993	
Haggard	ITV	1990–1992	
Cannon and Ball's Casino	ITV	1990	
Cannon and Ball's Playhouse	ITV	1990	
The Darling Buds of May	ITV	1991–1993	co-production with Excelsior Productions
Plaza Patrol	ITV	1991	
Bad Influence!	ITV (CITV)	1992–1996	
Circles of Deceit	ITV	1993–1996	
A Pinch of Snuff	ITV	1994	
Arthur C. Clarke's Mysterious Universe	Discovery Channel	1994–1995	
Downwardly Mobile	ITV	1994	
The Wanderer	Sky One	1994	co-production with FingerTip Films
Bad Level 10	TCC	1995	
Chiller	ITV	1995	
The Governor	ITV	1995–1996	co-production with La Plante Productions
The Big Bang	ITV (CITV)	1996–2004	
Supply & Demand	ITV	1997–1998	co-production with La Plante Productions
Adam's Family Tree	ITV (CITV)	1997–1999	
Titch	ITV (CITV)	1997–2001	co-production with Hutchins Film Company
Trial & Retribution	ITV	1997–2009	co-production with La Plante Productions
Bernard's Watch	ITV (CITV)	1997–2001; 2004–2005	as Granada Yorkshire; continued from Central and Carlton
Big Bag	ITV (CITV)	1998–1999	co-production with Children's Television Workshop
Coming Home	ITV	1998	
Verdict	ITV	1998	
Jungle Run	ITV (CITV)	1999–2006	
At Home with the Braithwaites	ITV	2000–2003	
Steel River Blues	ITV	2004	

==== Tyne Tees Television ====
Title	Network	Years	Notes
The Geordie Scene	TTTV	1974–1976	
Northern Life	TTTV	1976–1992	
The Paper Lads	ITV	1977–1979	
Alright Now	ITV	1979–1980	
Check It Out	ITV	1979–1982	
Barriers	ITV	1981–1982	
Razzmatazz	ITV	1981–1987	
Madabout	ITV	1981–1984	
Andy Robson	ITV	1982–1983	
The Tube	Channel 4	1982–1987	
Dramarama	ITV (CITV)	1983–1989	7 episodes
How Dare You!	ITV (CITV)	1984–1987	
Super Gran	ITV (CITV)	1985–1987	
Crosswits	ITV	1985–1998	co-production with Cove Productions and Action Time
Get Fresh	ITV	1986–1988	co-production with various ITV companies
Chain Letters	ITV	1987–1997	co-production with Barry & Enright Productions and Action Time
The Roxy	ITV	1987–1988	
Gimme 5	ITV	1992–1994	

==== Meridian ====
Title	Network	Years	Notes
ZZZap!	ITV (CITV)	1993–2001	co-production with The Media Merchants
The Ruth Rendell Mysteries	ITV	1994–2000	series 7-12; co-produced with Blue Heaven
Shine on Harvey Moon	ITV	1995	co-production with WitzEnd Productions
It's a Mystery	ITV (CITV)	1996–2002	co-production with The Media Merchants; Currently owned by Mattel Television
Havakazoo	Channel 5	1997–2002	
Teddybears	ITV (CITV)	1997–2000	co-production with Link Entertainment; Currently co-owned with DreamWorks Animation
Dog and Duck	ITV (CITV)	2000–2003	
William and Mary	ITV	2003–2005	
Fallen	ITV	2004	

==== Anglia ====
Title	Network	Years	Notes
Survival	ITV	1961–2001	
Weavers Green	ITV	1966	
Who Were the British?	ITV	1966	
Bygones	ITV	1967–1989; 2007	
Orson Welles Great Mysteries	ITV	1973–1974	
Backs to the Land	ITV	1977–1978	
Tales of the Unexpected	ITV	1979–1988	
Marjorie and Men	ITV	1985	
A Killing on the Exchange	ITV	1987	
Sweethearts	ITV	1987	
Knightmare	ITV (CITV)	1987–1994	
Anything More Would Be Greedy	ITV	1989	
The Chief	ITV	1990–1995	
Jumble	ITV	1991–1992	
Framed	ITV; A&E	1992	co-production with A&E and Tesauro Productions
My Good Friend	ITV	1995–1996	co-production with Hartswood Films
Touching Evil	ITV	1997–1999	

==== Cosgrove Hall Films ====
Title	Network	Years	Notes
Avenger Penguins	ITV (CITV)	1993–1994	co-production with Granada/Anglia
Oakie Doke	Children's BBC	1995–1997	
Fantomcat	ITV (CITV)	1995–1996	co-production with Anglia
The Animal Shelf	ITV (CITV)	1997–2000	co-production with Anglia
Rocky and the Dodos	ITV (CITV)	1998–1999	co-production with Anglia
The Foxbusters	ITV (CITV)	1999–2000	co-production with Anglia
Little Grey Rabbit	ITV (CITV)	2000	co-production with United Productions
Fetch the Vet	ITV (CITV)	2000–2001	
Vampires, Pirates & Aliens	ITV (CITV)	2000	co-production with Millimages and France Animation
Engie Benjy	ITV (CITV)	2002–2004	
Albie	ITV (CITV)	2002–2004	

=== Carlton Television ===
Title	Network	Years	Notes
Crossroads	ITV	1964–1988; 2001–2003	continued from ATV and Central
Family Fortunes	ITV	1980–2002	continued from ATV and Central; co-production with Mark Goodson Productions/Pearson Television and Talbot Television
Inspector Morse	ITV	1987–2000	continued from Central; co-production with Zenith Productions
The Upper Hand	ITV	1990–1996	continued from Central; co-production with Columbia Pictures Television/Columbia TriStar Television
Tots TV	ITV (CITV)	1993–1998	continued from Central; co-production with Ragdoll Productions
Peak Practice	ITV	1993–2002	continued from Central
Michael Ball	ITV	1993–1995	co-production with Action Time
Supermarket Sweep	ITV	1993–2001	continued from Central and Talbot Television; co-production with Grundy
The Spooks of Bottle Bay	ITV (CITV)	1993–1995	co-production with Fugitive/Playboard Puppets
Alphabet Castle	ITV (CITV)	1993–1995	co-production with Michael Cole
Old Bear Stories	ITV (CITV)	1993–1997	co-production with Optomen Television and Ealing Animation
99-1	ITV	1994–1995	co-production with Zenith Entertainment
Talking Telephone Numbers	ITV	1994–1997	co-production with Celador
Class Act	ITV	1994–1995	co-production with Cinema Verity
Sharman	ITV	1995–1996	co-production with World Productions
Bramwell	ITV	1995–1998	co-production with Whitby Davison Productions
Is It Legal?	ITV; Channel 4	1995–1998	co-production with Hartswood Films
Potamus Park	ITV (CITV)	1996–1998	continued from Central; co-production with Zoo Gang Productions
London Bridge	ITV	1996–1999	
Timbuctoo	ITV (CITV)	1998–2000	co-production with Flicks Films
Barbara	ITV	1999–2003	
Mopatop's Shop	ITV (CITV)	1999–2005	co-production with The Jim Henson Company; Owned by The Jim Henson Company
Grizzly Tales for Gruesome Kids	ITV (CITV)	2000–2007	co-production with Honeycomb Animation and Elephant Productions
Starstreet	ITV (CITV)	2001–2002	co-production with Byrne Blood Productions
Fortysomething	ITV	2003	
Making Waves	ITV	2004	

==== ATV ====
Title	Network	Years	Notes
Emergency Ward 10	ITV	1957–1967	
The Larkins	ITV	1958–1960; 1963–1964	
The Strange World of Gurney Slade	ITV	1960	
Two of a Kind	ITV	1961–1968	
The Plane Makers	ITV	1963–1965	
The Des O'Connor Show	ITV	1963–1973	
Sergeant Cork	ITV	1963–1968	
Fire Crackers	ITV	1964–1965	
Star Soccer	ATV	1965–1983	
The Power Game	ITV	1968–1969	
Mrs Thursday	ITV	1966–1967	
George and the Dragon	ITV	1966–1968	
Market in Honey Lane	ITV	1967–1969	
The Golden Shot	ITV	1967–1975	
Virgin of the Secret Service	ITV	1968	
Goodbye Again	ITV	1968–1969	
Timeslip	ITV	1970–1971	
Hine	ITV	1971	
Alexander the Greatest	ITV	1971–1972	
The Marty Feldman Comedy Machine	ITV; ABC	1971	co-production with Greg Garrison Productions and Marty Feldman Scripts, Ltd.
General Hospital	ITV	1972–1979	
The Strauss Family	ITV	1972	
Pipkins	ITV	1973–1981	
The Jensen Code	ITV	1973	
The Squirrels	ITV	1974–1977	
Carry On Laughing	ITV	1975	
Edward the Seventh	ITV	1975	
The Cedar Tree	ITV	1976–1979	
Beasts	ITV	1976	
A Bunch of Fives	ITV	1977–1978	
Raven	ITV	1977	
The Losers	ITV	1978	
Turtle's Progress	ITV	1979–1980	
Sapphire & Steel	ITV	1979–1982	
Shillingbury Tales	ITV	1981	
Till Death...	ITV	1981	
Diamonds	ITV	1981	

==== Central ====
Title	Network	Years	Notes
New Faces	ITV	1973–1978; 1986–1988	continued from ATV
Starting Out	ITV	1973–1992	continued from ATV
Tiswas	ATV (1974–77); ITV (1977–82)	1974–1982	continued from ATV
Young at Heart	ITV	1980–1982	continued from ATV
The Other 'Arf	ITV	1980–1984	continued from ATV; co-production with Witzend Productions
Astronauts	ITV	1981–1983	continued from ATV
O.T.T.	ITV	1982	
Let's Pretend	ITV	1982–1988	
Shine on Harvey Moon	ITV	1982–1985	co-production with Witzend Productions
Murphy's Mob	ITV	1982–1985	
Dead Ernest	ITV	1982	
The Saturday Show	ITV	1982–1984	
Cuffy	ITV	1983	
Luna	ITV	1983–1984	
Dramarama	ITV (CITV)	1983–1989	16 episodes
Auf Wiedersehen, Pet	ITV	1983–1986	co-production with Witzend Productions
Spitting Image	ITV	1984–1996	co-production with Spitting Image Productions
Annika	ITV	1984	
The Price Is Right	ITV	1984–1988	co-production with Mark Goodson Productions and Talbot Television; Certain elements owned by Fremantle
The Saturday Starship	ITV	1984–1985	
The Last Place on Earth	ITV	1985	
Roll Over Beethoven	ITV	1985	
Mog	ITV	1985–1986	co-production with Witzend Productions
Tales from Fat Tulip's Garden	ITV (CITV)	1985–1987	
Connie	ITV	1985–1986	
Your Mother Wouldn't Like It	ITV (CITV)	1985–1988	
Constant Hot Water	ITV	1986	
Boon	ITV	1986–1992; 1995	
Central Weekend	Central	1986–2001	
Unnatural Causes	ITV	1986	
Yesterday's Dreams	ITV	1987	
Sporting Triangles	ITV	1987–1990	
Hardwicke House	ITV	1987	
Playbox	ITV (CITV)	1987–1992	co-production with Ragdoll Productions
Intimate Contact	ITV	1987	miniseries
The Cook Report	ITV	1987–1999	
Hard Cases	ITV	1988–1989	
The One Game	ITV	1988	
Press Gang	ITV (CITV)	1989–1993	
Find a Family	ITV	1989–1991	
Woof!	ITV (CITV)	1989–1997	
About Face	ITV	1989–1991	
Saracen	ITV	1989	
Chancer	ITV	1990–1991	
Family Pride	Central; Channel 4	1991–1992	
Very Big Very Soon	ITV	1991	
The Tuesday Special	ITV	1991–1997	
Stanley and the Women	ITV	1991	
The Blackheath Poisonings	ITV	1992	
Harry's Mad	ITV (CITV)	1993–1996	
Stanley's Dragon	ITV (CITV)	1994	co-production with Gatearn
Cadfael	ITV	1994–1998	
Faith	ITV	1994	miniseries
Kavanagh QC	ITV	1995–2001	
Dangerous Lady	ITV	1995	miniseries; co-production with Warner Sisters Productions
Wolves, Witches and Giants	ITV (CITV)	1995–1998	co-production with Honeycomb Animation
Out of Sight	ITV (CITV)	1996–1998	
The Jump	ITV	1998	co-production with Warner Sisters Productions

==== HTV ====
Title	Network	Years	Notes
Pretenders	ITV	1972	
Arthur of the Britons	ITV	1972–1973	
Sky	ITV	1975	
The Georgian House	ITV	1976	
Westway	ITV	1976	
Children of the Stones	ITV	1977	
King of the Castle	ITV	1977	
The Doombolt Chase	ITV	1978	
The Clifton House Mystery	ITV	1978	
Into the Labyrinth	ITV	1981–1982	
Taff Acre	ITV	1981	
Jamaica Inn	ITV	1983	
Storybook International	ITV	1983–1986	
Robin of Sherwood	ITV	1984–1985	co-production with Goldcrest Films
The Dragon Has Two Tongues	Channel 4	1985	
Dramarama	ITV (CITV)	1985–1989	10 episodes
Return to Treasure Island	ITV; The Disney Channel	1986	co-production with Primetime Television Ltd. and Walt Disney Television
Rolf's Cartoon Club	ITV (CITV)	1989–1993	
We Are Seven	ITV	1989; 1991	
Telltale	ITV	1993	
Rubbish, King of the Jumble	ITV (CITV)	1993–1994	co-production with A Productions
Wycliffe	ITV	1993–1998	
The Slow Norris	ITV (CITV)	1995–1999	co-production with Hat Trick Productions
The Worst Witch	ITV (CITV); YTV	1998–2001	co-production with Global Arts Productions and Galafilm
Nuts and Bolts	HTV/ITV2	1999–2002	
Oliver Twist	ITV/PBS	1999	produced by Diplomat Films and United Productions
Little Grey Rabbit	ITV (CITV)	2000	produced by Cosgrove Hall Films and United Productions

==== Zodiac Entertainment ====
Title	Years	Network	Notes
Widget the World Watcher	1990–1991	Syndication	co-production with Calico Entertainment and Sei Young Animation
Mr. Bogus	1991–1993	Syndication	co-production with Calico Entertainment and Sei Young Animation
Twinkle, the Dream Being	1992–1993	Syndication; MBC	co-production with Calico Entertainment and Sei Young Animation

==== ITC Entertainment ====
Title	Network	Years	Notes
The Halls of Ivy	CBS	1954–1955	co-production with Television Programs of America
The Adventures of Robin Hood	ITV	1955–1959	
The Adventures of the Scarlet Pimpernel	ITV	1955–1956	
Fury	NBC	1955–1960	
The Count of Monte Cristo	ITV	1956	
The Gale Storm Show	CBS (1956–59); ABC (1959–60)	1956–1960	produced by Hal Roach Studios
Hawkeye and the Last of the Mohicans	Syndication	1957	
The New Adventures of Charlie Chan	Syndication	1957–1958	
O.S.S.	ITV; ABC	1957–1958	co-production with Buckeye Productions
Cannonball	ITV; CBC; Syndication	1958–1959	
New York Confidential	ITV; Syndication	1958–1959	co-production with Metropolis Productions
The Invisible Man	ITV; CBS	1958–1959	
Danger Man	ITV	1960–1968	
Supercar	ITV	1961–1962	Distribution; produced by AP Films
Ghost Squad	ITV	1961–1964	
Sir Francis Drake	ITV	1961–1962	
Man of the World	ITV	1962–1963	
The Saint	ITV	1962–1969	co-production with New World Production and Bamore
Gideon's Way	ITV	1964–1966	Distribution; produced by New World Production
Seaway	ATV; CBC	1965–1966	co-production with Seaway Films
Thunderbirds	ITV	1965–1966	
Man in a Suitcase	ITV	1967–1968	
The Prisoner	ITV	1967–1968	co-production with Everyman Films
Captain Scarlet and the Mysterons	ITV	1967–1968	distribution; produced by Century 21 Television Productions
The Champions	ITV	1968–1969	
Joe 90	ATV	1968–1969	distribution; produced by Century 21 Television Productions
Department S	ITV	1969–1970	
Randall and Hopkirk (Deceased)	ITV	1969–1970	co-production with Scoton
Strange Report	ITV	1969–1970	co-production with Arena Productions
The Secret Service	ITV	1969	distribution; produced by Century 21 Television Productions
UFO	ATV	1970–1971	distribution; produced by Century 21 Television Productions
From a Bird's Eye View	ATV/NBC	1970–1971	co-production with Sheldon Leonard Productions
The Adventures of Rupert Bear	ITV	1970–1977	
Shirley's World	ABC	1971–1972	
Jason King	ITV	1971–1972	
The Persuaders!	ITV	1971–1972	
The Protectors	ITV	1972–1974	distribution; produced by Group Three Productions
The Zoo Gang	ITV	1974	
Space 1999	ITV	1975–1977	co-production with RAI (season 1), Group Three Productions (season 1) and Gerry Anderson Productions (season 2)
The Muppet Show	ITV; Syndication	1976–1981	co-production with Associated Television, Henson Associates and CBS Owned Television Stations; Owned by The Walt Disney Company
Jesus of Nazareth	Rai 1 ITV	1977	co-production with RAI
Bonkers!	ITV; Syndication	1978–79	
The Munch Bunch	ITV	1980–82	
Hammer House of Horror	ITV	1980	co-production with Hammer Films and Cinema Arts International
The Two of Us	CBS	1981–82	produced by Marble Arch Productions
Maggie	ABC	1981–82	produced by Erma Bombeck Productions and Marble Arch Productions
Windmills of the Gods	CBS	1988	co-production with Dove, Inc.
People Like Us	NBC	May 13-14, 1990	
Second Chances	CBS	1993–94	co-production with Latham-Lechowick Productions
Thunderbirds USA	Fox Kids	1994	co-production with Associated Images, Inc.
Hotel Malibu	CBS	1994	co-production with Latham-Lechowick Productions
The Big Easy	USA Network	1996–97	co-production with Grosso-Jacobson Productions

=== Lifted Entertainment ===
Title	Years	Network	Notes
University Challenge	1962–present	ITV/BBC Two	continued from Granada Television and ITV Studios
It'll Be Alright on the Night	1977–present	ITV	continued from LWT and ITV Studios
An Audience With...	1978–present	ITV/Channel 4	continued from LWT and ITV Studios
Countdown	1982–present	Channel 4	continued from Yorkshire Television and ITV Studios; Based on Des chiffres et des lettres by France Televisions
The Big Breakfast	1992–2022	Channel 4	continued from Planet 24
Ant & Dec's Saturday Night Takeaway	2002–present	ITV	continued from Granada Television and ITV Studios; Co-production with Mitre Studios
I'm a Celebrity...Get Me Out of Here!	2002–present	ITV	continued from LWT and ITV Studios
Dancing on Ice	2006–present	ITV	continued from ITV Studios
The Big Quiz	2011–present	ITV	continued from ITV Studios
8 Out of 10 Cats Does Countdown	2012–present	Channel 4	continued from ITV Studios co-production with Zeppotron
Love Island	2015–present	ITV2	continued from ITV Studios; Co-production with Motion Content Group
The Voice Kids	2017–present	ITV	continued from ITV Studios co-production with Talpa (2017–2019)
Dress to Impress	2017–present	ITV2	continued from ITV Studios co-production with Accidentally on Purpose
The Voice UK	2018–present	ITV	continued from ITV Studios co-production with Talpa (2018–2019)
In for a Penny	2019–2024	ITV	continued from ITV Studios; Co-production with Mitre Studios
Olivia Meets Her Match	2020–present	ITVBe	continued from ITV Studios
The Pet Show	2021–present	ITV	
Walk the Line	2021	ITV	co-production with Syco Entertainment
Bad Chefs	2022	ITV2	

=== Mammoth Screen ===
Title	Network	Years	Notes
Bonekickers	BBC One	2008	
Lost in Austen	ITV	2008	Miniseries
Wuthering Heights	ITV; PBS	2009	co-production with WGBH
Endeavour	ITV; PBS	2012–2023	co-production with Masterpiece
Parade's End	BBC Two; HBO; VRT	2012	Miniseries; co-production with HBO
Falcón	Sky Atlantic; Canal+ ZDF	2012	
Poldark	BBC One	2015–2019	co-production with Masterpiece
And Then There Were None	BBC One	2015	Miniseries; co-production with Agatha Christe Productions, Acorn Productions and A&E Networks
Victoria	ITV	2016–2019	co-production with Masterpiece
The Witness for the Prosecution	BBC One	2016	Miniseries; co-production with Agatha Christie Productions, Acorn Productions and A&E Networks
Fearless	ITV	2017	co-production with The Weinstein Company
Next of Kin	ITV	2018	
Ordeal by Innocence	BBC One	2018	co-production with Agatha Christie Limited
The City and the City	BBC Two	2018	
Vanity Fair	ITV; Amazon Prime Video	2018	co-production with Amazon Studios
The ABC Murders	BBC One	2018	co-production with Agatha Christie Productions
World on Fire	BBC One	2019–present	
The War of the Worlds	BBC One	2019	co-production with Creasun Media and Red Square
The Pale Horse	BBC One	2020	co-production with Agatha Christie Productions
McDonald & Dodds	ITV	2020–present	
Noughts + Crosses	BBC One	2020–present	co-production with Participant and Roc Nation
The Singapore Grip	ITV	2020	
The Serpent	BBC One	2021	
The Tower	ITV	2021	
Why Didn't They Ask Evans	BritBox	2022	co-production with Agatha Christie Productions

=== Potato ===
Title	Network	Years	Notes
The Chase	ITV	2009–present	continued from ITV Studios
Four Weddings	Sky Living	2009–2013	continued from ITV Studios
The Big Reunion	ITV2	2013–2014	continued from ITV Studios
Autopsy: The Last Hours of...	Channel 5 Reelz	2014–present	
Bear Grylls' Survival School	CITV	2015–2017	co-production with Bear Grylls Ventures
Ninja Warrior UK	ITV	2015–present	
Go for It	ITV	2016	co-production with Talpa
Sam and Billie Faiers: The Mummy Diaries	ITVBe	2016–2021	
Cannonball	ITV	2017	co-production with Talpa
Paddington Station 24/7	Channel 5	2017–present	
Fern McCann: First Time Mum	ITVBe	2017–present	
My Favourite Sketch	Gold	2018	
Beat the Chasers	ITV	2020–present	
Winning Combination	ITV	2020–2021	
Ready to Mingle	ITV2	2021	
Billie and Greg: The Family Diaries	ITVBe	2021–present	
Moneyball	ITV	2021–present	co-production with Possessed
Sitting on a Fortune	ITV	2021–present	co-production with Possessed

=== Twofour ===
Title	Network	Years	Notes
Great Westerners	ITV	1994	
On the Moor	ITV	1995	
Watercolour Challenge	Channel 4/Channel 5	1998–2022	continued from Planet 24
Dead Famous	LivingTV	2004–2006	
The Hotel Inspector	Channel 5	2005–present	
Born to Kill?	Sky One/Channel 5	2005–2016	
Break with the Boss	Living TV	2006	
Challenge Anneka	ITV; Channel 5	2006–2007; 2023–present	continued from ITV Studios co-production with Krempelwood Entertainment (2023–)
Are You Smarter than a 10 Year Old?	Sky One	2007–2010	co-production with Mark Burnett Productions
Noel's HQ	Sky One	2008–2009	
Ty Pennington's Great British Adventure	Home	2008–2010	
Big Chef Takes on Little Chefs	Channel 4	2009	
Dating in the Dark	Sky Living/ITV2	2009–2016	Previously produced by Initial
Road Warriors	ITV	2010	
High Street Dreams	BBC One	2010	
My Funniest Year	Channel 4	2010–2011	
Choccywoccydoodah	Good Food	2011–2016	
Educating...	Channel 4	2011–2020	
Paddy's Show and Telly	ITV	2011–2012	co-production with GroupM Entertainment
Cornwall with Caroline Quentin	ITV	2012–2013	
Alex Polizzi: The Fixer	BBC Two	2012–2015	
The Exclusives	ITV2	2012	
Home of the Future	Channel 4	2012	
The Angel	Sky One	2012	
A Night of Heroes: The Sun Military Awards	ITV	2012	
Splash!	ITV	2013–2014	
Kavos Weekender	ITV2	2013–present	co-production with Motion Content Group
James Nesbitt's Ireland	ITV	2013	
The Jump	Channel 4	2014–2017	co-production with Motion Content Group
Killing Spree	Channel 5	2014	
The Housing Enforcers	BBC One	2014–present	
Our School	CBBC	2014–present	
Taking New York	E4	2015	
Impossible Engineering	Yesterday	2015–present	
Alex Polizzi: Chefs on Trial	BBC Two	2015	
Eternal Glory	ITV	2015	
The Real Marigold Hotel	BBC One	2016–present	
Motherland	BBC Two	2016–present	continued from Delightful Industries; co-production with Merman and Lionsgate UK
This Time Next Year	ITV	2016–2019	
Spectacular Spain with Alex Polizzi	Channel 5	2017–present	
Change Your Tune	ITV	2018	
Our Shirley Valentine Summer	ITV	2018	
Take the Tower	ITV4	2018	
Save Money Lose Weight	ITV	2019–present	
Beat the Chef	Channel 4	2019–present	co-production with Motion Content Group
Skin A&E	5Star	2019–present	continued from Boomerang co-production with Boom Cymru
Win the Wilderness: Alaska	BBC Two	2020	
The Chocolate Challenge	Channel 5	2020	co-production with Motion Content Group
Cornwall and Devon Walks with Julia Bradbury	ITV	2021	
Million Pound Pawn	ITV	2021–2022	
Happy Campers: The Holiday Camp	Channel 5	2021–present	co-production with Motion Content Group
Bling!	ITV	2021–present	co-production with Possessed
Hotel Benidorm: Sun, Sea & Sangria	Channel 5	2022–present	
Make Me Prime Minister	Channel 4	2022	co-production with Accidentally on Purpose
Loaded in Paradise	ITVX	2022–present	co-production with Motion Content Group

==== Boomerang ====
Title	Network	Years	Notes
Tales of Friendship with Winnie the Pooh	Disney Junior	2012	co-production with Maga Animation Studio
Posh Pawnbrokers	Channel 4	2016	
Extreme Cake Makers	Channel 4	2017–2019	
What Would Your Kid Do?	ITV	2018–2019	
Star Boot Sale	Channel 4	2018	co-production with Motion Content Group
When Demolitions Go Wrong	Channel 5	2019	
Big Birthers	5Star	2019	

=== 12 Yard ===
Title	Network	Years	Notes
The National Lottery: In It to Win It	BBC One	2002–2016	co-production with BBC Scotland (2010–2016)
Without Prejudice?	Channel 4	2003–2004	
Eggheads	BBC One/BBC Two/Channel 5	2003–present	co-production with BBC Scotland (2010–2020)
Coach Trip	Channel 4/E4	2005–2022	
The Rich List	Fox	2006	
Who Dares Wins	BBC One	2007–2019	co-production with BBC Scotland (2018–2019)
Are You an Egghead?	BBC Two	2008–2009	
The Colour of Money	ITV	2009	
The Money List	Game Show Network	2009	
Holding Out for a Hero	ITV	2011	
Sorority Girls	E4	2011	
Don't Blow the Inheritance	ITV	2012	
Brendan's Magical Mystery Tour	Channel 4	2013	
Take On the Twisters	ITV	2013	
Big Star's Little Star	ITV	2013–2018	
Revenge of the Egghead	BBC Two	2014	
Gift Wrapped	ITV	2014	
5-Star Family Reunion	BBC One	2015–2016	co-production with Boom Cymru
Guess This House	ITV	2015	
Hello Campers	ITV	2015	
Big Star's Bigger Star	ITV	2015–present	
Insert Name Here	BBC Two	2016–2019	co-production with Black Dog Television
Think Tank	BBC One	2016	
Make Me an Egghead	BBC Two	2016	
Catchpoint	BBC One	2019–present	co-production with Possessed
Comedians Giving Lectures	Dave	2019–present	
Unbeatable	BBC One	2021–present	co-production with Possessed
Celebrity Ghost Trip	E4	2021	

=== Possessed ===
Title	Network	Years	Notes
Pick Me!	ITV	2015	
Cash Trapped	ITV	2016–2019	
5 Gold Rings	ITV	2017–2020	
Keep It Spotless	Nickelodeon	2018	co-production with ITV Entertainment, Hard Knocks South Productions and Nickelodeon Productions
Catchpoint	BBC One	2019–present	co-production with 12 Yard
The Switch	ITV	2019	
Unbeatable	BBC One	2021–present	co-production with 12 Yard
Bling	ITV	2021–present	co-production with Twofour
Moneyball	ITV	2021–present	co-production with Potato
Sitting on a Fortune	ITV	2021–present	co-production with Potato
Rat in the Kitchen	TBS	2022–present	co-production with ITV America and Thinkfactory Media

=== Silverprint Pictures ===
Title	Years	Network	Notes
Vera	2011–present	ITV	continued from ITV Studios
Shetland	2013–present	BBC One	continued from ITV Studios
Dark Heart	2016–present	ITV Encore/ITV	continued from ITV Studios
Flesh and Blood	2020	ITV	
The Long Call	2021	ITV	

=== Multistory Media ===
Title	Network	Years	Notes
Up	ITV/BBC One	1964–2019	continued from Granada Television and ITV Studios
60 Minute Makeover	ITV/Quest Red	2004–2018	continued from ITV Studios
Come Dine with Me	Channel 4	2005–present	continued from ITV Studios
Kate Garraway's Life Stories	ITV	2009–2023	
Peter Andre: My Life	ITV2	2009–2013	co-production with Can Associates TV
Katie	ITV/Sky Living/Quest Red	2009–2020	
The Dales	ITV	2011–2013	
The Talent Show Story	ITV	2012	co-production with Thames
Chatsworth	BBC One	2012	
For the Love of Dogs	ITV	2012–present	
The Martin Lewis Money Show	ITV	2012–present	
Britain's Darkest Taboos	Crime+Investigation	2012–2017	
Gino's Italian Escape	ITV	2013–present	
Tales from Northumberland with Robson Green	ITV	2013–2016	
Paul O'Grady's Animal Orphans	ITV	2014–2016	
Couples Come Dine with Me	Channel 4	2014–2020	
Peston on Sunday	ITV	2016–2018	
Tales from the Coast with Robson Green	ITV	2017	
Tommy Cooper Forever	ITV	2017	
All Star Musicals	ITV	2017–present	
Peston	ITV	2018–present	
Wild Bill	ITV	2019	co-production with Anonymous Content and 42
The Big Flower Fight	Netflix	2020–present	
You Are What You Wear	BBC One	2020	

=== Big Talk Productions ===
Title	Network	Years	Notes
Spaced	Channel 4	1999	co-production with LWT and Paramount Comedy Channel
Black Books	Channel 4	2000–2004	co-production with Assembly Film & Television
Free Agents	Channel 4	2009	co-production with Bwark Productions
Rev.	BBC Two	2010–2014	co-production with Handle and Prayer
Him & Her	BBC Three	2010–2013	
Raised by Wolves	Channel 4	2013–2016	
Crashing	Channel 4	2016	
Houdini & Doyle	ITV; Fox; Global	2016	co-production with Shore Z Productions, Shaw Communications, Shaftesbury Films and Sony Pictures Television
Cold Feet	ITV	2016–2020	continued from Granada Television
Back	Channel 4	2017–present	co-production with That Mitchell & Webb Company
Timewasters	ITV2	2017–2019	as Big Talk North
Living the Dream	Sky One	2017–2019	
The Goes Wrong Show	BBC One	2019–present	as Big Talk North; co-production with Mischief Screen and Lionsgate UK
The Outlaws	BBC One; Amazon Prime Video	2021–present	co-production with Four Eyes Entertainment and Amazon Studios
Peacock	BBC Three	2022–present	co-production with Bullion Productions
I Hate You	Channel 4	2022	co-production with Popper Pictures

=== The Garden ===
Title	Network	Years	Notes
24 Hours in A&E	Channel 4	2011–present	
Seven Dwarves	Channel 4	2011	
The Midwives	BBC Two	2012–2013	
Inside Claridge's	BBC Two	2012	
Bedlam	Channel 4	2013	
Hotel India	Channel 4	2014	
24 Hours in Police Custody	Channel 4	2014–present	
10,000 BC	Channel 5/MTV UK	2015–present	co-production with Motion Content Group
Superhospital	ITV	2015	
On the Yorkshire Buses	Channel 5	2015	co-production with Motion Content Group
The Baby Has Landed	BBC Two	2019	
Council House Britain	Channel 4	2020	
Natural History Museum: World of Wonder	Channel 5	2021	
Incredible Journeys with Simon Reeves	BBC Two	2021	
The Lakes with Simon Reeves	BBC Two	2021	
Emergency	Channel 4	2022	
Police Custody USA	Channel 4 Investigation Discovery	2022–present	
Simon Reeve's South America	BBC Two	2022	

=== Oxford Scientific Films ===
Title	Network	Years	Notes
Meerkat Manor	Animal Planet International	2005–2008	
Fatal Attraction	Animal Planet	2010–2013	
Secret Life of Dogs	ITV	2013–2017	
The Queen's Garden	ITV/PBS	2014	Documentary
The Trainer & the Racehorse: The Legend of Frankel	Channel 4	2015	Co-produced with Andaman Media
House of Teen Mums	Channel 4	2016	Documentary
China: Nature's Ancient Kingdom	BBC One/CCTV	2020	Co-produced with EOS Films
Wild Tokyo	ITV/NHK	2020	
Meerkat Manor: Rise Of the Dynasty	BBC One	2021–present	

=== Gameface ===
Title	Network	Years	Notes
Alphabetical	ITV	2016–2017	
Britain's Brightest Family	ITV	2018–2021	
The Void	ITV	2021	

=== Second Act Productions ===
Title	Network	Years	Notes
The Nightly Show	ITV	2017	
Grace	ITV	2021–present	co-production with Tall Story Pictures and Vaudeville Productions

=== Crook Productions ===
Title	Network	Years	Notes
Great Movie Mistakes	BBC Three	2010–2013	
Secret Dates	ITV2	2016	
Thief Trackers	BBC One	2016–2018	Co-produced with Objective Media Group
The Next Great Magician	ITV	2016	Co-produced with Vaudeville Productions

=== Noho Film and Television ===
Title	Years	Network	Notes
The Windsors	2016–present	Channel 4	
Prime Suspect 1973	2017	ITV	co-production with Masterpiece
Zomboat!	2019	ITV2; Hulu	
Tell Me Everything	2022–present	ITVX	

=== Tall Story Pictures ===
Title	Network	Years	Notes
Tutankhamun	ITV	2016	
Bancroft	ITV	2017–2020	
Trauma	ITV	2018	
The Bay	ITV	2019–present	
Sticks and Stones	ITV	2019	
Grace	ITV	2021–present	co-production with Second Act Productions and Vaudeville Productions

=== So Television ===
Title	Network	Years	Notes
Blind Date	ITV/Channel 5	1985–2019	continued from LWT co-production with Stellify Media (2017–2019)
So Graham Norton	Channel 4	1998–2002	
Paul Daniels in a Black Hole	Channel 4	2001	
V Graham Norton	Channel 4	2002–2003	
NY Graham Norton	Comedy Central	2004	
The Graham Norton Effect	Comedy Central	2004	
Graham Norton's Bigger Picture	Channel 4	2005–2006	
Bring Back...	Channel 4	2005–2009	
The Russell Brand Show	Channel 4	2006	
The Graham Norton Show	BBC Two/BBC One	2007–present	
Sorry, I've Got No Head	CBBC	2008–2011	
Pixelface	CBBC	2011–2012	
The Sarah Millican Television Programme	BBC Two	2012–2013	Co-produced with Chopsy Productions
Alan Davies Après-Ski	BBC Two	2014	
Celebrity Home Secrets	ITV	2016	Co-produced with Sunnyside Productions
Chuckle Time	Channel 5	2018	
The John Bishop Show	ITV	2022–present	co-production with Lola Entertainment

=== Mainstreet Pictures ===
Title	Network	Years	Notes
Unforgotten	ITV	2015–present	
Gold Digger	BBC One	2019	

=== World Productions ===
Title	Network	Years	Notes
Between the Lines	BBC One	1992–1994	
Lilies	BBC One	2007	
Party Animals	BBC Two	2007	
Rough Diamond	BBC One/RTÉ	2007	co-production with BBC Northern Ireland
Line of Duty	BBC Two/BBC One	2012–2021	
The Fear	Channel 4	2012	
The Bletchley Circle	ITV	2012–2014	
Dark Angel	ITV	2016	Miniseries
Born to Kill	Channel 4	2017	Miniseries
Save Me	Sky Atlantic	2018–2020	co-production with Sky Studios
The Bletchley Circle: San Francisco	ITV; Citytv	2018	
Bodyguard	BBC One	2018	
The Pembrokeshire Murders	ITV	2021	Miniseries
Vigil	BBC One	2021	Miniseries
Showtrial	BBC One	2021–present	
Anne	ITV	2022	
The Suspect	ITV	2022–present	

== ITV America ==
Title	Network	Years	Notes
I'm a Celebrity...Get Me Out of Here!	ABC/NBC	2003–09	
Celebrity Fit Club	VH1	2005–10	
Kitchen Nightmares	Fox	2007–2014	co-production with Optomen and A. Smith & Co. Productions
WCG Ultimate Gamer	Syfy	2009–10	
Four Weddings	TLC	2010–14	
America Now	Syndication	2010–14	co-production with Raycom Media
Come Dine with Me	BBC America/Lifetime	2011–2013	
The Voice USA	NBC	2011–present	co-production with Warner Horizon Television and MGM Television
The Jeremy Kyle Show	Syndication	2011–2013	Distributed by Debmar-Mercury (United States) and ITV Studios Global Entertainment (International)
The Bill Cunningham Show	Syndication	2011–2016	co-production with Tribune Studios
Prime Suspect	NBC	2011–2012	co-production with Film 44 and Universal Television
The Client List	Lifetime	2012–2013	co-production with Jaffe-Braunstein Entertainment, Fedora Films and Sony Pictures Television
Family Tools	ABC	2013	co-production with The Mark Gordon Company and ABC Studios; Based on White Van Man by ITV Studios
Best Time Ever with Neil Patrick Harris	NBC	2015	co-production with Bill's Market & Television Productions and Prediction Productions
Good Witch	Hallmark Channel	2015–2021	co-production with Whizbang Films
Help Me Yelp	Food Network	2017–present	
Somewhere Between	ABC	2017	co-production with The Lion and The Rose and Thunderbird Entertainment; Based on the South Korean TV series God's Gift: 14 Days by Choi Ran
Crank Yankers	Comedy Central	2019–present	co-production with Kimmelot, Comedy Partners and MTV Entertainment Studios; Owned by Paramount Media Networks
Becoming	Disney+	2020–present	co-production with ESPN Films and Springhill Entertainment; Owned by Disney Platform Distribution
Rat in the Kitchen	TBS	2022–present	co-production with Possessed and Thinkfactory Media
Bullsh*t the Game Show	Netflix	2022–present	co-production with Nobody's Hero
The Prank Panel	ABC	2023–present	co-production with Kimmelot

=== ITV Entertainment ===
Title	Network	Years	Notes
The First 48	A&E	2004–present	
Hell's Kitchen USA	Fox	2005–present	co-production with A. Smith & Co. Productions
The Chase USA	GSN/ABC	2013–present	
Rich Kids of Beverly Hills	E!	2014–2016	co-production with Leepson Bounds Entertainment and E! Entertainment Television
EJNYC	E!	2016	co-production with GGTV, Leepson Bounds Entertainment and E! Entertainment Television
30 Something Grandma	Lifetime	2016	
Big Star Little Star	USA Network	2017–2018	co-production with Curly One Productions and USA Network Media Productions
The Four: Battle for Stardom	Fox	2018	co-production with Armoza Formats and Revolt Films
Queer Eye	Netflix	2018–present	Revival of the 2003 Bravo series, co-production with Scout Productions
Keep It Spotless	Nickelodeon	2018	co-production with Hard Nocks South Productions, Possessed, ITV Studios Global Entertainment and Nickelodeon Productions
Love Island USA	CBS/Peacock	2019–present	co-production with Motion Entertainment
Cannonball	USA Network	2020	co-production with ITV Studios and USA Network Media Productions
My Mom, Your Dad	HBO Max	2022	co-production with Rombola Entertainment and Daisy Doodle, Inc.

=== Granada Entertainment ===
Title	Network	Years	Notes
Cracker	ABC	1997–1998	co-production with The Kushner-Locke Company
Holding the Baby	Fox	1998	Based on the British show of the same name. Co-production with Howard J. Morris Productions and 20th Century Fox Television
Cold Feet	NBC	1999	
Boot Camp	Fox	2001	Co-produced with LMNO Productions and Boot Camp Productions

=== Granada America ===
Title	Network	Years	Notes
Eleventh Hour	CBS	2008–2009	co-production with Jerry Bruckheimer Television and Warner Bros. Television

=== Tomorrow Studios ===
Title	Network	Years	Notes
Aquarius	NBC	2015–2016	co-production with King Baby Productions, McNamara Moving Company and Fabrication (season 2)
Good Behavior	TNT	2016–2017	co-production with Storyland and Studio T
Hanna	Amazon Prime Video	2019–2021	co-production with NBCUniversal International Studios, Focus Features, Working Title Television and Amazon Studios; Owned by NBCUniversal
Snowpiercer	TNT; AMC	2020–2024	Based on the 2013 film of the same name by Bong Joon-ho. co-production with Studio T, CJ Entertainment and Dog Fish Films
Physical	Apple TV+	2021–present	Co-produced with Parasox, High Kick Productions, Nutbegger Inc and Fabrication
Ten Year Old Tom	HBO Max	2021–present	co-production with Work Friends, ShadowMachine and Insane Loon Productions
Cowboy Bebop	Netflix	2021	Based on the anime television series of the same name. Co-produced with Sunset Inc and Midnight Radio
Let the Right One In	Showtime	2022	Based on the best-selling novel by Swedish author John Ajvide Lindqvist. Originally was set up at A&E and was to be co-produced with A+E Studios, the project was then moved to TNT which was then to be co-produced by Studio T, the pilot didn't go into production and is currently being shopped to other networks
One Piece	Netflix	2023	Based on the manga of the same name by Eiichiro Oda. Co-production with Shueisha
The Persuaders	TBA	TBA	A revival of the 1971 ITV show of the same name. Co-produced with Fabrication
UnAmerican	TBA	TBA	Co-produced with Fabrication
Highland	TNT	TBA	Co-produced with Studio T, originally was set up at Amazon.
Trump: It Happened Here	TBA	TBA	

=== Leftfield Pictures ===
Title	Network	Years	Notes
The Principal's Office	TruTV	2008–2009	
Pawn Stars	History	2009–present	
Bridal Bootcamp	VH1	2010	
What The Sell?!	TLC	2010–2011	
American Restoration	History	2010–2016	
Oddities	Science	2010–2014	
Fashion Hunters	Bravo	2011	co-production with Bravo Media Productions; Owned by NBCUniversal Syndication Studios
Carfellas	Discovery Channel	2011	
Setup Squad	Logo TV	2011	
JUNKies	Science	2011	
Monster In-Laws	A&E	2011–2012	
Truck Stop USA	Travel Channel	2011–2012	
Ball Boys	ABC	2012	
Bid & Destroy	National Geographic	2012	
Swamp'd	Animal Planet	2012–2013	
Cajun Pawn Stars	History	2012–2013	
Odd Folks Home	Science	2012–2013	
Odditites: San Francisco	Science	2012–2013	
Counting Cars	History	2012–present	
Guntucky	CMT	2013–2014	co-production with Country Music Television, Inc. Owned by Paramount Media Networks
The Governor's Wife	A&E	2013	co-production with SSS Entertainment
City Sisters	Bravo	2013	
Hillbillies for Hire	CMT	2013	
Love Prison	A&E	2014	
Tobacco Wars	CMT	2014	
Clash of the Ozarks	Discovery Channel	2014	
United Stuff of America	H2	2014	
Celebrity Home Raiders	Lifetime	2014	co-production with DiGa Vision
Blood, Sweat & Heels	Bravo	2014–2015	co-production with Bravo Media Productions; Owned by NBCUniversal Syndication Studios
Pawnography	History	2014–2015	
Lachey's Bar	A&E	2015	
New Money	E!	2015	
Lost & Found	Discovery Family	2015	
Wrestling with Death	WGN America	2015	
Cutting It: In the ATL	We TV	2015–2016	
Alone	History	2015–present	
Pawn Stars Australia	A&E	2015	
Blue Collar Backers	Discovery Channel	2016–present	
Buddy's Family Vacation	Food Network	2016	co-production with Cakehouse Media
American Grit	Fox	2016–2017	co-production with Hard Nocks South Productions
Tackle My Ride	NFL Network	2016–present	co-production with SMAC Entertainment
The Book of John Gray	OWN	2017–2019	
Carspotting	Discovery Channel	2017	
Bethenny & Fredrik	Bravo	2018	co-production with B Real Productions
Let's Roll with Tony Greenland	Quibi	2020	co-production with Boomtown Content Co.
Chefs vs. Wild	Hulu	2022–present	co-production with Vox Media Studios

=== Sirens Media ===
Title	Network	Years	Notes
The Real Housewives of New Jersey	Bravo	2009–present	co-production with Bravo Media Productions
Who the (Bleep) Did I Marry?	Investigation Discovery	2010–2015	
Nightmare Next Door	Investigation Discovery	2011–present	
Boys to Manzo	Bravo	2011	co-production with Bravo Media Productions
Deadly Affairs	Investigation Discovery	2012–2014	
Who the (Bleep)...	Investigation Discovery	2013	
Thicker Than Water	Bravo	2013–2016	co-production with Bravo Media Productions and John Doe Media
Manzo'd with Children	Bravo	2014–2016	co-production with Bravo Media Productions
Killing Fields	Discovery Channel	2016–2017	
The Letter	Freeform	2016	
Lost Resort	TBS	2020	
The Wedding Coach	Netflix	2021	

=== Outpost Entertainment ===
Title	Network	Years	Notes
Icon	PBS	2014	
Brainstormers	The Weather Channel	2015	
Engineering Disasters	History	2015	
Forged in Fire	History	2015–present	
Car Hunters	History	2016–present	
Forged in Fire: Knife or Death	History	2018–2019	
Forged in Fire: Beat The Judges	History	2020	

=== Loud TV ===
Title	Network	Years
Tiny House Nation	FYI; A&E	2013–2019
Holy and Hungry	Cooking Channel	2014–2015
Food Porn	FYI	2015–2017

=== ThinkFactory Media ===
Title	Network	Years	Notes
Battleground Earth	Destination America	2008	co-production with The Greif Company
Rookies	A&E	2008–2009	co-production with Tiger Aspect Productions
Dogg After Dark	MTV	2009	co-production with Boutique Television and Snoopadelic Pictures
Hatfield & McCoys	History	2012	co-production with Sony Pictures Television
Preachers' Daughters	Lifetime	2013–2015	
Marriage Boot Camp	We TV	2013–present	co-production with September Films
4th and Loud	AMC	2014	co-production with AMC Studios
Queens of Drama	Pop	2015	
Texas Rising	History	2015	co-production with ITV Studios America and A+E Studios
Surviving Compton: Dre, Suge & Michel'le	Lifetime	2016	
Sun Records	CMT	2017	
Mama June: From Not to Hot	We TV	2017–2021	
Rats in the Kitchen	TBS	2022–present	co-production with ITV America and Possessed

=== Twofour America ===
Title	Network	Years	Notes
Edge of Alaska	Discovery Channel	2014–2017	
A Night With My Ex	Bravo	2017	co-production with Bravo Media Productions

=== Gurney Productions ===
Title	Network	Years	Notes
I Was Bitten	Discovery Channel	2008	
Feeding Frenzy	Discovery Channel	2008	
Wild Recon	Animal Planet	2010	
I'm Alive	Animal Planet	2009–2011	
Speed of Life	Discovery Channel	2010	
Hollywood Treasure	Syfy	2010–2012	co-production with Zupon Entertainment
Auction Hunters	Spike	2010–2015	co-production with Spike Cable Networks
Monster Man	Syfy	2012	
American Digger	Spike	2012–2013	co-production with Spike Cable Networks
Duck Dynasty	A&E	2012–2017	
Porter Ridge	Discovery Channel	2013	
LeAnn & Eddie	VH1	2014	co-production with Octagon Entertainment Corporation and Maniac Creative
Leah Remini: It's All Relative	TLC	2014–2015	
Sons of Winter	Discovery Channel	2015	
Ghosts in the Hood	WE tv	2016	
Jep & Jessica: Growing the Dynasty	A&E	2016–2017	
Going Si-ral	A&E	2016–2017	

=== High Noon Entertainment ===
Title	Network	Years	Notes
Kicked Out	ABC Family	2005	
I Want to Save Your Life	WE tv	2009	
Cake Boss	TLC/Discovery Family	2009–2020	Co-produced with Cakehouse Media
Tough Love	VH1	2009–2013	Co-produced with Flower Films
Along for the Bride	TLC	2012	
Collection Intervention	Syfy	2012	
Hurricane Hunters	The Weather Channel	2012–2013	
Trip Flip	Travel Channel	2012–2015	
Xtreme Waterparks	Travel Channel	2012–present	
Ride-iculous	Travel Channel	2013	
Prospectors	The Weather Channel	2013–2016	
Guinness World Records Gone Wild	truTV	2013–2014	
Fixer Upper	HGTV/Magnolia Network	2013–present	
The Line	GSN	2014	Originally was to be a series, it instead was aired as a two‑hour pilot
Taco Trip	Cooking Channel	2014–2015	
Branson Taxi	Reelz	2015	
Polka Kings	Reelz	2015	
Dr. Dee: Alaska Vet	Animal Planet	2015–2016	
Ayesha's Home Kitchen	Food Network	2016–present	
Good Bones	HGTV	2016–present	
Life at Vet U	Animal Planet	2016–present	
Playhouse Masters	TLC	2016–2017	
Sweet 15: Quinceañera	TLC	2016–present	
One of a Kind	HGTV	2019–present	
Saved by the Barn	Animal Planet	2020	
Fixer Upper: Welcome Home	Discovery+	2021–present	
Houses with History	HGTV	2021–present	
Mash-Up Our Home	HGTV	2022–present	
Why the Heck Did I Buy This House?	HGTV	2022–present	
How to Build a Sex Room	Netflix	2022–present	

==== Red Bandit Media ====
Title	Network	Years
Texas Cake House	Food Network	2017

== ITV Studios Global Distribution ==
Title	Network	Years	Notes
Jeden z dziesięciu	TVP2/TVP1	1994-present	co-production with Euromedia TV and TVP3 Lublin Based on Fifteen to One by Channel 4
Pasapalabra	Antena 3/Telecinco	2000–present	co-production with Buendía Estudios and Boomerang TV; Based on The Alphabet Game by Objective Media Group
Durham County	Movie Central/The Movie Network	2007–2010	co-production with Muse Entertainment and Back Alley Film Productions
Murdoch Mysteries	City/CBC	2008–present	co-production with Shaftesbury Films, Rogers Media (seasons 1–5) and UKTV
Grizzly Tales	Nicktoons	2011–2012	co-production with Honeycomb Animation and Little Brother Productions
Good Witch	Hallmark Channel	2015–2021	co-production with Whizbang Films
Tricked	YTV/BYUtv	2016–2019	co-production with Force Four Entertainment
Harlots	ITV Encore/Lionsgate+ Hulu	2017–2019	co-production with Monumental Pictures
Keep It Spotless	Nickelodeon	2018	co-production with ITV Entertainment, Possessed, Nickelodeon Productions and Hard Knocks South Productions
La Divina Comida	Chilevisión	201?-202?	

== ITV Studios Australia ==
Programs shaded in green are ongoing programs.

Title	Network	Years	Notes
Fast forward	Seven Network	1989–1992	
Tonight Live with Steve Vizard	Seven Network	1990–1993	
Full Frontal	Seven Network; Network Ten	1993–1997; 1998–1999	
Big Girl's Blouse	Seven Network	1994–1995	
SeaChange	ABC; Nine Network	1998–2000; 2019	
The Micallef P(r)ogram(me)	ABC	1998–2001	
Merrick and Rosso Unplanned	Nine Network	2003–2004	
Dancing with the Stars	Seven Network	2004–2007	First seven seasons only.
Australian Princess	Network Ten	2005–2007	
Australia's Next Top Model	Fox8	2005–2010	First six seasons only.
An Aussie Goes Barmy	Fox8	2006	
An Aussie Goes Bolly	Fox8	2008	
Battle of the Choirs	Seven Network	2008	
An Aussie Goes Calypso	Fox8	2008	
Talkin' 'Bout Your Generation	Network Ten (2009–2012; 2025); Nine Network (2018–2019)	2009–2012; 2018–2019; 2025	
Four Weddings	Seven Network	2010	
The Trophy Room	ABC	2010	
Come Dine with Me Australia	Lifestyle Food	2010–2013	
Young Talent Time	Network Ten	2012	2012 reboot
Please Marry My Boy	Seven Network	2012–2013	
Celebrity Come Dine With Me Australia	LifeStyle Food	2012–2014	
Shaun Micallef's Mad as Hell	ABC	2012–2022	Co-production with Giant Baby Productions
Off Their Rockers	The Comedy Channel	2013	
Come Date with Me	Network Ten	2013–2014	
Paddock to Plate	LifeStyle Food	2013–2014	
I'm a Celebrity...Get Me Out of Here!	Network Ten	2015–present	
The Chase Australia	Seven Network	2015–present	
Keeping Australia Alive	ABC	2016	
noma Australia	SBS	2016	
The Voice Australia	Nine Network (2012–2020); Seven Network (since 2021)	2017–present	Co-production with Eureka Productions. Previous seasons produced by Endemol Shine Australia.
Hell's Kitchen Australia	Seven Network	2017	
Cannonball	Seven Network	2017	
Cram!	Network Ten	2017	
Think Tank	ABC	2017	
Love Island Australia	9Go!	2018–present	
The Cube	Network Ten	2021	
Celebrity Letters and Numbers	SBS	2021–present	
My Mum, Your Dad	Nine Network	2022–present	
Australia Behind Bars	Nine Network	2022	
Alone Australia	SBS	2023–present	
Inside Sydney Airport	SBS	2023–present	
Shaun Micallef's Eve of Destruction	ABC	2024–present	Co-production with Giant Baby Productions

== ITV Studios Germany ==
Title	Network	Years	Notes
Das perfekte Dinner	VOX	2006–present	Based on Come Dine with Me
Die Kocharena	VOX	2007–2013	
4 Hochzeiten und eine Traumreise	VOX	2012–present	
Gefragt – Gejagt	NDR Fernsehen	2012–present	
Grill den Henssler	VOX	2013–present	
Quizduell	Das Erste	2014–present	Based on the application of the same name
Meet The Parents	RTL	TBA	

=== Granada Germany ===
Title	Network	Years	Notes
Frauenzimmer	VOX	2009	Based on the format of Loose Women

== ITV Studios France ==
Title	Network	Years	Notes
Quatre mariages pour une lune de miel	TF1/TFX	2011–present	
Aline au pays des merveilles	France Ô	2011–2014	
Le Bus	M6	2012	
Qui chante le plus juste ?	France 4	2013	
Dis-moi oui	TF6	2013	
Tout peut arriver	M6	2015	
Hell's Kitchen France	NT1	2016	
5 anneaux d'or	France 2	2017–2018	
Je t'aime, etc.	France 2	2017–2020	Co-production with Martange Production
Destination Eurovision	France 2	2018–2019	
The Voice – La plus belle voix	TF1	2018–present	Previous seasons produced by Endemol Shine France
Les Plus Belles Mariées	TF1	2018–2020	
The Voice Kids	TF1	2018–present	Previous seasons produced by Endemol Shine France
Spectaculaire	France 2	2020–2022	Co-production with Kiosco.TV
Nabilla : Sans Filtre	Prime Video	2021	Co-production with Banijay Productions
Welcome Back	TF1	2022-present	Co-production with Ellimac Productions
Cosmic Love France	Prime Video	2023	
Ma mère, ton père, l'amour et moi	TF1	2023	
La Photo parfaite	M6	2023	
Destination X : sauront-ils se repérer ?	M6	2023–present	
Comedy Class	Prime Video	2024–present	

== Television films and specials ==
=== ITV Studios ===
- My Friend Michael Jackson: Uri's Story (2009)
- Joanna Lumley: Catwoman (2009)
- Miscarriage: Our Story (2020)

==== Granada Productions ====
- Stalin: Inside the Terror (2003)
- Middle Sexes: Redefining He & She (2005)
- Whatever Love Means (2005)
- Titanic: Birth of a Legend (2005)
- Dracula (2006) (co-production with WGBH Boston)

===== Yorkshire Television =====
- A Is for Acid (2002)
- The Brides in the Bath (2003)

==== Carlton Television ====
- Goodnight Mister Tom (1998)
- Cider with Rosie (1998)
- The Railway Children (2000)
- Blue Murder (2000)

===== ITC Entertainment =====
- Julie on Sesame Street (1973) (co-production with Associated Television)
- Les Misérables (1978)
- Jennifer: A Woman's Story (1979)
- All Quiet on the Western Front (1979)
- The Scarlet and the Black (1983) (co-production with RAI and Bill McCutchen Productions)
- Jane Doe (1983)
- Sunset Limousine (1983)
- Secrets of a Married Man (1984) (co-production with RAI)
- Unnatural Causes (1986)
- Christmas Comes to Willow Creek (1987) (co-production with Blue Andre Productions)
- Fear Stalk (1989) (co-production with Donald March Productions)
- Her Wicked Ways (1991) (co-production with Lois Luger Productions, Freyda Rothstein Productions and Bar-Gene Productions
- When Love Kills: The Seduction of John Heran (1993) (co-production with Harvey Kahn Productions, McGillen Entertainment and Alexander Enright & Associates)

==== Lifted Entertainment ====
- University Challenge at 60 (2022)

==== Twofour ====
- Ginger Nation (2002)
- Crip on a Trip (2006)
- Fame Asylum (2006)
- The British Suck in Bed (2008)
- 100 Greatest Toys (2010)
- Graffiti Wars (2011) (co-production with One Productions)
- Dogs on a Dole (2015)
- My Big Fat Wedding (2015)

==== Possessed ====
- Spotless (2016)

==== Multistory Media ====
- Goodbye Balance (2010)
- Paul McCartney & Wings: Band on the Run (2010)
- The Betty Driver Story (2011) (co-production with Table Twelve Media)
- Farewell Liz (2011)
- When Ali Came to Britain (2012)
- William & Kate: The First Year (2012)
- Channel 4's 30 Greatest Comedy Shows (2012)
- 30 Years of CITV (2012)
- Being Poriot (2013) (co-production with Acorn Productions and Agatha Christie Ltd.)
- Coronation Street: A Moving Story (2014)
- Michael Flatley: A Night to Remember (2014)
- Gail & Me: 40 Years on Coronation Street (2014)
- Executed (2014)
- Trawlerman's Lives (2014)
- Hot Tub Britain (2014)
- Churchill: 100 Days That Saved Britain (2015)
- The Nation's Favourite 70s Number One (2015)
- Reggie & Thunderbirds: No Strings Attached (2015)
- Unforgettable Election Moments: 60 Years On (2015)
- The Magic Show Story (2015)
- Let's Do It: A Tribute to Victoria Wood (2016)
- The Natives: This Is Our America (2017)
- Coronation Street Special: From Here to Now (2018)
- Return to Belsen (2020)
- Hitched at Home: Our Lockdown Wedding (2020)
- Stephen Lawrence: Has Britain Changed? (2020)
- The Real 'Des': The Dennis Nilsen Story (2020)
- Flying for Britain with David Jason (2020)
- Carols at Christmas (2020)
- How to Catch a Cat Killer (2022)
- The Young Elizabeth (2022)
- Charles: The Monarch and the Man (2022)

==== The Garden ====
- The Merits of Ferrets (2012)
- Crucifixion (2012)
- The Kidnap Diaries (2012)
- Kicked Out Kids (2012)
- Who Killed Sharon Birchwood? Police Tapes (2018)
- Spying On My Family (2018)
- Mars: One Day on the Red Planet (2020)
- The Unshockable Dr. Ronx (2020)
- Henry VIII & Trump: History Repeating? (2020)
- April Jones: The Interrogation Tapes (2020)

==== Gameface ====
- Groundhog Date (2019)

==== World Productions ====
- Wide-Eyed and Legless (1993)
- Hostile Waters (1997)
- Perfect Day: The Wedding (2005)
- Perfect Day: The Millennium (2006)
- Perfect Day: The Funeral (2006)
- Hancock and Joan (2008)
- United (2011)

=== ITV America ===
- Perfectly Prudence (2011)

==== Thinkfactory Media ====
- Dating Game Killer (2018)
- The Lover in the Attic: A True Story (2018)
- A Lover Scorned (2019) (co-production with Swirl Films)

==== Carlton America ====
- Half a Dozen Babies (1999)
- A Secret Affair (1999)
- The Test of Love (1999)
- Murder in the Mirror (2000) (co-production with Catfish Productions and Larry Thompson Entertainment)
- Love Lessons (2000) (co-production with Carla Singer Productions)
- The Christmas Secret (2000) (co-production with CBS Productions)
- The Wandering Soul Murders (2001)
- The Triangle (2001) (co-production with George Street Productions and Orly Anderson Productions)
- The Wedding Dress (2001) (co-production with Sarabande Productions)
- Dead in a Heartbeat (2002)
- Seconds to Spare (2002)
- Atomic Twister (2002)
- Scent of Danger (2002)
- Murder in Greenwich (2002)
- Rudy: The Rudy Giuliani Story (2003)
- Lucky 7 (2003)
- Code 11–14 (2003)
- Rush of Fear (2003)
- Blessings (2003)
- Undercover Christmas (2003)
- Maiden Voyage Ocean Hijack (2004)

==== Granada America ====
- The Survivors Club (2004)
- The Dead Will Tell (2004) (co-production with Barbara Lieberman Productions, One Light Productions and Robert Greenwald Productions)
- Odd Girl Out (2005) (co-production with Lift Production Services and Jaffe/Braunstein Films)
- Heartless (2005) (co-production with Grossbart Kent Productions)
- Murder on Pleasant Drive (2006) (co-production with Dan Wigutow Productions and KZ Productions)
- Firestorm: Last Stand at Yellowstone (2006)
- Life Is Not a Fairy Tale: The Fantasia Barrino Story (2006) (co-production with Lift Productions and Ostar Productions)
- Why I Wore Lipstick to My Mastectomy (2006)
- Santa Baby (2006)
- Wide Awake (2007) (co-production with Chesler/Pearlmutter Productions)
- Housesitter (2007) (co-production with Sound Venture and Muse Entertainment)
- Write & Wrong (2007) (co-production with Jaffe/Braunstein Films)
- Matters of Life and Dating (2007)
- Love Sick: Secrets of a Sex Addict (2008)
- True Confessions of a Go-Go Girl (2008) (co-production with Nomadic Pictures and Go-Go Productions)
- Dear Prudence (2008) (co-production with Alberta Film Entertainment and Alexander/Mitchell Productions)
- The One That Got Away (2008) (co-production with Pope Productions and Shaftesbury Films)
- Toxic Skies (2008) (co-production with Ignite Entertainment and Johnson Production Group)
- Moonlight and Mistletoe (2008)
- The Christmas Choir (2008) (co-production with Tower Pictures and Muse Entertainment)
- The Most Wonderful Time of the Year (2008)
- A Very Merry Daughter of the Bride (2008)
- What Color is Love? (2009)
- Diverted (2009)
- Storm Seekers (2009)

==== Leftfield Pictures ====
- Hallmark Heroes with Regis Philbin (2008)
- Billy the Kid: New Evidence (2015)
- Brain Surgery Live with Mental Floss (2015)
- Killer Curves: Bodies to Die For (2018)

==== Tomorrow Studios ====
- The Fluffy Shop (2016) (co-production with ABC Signature Studios)
- Dan the Weatherman (2018) (co-production with 20th Century Fox Television)

==== High Noon Entertainment ====
- Life After Katrina (2006)
- Stud Finder (2009)
- Nick & Vanessa's Dream Wedding (2011)
- HGTV: Making of Our Magazine (2011)
- Pumpkin Palooza (2011)
- Cheap Bites (2012)
- Trip of a Lifetime (2013)
- Disney Cruise Line: Behind the Magic (2013)
- Walt Disney World Resort Hotels (2014)
- The 12 Foods of Christmas (2016)
- Halloween Craziet (2021)

=== ITV Studios Global Entertainment ===
Title	Network	Years	Notes
The Pregnancy Pact	Lifetime	2010	Co-produced with Von Zerneck Sertner Films
The Night Before the Night Before Christmas	Hallmark Channel	2010	Co-produced with Muse Entertainment
