= ITV Studios Australia =

Australian television production company

- Formerly: Artist Services (1989–1998); Granada Australia (1998–2013)
- Type: Subsidiary
- Industry: Television
- Genre: Television production
- Founded: 1989; 37 years ago
- Headquarters: Sydney
- Area served: Australia
- Key people: David Mott (CEO and managing director)
- Services: Television program production
- Parent: ITV Studios (1998–present)
- Website: itvstudios.com.au

ITV Studios Australia is an Australian television production company and the Australian arm of UK company ITV Studios. It was formed as Artist Services in 1989, later becoming Granada Media Australia before being rebranded to its current name in 2013.

The company produces or co-produces numerous Australian television programs across commercial television, public broadcasters and subscription television in Australia. ITV Studios Australia is based at Fox Studios Australia in Sydney.

== History ==
The company has its origins in production company Artist Services, a company formed in 1989 by a group of investors including Steve Vizard, producing many shows such as Fast forward, Full Frontal, SeaChange and Tonight Live with Steve Vizard. Half of the company was sold to John Fairfax Holdings in 1995 for A$9 million, at a time when the company was generating about A$50 million per year. In 1998, the entire company was acquired by Granada for A$25 million.

Under the Granada Media Australia banner, the company produced a variety of programs including the first seven seasons of the Seven Network's Dancing with the Stars (2004–2007); Nine Network's Merrick & Rosso Unplanned (2003); six seasons of Fox8's Australia's Next Top Model; Ten's Australian Princess (2005–2007), Talkin' 'Bout Your Generation (2009–2012, 2018–2019) and reboot of Young Talent Time (2012); Lifestyle Channel's Come Dine with Me Australia.

The company rebranded as ITV Studios Australia in January 2013, with the first program carrying the new branding being the second season of ABC comedy program Shaun Micallef's Mad as Hell.

Under the ITV Studios name, productions include LifeStyle Channel's Paddock to Plate (2013–2014), Seven game show The Chase Australia (2015–present), Ten's I'm a Celebrity...Get Me Out of Here! (2015–2026) and the sixth season onwards of Nine's The Voice Australia (2017–present).

== Productions ==
Programs with a shaded background indicate the program is still in production.

Title	Network	Years	Notes
Fast forward	Seven Network	1989–1992	
Tonight Live with Steve Vizard	Seven Network	1990–1993	
Full Frontal	Seven Network; Network Ten	1993–1997; 1998–1999	
Big Girl's Blouse	Seven Network	1994–1995	
SeaChange	ABC; Nine Network	1998–2000; 2019	
The Micallef P(r)ogram(me)	ABC	1998–2001	
Merrick and Rosso Unplanned	Nine Network	2003–2004	
Dancing with the Stars	Seven Network	2004–2007	First seven seasons only.
Australian Princess	Network Ten	2005–2007	
Australia's Next Top Model	Fox8	2005–2010	First six seasons only.
An Aussie Goes Barmy	Fox8	2006	
An Aussie Goes Bolly	Fox8	2008	
Battle of the Choirs	Seven Network	2008	
An Aussie Goes Calypso	Fox8	2008	
Talkin' 'Bout Your Generation	Network Ten (2009–2012; 2025); Nine Network (2018–2019)	2009–2012; 2018–2019; 2025	
Four Weddings	Seven Network	2010	
The Trophy Room	ABC	2010	
Come Dine with Me Australia	Lifestyle Food	2010–2013	
Young Talent Time	Network Ten	2012	2012 reboot
Please Marry My Boy	Seven Network	2012–2013	
Celebrity Come Dine With Me Australia	LifeStyle Food	2012–2014	
Shaun Micallef's Mad as Hell	ABC	2012–2022	Co-production with Giant Baby Productions
Off Their Rockers	The Comedy Channel	2013	
Come Date with Me	Network Ten	2013–2014	
Paddock to Plate	LifeStyle Food	2013–2014	
I'm a Celebrity...Get Me Out of Here!	Network Ten	2015–2026	
The Chase Australia	Seven Network	2015–present	
Keeping Australia Alive	ABC	2016	
noma Australia	SBS	2016	
The Voice Australia	Nine Network (2012–2020); Seven Network (since 2021)	2017–present	Co-production with Eureka Productions. Previous seasons produced by Endemol Shine Australia.
Hell's Kitchen Australia	Seven Network	2017	
Cannonball	Seven Network	2017	
Cram!	Network Ten	2017	
Think Tank	ABC	2017	
Love Island Australia	9Go!	2018–present	
The Cube	Network Ten	2021	
Celebrity Letters and Numbers	SBS	2021–present	
Australia Behind Bars	Nine Network	2022	
My Mum, Your Dad	Nine Network	2022–2023	
My Kitchen Rules	Seven Network	2022–present	Prior seasons produced by Seven Productions.
Alone Australia	SBS	2023–present	
Inside Sydney Airport	SBS	2023–present	
Shaun Micallef's Eve of Destruction	ABC	2024–2025	Co-production with Giant Baby Productions
Shark!	Nine Network	2026–present	
