= Seed Productions =

American film studio

- Industry: Film
- Founded: 2004; 22 years ago
- Founders: Hugh Jackman; Deborra-Lee Furness
- Defunct: 2010; 16 years ago
- Fate: Closed

Seed Productions was a film production company associated with 20th Century Fox, started by Australian actors Hugh Jackman and Deborra-Lee Furness, with producer and business partner John Palermo.

The company's headquarters were located at the 20th Century Fox lot at Century City, Los Angeles, California, however an Australian office was opened in 2006 at Fox Studios Australia in Sydney. Seed's first planned project was X-Men Origins: Wolverine, a film detailing the origins of the character Wolverine played by Jackman in the X-Men film series. Wolverine was scheduled to begin filming just after completion of the third film in the series, X-Men: The Last Stand, but production delays delayed principal filming in New Zealand until January 18, 2008. In the meantime, the company produced The List starring Ewan McGregor, three cricket documentaries starring Jackman's best friend Gus Worland, and the short-lived television series Viva Laughlin.

Seed Productions closed in 2010, with Jackman deciding to focus on his acting career, while Palermo would have a new producing deal at 20th Century Fox.

== Filmography ==
- Deception (2008)
- X-Men Origins: Wolverine (2009)

== Television productions ==
- An Aussie Goes Barmy (2006)
- Viva Laughlin (2007)
- An Aussie Goes Calypso (2008)
- An Aussie Goes Bolly (2008)
