= Take the Tower =

Take the Tower may refer to:

- "Take the Tower" (Battle for Dream Island), a 2020 web series episode
- Take the Tower, a 2018 British game show produced by ITV Studios
