= Off Their Rockers =

Off Their Rockers may refer to:

- Betty White's Off Their Rockers, an American reality comedy television series
- Off Their Rockers (Australian TV series), a 2013 Australian comedy television series
- Off Their Rockers (British TV series), a 2013 British hidden camera sketch series
