= Gus Worland =

Australian television and radio presenter

- Occupations: Television and radio host
- Known for: An Aussie Goes TV series Host on The Grill Team on Triple M Sydney

Gus Worland is an Australian television and radio personality. He worked on Triple M breakfast radio from 2009 to 2019, and on a series of reality television programs: Man Up on the ABC, An Aussie Goes Barmy, An Aussie Goes Bolly and An Aussie Goes Calypso which aired on Fox8.

== Early life ==
Worland grew up in Sydney, Australia. He attended Knox Grammar School, where he met lifelong friend Hugh Jackman. During his schooling, Worland played a number of sports and was heavily involved with the extracurricular activities at Knox Grammar School. After graduating from high school with honours, he worked in sales with Toshiba. After marrying wife Vicky in England, they returned to Australia, later had three children and Worland's media career began.

== Media career ==
=== Television ===
With Hugh Jackman, Worland co-created and starred in Fox8's An Aussie Goes series, following the Australian cricket team around the world. The first series in 2006 was An Aussie Goes Barmy. His mission was to follow the Barmy Army from England to Australia for all five cricket test matches. The next series was An Aussie Goes Bolly in India. The third series brought Worland to the West Indies for An Aussie Goes Calypso. He had a program on A&E Australia called Gus Worland: Marathon Man. Together with Julia Morris he hosted The Singing Office which won an ASTRA Award for Best Entertainment Program that year.

=== Radio ===
Worland spent 10 years in breakfast radio on Triple M Sydney. Starting on The Grill Team in 2009. He was awarded 'Best on Air Newcomer' at the 2010 Australian Commercial Radio Awards. The Grill Team changed to Moon Man in the Morning in 2019. In 2020, Worland joined The Deadset Legends with Jude Bolton and Wendell Sailor live each Saturday morning on Triple M.

Worland is also a regular contributor on The Today Show, often appearing alongside Government Services Minister Bill Shorten.

== Charity – Gotcha4Life ==
Worland founded Gotcha4Life in 2017, following the success of the ABC series Man Up.

== Awards ==
Worland has won two ASTRA Awards: one for Best Entertainment Show in 2007 for his role as Team Leader in Fox8's The Singing Office and the second in 2008 when he was awarded Best Sports Show on Pay TV for An Aussie Goes Bolly. Worland was recognised as the Best Newcomer On-Air in the Metropolitan Division at the 2010 Australian Commercial Radio Awards. He has won the Best Documentary on Australian Radio twice, in 2015 and 2019.
