= Autopsy: The Last Hours of... =

- Genre: Documentary
- Presented by: Dr. Richard Shepherd (United Kingdom); Dr. Jason Payne-James (United Kingdom); Dr. Michael Hunter (United States); Emmy Kenny (United Kingdom); Dr. Anjula Mutanda (United Kingdom); Dr. Linda Papadopoulos (Canada)
- Narrated by: Steven Mackintosh (United Kingdom); Iain Glen (United Kingdom); Eric Meyers (United States)
- Countries of origin: United Kingdom; United States
- Original language: English
- No. of seasons: 14
- No. of episodes: 164

Production
- Executive producers: Ed Taylor; Michael Kelpie
- Running time: 60 minutes
- Production company: Potato

Original release
- Network: Channel 5 (United Kingdom); Reelz (United States)
- Release: 7 January 2014 – 4 June 2023

Autopsy: The Last Hours of... is a British-American documentary-style television series that investigates the tragic, controversial and sudden deaths of celebrities. The series debuted in 2014 on Channel 5 in the United Kingdom and was later broadcast in the United States by Reelz. In 2016, the first American produced season of Autopsy aired with San Francisco's chief medical examiner (who was previously Panama City, Florida's District 14 medical examiner), Dr. Michael Hunter taking over as the host. The UK produced episodes featured Dr. Richard Shepherd and subsequently (after about the first ten episodes), Dr. Jason Payne-James (for about five more episodes) analyzing the official autopsy reports of various celebrities to determine their cause of death.

== Controversy ==
The series received backlash for its explicit depiction of death.

== See also ==
- Autopsy (HBO series)
- Final 24
