= Kati Psinete =

- Greek: Κάτι Ψήνεται
- Based on: "Come Dine with Me"
- Country of origin: Greece
- Original language: Greek
- No. of seasons: 12

Kati Psinete (Greek: Κάτι Ψήνεται) (meaning Something's cooking) is a popular cookery show. It's the Greek edition of the show Come Dine with Me (UK). It began airing on Alpha TV in 2009 for 8 seasons. From January 2019 it broadcasting on ANT1 TV and is continuing today with great success, according to AGB.
