= Michael Hunter (forensic pathologist) =

American forensic pathologist

MD Michael Hunter

Chief Medical Examiner of San Joaquin County
- Incumbent
- Assumed office 2019

Chief Medical Examiner of San Francisco
- In office 2015–2019

Florida's District 14 Chief Medical Examiner
- In office 2008–2015

Personal details
- Born: Michael D. Hunter; 1966 or 1967 (age 58–59)
- Children: 1
- Education: Medical University of South Carolina (M.D.)
- Occupation: Medical examiner Television host
- Known for: Autopsy: The Last Hours of...

Michael D. Hunter is an American forensic pathologist is best known for his appearances in the television show Autopsy: The Last Hours of....

== Career ==
=== Education ===
Hunter graduated medical school at Medical University of South Carolina, and later completed residencies at Oregon Health & Science University, Baylor College of Medicine, the Miami-Dade County Office of Medical Examiner. He holds a current medical license in California and, up until January 2020, in Florida. He is certified by the American Board of Pathology in anatomic pathology, clinical pathology and forensic pathology.

=== Medical examiner ===
Hunter has over 21 years of experience as a medical examiner.

He began to serve as Florida's District 14 medical examiner in Panama City in 2008. During his time serving as Florida's District 14 medical examiner, Hunter testified in several serious criminal trials. However, he left his position in Florida, in spring 2015, to serve as the Chief Medical Examiner in San Francisco. When he took the position, there was a large back log of cases, and Hunter, through organizational changes, was able to lower that back log. In 2019, Hunter resigned as Chief Medical Examiner in San Francisco and took the position of Chief Medical Examiner in San Joaquin County.

=== Television ===
Hunter has served as a consultant on several television programs, including Anderson Cooper 360, The Nancy Grace Show, Larry King Live, TruTV, CNN Newsroom, and programs on the Fox News Channel. Additionally, he was the host of The Riddle of the Crucifixion.

Most notably, Hunter is the host of Autopsy: The Last Hours of... on the Reelz network, where he examines the causes behind celebrity deaths.

== Personal life ==
Hunter was born in December 1966. He is married and has one son.
