= The Trophy Room =

- Genre: Comedy/Sports/Game show
- Created by: Granada Australia
- Presented by: Peter Helliar
- Starring: Amanda Shalala; Adam Spencer
- Country of origin: Australia
- Original language: English
- No. of seasons: 1
- No. of episodes: 9

Production
- Production locations: Sydney, New South Wales
- Running time: 30 minutes
- Production company: Granada Media Australia

Original release
- Network: ABC1
- Release: 14 December 2010 – 2 February 2011

The Trophy Room is an Australian sport-themed comedic television quiz show which first screened in 2010 on ABC1.

The show is hosted by stand-up comedian Peter Helliar, who poses questions to two teams headed by sports journalist Amanda Shalala and broadcaster Adam Spencer.
