= Please Marry My Boy =

- Genre: Reality television
- Presented by: Ada Nicodemou
- Country of origin: Australia
- Original language: English
- No. of seasons: 2
- No. of episodes: 19

Production
- Running time: 60 mins (inc. commercials)
- Production company: Granada Media Australia

Original release
- Network: Seven Network
- Release: 30 January 2012 – 19 September 2013

Please Marry My Boy was an Australian reality television series which premiered on the Seven Network on 30 January 2012. The show is hosted by Ada Nicodemou and produced by Granada Australia. The first series concluded on 2 April 2013.

The series was renewed for a second season which premiered on 29 July 2013 at 9:00pm.

== Format ==
In each episode, four mothers are given the task of finding their sons a female romantic partner which the son cannot seemingly find themselves. Together, the mothers and their respective sons meet ten women. The mothers will then select their top three candidates. The chosen females are later given the unexpected news; that they are moving in with the son and his mother.

== Episodes ==
=== Season 1 (2012) ===
| No. | Title | Original release date | Australian viewers (millions) |
|---|---|---|---|
| 1 | "Episode 1" | 30 January 2012 | 1.252 |
| 2 | "Episode 2" | 6 February 2012 | 1.174 |
| 3 | "Episode 3" | 15 February 2012 | 1.036 |
| 4 | "Episode 4" | 22 February 2012 | 1.026 |
| 5 | "Episode 5" | 29 February 2012 | 1.084 |
| 6 | "Episode 6" | 7 March 2012 | 1.017 |
| 7 | "Episode 7" | 14 March 2012 | 1.022 |
| 8 | "Episode 8" | 21 March 2012 | 0.985 |
| 9 | "Episode 9" | 28 March 2012 | 1.089 |

=== Season 2 (2013) ===
| No. | Title | Original release date | Australian viewers |
|---|---|---|---|
| 1 | "Episode 1" | 29 July 2013 | 0.908 |
| 2 | "Episode 2" | 1 August 2013 | 0.620 |
| 3 | "Episode 3" | 8 August 2013 | 0.656 |
| 4 | "Episode 4" | 15 August 2013 | N/A |
| 5 | "Episode 5" | 22 August 2013 | N/A |
| 6 | "Episode 6" | 29 August 2013 | 0.537 |
| 7 | "Episode 7" | 5 September 2013 | N/A |
| 8 | "Episode 8" | 12 September 2013 | N/A |
| 9 | "Episode 9" | 19 September 2013 | N/A |
| 10 | "Episode 10" | 19 September 2013 | N/A |
