= Win the Wilderness: Alaska =

- Genre: Reality
- Judges: Duane and Rena Ose
- Voices of: Nicholas Tennant
- Country of origin: United Kingdom
- Original language: English
- No. of series: 1
- No. of episodes: 6

Production
- Production locations: Alaska, United States
- Production company: Twofour

Original release
- Network: BBC Two
- Release: 26 January – 1 March 2020

Win the Wilderness: Alaska is a British television competition, produced by Twofour, in which six British couples compete each other in a series of rounds, attempting to impress the elderly couple owning a homestead near the Denali National Park in Alaska.

== Ose mountain ==
The prize of the competition is the deed to the Alaskan homestead of Duane and Rena Ose. Duane Ose hiked to the homestead in 1982. He claims to have been the last homesteader in the US filing a claim under the Homestead Act of 1862 in 1986. The Oses built the homestead they call Ose Mountain up by hand using trunks felled from their forest. The homestead is about 100 miles away from the nearest road and can be accessed only with a plane to its own airfield.

After the show the winners, Mark and Emily, first were on good terms with the previous owners of the homestead, but more recently the previous owner, Duane Ose, is reported to have been demanding the homestead back. Mark and Emily said on their Facebook account they returned the homestead back to Duane due to him having built it. Sadly Rena has since passed and shortly after Duane remarried a younger woman. She was not accepted by the Ose family and allegedly was previously married three times to much older men.
