= Celebrity Come Dine With Me Australia =

- Genre: Cooking
- Narrated by: James Valentine
- Country of origin: Australia
- Original language: English
- No. of seasons: 2
- No. of episodes: 6

Production
- Running time: 30 minutes
- Production company: ITV Studios Australia

Original release
- Network: The LifeStyle Channel (2012–14)
- Release: 11 December 2012 – 28 January 2014

Related
- Come Dine with Me; Come Dine with Me Australia

Celebrity Come Dine With Me Australia is a celebrity version of the Australian television reality cooking series based on the Come Dine with Me format which premiered on 11 December 2012 on The LifeStyle Channel in Australia, as a spin-off to Come Dine with Me Australia. It is narrated by James Valentine.

== Series Summary ==
| Season | Episodes | Originally Aired | |
| Season | Episodes | First | Last |
|---|---|---|---|
| Specials | 2 | 11 December 2012 | 1 December 2013 |
| One | 4 | 7 January 2014 | 28 January 2014 |

== History ==
In 2009, The LifeStyle Channel bought the rights to Come Dine with Me, commissioning Granada Media Australia to produce a version for the Australian market. The first season consists of 20 episodes. A second season was approved before the first season premiered and was broadcast in mid-2010. A fourth season was commissioned in 2012 with a celebrity Christmas special to screen prior to the fourth season. A second Christmas celebrity special was commissioned which aired in December 2013 along with a full celebrity season which aired in 2014.

=== Cancelled Revival ===
The series was set to be revived in 2016 by ITV Studios for the Nine Network. however on 14 April 2016, the series was shelved due to production issues and Nine implementing changes after a bad start to the ratings year.

== Format ==
The unscripted show follows celebrity chefs competing against each other in hosting a dinner party for the other contestants. Each week over four nights, four celebrities take it in turns to cook up their idea of the perfect evening for the other four. Each believes they can cook up the perfect evening and hopes their unique style will clinch them the title of best host and the $2000 cash prize for charity.

== Episodes ==
=== Xmas Special (2012) ===
| Celeb Hosts | Airdate | Viewers | Rank |
|---|---|---|---|
| Prue MacSween | 11 December 2012 | 63,000 | #4 |
| Josh Thomas | 11 December 2012 | 63,000 | #4 |
| Chloe Maxwell | 11 December 2012 | 63,000 | #4 |
| Kris Smith | 11 December 2012 | 63,000 | #4 |

=== Xmas Special (2013) ===
| Celeb Hosts | Airdate | Viewers | Rank |
|---|---|---|---|
| Steve Price | 1 December 2013 | 97,000 | #2 |
| Simone Callahan | 1 December 2013 | 97,000 | #2 |
| Myf Warhurst | 1 December 2013 | 97,000 | #2 |
| Anthony Koutoufides | 1 December 2013 | 97,000 | #2 |

=== Season 1 (2014) ===
| Ep | Celeb Hosts | Airdate | Viewers | Rank |
|---|---|---|---|---|
| 1 | Charlie Albone | 7 January 2014 | 131,000 | #1 |
| 1 | Kate Waterhouse | 7 January 2014 | 131,000 | #1 |
| 1 | Gretel Killeen | 7 January 2014 | 131,000 | #1 |
| 1 | Peter Morrissey | 7 January 2014 | 131,000 | #1 |
| 2 | Lisa Curry | 14 January 2014 | 150,000 | #1 |
| 2 | Carlotta | 14 January 2014 | 150,000 | #1 |
| 2 | Sam Thaiday | 14 January 2014 | 150,000 | #1 |
| 2 | James Morrison | 14 January 2014 | 150,000 | #1 |
| 3 | Matthew Mitcham | 21 January 2014 | 102,000 | #1 |
| 3 | Maria Venuti | 21 January 2014 | 102,000 | #1 |
| 3 | Sophie Falkiner | 21 January 2014 | 102,000 | #1 |
| 3 | Luke Jacobz | 21 January 2014 | 102,000 | #1 |
| 4 | Red Symons | 28 January 2014 | 98,000 | #1 |
| 4 | Christie Whelan-Browne | 28 January 2014 | 98,000 | #1 |
| 4 | Tiffiny Hall | 28 January 2014 | 98,000 | #1 |
| 4 | Mark Holden | 28 January 2014 | 98,000 | #1 |

== See also ==
- MasterChef
- My Kitchen Rules
- Come Dine with Me Australia
