= Cram (Australian game show) =

- Genre: Game show
- Presented by: Peter Helliar
- Starring: Dilruk Jayasinha; Virginia Gay
- Country of origin: Australia
- Original language: English
- No. of seasons: 1
- No. of episodes: 10

Production
- Producers: Peter Beck; Peter Lawler
- Running time: 60 minutes
- Production company: ITV Studios Australia

Original release
- Network: Network Ten
- Release: 2 November – 14 December 2017

Cram (stylised as CRAM!) was an Australian game show hosted by Peter Helliar, which premiered on Network Ten on 2 November 2017 until 14 December 2017.

The premiere was negatively received by viewers, with ratings dwindling as the season progressed and the show rating outside of the top 20 shows of the day for the season finale.

On 9 November 2017, Channel Ten announced at their yearly upfronts event that the show would return for a second season in 2018, after only one episode of the first season had aired. However, a second season never materialised.

The first season did not secure a spot in the top 100 watched free-to-air shows in 2017.

== Format ==
The format pits two teams of comedians and celebrities tested on their memories across general knowledge categories. Each category will be introduced with a “cram”: a brief video on any subject. The team that recalls the most facts is the winner. The teams are captained by comedian Dilruk Jayasinha and actress Virginia Gay.

== Episodes ==
No.	Team Dilruk	Team Virginia	Winning Team	Original release date	Australian viewers
1	Chris Brown & Nick Cody	Frank Woodley & Miranda Tapsell	Team Dilruk	2 November 2017	569,000
2	Celeste Barber & Rove McManus	Rhys Nicholson & Zoë Coombs Marr	Team Virginia	9 November 2017	381,000
3	Heath Franklin & Natalie Bassingthwaighte	Dave Hughes & Nikki Osborne	Team Dilruk	16 November 2017	410,000
4	Anne Edmonds & Jimeoin	Chrissie Swan & Rhys Nicholson	Team Virginia	23 November 2017	354,000
5	Christie Whelan Browne & Susie Youssef	Grant Denyer & Rowdie Walden	Team Virginia	29 November 2017	290,000
6	Angus O'Loughlin & Josh Thomas	Alex Lee & Chris Brown	Team Dilruk	30 November 2017	285,000
7	Angus O'Loughlin & Josh Thomas	Casey Donovan & Natalie Bassingthwaighte	Team Virginia	6 December 2017	271,000
8	Bridie Connell & Frank Woodley	Ash Williams & Danielle Cormack	Team Virginia	7 December 2017	246,000
9	Chrissie Swan & Nick Cody	Brendan Fevola & Rachel Corbett	Team Virginia	13 December 2017	268,000
10	Heath Franklin & Gen Fricker	Christie Whelan Browne & Rove McManus	Team Dilruk	14 December 2017	<275,000

== Awards and nominations ==
Year	Award	Category	Result
2018	International Format Awards	Best Studio Based Gameshow Format	Nominated
