= Paddock to Plate =

Australian television series

- Genre: Lifestyle
- Presented by: Matt Moran
- Country of origin: Australia
- Original language: English
- No. of series: 2
- No. of episodes: 16

Production
- Production company: ITV Studios Australia

Original release
- Network: LifeStyle
- Release: 6 November 2013 – 22 October 2014

Paddock to Plate is an Australian television series starring Matt Moran. It premiered on LifeStyle on 6 November 2013. A second series was announced in February 2014 and began airing on 3 September.

The series won ASTRA Awards for Most Outstanding Lifestyle Program in 2014 and 2015. It was nominated for Best Light Entertainment Television Series at the 4th AACTA Awards.

== Episodes ==
Series	Episodes	Originally released	
Series	Episodes	First released	Last released
1	8	6 November 2013	16 January 2014
2	8	3 September 2014	22 October 2014

=== Series 1 (2013–14) ===
No.	Title	Original release date	Viewers	Rank (Night)
1	"Piggy Prestige, Yarra Valley"	6 November 2013	100,000	#1
2	"High Country Heaven"	13 November 2013	82,000	#1
3	"Veggie Heaven, Daylesford"	20 November 2013	91,000	#1
4	"Seafood Spectacular, Great Ocean Road"	27 November 2013	107,000	#1
5	"Dairy Delicious, Gippsland"	4 December 2013	104,000	#1
6	"Heart of the Country, Orange"	11 December 2013	107,000	#1
7	"Turkey for Christmas, Tamworth"	18 December 2013	70,000	#3
8	"Byron Bay Summer Special"	16 January 2014	57,000	#8

=== Series 2 (2014) ===
No.	Title	Original release date	Viewers	Rank (Night)
1	"Eyre Peninsula, SA"	3 September 2014	64,000	#9
2	"Riverland, SA"	10 September 2014	57,000	#12
3	"Southern Forests, WA"	17 September 2014	64,000	#4
4	"Fleurieu Peninsula, SA"	24 September 2014	62,000	#4
5	"Gascoyne, WA"	1 October 2014	79,000	#3
6	"Barossa Valley & Adelaide Hill"	8 October 2014	85,000	#1
7	"Perth & Margaret River, WA"	15 October 2014	67,000	#2
8	"The Kimberley"	22 October 2014	68,000	#5
