= Come Dine with Me Australia =

- Country of origin: Australia
- Original language: English
- No. of seasons: 4
- No. of episodes: 80

Production
- Running time: 30 minutes
- Production company: Granada Media Australia

Original release
- Network: The LifeStyle Channel
- Release: 18 January 2010 – 8 February 2013

Related
- Come Dine with Me; Celebrity Come Dine With Me Australia

Come Dine with Me Australia is an Australian reality television series based on the format of the UK show, Come Dine with Me. The show premiered on 18 January 2010 on The LifeStyle Channel. The show is narrated by Aimee Reid and James Valentine.

== Format ==
Each five-episode block of Come Dine with Me Australia follows a new set of five participants, with each episode featuring one of these contestants hosting the other four for dinner. After each dinner, the four guests rate their experience. Each contestants’ points are added after the five-episode block and the overall winner wins a $2000 cash prize.

The structure of the show is consistent across all four seasons. Each episode begins with the introduction of the contestant who is hosting for that episode. Then, the narrator talks through what food the host will be serving. As each course is described, a new participant is shown reading the menu the host has provided. During these breaks where new participants are shown, a small introduction is given for every individual. Once all courses of the meal have been described and all participants have been introduced, the dinner party begins. This either involves introductory interactions between the participants, or an activity provided by the host. After this concludes, the guests begin eating. At this point the show switches between the host cooking and the guests eating/talking. After the entrees are served, the guests begin looking around the hosts' house. This acts as a comedic break from the cooking, as the narrator comments on what is found, and how the guests act. The meal continues from then on, with different episodes taking different forms ranging from activities to games to drama. Once the meal and subsequent activities finish, the guests leave. Each guest is then shown in the back of a car. The guests individually discuss their thoughts about the night and rate their experience out of ten. The episode then ends with the narrator explaining the standings of the participants.

== Production ==
In 2009, The LifeStyle Channel bought the rights to the show, commissioning Granada Australia to produce a version for the Australian market. The first season consists of 20 episodes. A second season was approved before the first season premiered and was broadcast in mid-2010.

== Episodes ==
=== Season 1 (2010) ===
Week	Episode	Night Host	Airdate
One	Episode 1	Julie	18 January 2010
One	Episode 2	Gail	19 January 2010
One	Episode 3	Ben	20 January 2010
One	Episode 4	Jennifer	21 January 2010
One	Episode 5	Richard	22 January 2010
Two	Episode 6	Trudi	25 January 2010
Two	Episode 7	Luke	26 January 2010
Two	Episode 8	Anne-Maree	27 January 2010
Two	Episode 9	Angela	28 January 2010
Two	Episode 10	Alex	29 January 2010
Three	Episode 11	Bryan	1 March 2010
Three	Episode 12	Mel	2 March 2010
Three	Episode 13	Rita	3 March 2010
Three	Episode 14	James	4 March 2010
Three	Episode 15	Nicole	5 March 2010
Four	Episode 16	Tony	8 March 2010
Four	Episode 17	Celeste	9 March 2010
Four	Episode 18	Nicole	10 March 2010
Four	Episode 19	Stephen	11 March 2010
Four	Episode 20	Sheeneagh	12 March 2010

=== Season 2 (2010) ===
Week	Episode	Night Host	Airdate
One	Episode 1	Helen	23 August 2010
One	Episode 2	Ray	24 August 2010
One	Episode 3	Joan	25 August 2010
One	Episode 4	Paula	26 August 2010
One	Episode 5	Taylor	27 August 2010
Two	Episode 6	Jesse	30 August 2010
Two	Episode 7	Sharon	31 August 2010
Two	Episode 8	Kyoko	1 September 2010
Two	Episode 9	David	2 September 2010
Two	Episode 10	Jane	3 September 2010
Three	Episode 11	Dominic	6 September 2010
Three	Episode 12	Michelle	7 September 2010
Three	Episode 13	Yolanda	8 September 2010
Three	Episode 14	Tom	9 September 2010
Three	Episode 15	Deb	10 September 2010
Four	Episode 16	Megan	13 September 2010
Four	Episode 17	David	14 September 2010
Four	Episode 18	Karen	15 September 2010
Four	Episode 19	Kate	16 September 2010
Four	Episode 20	Mark	17 September 2010

=== Season 3 (2011) ===
Week	Episode	Night Host	Airdate
One	Episode 1	Leonie	17 January 2011
One	Episode 2	Lance	18 January 2011
One	Episode 3	Mary	19 January 2011
One	Episode 4	Shane	20 January 2011
One	Episode 5	Ammie	21 January 2011
Two	Episode 6	Cheryl	24 January 2011
Two	Episode 7	Donna	25 January 2011
Two	Episode 8	Tony	26 January 2011
Two	Episode 9	Doreen	27 January 2011
Two	Episode 10	Lachlan	28 January 2011
Three	Episode 11	Vanessa	31 January 2011
Three	Episode 12	Sheila	1 February 2011
Three	Episode 13	Anita	2 February 2011
Three	Episode 14	Lachlan	3 February 2011
Three	Episode 15	Warren	4 February 2011
Four	Episode 16	Suze	7 February 2011
Four	Episode 17	Jacki	8 February 2011
Four	Episode 18	Gerry	9 February 2011
Four	Episode 19	Bromwyn	10 February 2011
Four	Episode 20	Mary-Ann	11 February 2011

=== Season 4 (2013) ===
Week	Episode	Night Host	Airdate
One	Episode 1	Mike	8 January 2013
One	Episode 2	Kiri	9 January 2013
One	Episode 3	Danielle	10 January 2013
One	Episode 4	James	11 January 2013
Two	Episode 5	Derek	15 January 2013
Two	Episode 6	Natalie	16 January 2013
Two	Episode 7	Amaya	17 January 2013
Two	Episode 8	Myles	18 January 2013
Three	Episode 9	Andrew	22 January 2013
Three	Episode 10	Roxanne	23 January 2013
Three	Episode 11	Peter	24 January 2013
Three	Episode 12	Sharon	25 January 2013
Four	Episode 13	Todd	29 January 2013
Four	Episode 14	Eve	30 January 2013
Four	Episode 15	Tom	31 January 2013
Four	Episode 16	Ebony	1 February 2013
Five	Episode 17	Ellen	5 February 2013
Five	Episode 18	Harry	6 February 2013
Five	Episode 19	Alexi	7 February 2013
Five	Episode 20	Sami	8 February 2013

== Celebrity Come Dine With Me Australia ==
A celebrity version of the show was first aired on 11 December 2012 on the Lifestyle Channel. The first episode of Celebrity Come Dine with Me Australia was initially released as a Christmas special in between the release of the third and fourth seasons of Come Dine with Me Australia in December 2012. Another episode of the Celebrity version of the show was released a year later in December 2013 after the conclusion of the fourth and final season of the original show. Then, during January 2014, four episodes of Celebrity Come Dine with Me Australia were broadcast on The Lifestyle Channel.

== International broadcasts ==
In July 2010, the show began broadcasting in the UK under the title Come Dine with Me Down Under before reverting to its original Come Dine with Me Australia title and changing again in the third series.

== See also ==
- List of Australian television series

== See also ==
- MasterChef
- My Kitchen Rules
