= An Aussie Goes Calypso =

- Genre: Reality television
- Starring: Gus Worland
- Narrated by: Hugh Jackman
- Country of origin: Australia
- Original language: English
- No. of seasons: 1

Production
- Executive producers: Hugh Jackman; Matthew Weiss; Deborra-Lee Furness
- Production location: The West Indies
- Cinematography: Chris "Boner" McHattie
- Editor: Pat "Pindawg" Norrish
- Production company: Granada Media Australia

Original release
- Network: FOX8
- Release: 3 December 2008 – 2008

An Aussie Goes Calypso is an Australian reality television series which airs on the pay TV channel FOX8. The series features Australian cricket fan Gus Worland following the Australian cricket team during their 2008 tour of The West Indies. The show is narrated by Hugh Jackman and debuted on 3 December 2008

The series is a sequel to Worland's previous series An Aussie Goes Barmy and An Aussie Goes Bolly.

Episode One: Gus travels to Antigua and is given a tour of the island by his hero, Sir Vivian Richards. Gus challenges Viv to an over of cricket and ends up bowling to the "Master Blaster". Gus is tonked with a lovely hook shot (showing Viv has still "got it." Viv's friend Andrew travels with Gus to the second test at the Viv Richards stadium and the pair witness Simon Katich and Michael Clarke score centuries against a floundering West Indian attack. (Andrew is a cricket tragic, just like K.C "The Fixer" from An Aussie Goes Bolly). Gus tries his hand at goat curry, a local dish and ends up trying pig's tail (another local dish) on the request of a fellow Australian fan. He catches up with Mitchell Johnson and Stuart MacGill on the Antiguan beach. Gus tries his hand at cricket with local kids, and ends up getting bowled, second ball by a local youngster with a Lasith Malinga like slinging action. Gus talks to Stuart McGill about his upcoming retirement.

Episode Two: Gus Worland travels to Barbados with Andrew for the nest test. Gus tries goat curry (again), gets chest pain during the test and experiences the anger of West Indian cricket fans.......
