= Come Dine with Me =

English reality television game show

- Genre: Reality
- Narrated by: Dave Lamb
- Country of origin: United Kingdom
- Original language: English
- No. of series: 23 (Original); 14 (All-in-One); 5 (Couples); 2 (Celebrity); 2 (The Professionals); 1 (Teens)
- No. of episodes: 1,463 (Original); 364 (All-in-One; inc. 8 specials); 250 (Couples); 30 (Celebrity); 40 (The Professionals); 5 (Teens)

Production
- Running time: 30 minutes (Original); 60 minutes (All-in-One)
- Production companies: Granada (2005–09); ITV Studios (2009–13); Multistory Media (2013–)

Original release
- Network: Channel 4
- Release: 10 January 2005 – present

Related
- Come Date with Me

Come Dine with Me is a British reality series that has aired on Channel 4 since 10 January 2005 and is narrated by Dave Lamb.

== Format ==
The original format features four/five amateur chefs who live in the same town or area, who each host a three-course dinner party for the other contestants at their own home over successive episodes. Each competitor then rates the host's food and hosting skills during the taxi journey home, with the highest-scoring chef winning £1,000 cash at the end of the four/five-episode cycle. If more than one competitor receives the highest tied score, the cash is divided between them. The show often features guests with clashing personalities.

Episodes produced for primetime broadcast feature four contestants over a single hour-long episode.

Dave Lamb provides a voiceover, which sometimes includes sarcastic comments on the chefs' food and interior design.

== Transmissions ==
=== Original (Five Contestants) ===
Series	Start date	End date	Episodes
1	10 January 2005	4 February 2005	20
2	12 September 2005	28 October 2005	45
2	10 September 2007	14 September 2007	45
2	15 September 2008	19 September 2008	45
3	24 July 2006	5 January 2007	70
3	3 September 2007	7 September 2007	70
3	25 August 2008	12 September 2008	70
4	19 January 2009	20 February 2009	50
4	1 June 2009	12 June 2009	50
4	31 August 2009	11 September 2009	50
4	25 January 2010	29 January 2010	50
5	12 January 2009	16 January 2009	50
5	25 May 2009	29 May 2009	50
5	15 June 2009	19 June 2009	50
5	24 August 2009	28 August 2009	50
5	14 September 2009	18 September 2009	50
5	11 January 2010	22 January 2010	50
5	1 February 2010	12 February 2010	50
5	27 September 2010	1 October 2010	50
6	30 August 2010	24 September 2010	30
6	11 October 2010	22 October 2010	30
7	4 October 2010	8 October 2010	50
7	25 October 2010	17 December 2010	50
7	7 February 2011	11 February 2011	50
8	17 January 2011	4 February 2011	160
8	14 February 2011	9 December 2011	160
8	26 December 2011	30 December 2011	160
9	12 December 2011	23 December 2011	220
9	16 January 2012	1 March 2013	220
9	24 June 2013	28 June 2013	220
10	4 March 2013	14 June 2013	145
10	30 September 2013	11 April 2014	145
10	21 April 2014	2 May 2014	145
10	12 May 2014	16 May 2014	145
10	13 October 2014	17 October 2014	145
11	14 April 2014	18 April 2014	95
11	5 May 2014	9 May 2014	95
11	19 May 2014	10 October 2014	95
11	20 October 2014	30 January 2015	95
12	21 September 2015	13 November 2015	40
13	16 November 2015	8 September 2017	87 (Note: Commissioned for 90 episodes, three episodes are unaired due to a contestant in the Sheffield episodes.)
14	20 November 2017	8 December 2017	25
14	2 July 2018	13 July 2018	25
15	11 June 2018	29 June 2018	60
15	16 July 2018	14 September 2018	60
16	11 March 2019	23 August 2019	40
17	9 March 2020	10 July 2020	35
17	16 August 2021	20 August 2021	35
18	2 August 2021	13 August 2021	66
18	6 September 2021	29 October 2021	66
18	15 November 2021	19 November 2021	66
18	21 February 2022	25 February 2022	66
18	6 June 2022	24 June 2022	66
18	6 February 2023	10 February 2023	66
18	20 February 2023	24 February 2023	66
19	1 November 2021	12 November 2021	65
19	28 February 2022	4 March 2022	65
19	30 May 2022	3 June 2022	65
19	17 October 2022	4 November 2022	65
19	13 February 2023	17 February 2023	65
19	27 February 2023	25 August 2023	65
20	7 November 2022	18 November 2022	40
20	29 January 2024	8 March 2024	40
21	27 January 2025	21 March 2025	40
22	23 February 2026	27 March 2026	TBC
22	TBD	TBD	TBC
23	30 March 2026	TBD	TBC

=== All-in-One (Four Contestants) ===
Series	Start date	End date	Episodes
1	10 April 2008	18 December 2008	23
1	1 March 2009		23
1	15 March 2009		23
1	12 April 2009		23
1	3 May 2009	10 May 2009	23
2	15 February 2009	22 February 2009	11
2	8 March 2009		11
2	29 March 2009	5 April 2009	11
2	19 April 2009	26 April 2009	11
2	17 May 2009	24 May 2009	11
2	25 April 2010		11
2	26 November 2010		11
3	20 September 2009	29 November 2009	17
3	18 April 2010		17
3	16 May 2010		17
3	13 June 2010		17
3	27 June 2010		17
3	8 October 2010		17
3	5 November 2010		17
4	31 January 2010		16
4	14 March 2010	11 April 2010	16
4	9 May 2010		16
4	23 May 2010		16
4	30 May 2010		16
4	20 June 2010		16
4	4 July 2010		16
4	17 September 2010	15 October 2010	16
4	29 October 2010		16
5	24 May 2010		35
5	15 July 2010		35
5	6 September 2010	14 September 2010	35
5	22 October 2010		35
5	12 November 2010	19 November 2010	35
5	3 December 2010	8 July 2011	35
6	15 July 2011	1 January 2012	32
6	6 January 2012	17 February 2012	32
6	2 March 2012		32
7	2 January 2012		44
7	24 February 2012		44
7	9 March 2012	16 December 2012	44
7	6 January 2013	10 February 2013	44
8	22 February 2013	10 January 2014	40
9	15 September 2014	6 March 2015	25
10	16 March 2015	18 September 2015	25
11	4 January 2016	4 March 2016	30
12	6 August 2016	21 October 2016	16
12	13 May 2017		16
13	3 January 2017	16 February 2017	30
14	11 September 2017	8 January 2018	20

==== Specials ====
Date	Entitle
22 December 2006	Christmas Special
22 December 2009	Celebrity Christmas Special
6 May 2010	Election Special
9 June 2010	WAGs Special
10 June 2010	Footballers Special
29 April 2011	Royal Wedding Special
6 June 2012	Top 30
30 December 2014	Celebrity Christmas Special

=== Couples ===
Series	Start date	End date	Episodes
1	7 July 2014	15 August 2014	30
2	27 April 2015	10 July 2015	50
3	23 November 2015	27 April 2017	110
4	2 January 2019	12 February 2019	30
5	2 January 2020	12 February 2020	30

=== Celebrity ===
Series	Start date	End date	Episodes
1	19 October 2015	23 October 2015	5
2	16 December 2019	23 October 2020	25

=== The Professionals ===
Series	Start date	End date	Episodes
1	27 June 2022	22 July 2022	20
2	6 May 2024	31 May 2024	20

=== Teens ===
Series	Start date	End date	Episodes
1	10 November 2025	14 November 2025	5

== International versions ==
Region/Country	Title	Translated title	Broadcaster	From & to
Algeria (Algerian Arabic)	Un dîner presque parfait El Djazair	An Almost Perfect Dinner "Algeria"	Samira TV	2024
Argentina	Divina Comida	Divine Food	Telefe	2020
Australia	Come Dine with Me Australia		Lifestyle Channel	2010-13
Australia	Celebrity Come Dine With Me Australia		Lifestyle Channel	2012-14
Belgium (Dutch)	Komen Eten	Coming to Eat	VijfTV/ VIER	2009-
Bosnia and Herzegovina	Stol za 4	Table for 4	OBN (TV channel)	2011-
Brazil	Jogo de Panelas	A Game of Pans	TV Globo	2012-
Bulgaria	Черешката на тортата Chereshkata na tortata	The Cherry on the Cake	Nova	2011-
Canada	Come Dine with Me Canada		W	2010-14
Chile	La Divina Comida	A Divine Dinner	Chilevisión	2016–Present
Croatia	Večera za 5	Dinner for 5	RTL	2007–2011; 2023–present
Croatia	Večera za 5 na selu	Dinner for 5 at the Countryside	RTL	2019–2023
Croatia	Riba na torti	Fish on cake	Nova TV	2023–2024
Czech Republic	Prostřeno!	Expand!	Prima TV	2010–present
Denmark	Til middag hos...	To ...’s House for Dinner	TV3	2009-2011; 2015–present
Denmark	4-Stjernes Middag	A 4-Star Dinner	Kanal 5	2010–2012
Estonia	Õhtusöök viiele	Dinner for Five	TV3	2010
Finland	Arvostele mun illallinen Suomessa	Rate My Dinner in Finland	LIV	2011
France	Un Dîner Presque Parfait	An Almost Perfect Dinner	M6	2008-2014
France	Un Dîner Presque Parfait	An Almost Perfect Dinner	W9	2015-present
Germany	Das Perfekte Dinner	The Perfect Dinner	VOX	2006
Greece	Κάτι ψήνεται Kati Psinete	Something's cooking	Alpha TV	2009-2017
Greece	Κάτι ψήνεται Kati Psinete	Something's cooking	ANT1	2019
Greece	Κάτι ξαναψήνεται Kati Ksanapsinete	Something's recooking	Skai TV	2021-2022
Hungary	Vacsoracsata	Food Fight	RTL Klub	2008
India	Welcome – Baazi Mehmaan Nawazi Ki	Welcome – Challenge to be the Best Host	Life OK	2013
Ireland	Come Dine with Me Ireland		TV3	2011-13
Iran	بفرمائید شام; Befarmayid Sham	Come for Dinner	Manoto	2010
Israel (Hebrew)	בואו לאכול איתי; Bo'u Le'ekhol Iti	Come Eat with Me	Channel 1	2012-2014
Israel (Hebrew)	בואו לאכול איתי; Bo'u Le'ekhol Iti	Come Eat with Me	Kan 11	2018-present
Israel (Arabic)	تفصلوا ع العشا; Tfadhalu ‘A L’asha	Come to Dinner	Makan 33	2025-
Italy	A cena da me	Dinner At Mine.	LA7	2016
Kazakhstan	Кім күшті?	Who is stronger?	Channel 31	2018
Latvia	Gandrīz Ideālas Vakariņas	An Almost Ideal Dinner	TV3	2011
Lithuania	Kviečiu Vakarienės	An Invite for Dinner.	BTV	2011
Malaysia	Jom Makan Dengan Saya	Let's Eat with Me	Real Time	2008
Malta	Come Dine With Me Malta		Television Malta	2025
Mexico	Divina Comida México	Divine Food Mexico	HBO Max	2022
Netherlands	Smaken Verschillen	Tastes Differ	Net 5	
Netherlands	Kom je bij me eten? VIPS	Are you coming to dine with me? VIPS	RTL 5 / Videoland	2025
New Zealand	Come Dine with Me New Zealand		Three	2015
Norway	4-stjerners middag	4-Star Meal	TVNorge	2009
Norway	Celebert selskap	Celebrity Company	TV3	2009-2010
Philippines	Come Dine With Me: Celebrity Philippines		HBO Max (Asia)	2026
Poland	Ugotowani	Cooked	TVN	2010–2018
Poland	Ugotowani w parach	Cooked in Pairs	TVN	2023
Quebec (French)	Un Souper Presque Parfait	An Almost Perfect Dinner	Noovo	2010
Romania	Mâncare pe care	Food Battle Royale (Note: The title is a wordplay originating from "mâncare" (food) and the idiom "care pe care" (similar in meaning to "dog eat dog", suggesting fierce competition).)	Acasă	2022
Russia	Званый ужин Zvanyy uzhin	Dinner Party	REN TV	2006-2017
Russia	Идеальный ужин Ideal'nyy uzhin	Perfect Dinner	Che	2018
Serbia	Dođi na večeru	Come to Dinner.	Prva	2010
Serbia	Savršena večera	Perfect Dinner	Nova S	2022
Slovakia	Bez servítky	Without a serviette	Markíza	2009-2015
Slovakia	Bez servítky	Without a serviette	JOJ	2021
South Africa	Come Dine with Me South Africa		BBC Lifestyle	2011-
Spain	Ven a Cenar Conmigo	Come to dine with me.	Antena 3	2008
Spain	Ven a Cenar Conmigo	Come to dine with me.	Cuatro	2017
Sweden	Halv åtta hos mig	Half Past 7 At My Place	TV4	2008
Switzerland	Swiss Dinner	—N/a	TeleZüri	2010
Turkey	Yemekteyiz	We're at meal	Show TV	2008-2011
Turkey	Yemekteyiz	We're at meal	FOX	2012-2014
Turkey	Yemekteyiz	We're at meal	Kanal D	2015
Turkey	Yemekteyiz	We're at meal	TV8	2017-
Ukraine	Звана вечеря Zvana vecheriya	Dinner Party	STB	2007-2008, 2013, 2020-
United Arab Emirates (Arabic)	يلا نتعشى	Come on let's have dinner	Orbit Showtime Network	2020
United States	Dinner Takes All		TLC	2006
United States	Come Dine with Me		Lifetime	2013

== Adaptations ==
=== Come Dine With Me: The Musical ===
A musical adaptation of the show is scheduled to open at the Turbine Theatre in London in September 2024 following a run at the Edinburgh Festival Fringe in July 2024.
