= Keep It Spotless =

- Genre: Competition
- Created by: Simon Crossley
- Directed by: Peter Ney
- Presented by: Melissa van der Schyff
- Country of origin: United States
- Original language: English
- No. of seasons: 1
- No. of episodes: 20

Production
- Executive producers: David Eilenberg; David George; John Cena; Jason R. Carey; Shye Sutherland
- Producer: Tim Beggy
- Running time: 22 minutes
- Production companies: ITV Entertainment; Hard Nocks South Productions; Possessed; ITV Studios Global Entertainment; Nickelodeon Productions

Original release
- Network: Nickelodeon
- Release: March 26 – November 20, 2018

Keep It Spotless is an American competition television program that aired on Nickelodeon from March 26, 2018 to November 20, 2018. The program is presented by Melissa van der Schyff.

== Premise ==
The program features children contestants competing for cash prizes as they aim to keep themselves clean while they navigate and make their way around an obstacle course, which contains various means to splatter the contestants with non-toxic paint in various colors. The contestants must avoid the paint as much as possible and are scored in percentiles, based on how little paint ends up on their all-white clothing (for instance, 30 points are scored if an after-game scan confirms the contestant was 30% 'spotless', or 70% covered with paint upon their clothes).

== Episodes ==
No.	Title	Original release date	Prod. code	U.S. viewers (millions)
1	"Use Your Head"	March 26, 2018	104	1.11
2	"Friends 'til the End"	March 27, 2018	106	1.10
3	"Sibling Rivalry"	March 28, 2018	108	1.13
4	"Why Are You Doing This to Me?"	March 29, 2018	111	1.16
5	"Which Way to the Gym?"	March 30, 2018	109	1.08
6	"I'm Not a Worm"	April 2, 2018	102	1.01
7	"Do the Math"	April 3, 2018	114	1.13
8	"Where's the Party?"	April 4, 2018	113	0.92
9	"Color Me Bad"	April 5, 2018	103	0.85
10	"Slippery When Wet"	April 6, 2018	107	1.04
11	"Block It Out"	November 5, 2018	116	0.92
12	"Twin Cities"	November 6, 2018	110	0.69
13	"Toss Up"	November 7, 2018	105	0.89
14	"The Tortoise vs. the Hare"	November 8, 2018	112	0.81
15	"You're Funny!"	November 13, 2018	117	0.95
16	"Besties vs. Twinsies"	November 14, 2018	101	0.82
17	"Game, Set, Match"	November 15, 2018	119	0.82
18	"Look Out!"	November 19, 2018	115	0.76
19	"Three Hands"	November 20, 2018	118	0.94
20	"Get a Grip"	November 20, 2018	120	0.81

== Production ==
The program is produced by ITV Entertainment and Hard Nocks South Productions and based on a UK format from ITV Studios-owned entertainment label Possessed and created by Simon Crossley titled Spotless. The program also takes inspiration from Nickelodeon classics, including Double Dare and You Can't Do That on Television.

== Ratings ==
Viewership and ratings per season of Keep It Spotless
Season	Episodes	First aired		Last aired		Avg. viewers (millions)
Season	Episodes	Date	Viewers (millions)	Date	Viewers (millions)	Avg. viewers (millions)
1	20	March 26, 2018	1.11	November 20, 2018	0.81	0.95
