= Come Date with Me =

- Genre: Reality Dating game show
- Narrated by: Dave Lamb
- Country of origin: United Kingdom
- Original language: English
- No. of series: 1
- No. of episodes: 5 (inc. 1 special)

Production
- Running time: 30 minutes (inc. adverts)
- Production company: ITV Studios

Original release
- Network: Channel 4
- Release: 5 December 2011 – 10 March 2012

Related
- Come Dine with Me

Come Date with Me is a reality dating show that debuted in the UK as a spin-off of Come Dine with Me. The show is a competitive dining and dating show, featuring one single girl and four eligible bachelors battling to become her dream date. The dates range from flirty dinner parties to a trip to the spa, wine tasting with cheesy one-liners, ice skating or nude life drawing.

== International versions ==
=== Australia ===
An Australian version of the show was set to air on Network Ten in 2012, but was then delayed. It eventually screened on Eleven from 8 December 2013 until 15 January 2014.

=== Canada ===
A Canadian version of the show aired in 2012. It consisted of 10 episodes and aired on W Network. The Cassanovas must cook for their prospective and their fellow Cassanovas.
