= Off Their Rockers (Australian TV series) =

- Genre: Comedy
- Based on: Betty White's Off Their Rockers
- Starring: Sam Kekovich (Host); Alan Faulker; Avril Hilton; Brian Fitzsimmons; Jill Mckay; John Graham; John Keightley; Joy Hruby; Julie Herbert; Kerry Graham; Lynne Porteous; Rosslyn Powell; Sky Tse
- Country of origin: Australia
- Original language: English
- No. of seasons: 1
- No. of episodes: 8

Production
- Running time: 30 minutes
- Production company: Granada Australia

Original release
- Network: The Comedy Channel
- Release: 13 January – 3 March 2013

Off Their Rockers is an Australian comedy television series produced by Granada Media Australia that aired on The Comedy Channel from 13 January 2013 until 3 March 2013. The series, hosted by Sam Kekovich and filmed in Sydney, ran for eight episodes, It is based on the U.S. version titled Betty White's Off Their Rockers. The original format however is from a Belgian television show 'Benidorm Bastards', broadcast by 2BE. The premise of the show involves senior citizens playing pranks on unsuspecting young members of the public. The title music used in the international versions is still the original score written by Tim Van Aelst.
