= My Mum, Your Dad =

British television series

- Genre: Reality
- Created by: Greg Daniels; Haley Daniels
- Based on: My Mom, Your Dad by: Greg Daniels; Haley Daniels
- Presented by: Davina McCall
- Country of origin: United Kingdom
- Original language: English
- No. of series: 2
- No. of episodes: 20

Production
- Running time: ca. 45 minutes (excl. adverts)
- Production company: Lifted Entertainment

Original release
- Network: ITV1 and ITVX
- Release: 11 September 2023 – 27 September 2024

My Mum, Your Dad is a dating show for single parents hosted by Davina McCall and broadcast on ITV1 and ITVX.

== Format ==
My Mum, Your Dad is a dating show that follows a group of single parents endeavours to find love. Each parent has been nominated by an adult son or daughter, each of whom drops their parent off at a country house retreat before converging on a nearby surveillance room or 'Bunker' to witness each mum and dad's bids for love. Each son or daughter plays matchmaker and should their parent find a romantic connection they decide whether to give their seal of approval.

== Production ==
In January 2023, it was reported that ITV were set to commission a new dating series that was teased as a version of "Love Island for "mid-life single parents". The series was given the working title The Romance Retreat and Davina McCall was announced to be presenting the series in March 2023. Following the announcement of her appointment as presenter, McCall said she had "manifested" the show into existence and had "begged [television] bosses" to give her the role of presenter, adding that she made it happen and "willed there to be an amazing new dating programme for grown-ups." She described the cast as "people who have lived a life, been through experiences [...] They've got luggage but they deserve love."

In June 2023, the series was confirmed to be titled My Mum, Your Dad. The series format was created by father and daughter Greg and Haley Daniels and a version of the show originally aired in the United States on HBO Max in January 2022, with France and Germany also producing their own versions. The British version of the show is produced by Lifted Entertainment. Paul Mortimer, director of Reality and Acquisitions, said of the show's commissioning: "My Mum, Your Dad" is set to be a relationship show with a difference, as [they] follow the emotional and inspiring journeys of single parents looking to find love once more." The first trailer for the series aired on 31 July 2023 during the finale of the tenth series of Love Island. The series was shelved by ITV in January 2025, but could potentially return in the future.

=== Location ===
The retreat is Viola House in the West Sussex village of Stedham. It is set on 45-acres within the South Downs National Park and has a reception hall and 5 reception rooms, a kitchen and secondary kitchen, a utility room, a cellar, a leisure complex that houses an indoor swimming pool, a master suite with a dressing room and bathroom, 8 further bedrooms with 6 further bath or shower rooms—2 of which are en-suite, garaging, workshop and equestrian facilities, and a tennis court.

=== Music ===
A popular element of My Mum, Your Dad is the music played within it.

Series 1 tracks, included: "Every Little Thing She Does Is Magic" by The Police, "Higher Love" by Steve Winwood, "Hot Stuff" by Donna Summer, "How Will I Know" by Whitney Houston, "Keep On Loving You" by REO Speedwagon, and "You Make My Dreams" by Hall & Oates.

Series 2 tunes, included: "A Good Heart" by Feargal Sharkey, "Here I Go Again" by Whitesnake, "I Drove All Night" by Cyndi Lauper, "Invisible Touch" by Genesis, "The Whole of the Moon" by The Waterboys, and "You're the Voice" by John Farnham.

== Series overview ==
Series	Episodes	First broadcast on ITV1	
Series	Episodes	First aired	Last aired
1	10	11 September 2023	22 September 2023
2	10	16 September 2024	27 September 2024

== Series 1 (2023) ==
The line-up of parents and their children appearing in the series were announced on 4 September 2023, a week before the show's launch.

Parent	Age	Hometown	Son/Daughter	Age
Tolullah Aiyela	50	London	Georgia-Blu Begg	28
Sharon Benson	53	Sunderland	Tia Zanetti	24
Clayton Byfield	57	Nottingham	Christian Byfield	35
Elliott Davidson	53	Essex	Zachary Davidson	21
Paul Edwards	47	Bath	Mazey Edwards	21
Roger Hawes	58	Derbyshire	Jess Hawes-Brown	28
Martin Henlan	56	Epsom	Jessica Henlan	23
Martin Makepeace	53	Derby	Luke Makepeace	18
Caroline McGirr	51	South Lanarkshire	Karli MacCallum	20
Monique Payneeandy	50	London	Taiya Payneeandy	21
Natalie Russell	43	Bournemouth	Kaliel Russell	20
Janey Smith	47	West Sussex	William Lancaster	19

=== Weekly summary ===
The main events in the My Mum, Your Dad retreat are summarised in the table below.

Weekly summary
Week 1	Entrances	On Day 1, Caroline, Elliott, Clayton, Monique, Natalie, Paul, Roger and Sharon entered the retreat, whilst their children Christian, Jess, Kaliel, Karli, Mazey, Taiya, Tia and Zachary entered the bunker.; On Day 2, Janey entered the retreat, whilst her son William entered the bunker.; On Day 3, Martin H entered the retreat, whilst his daughter Jessica entered the bunker.; On Day 4, Martin M and Tolullah entered the retreat, whilst their children Luke and Georgia-Blu entered the bunker.
Week 1	Challenges	On Day 3, the parents took part in a self-acceptance workshop.; On Day 3, the parents took part in a "confession session" game.
Week 1	Dates	On Day 1, the women were told they would be able to choose one of the men to take on a date. Monique chose Paul, Sharon selected Elliott, Natalie went with Clayton and Caroline went on a date with Roger.; On Day 2, the children were told they would have to decide which two parents to send on a paddleboard yoga date. They chose Natalie and Paul.; On Day 4, Sharon and Elliott went on a date to play tennis.; On Day 4, the children were told they would be pairing up the parents to send on dates. They put Martin M and Monique together, Clayton and Janey as a pair and matched up Roger and Caroline.; On Day 5, new arrivals Martin M and Tolullah went on speed dates with the other parents.
Week 2	Challenges	On Day 6, the parents took part in an intimacy workshop.; On Day 8, the children were told that the parents would be taking part in a workshop to reflect on their time in the retreat, and they would be able to communicate with them using only one word.
Week 2	Dates	On Day 7, the children were told they have to choose two parents to go on a dinner date, where the waitress would ask them questions posed by the children. They chose Martin H and Tolullah.; On Day 9, the final couples went on dates. Natalie and Paul set sail on a yacht, Janey and Roger went on a helicopter ride and had a picnic, Sharon and Elliott went wine tasting, whilst Martin M and Monique went for afternoon tea on the orient express.
Week 2	Exits	On Day 7, the children were told they would have to collectively decide which two parents would leave the retreat. They chose Caroline and Clayton.; On Day 9, Martin H and Tolullah decided to leave the retreat as they did not have any romantic connections with anyone.; On Day 10, the children were told they would reunite with their parents and decide whether or not to give them their blessing. William and Jess gave parents Roger and Janey their blessing, as did Kaliel and Mazey to their parents Natalie and Paul. Tia and Zachary supported their parents Sharon and Elliott. Prior to Taiya and Luke's decision, Monique decided that she and Martin M were not compatible.

== Series 2 (2024) ==
The line-up of parents and their children appearing in the second series were announced in August 2024. The series began on 16 September 2024. In a change for this series, the parents were aware that they were being watched by their children. It featured the return of Paul Edwards from the first series.

Parent	Age	Hometown	Son/Daughter	Age
Vicky Davies	50	South Wales	Angharad Davies	28
Paul Edwards	48	Bath	Mazey Edwards	22
Jenny Francis	51	Cheshire	Malachi Al-Radhi	19
Christian Hoyle	46	Kendal	Lucas Hoyle	17
Chris Leahy	47	Hull	Ava Leahy	17
Maria Lopiano	51	Surrey	Livia Torchia	19
David McLeod	53	Bristol	Tiana McLeod	21
Steph Morgan	44	London	Mia Thorpe	21
Andy Pearce	50	Staffordshire	Issy Pearce	19
Clare Sullivan	53	West Sussex	Aimee Sullivan	26
Danny Wright	49	Sussex	Ellis Wright	21

=== Weekly summary ===
The main events in the My Mum, Your Dad retreat are summarised in the table below.

Weekly summary
Week 1	Entrances	On Day 1, Andy, Christian, Clare, Danny, David, Jenny, Maria and Vicky entered the retreat, whilst their children Aimee, Angharad, Ellis, Issy, Livia, Lucas, Malachi and Tiana entered the bunker.; On Day 2, Chris entered the retreat, whilst his daughter Ava entered the bunker.; On Day 4, Steph and Paul entered the retreat, whilst their daughters Mia and Mazey entered the bunker.
Week 1	Challenges	On Day 2, the children were told they would watch their parents cook a meal that evening, and were asked to choose two parents for to be head chefs; they chose Vicky and Christian, and another two sets of parents to be sous chefs; they chose Jenny and Chris, and Maria and David.; On Day 3, the parents took part in a self-acceptance workshop.
Week 1	Dates	On Day 1, the children were told they would be able to choose who their parents would go on their first dates with. They decided on David and Jenny, Andy and Maria, Christian and Clare, and Danny and Vicky.; On Day 2, each of the mums went on a speed date with new arrival Chris.; On Day 3, the children were told they would have to decide which two parents to send on a pottery making date. They chose Clare and Danny.; On Day 4, the children were told they would have to decide which two parents to send on a dance lesson date. They chose David and Vicky.; On Day 4, following Steph's entrance, her daughter Mia had to decide which of the dads would go on a date with her mum. She chose Danny.; On Day 5, the children were told they had to choose three of the parents, who would then decide who they wanted to go on a date with. They chose Andy, Christian and Jenny, who ultimately chose to go on dates with Steph, Maria and Danny respectively.
Week 2	Challenges	On Day 6, the parents took part in a question answering session in the garden in which one parent would choose a question and get another parent to answer it.; On Day 7, the parents took part in an intimacy workshop.; On Day 8, the dads took part in men only a workshop with a life and relationships coach, whilst the mums spoke about their experience in the with Davina.; On Day 9, the children were told that they would have to write a sentence for their parent to read out during the final workshop with a psychotherapist, detailing what they thought their parent needed to leave behind upon leaving the retreat.
Week 2	Dates	On Day 6, the children were told they would have to choose two parents to go on a seaside date together. They chose Paul and Steph. Their children Mazey and Mia also had the opportunity to give their parent a "pep talk" during the date.; On Day 6, the children were told they could choose one parent to gain access to a secret room in the retreat called "The Snug", in which they could have some alone time with another parent. The children chose Danny, who ultimately took Jenny with him. Unbeknownst to the children, their parents had the opportunity to switch off the feed in the bunker whilst in "The Snug".; On Day 7, the children were told they would have to choose two parents to go on a chocolate making date together. They chose Christian and Steph. Their children Lucas and Mia each had the opportunity to give their parents a "pep talk" before and during the date respectively.; On Day 10, the parents went on their final dates. Danny and Jenny took a ride in a classic car and watched a montage of their journey in the retreat, David and Vicky went in a hot air balloon before having a picnic, whilst Paul and Steph had an outdoor dinner date at a pub.
Week 2	Exits	On Day 9, Davina asked the parents whether they would like to continue exploring a connection, or whether they would exit the retreat. Danny and Jenny, David and Vicky and Paul and Steph chose to continue, whilst Andy, Chris, Christian, Clare and Maria left the retreat and were reunited with their children.; On Day 10, following Paul and Steph's decision to remain friends, they were reunited with their daughters Mazey and Mia. The other children were told they would reunite with their parents and decide whether or not to give them their blessing. Ellis and Malachi gave parents Danny and Jenny their blessing, as did Mazey and Angharad to their parents David and Vicky.

== Reception ==
Professional ratings
Review scores
Source	Rating
The Daily Telegraph	4/5 stars
The Independent	3/5 stars
The Guardian	4/5 stars
The Times	2/5 stars

Anita Singh of The Daily Telegraph described the show's contestants as "attractive" and "well-turned out" and noted that presenter Davina McCall [brought] "exactly the right level of warmth and enthusiasm". Fiona Sturges of The Independent noted that the show's producers appeared to have "mistaken the middle-aged contestants for helpless geriatrics who can no longer be trusted to boil a kettle, let alone make decisions about who they’d like to date".

The series was described by Lucy Mangan of The Guardian as "hilarious" and "excruciating". She added that "unlike the usual contestants [on Love Island] these people have real stories, real baggage and [...] real emotions. Carol Midgley of The Times criticised the series, noting that she'd "sooner eat [her] own liver than have [her] children spying on [her] pitiful attempts at flirting or snogging", noting that there was too much focus on the children's opinions. She did however comment that the "saving grace" was the contestants and their "endearing vulnerability" which gave [the show] a heart that Love Island lacks.

== International versions ==
Country	Title	Premiere year	Network	Host	Source
Australia	My Mom, Your Dad	2023	Nine Network	Kate Langbroek	
Belgium (French)	Ma Mère, Ton Père	2025	RTL-TVI	Sandrine Dans	
Brazil	Minha Mãe com Seu Pai	2025	Multishow and Globoplay	Sabrina Sato	
Canada (French)	Ma Mère, Ton Père	2024	TVA	Nathalie Simard	
France	Ma mère, ton père, l'amour et moi	2023	TF1	Hélène Mannarino	
Germany	My Mom, Your Dad	2023	Vox	Amira Pocher	
New Zealand	My Mum, Your Dad	2024	Three	Sharyn Casey	
Poland	Moja mama i twój tata	2024	Polsat	Katarzyna Cichopek	
Sweden	Min mamma, din pappa	2023	TV4	Linda Lindorff	
United Kingdom	My Mum, Your Dad	2023	ITV1	Davina McCall	
United States [original]	My Mom, Your Dad	2022	HBO Max	Yvonne Orji	
