= An Aussie Goes Barmy =

- Genre: Reality television
- Starring: Gus Worland
- Narrated by: Hugh Jackman
- Country of origin: Australia
- Original language: English
- No. of seasons: 1
- No. of episodes: 5

Production
- Executive producers: Hugh Jackman; Matthew Weiss; Deborra-Lee Furness
- Production location: Australia
- Production company: Granada Media Australia

Original release
- Network: FOX8
- Release: 29 November – 27 December 2006

An Aussie Goes Barmy is an Australian reality television series which aired on the pay TV channel FOX8 in 2006. The series featured Australian cricket fan Gus Worland infiltrating the Barmy Army, an organised group of supporters of the England cricket team.

The series was narrated by Hollywood actor Hugh Jackman, who had been "best mates" with Worland since they attended the same kindergarten in Australia. The production company owned by Jackman and his wife Deborra-Lee Furness, Seed Productions, devised and produced the series with Granada Productions and Foxtel. The premise of the series was that Worland, who had lived in England for twenty years and had an English wife, must follow the Barmy Army as they travel from the UK to Australia for the 2006–07 Ashes series. Jackman makes a bet with his friend—if England wins the Test series, Worland must join the Barmy Army permanently and become an England supporter (Australia won the series 5–0).

An Aussie Goes Barmy was followed by a sequel, An Aussie Goes Bolly, in 2007, which featured Worland travelling through India during a tour by the Australian cricket team.
