= An Aussie Goes Bolly =

- Genre: Reality television
- Starring: Gus Worland
- Narrated by: Hugh Jackman
- Country of origin: Australia
- Original language: English
- No. of seasons: 1
- No. of episodes: 6

Production
- Executive producers: Hugh Jackman; Matthew Weiss; Deborra-Lee Furness
- Production location: India
- Production company: Granada Media Australia

Original release
- Network: FOX8
- Release: 6 January – 10 February 2008

An Aussie Goes Bolly is an Australian reality television series which aired on the pay TV channel FOX8 in 2008. The six-part series featured Australian cricket fan Gus Worland following the Australian cricket team during their 2007 tour of India.

The series was a sequel to Worland's 2006 series An Aussie Goes Barmy, and was narrated and produced by Hollywood actor Hugh Jackman, who had been "best mates" with Worland since they attended the same kindergarten in Australia.

During a match in Mumbai, Worland stood up to 47,000 Indian fans who were making racial taunts against Australian player Andrew Symonds.

The series won the Astra Award for best Sports Program on Australian Pay Television
