= Paul & Rach =

- Genre: Comedy (drive time)
- Running time: 180 minutes
- Country of origin: Australia
- Language(s): English
- Home station: Triple M Sydney
- Hosted by: Paul Murray; Rachel Corbett
- Created by: Paul Murray
- Audio format: Stereo
- Website: Official Site
- Podcast: Paul & Rach

Paul & Rach was an afternoon drive time radio program that broadcasts on Triple M Sydney. It commenced broadcasting in that timeslot on 8 September 2009. Previously they were in the breakfast timeslot from June to late August previously hosted by Ugly Phil and Sami Lukis and then replaced by the Grill Team.

Originally, the show started in January 2009 as a night show.

The hosts were Paul Murray and Rachel Corbett.

The Paul & Rach show ended on 3 December 2010, though Rachel Corbett remains with Triple M and will be heard on the Grill Team as newsreader.

== Format ==
The show has taken elements from their previous breakfast show and the Paul Murray Show.

== Segments ==
- "Count the Coin" – The sound of a coin being dropped on a table is played and callers have to guess what type of coin it is and they win the coin as the prize.
- "Your Pick At 6" – A segment where listeners submit a song suggestion via the website that has meaning and means the world to them and if selected will be played at 6 pm.
