= Hot30 Countdown =

Australian radio show

- Other names: The Summer30
- Genre: Music, talk
- Running time: 150 minutes (7:30 pm – 10:00 pm)
- Country of origin: Australia
- Language: English
- Home station: 2Day FM
- Syndicates: Today Network; (including Hot FM; Sea FM; Star FM); Ace Radio
- Hosted by: Michael 'MC' Christian; Mel Greig
- Original release: 1996 – 7 December 2012
- Audio format: Stereophonic sound
- Website: Hot30 Countdown

The Hot30 Countdown was an Australian radio show hosted by Mike Christian (MC) and Mel Greig. It was broadcast on the Today Network from the studios of 2Day FM in Sydney, New South Wales to every state and the Australian Capital Territory following The Dirt. It was cancelled on 10 December 2012, following the suicide of Jacintha Saldanha, and was replaced by The Bump.

== History ==
In 1993–94, Phil O'Neil (aka Ugly Phil) hosted a nightly program with his then-wife, Jackie O (aka Jackie Last), on Triple M Adelaide called Phil O'Neil's Hot 30. Later, Fox FM brought the show to Melbourne, renaming it the Hot30 Countdown. When the Austereo network decided to syndicate the show nationally, Phil and Jackie O moved to Sydney in 1996. The couple split in 1999, and Phil left the show mid-2000. Jason Sole ("Soleman") filled in for a few weeks until the next host was found. Brisbane-based announcer, Kyle Sandilands, was then moved in to host with Jackie O from mid-2000 until the end of 2003.

Labrat and Alexis took over the Hot30 Countdown from 2004 after Sandilands and Jackie O moved to the drive-time slot. A previously unknown announcer "Higgo" stepped in after Labrat took the morning shift on 2Day FM. Alexis and Higgo hosted the nightly show until 2005, when Craig Low came in to host the program until mid-2006. Low occasionally included Carla Bignasca as co-host who was the executive producer of the show from the middle of 2006.

Hot30 Countdown phased out the national promotion of the Black Thunders in early 2005, across the Today Network. Sam Mac and Bignasca hosted the show from late 2006 until early 2007. From early 2007 Tim Lee was announced as the permanent replacement to host the show with Bignasca. In February 2010, it was announced that Lee and Bignasca would be leaving the Hot30 Countdown, with Lee relocating to Fox FM in Melbourne, presenting Mornings; while Bignasca expected to focus on television opportunities. Lee and Bignasca presented their last show on 12 March 2010.

Austereo announced on 10 March 2010 that Charli Robinson and Chris Page would be the new hosts. They commenced on 15 March, subsequently introducing a new show at 7pm, The Dirt. Page left the Hot30 Countdown at the end of 2010, moving to Triple M's Grill Team in Sydney and Delaney became the first solo host of The Dirt nationally.

In February 2011, Austereo announced that Matty Acton and Maude Garrett would be the new hosts. From 5 September 2011, it was announced by Southern Cross Austereo, the Hot30 Countdown would broadcast into syndicated channels as well as additional Today Network regional channels and with the merger it changed their Australian studio line to 13 10 60. Acton and Garrett also hosted a weekend music show on Southern Cross Ten which was launched as Hot30 Countdown TV, airing Saturdays from 10 am to 12 noon and Sundays at 9 am to 12 noon.

On 31 January 2012 Garrett revealed on the show that she was leaving on 10 February and it was announced on Friday 9 March that Mel Greig (of Amazing Race Australia) would be the replacement co-host. In November Acton announced that he was leaving the show to work at Sea FM on the Gold Coast, Queensland with Fox FM morning presenter, Mike Christian (MC) replacing Acton in early December.

Timeline of hosts

No	Presenter(s)	From	To	Duration
1	Ugly Phil O'Neil and Jackie O	1996	2000	3 years
2	Kyle Sandilands and Jackie O	2000	2003	3 years
3	Jason 'LabRat' Hawkins and Alexis Savaidis	12 January 2004	4 August 2004	205 days
4	Dave 'Higgo' Higgins and Alexis Savaidis	5 August 2004	28 January 2005	176 days
5	Craig 'Lowie' Low	31 January 2005	10 November 2006	1 year, 283 days
6	Tim Lee and Carla 'Biggzy' Bignasca	15 January 2007	12 March 2010	3 years, 56 days
7	Charli Delaney and Chris 'Pagey' Page	15 March 2010	11 February 2011	333 days
8	Matty Acton and Maude Garrett	14 February 2011	10 February 2012	361 days
9	Matty Acton and Mel Greig	19 March 2012	30 November 2012	256 days
10	Michael 'MC' Christian and Mel Greig	3 December 2012	7 December 2012	4 days

Sam Mac covered the period between Craig Low's departure in November 2006 and Tim Lee's arrival in January 2007. Sophie Monk was among a series of stand-in presenters who covered the period between the departure of Maude Garrett in February 2012 and the arrival of Mel Greig in March 2012.

=== Duchess of Cambridge prank call and cancellation ===
On 6 December 2012, the day after the then pregnant Catherine, Duchess of Cambridge, was admitted to King Edward VII's Hospital for a severe case of morning sickness, Mel Greig and Michael Christian rang the hospital pretending to be Queen Elizabeth II and Prince Charles. The prank worked, with a nurse, Jacintha Saldanha, forwarding the call on to Catherine's private nurse, and Greig and Christian were able to obtain Catherine's medical details. The prank was condemned by a journalist writing in The Huffington Post, and the hospital announced they deeply regretted the incident and would be "reviewing [their] telephone protocols."

Following the incident Saldanha was found dead in a suspected suicide. Following her death both Greig and Christian, took down their Twitter accounts. An executive producer for 2Day FM, told TMZ, "I advise you to stop trying to call them" as the hosts have been "ordered" not to speak to media. It was later announced that Greig and Christian would be stepping away from their duties. The company that owned the station released a statement reported by TMZ, which stated, "SCA and 2Day FM are deeply saddened by the tragic news of the death of nurse Jacintha Saldanha from King Edward VII's Hospital. [...] SCA and the hosts have decided that they will not return to their radio show until further notice out of respect for what can only be described as a tragedy."

At a Federal Court of Australia hearing, it became known that Australian media watchdog Australian Communications & Media Authority (ACMA) had prepared a confidential, preliminary report saying that the Radio Royal hoax 'broke law'. 2Day FM acted illegally by airing the phone call without consent. On 10 December 2012, Southern Cross Austereo, announced that the show would be cancelled effective immediately. On the following day both Christian and Greig were interviewed on TV shows and apologised for their part in the incident.

== Hot30 Jelli ==
In November 2009, a Digital Radio offshoot, Hot30 Jelli, was launched. A joint venture with Jelli, the station uses a play list from current and previous Hot30 Countdown music, which is then voted on by listeners at the Hot30 Jelli website. The station has since been renamed Choose The Hits.
