= Shock jock =

Type of radio broadcaster

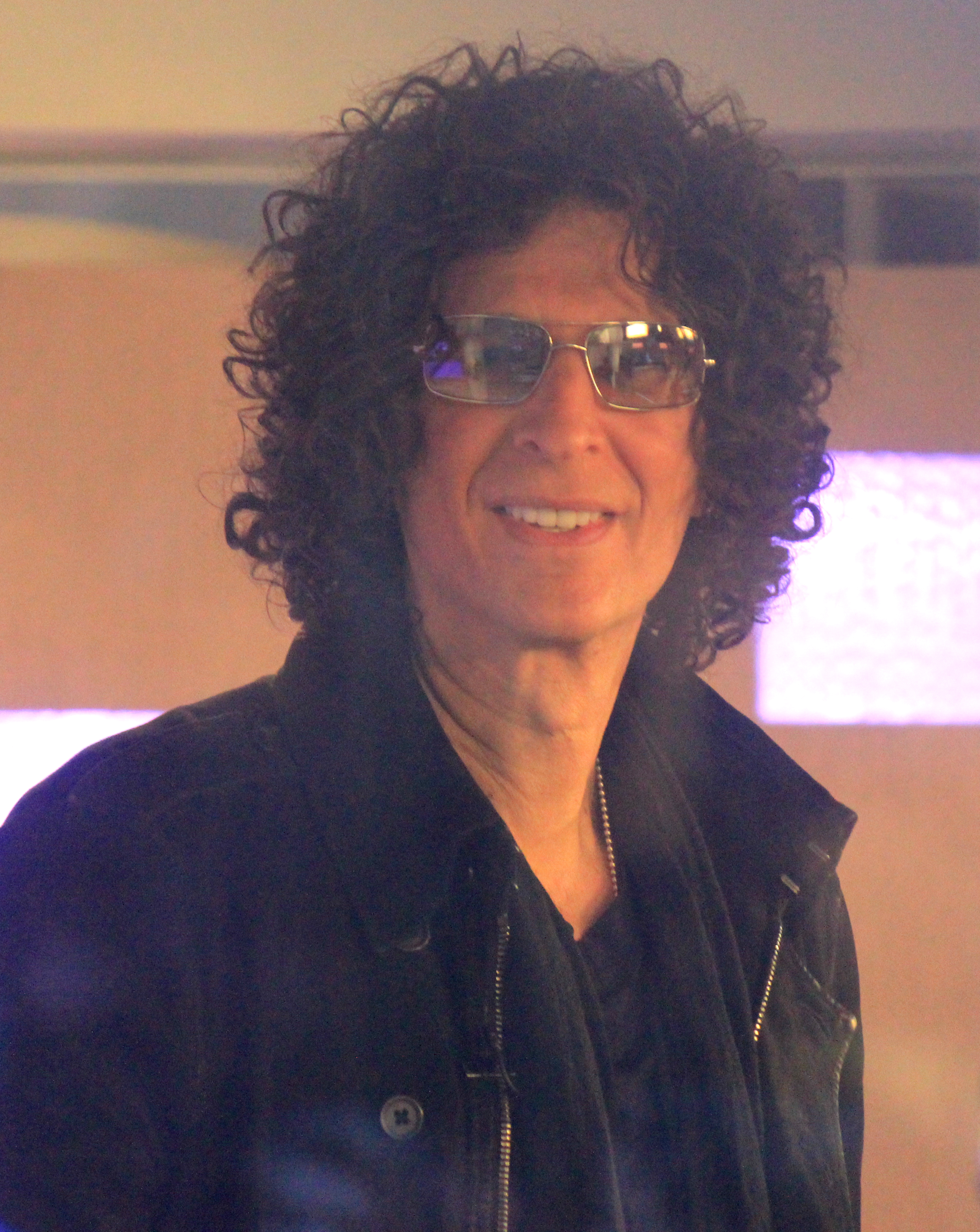
Howard Stern, whose radio shows popularized the term "shock jock"

A shock jock is a radio broadcaster or DJ who entertains listeners and attracts attention using humor or melodramatic exaggeration that may offend some portion of the listening audience. The term is used pejoratively to describe provocative or irreverent broadcasters whose mannerisms, statements and actions are typically offensive to much of society. It is a popular term within the radio industry. A shock jock is the radio equivalent of the tabloid newspaper in that both consider entertaining their audience to be as important as—if not more important than—providing factual information. A radio station that relies primarily on shock jocks for programming has what is called a hot talk format.

The term is used in two broad, yet sometimes overlapping, contexts:

1. The radio announcer who deliberately makes outrageous, controversial, or shocking statements, or does boundary-pushing stunts to improve ratings.
2. The political radio announcer who has an emotional outburst in response to a controversial government policy decision.

== Background ==
The idea of an entertainer who breaks taboos or who is deliberately offensive is not a new one: Blue comedians have existed throughout history; take, for example, offensive performers such as George Carlin, Petronius, Benny Bell, Le Pétomane, Redd Foxx and Lenny Bruce. Petey Greene, who started broadcasting in 1966, has been called the original radio shock jock by some, although the term was not used until 1986, two years after Greene's death. Greene was an influence on Howard Stern, whose radio shows in the 1980s led to the first widespread use of the term "shock jock".

Shock jocks also tend to push the envelope of decency in their market, and they may appear to show a lack of regard for communications regulations (e.g., FCC rules in the U.S.) regarding content. However, nearly all American broadcasters have strict policies against content that is likely to draw indecency forfeitures, and air personalities are often contractually obligated to avoid broadcasting such content.

Many shock jocks have been fired as a result of such punishments as regulatory fines, loss of advertisers, or simply social and political outrage. On the other hand, it is also not uncommon for such broadcasters to be quickly rehired by another station or network. Shock jocks in the United States have been censored under additional pressure from the United States government since the introduction of the Broadcast Decency Enforcement Act of 2005, which increased the fines on radio stations for violating decency guidelines by nearly 20 times.

== Notable examples ==
=== North America ===
- 1990: Liz Randolph, a personality at WBZZ in Pittsburgh, successfully sued the station and its two morning hosts, Jim Quinn and Banana Don Jefferson, for a running gag sexually harassing her. Quinn remained in his position but over the next several years would gradually transition to a politically oriented format for his show.
- 1991: Rusty Humphries, then at KEGL, orchestrates a stunt attempting to sneak toy weapons onto a plane at Dallas/Fort Worth International Airport.
- 1994: Mancow Muller of KYLD-FM orchestrates a stunt blocking off the westbound lanes of the San Francisco–Oakland Bay Bridge during rush hour while his on-air sidekick got a haircut, in response to (false) allegations then-President Bill Clinton would have caused delays at Los Angeles International Airport by getting his hair cut aboard Air Force One. Muller and the radio station both got sued.
- 1995: Howard Stern responds to the death of singer Selena with a comment on how "Alvin and the Chipmunks have more soul" than Latin musicians and that "Spanish people have the worst taste in music." Stern survived the resultant outrage from the Hispanic community, which extended so far as an arrest warrant from Harlingen, Texas, that the local justice of the peace left open for a year but, because Stern never entered Harlingen, went unenforced.
- 1998: Stern is banned from CHOM-FM in Montreal after remarking that "there's something about the (French) language that turns you into a pussy-assed jack-off." His only other Canadian affiliate, CILQ Toronto, sustained a barrage of complaints for three years afterward before dropping the show in 2001.
- February 24, 1999: Doug Tracht aka The Greaseman was fired from WARW (now WIAD) after he played a song by Grammy Award-winning rapper Lauryn Hill and made a derogatory remark about the lynching and dragging death of James Byrd Jr. at the hands of three white men in Jasper, Texas, which was ruled a hate crime. A day earlier, the ringleader John William King was found guilty of Byrd's murder. King and his accomplice Lawrence Brewer have since been executed. The third man Shawn Berry is currently serving his life sentence at the Texas Department of Criminal Justice's Ramsey Unit. It wasn't the first time Tracht made insensitive remarks towards African Americans. On Martin Luther King Day in 1986 while working at DC101, Tracht made the following remark about Dr. King's assassination, "Kill four more and we can take a whole week off."
- June 12, 2001: A rumor that Britney Spears was dead was scotched by her publicists after the story was spread by two US radio DJs and a hoax website using the BBC logo. Dallas shock jocks Kramer and Twitch told listeners to their KEGL-FM evening show that pop singer Spears and her then-boyfriend Justin Timberlake had been involved in a car accident in Los Angeles. The hoax sparked panic among fans, who called police and fire departments in the hundreds. The story was then turned into a spoof version of a BBC News Online web page, and the link was sent around the world by e-mail. The BBC lodged a strong protest, and the spoof page was removed.
- August 16, 2002: Opie and Anthony sponsored a contest where the goal was to have sex in notable public places, called Sex For Sam. The contest went without a major outcry until Sex for Sam 3 after a couple had sex in a vestibule at St. Patrick's Cathedral. The resulting controversy, coupled with an earlier controversy stemming from a raunchy party in Buffalo, New York, led to Infinity Broadcasting cancelling the Opie and Anthony Show. Infinity was fined US$357,500 for the incident.
- 2003: Tom Leykis outs the name of the accuser in the Kobe Bryant sexual assault case. The woman's name had been redacted from all other media reports about the case to date.
- January 2004: Bubba the Love Sponge receives a $755,000 fine from the FCC for a series of sketches that implied cartoon characters were having sex.
- April 8, 2004: Howard Stern's show was dropped by Clear Channel Communications after they were fined US$495,000 for a number of statements made during a Stern show. Stern later used his remaining market share to criticize Clear Channel and the Bush administration, and left the public airwaves to move to satellite radio, which is not subject to the same FCC decency regulations.
- May 12, 2004: Portland Modern Rock station KNRK's morning show The Marconi Show played an audio clip from the beheading of Nick Berg on repeat, adding their snide commentary to it. After the station was flooded with angry phone calls and emails from listeners, KNRK General Manager Mark Hamilton apologised and fired both hosts of the show and their producer, asking listeners to call or write in with their suggestions on how to shape the station for the future. The result was the elimination of shock jocks and most of the hard rock music that made up the station's playlist at the time.
- December 2004: The Federal Communications Commission proposed fines totaling $220,000 against Entercom Communications for alleged indecency violations during multiple broadcasts in April and May 2002 of the Johnny Dare Morning Show on KQRC-FM in Kansas City, Kansas. The FCC claimed that the material included repeated graphic and explicit sexual descriptions that were pandering, titillating or used to shock the audience. As justification for proposing the maximum fine, the Commission noted "the egregious nature of the violations and Entercom's history of prior indecent broadcasts."
- 2006: J. R. Gach described, on-air, an employee at a restaurant he was patronizing who had suffered serious burns, which later escalated into a series of insults. The subject of Gach's discussion sued him over the comments, citing severe emotional distress and won a US$1,000,000 settlement in December 2007. The lawsuit effectively ended Gach's career; he never again hosted a radio show before his 2015 death.
- April 2007: Don Imus is fired for referring to members of the Rutgers Scarlet Knights women's basketball team as "nappy-headed hos." Eight months later, another network hired Imus, who resumed the same format and would continue to host it until retiring in 2018; he died in 2019.
- March 2, 2012: Rush Limbaugh, a politically conservative shock jock, was criticized and faced with an advertiser exodus after making comments toward activist Sandra Fluke. Limbaugh was not disciplined for the remarks and survived the controversy, with only two small stations (out of nearly 600) dropping the program in the immediate aftermath of the controversy. The controversy had a much longer impact on talk radio as a whole as advertisers became much more reluctant to have their advertising heard on politically charged programs that were subject to being targeted by pressure groups. Limbaugh died in February 2021, still hosting his program to the end.
- December 2013: Canadian radio shock jock Dean Blundell was indefinitely suspended from CFNY-FM, following reports that he and cohost Derek Welsman had discussed on the air a jury trial in which Welsman was the foreman. The trial had concerned a sexual assault charge against a client of a gay bathhouse, and Blundell and Welsman's commentary about it was criticized both for homophobia and for potentially causing a mistrial by publicly discussing the jury deliberations. The program's cancellation was announced in January 2014.

=== Great Britain ===
- June 2005: Radio DJ Tim Shaw propositioned glamour model Jodie Marsh live on-air on his Kerrang! FM show by announcing he would leave his family for her. This enraged Shaw's wife, who promptly sold his Lotus Esprit on eBay for 50p. Earlier that year he had been suspended for staging a mock burglary at the home of former programme director Andrew Jeffries, and in 2004, after being challenged by listeners, he phoned his sister-in-law live on-air to boast that he fantasized about her during sex with his wife.
- October 18, 2008: (UK) BBC Radio 2 host Russell Brand resigned after calling actor Andrew Sachs and leaving four answering machine messages claiming that he had had sex with his granddaughter with fellow Radio 2 DJ Jonathan Ross.

=== Australia ===
- July 29, 2009: On his morning breakfast radio show, Australian DJ Kyle Sandilands provoked outrage when his "Lie Detector" segment featured a 14-year-old girl who, when quizzed on her sexual history by her mother, broke down, revealing she had been raped at the age of 12. Kyle then said her mother meant any intercourse other than rape. The show was suspended for one week. Sandilands provoked further outrage three days after his suspension expired when he made a slur about Jenny Craig ambassador Magda Szubanski, saying she could have lost more weight in a concentration camp. Sandilands was suspended for ten days without pay, and after a review on September 18, had his suspension extended by three weeks. Sandilands returned to air on October 8, apologized for the incident, and was blessed by a priest at the start of the show.
- December 4, 2012. Australian DJs Mel Greig and Mike Christian made a prank call to a hospital in London where the Duchess of Cambridge was treated for "acute morning sickness", recording and playing the call later on air. After the nurse involved committed suicide the incident received international media coverage.
- June 13, 2013. A Perth radio host Howard Sattler was fired after he asked prime minister Julia Gillard if her partner Tim Mathieson was gay because he was a male hairdresser.

== See also ==
- Low culture
- Censorship in the United States
- Shock humour
- Shock value
- Alan Berg
- Alan Jones
- Alex Jones
- John Laws
- Ray Hadley
- Brian Phelps
- Craig Carton
- Derryn Hinch
- Chris Smith
- Steve Price
- Bubba the Love Sponge
- Petey Greene
- Opie and Anthony
- Rush Limbaugh
- Kyle Sandilands
- Tim Shaw
- Howard Stern
- Wendy Williams
- Giuseppe Cruciani
- Morning zoo
- Stan Zemanek
- Don Imus
- Doug Tracht
- Mark Thompson
- Mark Dolan
- Chuck Dickerson
