= Hit 30 =

- Genre: Music
- Running time: 2 hours (8-10pm Weeknights AEST)
- Country of origin: Australia
- Language: English
- Home station: 2Day FM
- Syndicates: Hit Network
- Hosted by: Angus O'Loughlin; Emma Freedman
- Created by: Southern Cross Austereo (for the Hit Network)
- Executive producer: Sophie Hallwright
- Original release: 28 January 2013 – 14 October 2016
- Audio format: Stereo
- Website: Hit Network

Hit 30 was an Australian radio show hosted by Angus O'Loughlin and Emma Freedman. It was broadcast across the Hit Network from 8-10pm weeknights.

The show was a national music countdown which features the hottest tunes around with a mix of pop culture and big-name celebrity guests. The countdown was fully interactive from every corner of the country.

== History ==
The show commenced as The Bump on 28 January 2013 replacing the Hot 30 Countdown from 7pm-10pm with Angus O'Loughlin as host.

In October 2014 Southern Cross Austereo and Shazam formed a partnership and as a result The Bump was relaunched as Shazam Top 20 on Monday 20 October. Ash London also joined Angus O'Loughlin as host of the show.

In December 2015, Ash London resigned from the show to take on another adventure. During the summer period the show relaunched as the Hit 30.

In January 2016, Emma Freedman replaced London as host.

In October 2016, Angus O'Loughlin and Emma Freedman announced that they would finish on the show on Friday 14 October. O'Loughlin moved to Adelaide to host breakfast on HIT 107 and Freedman joined The Grill Team on Triple M Sydney. Ash London Live replaced the show on Monday 24 October 2016.
