= Chandon Pictures =

2007 Australian TV series

- Genre: Comedy
- Created by: Rob Carlton
- Directed by: Rob Carlton & Alex Weinress
- Starring: Rob Carlton; Josh Lawson; Darren Gilshenan; Rebecca Massey
- Country of origin: Australia
- Original language: English
- No. of seasons: 2
- No. of episodes: 16

Production
- Producer: Rob Carlton
- Production locations: Melbourne & Sydney, Australia
- Running time: 25 Minutes

Original release
- Network: Movie Extra
- Release: 10 November 2007 – 7 May 2009

Chandon Pictures is an Australian comedy television series that premiered on Movie Extra on 10 November 2007 and ended on 7 May 2009.

The series featured sixteen episodes and was a spin-off from a Tropfest short film produced by Rob Carlton and Alex Weinress. It followed the misadventures of a struggling video production company called 'Chandon Pictures.' Rob Carlton, who plays the main character, is the younger cousin of Brian Carlton, The Spoonman talkback host on the Austereo Triple M network. This was revealed when The Spoonman interviewed Rob.

On 10 July 2008, it was announced that the series had won a second season and it had sold format rights to its distributor Lionsgate.

The first season premiered in the UK on Dave on 19 February 2009 in a 10pm slot. It was also aired in the US on the Sundance Channel.

== Cast ==
=== Main / regular ===
- Rob Carlton as Tom Chandon
- Josh Lawson as Carmichael Chandon
- Darren Gilshenan as Nick Brenner
- Rebecca Massey as Lucy Cannon

=== Guests / recurring ===
- Angus Sampson as Bevan (2 episodes)
- Damon Herriman as Scotty Cornish (1 episode)
- Dan Wyllie as Tracks Wilcox (1 episode)
- Don Hany as Boysie (2 episodes)
- Drew Forsythe as Graham Tucker (1 episode)
- Ed Kavalee as David (1 episode)
- Gary Waddell as Dean (2 episodes)
- Graeme Blundell as John (1 episode)
- Heather Mitchell as Agent (1 episode)
- Helen Dallimore as Megan (1 episode)
- Jessica Napier as Annabelle (1 episode)
- Jonathon Dutton as Harley (1 episode)
- Justine Clarke as Samantha (1 episode)
- Kate Mulvany as Maggie (1 episode)
- Kathryn Beck as Sherbert (1 episode)
- Lachy Hulme as Derek (1 episode)
- Lynette Curran as Lorelei (1 episode)
- Marshall Napier as Basil (1 episode)
- Michael Denkha as Andrew (1 episode)
- Penne Hackforth-Jones as Helen (3 episodes)
- Peter Phelps as Eddie Connolly (2 episodes)
- Rhonda Doyle as Melanie (1 episode)
- Roy Billing as Celebrant (1 episode)
- Russell Kiefel as Warwick (4 episodes)
- Teo Gebert as Bruiser (1 episode)
- Tony Llewellyn-Jones as Sherbert's Dad (1 episode)

== Episodes ==
=== Season 1 (2007) ===
No.	Title	Directed by	Written by	Original release date
1	"Cousins"	Rob Carlton & Alex Weinress	Rob Carlton	10 November 2007
2	"Back To School"	Rob Carlton & Alex Weinress	Rob Carlton	17 November 2007
3	"Bevan's Heaven"	Rob Carlton & Alex Weinress	Rob Carlton	24 November 2007
4	"Champion Charles"	Rob Carlton & Alex Weinress	Rob Carlton	1 December 2007
5	"Private Dick"	Rob Carlton & Alex Weinress	Rob Carlton	8 December 2007
6	"Death Wish"	Rob Carlton & Alex Weinress	Rob Carlton	15 December 2007
7	"White Ants"	Rob Carlton & Alex Weinress	Rob Carlton	22 December 2007
8	"Hollywood"	Rob Carlton & Alex Weinress	Rob Carlton	29 December 2007

=== Season 2 (2009) ===
No.	Title	Directed by	Written by	Original release date
9	"The Lifestyle"	Rob Carlton & Alex Weinress	Rob Carlton	19 March 2009
10	"Run Bitch Run"	Rob Carlton & Alex Weinress	Rob Carlton	26 March 2009
11	"Not a Pyramid"	Rob Carlton & Alex Weinress	Rob Carlton	2 April 2009
12	"The Man with the Dancing Fingers"	Rob Carlton & Alex Weinress	Rob Carlton	9 April 2009
13	"She's 22"	Rob Carlton & Alex Weinress	Rob Carlton	16 April 2009
14	"Pack"	Rob Carlton & Alex Weinress	Rob Carlton	23 April 2009
15	"Script is Written"	Rob Carlton & Alex Weinress	Rob Carlton	30 April 2009
16	"Rock$tar"	Rob Carlton & Alex Weinress	Rob Carlton	7 May 2009

== Awards and nominations ==
Year	Award	Category	Recipients and nominees	Result
2008	ASTRA Awards	Most Outstanding Drama	Chandon Pictures	Nominated
2008	Australian Film Institute	Best Performance in a Television Comedy	Rob Carlton	Nominated
2008	Australian Film Institute	Best Television Comedy Series	Chandon Pictures	Nominated
2008	Australian Writers' Guild	Comedy - Situation or Narrative	Rob Carlton (Episode 1: "Cousins")	Nominated
2008	Australian Writers' Guild	Comedy - Situation or Narrative	Rob Carlton (Episode 2: "Return of the Titan")	Nominated
2008	Australian Writers' Guild	Comedy - Situation or Narrative	Rob Carlton (Episode 6: "Death Wish")	Won
2009	Australian Film Institute	Best Television Comedy Series	Chandon Pictures	Nominated
2009	Australian Writers' Guild	Comedy - Situation or Narrative	Rob Carlton (Episode 7: "A Script is Written")	Nominated
2010	Logie Awards	Most Outstanding Light Entertainment Program	Chandon Pictures	Nominated
