= Dolphin Juice =

Australian radio program

- Genre: Comedy
- Running time: 120 Minutes / 2 Hours
- Country of origin: Australia
- Language: English
- Home station: Triple M Sydney
- Hosted by: Barry Goldwater and Bernie Tingles
- Produced by: Garfield and Odie
- Recording studio: Sydney

Dolphin Juice was a comedy radio show broadcast from 9 to 11 pm Sunday nights on Triple M Sydney. It was hosted by Bernie Tingles and Barry Goldwater. There was also a TV version of the show on Television Sydney.
