= ATFS =

ATFS may refer to:

- Artificial transcription factor, an example of a chimeral protein designed to target and modulate gene transcription
- Association of Track and Field Statisticians, an international organisation run by volunteers whose goal is to collect and disseminate the statistics of Track and Field Athletics
- After The Forking Show, the explicit podcast created by the team from Spoonman's Classic Rock Show
- American Tree Farm System, a certification program for tree farms
