= Totally Australia =

- Genre: documentary
- Written by: Tony Ryan (1997); Jo Ariel (1998); Ian Bremner (2004); Stephen Waller (2004)
- Directed by: Michael Ormond (1997-2000); Rob McCall (2001); Ross McIntosh (2001)
- Presented by: Sandra Sully; Sam Harvey; Angela Brown; Stacey Thompson; Sami Lukis; Boyd Duff
- Country of origin: Australia
- Original language: English
- No. of series: 9
- No. of episodes: 85

Production
- Executive producers: Cherrie Bottger; Ian Bremner
- Producers: Jo Ariel; Ian Bremner (2001); Geoffrey Cooper (2001); Ian Bremner (Series 5); Peter Slater (Series 5); Stephen Waller (2004)
- Production locations: Brisbane, Queensland
- Running time: 44 minutes
- Production company: Southern Star Group (1997-1998)

Original release
- Network: Network Ten
- Release: 1997 – 2008

Totally Australia is an Australian children's documentary television series aired on Network Ten in 1997 until 2008 at 6am.
