= Lawrence Mooney =

Australian comedian, actor, writer and television and radio presenter

- Born: 22 April 1965 (age 61); Melbourne, Victoria, Australia
- Occupations: Comedian; actor; writer; television and radio presenter
- Years active: 1992−present
- Spouse: Lou Mooney (m. 2009)
- Children: 2
- Website: Lawrence Mooney

Lawrence Mooney (born 22 April 1965) is an Australian comedian, actor, writer, and former television and radio presenter.

== Radio career ==
Mooney has held various jobs including a customs officer, cleaner, salesman, furniture polisher and collecting golf balls at a driving range, before becoming a stand-up comic. He hosted the drive time show on Melbourne Talk Radio. He has also been a fill-in host and guest on MTR's Steve Vizard Show and ABC Radio Melbourne and 3AW. In 2016, he regularly appeared on the Triple M impersonating Former Prime Minister Malcolm Turnbull with weekly spots on the Sydney and Melbourne breakfast shows, and as a guest co-host on Merrick & Australia. He was part of the morning drive show on Triple M Brisbane from December 2017 to December 2018.

On 15 January 2019, Lawrence replaced The Grill Team for Sydney Breakfast on Triple M with Moonman in the Morning, alongside Gus Worland, Chris Page and Jess Eva. In October 2019, Mooney won an Australian Commercial Radio Award (ACRA) for Best Entertainment Presenter in a metro market. In November 2021, Southern Cross Austereo announced that Mooney had resigned from Triple M. Prior to Mooney's resignation, he had an unexplained absence from Moonman in the Morning.

== Comedy ==
Mooney is best known for his stand-up comedy career in such shows as Lawrence of Suburbia at the 2012 Melbourne International Comedy Festival. He was the winner of the Melbourne Fringe Best Comedy Award in 2011 and also made it to the semi-final in America on NBC’s Last Comic Standing in 2007.

== Television ==
Mooney featured regularly on such television series as Spicks and Specks, Can of Worms, The Einstein Factor, Denise, The Celebrity Chase, Studio 10, The Project, Have You Been Paying Attention? and Hughesy, We Have a Problem. He has also had acting roles in The Cup, Winners and Losers and Conspiracy 365.

In 2012, he appeared in the sketch comedy series Problems and conversational series The Agony of Life. In 2013, Mooney became the presenter of Dirty Laundry Live, a comedy panel game show on the ABC.

In September 2016, Mooney co-hosted In Rio Today, part of the Seven Network's coverage of the 2016 Summer Paralympics, with Mel McLaughlin and Annabelle Williams. In 2025 he appeared as a contestant on Claire Hooper's House Of Games.

== Awards and nominations ==
=== ARIA Music Awards ===
The ARIA Music Awards are a set of annual ceremonies presented by Australian Recording Industry Association (ARIA), which recognise excellence, innovation, and achievement across all genres of the music of Australia. They commenced in 1987.

Year	Nominee / work	Award	Result	Ref.
2018	Moonman	Best Comedy Release	Nominated	
