= Restoring the Balance =

- Running time: 2 hours (Sunday nights)
- Country of origin: Australia
- Home station: Triple J
- Hosted by: Tony Moclair; Julian Schiller; Richard Marsland
- Original release: 16 November 2003 – 11 September 2011

Restoring the Balance was a political satire show on the Australian youth radio station Triple J which began in 2003. Its premise was that the station was forced by the ABC Board to broadcast two hours of conservative views to contrast the supposed left-leaning ideology of other Triple J presenters. It was hosted by young Liberal Stirling Addison (played by Tony Moclair), young National Tom Thomlinson (Julian Schiller) and young Family First member Spencer Penrose (Richard Marsland).

== Format ==
Restoring the Balance was first broadcast in 2004 as a temporary substitute for Roy and HG's This Sporting Life. The program returned in March 2007, in the absence of John Safran's Sunday Night Safran as he went overseas for 10 weeks. Its third and final run was from 7 August 2011 until 11 September 2011.

Each episode would begin with the same disclaimer:

"Thanks to the intervention of the ABC Board and the generous support of the Macquarie Bank, Triple J reluctantly presents the following two hours of unbiased, fair and balanced coverage of the week's topical issues. All stand for the national anthem."

Many listeners would not understand the program was satire, and would text in complaining about the extreme values being presented.

== Characters ==
Restoring the Balance featured the affluent and snobbish characters of:

- Stirling Addison, a young Liberal who graduated from Sydney Grammar School, and was a royal tennis champion. Played by Tony Moclair.
- Tom Thomlinson, a young National who graduated from Geelong Grammar School, then studied agricultural science and banking at Bond University after failing his first year twice. Played by Julian Schiller.
- Spencer Penrose, a young Family First member. Played by Richard Marsland.
