= Emma Freedman =

Australian television and radio presenter

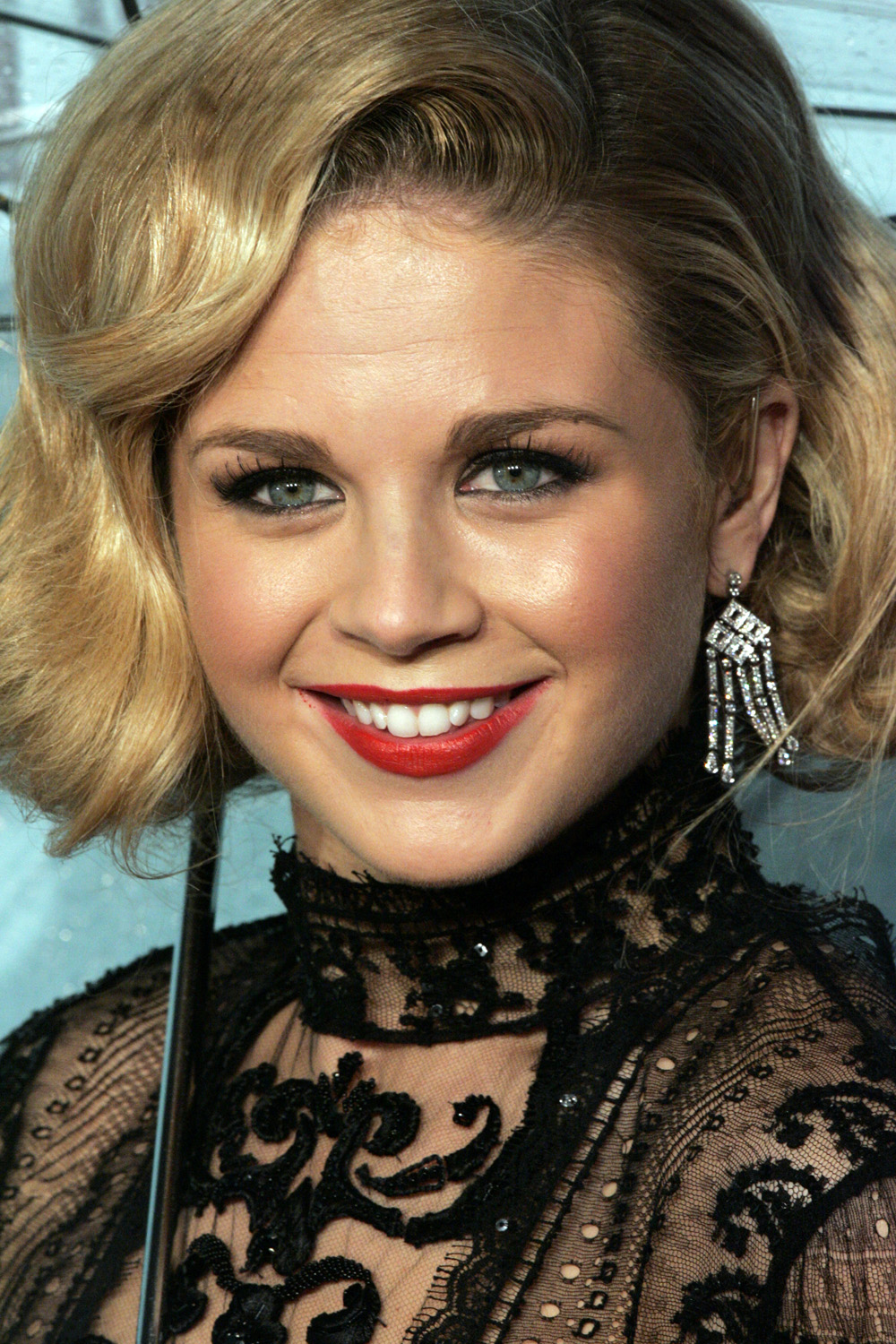
- Born: Emma Jane Freedman; Sydney, New South Wales, Australia
- Occupations: Television and radio presenter
- Years active: 2010−present

Emma Freedman is an Australian television and radio personality, currently working as a host, presenter and roving reporter across Seven Sport since 2021.

Freedman grew up on the Mornington Peninsula in Melbourne. Freedman formerly co-hosted The Grill Team on Triple M Sydney. Prior to this, she was a weather presenter on Weekend Today and host of Sports Sunday on the Nine Network.

== Career ==
=== Radio and television ===
In 2010, Freedman joined Weekend Today as a weather presenter, replacing Felicity Whelan, after which she shared hosting duties with Steven Jacobs as a weather presenter for Today. She was a regular contributor to the Nine Network's coverage of the Melbourne Spring Racing Carnival for many years. Freedman was also a regular sports presenter on the Nine Network's Wide World of Sports and Weekend Today. In December 2014, Freedman was made redundant from the Nine Network due to cost-cutting measures.

In 2015, Freedman competed in and won the fifteenth season of Dancing with the Stars partnered with Aric Yegudkin.

In January 2015, Jules Lund and Freedman were announced as hosts of The Scoopla Show which aired on the Hit Network. She was appointed national drive news presenter on Hit Network in September 2015. In February 2016, she re-signed with Southern Cross Austereo to host the Hit 30 and Take 40 Australia across the Hit Network. In October 2016, she moved from the Hit Network to Triple M Sydney to co-host The Grill Team.

In March 2016, Freedman rejoined Nine Network to host the Wide World of Sports. She was appointed host of Sports Sunday in March 2017.

In March 2018, Freedman joined the team of presenters on Foxtel's Fox League channel.

In 2021, she officially joined Seven Sport, hosting the 7mate feed of the morning coverage for the 2020 Tokyo Olympics. In October 2021, she joined Seven's horse racing coverage hosting Sydney racing. Freedman has quickly established herself as a major player in the Seven Sport stables, also working on their Winter Olympics, Commonwealth Games and now cricket, AFL Brownlow Medal & Grand Final and V8 Supercars.

In July 2026, Freedman co-hosted Seven's prime time Glasgow 2026 Commonwealth Games coverage with Matt Shirvington, replacing Hamish McLachlan and Abbey Gelmi who previously hosted this session for Birmingham 2022, Beijing 2022 and Tokyo 2020.

=== Writing ===
Freedman's ballet-themed coming of age novel, Turning Pointes, was published by HarperCollins in 2016.

== Personal life ==
Freedman is the daughter of five-time Melbourne Cup winning thoroughbred horse trainer Lee Freedman.
