= Julian Schiller =

Australian TV and radio personality

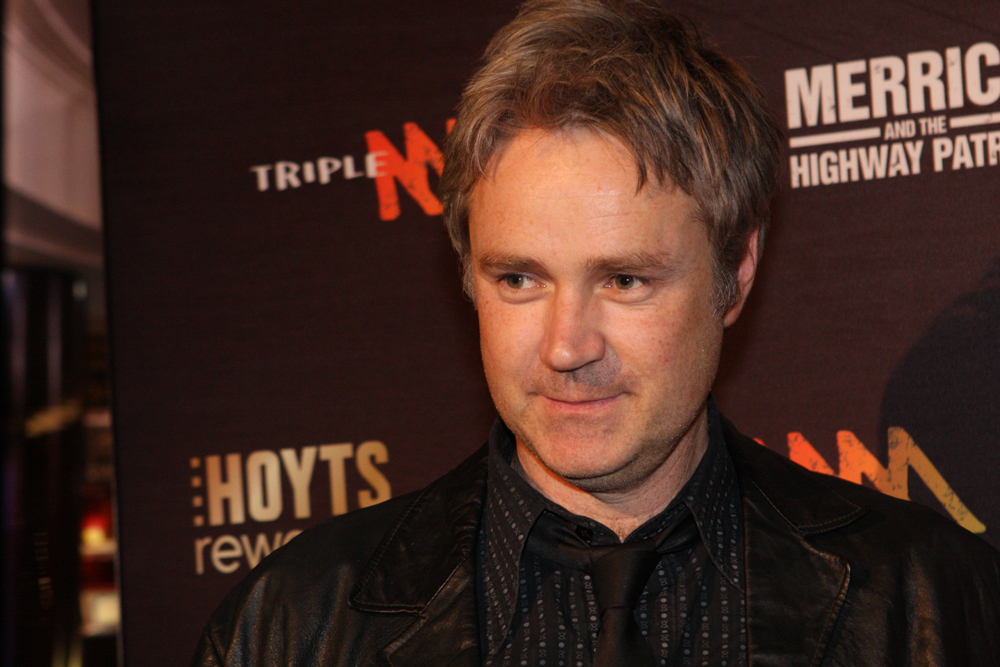
Jules Schiller

Julian "Jules" Schiller is an Australian TV and radio personality.

Schiller currently hosts Breakfast on ABC Radio Adelaide.

He previously worked at Nova 91.9, Triple M, Fox Sports, and The Project.

== Radio ==
In 1993 Schiller started writing and performing radio serials at Melbourne community station 3RRR along with Tony Moclair. In 1995 Schiller and Moclair began making appearances on the Breakfasters show with James Young, Chris Hatzis and Kate Langbroek.

In 1997 Schiller and Moclair were signed by Triple M where they hosted a national night show called CRUD. They were promoted to Drive in 1999-2000. During this time Schiller co-wrote a radio character called Guido Hatzis which was performed by Moclair. The pair released three albums with Universal music and won two Aria Awards in 2000 and 2001.

From 2000-2002 Schiller and Moclair worked at Austereo MCM hosting a show called The Flying Squad which was networked across Australia.

From 2002-2004, Schiller and Moclair wrote and performed a show called Restoring the Balance for Triple J. The show was political satire and interviewed notable politicians such as Bill Shorten and Julie Bishop.

In 2004 Schiller signed to Nova 91.9 and co-hosted their Breakfast show in Adelaide. He was joined by Moclair, Ryan Fitzgerald and Jodie J Hill. He left in 2010.

From 2012-2013 Schiller signed to Triple M to co-host a national drive show called Merrick and the Highway Patrol along with Merrick Watts and Rachel Corbett. He also regularly co-hosted Merrick and Australia alongside Merrick Watts on Triple M.

In January 2017, ABC announced that Schiller would host Drive on ABC Radio Adelaide from Monday to Thursday.

In January 2024, Schiller moved to present Breakfast with Sonya Feldhoff.

== TV ==
Schiller has been a regular presenter on The Project on Network Ten both as a panellist and roving reporter. Most notably he has covered major events such as the 2010-11 Queensland floods, Christchurch earthquake and Sochi Winter Olympics.

Schiller was a regular panelist on The Back Page on Fox Sports hosted by Tony Squires (2013–2017).

In 2013 Schiller began co-writing and presenting a comedy segment called The B League along with Sam Mac. It focused mainly on the Hyundai A League and was aired on Fox Sports. He still produces this with the FFA. And it can be found on Facebook.

In 2010 Schiller also co-hosted a panel show called The White Room on the Seven Network. The show also featured Lawrence Mooney, Dave Thornton, Felicity Ward and Georgina McEnroe.

Schiller has also appeared on The Panel and Good News Week.

In April 2017 he revealed that he had a seizure and publicly discussed his epileptic condition on a live interview to raise awareness and to tackle stigma.
