= Alexis Savaidis =

Australian radio personality (born 1983)

Alexis Savaidis (born 1983) is an Australian radio personality.

Savaidis has previously been co-host of the Hot30 Countdown and Take 40 Australia on the Today Network.

== Career ==
Savaidis began her radio career at 5YYY FM, Whyalla, South Australia, a community radio station. She then progressed through a series of positions at radio stations around Australia including 5CS (Port Pirie), 104.7 (Canberra) and SAFM (Adelaide), where she became operations manager.

While at SAFM Savaidis was awarded the Austereo Adelaide Award for having the highest rating FM shift in Adelaide, her third Austereo award.

In 2006, Savaidis battled throat nodules which threatened her career.

In May 2011, Alexis married partner Matt Kuchel.
