= Craig Low =

Australian comedian

Craig Michael Low
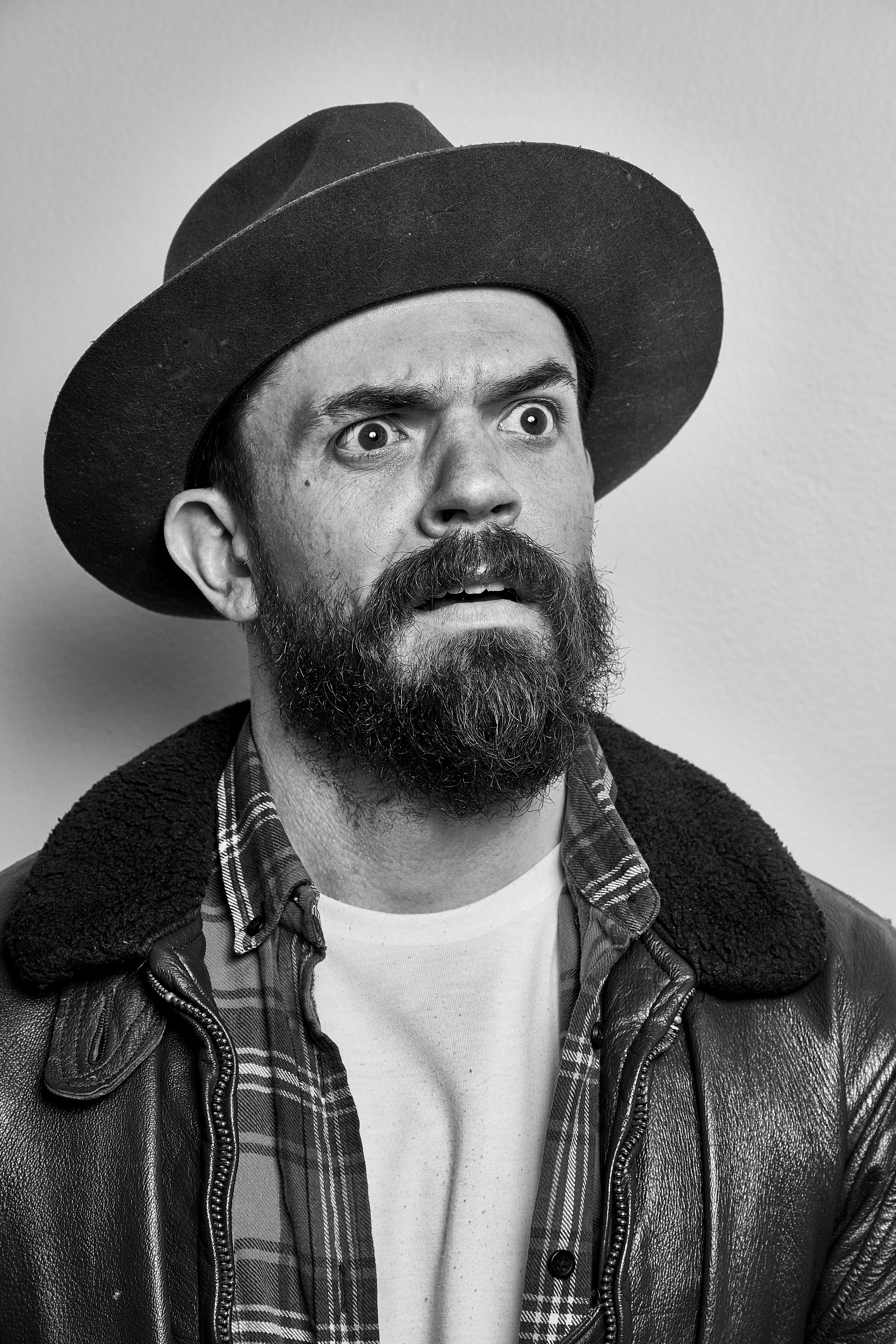
- Born: 8 May 1985 (age 40); Helensvale, Queensland, Australia
- Occupations: Writer, Producer, Director & comedian
- Years active: 2005-present

Craig Low (born 8 May 1985) is an Australian writer, producer, director & comedian. He is known publicly as "Lowie”.

== Early life ==
Low was born on 8 May 1985 in Helensvale, Queensland. His family grew up in the small community of Helensvale, where he attended Helensvale State Primary School and Helensvale State High School.

== Radio ==
Low began working at Sea FM 90.9 on the Gold Coast when he was 15 years old as a junior in audio production and was nominated for his first Australian Commercial Radio Award (ACRA). He was put on Mid-Dawns (12 am-5 am) and then shifted to B105 to host Australian Made, a late-night syndicated program (now called Australian First) that plays 100 percent Australian content. Within 6 months of moving to Brisbane, Craig filled in for the Hot30 Countdown over the summer period. He stayed on to host the show for just under 1 year. Ratings success differed from state to state, but it was regularly the number 1 FM show in the 7pm-12am time slot. Craig and Austereo parted ways in 2006.

Low returned to radio in 2009 with a new show, Lowie vs America for Southern Cross Media. The show earned him 3 ACRA Nominations in 2010.

Low was to be the host of the KIIS 97.3 breakfast show in 2026. In December 2025, it was announced that Robin, Kip and Corey Oates would return to KIIS 97.3 Breakfast, and that Low would move to a new National Nights to host Lowie Live on the KIIS Network, from 9PM-12AM.

== Television ==
Low has written for several NBC television projects including the clip series The Worst Thing I Ever... for the E! Network. In 2014, Low made his US TV Debut on Fox's stand-up comedy series Laughs.

In 2015, Low was cast as a season regular on MTV2's Joking Off. Defy Media has also confirmed a development deal with Lowie with a pilot being green-lit under the working title Lowie Sucks for release later this year.

Low signed on with FOX8 in Australia to host Road to Rock Star. The series went around Australia as they hunted for Australia music talent to become hopefuls on the American series titles Rock Star Supernova. The band consisted of Tommy Lee (Mötley Crüe), Gilby Clarke (Guns N' Roses) and Jason Newsted (Metallica).

CD Live, a Saturday night live countdown show hosted by Low and Asha Keurten on FOX8. Due to run for 13 episodes, but was expanded to 22.

Ralph TV, based on the Australia Men's Magazine Ralph and broadcast on the Nine Network on Thursday nights during 2008. The TV series was released on DVD along with the magazine.

== Stand Up ==
His one-man show Name Dropping with Craig Low debut at the Melbourne International Comedy Festival in 2018 with one reviewer writing “I can tell you firsthand it will have you laughing so hard you’ll wish the toilet was 5 foot closer”. Craig was to record his one hour special in March 2020 but it has since been postponed due to the global pandemic.

== Acting ==
Craig's first role was opposite Heath Ledger in the 1997 TV series Roar. After many various commercial roles, he left to focus on School. After moving to LA permanently in 2015, Craig returned to acting with roles in The Muppets, 5 Years Apart, Ghost Story Club on TruTV and short films My Girlfriend From Hell, Accents and Founder.

== Directing ==
After working as both assistant director and producer for over 80 episodes of television for El Rey Network, Craig made his directorial debut with the horror short film DON’T TOUCH which he also wrote and produced during the quarantine.

== Filmography ==
Low was involved in the following films:

TITLE	YEAR	ACTOR	WRITER	PRODUCER	DIRECTOR	ROLE
Roar	1997	YES	NO	NO	NO	Child By Fire
CD Live	2003	YES	YES	NO	NO	Host
Ralph TV	2005	YES	YES	YES	NO	Host & associate Producer
Road To Rockstar	2006	YES	NO	NO	NO	Host
Worst Thing I Ever…	2014	NO	YES	YES	NO	Associate Producer
Laughs	2014	YES	YES	NO	NO	Himself
Joking Off	2016	YES	YES	NO	NO	Himself
Pop Of The List	2017	YES	YES	NO	NO	Host
That's Totally Almost Music	2017	YES	YES	YES	YES	Host
Ridiculousness Live	2017	NO	YES	YES	NO	Associate Producer
The Daily Drama	2018	YES	YES	NO	NO	Himself
The Muppets	2018	YES	NO	NO	NO	Mr. Tumnus
Ghost Story Club	2018	YES	NO	NO	NO	Phillippe Fournier
BET Hip Hop Awards	2018	YES	YES	NO	NO	Permit Patty
5 Years Apart	2018	YES	NO	NO	NO	Mark
My Girlfriend From Hell	2019	YES	NO	NO	NO	Adam
Accents	2019	YES	NO	NO	NO	Lee
Foundher	2019	YES	NO	NO	NO	Isaac
The Chuey Martinez Show	2019	NO	YES	YES	YES	40 episodes
El Rey Nation	2019	NO	YES	YES	YES	40 episodes
Vampiro Unleashed	2020	NO	YES	YES	YES	6 episodes
DON'T TOUCH	2020	NO	YES	YES	YES	Short Film
