= Brian Carlton =

Australian radio personality

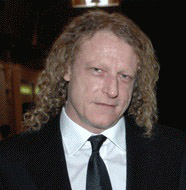
- Born: 27 December 1962 (age 63); Australia
- Occupations: Radio announcer and Journalist

Brian Carlton (born 27 December 1962) is an Australian radio announcer, producer and journalist. He is known professionally as The Spoonman.

== Early life ==
Carlton was born in Australia, into a Catholic household. He grew up in Beacon Hill on Sydney's Northern Beaches, and finished high school in 1980. Working several jobs, including a bank manager, he entered the radio industry at age 21. After six years, Carlton was chosen to head up a major metropolitan radio station, becoming the youngest ever talk back host.

== Career ==
Carlton has worked on a number of Sydney radio stations, including 2UE and 2GB, In the on air presenting and producing roles. Until end of 2008, he was a talk back presenter on the radio station Triple M, using the moniker The Spoonman.

Spoonman was the weekday newsreader on Triple M Sydney, featuring in three separate news "rants" throughout the day as well as appearing on Triple M's program The Grill Team, but in October 2012 he was notified that his contract would not be renewed for 2013. From 3 February 2012, he hosted a show on Newstalk 2UE, called 'The Stir' With Brian Carlton. The show runs in 6 pm – 8 pm. Carlton is Also Executive Producer of Jason Morrison's Drive show, also on 2UE.

Carlton anchored a new local talk show, broadcast across Northern and North West Tasmania on Tasmanian Broadcasters Stations LAFM Launceston, 7BU Burnie, 7AD Devonport, 7SD Scottsdale and 7XS Queenstown. He announced his resignation for "personal reasons" 5 October 2019, saying he would finish up three weeks later, however his final broadcast was the following Monday 7 October.

On 30 October 2019, Triple M Hobart announced Brian Carlton would be taking on the breakfast show in Hobart after it axed the popular Dave Noonan show. He left Triple M in February 2022.

== Views and opinions ==
Carlton was born into a Catholic household but states openly that he is an atheist. He is a strong endorser of Richard Dawkins' book, The God Delusion.

Spoonman is known for his outspoken opinions on censorship, freedom and the current War on terror.
