= Sports Sunday =

- Genre: Sports
- Presented by: Roz Kelly
- Starring: Mark Taylor; Gus Worland
- Country of origin: Australia
- Original language: English
- No. of seasons: 7
- No. of episodes: 264

Production
- Production locations: 1 Denison Street, North Sydney, New South Wales
- Camera setup: Multiple-camera setup
- Running time: 60 minutes (including commercials)

Original release
- Network: Nine Network
- Release: 5 March 2017 – 12 November 2023

Related
- Wide World of Sports

Sports Sunday was an Australian sports television program that was broadcast on the Nine Network at 10.00am Sunday mornings. The show was hosted by journalist Roz Kelly, with a roster of rotating panelists including former Australian cricket captain Mark Taylor, radio host Gus Worland and journalist Sean Maloney.

The weekly show featured discussions and debates on the previous week's sporting news and events, along with guest interviews and other sporting highlights from both Australia and internationally.

On 3 March 2024, the show was rebranded as a revival of Wide World of Sports.

== History ==
The show aired its debut episode on 5 March 2017, and was a replacement for the long running Wide World of Sports program after host Ken Sutcliffe's retirement in 2016. The debut season was hosted by television presenter Emma Freedman.

It was announced on 8 February 2018 that host Emma Freedman had left the Nine Network to take up a position at the NRL-based channel Fox League. James Bracey replaced Freedman as host from 2018.

Journalist Roz Kelly took over the hosting role from Bracey in May 2022, following his appointment to sports presenter of Sydney's nightly Nine News bulletin.

Nick McArdle, James Bracey and Emma Lawrence were the primary fill in hosts whenever Roz Kelly is unavailable.

The show was rebranded as Wide World of Sports on 3 March 2024.

== Regular panelists ==
- Mark Bosnich
- Casey Dellacqua
- Craig Foster
- Sam Groth
- Chloe Dalton
- Sean Maloney
- Mark Taylor
- Todd Woodbridge
- Gus Worland

== Former hosts and panelists ==
- Emma Freedman (host, 2017)
- Peter FitzSimons (regular panelist, 2017-2021)
- Neil Breen (regular panelist, 2017-2020)
- Shane Crawford (regular panelist, 2017-2021)
- Michael Slater (regular panelist, 2017-2018)
- Liz Ellis (regular panelist, 2017-2022)
- Richard Freedman
- James Bracey (host, 2018-2022)

== See also ==
- List of Australian television series
- List of programs broadcast by Nine Network
