= Chris Page =

Australian radio personality

- Born: Christopher Page
- Presenting career
- Show: Weekend Breakfast
- Station: Triple M Sydney
- Time slot: Breakfast
- Country: Australia
- Previous show: The Grill Team

Chris Page is an Australian radio presenter.

Page originally worked for NXFM as an announcer and then moved to SAFM. On 6 December 2009, Page moved to Sydney's 2Day FM, following the top rated Kyle and Jackie O Show. Page has filled in for the duo.

Page hosted the national chart show Hot30 Countdown across the Today Network. He and co-host Charli Delaney debuted on 15 March 2010 after successfully filling in for the regular hosts as well as a temporary nighttime show on both the Fox FM and 2Day FM from August to November 2009. This led them to host a new Saturday night program entitled Party People, which began broadcasting in December 2009 and was heard nationally.

In 2011, Chris joined Triple M Sydney's The Grill Team. On 15 January 2019 the Grill Team was replaced with Moonman in the Morning and subsequently morphed into Triple M Breakfast with MG Jess and Pagey after the departure of Lawrence Mooney from Triple M.

After missing four weeks on his breakfast show, Page announced on air on 9 August 2021 that he had spent the past month in rehab, opening up about his addiction to alcohol. "There’s a stigma around rehab", he said. "If people can’t be open about it then no one’s going to talk about it and then that stigma grows".

On 5 October 2022, Chris announced he was leaving Triple M at the end of the year, he was MIA for the last month of the show. On 24 November, it was announced the Triple M Breakfast was being axed with the final show being broadcast on 25 November with Chris re-joining the show for the final time. Later that day it was announced the show was being replaced with Mick and MG in the Morning, seeing Mick Molloy return to Triple M after a year away from radio.

In May 2024, Page joined the KIIS Network as host of weekend breakfast. In October 2026, Chris announced that he would be parting ways with ARN and the KIIS Network.

Preceded by Tim Lee and Carla "Biggzy" Bignasca	Hot30 Countdown co-host (with Charli Delaney); 2010	Succeeded by Hot30 Countdown Matt and Maude
