= Jelli =

Radio advertising technology firm

- Type: Private
- Industry: Advertising technology
- Founded: 2008
- Founders: Mike Dougherty, Jateen Parekh
- Headquarters: San Mateo, California, United States
- Products: SpotPlan, RadioSpot
- Website: www.jelli.com

Jelli is a San Mateo, California-based advertising technology firm, which develops solutions for the programmatic sale and airplay of radio advertising.

The company was originally established as a provider of interactive music programming for radio stations, in which listeners were able to upvote and downvote songs played by a particular station in real-time (with songs disliked by listeners being automatically stopped and replaced by a different song). The company introduced its advertising platform in 2012, which eventually became its main business in 2014. iHeartMedia acquired Jelli in December 2018.

== History ==
=== Crowdsourced broadcasting ===
In 2009, Jelli was founded by Michael Dougherty, formerly of Tellme Networks, and Jateen Parekh, formerly of the Amazon Kindle Project. Based on the concept of crowdsourcing, Jelli offered a modernized version of an all-request show, and was promoted as a "multiplayer video game on a radio station". Jelli debuted on CBS Radio-owned KITS in San Francisco on June 28, 2009. After starting out with a Sunday night Jelli show on KITS in 2009, Jelli was further expanded to a Monday through Friday night show called "Free for All" in January 2010, hosted by DJ White Menace. Jelli shows were broadcast on KITS six nights a week.

Listeners would select songs for a station via Jelli's website and mobile app. Users could upvote and downvote songs to determine the next song, and issue "Rocks" and "Sucks" votes for songs currently playing — with songs immediately stopped if they receive too many "Sucks" votes. Users could also be awarded "Rockets" and "Bombs" to move songs up and down on the app's charts.

Jelli's success with KITS led to a further expansion of Jelli to other radio stations, and in October 2009, Jelli announced a syndication deal to distribute its programming throughout the United States through the Triton Media Group beginning in early 2010. In May 2011, Jelli announced it would launch a 24/7 version of its format in the Las Vegas metropolitan area. On June 30, 2011, KXLI and KYLI launched the new Jelli formats, with KXLI carrying a rock format, and KYLI carrying "Top 40 Remix" (a dance radio format featuring electronic dance music and remixes of current pop hits).

Jelli was also part of a partnership with Austereo, involving a station called Hot 30 Jelli, which was launched on November 1, 2009. The station was then renamed to Choose The Hits on February 1, 2010. It was broadcast online, on DAB and overnights on 2Day FM in Sydney, Fox FM in Melbourne, B105 in Brisbane, SAFM in Adelaide and 92.9 in Perth between 10:15pm and midnight on Monday to Thursday nights. The Austereo partnership was terminated effective May 24, 2010, and Jelli is no longer being carried on the air in Australia.

=== Programmatic advertising ===
On June 29, 2012, Jelli formally announced its new programmatic advertising platform, RadioSpot. The cloud-based platform functions through a server installed by the station that is triggered by station traffic and automation software. The software also produces logs viewable in real time. Ad copy can be changed with just one to two minutes of lead time.

In March 2014, Jelli unveiled SpotPlan and an API, allowing for advertisers to buy ad time and compare stations through an online interface.

On June 29, 2014, Jelli officially ended its listener-controlled radio services. The move was preceded by the remaining Jelli stations bailing on the format. In 2012, KXLI dropped Jelli when it was sold to a new company who instated a new Spanish-language format. On June 24, 2014, KYLI was relaunched with a variant of the Pulse 87 dance/EDM brand, known as Pulse 96.7. On June 26, Jelli announced it would cease operations; classic rock WJLI in Paducah, Kentucky, and Top 40/CHR KSKR-FM in Roseburg, Oregon immediately dropped the "Jelli" moniker and the platform altogether. The remaining affiliated stations continued to broadcast Jelli shows until 11:59 p.m.(PDT) on June 29, 2014, when the platform shut down for good.

==== Adoption ====
Within two years, Jelli had 360 stations on RadioSpot, with large broadcasters including Sun Broadcasting Group, Townsquare Media, and Entercom. Additionally, RadioSpot had entered several new large markets with its debut on WQHT in New York, WPWX and WSRB in Chicago, KKDA-FM in Dallas and WDJQ in Cleveland. Later in 2014, Emmis Communications added WBLS to RadioSpot, and Beasley Broadcast Group entered with stations in Philadelphia, Miami and Las Vegas.

In 2015, iHeartMedia introduced a new programmatic solution for its stations powered by Jelli.

Jelli was acquired by iHeartMedia in December 2018.
