= Penne Dennison =

Australian television presenter

- Born: 3 September 1969 (age 56)
- Occupations: Television personality, music TV show presenter
- Known for: Hey Hey, It's Saturday

Penne Dennison (born 3 September 1969) is an Australian music and television entertainment presenter.

== Career ==
Dennison's first role as a television presenter was on WIN Television Wollongong. Penne has previously appeared on a national radio program hosted by Barry Bissell, Barry Bissell’s Weekly Countdown as an entertainment news and reporter for the show.

In 1998-1999 she was the original co-host with Jade Gatt on the late night live music program Ground Zero, later joined by Ugly Phil O’Neil and Jackie O, which was televised live on the Ten Network. She has also worked on Hey Hey It’s Saturday, hosted by Daryl Somers in the late 1990s. She also returned for the show's brief 2009–10 revival.

Later she worked on Take 40 Australia, and was as a presenter on Mornings with Kerri-Anne. She also presented on Foxtel's Movie Network.

== Personal life ==
Dennison is divorced to Steven Marks (co-founder of Guzman y Gomez), and has two daughters.
