= Tony Moclair =

Australian comedy actor, writer, performer and radio broadcaster

- Born: 4 September 1969 (age 57); County Cork, Ireland
- Occupations: Comedy actor; writer; performer; radio broadcaster
- Employer(s): Freelance performer and writer for 3AW
- Children: 2

Tony Moclair (born 4 September 1969, County Cork, Ireland) is an Australian comedian, actor, writer, performer, and radio broadcaster.

Renowned for his versatility, Moclair has contributed to numerous Australian radio networks, frequently showcasing his talent by performing as distinctive characters rather than appearing as himself.

== Radio ==
Moclair has built a successful and diverse career in radio, hosting programs across various Australian stations.

=== 3RRR ===
Moclair, also known as Tony Kelly, teamed up with Chris Hatzis and Julian Schiller to host the long-running breakfast program The Breakfasters on 3RRR 102.7 FM.

=== Nova 91.9 ===
In August 2004, Moclair joined Nova 91.9 as a co-host of the breakfast radio show Jodie, Jules and Tony, with Ryan, alongside Jodie J. Hill, Jules Schiller and Ryan "Fitzy" Fitzgerald He remained part of the program until 2006.

=== ABC Radio Adelaide ===
In the mid 2000s, Moclair hosted weekday breakfast radio on ABC Radio Adelaide.

=== ABC Radio Melbourne ===
Moclair, alongside Rachel Berger, co-hosted the breakfast program on ABC Radio Melbourne during the 2007/2008 summer season. Additionally, he made appearances on The Conversation Hour with Jon Faine.

=== Triple M ===
In late 2008, Moclair stepped in as a guest co-host of The Shebang radio program, filling in for Marty Sheargold. The following year, he was appointed as breakfast co-host on The Hot Breakfast, joining Eddie McGuire, Luke Darcy, and Mieke Buchan.

Prior to the launch of The Hot Breakfast, Moclair contributed to the Pete and Myf show following the passing of Richard Marsland. Rather than appearing as himself, Moclair brought humor to the program through a range of recurring characters, including Tom Cruise, Colin the Taxi Driver, and Clem, the show's oldest listener. He also wrote sketches for the show, showcasing his creative flair.

In August 2009, Moclair and Mike Fitzpatrick temporarily hosted breakfast programming after Pete and Myf was axed. Moclair's tenure on The Hot Breakfast came to an end in June 2010.

=== 3AW ===
In 2011, Moclair joined 3AW's The Weekend Break, replacing Sam Pang on the segment "The Sunday Roast", alongside John Origlasso. He also became a regular contributor to Denis Walter's Afternoon program and occasionally filled in as host for both the weekday and weekend editions of Melbourne Overnight.

In October 2015, Moclair debuted Friday Night Lights, airing from 8–10 pm on Friday evenings during the summer on 3AW. The following year, in August 2016, he was signed to host the midnight-to-dawn show, Australia Overnight.

On 10 January 2020, it was announced via Facebook that Moclair would not be returning to Australia Overnight in 2020, because the show was set to be replaced by a networked program hosted from Sydney by Michael McLaren. That decision drew significant backlash from listeners, who expressed their dissatisfaction through Facebook and a petition urging Nine Entertainment, the new owners of 3AW, to reverse the decision.

On 25 April 2020, less than four months after his departure, it was announced that Moclair would return to host Australia Overnight, beginning 27 April 2020. He was joined by Bianca Johnston, his former producer and panel operator. In February 2022, Johnston transitioned to the Afternoon program, with Sean Woodward stepping in as producer.

In September 2023, 3AW revealed that Moclair would succeed Dee Dee Dunleavy as host of Afternoons. Interim hosts Jacqueline Felgate and Jimmy Bartel filled the role until Moclair began hosting on 30 October 2023.

== Characters ==
Moclair's work showcases his versatility, spanning roles as himself and performances as a variety of character creations.

=== Guido Hatzis ===
Guido Hatzis is a Greek-Australian comedic character created by Tony Moclair and Julian Schiller, voiced by Moclair. The character first appeared in the duo's radio program Crud on the Triple M network. Guido's humor typically involved prank calls featuring exaggerated claims about his appearance and abilities. The popularity of Guido Hatzis led to the release of several albums, including Do Not Talk Over Me (1999), which achieved platinum sales and won the 2001 ARIA Award for Best Comedy Release; Whatever (2000), also with platinum sales and the 2002 ARIA Award for Best Comedy Release; and Deported (2002), which achieved gold sales. Moclair drew inspiration for Guido's surname from Chris Hatzis, a fellow broadcaster, actor, and producer of Crud.

=== Restoring the Balance ===
Restoring the Balance was a satirical radio segment broadcast intermittently in 2003–2004, 2007, and 2011 on Triple J. The segment humorously highlighted the contrasting political views between the conservative Howard government and the predominantly left-leaning, government-funded Triple J radio station.

=== DJ Domm ===
In October 2007, Triple M introduced a podcast-only show featuring Moclair's new character, DJ Domm. The show ran for 21 episodes before being discontinued.

== Writing ==
Moclair has contributed as a writer for Shaun Micallef's Newstopia on SBS and currently writes for Mad As Hell and Spicks and Specks, both on ABC.

A keen enthusiast of modern military history and military aviation, Moclair often shares his insights during his on-air radio segments. He is a regular contributor to military magazines and writes a monthly feature for Australian Aviation Magazine.

== Television ==
Moclair has appeared on ABC's The Einstein Factor as a member of the Brains Trust and was a contestant on Channel 10's Joker Poker. Additionally, he played the role of Bingo in Season 3 of The Librarians and made a guest appearance in Episode 4 of Upper Middle Bogan.

== Personal life ==
Born in Cork, Ireland, in 1969, Moclair is the sixth of eight children and the last to be born in Ireland. He has three brothers and four sisters. In December 2006, after the birth of his first child, he and his wife settled in Melbourne.

Moclair graduated from Monash University in 1991 with a Bachelor of Arts, majoring in history and English literature.

A devoted supporter of the Carlton Football Club, Moclair co-hosts their podcasts.
