= Choose the Hits =

Choose The Hits
- Sydney, Melbourne, Brisbane, Adelaide and Perth; Australia
- Broadcast area: Online
- Frequency: DAB+

Programming
- Format: CHR Requests

Ownership
- Owner: Austereo

History
- First air date: 1 February 2010 – 21 May 2010

Choose The Hits was an all request Australian national Digital Radio station. It was run by Austereo and was renamed on 1 February 2010. Previously the station was trialed with the name Hot30 Jelli, launching on November 27, 2009. The radio station ceased broadcast on 21 May 2010.

The station was powered by the Jelli platform.

== Online ==
The service had a national interactive version. Listeners could choose what song to air next via finding a song in the music catalogue. The one with the most "Rocks" by users would become the next song played. The song with the most "Sucks" by users would be taken off air and not played.

== Programming ==
The playlist included the most popular Contemporary Hit Radio songs from the past decade. It was on live on stations of the Today Network from 10pm-1am from Monday-Thursday. The radio broadcast was hosted by Sarah Maree Cameron.

== Availability ==
The station was heard on DAB+ radios in Sydney, Melbourne, Brisbane, Adelaide and Perth.

A simulcast of the station was also broadcast on 2Day FM in Sydney, Fox FM in Melbourne, B105 in Brisbane, SAFM in Adelaide and 92.9 in Perth between 10:15pm and 1am on Monday to Thursday nights. The last simulcast went to air on 20 May 2010.

The station also streamed online at the Choose The Hits website.

Since the service's closure, website users are being forwarded to the main Jelli page if they attempt to reach the Choose The Hits section of the website.
