= Merrick and the Highway Patrol =

Merrick and the Highway Patrol was an Australian radio show, presented by Merrick Watts, Julian Schiller and Rachel Corbett which aired on Triple M as well as regional stations nationwide. The show launched on 27 February 2012 and aired 4 pm to 6 pm weekdays on 4MMM and 2MMM, 6 pm to 8 pm weekdays on 3MMM and 5MMM and 5 pm to 7 pm weekdays on regional stations. The show ended on 28 November 2013.
