= The Spoonman =

- Nothing Sacred, No Topic Taboo, Everything is Utterly Fair Game
- Genre: Talkback (With Music)
- Running time: 180 Minutes / 3 Hours
- Country of origin: Australia
- Language: English
- Home station: Triple M Sydney
- Syndicates: Triple M Melbourne; Triple M Brisbane
- Hosted by: Brian Carlton
- Recording studio: Triple M Sydney
- Original release: 28 November 2008
- Opening theme: Spoonman – Soundgarden
- Podcast: Official Podcasts

The Spoonman was an Australian late night talk back show hosted by radio personality Brian Carlton. Carlton is known professionally as "Spoonman". The show ran from 1998 to 2008, and was rebooted in 2019.

== The Show ==
The original version of the show was broadcast from the Austereo studios, Sydney and networked to Triple M stations across Australia. Slogans for the show included "No Topic Taboo" and "Everything is utterly fair game".

Listeners could contribute to the show via phone, SMS, email or online web form at the Triple M website. The show could also be heard live online, or a podcast downloaded from the Triple M website. Due to the late time slot of the show, callers were often intoxicated.

The show was also unique in being one of the only radio shows on the Commercial FM band in Australia to feature traditional talk back style programming- it competed with other late night AM band shows such as "Tony Delroy's Nightlife" on ABC Local Radio.

== The Staff ==
The show is hosted by Brian Carlton, who calls himself 'The Spoonman' on air, and occasionally featured input from the show producers and panel operators, nicknamed 'Garfield' and 'Odie'.

The Spoonman's nickname came about as a collaboration between himself and management. Inspiration for the name is claimed from the Soundgarden song Spoonman, and also from Brian's character as a "self-professed 'stirrer'". Several versions of his on-air name are frequently used by callers, including "Spoony"/"Spoonie".

It is understood that Garfield's nickname originates from an instance whereby he gave a fellow staff member a copy of the movie 'Garfield' for their child's birthday- Odie received his nickname from the name of the dog also featured in the Garfield series.

== Show Format ==
The show usually begins with Carlton discussing the major news topics and current events for the day and setting an agenda for discussion. Each show from Tuesday to Wednesday typically revolves around two or three topics. Fridays are open to any topic (see below) that a listener calls in about, SMS's, or emails to the show.

The show also included a number of regular and semi-regular segments including Brush with Fame, Get It off Your Chest and Spoony's War on Error. Carlton also proclaimed himself a dreamweaver and has consequently incorporated this into his show as an occasional late night segment. Also, sometimes he will do a rant on matters that bug him, such as his war against business ties.

=== Friday Monster Free-for-All ===
Every Friday night, Carlton turned the show over to his listeners to talk about whatever topic they like. Although he began the show by briefly talking about the day's major news headlines, listeners are free to call in and talk about anything of their interest or concern (he stated that this was in response to the media criticism that he had complete control over the subject matter of the show on 22 May 2007).

It was common for topics to include anything from current events to previous topics of discussion or something going on in a caller's personal life. Callers will often raise topics near the beginning of the program which are then sometimes continued by other callers wishing to give their opinions on the matter. Carlton stresses that this was one of the most "dangerous things in talkback radio", as he hands the show completely over the listeners. It was consequently a favourite with listeners as they get to voice their opinions and views on the air.

Occasionally on other days of the week free for alls may occur. On every day during the final week of broadcast a free for all happens every night.

=== Brush with Fame ===
Brush with Fame was an occasional segment on a Tuesday night for callers to talk about their encounters with celebrities. Callers are encouraged to talk about who they met, how and where they met them, and what they were like when they met; were they nice to them, or did they give them "the brush"... hence the name of the segment. This segment, however, was not always on Tuesday night due to other topics.

=== Spoony's Bulging Sack ===
In this segment, Carlton reads and replies to off-topic emails and emails regarding previous topics that are received throughout the week.

=== Get It off Your Chest ===
Get It off Your Chest was an occasional segment that allows callers to call in and "confess their sins". Carlton describes the segment as "radio's most dangerous confessional". The confessions vary from caller to caller, and can vary in seriousness. Most calls are typically for minor acts, such as petty thefts (or borrowing without returning) or lies.

In one instance, a caller confessed to an elaborate lie to an ex-boyfriend about giving birth to a child of his (which was actually miscarried) and subsequently putting the child up for adoption. The caller admitted to faking documentation (such as borrowing a friend's ultrasounds and photos) and that she never intends to confess the truth to him, despite losing significant sleep over it.

=== Special guests ===
Carlton occasionally has guests on his show. Notable guests include porn star Belladonna, Ziggy Switkowski, "Weird Al" Yankovic, 2007 Australian of the Year Dr Tim Flannery, celebrity scientist Dr. Karl Kruszelnicki, Hunters & Collectors frontman, Mark Seymour and Henry Rollins.

=== Spoony Tune ===
Every night towards the end of the show, Carlton was allowed to play a song from his own personal music collection. This was called the Spoony Tune. Carlton plays songs from many genres, many of the songs are tracks you would not normally hear on Triple M or on commercial radio in Australia at all.

=== Editorials ===
On Fridays a set of short editorials recorded by Carlton (approx. one minute each) are played throughout the day, giving his final opinion of the week's major topics. He did not release any new editorials from the beginning of 2008 to the cancellation of the show.

== Phased-out segments ==
Over the history of the radio program, several segments have been phased out.

=== 30 Second Soap Box ===
This segment usually happened on a Monday night. The basis for this segment was to give the listeners 30 seconds to speak about anything without being interrupted by Carlton. However, after the 30 seconds are over, the listener was automatically cut off, regardless of their topic discussed. This segment came about after criticism that he "cuts and drones out listeners". As the listener speak without being interrupted, this makes it more dangerous than the "Free-For-All" so Carlton has set a few rules.

He can cut your call if you:

- Break the Law
- Break the Broadcasting Act
- Advertise.

=== Cruel Quiz ===
The first Cruel Quiz was held on Monday, 2006-06-26 and had become a regular segment, which ran most nights. This quiz contained five general knowledge questions. At the beginning, 10 callers are lined up ready to play. Each caller was allowed five seconds to answer each question (known as the five-second fudge factor). The short time limit was designed to reduce the ability of a caller to quickly Google the answer.

If a caller answered a question correctly, they moved on to the next question. If not, Carlton moved onto the next caller. The caller to answer the fifth and final question correctly won a limited edition Spoonman singlet, whose value peaked at $105 on eBay. If a caller answered all five questions correctly, they also won a bonus pack of CDs and DVDs—this first happened on 13 February 2007.

The last Cruel Quiz was on 13 December 2007..

=== Dreamweaver ===
Usually on a Wednesday night, Carlton will open up the phones and take calls from people who have recurring dreams, but are unable to work out what they mean. His job as the "dreamweaver" was to work out what the dreams mean, and suggest a way for the person to remove the dream or change the dream, when it occurs again.

=== Spoony's War on Error ===
The War on Error was dedicated to exposing errors spotted by listeners, anywhere they happen to see them. Sometimes, this will even include errors made by Carlton himself. This segment was usually run on Wednesday nights, although Carlton will occasionally mention minor errors throughout the week.

== The ATFS Podcast ==
ATFS, or After the Forking Show was a podcast only segment, introduced in 2008. It contained explicit content and language, so much that it cannot be broadcast over the airwaves, as it would be in breach of the broadcasting act. These rules (in Australia) do not apply to podcasts. Even still, some of the first podcast was censored out. In a special ATFS podcast, Garfield and Odie remarked that there would be no more censorship in future podcasts, confirmed by using the word cunt. The topics raised are mostly things on the news and stuff going on in the guys lives, and the podcast was basically a "rant" (talk) between Carlton, Garfield and the little heard Odie.

On 7 April 2009, Odie, the former phone operator of the Spoonman Show reported that ATFS would return, if enough fan support resulted. The ATFS enjoyed a partial return with 2 Random Raves, including both Garfield and Bryan Madigan (Odie), giving fans the hope of a continued return. However, with Bryan Madigan leaving the MMM in early 2010, it seemingly putting to rest any further hope of a return.

== Controversies ==
The show was promoted as a "controversial talk show", and Carlton freely admits that he speaks his mind and raises his opinions with much vigour. There have been occasions where his comments have created some controversy from the media and some of the show's listeners. Prominent comments of this nature are the discussion that was created on the suicide attempt of the then leader of the NSW opposition, and Spoonman's opinions expressed on the day of Steve Irwin's death.

=== August 2005 – John Brogden ===
In August 2005, he was criticised after discussing the suicide attempt of the then-leader of the NSW Opposition, John Brogden, describing the method, wrist-cutting, as 'half-arsed'.

=== September 2006 – Steve Irwin ===
In September 2006, on the evening after Steve Irwin's death, he raised issues concerning Irwin's treatment of animals, criticising Irwin for regularly harassing and provoking them in his documentaries. He did however merit his contribution to animal and habitat conservation at a species level. The following day, he apologised for "putting a narrow focus" on Irwin's Death and accepting that he was incorrect in believing that Steve Irwin was not seen by many people as someone of respect or celebrity in Australia, claiming that "plenty of Aussies thought he was just a wanker". He came to the conclusion that he was incorrect for saying these comments the following day after he received hundreds of emails and SMSes in fact showing the opposite ideals. He allowed callers to speak their mind about Irwin on this second night.

=== November 2007 – Cancellation in Adelaide ===
On 16 November 2007, thirty minutes before the show concluded, The Spoonman announced that the show would no longer be broadcast in Adelaide, South Australia. Previously, the show was broadcast there on 104.7FM the reason given by the station for the change was new station programming. The Spoonman later confirmed that the show would only cease broadcasting in South Australia, and would return in 2008 in 3 capital cities.

Common belief is that a timeslot reshuffle was the likely culprit of the show's cancellation in South Australia, as due to time zone differences, the show would have begun broadcasting there at 7:30PM. The material discussed on the show would have been unsuitable for that timeslot according to Australian radio broadcast laws.

=== August 2008 – Missing Fan ===
William of Melbourne had been picked as the show's biggest fan in June 2007. He was reported as a missing person on 25 August, 2008. He had left his house at 2:30 pm Monday, and It was believed he was going to the local park to kick a football, and check his savings account at an ATM in the northern suburbs of Melbourne. The station announced on the 28 August show that William has been found alive and well, after walking into a police station in the morning.

== Nationwide Cancellation of Show ==
On 26 November 2008, Spoonman announced his retirement from presenting "Late Night with the Spoonman" on Triple M. Triple M executives stated that the axing of the show was a result of a re-direction of resources to breakfast shows and Carlton's slot would no longer receive resources. The new direction of Sydney's Triple M may have been a factor in the decision to cancel the show also.

== 2009 – Present, Return to MMM ==
He was reading the weekday news from 10am-3pm (from 2009 to 2010) on Triple M Sydney and also doing editorials on the hour which are available for download from the Triple M website and iTunes.

From 2009 to 2010, Spoonman was a regular contributor on Ugly Phil's night show. On 4 October 2012 Spoonman announced on Twitter that his contract with Triple M would not be renewed for 2013.

In November 2019, Triple M announced the return of The Spoonman show.
