= Triple M Sydney =

Radio station in Sydney

Triple M Sydney (2MMM)
- Sydney, New South Wales; Australia
- Broadcast area: Sydney
- Frequencies: 104.9 MHz FM, DAB+
- Branding: 104.9 Triple M

Programming
- Format: Active rock
- Affiliations: Triple M

Ownership
- Owner: Southern Cross Austereo
- Sister stations: 2Day FM

History
- First air date: 12 July 1980

Technical information
- ERP: 150,000 watts
- HAAT: 224 metres (735 feet)
- Transmitter coordinates: 33°48′20″S 151°10′51″E

Links
- Website: Official website

Triple M Sydney (callsign 2MMM) is a radio station broadcasting in Sydney, Australia. Triple M Sydney is part of Southern Cross Austereo's Triple M network and broadcasts on the 104.9 MHz frequency.

== History ==
=== The Early Days ===
Triple M commenced broadcasting on 2 August 1980. Together with then rival station 2Day FM, it was one of the first two commercial FM radio stations in Sydney. The Government-owned Triple J began broadcasting on the FM band just one day earlier.

The station has always been primarily a rock music station. In the 80's, Triple M was one of the highest-rating radio stations in Sydney, spearheaded by its breakfast show presented by Doug Mulray and featuring the writing of and occasional appearances by Andrew Denton. From 1988 until the early nineties, Club Veg with Mal Lees and Vic Davies hosted the Night show before moving to Perth to host the breakfast show at 96FM/Triple M.

For all of this period and into the 1990s, Triple M's promotional campaign featured the character "Dr Dan", a guitar-playing satyr with wings, and a theme song that was an extended reworking of the Mike Batt track "Introduction (The Journey of a Fool)", from his 1979 album Tarot Suite.

=== 1990s to Early 2000s ===
After the Departure of Doug Mulray at breakfast, 2MMM tried a variety of breakfast show hosts, including Rob Duckworth and Sammy Power, and the Richard Stubbs Breakfast Show (broadcast from 3MMM in Melbourne). It was not until the late 1990s when Andrew Denton, a previous contributor to Mulray's program took the chair and became the host of Triple M's breakfast slot, with Amanda Keller joining him as a co-host, that 2MMM once again enjoyed ratings success.

Club Veg with Mal Lees and Vic Davies also returned in 1998 and enjoyed instant ratings success in their morning slot of 9:00am–12 midday before being moved to the Drive shift 4:00pm–7:00pm.

This was also the time that Keller would work with Brendan "Jonesy" Jones who was doing afternoons at the time. Denton called in unwell one day Jones was called in to fill in with Keller, five years later they are working at WSFM.

FM Talk was tinkered with via Talkback Host and journalist Brian Carlton, using the on air name of The Spoonman, derived from the Soundgarden song "Spoonman". This show got axed at the end of the 1990s.

Andrew Denton left the M's in the early 2000s, and many breakfast teams were tried out, with the likes of Peter Berner, Mikey Robins, and a return of Amanda Keller also during this period.

The Triple M Freq Club was discontinued nationally during 2004.

=== 2006–2008 ===
A new breakfast program, The Cage emerged on the Triple M network, which included talents such as James Brayshaw, Peter Berner, Fitzy, Brigitte Duclos, these hosts being in various Triple M studios across the network. This went on in Sydney until the end of 2006, with the popular drive show The Shebang taking up the breakfast slot in 2007, to a low degree of success. Brian Carlton Returned in 2005, once again doing nights, using The Spoonman name. In 2007, night show host Paul Murray was added to the Shebang breakfast team in the hope of increasing ratings, to no avail. The show abruptly ended in November 2008. The decision to axe The Shebang breakfast program and Marty Sheargold taking leave from the show, led to Triple M's lowest ratings ever, slipping behind competitor Vega for the first time and leaving the former top-rating station last in the commercial radio station ratings.

The Triple M Street Team (aka Street Freq or Rock patrols) were discontinued from visiting locations (such as parks and reserves) regularly – during mid 2006, to focus on a different brand. Though at present, there are Triple M Street Team locations on an occasional basis - visiting businesses only. .

During mid 2006, Triple M introduced an interactive survey encouraging Triple M listeners to have a say in the music they play through the Triple M Music Jury.

In October 2008, the station had changed the format temporarily (Awesome '80s) to play only 1980s music and use the old promos, news and traffic themes and the old station name Triple M FM 105.

The Spoonman Show and drive team Wil and Lehmo were also axed at the end of 2008. Morning DJ Anthony Maroon (who moved to Vega 95.3) was removed from the on-air DJs, along with Rob Duckworth who was in the afternoon slot. The re-branding of Vega saw the return of Maroon to Triple M on-air crew.

=== December 2008 – present ===
After the "Awesome 80s" format had wrapped up on 30 November 2008, "The All New Triple M" was launched, replacing the old slogans of "Triple M Rocks" and "Best of the Old Stuff, Best of the New Stuff" with "Music That Rocks". This launch came with a demographic shift, moving away from the "working class" mid 30s to 40s to a younger, 25–39 key demographic, targeting younger listeners.

A new Breakfast Team was launched, with Ugly Phil and Sami Lukis, along with new drive programs, Roy & HG (Mondays and Fridays), and Tuesday to Thursdays drive slot being hosted by ex Shebang anchor Byron Cooke, called Live Line. The Peter Berner Experiment returned from Tues to Thursdays at 6 pm. The Paul Murray Night Show returned, with the name "The All New Paul Murray Show", with the co host Rachel Corbett, playing nothing but recent music, with a slant towards a youth audience.

Artists which feature prominently on Triple M include Nickelback, Powderfinger, Kevin Rudolf, Silverchair, Coldplay, The Fray, Snow Patrol, Kings of Leon, Faker, AC/DC, Cold Chisel and Bon Jovi amongst others.

During May 2009, Triple M introduced "The Music That Made Triple M Famous", playing music from the eras of the 1970s and 1980s.

During June 2009, Phil O'Neil and Sami Lukis had been axed from the breakfast slot just over six months since they started broadcasting in December 2008. Paul Murray and Rachel Corbett continued in the breakfast slot until mid-August when the new breakfast show would commence broadcasting. Paul & Rach moved to the Tuesday-Thursday drivetime slot from 8 September 2009.

As of 17 August 2009, Gus Worland, Stuart MacGill and Mark Geyer were named the hosts of the new Triple M's breakfast show called The Grill Team. They were joined by anchor Byron Cooke, news reader Sami Lukis and contributor Rachel Corbett.

On 3 September, The Peter Berner Experiment aired its final episode as Berner has finished up with the station for a possible move to the Nine Network.

On 23 November 2009, Triple M's slogan changed to "Sydney's Best Rock".

On 2 August 2010, Triple M turned 30 and asked slash to remake the Dr Dan Theme to a 2010 format.

Byron Cooke left The Grill Team at the end of 2010 and moved to the Today Network to anchor Fifi and Jules. He was replaced by former Hot30 Countdown host Chris Page. Sami Lukis also left Triple M at the end of 2010, replaced by Rachel Corbett in the breakfast newsreader role.

On 28 March 2011 Matthew Johns brother of Andrew Johns joined The Grill Team, while Brian "Spoonman" Carlton took over the newsreader role and Rachel Corbett became a regular contributor.

On 28 September 2011, it was announced that Merrick Watts will join Triple M during drive in 2012. He was joined by Rachel Corbett and Julian Schiller as part of the Merrick and the Highway Patrol drive show. It was cancelled at the end of 2013.

On January 20, 2014, Triple M's new national drive show "The One Percenters" premiered, hosted by ex-Fox FM Breakfast host Matt Tilley and journalist/Studio 10 host Joe Hildebrand. The station changed its slogan to "Sydney's Modern Rock" around this time, with a playlist focussed on music released since 1990.

On 28 November 2024, Triple M announced former National Rugby League player and television presenter Beau Ryan would be set to host the radio station's morning slot from January 2025, alongside presenter Natarsha Belling and former Wests Tigers captain, Aaron Woods.

== Current On Air Schedule ==
Weekday shows:

5:30am–9:00am: Beau Ryan Cat Lynch and Aaron Woods in the Morning

9:00am–12:00pm: Mornings With Dangerous Dave Williams

12:00pm–2:00pm: Afternoons With Al Dobie

2:00pm—4:00pm Lu & Jarch

4:00pm-6:00pm the rush hour nsw

6:00pm–7:00pm: Triple M NRL Daily

7:00pm–10:00pm: Triple M Nights with Dave Gleeson

10:00pm–12 midnight: Homegrown With Matty O

Weekend shows:

Dead Set Legends Saturdays: 10:00am–12 midday

Triple M NRL: Saturday Scrum: 12 midday–6:00pm

Almost acoustic Sundays: 6:00am–10:00am

Triple M NRL: Sunday Sin Bin 12 midday–6:00pm

Fill in announcer: 12 midday–6:00pm Saturday & Sunday (Off Season)

== News ==
- Loren Howarth (breakfast)
- Sacha Barbour Gatt
- Micaela Savage
- Amy Goggins
- Jeff Tyler

== Digital Radio ==
Triple M is simulcast on Digital Radio in Sydney.

Triple M launched High Voltage Radio, a "pop up" Digital Radio station that exclusively plays AC/DC for the duration of the band's 2010 tour of Australia. High Voltage stopped being on air on 15 March 2010.

On 25 November 2013, Triple M Classic Rock Digital radio station was launched. The station format is exclusively classic rock, with no announcer talkback.
