= Mike Christian =

Australian radio presenter

Michael Christian
- Born: Michael Christian
- Occupation: Radio personality
- Years active: 2006–present

Michael Christian is an Australian radio presenter.

Christian is best known for his work with Southern Cross Austereo. With Austereo, he worked for their Fox FM and 2Day FM stations. At 2Day FM, along with his co-host Mel Greig, he made a prank call to the hospital caring for Catherine, Duchess of Cambridge that led to the suicide of one of the nurses in December 2012. In February 2025, after working with the network for over 20 years, Christian was made redundant by Southern Cross Austereo. As of December 2025, Christian is a radio announcer on KIIS 1065.

== Career ==
=== Early career ===
In February 2006, Christian started his radio career at Sea FM Central Coast, after completing a Graduate Diploma in Commercial Radio Broadcasting at the Australian Film, Television and Radio School. He later moved on to become a morning announcer at 92.9 Perth.

=== Southern Cross Austereo ===
On 5 October 2009, Christian started a position as the afternoon's announcer at Austereo's Fox FM in Melbourne, Victoria before moving to mornings. He moved to Sydney's 2Day FM in December 2012 to host the Hot30 Countdown with Mel Greig, a nationally syndicated program.

=== Royal prank ===
On 4th December 2012, Christian and his 2Day FM radio co-host, Mel Greig, made a radio prank call to the hospital that was caring for Catherine, Duchess of Cambridge, during her first pregnancy. The duo tricked the hospital into releasing private medical information on the Duchess by using "ridiculous comedy accents" to mimic Queen Elizabeth II and the Prince of Wales in an attempt to talk with the Duchess.

Two days later Jacintha Saldanha, one of the nurses who was tricked by the pair, was found dead in a suspected suicide.

Both Christian and Greig were seen on their Twitter accounts boasting about the prank a day earlier, calling it "the easiest prank call ever made." They were both suspended from broadcasting following the death. In an interview on the Nine Network's A Current Affair program, Christian said that "We are shattered, heartbroken and our deepest sympathy goes to the family, friends and all those people affected. Mel and myself are incredibly sorry for the situation and what's happened."

On 27 January 2013, 2Day FM's parent company announced on its Facebook page that the Hot 30 show responsible for the prank would not be returning.

On Sunday 28 April 2013 The Sunday Times newspaper in the United Kingdom reported Saldanha had authored a suicide note blaming Christian and Greig. She also asked that they be made responsible for her mortgage.

In July 2025, Christian broke his silence on the matter saying he "was, and remains, profoundly affected" by the incident. He launched a lawsuit against his employers following his redundancy in early 2025 and his legal team stated that Michael had "consistently raised complaints and inquiries in relation to the incident and its continuing impact on his mental health, safety, reputation, and career progression" and was told the network would "ensure he had a successful career by rebuilding his personal and professional brand". Christian alleged that Southern Cross Austereo failed to do so and also made him and his co-host Mel Greig "convenient fall guys and scapegoats" as they "did not immediately take public accountability".

=== Return to radio ===
Christian returned to the Melbourne Fox FM morning program on 11 February 2013, and his move there created controversy.

In June 2013, Southern Cross Austereo awarded Christian the Next Top Jock award. This decision was criticised in the Australian media. Australian National Communications Minister Stephen Conroy told a Melbourne radio station "I think there’s a bit of bad taste involved there. There were some very serious consequences of what was a prank and to be seen to be rewarding people so soon after such an event, I think, is just in bad taste."

In 2015, Christian returned to 2Day FM as an announcer.

After departing Austereo, Christian joined ARN and the KIIS Network as a casual radio host, and the co-host of the Sunday Night show, Saucy Secrets with Jana Hocking.

=== Departure from Austereo and lawsuit ===
On 28 February 2025, while at 2Day FM, he was made redundant by the networker Southern Cross Austereo ending his 20+ year tenure with the company. Five months later, Christian launched a lawsuit against Southern Cross Austereo claiming their redundancy process was "not genuine". The lawsuit also alleged contraventions of the Fair Work Act and whistleblower protections.
