= Mel Greig =

Australian journalist, radio and television personality

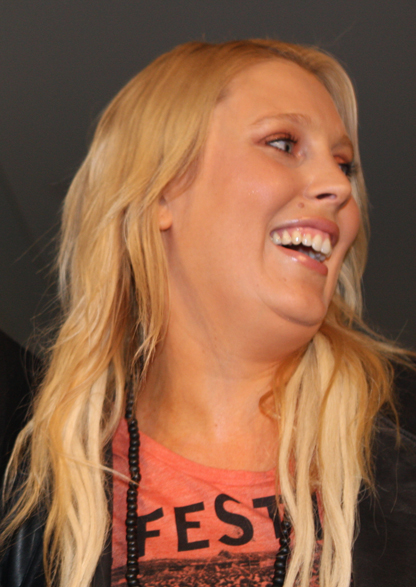
- Greig in 2012
- Born: 13 March 1982 (age 44); Beaudesert, Queensland, Australia
- Occupations: Radio and television personality
- Website: MelGreig.com.au

Mel Greig (born 13 March 1982) is an Australian radio presenter.

She is arguably best known for her brief tenure as co-host of the Hot30 Countdown on 2Day FM, which was broadcast nationally on the Southern Cross Austereo's Today Network until it was officially axed in January 2013 following the suicide of Jacintha Saldanha.

== Career ==
In 2011, Greig competed on the first season of The Amazing Race Australia with her sister Alana. In 2012, she began co-hosting the Hot30 Countdown on 2Day FM with Matty Acton, and then Mike Christian.

In December 2012, she and Christian posed as Queen Elizabeth II and Prince Charles to make a prank call to the hospital where Catherine Middleton was convalescing. It backfired, leading to the suicide of Jacintha Saldanha and the axing of the radio program.

In 2015, Greig was a contestant on the fourth season of The Celebrity Apprentice Australia. In January 2016, she returned to radio, co-hosting on The Hot Breakfast on 96.5 Wave FM with Travis Winks.

In 2018, Greig left Wave FM and moved back to Sydney..

Greig writes an online dating column for Yahoo Be and has contributed articles to Mamamia, an Australian women's website.

Greig has endometriosis and is an ambassador for Endometriosis Australia.

=== Royal prank ===
In December 2012, Greig and Christian broadcast a prank call they had made to King Edward VII Hospital, where Catherine, Duchess of Cambridge was convalescing, posing as the Queen and Prince Charles. It later transpired that one of the nurses who answered the call, Jacintha Saldanha, committed suicide as a result of the prank and the media attention it generated. Greig made a statement at the inquest, while 2Day FM has, to date, rejected any blame for Saldanha's death.

The Hot30 Countdown was taken off the air on 12 December. It was officially axed the following month. In an interview with ITV's This Morning program in 2019, Greig said that she was the victim of a "witch hunt".
