= Suicide of Jacintha Saldanha =

Hanging of Indian nurse after being deceived

- Saldanha in a family photograph
- Date: 7 December 2012
- Location: Charterhouse Annexe, King Edward VII's Hospital Sister Agnes, Westminster, Greater London
- Cause: Suicide
- Burial: 17 December 2012, Shirva, Karnataka, India
- Inquest: Preliminary held 13 December 2012, full 11 & 12 September 2014
- Convictions: None

Jacintha Saldanha (24 March 1966 – 7 December 2012) was an Indian nurse who worked at King Edward VII's Hospital in the City of Westminster, London. On 7 December 2012, she was found dead by suicide, three days after falling for a prank phone call as part of a radio stunt. In the prank call, the hosts of the Australian radio programme Hot30 Countdown, broadcast on the Southern Cross Austereo-owned station 2Day FM in Sydney, called Saldanha's hospital and impersonated Queen Elizabeth II and the then-Prince of Wales enquiring about the health of Catherine, Duchess of Cambridge, who was a patient there at the time. Saldanha fell for the hoax and transferred the call to the nurse looking after the Duchess.

Saldanha's suicide led to public outrage, including in Saldanha's home country, against those responsible for perpetrating and broadcasting the prank. Despite numerous calls for legal action, no charges were laid.

== Background of Saldanha ==
Saldanha was 46 years old at the time of her death. She was born in Shirva, India, and had lived in the Sultanate of Oman for several years, before moving to England around 2002. In December 2012, she was staying in nurse's quarters at her London workplace, for the sake of convenience, while her family (husband, 16-year-old son, and 14-year-old daughter) lived in Bristol.

The family initially reported to the press that Saldanha did not have any history of mental illness or depression. However, multiple news sources later revealed that this was not Saldanha's first attempt at suicide, noting she had attempted suicide on two previous occasions and was taking antidepressant medication.

== Prank call ==
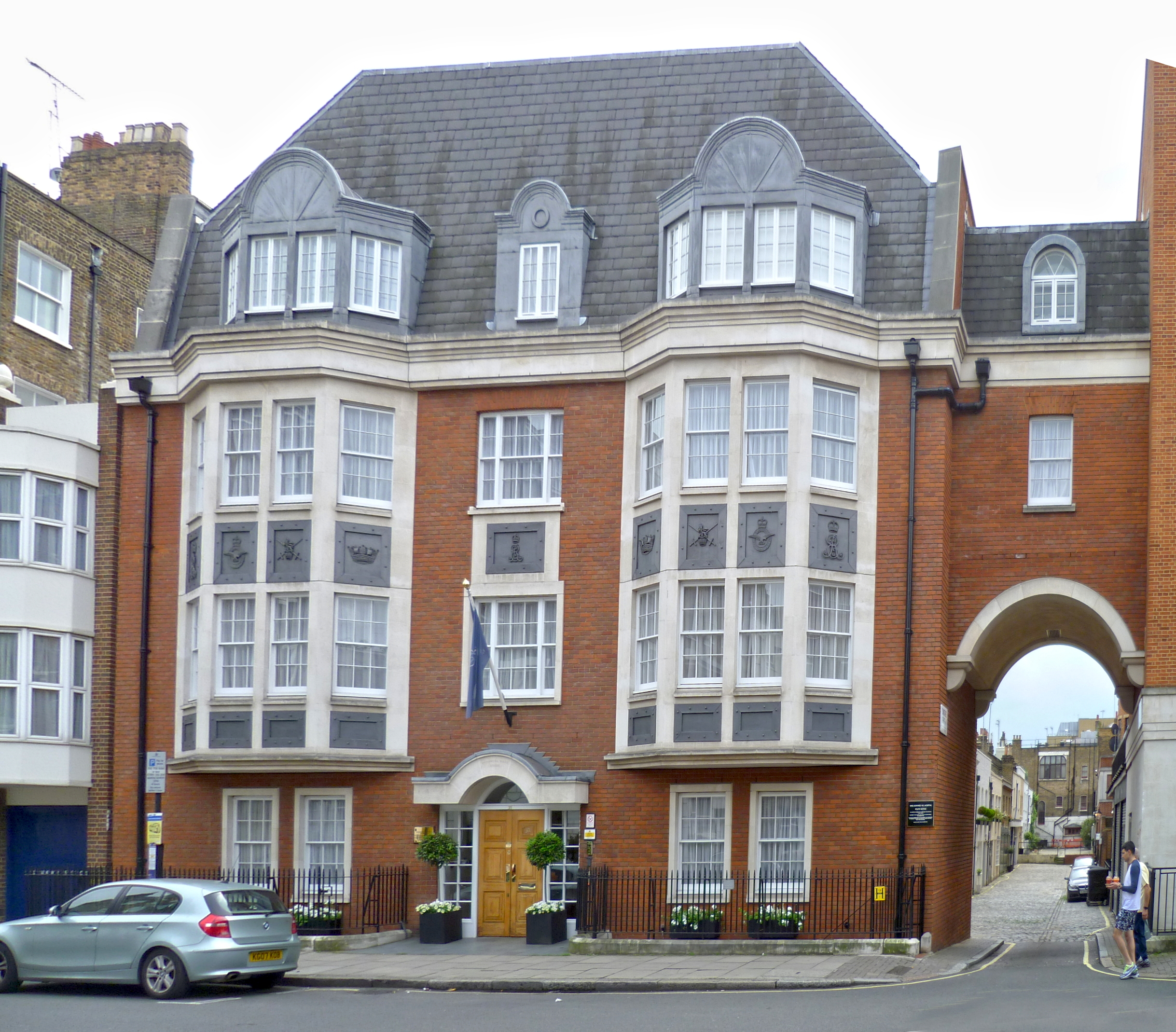
Buildings of the King Edward VII's Hospital in Devonshire Street, London

On 2 December 2012, St James's Palace announced that Catherine, Duchess of Cambridge, was pregnant. On 4 December, at about 5:30 am London time (GMT) or 4:30 pm Sydney time (AEDT), the hosts of the Hot30 Countdown radio programme, Mel Greig and Mike Christian, called the hospital and spoke to the main nurse, Saldanha. Impersonating Elizabeth II, Greig said: "Oh hello there. Could I please speak to Kate please, my granddaughter." Saldanha responded, "Oh yes. Hold on ma'am," and transferred the call to the Duchess's nurse, who spent approximately two minutes speaking with Greig as well as Christian, the latter impersonating the then-Prince of Wales. The hosts used what were later described as "ridiculous comedy accents".

The stunt was broadcast on 5 December, after it had been cleared by the radio station's lawyers. When hospital chief executive John Lofthouse learned of the prank call, he condemned it as an act of "journalistic trickery" that no nurse should have to deal with. The CEO of Southern Cross Austereo, Rhys Holleran, later claimed that station officials had made at least five attempts to contact the two nurses in the recording prior to greenlighting the call for broadcast – with Sydney University law professor Barbara McDonald noting that his comments showed the station already understood they needed to "[get] consent (to air the interview) and they failed to".

On 6 December, the radio station issued a brief apology for "any inconvenience caused" by their actions, although Christian continued to promote "the royal prank" on Twitter. Neither Saldanha nor the other nurse was disciplined or suspended by the hospital; St. James's Palace also indicated that they did not blame the nurses for their part in the incident.

== Death ==
On the morning of 7 December 2012, Saldanha was found dead by security and other staff in her nurse's quarters at the hospital. She had died by suicide, and also had injuries.

It was reported that Saldanha had left three handwritten notes, one of which blamed the radio stunt for her death. Another note discussed her wishes for funeral arrangements, while the third was directed at her employer, criticising their handling of events that followed the prank call.

=== Southern Cross Austereo ===
Following news of Saldanha's suicide, Austereo CEO Rhys Holleran said that Greig and Christian were both "deeply shocked" and would not return to their radio show until further notice. A day later, as advertisers boycotted or threatened to boycott the station, 2Day FM suspended all advertising indefinitely. On 10 December, Greig and Christian gave their first interviews since Saldanha's death, telling Nine Network's A Current Affair and Seven Network's Today Tonight that they were still "badly shaken" over the tragedy.

Advertising on 2Day FM resumed from 13 December, with Austereo announcing that it would donate the remainder of station advertising proceeds for 2012—a minimum of A$500,000 (£320,000)—to a memorial fund to benefit Saldanha's family. Austereo also cancelled its annual Christmas party for employees in Sydney and donated the funds for the party to the non-profit organisations Beyond Blue and Lifeline.

On 27 January 2013, Austereo announced that Hot30 Countdown was cancelled. Christian returned to work in February and won Austereo's "Top Jock" award in June 2013 for his work on Fox FM in Melbourne, while Greig remained off-air. Greig later sued Austereo for failure to provide a safe workplace; the lawsuit was settled in December 2013. As part of the settlement, Austereo made a public statement that Greig was not responsible for the decision to air the hoax call and had suggested that it be edited before broadcast. Greig found work in advertising after leaving Austereo, but in 2016 returned to radio work in Wollongong, south of Sydney. In March 2018, Greig revealed that she became the target of online bullies following the prank and became a contributor for anti-bullying campaigns.

=== In India ===
The burial function for Saldanha was held on 17 December 2012 in the town of Shirva in Karnataka, India. More than 1,000 people attended the mass and burial ceremony, including a minister of Karnataka state, a former Central Minister and other state functionaries. Several Karnataka dignitaries also visited Saldanha's mother, who lives in Mangalore with Saldanha's siblings.

Dozens of students staged a demonstration in front of the British High Commission in New Delhi, carrying banners demanding "Justice for Jacintha". The Chief Minister of Karnataka expressed concern over the back-to-back deaths of Saldanha and Savita Halappanavar, both women of Karnataka origin working abroad, and wrote letters to the Indian prime minister urging him to take steps to ensure the safety of Indian origin people abroad. RJ Balaji, based in Chennai, Tamil Nadu, discontinued his radio show Cross Talk—where he made prank calls to unsuspecting victims—in response to Saldanha's death.

=== Legal action ===
As part of their investigation into the death, the Metropolitan Police Service in London contacted the New South Wales Police Force in Sydney. However, on 28 December 2012, the New South Wales deputy police commissioner said that there had been no formal request from UK police to interview Greig and Christian, and that it seemed "unlikely any charges will be laid." British prosecutors confirmed in February 2013 that they would not be pressing charges against the presenters; although Greig and Christian may have committed offences under Britain's Data Protection Act 1998 and Malicious Communications Act 1988, prosecution was deemed to "not be in the public interest" because it would not be possible to extradite the Australians and because "however misguided, the telephone call was intended as a harmless prank".

On 13 December 2012, Australian media watchdog Australian Communications and Media Authority (ACMA) launched an inquiry to assess whether the radio station had breached the conditions of their broadcasting licence. In September 2013, it was reported that ACMA had prepared a confidential preliminary report that found 2Day FM had acted illegally by broadcasting the hoax phone call without consent. Southern Cross Austereo was seeking to block the report's release, arguing that ACMA did not have standing to make a criminal finding. A Federal Court judge sided with ACMA in November 2013, but was reversed by a decision of the full bench of the Federal Court in March 2014. ACMA subsequently appealed to the High Court, which agreed in August 2014 to hear the case. On 4 March 2015 the High Court upheld the earlier decision of the Federal Court, ruling that the ACMA could validly exercise non-jurisdictional administrative power to make a determination in respect of whether the relevant conduct was unlawful.

In its report, which was released on 22 April 2015, ACMA found that 2Day FM had breached the Australian commercial radio code of conduct by broadcasting a statement of an identifiable person without her consent and that they had treated her in a highly demeaning or highly exploitative manner. ACMA applied a third licence condition to 2Day FM as a sanction which consisted of staff ethics training and a three-hour broadcast raising awareness of bullying, depression and anxiety.
