= Sami Lukis =

Australian television and radio personality

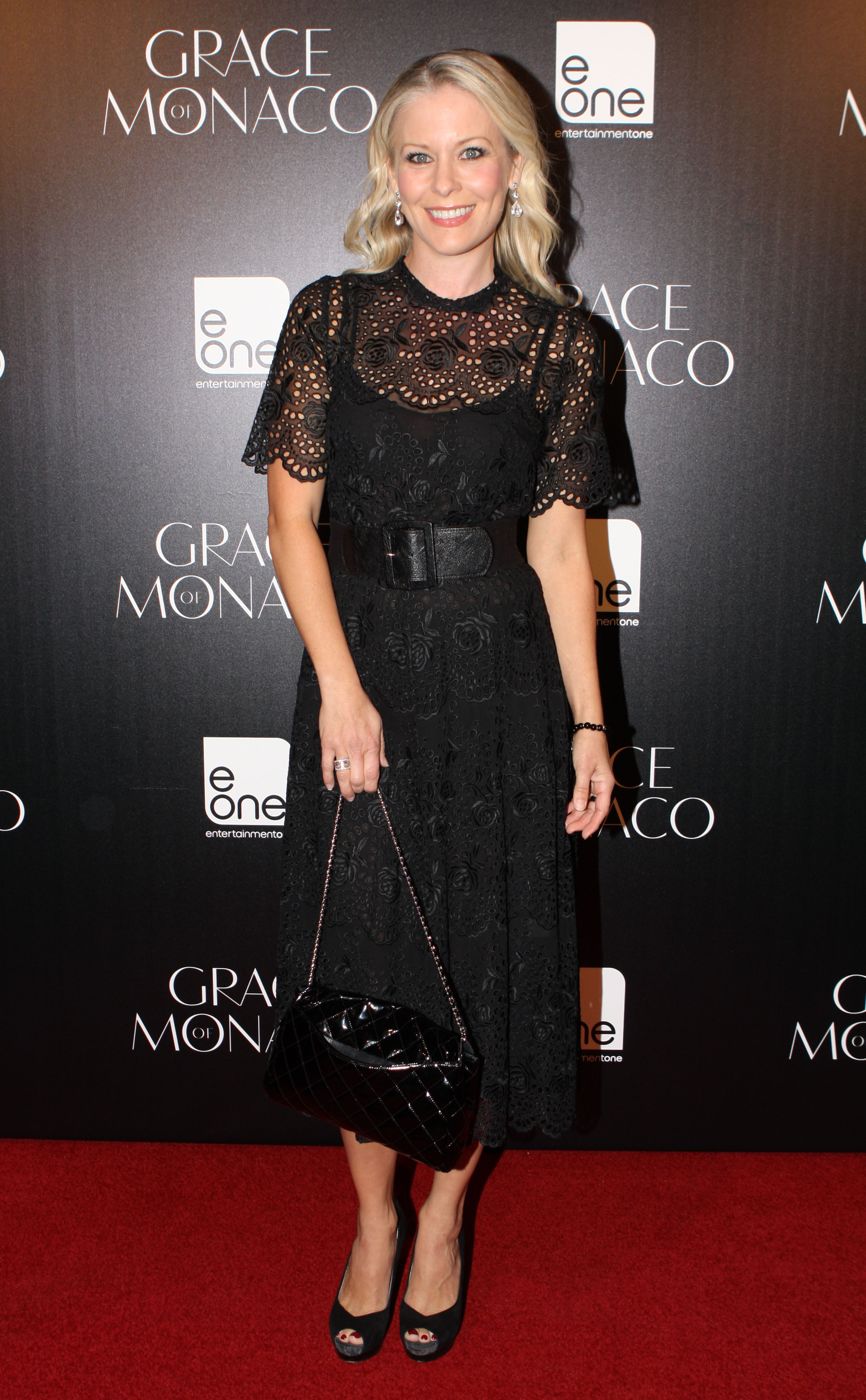
Lukis at the Australian premiere of Grace of Monaco, 2014.

Sami Lukis is an Australian television and radio personality.

Lukis has appeared on the Nine Network as weather presenter on Today, and for Network Ten on the children's educational program Totally Wild. She also worked in radio as a breakfast news reader and presenter for Nova 96.9 on the Merrick and Rosso show, as well as a guest presenter of the Seven Network program The Morning Show with Larry Emdur

== Early life ==
Before starting her media career, Lukis graduated from Queensland University of Technology with a Bachelor of Business Communication, majoring in Film and Television with a minor in Journalism. Lukis was awarded the Federation of Radio Broadcasters Prize for the most outstanding student in broadcast journalism.

== Career ==
In August 2009, Lukis was appointed newsreader for the Grill Team breakfast radio program airing on Triple M Sydney, though from December 2010 Lukis parted ways from Triple M and was replaced by Rachel Corbett as being the breakfast newsreader from January 2011.

In November 2011, Lukis appeared on Ant and Becks' show on Mix FM, filling in for Becks. In April 2012, Anthony Toohey (aka Becks) left Mix FM and Lukis was announced as his replacement working alongside Ant Simpson.

In 2013, Lukis was appointed co-host of Mix 106.5's breakfast show with Yumi Stynes.

In October 2014, Lukis started working for Fox Sports (Australia) as a news reader.

In 2022, Lukis began a Podcast called And Just Like That...They're Back about the Sex and the City Sequel TV Show "And Just Like That". It is a weekly podcast with a different guest each week, usually a Super fan of the Show. Lukis also hosts Sex and the City tours around New York City.

In July 2023, Lukis joined the Sunshine Coast's 91.1 Hot FM for a two-month stint while Ash Gierke is on maternity leave until September 1.

== Personal life ==
In 2018, Lukis wrote an article declaring her identification as sapiosexual.
