= Ugly Phil =

British radio presenter

- Born: Phillip Surridge; 14 March 1963 (age 63); United Kingdom
- Occupation: Radio Presenter
- Spouse: Jacqueline Last (m. 1994; div. 1999)

Phil O'Neil (born Phillip Surridge; 14 March 1963), better known as Ugly Phil, is a radio DJ and announcer. Born in the United Kingdom, he has spent the majority of his life in Australia. Before adopting the on-air name Ugly Phil, he was known as Phil O'Neil.

Throughout his career, Phil has hosted several notable shows, including the Hot30 Countdown, the Drive on Nova 969, and Evenings at Triple M multiple times. He also hosted a National Charts Show across major and regional markets called Ugly Phil's Hot Hits, which was previously and is currently known as The Hot Hits.

Additionally, Phil co-hosted the breakfast shift on Triple M Sydney with Sami Lukis.

== Radio ==
=== Australia ===
==== Hot 30 Countdown ====
In 1993–94, Phil O'Neil hosted a nightly program with his then-wife, Jackie O (aka Jackie Last), on Triple M Adelaide called Phil O'Neil's Hot 30. Later, Fox FM brought the show to Melbourne, renaming it the Hot30 Countdown. When the Austereo network decided to syndicate the show nationally, Phil and Jackie O moved to Sydney.

The show was broadcast locally on 2Day FM and across other major Australian radio markets owned by Austereo: Fox FM Melbourne, SAFM Adelaide, B105 Brisbane, NXFM Newcastle, and FM 104.7 Canberra.

The Hot 30 aired between 7-10pm Monday to Friday, often extending to 10:30 pm, much to the frustration of the next shift's host, which was loved by Phil's listeners.

Between 1998 and 2000, "Ugly Phil" was known for his prank calls to unsuspecting late-night shop attendants, often using controversial humour.

His decision to leave the Hot30 Countdown was driven by exhaustion.

Nova 969

After leaving Austereo, Phil worked briefly in the UK for Kiss 100 before returning to Australia to host the drive show on the newly launched Nova 969 in Sydney. He had the highest rating shift on Nova in this timeslot but left around the end of 2002 due to management difficulties.

Triple M

In 2003, Phil joined the Triple M network, rebranding his show as The Phil O'Neil Show. Despite including interviews, prizes, and lighthearted talkback, the experiment didn't succeed, and his contract was not renewed at the end of 2003.

He returned to Triple M Sydney in July 2008 with a night-time show titled Ugly Phil – It's A Rock Show, and later hosted the Breakfast shift with Sami Lukis, which was canceled in June 2009.

In 2014, he moved to Triple M Brisbane and later to mornings on Triple M Sydney. He hosted The Rubber Room on Triple M starting in October 2015.

In 2020, Phil appeared as a guest presenter on the afternoon show on Planet Rock.

96fm Perth

In December 2010, 96fm Perth announced that Ugly Phil would be co-hosting their breakfast program.

Star 104.5FM

In October 2012, he joined Central Coast's Star 104.5FM for the drive-time slot.

WSFM

In July 2020, Phil returned to Australia and filled in on WSFM, permanently taking over the weekday 9am-1pm slot in November 2020. He left the station in February 2025.

2GB and 4BC

In January 2025, it was announced that Ugly Phil would host Overnights from Tuesday to Friday on 2GB and 4BC.

=== United Kingdom ===
Kerrang Radio

In 2004, Phil fronted the breakfast shift on the newly licensed Kerrang Radio 105.2 in Birmingham, England, with Rachel New.

Fix Radio

In 2019, he returned to the UK to present the breakfast show on Fix Radio.

=== Awards and nominations ===
He was announced as Commercial Radio's Best Music Personality in 2000.

== Other media ==
He appeared briefly on the Network 10 produced program Ground Zero (1997–1999) co-hosted by Jade Gatt, Penne Dennison and Jackie O. He also appeared on SBS's Pizza series.

He made a cameo appearance as a radio DJ in the Australian movie Occasional Coarse Language (1998).
