= 2Day FM =

Radio station in Sydney, Australia

2Day FM (2DAY)
- Sydney, New South Wales; Australia
- Frequency: 104.1 MHz FM
- Branding: 2DAY 1041

Programming
- Language: English
- Format: Rhythmic CHR; Urban contemporary
- Affiliations: Hit Network

Ownership
- Owner: Southern Cross Austereo; (Today FM Sydney Pty Ltd)
- Sister stations: Triple M

History
- First air date: 2 August 1980

Technical information
- Licensing authority: ACMA
- Class: Commercial
- ERP: 80,000 watts
- HAAT: 224 metres (735 ft)
- Transmitter coordinates: 33°48′20″S 151°10′51″E

Links
- Public licence information: Profile
- Website: 2DayFM

2Day FM (call sign 2DAY) is a commercial FM radio station broadcasting in Sydney, New South Wales, Australia, on a frequency of 104.1 MHz, and is part of Southern Cross Austereo's Hit Network.

== History ==
=== 1980s ===
2Day FM was one of three radio stations (along with Triple M and Triple J) to be granted new FM broadcasting licenses in Sydney in 1980, and commenced broadcasting on 2 August of that year. The original owners were well known media personalities John Laws (30%), Mike Willesee (30%), Village Roadshow (30%) and Graham Kennedy (10%). The station's original programming format was focused towards easy-listening music, but shifted to more pop and rock oriented programming since the late 1980s, with the later addition of Hip-Hop and dance music to their playlists.

Originally the studios were located on the second floor of the Sovereign Inn at 220 Pacific Highway, Crows Nest. The station was sold to the Lamb Family in February 1987, who sold it again to radio group Austereo in May 1989.

=== 1990s ===
In 1995, the station's owner Austereo bought out the Triple M network from Hoyts, and following the merger of the two companies in 1996 2Day FM moved its studios and administration to Level 24, Tower 1, Westfield Bondi Junction at 520 Oxford Street, just one floor below the original home of Triple M since 1980. Austereo also took over Level 26 of the same building for its corporate departments. With the move to new premises, 2Day FM also adopted digital audio playout, incorporating the DCS audio system built by Computer Concepts, sold and supported in Australia by Techtel.

During the 1990s, 2Day FM enjoyed ratings success, especially with its breakfast program The Morning Crew (featuring well-known Australian comedian Wendy Harmer and television comedian Peter Moon), which consistently topped its segment in the Sydney radio market for years.

From 1995 to 1998, 2Day FM broadcast the highly successful Martin/Molloy drive program with Tony Martin and Mick Molloy. This program was networked to over 50 stations around Australia (from the studios of Fox FM in Melbourne, Victoria), and is considered one of Australia's most successful FM radio shows. Martin and Molloy left the Today Network in late 1998 at the top of the ratings, citing the need for a break from the pressures of radio.

Nights on 2Day FM have also been controversial. In 1997, night announcer David Rymer, host of the then Top 30 Countdown, was castigated in the media for a poorly thought-out on air stunt in which he called a top ranking Year 12 student, pretending to be from the Board of Studies. He told the girl her results were incorrect and that her marks had been adjusted. He played the segment to air after receiving verbal permission to do so from the girl's mother. However, her father was a lawyer and took legal action. The media responded and Rymer was suspended until further notice. He returned to the show a month later but was soon moved to day shifts on sister station Triple M to make way for the new networked night show Ugly Phil's Hot 30, hosted by Phil O'Neil and his then wife Jackie O. The new show was not without its controversy either, with complaints about obscenity and foul language. O'Neil resigned in 2000 and the show disintegrated, followed by their divorce in 2001. O'Neil moved to the UK to present breakfast on Kerrang! 105.2 and was replaced by the Brisbane-based Kyle Sandilands, while Jackie O remained as co-host.

=== 2000s ===
Peter Moon left the breakfast show in 2002 after infighting with Harmer became unbearable for him. He was replaced by yet another Melbourne comedian, Greg Fleet, who was poorly received by the Sydney radio listeners.

When Harmer resigned in 2003, the station replaced her with Melbourne comedian Judith Lucy. Lucy was given free rein over the new show and installed two friends, Peter Helliar and Kaz Cooke, to co-host. The show was not a success in the ratings and the station received some of the worst breakfast ratings in its history.

2Day FM continued to broadcast from Bondi Junction until October 2005, when both 2Day FM and Triple M moved into new premises at World Square, Goulburn Street, Sydney. The new premises included state of the art Klotz Digital equipment, and a street level studio. 2Day FM started 2005 with a number of changes, the most significant of which was moving the drive show team of Kyle Sandilands and Jackie O to breakfast and employing a young and unknown Craig Lowe as the host of the nightly networked show Lowie's Hot30. This was short-lived, however, after yet another on air gaffe later in the year that involved a porn star relating sexually charged experiences live to air which resulted in a breach of codes finding. Lowie was forced to resign as host of the Hot30 in November 2006. Tim Lee and co-host Carla Bignasca (Biggsy) were announced as his replacements in February 2007.

=== 2010s ===
==== Departure of Kyle Sandilands and Jackie O ====
In November 2013, breakfast team of Kyle Sandilands and Jackie O announced their departure from the station and the network. Whilst they were present at 2Day FM, the station held the number 1 FM breakfast show for 52 radio surveys in a row, and kept the station as the number 1 FM station in Sydney. Hours after the duo finished their final show at 2Day FM, rival Australian Radio Network announced the pair would be moving to a new look Mix 106.5. On 8 December, ARN announced the station would rebrand as KIIS 106.5, with Kyle Sandilands and Jackie O on breakfast.

Since the departure of Kyle Sandilands and Jackie 'O' Henderson in 2013, the station has plummeted from being the top rating commercial FM station to the bottom with an audience share of just 4 per cent – having been as low as 2.8 per cent. The replacement breakfast shows have never managed to improve ratings. The Kyle & Jackie O show on KIIS 106.5 has surged on, often competing with WSFM Jonesy and Amanda for the number 1 FM breakfast show.

In August 2014, Mel B left the then breakfast team (Merrick Watts, Jules Lund and Sophie Monk) coming to the end of her six-month contract.

In November 2014, a 30-second ad on 2Day FM in breakfast cost $850 and in drive cost $700 (with 2Day FM holding a 3.3% and 4.3% share, respectively, in these slots at the time).

==== Rebuilding Phase: Post Kyle and Jackie O ====
In January 2015, Dan and Maz took over the coveted breakfast slot. They were initially brought on board to connect with a younger audience, however struggled to make inroads against established competitors including Kyle and Jackie O on KIIS, WSFM's Jonesy & Amanda, Triple M's "The Grill Team" and Nova's Fitzy & Wippa. After struggling for the most part of the year, it was announced in October 2015, that Rove McManus would front a brand new Breakfast Show titled Rove and Sam on a three-year deal. On 9 November 2015, Rove and Sam first aired with co-host Sam Frost.

Later in 2015, Mike Christian returned to 2Day FM in a reduced position, mostly covering special events.

In July 2015, SCA managed to lure back popular comedians Hamish & Andy to the national drive slot with their syndicated radio show. The duo continued their strong run in drive since returning to 2Day FM station, with 6.8% audience share in their second survey period. The duo saw an increase of 0.3 percentage points over the period, placing them in the middle of the pack alongside WSFM and Triple M, which were also on a 6.8% audience share. They ultimately decided against renewing their contract at the end of 2017, opting instead to host a podcast version of the show from 2018 onwards.

With Rove and Sam's arrival into the 2Day FM breakfast market, Dan and Maz would return in 2016 to host a new weekend Breakfast show across the country for the network.

In January 2017, Rove and Sam moved from the breakfast show to a national nightly program on the Hit Network due to poor ratings. Em Rusciano and Harley Breen replaced Rove and Sam from 23 January 2017.

In November 2017, Southern Cross Austereo announced that Harley Breen would leave the station to focus on his stand up career. Breen would be replaced by Ed Kavalee.

In December 2017, Southern Cross Austereo announced that Grant Denyer would join Em Rusciano and Ed Kavalee. The show would be titled Em, Grant & Ed and commenced on 15 January 2018. In September 2018, Rusciano announced that she would be leaving the show to focus on her stand up career and upcoming birth of her third child. Ash London initially replaced her until it was announced in December 2018 that she will join the show permanently from January 2019.

In August 2019, Southern Cross Austereo announced that Em, Grant & Ed would finish on Friday 16 August due to taking a 'new direction'. Em, Grant & Ed had an audience share of 3.1% in the fourth survey period. The show will be replaced by a music focused show, Music for Breakfast hosted by Jamie Angel. Angel's new show will commence from Monday 19 August. Kavalee, Denyer and London will remain with Southern Cross Austereo in other capacities.

=== 2020s ===
In July 2020, Southern Cross Austereo unveiled a number of major changes to the Hit Network in metro and regional markets. It was the biggest network overhaul since the Hit brand was first introduced in 2014 and marked the beginning of a major play by SCA to reclaim their duopoly leadership position in key markets. This included a change in branding and logo once again for 2Day FM.

In November 2020, Southern Cross Austereo announced that Dave Hughes, Ed Kavalee and Erin Molan would replace Jamie Angel to host Hughesy, Ed & Erin from Monday, 18 January 2021. A highlights package of the show, Hughesy, Ed & Erin's Happy Hour aired weeknights from 6 pm to 7 pm.

In August 2024, Southern Cross Austereo announced that Hughesy, Ed & Erin had been axed with the station to take a new direction. The last show aired on Wednesday 7 August. Jimmy & Nath will host breakfast for the remainder of the year. In December 2024, Southern Cross Austereo confirmed that Jimmy & Nath will continue to host breakfast in 2025.

In January 2025, Emma Chow from Mike E & Emma was announced as a new addition to the Jimmy & Nath breakfast team, creating The Jimmy & Nath Show with Emma. On March 13 2025, 2Day FM underwent its biggest overhaul in years, launching a new sound and promise: The hits, before they hit. 2Day FM will play more new music than any other commercial radio station in Sydney, alongside a commitment to support and showcase more Australian artists. In November 2025, Jimmy Smith stepped away from The Jimmy & Nath Show with Emma to focus on his health. In December 2025, it was confirmed that Nath & Emma will continue to host breakfast in 2026.

In April 2026, 2Day FM shifted away from its “Hits Before They Hit” new‑music strategy and returned to a more familiar‑leaning Adult Contemporary/Hot AC format, a change attributed to audience behaviour, competitive pressures, and recent survey results.

== Schedule ==
Time	Show
6 am–9 am	2Day FM Breakfast with Nath & Emma
9 am–12 pm	Sean Brown (Seany B)
12 pm–3 pm	Perry Lazaris (Pez)
3 pm–6 pm	Carrie & Tommy
6 pm–7 pm	Fifi, Fev & Nick's Happy Hour
7 pm–10 pm	The Hot Hits with Nic & Loren

== Rebranding ==
Early in 2015, Southern Cross Austereo announced a re-branding of the Today Network stations in capital cities. This followed the successful revamp in September 2014 of poorly performing Adelaide station SAFM. The rebrand was to HIT 107, which also provided it with a new fresh on air sound. In January, new logos were announced for all the capital city stations (excluding Canberra) to the Hit brand.

The remaining capitals were co-branded to their previous names with the hit brand and frequency, for example "Hit 1019 the Fox", and "Hit 1041 2DAY FM". These co-brands were expected to dispense with the older identities, as demonstrated by the trademark applications lodged by SCA. A trademark on "HIT104" was intended to be the eventual identity of 2Day FM.

On 1 September 2015, both 2Day FM and Fox FM transitioned away from using the "hit" line in their on-air positioning. Hit Network Group CD Dave Cameron advised "'Hit' will always be in the on-air vernacular, being the backbone of the network format, but more of a focus would be on '2Day' and 'Fox' brands in those respective markets". The following year, 2016, SCA continued to roll out the Hit Network brand to former Today Network regional stations.

In July 2020, the SCA unveiled a number of major changes to the Hit Network in metro and regional markets. The Hit Network introduced a brand new logo, and introduced Hit’s all-new music strategy. It was a combination of big pop hits of now and familiar songs from past decades that listeners can “fall back in love with”.

In March 2025, 2Day FM overhauled its programming and launched a new tagline, "The hits, before they hit". As part of the rebrand, 2Day FM updated its sound and imaging and announced plans to play more new music than other commercial stations in Sydney while increasing support for Australian artists. Marketing for the relaunch stated that the format would "showcase the youthful and vibrant side of Sydney". However, by April 2026, 2Day FM ended its new‑music strategy and returned to an Adult Contemporary and Hot AC format, a change attributed to audience behaviour, competition, and survey results.

== News ==
- Amy Goggins (Morning/Afternoon)
- Micaela Savage (Drive)
- Sasha Barbour Gatt (Fill-In)

== Transmission ==
The station transmits from the Hampden Road Artarmon Tower, jointly owned by television stations Seven, Nine and Ten. It shares an antenna with three other stations, Triple M, Gold 101.7 and KIIS 106.5, under the collective banner of Sydney FM Facilities. The base broadcast power is 20 kilowatts and is currently delivered by a Harris ZD20 solid state transmitter.

It has an alternate transmission facility on the Broadcast Australia tower at Gore Hill, with an output power of 16 kilowatts delivered by an NEC FBN11K20E valve transmitter. Though almost 20 years old it is fed with all-digital input equipment.

== Digital radio ==
2Day FM is simulcast on digital radio in Sydney. The station launched Choose The Hits, a station only broadcast on digital radio, was launched on 1 February 2010 and closed on 26 May 2010. In addition to FM radio, listeners can also tune in through the station's smartphone application LiSTNR.

== Controversies ==
=== 2009 child rape victim incident ===
In 2009, 2Day FM were ordered to provide increased protection for children after a 14-year-old child was attached to a lie detector and pressured into discussing her sex life live on air. Kyle Sandilands, the radio show host, encouraged both the girl and her mother to discuss whether she was sexually active, to which the girl responded: "I've already told you the story of this and don't look at me and smile because it's not funny. Oh, okay. I got raped when I was 12 years old." To which the host replied: "Right. And is that, is that the only experience you've had?"

==== 2012 royal hoax call incident ====
In December 2012, the Hot 30 program hosts, Mel Greig and Mike Christian, obtained information about the Duchess of Cambridge's health by impersonating Queen Elizabeth II and the Prince of Wales in a phone call to King Edward VII's Hospital Sister Agnes, where the Duchess was being treated for hyperemesis gravidarum. The call, made at about 5.30 am London time (GMT) on 4 December, was answered at the reception by nurse Jacintha Saldanha as no switchboard receptionist was on duty. Saldanha transferred the call to the nurse treating the Duchess, who gave details of her condition. Christian, who had only started on the show a day earlier, proposed calling the hospital in the hope of getting the Duchess on the air. The stunt was cleared by 2Day FM lawyers prior to airing. When hospital chief executive John Lofthouse learned it was a prank, he condemned it as an act of "journalistic trickery" that no nurse should have to deal with.

While the hospital has expressed concern that the prank may have broken the law, the CEO of Southern Cross Austereo, Rhys Holleran, stated that he did not believe any laws were broken. Later, Holleran said that station officials tried to contact the nurses whose voices were recorded at least five times prior to greenlighting the stunt for air. However, at least one legal expert told ABC News that the stunt may have broken New South Wales state law forbidding the recording of private conversations without the other party's consent. At a Federal Court hearing it became known that Australian media watchdog Australian Communications & Media Authority (ACMA) had prepared a confidential, preliminary report saying that the Radio Royal hoax 'broke law'. 2Day FM acted illegally by airing the phone call without consent.

The King Edward VII Hospital has stated that the radio station "did not speak to anyone in hospital senior management, or anyone at the company that handles our media enquiries" following the hoax call.

Just before 9.30 am (GMT) on 7 December, Saldanha was found dead at her accommodation near the hospital in a suspected suicide. Police said the death was being treated as "unexplained" and the Duke and Duchess of Cambridge said they were "deeply saddened" by the news. 2Day FM continued to promote the prank for a time after Saldanha's death. Holleran said the presenters were both "deeply shocked" and would not return to their radio show until further notice. With advertisers boycotting the station or threatening to do so, Southern Cross Austereo suspended all advertising on 2Day FM until at least 10 December.

The hospital chairman, Lord Glenarthur, wrote a letter to Southern Cross Austereo protesting Greig and Christian's actions: "King Edward VII's Hospital cares for sick people, and it was extremely foolish of your presenters even to consider trying to lie their way through to one of our patients, let alone actually make the call." Southern Cross Austereo chairman Max Moore-Wilton wrote back to Lord Glenarthur promising "immediate action" and a full review of the process by which the broadcast was cleared. At an emergency meeting, Austereo announced that advertising would remain suspended on 2Day FM until at least 12 December. It also formally cancelled the Hot 30 program and suspended prank-call stunts on all Austereo stations, effective immediately. That night, Greig and Christian gave their first interviews since Saldanha's death, telling Nine Network's A Current Affair and Seven Network's Today Tonight that they were still badly shaken over the tragedy. Austereo also cancelled its yearly Christmas party for the employees in its Sydney cluster out of respect for Saldanha's family and donated the money it planned to spend on the party to Beyond Blue and Lifeline.

On 12 December, Southern Cross Austereo announced that advertising on 2Day FM would resume the next day. It will donate the remainder of station advertising proceeds for 2012—a minimum of $A500,000 (£320,000)—to a memorial fund that will benefit Saldanha's family.

The Metropolitan Police made contact with NSW Police about the incident as part of their investigation into the death.

On 13 December, ABC News reported that ACMA opened a formal investigation into the prank call. The same day, The Guardian reported about three suicide notes left by Jacintha before her death, two of which were found at the scene and one in her belongings. It said one of them dealt with the prank call, another contained requests for her funeral and the third was critical of the staff of the hospital.

On 27 January 2013, Southern Cross Austereo announced on its Facebook page that the Hot 30 show responsible for the prank would not be returning, and instead replaced it with a new, networked night show titled The Bump Show hosted by O'Loughlin. For a brief period it was replaced by an international syndication of Ryan Seacrest.

Mike Christian returned to broadcasting in February 2013. Mel Greig received counselling for depression and quit her job with the station after a year. It was reported that she had objected to the broadcast but was overruled by station managers. In January 2016, Greig began co-hosting the 96.5 Wave FM breakfast show, The Hot Breakfast, with Travis Winks, after a three-year hiatus. In 2018, Greig left Wave FM to move back to Sydney, citing personal reasons.
