= Rachel Corbett (radio presenter) =

Australian broadcaster and podcaster

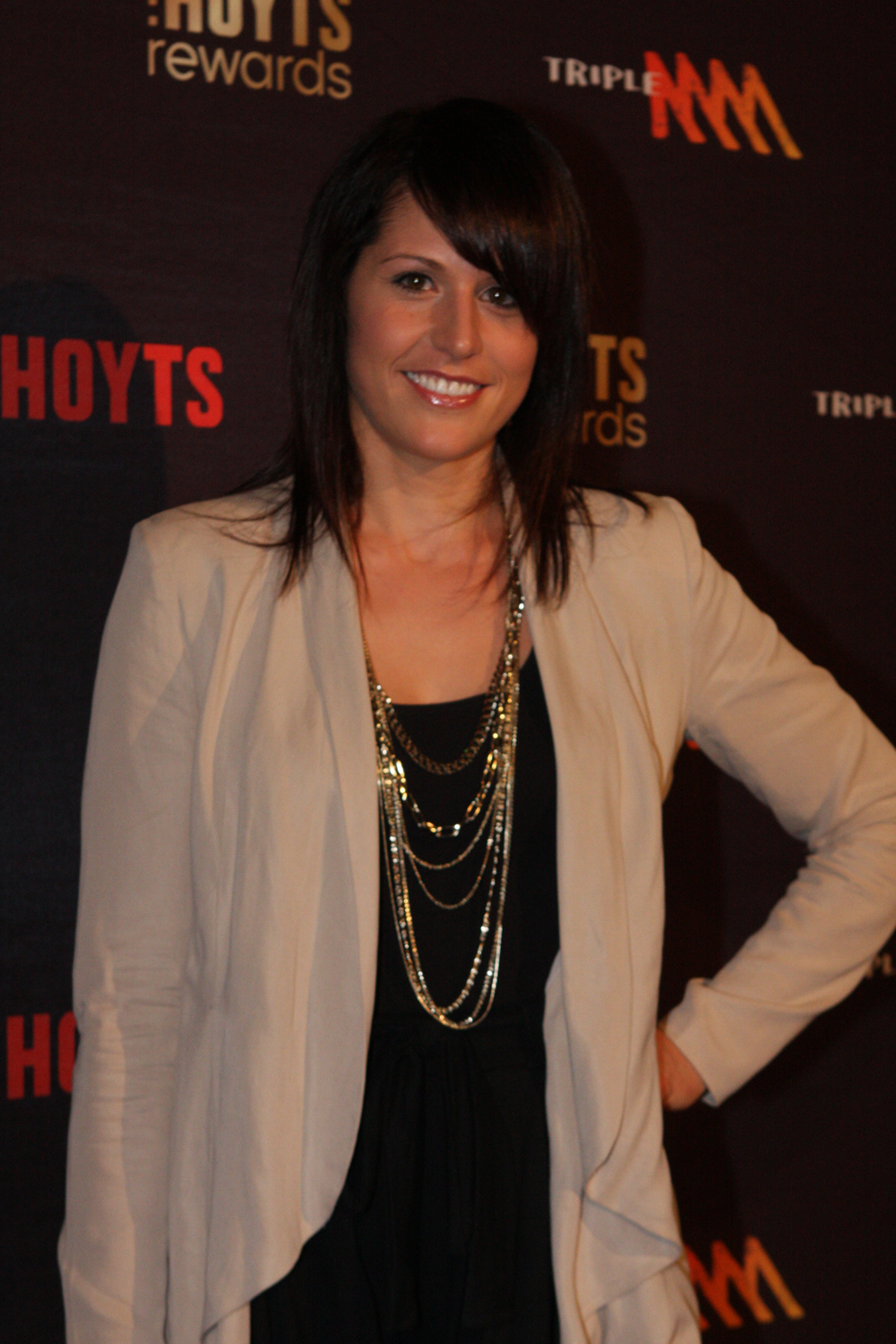
- Corbett at the premiere of The Nullarbor Nymph in 2012
- Education: Presbyterian Ladies' College, Sydney
- Occupations: Podcaster; Radio and television presenter; Writer
- Employer: Nova Entertainment
- Television: The Project
- Title: Network director, Nova Podcasts
- Website: rachelcorbett.com.au

Rachel Corbett is an Australian podcaster, radio and television presenter, and writer. She has presented breakfast and drive-time radio programmes, including Merrick and the Highway Patrol on Triple M, and was a regular panellist and occasional host on Network 10's The Project.

She founded the online podcasting course PodSchool and led the podcast division of Mamamia before joining Nova Entertainment in 2020. As of 2026, she is network director of Nova Podcasts.

== Education ==
Corbett graduated from Presbyterian Ladies' College, Sydney in 1998. She subsequently completed a commerce degree but did not complete her law degree.

== Career ==
=== Radio ===
After appearing on Big Brother Australia, Corbett was named a co-presenter of Triple M Melbourne's breakfast programme Morning Madhouse in 2002, alongside Steve Bedwell and James Brayshaw. Her radio work also included breakfast and drive-time presenting at Hit 104.1 in Sydney and 92.9 in Perth.

From September 2009 to the end of 2010, she co-hosted Triple M Sydney's drive programme with Paul Murray. In February 2012, she joined Merrick Watts and Julian Schiller on Triple M's Merrick and the Highway Patrol, a weekday drive show. Southern Cross Austereo cancelled the programme in 2013. Its final broadcast was in November that year.

=== Television ===
Corbett was a writer and performer on ABC2's satirical news programme The Roast. She was a cast member when the programme expanded to ten-minute weekday episodes in April 2013.

She was also a regular panellist and occasional host on The Project. In October 2017, she was a regular Thursday contributor. She appeared on the programme's final broadcast in June 2025. Her other television appearances include the ABC discussion programme Q+A. She has also appeared on Today, Have You Been Paying Attention? and Hughesy, We Have a Problem.

=== Podcasting ===
In January 2014, Corbett and Murray launched the podcast Paul & Rach. She also taught radio and podcasting at the Australian Film, Television and Radio School. In 2014–15, she was a guest lecturer in its Advanced Diploma in Radio. In September 2016, she established PodSchool, an online podcasting course.

In March 2017, she created You've Gotta Start Somewhere. The podcast features interviews about careers in broadcasting; guests have included Carrie Bickmore, who discussed her early radio work. Her podcasts also include The PodSchool Podcast.

In September 2017, Mamamia appointed Corbett director of podcasts. She also wrote columns for Mamamia and continued to run PodSchool. Her presenting work for Mamamia included the dating podcast Eligible and guest hosting on Mamamia Out Loud. In 2018, she hosted and produced Lady Startup, an interview podcast about women in business. She was a co-host and executive producer of Sealed Section. In 2019, she co-hosted Before the Bump with Zoe Marshall.

She resigned as head of podcasts in March 2020. On leaving, she said that the network had grown from 15 to more than 35 shows during her tenure. In 2020, she assisted AFTRS students with their assessment broadcasts.

In 2020, Corbett hosted Rethink, a seven-part podcast about marketing produced by Google with the agencies The Hallway and Eardrum. That September, she joined Nova Entertainment as head of podcasts and digital content, overseeing its podcast and digital output.

Her podcast Me and My Tiny Human, which began in 2024, discusses her experiences of parenting as a single mother. In a 2024 interview, she said that Nova sought podcast hosts with established audiences and considered advertising opportunities when commissioning or acquiring shows. In August 2026, she was network director of Nova Podcasts.
