= The Grill Team =

- Genre: Sport, Comedy and Music (Breakfast)
- Running time: 180 minutes
- Country of origin: Australia
- Language: English
- Home station: Triple M Sydney
- Starring: Gus Worland; Matthew Johns; Emma Freedman; Chris Page
- Produced by: Jana Hocking
- Executive producer: Max Dudley
- Original release: 17 August 2009 – December 2018
- Website: Official Triple M site
- Podcast: The Grill Team

The Grill Team was an Australian breakfast radio show that broadcasts weekday mornings from 6 am to 9 am AEST on Triple M Sydney. It commenced broadcasting on 17 August 2009. On 21 December 2018, it was announced that the show would be replaced with Moonman in the Morning, hosted by Lawrence Mooney

The Grill Team members were Gus Worland, former rugby league footballer Matthew Johns, panel operator Chris Page, TV and radio presenter Emma Freedman

== Format ==
The Grill Team format is based on a format pioneered by Triple M Melbourne in the early '90s, merging sport, comedy and music. Triple M Melbourne is going back to this similar format by starting a new breakfast program called The Hot Breakfast with Eddie McGuire which will be similar to the Grill Team concept which McGuire was originally part of in the '90s.

It has been reported that Triple M Sydney has had five attempts in seven years to put together a successful breakfast program. Austereo's program director Guy Dobson was quoted as saying "Sport will be the DNA that courses through Triple M's veins. Sport to men is what celebrity is for women. Rock music is still a large part of Triple M but these days that means everything from Pink to Cold Chisel. Sport is the binding notion that is going to hold Triple M together."

HG Nelson was the first guest on the show.

== Presenters ==
- Matthew Johns
- Mark Geyer
- Gus Worland
- Chris Page

== History ==
In December 2010, Stuart MacGill decided not to renew his contract with Triple M, Sami Lukis resigned and Byron Cooke left the show to take up a position at Fox FM in Melbourne.

In October 2016, Triple M announced that Emma Freedman would leave the Hit Network to join the team as a presenter.

In December 2017, Mark Geyer resigned from the show to host The Rush Hour.

In November 2018, Matthew Johns announced his resignation from Triple M, he will finish at the end of the year.

On 21 December 2018, it was announced that the show was being replaced by Moonman in the Morning, hosted by Lawrence Mooney which will still feature Worland and Page.
