= Surprise Surprise Gotcha =

- Genre: Practical joke
- Presented by: Matt Tilley; Jackie O
- Country of origin: Australia
- Original language: English
- No. of seasons: 1
- No. of episodes: 6

Production
- Running time: 60 minutes (inc. commercials)

Original release
- Network: Nine Network
- Release: 18 September – 23 October 2007

Related
- Surprise Surprise

Surprise Surprise Gotcha is an Australian hidden camera practical joke television series. Hosted by radio personalities Matt Tilley and Jackie O, the series commenced on the Nine Network on 18 September 2007.

== Overview ==
The title incorporated "Gotcha" from Tilley's "gotcha calls" on his highly successful The Matt and Jo Show on Fox FM. The series sets up Australian celebrities to fall prey to elaborate practical jokes. Celebrity victims include Shane Crawford, Tara Moss, Dermott Brereton and Amanda Keller. The series was produced and directed by Marc Gracie.

Surprise Surprise, a series with the same premise hosted by Jay Laga'aia, had previously aired on Nine in 2000.

== Performed gags ==
- After Temptation's Ed Phillips had co-host Livinia Nixon locked in a phone booth, she invites Ed to a wedding with bizarre cultural aspects.
- AFL player Shane Crawford gets his own back on horse trainer David Hayes when he finds himself at lunch with a nine-year-old genius who astounds him with his knowledge of the racing industry.
- Karl Stefanovic of Today has a very difficult interview with an Arab sheik who wants to turn Princes Park in Melbourne into a winter wonderland.
- Author Tara Moss has car trouble which causes chaos in the streets.
- Dermott Brereton goes to lunch with Getaway's Jules Lund where the food is not just fresh ... it's alive.
- Billy Slater, of the Melbourne Storm, discovers he has his own web site.
- Radio personality Amanda Keller comes into a lot of money ... but not for long, as she discovers.
- Charli Robinson, of Hi-5 and Getaway, finds herself cruising Sydney Harbour with a bizarre charity.
- Toni Pearen, of Australia's Funniest Home Videos, attends a charity function at Sydney's Luna Park, only to take a very, very long ride on the Ferris wheel.
- Today's Gorgi Quill meets a guy who is having the unluckiest day of his life.
