= 2006 in Australian television =

== Events ==
- 1 January – Mildura Digital Television, a joint venture between WIN Television Mildura and Prime Television, goes on air in the Mildura area of Victoria as a Network Ten digital-only affiliate.
- 2 January – The Seven, Foxtel and Ten Networks outbid Channel Nine and are awarded the rights to broadcast the AFL from 2007 to 2011 for a record $780 million. Also around this time, Seven announce that they have won the rights to broadcast the V8 Supercars from 2007 to 2014.
- 30 January – At 6am, Channel Nine launches a new logo and a major revamp, dropping the dots and replacing it with a stand-alone nine in a blue box. On the same day, Wheel of Fortune returns to Seven Network with Larry Emdur and Laura Csortan as hosts. Their stint ran for five months, as the final edition of the programme was screened on 28 July, after twenty-five years of broadcasting. The original series later returned with twenty unaired episodes from 2005, featuring former hosts Steve Omecke and Sophie Falkiner, which would air at 10am for five weeks, until 1 September.
- 9 February – The Nine Network announces Eddie McGuire in his new role as the network's new CEO.
- 20 February – Television Sydney formally launches after three months of testing, giving Sydney community television for the first time in almost two years.
- 1 April – The final season of Blue Heelers goes to air now on Saturday Nights, pitting it against ABC's The Bill and Network Ten's AFL coverage.
- 3 April – After weeks of poor ratings Who Wants to Be a Millionaire? airs for the final time on Monday Nights. It returns for a short period following an 18-month break due to McGuire's role as CEO for the Nine Network.
- 9 May – Sunrise weather presenter Grant Denyer and his partner Amanda Garner win the fourth season of Dancing with the Stars.
- 21 May – Brant Webb and Todd Russell speak to new A Current Affair host Tracy Grimshaw about their time underground in Beaconsfield in a 2-hour special called The Great Escape. They are paid a reported $2.6 million by Channel Nine for the right to talk to them.
- 4 June – After 12 years and a record-breaking 510 episodes, the last episode of the Seven Network show Blue Heelers goes to air.
- 30 June – Australian soap opera Neighbours broadcasts its 5000th episode, which sees Paul Robinson trapped in a mineshaft by his son Robert.
- 7 July – Children's fantasy drama series H_{2}O: Just Add Water starring Claire Holt, Phoebe Tonkin and Cariba Heine premieres on Network Ten.
- 9 July – The British nature documentary series Planet Earth, narrated by David Attenborough, premieres on the ABC.
- 18 July – Australian kids program Play School celebrates 40 years on air.
- 31 July – Jamie Brooksby wins the sixth season of Big Brother.
- 29 August – Model Jake Wall and his professional skating partner Maria Filippov win the first season of Torvill and Dean's Dancing on Ice.
- 14 September – Today Tonight host Naomi Robson is deported from Indonesia after doing a story on a West Papuan boy called Wa Wa who, supposedly, was going to be eaten by cannibals. This sparks a war of words between Seven and Nine, who ran the original story on Wa Wa in May on 60 Minutes. Naomi presents her final edition of Today Tonight on 1 December.
- 16 September – Television in Australia turns 50. The next day, this is commemorated with a live TV special from Star City, Sydney on the Seven Network.
- 29 September Backyard Blitz finishes its 6-year run on the Nine Network. Jamie Durie leaves Nine and signs up with the Seven Network, the next year, he dances his way on Dancing with the Stars.
- 30 September – The Fox Footy Channel ceases broadcasting then later revived as Fox Footy in 2012. It is replaced by Fox Sports 3 and Fox Sports News on 1 October.
- 18 October – PBL announces the sale of 50% of the Nine Network, including its 50% stake in ninemsn and ACP to CVC Asia Pacific for $4.5 billion.
- 26 November – Irishman Damien Leith defeats 17-year-old Jessica Mauboy to be based only on Sony BMG after being crowned the title of Australian Idol 2006 at the Sydney Opera House.
- 28 November – AFL player Anthony Koutoufides (Kouta) and his partner Natalie Lowe win the fifth season of Dancing with the Stars.
- 10 December – Network Ten and Fox Sports broadcasts V8 Supercars for the final-ever time, before handing the television rights to the Seven Network from 2007 to 2014. Ten and Fox Sports later revived the V8 Supercars coverage 9 years later.
- Voiceover artist Robbie McGregor leaves SBS after 17 years. He is replaced the next year by Lani John Tupu.

== New channels ==
- 1 October – Fox Sports 3
- 1 October – Fox Sports News
- 15 November – Al Jazeera English
- 1 December – Sci Fi Channel

== Premieres ==
=== Free-to-air television ===
Program	Channel	Debut date
RAN – Remote Area Nurse	SBS TV	5 January
9am with David and Kim	Network Ten	30 January
The Biggest Loser	Network Ten	13 February
Bert's Family Feud	Nine Network	13 February
Bondi Rescue	Network Ten	15 February
The Chaser's War on Everything	ABC TV	17 February
Head 2 Head	ABC TV	18 February
Clever	Nine Network	19 February
Magda's Funny Bits	Nine Network	21 February
Where Are They Now?	Seven Network	26 February
Thank God You're Here	Network Ten	5 April
Hello/Goodbye	Nine Network	11 May
It Takes Two	Seven Network	28 May
What's Good For You	Nine Network	29 May
The Wedge	Network Ten	30 May
Can We Help?	ABC TV	9 June
Wine Me, Dine Me	Nine Network	21 June
Mortified	Nine Network	30 June
H_{2}O: Just Add Water	Network Ten	7 July
Torvill and Dean's Dancing on Ice	Nine Network	11 July
Honey, We're Killing the Kids	Network Ten	12 July
Quizmania	Nine Network	25 July
jtv	ABC TV	29 July
First Tuesday Book Club	ABC TV	1 August
Cybershack	Network Ten	1 August
Yasmin's Getting Married	Network Ten	1 August
You May Be Right; Axed after four episodes	Seven Network	13 August
Two Twisted	Nine Network	14 August
The Master; Axed after one episode but returned later in the year	Seven Network	16 August
David Tench Tonight	Network Ten	17 August
The Force: Behind the Line	Seven Network	22 August
Real Stories	Network Ten	22 August
Police Files: Unlocked	Seven Network	6 September
Good Game	ABC2	19 September
What a Year	Nine Network	2 October
The Real Seachange	Seven Network	8 October
Operatunity Oz	ABC TV	8 October
Big Questions	Nine Network	19 October
Tripping Over	Network Ten	25 October
Do It	Nine Network	5 November
Speaking in Tongues	SBS TV	7 November
Food Safari	SBS TV	6 December
Puzzle Play	Network Ten	21 December

=== Subscription television ===
Program	Channel	Debut date
Crown Australian Celebrity Poker Challenge	FOX8	5 January
An Aussie Goes Barmy	FOX8	29 November

== New international programming ==
Program	Channel	Debut date
(United Kingdom) Garth Marenghi's Darkplace	SBS TV	30 January
(United States) Prison Break	Seven Network	1 February
(United States) Hi Hi Puffy AmiYumi	Nine Network	5 February
(Japan) One Piece (4Kids version)	Network Ten	13 February
(Japan) Mew Mew Power	Network Ten	13 February
(United Kingdom) Doc Martin	ABC TV	18 February
(United Kingdom) Roobarb and Custard Too	ABC TV	20 February
(France) The Gnoufs	ABC TV	20 February
(United States) The Buzz on Maggie	Seven Network	25 February
(United States) / (Canada) Pinky Dinky Doo	ABC TV	27 February
(Belgium) A Town Called Panic	ABC TV	28 February
(United Kingdom) The Amazing Adrenalini Brothers (TV series)	ABC TV	2 March
(Canada) / (United States) Edgar and Ellen	ABC TV	2 March
(France) / (Republic of Ireland) Zombie Hotel	ABC TV	2 March
(France) / (Canada) Skyland	ABC TV	2 March
(United Kingdom) New Captain Scarlet	ABC2	6 March
(Canada) Lunar Jim	ABC TV	14 March
(Japan) Samurai Champloo	SBS TV	23 March
(United States) Bratz	Network Ten	31 March
(United Kingdom) The Worst Week of My Life	ABC TV	5 April
(United Kingdom) Help! I'm a Teenage Outlaw	ABC TV	11 April
(Canada) Class of the Titans	ABC TV	18 April
(United States) Animal Jam	ABC TV	25 April
(United States) / (Canada) Gerald McBoing-Boing	ABC TV	1 May
(Canada) Delilah & Julius	ABC2	5 May
(France) ATOM	Seven Network	20 May
(United Kingdom) Dr. Dog	ABC TV	23 May
(Canada) / (New Zealand) Jane and the Dragon	ABC TV	25 May
(Spain) / (South Korea) Bernard	ABC TV	25 May
(United States) All Grown Up!	Network Ten	13 June
(United States) The Wubbulous World of Dr. Seuss	ABC2	15 June
(United States) The New Adventures of Old Christine	Nine Network	6 July
(United States) My Life as a Teenage Robot	Network Ten	7 July
(United Kingdom) Planet Earth	ABC TV	9 July
(United Kingdom) Bleak House	ABC TV	9 July
(Brazil) City of Men	SBS TV	17 July
(United States) The Emperor's New School	Seven Network	22 July
(United States) Dora the Explorer	Nine Network	23 July
(United Kingdom) / (Canada) Harry and His Bucket Full of Dinosaurs	ABC TV	31 July
(Japan) Yu-Gi-Oh! GX	Network Ten	15 August
(United States) Avatar: The Last Airbender	ABC TV	24 August
(Canada) Naughty, Naughty Pets	ABC TV	29 August
(United Kingdom) Monkey Dust	ABC2	29 August
(United States) Princess Natasha	ABC TV	29 August
(Canada) / (France) Miss BG	ABC TV	5 September
(United States) Stuart Little: The Animated Series	Network Ten	9 September
(United Kingdom) Sensitive Skin	ABC TV	15 September
(United States) Jericho	Network Ten	21 September
(United States) The Batman	Nine Network	23 September
(United Kingdom) The IT Crowd	ABC TV	27 September
(United Kingdom) The Secret Show	ABC TV	5 October
(Canada) Time Warp Trio	ABC TV	6 October
(United States) Biker Mice from Mars (2006)	Network Ten	13 October
(Australia) / (New Zealand) Staines Down Drains	Seven Network	22 October
(United States) Curious George	ABC TV	23 October
(United States) The Unit	Seven Network	25 October
(United Kingdom) Those Scurvy Rascals	ABC TV	30 October
(France) Code Lyoko	Network Ten	1 November
(Spain) Dougie in Disguise	ABC2	12 November
(United States) / (Canada) PollyWorld	Seven Network	12 November
(United Kingdom) Little Princess	ABC TV	13 November
(France) Louie	ABC TV	22 November
(Belgium) Russian Dolls: Sex Trade	SBS TV	2 December
(United Kingdom) Wild at Heart	Network Ten	3 December
(New Zealand) SCU: Serious Crash Unit	Seven Network	5 December
(United States) Life As We Know It	Seven Network	5 December
(United Kingdom) Top Gear	SBS TV	12 December
(Australia) / (Canada) Erky Perky	Seven Network	26 December

=== Subscription television ===
Program	Channel	Debut date
(United States) Entourage	Arena	1 January
(United States) Hannah Montana	Disney Channel	21 April
(United States) The Surreal Life (Beginning with season 3, seasons 1 and 2 aired later)	VH1	June
(United States) Kept	VH1	June
(United Kingdom) Emmerdale	UKTV	2 July
(United States) Strange Love	VH1	5 September
(United States) Supergroup	VH1	6 September
(United States) So NoTORIous	VH1	2 October
(United States) House of Carters	E!	4 November
(United States) Celebrity Fit Club	VH1	2 December

== Programming changes ==
=== Changes to network affiliation ===
This is a list of programs which made their premiere on an Australian television network that had previously premiered on another Australian television network. The networks involved in the switch of allegiances are predominantly both free-to-air networks or both subscription television networks. Programs that have their free-to-air/subscription television premiere, after previously premiering on the opposite platform (free-to air to subscription/subscription to free-to air) are not included. In some cases, programs may still air on the original television network. This occurs predominantly with programs shared between subscription television networks.

Program	New network	Previous network	Date
(United Kingdom) Mopatop's Shop	ABC2	ABC Kids (now defunct)	3 April
(United Kingdom) Fourways Farm	ABC2	ABC Kids (now defunct)	5 April
(Wales) Fireman Sam (Original series)	ABC2	ABC Kids (now defunct)	11 April
(United Kingdom) / (Canada) / (United States) Anthony Ant	ABC2	ABC Kids (now defunct)	4 June
(United Kingdom) Teletubbies	ABC2	ABC Kids (now defunct)	3 July
(Canada) / (Australia) Yakkity Yak	ABC TV	Network Ten	13 September
(United States) / (Japan) Sonic X	Seven Network	Network Ten	18 November

=== Subscription premieres ===
This is a list of programs which made their premiere on Australian subscription television that had previously premiered on Australian free-to-air television. Programs may still air on the original free-to-air television network.

==== International ====
Program	Subscription network	Free-to-air network	Date
(United States) Lost	Fox8	Seven Network	27 November

== Television shows ==
=== 1960s ===
- Four Corners (1961–present)

=== 1980s ===
- Wheel of Fortune (1981–1996, 1996–2003, 2004 –2006)
- Neighbours (1985–present)
- Home and Away (1988–present)
- The Movie Show (1986–2008)
- Rage (1987–present)

=== 1990s ===
- Hotline (1990–2007)
- Australia's Funniest Home Videos (1990–present)

=== 2000s ===
2001

- Big Brother (2001–2008, 2012–2014)

2002

2003

- Australian Idol (2003–2009)
- Deal or No Deal (2003–2013)

2004

- Border Security: Australia's Front Line (2004–present)
- Dancing with the Stars (2004–present)

2005

- Medical Emergency (2005–present)

== Ending this year ==
Date	Show	Channel	Debut
21 January	headLand	Seven Network	15 November 2005
23 January	Speaking in Tongues	SBS TV	7 November 2005
4 June	Blue Heelers	Seven Network	18 January 1994
28 July	Wheel of Fortune	Seven Network	21 July 1981
27 August	Business Sunday	Nine Network	2 March 1986
4 September	You May Be Right	Seven Network	13 August 2006
21 October 2006	Midnight Zoo	Seven Network	31 July 2006
29 October 2006	Operatunity Oz	ABC TV	8 October 2006
18 November 2006	So Fresh TV	Nine Network	6 September 2003
26 November	Sportsworld	Seven Network	1987
29 November	The Glass House	ABC TV	10 August 2001
9 December	Head 2 Head	ABC TV	18 February 2006
20 December	In the Box	Network Ten	21 December 1998
27 December 2006	An Aussie Goes Barmy	FOX8	29 November 2006

== See also ==
- 2006 in Australia
- List of Australian films of 2006
