= Matt & Jane =

- Other names: Matt Tilley & Jane Hall for Breakfast
- Genre: Radio show
- Running time: 180 minutes
- Country of origin: Australia
- Language(s): English
- Home station: KIIS 101.1 Melbourne
- Hosted by: Matt Tilley; Jane Hall; Simon Baggs
- Produced by: Alex Day
- Executive producer(s): Alisson Longhurst
- Original release: 19 January – 4 December 2015
- Audio format: Stereo
- Website: KIIS 101.1

Matt & Jane was an Australian breakfast radio show with Matt Tilley and Jane Hall with anchor Simon Baggs. The show aired weekdays between 6 am and 9 am on KIIS 101.1 in Melbourne. The show commenced on 19 January 2015 and finished on 4 December 2015. News, sport, weather and traffic updates were presented by Krystal Keller, and Tommy Jackett was announced as the show's Digital Content Producer.

== History ==
In November 2014, Australian Radio Network announced that Mix 101.1 would be rebranded as KIIS 101.1 on 19 January 2015 with a new breakfast show including Matt Tilley and Jane Hall. The new breakfast show replaced Chrissie & Jane which featured Chrissie Swan and Jane Hall. Matt Tilley had previously hosted The Matt & Jo Show on Fox FM and The One Percenters on Triple M.

In October 2015, Jane Hall announced that she would be leaving the station at the end of the year to return to acting. Meshel Laurie was announced as Hall's replacement, with the show renamed Matt & Meshel.
