= Weekend Breakfast (radio show) =

- Genre: Radio show
- Running time: 2 hours
- Country of origin: Australia
- Language: English
- Home station: Fox FM
- Syndicates: Hit Network
- Recording studio: Melbourne
- Original release: 17 February 2018 – December 2021
- Website: Weekend Breakfast

Weekend Breakfast was an Australian radio station breakfast show on the Hit Network. The show aired from 7 am to 9 am on weekend mornings with music and daily topic discussions and special guests. News, sport, weather and traffic updates were presented throughout the show.

== History ==
In September 2013, Southern Cross Austereo announced Sophie Monk and Dave Thornton as hosts of Weekend Breakfast with Michael Christian as anchor. Monk and Thornton finished on Weekend Breakfast in December 2013 both moving to new roles on the network. Dave Thornton hosted Fifi & Dave on Fox FM in Melbourne and Sophie Monk hosted Breakfast on 2Day FM in 2014 but left the station to make way for The Dan & Maz Show in 2015.

In January 2014, Southern Cross Austereo announced that the show would be returning with new hosts, former Fox FM breakfast co-host Jo Stanley, former SAFM breakfast co-host Michael Beveridge and Fox FM morning announcer Byron Cooke.

In December 2014, Byron Cooke was appointed Sea FM Central Coast breakfast host and as a result left the show.

In October 2015, Southern Cross Austereo announced that The Dan & Maz Show would replace Weekend Breakfast from 2016.

In February 2018, Weekend Breakfast returned to the Hit Network with new hosts former Hit104.7 breakfast presenter Tanya Hennessy and Danny Lakey.

In November 2018, Angus O'Loughlin replaced Danny Lakey and in January 2019, Dylan Alcott joined the show.

In December 2019, Tanya Hennessy resigned from the show to pursue a career away from radio.

In January 2021, Juelz Jarry joined the show, previously she hosted Xavier, Juelz & Pete on 92.9 in Perth. In October 2021, Alcott resigned from the show. In December 2021, O'Loughlin resigned from the show to pursue a career outside of radio.
