= The Final Call (album) =

Gotcha Calls - The Final Call

Studio album by Matt Tilley
- Released: 23 October 2009
- Genre: Comedy

Matt Tilley chronology
Cereal Pest: Gotcha Calls – Three's a Crowd (2007)	Gotcha Calls - The Final Call (2009)

The Final Call is the fourth and final segment of the "Matt Tilley's Gotcha Calls" CD series, which consists of 27 of the "gotcha" phone calls that were made by Matt Tilley between 2008 and 2009. The calls are written and performed by Tilley, and recorded by Troy Ellis, the anchor of Tilley's radio show, The Matt & Jo Show on Fox FM. Tilley's pranks usually featured him making prank phone calls. Triple M also features Tilley on his grill team segment, where he presents the gotcha calls on a regular basis.

== Track listing ==
=== Disc 1 ===
1. "Rough End Of The Pineapple" - Matt confronts a foul-mouthed lady about a pineapple she stole from a restaurant a year previously.
2. "What A Shocker!" - Posing as a telemarketer, Matt convinces a man that by pressing the hash key on his phone, he can deliver an electric shock to the caller.
3. "Cat...Food?" - Matt poses as the runner of a competition to win 12 cats - unfortunately, the winner hates cats.
4. "Not So Flash, Gordon" - Matt and Jo disguise their radio show as a religious show in a trick to sting Gordon Ramsay.
5. "The Holy Hoon" - Matt confronts a man about performing burnouts in the carpark of his friend's wedding.
6. "Virgin On The Ridiculous" - Matt, disguised as Richard Branson, has a heated conversation with a Tasmanian water business owner over the use of his brandname 'Virgin'.
7. "How Low Can You Go?" - Disguised as pesky Indian Arjib, Matt attempts to barter with a travel agency manager to get a better deal on some airfares.
8. "Can't Find Top Gear" - Matt convinces an Australian Top Gear auditionee to feign driving a car - complete with sound effects.
9. "The Bad Egg" - Posing as a cop, Matt fakes a daughter's involvement in an egging incident to get a nice reaction - complete with profanity - from her mum.
10. "Triple Treat" - Matt fakes the labour of a woman, and gets her husband on the line to listen to the feigned birth. There's one catch, however - it's not just one baby.
11. "You've Been 'Sacked'" - Once more disguised as a cop, Matt learns all about a male flashing incident from a bottle shop attendant.
12. "No Speaka The Lingo" - Matt pretends to be Italian to convince a man that his country needs him in an army service - but his Italian isn't that good.
13. "DidgeriDON'T" - Faking a ceremony of the passing of land from an Aboriginal colony to a future home-owner, Matt manages to get the poor woman to fake playing the didgeridoo.

=== Disc 2 ===
1. "Kiss My Art" - Matt poses as an art fanatic in order to get an artist to agree to paint a giant male sexual organ on his wall.
2. "Treated Like An Animal" - Matt poses as several different characters to shake up an animal lover over claims of animal cruelty.
3. "You Silly So & So" - Posing as Jeff Kennett, Matt attempts to convince former Lord Mayor John So to do various things in support of the Hawthorn Football Club in the upcoming match.
4. "Filthy Father Fondle" - Disguised as Catholic Father Peter Fondle, Matt tries to get a Catholic woman to pay off a $4,000 debt to the Church.
5. "Food For Thought" - Matt, a.k.a. Suzie Q, calls up a catering company to try and order some catering for the races - but she wants a little extra thrown in: some poisoned servings.
6. "You Ahhhh...Sole" - Disguised as the elderly Cecil, Matt tries to see how many times he can get away with subtly calling a cobbler an asshole.
7. "Get My Goat Up" - As his favourite character Arjib, Matt tries to allow his two-year-old daughter's living baby goat into a childcare centre.
8. "Put Her Behind Bars" - Matt investigates a bartender with a foul mouth about claims of cruelty to his brother.
9. "Just A Gigolo" - Matt poses as a man looking for a builder to construct a pergola - one that can satisfy the dream of his wife: to get sticky with a ripped builder.
10. "Let's Make A Deal" - Posing as a TV producer, Matt tries to get a TV auditionee to answer each of her phone calls with the phrase 'Kiss my ass!'. Of course, Matt has to pose as her mum!
11. "Shut Up!" - Matt faces his biggest "Gotcha Call" challenge yet - trying to get a word in amongst a verbal rampage from a man who won't shut up!
12. "Don't Touch My Pussy" - Matt convinces a woman that her loose cat is having sexual relations with another cat, and, over the phone, tries to get the cat to stop humping the other!
13. "Arjib's Day Off" - Arjib's at home dealing with a sick wife, an ill goat, a loose cow and an elephant standing on him, all the while attempting to sell phone plans to an exasperated man.
14. "Yuck!" - Matt coerces a man into telling a story that involves a diarrhoeic catastrophe on the side of the road, while trying to convince the man to return to his 'toilet' and get rid of the waste.

== Charts ==
Chart performance for The Gotcha Calls: The Final Call
Chart (2009)	Peak position
Australian Albums (ARIA)	8
