= Jo Stanley =

Australian broadcaster

- Born: Joanne Bailey; 6 July 1973 (age 53); Melbourne, Victoria
- Occupations: Television and radio presenter, comedian
- Television: House of Wellness
- Spouse: Darren McFarlane
- Children: 1

Joanne McFarlane (née Bailey), commonly known as Jo Stanley, is an Australian television and radio presenter and comedian.

Stanley was a host of Jo & Lehmo on Gold 104.3 from 2016 to 2017. She previously hosted Weekend Breakfast on the Hit Network and The Matt and Jo Show on Fox FM from 2003 until 2013. In 2020, Stanley created the Broad Radio podcast later launching it into a radio broadcasting platform in 2024.

== Career ==
Stanley has made guest appearances on Clever, Temptation, Australia's Brainiest Kid, The Panel, Melbourne International Comedy Festival, Thank God You're Here, The Project, Studio 10 and Hughesy, We Have a Problem.

Stanley started her radio career on Fox FM on Sunday Nights with Jodie J Hill. Jo and Jodie then moved to mornings on Fox FM with a program called Jodie & Jo, which rated highly. During the late 1990s Stanley, with Hill, began hosting Boob Tube, a comedy variety show produced by RMITV and broadcast on Melbourne's community television station Channel 31.

In 2003, Jodie & Jo moved to Triple M to host a radio show called The Whole Shebang, remaining with the show until the end of the year.

In late 2003, Tracy Bartram resigned from the breakfast show at Fox FM, and was replaced by Stanley, forming Matt, Jo and Benno with the Fabulous Adam Richard, alongside Matt Tilley, Craig Bennett and Adam Richard. With Bennett departing only months into the 2003, it was renamed The Matt & Jo Show. When the show ended in November 2013, the show was the number 1 breakfast show in Melbourne with more listeners than any other breakfast show and had led the FM share for more than 40 surveys (5 years). The show was replaced by Fifi & Dave.

Before radio, Stanley performed live with a Melbourne comedy group The Toasted Marshmallows, which later changed its name to The Gorskys. The Gorskys also featured Liam Cody and Chris Tomkins of Man Bites God. She also performed live with Jodie J Hill in a number of Melbourne International Comedy Festival shows and has appeared on Thank God You're Here.

In 2007, Stanley was a contestant on It Takes Two, with partner Anthony Callea, she was eliminated in the final on 10 July 2007, losing to Jolene Anderson and David Campbell. In late 2008, she appeared in a short film called Corrections.

Stanley was also the co-host of the series Yasmin's Getting Married, which aired for only four episodes on Network Ten, where she was joined by Ryan Phelan. Stanley also appeared on Good as Gold on the Seven Network with Mikey Robins which goes through a genre over the past 50 years of television.

In January 2014, Stanley was appointed host of Weekend Breakfast. The show currently broadcasts nationally on the Hit Network around Australia every Saturday and Sunday morning from 7-9am. In November 2015, Stanley was announced as Brigitte Duclos' replacement on Gold 104.3 breakfast with Lehmo. Jo & Lehmo commenced on 18 January 2016. After achieving success in the ratings the show was axed in November 2017, it was later announced that Christian O'Connell would replace the show in 2018.

In February 2019, Stanley was announced as co-host of the Seven Network's lifestyle program, House of Wellness alongside Luke Darcy, Rachael Finch and Luke Hines.

On September 23 2024, Stanley would launch Broad Radio for the radio landscape after launching the endeavor as a podcast in early 2020, the first radio show went to air on 7 October, with a variety of different co-hosts and topics.

== Personal life ==
Stanley attended Strathcona Baptist Girls Grammar School and Donvale Christian School.

Her maiden name is Bailey, which she changed to avoid confusion with fashion expert Jo Silvagni (née Bailey) and hairdresser Joh Bailey. Stanley is a stage name; her surname is that of her husband Darren McFarlane.

In August 2008, Stanley announced that she and husband were expecting their first child. In March 2009, she gave birth to a daughter.

She is a supporter of the Collingwood Football Club which plays in the Australian Football League. She holds a Bachelor of Arts (Honours) from Monash University, where she majored in drama and theatre studies.
