= Fifi, Fev & Nick =

Australian morning radio show

- Genre: Comedy
- Running time: 3 hours (6:00 am – 9:00 am)
- Country of origin: Australia
- Language: English
- Home station: 101.9 The Fox
- Starring: Fifi Box; Brendan Fevola; Nick Cody
- Directed by: Leon Sjogren (Content Manager)
- Produced by: Gemma Prendergast; Daniel Garisto; Azzan Schuster
- Executive producer: James Blake
- Recording studio: South Melbourne
- Original release: 18 January 2021 – present
- Podcast: https://podcasts.apple.com/au/podcast/fifi-fev-nick/id266980869

Fifi, Fev & Nick is an Australian breakfast radio show on 101.9 The Fox in Melbourne, Victoria, Australia. It is hosted by Fifi Box, Brendan Fevola and Nick Cody with anchor Josiah Shala. The show began on 20 January 2014 as Fifi & Dave, replacing The Matt & Jo Show.

The show airs from 6 am to 9 am on weekday mornings with music and daily topic discussions and special guests. A highlights package of the show, Fifi, Fev & Nick's Happy Hour airs weeknights from 6pm to 7pm across the Hit Network.

A daily podcast featuring the best bits from each show is available on LiSTNR as is the podcast for all Hit Network breakfast shows in Australia.

News, sport, weather and traffic updates are presented by Alexandra Bryant.

== History ==
=== Fifi & Dave ===
The show was founded in January 2014, replacing The Matt & Jo Show with Matt Tilley and Jo Stanley. Prior to joining the breakfast show Fifi Box was host of Fifi and Jules with Jules Lund. Dave Thornton previously filled in for Matt Tilley when he was sick and hosted Mamamia Today with Em Rusciano, and anchor Dan Anstey moved from rival station Nova 100 to Fox FM to anchor the show.

Kylie Minogue was the first guest on the show.

In December 2015, Southern Cross Austereo announced that Dan Anstey would leave the show; he was replaced by Sea FM's Byron Cooke.

In April 2016, Brendan Fevola joined the show as host, and the show renamed to Fifi, Dave & Fev.

=== Fifi, Fev & Byron ===
In January 2017, anchor Byron Cooke was added to the show's title, and it was renamed to Fifi, Dave, Fev & Byron. In September 2017, Dave Thornton announced his resignation from Fox FM.

In June 2019, Southern Cross Austereo announced that Yvie Jones would fill in for Fifi Box while she was on maternity leave. Box returned from maternity leave on 16 September 2019.

=== Fifi, Fev & Nick ===
In November 2020, Cooke had announced his departure from the show on air for personal reasons and to also seek new challenges. Cooke's replacement was announced as comedian Nick Cody. Fifi, Fev & Nick commenced from 18 January 2021.

In February 2021, Josiah Shala joined the show as anchor.

In June 2023, the show earned a Guinness World Record for Longest marathon for a radio music show DJ (team) after broadcasting for 27 Hours and adhering to strict guidelines.

In March 2025, Brendan Fevola announced that he is taking part in The Amazing Race Australia: Celebrity Edition with his daughter, leading to his temporary absence from the show. Jules Lund was his replacement during the filming period.

== Regular segments ==
- Brekky in the Burbs: Fifi, Fev & Nick broadcast live from suburbs across Melbourne.
- Celebri-Fi News: Fifi covers the biggest celebrity news stories of the day
- Nickname Detective: Fifi, Fev & Nick guess listeners nicknames.
- Tradie-oke: Tradies ring into the show and sing.
- Is It Amazing?: Listeners share amazing stories and Fifi, Fev & Nick determine if it is amazing or not.
- Fev's DMs: Fev reads out rumours that have slid into his direct messages.
- Fox to the Rescue: Fifi, Fev & Nick love to give back to the community and help listeners.
- Hughesy Tuesday: Dave Hughes has a chat with Fifi, Fev & Nick.
- Fifi, Fev & Nick Bulletin: Alexandra Bryant presents a bulletin of all the best moments from the week.
- We Got One: Fifi, Fev & Nick ask a wild question and just need one caller to call in to with a story
- Battle of The Sexes: Two contestants (male and female) go head to head to win a prize with a tally recorded to see who is the ultimate sex
