= The Gorskys =

Australian comedy team

The Gorskys are an Australian comedy team. They have performed on stage, radio, television and the internet. They are also the creators of GORSKYS.COMedy, one of the world's longest-running comedy websites (started in 1995).

== Lineup ==
Originally known as the Toasted Marshmallows (from 1992–1997), the Gorskys began performing after the founding members met at Monash University (Clayton) whilst performing in the Monash Players annual comedy review "Slimy Crappy People".

The original members were Liam Cody, Chris Tomkins, Jo Stanley and Samantha Stone.

Stone left in 1994 and was replaced by Barbara Joseph. Joseph left a year later.

Jo Stanley stopped performing with the Gorskys in 1999 when she began on Melbourne radio network, Fox FM.

Liam Cody died after a long battle with cancer on 28 August 2007.

Chris Tomkins continued publishing the GORSKYS.COMedy website until 2015.

== Radio ==
The Gorskys wrote and performed sketches for independent radio, Melbourne's PBS-FM from 1993–95. They went on to write and perform sketches for ABC radio including a short series entitled "Taxi" in which the regular taxi driver characters would pick up and have a discussion with a bizarre passenger each episode.

== Online ==
GORSKYS.COMedy (born 1995)

In an effort to "make the internet funny", The Gorskys began their own website in 1995 on which they re-published numerous articles written previously for street press and other publications, and made available video and audio grabs from the sketches they had produced for radio and television. It also includes a "celebrity photos" section, in which Liam, Jo and Chris are pictured "photoshopped" into photos with celebrities.

In 2007 GORSKYS.COMedy had over 500 articles and received on average 500,000 visitors per month.

Cheat Sheet (1999–2001)

One of the internet's earliest "vodcasts", Cheat Sheet had the catchphrase "Everything you need to know to look like you know everything". Weekly news and current affairs analysis with a humorous twist produced in association with RealMedia.

The Gorskys Dot Comedy Show (2001)

Liam and Chris created the self-described "world's first online comedy festival show" in 2001, appearing nightly for the duration of the Melbourne International Comedy Festival in a 5- to 10-minute downloadable vodcast in which they discussed the days news and answered questions from their viewers all over the world.

The Adventures of Terrence and Spider – Professional Bouncers (2002)

After their self-declared "World's first online comedy festival show", Liam and Chris created the self-described "world's first animated comedy festival show". This came in the form of a short 2–3 minute cartoon series released roughly every five days during the 2002 Melbourne International Comedy Festival. Whilst the original plan was to release daily, the team had underestimated the amount of work required to achieve this goal. The theme tune was written and performed by Melbourne band Man Bites God, of which Tomkins is a member.

== Television ==
The Gorskys first opportunity to create television sketches came when Jo Stanley (with Jodie J Hill) began hosting "Boob Tube", an RMITV produced comedy variety show on Melbourne's public station C31 Melbourne.

Liam and Chris also appeared on ABC-TV's "E-biz" program.

In 2003 The Gorskys "Adventures of Terrence and Spider:Professional Bouncers" was picked up for broadcast as interstitials on Foxtel's The Comedy Channel (Australia) throughout 2003–04.

== Music ==
The Gorskys always incorporated original and parody comedy songs into their live shows.

In 1999 the Gorskys released a tongue-in-cheek track entitled "New Millennium" which foretold the end of the world on 1 January 2000 (due to the millennium bug). The groups' website crashed on 12 September 2001 (the day after the 9/11 terrorist attacks on New York) when panicked googlers discovered the lyrics page for "New Millennium" which included references to "planes falling out of the sky" and "stock market crash".

"New Millennium" was released with 4 other tracks on the album "Licence to Fish".
