= Surprise Surprise (Australian TV series) =

- Genre: Practical joke
- Presented by: Jay Laga'aia
- Country of origin: Australia
- Original language: English
- No. of seasons: 1
- No. of episodes: 10

Production
- Running time: 60 minutes (inc. commercials)

Original release
- Network: Nine Network
- Release: 2000 – 2001

Related
- Surprise Surprise

Surprise Surprise is an Australian hidden camera practical joke television series hosted by Jay Laga'aia. The series commenced on the Nine Network in 2000 and ended in 2001. The series sets up people to fall prey to elaborate practical jokes with various roles played by Livinia Nixon, Ed Phillips and Michael Clohesy.

A celebrity version known as Surprise Surprise Gotcha was produced in 2007 with Matt Tilley and Jackie O.
