= Chrissie & Jane =

- Genre: Comedy
- Running time: 180 minutes
- Country of origin: Australia
- Language: English
- Home station: Mix 101.1 Melbourne
- Hosted by: Chrissie Swan; Jane Hall; Brendon Dangar (Whippy)
- Original release: 6 February 2012 – 5 December 2014
- Audio format: Stereo
- Website: Chrissie & Jane

Chrissie & Jane was an Australian breakfast radio show with Chrissie Swan & Jane Hall with anchor Brendon Dangar (Whippy). The show was broadcast on Mix 101.1 from 6 am to 9 am on weekdays and ran from February 2012 until December 2014.

News, sport, weather and traffic updates were presented by Emily Hoskins.

== History ==
In December 2011, Swan announced that she had resigned from The Circle to spend more time with her children, Leo & Kit. Chrissie was then offered to present Breakfast on Mix 101.1, replacing Brig & Lehmo, who moved to sister station Gold 104.3 to replace incumbents Grubby & Dee Dee.

In January 2012, actress and comedian Hall was announced as Swan's co-host with Jamie Row as anchor.

In March 2013, Swan went on maternity leave to have her third child and Katie 'Monty' Dimond replaced her. Chrissie returned to the show in April. In September, Jamie Row resigned as anchor of the show, moving into afternoons on the station. Row was replaced by program director, Brendon Dangar (Whippy), and is currently a floater at smoothfm 95.3 Sydney. In January 2014, the program celebrated 400 shows.

In March 2014, Chrissie & Jane introduced the "PI Case Files", a weekly segment whereby listeners can enlist the assistance of a private investigator. The private investigator was Online Investigations' Julia Robson.

In November 2014, Australian Radio Network announced that Mix 101.1 will rebrand as KIIS 101.1 in January 2015 with Chrissie Swan leaving the station. Matt Tilley will join Jane Hall to host a new breakfast show, Matt & Jane.

== Ratings ==
In May 2014, Chrissie & Jane finished Number 1 in the Melbourne FM radio ratings survey for the first time.
