= The Dan & Maz Show =

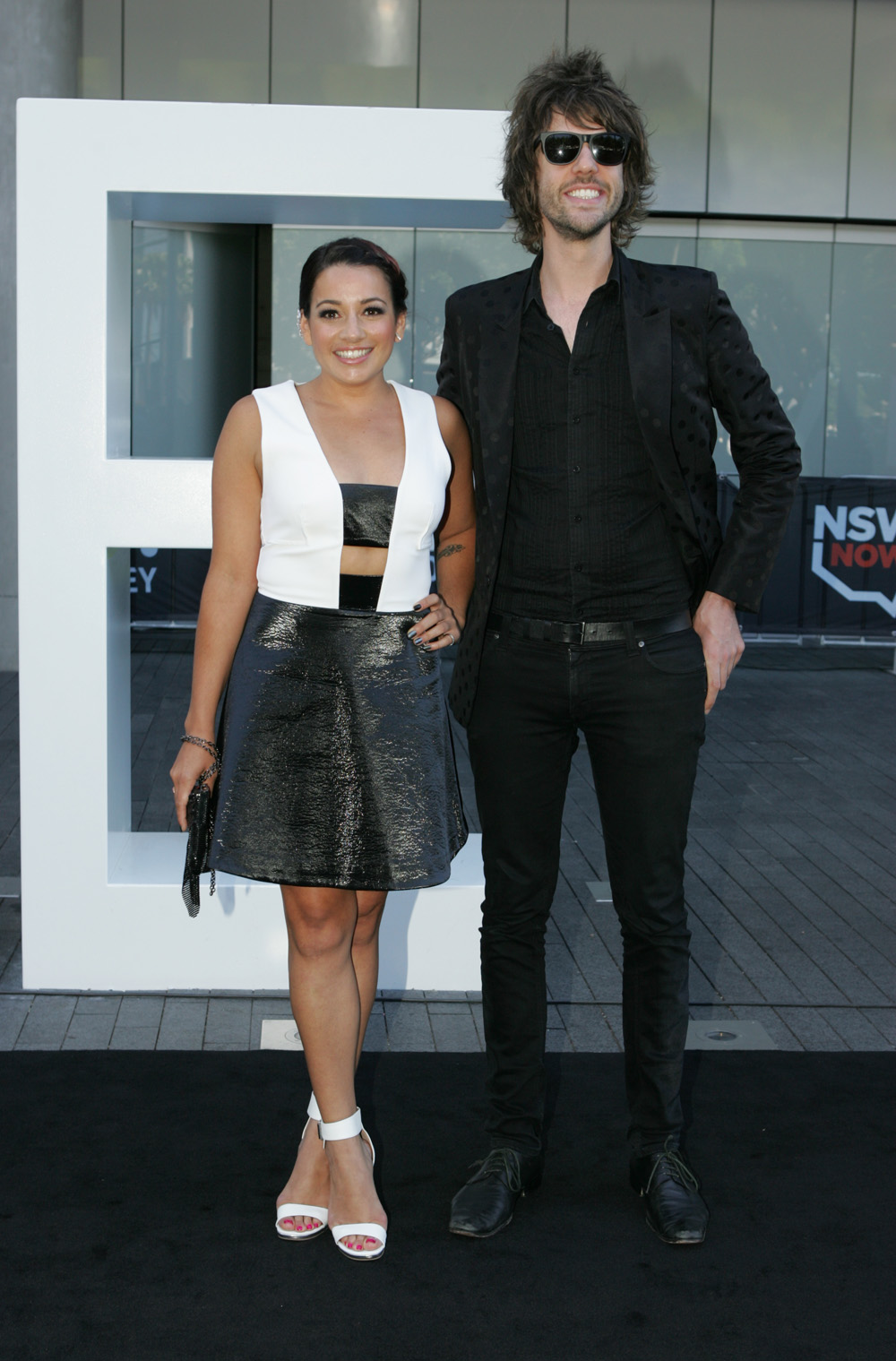
- Dan Debuf and Maz Compton in 2013
- Genre: Comedy
- Running time: 7 - 9am Weekends
- Country of origin: Australia
- Language: English
- Home station: 2Day FM
- Hosted by: Dan Debuf; Maz Compton
- Original release: January 2014 – December 2016
- Audio format: Stereo

The Dan & Maz Show was an Australian breakfast radio show with Dan Debuf and Maz Compton.

The show aired on weekend mornings from 7am until 9 am with music and daily topic discussions and special guests. It has previously aired as a breakfast show on 2DayFM in Sydney until October 2015 and a drive show across the Hit Network until June 2015.

== History ==
The show commenced in March 2013 as a night show from 6–8 pm on the Hit Network and Angus O'Loughlin from Shazam Top 20 was the anchor.

In December 2013, it was announced that Dan and Maz would replace Fifi and Jules with both Fifi Box and Jules Lund moving to other roles within the network. They also presented Summer Breakfast during December whilst the other breakfast shows were on holidays.

In October 2014, Southern Cross Austereo announced that Dan and Maz would replace Jules, Merrick and Sophie on 2Day FM. Hamish and Andy will return to the drive shift in July 2015. The breakfast show commenced on Wednesday 14 January 2015.

In October 2015, Southern Cross Austereo announced that Rove McManus and Sam Frost will join 2Day FM to host breakfast with Dan and Maz moving to Weekend Breakfast across the network. Dan and Maz hosted their last breakfast show on Friday 23 October 2015.

In December 2016, Dan and Maz announced their resignation from the Hit Network and will pursue careers outside of radio in 2017.

== Team ==
=== Dan Debuf ===
Dan Debuf attended high school at John XXIII College and was a law student at the University of Western Australia. During his time at university, Debuf joined the University of Western Australia Dramatic Society where he wrote comedic plays and started his career as a comedian. He was also one of many comedians, such as Claire Hooper and Tim Minchin, to launch their careers through the Big Hoo Haa improv comedy group.

In 2007 he made the move to Melbourne to continue his law degree at the University of Melbourne, but instead became involved in the comedy and radio scene. Since starting his radio career Debuf has twice been nominated for Best Comedy Segment (2009 and 2010) at the Australian Commercial Radio Awards and also appeared in Radio Today's "Top 20 Hot New FM Talent" listing for 2012.

Debuf spent two years co-hosting the Action Battle Team at Nova 919 Breakfast in Adelaide with Matt Saraceni. The show began in June 2007 as a mid-dawn program on Melbourne's Nova 100 station and was used as a fill-in program for the nights team from 7–10 pm for two weeks in November of that year. The program's fill-in role was such a success that the pair were offered the night show in Perth for Nova 937, which aired during 2008 and 2009. At the end of 2009, Maz Compton was asked to join the show.

Outside of his role as a radio presenter Debuf has taken to the stage at two Melbourne International Comedy Festivals and appeared at the Adelaide Fringe Festival in the sketch show Lords of Luxury, based on the comedy podcast of the same name which he both co-writes and performs in.

Debuf has also had a number of TV roles, appearing on Network Ten program The Project and working as a co-presenter on Channel V's The Music Lab.

=== Maz Compton ===
The entertainer began her radio career producing the M&R Show with Ian Dickson (Dicko) and Sophie Monk on Sydney's Nova 969 which led to her working as assistant producer for radio personalities Merrick and Rosso from 2001 to 2004.

In 2004, Compton was hired to co-host the Hot30 Countdown across the Austereo National Network. In 2004, she also joined MTV Australia as the host of Total Request Live (TRL) and spent the next five years hosting a number of other shows and events with the network including Full Tank Texas and Las Vegas, MTV & Billabong's Backdoor to J-Bay, Maz's Mexican Vacation which included the MTV Video Music Awards Latin America, and TRL European Vacation which included the MTV Europe Music Awards (Italy). Back in Australia she presented MTV Australia's ARIA Red Carpet Specials in both 2005 and 2006, and was nominated at the 2006 Dolly (magazine) Teen Choice Awards for 'Raddest VJ in the Country.'

In 2008, she moved back to Nova 969 where she took up a permanent residency as one half of Launchpad, the Nova Nights slot she hosted alongside James Kerley.

Off air Compton has also worked as a motivational public speaker, appearing on stage at Wave Aid 2005 and acting as the Australian MTV spokesperson for World AIDS Day and the Starlight Foundation. In 2008, Compton was also recognised as the Most Popular Female Personality at the Astra Awards. The year 2008 also saw Compton host the Girlfriend Magazine model search roadshow around Australia which took her to Sydney, Melbourne, Adelaide, Brisbane and Perth in search of the next 'It' girl. She also hosted the Dolly Teen Choice Awards alongside Brian McFadden in the same year. Before starting with MTV Australia, Compton also briefly appeared as a teen actor in the Australian television series Heartbreak High, Breakers and The Genie from Down Under. She is now a regular on Channel 7's The Morning Show and Weekend Sunrise.
