= Cereal Pest: Gotcha Calls – The Double Album =

Cereal Pest: Gotcha Calls - The Double Album

Studio album by Matt Tilley
- Released: October 21, 2006
- Genre: Comedy

Matt Tilley chronology
Cereal Pest: The Gotcha Calls (2005)	Cereal Pest: Gotcha Calls - The Double Album (2006)	Cereal Pest: Gotcha Calls - Three's a Crowd (2007)

Cereal Pest: Gotcha Calls – The Double Album is the second album from prank call specialist Matt Tilley. Once again, the tracks are taken from his radio show. It was certified Gold by ARIA.

== Track listing ==
=== Disc 1 ===
1. "Bull's Testicles"
2. "The Big Woofer"
3. "Poofters and Legends"
4. "Corroboree"
5. "Gooood Vibrations"
6. "Tit for Tatt"
7. "Who's Your Daddy?"
8. "Me Love You Long Time"
9. "Dog of a Day"
10. "I Ain't No Queen"
11. "Cheap Dad"
12. "The Old HJ"
13. "The Couple Does it Doggy"
14. "My Pee Pee is Stuck"
15. "Running Out of Lies"

=== Disc 2 ===
1. "The Epic"
2. "The Tourette's Call"
3. "Completely Legless"
4. "Choke the Chicken"
5. "Scoopy Scoop"
6. "Swearing Granny #1"
7. "Swearing Granny Strikes Again"
8. "Desperate Housewife"
9. "Oh... What a Feeling"
10. "A Tranny on the Wireless"
11. "Hit and Run"
12. "My Big Fat Greek Wedding Tantrum"
13. "Sorry"
14. "The Lost Flock"

== Charts ==
Chart performance for Cereal Pest: Gotcha Calls – The Double Album
Chart (2006)	Peak position
Australian Albums (ARIA)	4

== Certifications ==
Certifications for Cereal Pest: Gotcha Calls – The Double Album
Region	Certification	Certified units/sales
Australia (ARIA)	Gold	35,000^{^}
^{^} Shipments figures based on certification alone.
