= You May Be Right (game show) =

- Presented by: Todd McKenney
- Country of origin: Australia

Production
- Running time: 60 minutes per episode (inc. commercials)

Original release
- Network: Seven Network
- Release: 13 August – 3 September 2006

You May Be Right is an Australian television game show, jointly produced by dSP Beyond and the Seven Network, and hosted by Dancing with the Stars judge Todd McKenney. The show was aired on Sunday nights at 7:30pm and premiered on 13 August 2006. The format pitted two teams of Australian celebrities against each other, testing their knowledge on movies, music and television. Among the games involved are: Check It Out, Crate Expectations, Face Race, Looney Tunes, Slay That Song and What Happened Next. The show's in-house band was the Scared Weird Little Guys. The original working title for the pilot was Famous, but was later changed to its current title. The show was based on the Swedish concept Doobidoo.

== Criticism ==
The show was heavily criticised for its obvious similarities to the ABC's Spicks and Specks:

Diary has not heard a good word about Sunday night's premiere of You May be Right on Seven. Hosted by Todd McKenney, the panel show looked cheap and was not a patch on the ABC's Spicks and Specks on which it was based. On ABC radio in Sydney callers were outraged that Seven had pinched the show from Aunty.

On one of the first episodes of Spicks and Specks taped after You May Be Right's cancellation, host Adam Hills introduced the show by saying "Welcome to Spicks and Specks, the music quiz show that may be right."

== Production problems ==
Seven bosses ordered a major overhaul, including new sets and lighting, after the first show was plagued by embarrassing production problems. It took over four hours to tape the first one-hour show, due to various technical problems, faulty buzzers, over-running segments, and host Todd McKenney's repeated flubbing of his teleprompted lines. Ten episodes were originally planned, but after declining ratings the show was cancelled within a month of being on air.

== See also ==
- Big Questions
