= Yasmin's Getting Married =

Australian reality television program

- Directed by: Phil Cullen
- Presented by: Jo Stanley
- Starring: Ryan Phelan; Christine Chinchen; Matthew Hardy; Contestant; Yasmin Dale
- Country of origin: Australia
- No. of episodes: 4

Production
- Executive producers: Cathie Scott; Dafydd Williams; Des Monaghan; Karen Willing
- Running time: 30 minutes per episode (inc. commercials)
- Production companies: Screentime; Network Ten

Original release
- Network: Network Ten
- Release: 1 August – 4 August 2006

Yasmin's Getting Married is an Australian reality television series that aired live on Network Ten in early August 2006. It was based on the successful Scandinavian show Kerry's Getting Married, which revolves around a single woman's quest to find a partner and get married. It was produced by Screentime, which purchased the format from Strix Television.

The show debuted on Tuesday, 1 August 2006, and was hosted by Jo Stanley from FOX FM Melbourne. She was also joined by Ryan Phelan, anchor of Sports Tonight, and Christine Chinchen, a relationship counsellor. Guests included comedian Matt Hardy, wedding planner Kathy Apostolidis, and Bree Amer.

The show's theme song was a cover of Dusty Springfield's "Wishin' and Hopin'", sung by Neighbours star Stephanie McIntosh. The track appears on her album Tightrope.

== Overview ==
=== The Bride ===
Yasmin Dale, a 29-year-old recruitment manager, was the star contestant in the show. Her goal during the series was to find a groom during the nine-week run of the show and marry him in a wedding broadcast live on Channel Ten at the end of the series.

Dale was not the original subject of the show. The original bride was a woman named Rene, and the show was subsequently originally titled and advertised as Rene's Getting Married. However, the original contestant pulled out of the show and pursued a relationship independent of the program two weeks before the premiere of the series, thus facilitating the need for a title and contestant change.

=== The potential grooms ===
On the first episode, viewers were introduced to the first six candidates to be Yasmin's husband: Vincent, Adam, Athan, Max, Peter and Deryn. At the end of the first episode the panel of "experts" had whittled the number down to three: Vincent, Peter and Deryn. Viewers were then given around 24 hours to vote to decide which of these three would receive the honour of a date with Yasmin.

In the second episode, Vincent was the first of the three to be eliminated. Later, Peter was chosen as the lucky man.

== Cancellation ==
The program was axed by Network Ten on Sunday, 6 August 2006, just four episodes into its projected nine-week run.

Network Ten's chief programming officer, David Mott, said that "Ten has a reputation for taking risks with new formats, as evidenced by our success with The Biggest Loser, Thank God You're Here and The Wedge—to name just three hits we've launched this year. While we all had very high hopes for Yasmin's Getting Married, it is clear at this early stage that our audience has not embraced this bold new initiative. We have therefore elected to cease production on the Screentime-produced reality program and move on."

A statement from the network cites disappointing ratings as the primary reason for the cancellation. Network Ten and Screentime have indicated that Yasmin will have to find the love of her life by more conventional means, although they will assist her with the costs of the wedding. As of now, Yasmin is still waiting for her chance to finally walk down the aisle.

The show was replaced with episodes of Futurama in the same 7 p.m. timeslot.

=== Legacy ===
The show was sometimes a target in the first series of The Chaser's War On Everything, when they created a bogus reality TV show called Chasmin's Getting Married. They also purported that the 2006 Census showed that "100% of people don't want to marry Yasmin." Also they did a parody in the popular segment "In Other News", which included Chas Licciardello in a wedding dress running through Sydney trying to find a man, in all the wrong places.
