= Cereal Pest: Gotcha Calls – Three's a Crowd =

Cereal Pest: Gotcha Calls - Three's a Crowd

Studio album by Matt Tilley
- Released: 10 November 2007
- Genre: Comedy

Matt Tilley chronology
Cereal Pest: Gotcha Calls - The Double Album (2006)	Cereal Pest: Gotcha Calls - Three's a Crowd (2007)	Gotcha Calls - The Final Call (2009)

Three's a Crowd is an album from Matt Tilley. Released November 10, 2007, it takes prank calls from his radio show into CD format. It was certified Gold by ARIA.

== Track listing ==
=== Disc 1 ===
1. "The Lolliop Lady" - (5:21)
2. "The Political Party Dudes" - (6:14)
3. "Say It Don't Spray It" - (6:58)
4. "Air Marshall Addis" - (5:42)
5. "Cry Baby" - (4:38)
6. "Someone Goes Bang!" - (4:54)
7. "Restaurant Runner" - (7:19)
8. "Superfan" - (5:18)
9. "Taken For A (Bus) Ride" - (6:05)
10. "Stolen Property" - (5:02)
11. "Dwarf Throwing" - (5:25)
12. "You Dumb Mother" - (3:15)
13. "Barnesy Bribes Blue Boys" - (5:58)
14. "I Am Not A Horse" - (5:35)

=== Disc 2 ===
1. "(Meet Arjib & Cecil)" - (0:20)
2. "Servicing A Customer" - (6:02)
3. "Flu Shots" - (11:38)
4. "The Censorship Chook" - (3:12)
5. "The Naked Truth" - (7:13)
6. "I'm Hearing Voices" - (8:34)
7. "C Is For Colnoscopy" - (5:23)
8. "The House Of Troy (again)" - (6:18)
9. "Dead And Buried" - (5:23)
10. "Heartless" - (5:20)
11. "What Goes Bang" - (8:14)
12. "Flushed With Success" - (4:59)
13. "The Blue Danube Waltz" - (2:23)

== Charts ==
Chart performance for Cereal Pest: Gotcha Calls – Three's a Crowd
Chart (2007)	Peak position
Australian Albums (ARIA)	14

== Certifications ==
Certifications for Cereal Pest: Gotcha Calls – Three's a Crowd
Region	Certification	Certified units/sales
Australia (ARIA)	Gold	35,000^{^}
^{^} Shipments figures based on certification alone.
