= Fifi Box =

Australian radio broadcaster and television presenter

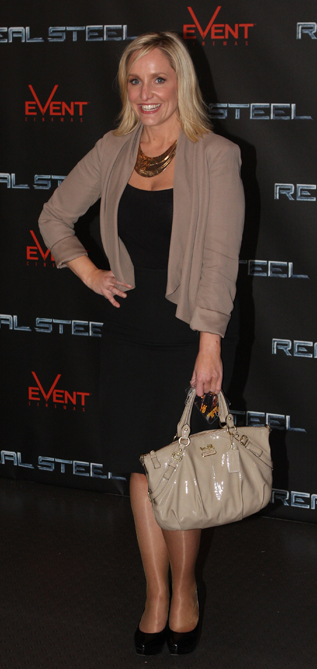
- Box in September 2011
- Born: 1977 (age 48–49); Melbourne, Victoria, Australia
- Education: Tintern Grammar
- Children: 2
- Presenting career
- Show: Fifi, Fev & Nick on Fox FM Melbourne
- Stations: Fox FM Melbourne; Hit Network
- Time slot: Monday–Friday 6 am–9 am
- Country: Australia
- Previous shows: Fifi and Jules on Today Network; The Shebang on Triple M
- Website: www.fox.com.au/shows/fifi-dave

Fiona Box is an Australian radio broadcaster, television presenter and actress.

== Career ==
=== Radio ===
Box's early career was spent in regional Australia working at stations 2MC/ROXFM Port Macquarie, 3TR Traralgon and 3GG Warragul.

Between 2003 and 2008 Box co-hosted The Shebang; a radio show broadcast weekday mornings from 6 am to 9 am AEST in Sydney, Australia, on Triple M. It was hosted by Box and Marty Sheargold with Anthony Maroon as the show anchor.

In November 2010, it was announced that Box would join Jules Lund as a co-host on Fifi and Jules across the Today Network leaving Friday's show open for Hamish and Andy to do their show. The show started in February 2011.

In November 2013, Box announced that she was going to co-host Fifi & Dave with Dave Thornton on Fox FM in 2014, replacing Jo Stanley and Matt Tilley. In 2016, Brendan Fevola joined the show, and it was renamed Fifi, Dave and Fev. In January 2017, anchor Byron Cooke was added to the title of the show and it was renamed Fifi, Dave, Fev & Byron. Dave Thornton resigned from the show in September 2017 and the show was renamed to Fifi, Fev & Byron. In December 2020, Byron Cooke resigned from the show and was replaced by Nick Cody in January 2021. The show was renamed Fifi, Fev & Nick.

=== Television ===
Box is known on television for her "standout" performance on Dancing with the Stars on the Seven Network in 2007 and guest appearances on Sunrise, The Project, Thank God You're Here and Have You Been Paying Attention?

In January 2009, Box joined Sunrise as weather presenter, where she replaced David Brown and stayed in this position until December 2009. In January 2010, she was appointed entertainment editor, where she conducted celebrity interviews and presented entertainment-related segments.

Box joined the cast of Neighbours in July 2016 as Brooke Butler. She made her debut on the show on 28 September 2016 and left in late November; her character returned in April 2017.

In February 2021, Box announced that she will be a contestant on Dancing with the Stars: All Stars on the Seven Network. She was eliminated first on 11 April 2021.

== Personal life ==
Box was raised in the outer eastern suburbs of Melbourne, Australia. She attended Tintern Grammar in Ringwood East, and she was appointed school captain in her final year (1993). Box often returns to Tintern to speak with current students. Her brother is Augie March's keyboardist Kiernan Box.

On 19 November 2012, Box announced on live radio via her radio show Fifi and Jules that she was pregnant. On 17 December, it was reported that Grant Kenny was the father. In 2013, Box gave birth to a daughter.

On 10 February 2019, Box announced on Instagram, and later that week on The Project, that she was expecting a second child via IVF. Later that year, she gave birth to her second daughter.

In February 2022, Box was announced as a Moomba Monarch alongside Peter Hitchener.

Media offices
Preceded by Nuala Hafner	Sunrise; Entertainment editor January 2010 – December 2012	Succeeded by Nelson Aspen
Preceded by David Brown	Sunrise; Weather presenter January 2009 – December 2009	Succeeded by Grant Denyer
