= Jane Hall (actress) =

Australian actress and comedienne

- Born: 20 January 1971 (age 55); Hamilton, Victoria, Australia
- Occupations: Actress; comedian; writer; presenter
- Years active: 1985–present
- Spouse: Vince Colosimo (1996–2007)
- Children: 1

Jane Hall is an Australian actress, comedian, writer and presenter. She is known for originating the role of Rebecca Fisher in the television soap opera Home and Away, and for her leading roles in All Together Now as Anna Sumner, A Country Practice as Jess Morrison, and Neighbours as Rebecca Napier. In 2019, she played Ann Reynolds in Wentworth. Hall has also presented a number of radio shows.

== Early life ==
Born in Hamilton, Victoria, Hall grew up in the Dandenong Ranges. She attended Tecoma Primary School, Belgrave South Primary School and Upwey High School. Hall studied drama at MBCTA Youth Theatre and at high school she appeared in high school productions.

== Career ==
A child actress, Hall began her acting career in 1985, with a guest role in the television series The Henderson Kids. She performed in school productions at Belgrave South Primary School and also appeared in amateur High School productions.

In 1989, Hall played Rebecca Fisher in the television soap opera Home and Away. Hall reached large audiences through her long running role in situation comedy series All Together Now, which also starred Jon English, Rebecca Gibney and Steven Jacobs. Hall played Anna Sumner, a twin who finds out her real father is a 1970s rock star living in the past. The program focused on the comedy situations in dealing with this discovery and her father's eccentric personality. In early 1994, Hall and Vince Colosimo were cast in leading roles in the new season of A Country Practice, which moved from Seven Network to Network Ten. Hall was cast as vet Jess Morrison, who is several years older than herself. Hall called her character "very strong and independent, and animals are her life." Hall previously regularly filled in for Kate Langbroek on Nova 100's breakfast show Hughesy, Kate & Dave, while Langbroek was on maternity leave..

In mid-2007 Hall joined the cast of soap opera Neighbours as Rebecca Napier. On 10 October 2010 it was announced that Hall had resigned and she left in 2011. Of her departure, Hall said "I've decided it's time to say 'au revoir' to Erinsborough. It's sad to be leaving… but I'm looking forward to the future and new and exciting acting adventures." In October 2013 it was announced that Hall would be reprising the role of Rebecca on Neighbours for a four-week guest stint. Filming took place in November 2013 and aired in Australia in February 2014, and March 2014 in the UK. . In August 2019 it was announced that Hall would once again reprise her role of Rebecca for a guest stint later in the year.

In January 2012, it was announced that she would be presenting Chrissie & Jane on Mix 1011 with Chrissie Swan and Jamie Row. In August 2012, Hall replaced Yumi Stynes co-hosting the 3PM Pick-Up on Mix 1011 with Swan. After Swan was axed, it was announced that Hall would take over the breakfast radio show Matt & Jane with Matt Tilley on the rebranded KIIS 101.1

In October 2015, Hall announced that she would leave KIIS 101.1 at the end of the year to return to acting. She joined the cast of local prison drama Wentworth in 2019 as General Manager Ann Reynolds. Hall was one of four legacy characters that were part of Wentworth's final season. Ann Reynolds was originally in Prisoner played by Gerda Nicolson. Hall put her career to be a midwife on hold to be a part of Wentworth.

In 2023 Hall appeared in Foxtel travel series Luxury Escapes, where she and Miguel Maestre travelled to Dubai. Hall returned for series 2.

In 2024, Hall joined Chrissie Swan for Swan's new podcast series as a recurring guest, reuniting with Swan after several years. The two during the podcast spoke on a matter of topics . On 22 August 2024, Hall was cast in the short film For My Mother which was released in 2025.

In December 2025, Hall had completed placement for her midwifery course.

== Personal life ==
Hall has a daughter with her former husband, Australian actor Vince Colosimo, whom she met on the set of A Country Practice. Hall moved out of the couple's former home in Northcote, Victoria in January 2007.

== Filmography ==
=== Film ===
| Year | Title | Role | Notes |
|---|---|---|---|
| 1988 | The Four Minute Mile | Sue Landy | TV movie |
| 1997 | Kangaroo Palace | Sue | TV movie |
| 1997 | One Way Ticket | Kate Stark | TV movie |
| 1998 | Dead Letter Office | Heather | Feature film |
| 1999 | The Craic | Alice | Feature film |
| 1999 | Witch Hunt | Reporter No 1 | TV movie |
| 2000 | Rip Girls | Arlene | Feature film |
| 2001 | Finding Home | Gina | TV movie |
| 2002 | The Nugget | Lucy | Feature film |
| 2003 | Code 11-14 | FA Allison Wilson | TV movie |
| 2005 | Life | Rachel Cardamone | TV movie |
| 2007 | Razzle Dazzle: A Journey Into Dance | Miss Elizabeth | Feature film |
| 2025 | For My Mother | Mother | Short film |

=== Television ===
| Year | Title | Role | Notes | Ref |
|---|---|---|---|---|
| 1981 | Fantasy Island | Liz Blake (age 5) | TV series, episode: "Elizabeth's Baby / The Artist and the Lady" | |
| 1985 | The Henderson Kids | Regina Powell (recurring role) | TV series | |
| 1986 | Prime Time | Sandy Lockhart | TV series | |
| 1988 | House Rules | Pepe | TV series | |
| 1989 | Home and Away | Rebecca Fisher (recurring role) | TV series | |
| 1991–1993 | All Together Now | Anna Sumner (main cast) | TV series | |
| 1994 | A Country Practice | Jess Morrision | TV series, 30 episodes | |
| 1994 | Blue Heelers | Ms Haley | TV series, episode: "Domino Effect" | |
| 1997 | Good Guys, Bad Guys | Allie Andrews | TV series, 1 episode | |
| 1997 | Get a Life | Sophie | TV series | |
| 1999 | Crash Zone | Kim Clark | TV series, 1 episode | |
| 1999 | Halifax f.p. | Linda Ellis | TV series, 1 episode | |
| 1999 | High Flyers | Caz | TV series, 26 episodes | |
| 2001 | Blue Heelers | Penny Beck | TV series, episode: "Who Can You Trust?" | |
| 2002 | Something in the Air | Janine Baker | TV series, 2 episodes | |
| 2002 | Shock Jock | Megan | TV series, 1 episode | |
| 2002 | The Secret Life of Us | Vivienne | TV series, 1 episode | |
| 2002 | Short Cuts | PC Demmler | TV series, 2 episodes | |
| 2002 | Marshall Law | Prue Stanley | TV series, 2 episodes | |
| 2005 | Let Loose Live | Various | TV series, 2 episodes | |
| 2007 | The Starter Wife | Sharon | TV series, 3 episodes | |
| 2007–2011, 2014, 2019 | Neighbours | Rebecca Napier (main cast) | TV series | |
| 2012 | House Husbands | Sarah | TV series, 1 episode | |
| 2017 | Newton's Law | Jackie Russo | TV series, 8 episodes | |
| 2017 | True Story with Hamish & Andy | Flight Attendant | TV series, 1 episode | |
| 2017 | Sisters | Natasha Crane | TV series, 1 episode | |
| 2020 | Halifax: Retribution | News Anchor | TV series, 1 episode | |
| 2020–2021 | Wentworth | Ann Reynolds | TV series, 18 episodes | |
| 2021 | Frayed | Sandy McIntyre | TV series, 5 episodes | |
| 2021, 2023 | Bluey | Rusty's Mum (voice) | TV series, 2 episodes | |
| 2024 | Apples Never Fall | Debbie Christos | TV series; 3 episodes | |

=== Other appearances ===
| Year | Title | Role | Notes |
|---|---|---|---|
| 2024 | The Chrissie Cast | Self | Podcast series (regular guest) |
| 2023–present | Luxury Escapes | Self | TV series: 2 episodes |
| 2022 | This Is Your Life: Rebecca Gibney | Self | TV series, 1 episode |
| 2021 | Wentworth Unlocked | Self | TV special |
| 2020 | Wentworth: Behind the Bars 2 | Self | TV special |
| 2019–2020 | Escape from the City | Narrator/ host | TV series |
