= Jules Lund =

Australian television and radio broadcaster (born 1979)

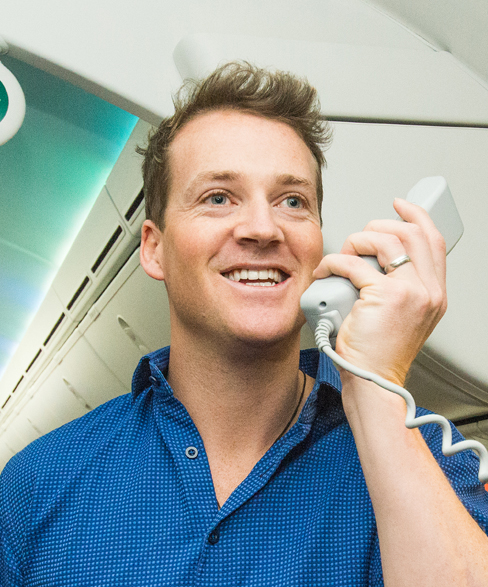
- Born: Jules Lund; 24 April 1979 (age 47); Melbourne, Australia
- Presenting career
- Station: Hit Network
- Previous shows: Fifi & Jules; Jules, Merrick and Sophie

Jules Lund (born 24 April 1979) is an Australian television presenter from Melbourne.

== Early life ==
Lund was born in Melbourne in 1979, where he attended De La Salle College, Malvern. Lund studied Graphic Design, Photography and Film before winning the FOX FM Radio's '15 Days of Fame' competition in 2001. The show was presented by Matt Tilley and Tracy Bartram and helped launch Lund's career.

== Family and personal life ==
Lund and his wife Anna married in 2009. They have two daughters Billie (born 2010) and Indigo (born 2012).

== Career ==
In 2004, he became a presenter on the Nine Network show Getaway and appeared in almost 400 episodes before leaving in 2012.

He hosted the Logies red carpet arrivals for ten years from 2006. In July 2006, Lund appeared in the Nine Network's Torvill and Dean's Dancing on Ice and was partnered with professional ice skater Kristina Cousins. He was 5th eliminated in the competition. In October, he also appeared on a panel discussion show named Big Questions. In 2008, he hosted a short-lived game show Hole in the Wall and in 2009 a short-lived reality show called Australia's Perfect Couple. In July 2009, he filled in for Richard Wilkins on Today while Wilkins was on holidays.

In December 2007, Lund along with Ryan Shelton and Tamsyn Lewis presented Summer Fling, a breakfast show across the Austereo Today Network.

In February 2011, Lund and Fifi Box started hosting Fifi and Jules across the Today Network leaving Friday's show open for Hamish and Andy to do their show. In 2014, Lund co-hosted the breakfast show Jules, Merrick and Sophie on 2Day FM.

In October 2014, Southern Cross Austereo announced that Jules, Merrick & Sophie on 2Day FM would be axed due to poor ratings throughout the year and replaced by The Dan & Maz Show.

In January 2015, Emma Freedman and Lund were announced as hosts of The Scoopla Show, an entertainment news segment which was cancelled in February 2016 by the Hit Network.

In September 2015, Lund launched TR|BE, an influencer marketing platform.

== Other projects ==
In 2001, Lund appeared on "Street Talk" with Sam Newman on The AFL Footy Show. Lund appeared in a pair of bathers and bra speaking to Sam about his "squirrel".

In 2010, Lund produced the documentary Every Heart Beats True: The Jim Stynes Story. The film documented Lund's good friend and mentor Jim Stynes' life and his battle with cancer. Lund met Stynes through his involvement with The Reach Foundation, and Stynes was Lund's groomsman at his wedding. When Stynes was diagnosed with cancer, Lund found Stynes so compelling and inspiring that he captured moments on his handy-cam throughout his battle. The footage illustrates their deep bond and is used throughout the documentary.

== Filmography ==
=== Film ===
| Year | Title | Role | Notes |
|---|---|---|---|
| 2010 | Every Heart Beats True: The Jim Stynes Story | Himself, Producer, Camera Man | TV Movie Documentary |

=== Radio ===
| Year | Program | Station | Notes |
|---|---|---|---|
| 2007 | Summer Fling | Austero Today Network | Breakfast Show |
| 2011–2013 | Fifi and Jules | Austero Today Network | Drive Shift Radio |
| 2014 | Jules, Merrick and Sophie | Austero Today Network | Breakfast Show |
| 2015 | The Scoopla Show with Jules Lund and Emma Freedman | Austero Today Network | Entertainment News Segment |

=== Television ===
| Year | Title | Role | Notes |
|---|---|---|---|
| 2004–2012 | Getaway | Reporter/Presenter | TV Series |
| 2012 | Voices Reaching Out | Reporter | A one-off televised benefit concert by the Nine Network in aid of the Reach Foundation |
| 2005–2011 | Adults Only 20 to 1 | Himself | TV Series Documentary |
| 2009 | Today | Guest Reporter | Breakfast TV Series |
| 2009 | Australia's Perfect Couple | Host | Reality TV Series |
| 2009 | Australia Unites: The Victorian Bushfire Appeal | Himself | Live Telethon to help raise funds for the victims of Victoria's bushfire disaster in February 2009 |
| 2008 | Hole In The Wall | Host | TV Series |
| 2005–2007 | Postcards | Guest Reporter | TV Series |
| 2006 | Big Questions | Host | TV Series |
| 2006 | Torvill & Dean's Dancing on Ice | Himself | TV Series |
| 2005–2006 | Australia's Funniest Home Videos | Roving Reporter | TV Series |
| 2006–2015 | TV Week Logie Awards | Reporter | TV special |
