= Brendan Fevola =

Australian rules footballer, born 1981

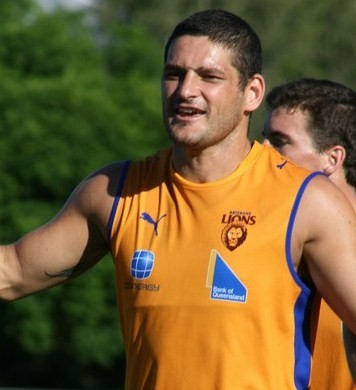
- Fevola with the Brisbane Lions in January 2010

Personal information
- Full name: Brendan Fevola
- Nicknames: Fev, The Shag, Fevalenko, The Fevolution
- Born: 20 January 1981 (age 45)
- Original team: Dandenong Stingrays (TAC Cup)
- Draft: No. 38, 1998 National Draft, Carlton
- Height: 191 cm (6 ft 3 in)
- Weight: 100 kg (220 lb)
- Position: Forward

Playing career^{1}
Years	Club	Games (Goals)
1999–2009	Carlton	187 (575)
2010	Brisbane Lions	17 (48)
Total		204 (623)

Representative team honours
Years	Team	Games (Goals)
2008	Victoria	1 (6)
- ^{1} Playing statistics correct to the end of 2011.

Career highlights
- 7x Carlton leading goalkicker: 2003–2009; 2x Coleman Medal: 2006, 2009; 3x All-Australian Team: 2006, 2008, 2009; Michael Tuck Medal: 2005; Carlton Football Club Hall of Fame inductee, 2024; Fox Footy Longest Kick winner: 2017

Brendan Fevola (born 20 January 1981) is a former professional Australian rules footballer. He played with the Carlton and Brisbane Lions football clubs in the Australian Football League (AFL).

Fevola is regarded as one of the most effective full-forwards to have played AFL in the 2000s, having won the Coleman Medal for league-leading goalkicker in 2006 and 2009 (kicking 84 and 86 goals, respectively) as well as All-Australian selection as a forward three times. His representative honours include playing for Victoria, where he was a leading goalkicker and was awarded the Allen Aylett Medal for being the state team's best player during the 2008 AFL Hall of Fame Tribute Match. During his career at Carlton, he was the club's leading goalkicker and key forward from 2003 until 2009. However, throughout his career, he was a controversial figure off the field, which ultimately led to him parting company with both of his AFL clubs.

== Early life ==
Brendan was born to Italian Australian Angelo Fevola, a Victorian state representative in lacrosse, and Karen Ralph on January 20, 1981. His parents split when he was eight years old. For a short time, he attended a Catholic school.

Fevola began playing football with the Beaconsfield Junior Football Club in the Dandenong & District Junior Football League before playing senior football in the Victorian Country Football League. His ability to kick goals for the Dandenong Stingrays earned him selection in the TAC Cup Team of the Year in 1998 and attracted the eye of recruiters; he was one of three talented AFL prospects featured in the 2000 television documentary The Draft, with the other draft prospects being Des Headland and Adam Ramanauskas.

== AFL career ==
=== Carlton ===
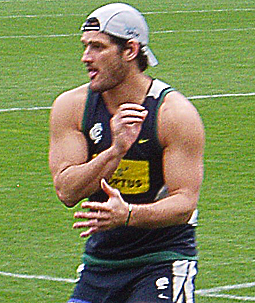
Fevola at Carlton training, November 2007.

Fevola was recruited to Carlton Football Club with selection No. 38 overall in the 1998 AFL draft and made his debut in the 1999 AFL season. Early in his career he showed signs of being a brilliant kick of the ball and a prospective key-position player at full-forward, and he led the AFL reserves for the 1999 season with 42 goals despite Carlton finishing last for the year. During a pre-season game on 31 December 1999 against Collingwood (promoted as the "Millennium Match"), he kicked 12 goals.

The promising talent was given the No. 25 guernsey made famous by Carlton legend Alex Jesaulenko.

However, Fevola struggled to maintain form over the next few years, playing in 39 games and kicking 66 goals between 2000 and 2002, with noticeably poor body language on-field as well as causing bad publicity through incidents off-field. Carlton Football club senior coach Wayne Brittain had intended to trade or delist Fevola at the end of the 2002 season; however, after Carlton's poor season (in which it won the wooden spoon) Brittain was himself sacked, and incoming senior coach Denis Pagan reversed Brittain's decision.

Pagan's arrival had an immediate impact on Fevola's discipline and form. In Round 5, 2003, Fevola kicked 8 goals against the Kangaroos, helping win the game for Carlton and launching himself into the eyes of AFL viewers. Fevola's unkempt dreadlocks and extroverted personality in the media earned him the nickname "The Shag" by fans.

Fevola's early goalkicking inconsistency saw him experiment with unorthodox styles of handling the ball in approach to taking set shots. In 2004, Fevola developed a ritualistic set-shot routine of taking three quick steps to shoot on goal, and this resulted in a significant increase in goal-kicking accuracy, particularly from long distance. The duration of his ritual, at times taking longer than a minute, became a point of contention, and was partially responsible for the introduction of a new rule in 2006 (commonly referred to as "the Lloyd Rule" after Essendon's Matthew Lloyd, who had a similarly lengthy set-shot ritual), limiting the duration permitted to take a set shot to 30 seconds, before play-on would be called. Fevola's ritual was duly shortened to accommodate the new rule.

In 2006, Fevola capped off a stunning year and his best to that point by kicking 84 goals and winning the Coleman Medal and All-Australian selection. He scored 59 goals in 2007, then followed this up in 2008 with his career-best total of 99 goals for the season, seeing him finish second behind Lance Franklin in the race for the Coleman Medal. He was selected for Victoria in the once-off AFL Hall of Fame Tribute Match in 2008, kicking six goals and winning the Allen Aylett Medal as best on ground.

In 2009, Fevola won his second Coleman Medal, kicking 86 goals for the season, eight goals clear of the runner-up Jonathan Brown. He was the first Carlton player ever to win the league's goalkicking award twice, and it was his seventh consecutive season as the club's leading goalkicker; only Stephen Kernahan (11) had won the award more times consecutively. He later sold the medal "to fund a gambling addiction."

Carlton announced on 30 September 2009 that it would seek a trade for Fevola during the 2009 trade week due to his off-field behaviour, most specifically due to antics at the 2009 Brownlow Medal Count. On 9 October, he was officially traded to the Brisbane Lions along with a second-round draft pick (#27 overall) in exchange for Brisbane's Lachlan Henderson and a first-round draft pick (#12 overall). Additionally, Carlton agreed to pay $100,000 of Fevola's salary for each of the two years remaining on his existing contract. Fevola left Carlton as a life member of the club after playing 187 senior games for 575 goals—the third-most goals by any player in Carlton Football Club history. Despite the circumstances of his departure, Carlton has stated that Fevola's life membership was not affected and that he remained welcome at the club.

=== Brisbane Lions ===
At Brisbane, Fevola was given the Number 5 guernsey. He made his debut for the Lions in the first round of the 2010 season at the Gabba against the West Coast Eagles. He finished the 2010 season with 48 goals in 17 games.

After further off-field controversy over the 2010/11 offseason, Fevola was sacked by the Lions on 20 February 2011.

== Post-AFL ==
On 6 April 2011, Fevola signed to play with the Casey Scorpions in the Victorian Football League in 2011. He kicked 63 goals during the home-and-away season, with 43 of those coming in the final six games of the season, to finish second behind Port Melbourne's Patrick Rose (67 goals) in the league goalkicking, and he kicked a further six goals in finals. His contract with the Scorpions was not renewed for 2012. He played six games for Waratah in the 2011/12 NTFL season, kicking 49 goals.

In 2012, Fevola signed to play home matches with Yarrawonga in the Ovens & Murray Football League. Interest in Fevola's presence was a significant financial boon for both Yarrawonga and the O&M in 2012, with an increase in attendances and gate takings across the league compared with previous seasons; such was Fevola's ability to draw a crowd that some rival clubs paid Fevola to play against them in Yarrawonga's away matches. Fevola remained at Yarrawonga for four seasons from 2012 until 2015, kicking 357 goals from 65 matches and being part of back-to-back premierships in 2012 and 2013. He was coach of the O&M's interleague representative team in 2014 and 2015, served as a playing co-coach of Yarrawonga in 2015, and he holds the record for most goals in a game at Yarrawonga, kicking 16 goals in a match in late 2014. After this, he played with Deer Park in the Western Region Football League in 2016, Melton South in the Ballarat Football League in 2017 and 2018, Hastings in the Mornington Peninsula Nepean Football League in 2019, and then again for Deer Park in 2021 (having also signed there for the 2020 season, which was cancelled due to the COVID-19 pandemic).

Throughout his post-AFL career, Fevola also played once-off matches for several local clubs around the country, earning appearance fees which the clubs financed by the large crowds he could draw. Among the clubs was former TANFL club New Norfolk, now in Tasmania's Southern Football League, where in 2012 he drew a record home crowd for the club and kicked eighteen goals to set a new club record; he returned for another game in 2013, this time kicking sixteen goals.

In 2017, Fevola won the Fox Footy Longest Kick competition with a kick of 66.1 metres (217 ft).

== Media career ==
Fevola was a regular panellist on The Footy Show on the Nine Network, and he was noted for his larrikin persona. His tenure as a panellist ended after his behaviour at the 2009 Brownlow Medal Count, the same event that led the end of his time at Carlton.

In April 2016, Fevola joined Fox FM to host Fifi, Dave, Fev & Byron with Fifi Box, Dave Thornton and Byron Cooke. Dave Thornton resigned from the show in September 2017, and the show was renamed to Fifi, Fev & Byron. In December 2020, Byron Cooke resigned from the show and was replaced by Nick Cody in January 2021. The show was renamed Fifi, Fev & Nick.

After gaining some weight following the years after his AFL retirement, he joined Jenny Craig and has become a TV ambassador for the brand as a result of his weight-loss efforts.

Fevola starred in the second season of I'm a Celebrity...Get Me Out of Here!, which he won and was crowned King of the Jungle. The prize for taking out the title was $100,000 to be donated to his chosen charity. Fevola decided to split the winnings evenly between his chosen charity, Shane Warne Foundation, and series runner-up Paul Harragon's chosen charity, Mark Hughes Foundation.

In 2023, Fevola competed as The Captain on the fifth season of The Masked Singer Australia. He was unmasked on the ninth episode, after his first performance.

== Personal life ==
Fevola married Alex Cheatham on 7 October 2005 at St John's Church in Toorak. Fevola has two daughters, Leni and Lulu, and is also stepfather to Mia (Cheatham's child from a previous relationship). In May 2018, Fevola announced on Fox FM's Fifi, Fev & Byron that wife Alex was pregnant with their third child.

On 12 December 2006, it was announced that they were separated after 14 months of marriage, amid allegations of Fevola's infidelity with an Australian model Lara Bingle. Cheatham stated in a Woman's Day interview that Fevola had become "disconnected" from her following the birth of Leni. Bingle later confessed to the five-week affair, claiming that being from Sydney, she did not know that Fevola was married until she heard his baby in the background during a phone conversation.

Fevola and Cheatham divorced in 2014; however, in 2016 it was announced that they were again engaged.

Fevola opened a restaurant, Fellini, in 2007 on Toorak Road, South Yarra. He sold the restaurant in 2010.

Fevola has been noted as studying criminology via correspondence at Griffith University and says that becoming a police officer is a possible career after football.

Fevola has been diagnosed with depression, and he underwent 51 days of extensive rehabilitation in 2011; both his agent and manager have associated many of Fevola's antics with his depression.

=== Controversies and legal issues ===
"When Fevola plumbed the depths, there were some who suggested it was like watching a train wreck. Yes, but a train designed by Norman Bel Geddes, a wreck choreographed by Merce Cunningham, and filmed by Guillermo del Toro."

— Chris McAuliffe

In 2001, he was involved in an attempted theft of jackets from a dry cleaner in North Melbourne; he was fined $8,000 by Carlton for the incident. On 8 March 2004, he was involved in an incident at Crown Casino; no charges were laid, but he was suspended by Carlton for a week. In 2006, Fevola assaulted a barman during a tour of Ireland in 2006 with the Australian International Rules team, and he was sent back to Australia. In March 2008, Fevola was fined $10,000 by the club and stood down from the leadership group after urinating on a window outside a Melbourne nightclub. After this incident, Carlton did not suspend or delist Fevola, saying that taking such action would not assist Fevola in addressing his problems, but he was put on his final warning.

In September 2009, Fevola was fined $10,000 and banned from appearing on the Grand Final Footy Show after behaving inappropriately at the 2009 Brownlow Medal count. Fevola withdrew from the traditional lap of honour by the Coleman Medallist at the 2009 AFL Grand Final and did not attend Carlton's awards night. As a result of the incident, he was traded to the Brisbane Lions, and he did not return as a panellist on The Footy Show in 2010.

On 2 March 2010, Lara Bingle started proceedings to sue Fevola for breach of privacy, defamation and misuse of her image for the release of a nude photo in Woman's Day released on 1 March 2010; however, on 9 April, Fevola was cleared of the charges against him. In September 2010, it was announced that Queensland police had launched a formal investigation into claims that Fevola had flashed a woman at a Brisbane park during a football clinic, but again there were no charges laid; the Brisbane Lions also suspended him independently while it conducted its own investigation into the event.

Early on 1 January 2011, New Year's Day, Fevola was arrested in Brisbane on charges of public nuisance and obstructing police. He was released on bail and was scheduled to appear in court on 18 January. The Brisbane Lions granted him indefinite leave before terminating his contract after receiving medical advice.

=== Gambling issues ===
In 2010, it became public that Fevola was addicted to gambling, mostly playing poker and punting on horses. He accumulated significant debts from gambling. In a paid interview with The Footy Show in early 2011, Fevola further discussed his addiction, revealing that he spent 65 days in rehabilitation, had lost almost a million dollars gambling, including $365,000 in one day of horse punting, and that his addiction almost drove him to suicide during Christmas 2010.

== Best career games ==
Fevola's best goalkicking haul in an AFL match was nine goals, scored for Carlton against Richmond in 2009. Prior to this, he had scored eight goals on eight occasions. In his one season with the Brisbane Lions, Fevola's highest tally was 5.2 (32).

Round	Year	Team	Opponent	Goals	Behinds
Round 15	2009	Carlton	Richmond	9	1
Round 12	2008	Carlton	Collingwood	8	6
Round 13	2004	Carlton	Richmond	8	5
Round 3	2008	Carlton	Essendon	8	4
Round 6	2009	Carlton	Hawthorn	8	4
Round 19	2006	Carlton	Hawthorn	8	3
Round 11	2009	Carlton	Brisbane	8	3
Round 3	2007	Carlton	Essendon	8	2
Round 5	2003	Carlton	North Melbourne	8	2

In AFL matches outside the premiership season, Fevola's best effort was a haul of twelve goals, scored for Carlton against Collingwood in the 2000 pre-season match known as the Millennium Match; and, he had two other eight-goal hauls in pre-season matches: the 2005 Wizard Cup grand final against West Coast, earning him the Michael Tuck Medal, and in the semi-final of the 2007 NAB Cup against North Melbourne. He scored hauls of eleven and ten goals in matches for Casey during the 2011 VFL season against Frankston and the Northern Bullants, respectively.

== Statistics ==
Legend
G	Goals	K	Kicks	D	Disposals	T	Tackles
B	Behinds	H	Handballs	M	Marks

Led the league for the season only
Led the league after finals only
Led the league after season and finals

Season	Team	No.	Games	Totals							Averages (per game)						
Season	Team	No.	Games	G	B	K	H	D	M	T	G	B	K	H	D	M	T
1999	Carlton	25	2	0	0	0	2	2	0	1	0.0	0.0	0.0	1.0	1.0	0.0	0.5
2000	Carlton	25	14	26	29	84	26	110	54	13	1.9	2.1	6.0	1.9	7.9	3.9	0.9
2001	Carlton	25	16	27	25	111	29	140	62	17	1.7	1.6	6.9	1.8	8.8	3.9	1.1
2002	Carlton	25	9	13	11	59	17	76	32	10	1.4	1.2	6.6	1.9	8.4	3.6	1.1
2003	Carlton	25	22	63	45	210	47	257	112	31	2.9	2.0	9.5	2.1	11.7	5.1	1.4
2004	Carlton	25	20	66	41	185	48	233	107	16	3.3	2.1	9.3	2.4	11.7	5.4	0.8
2005	Carlton	25	19	49	25	164	33	197	89	38	2.6	1.3	8.6	1.8	10.4	4.7	2.0
2006	Carlton	25	21	84	52	226	40	266	139	23	4.0	2.5	10.8	1.9	12.7	6.6	1.1
2007	Carlton	25	19	59	41	160	48	208	100	29	3.1	2.2	8.4	2.5	10.9	5.3	1.5
2008	Carlton	25	22	99	51	214	44	258	129	38	4.5	2.3	9.7	2.0	11.7	5.9	1.7
2009	Carlton	25	23	89	57	251	46	297	148	50	3.9	2.5	10.9	2.0	12.9	6.4	2.2
2010	Brisbane Lions	5	17	48	25	125	25	150	58	28	2.8	1.5	7.4	1.5	8.8	3.4	1.6
Career			204	623	402	1789	405	2194	1030	294	3.1	2.0	8.8	2.0	10.8	5.0	1.4

== Playing honours ==
- Michael Tuck Medal 2005
- Coleman Medal 2006, 2009
- All-Australian 2006, 2008, 2009
- Carlton leading goalkicker 2003, 2004, 2005, 2006, 2007, 2008, 2009
- 3rd-most Career Goals For Carlton – 575
- Carlton Football Club Hall of Fame inductees, 2024
- NAB Cup Premiership Player 2005, 2007
- Australian International Rules squad 2006 (did not play for disciplinary reasons)
- VFL/AFL Italian Team of the Century 2007
- Victorian State Representative in Hall of Fame Tribute Match
- Allen Aylett Medallist

== See also ==
- List of VFL/AFL players by ethnicity
