= Larry the Lawnmower =

- The program's logo
- Created by: Tim Faircloth
- Narrated by: Jay Laga'aia
- Composer: Brenton White
- Country of origin: Australia
- No. of seasons: 2
- No. of episodes: 195

Production
- Cinematography: Peter Borosh
- Editor: Keaton Stewart
- Running time: Approx 30 minutes

Original release
- Network: Seven Network
- Release: 9 December 2008 – 2010

Larry the Lawnmower is an Australian pre-schoolers program broadcast that airs on Seven Network in Australia. created by Tim Faircloth.

The series follows Larry the Lawnmower and his four friends Wheelie the Wheelbarrow, Rosie the Rake, Tangles the Hose and Flash the Spade and their adventures in the backyard. The program is narrated and all the characters are voiced by Jay Laga'aia.

The program premiered on 9 December 2008 at 11:00am. A second series began on 16 February 2009. On 21 May 2009 it was announced due to popular demand the series would be repeated. In December 2015, Larry the Lawnmower reruns aired on 7TWO until February or March 2016 before re-airing the reruns again in May 2017 and January 2018.
