= Jay Laga'aia =

New Zealand–Australian actor and singer (born 1963)

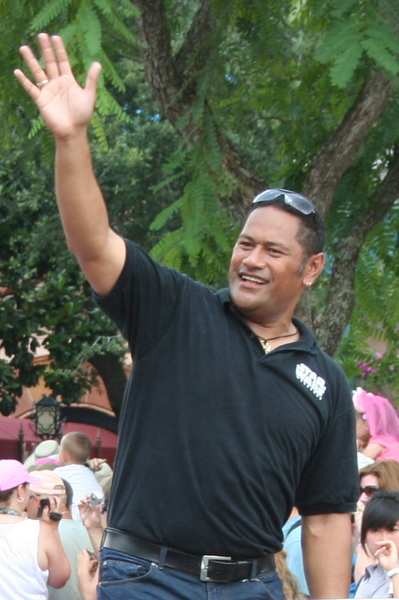
- Laga'aia in Florida, June 2009
- Born: 10 September 1963 (age 63); Auckland, New Zealand
- Occupation: Actor
- Years active: 1981–present
- Spouse: Sandie Jane Laga'aia (m. 1990)
- Children: 8; including Catherine

Jay Laga'aia (born 10 September 1963) is a New Zealand and Australian actor and musician. He is known internationally for his role as Captain Typho in the films Star Wars: Episode II – Attack of the Clones and Star Wars: Episode III – Revenge of the Sith.

Laga'aia is noted for his television roles, including Senior Constable Tommy Tavita in the Australian police drama Water Rats, lawyer David Silesi in the New Zealand legal drama Street Legal and Elijah Johnson in the long running Australian soap opera Home and Away.

He appeared in an Australian Children's TV Series called Jay's Jungle, which aired from 2015–2018. He was a regular feature on Australian kids program Play School.

== Life and career ==
Laga'aia was born and raised in Otara, South Auckland, New Zealand.

Laga'aia debuted as a musician in 1982 as a member of the Consorts, who released the Dalvanius Prime-produced single "Maoris on 45", which was one of the top selling singles in New Zealand that year.

Laga'aia is known for his part on Australian children's TV show Play School, and also for his role as Captain Typho in the films Star Wars: Episode II – Attack of the Clones and Star Wars: Episode III – Revenge of the Sith. He played the recurring role of Draco in three episodes of the television series Xena: Warrior Princess.

Laga'aia was a regular in Australian television shows Water Rats, Play School, Surprise Surprise, and a contestant on Celebrity Big Brother in 2002 and had a guest role as Gabriel in McLeod's Daughters. In New Zealand, he was the lead of the action series Street Legal. He is also known for his stage productions such as The Lion King. Laga'aia played the role of Judas in a 1994 production of Jesus Christ Superstar in New Zealand.

On 9 October 2007, Laga'aia released a children's album, Come Dance and Sing. On 24 December 2008, Laga'aia performed on Carols by Candlelight. Laga'aia narrated each of the characters on the children's show Larry the Lawnmower, which ran for 2 seasons starting in 2008. In November 2009, it was confirmed that Laga'aia had joined the cast of Australian soap opera Home and Away, as Reverend Elijah Johnson, until February 2012. Laga'aia released his second CD for children, I Can Play Anything, in August 2010.

In 2009 Laga'aia took on the role of Ambassador for the Touched by Olivia Foundation. In 2012 he was appointed as an Ambassador for kindergartens in Queensland.

In 2012 Laga'aia released two albums, a Christmas album entitled Christmas at Jay's Place and a nursery rhyme album called 10 in the Bed. He also provided the music for Scholastic's picture book Baby Elephant Walk.

He returned to the stage to play the role of The Wonderful Wizard of Oz in the 2013-14 New Zealand and Australia national tour of the acclaimed Broadway musical Wicked. In 2019, he was part of the Australian tour cast of Peter Pan Goes Wrong.

== Personal life ==
One of his younger brothers, Frank Laga'aia, was a member of the ARIA award-winning band Ilanda. In the early 2000s, he spent six months in Australia and six months in New Zealand, when Street Legal was in production.

Laga'aia has a son named Jeremy from a previous relationship. Additionally, since 1990, he has been married to Sandra Jane Laga'aia, one of the deputy principals at Sydney Secondary College Balmain Campus, with whom he has seven children. Their second-youngest child and daughter Catherine is a teen actress who was cast in June 2024 as the titular character in the 2026 live-action film Moana. Their second-eldest child and son Iosefa is an actor who has starred in many musical theatre productions, including the original Australian casts of Anastasia, Hamilton and Hadestown.

He is also a member of the international costuming group the 501st Legion as a member of the Terror Australis Garrison (Australia).

== Discography ==
=== Albums ===
List of albums, with Australian chart positions
Title	Album details	Peak chart positions
Title	Album details	AUS
Come Dance and Sing	Released: 2007; Format: CD; Label: ABC for Kids (R-301489-2)	—
Carnival of the Animals (with Justine Clarke & Georgie Parker)	Released: 2009; Format: 2×CD; Label: ABC Classics (ABC 476 3686)	—
I Can Play Anything	Released: 2010; Format: CD; Label: ABC for Kids (R-301558-2)	—
Ten in the Bed	Released: 2013; Format: CD; Label: ABC Music (3724803)	—
Christmas at Jay's Place	Released: 2013; Format: CD; Label: ABC for Kids (3752424)	—
Family Time	Released: 2014; Format: CD; Label: ABC for Kids (4071554)	—
Rumble, Rumble! Songs From the Jungle	Released: 2015; Format: CD; Label: ABC Music (4716422)	—

== Filmography ==
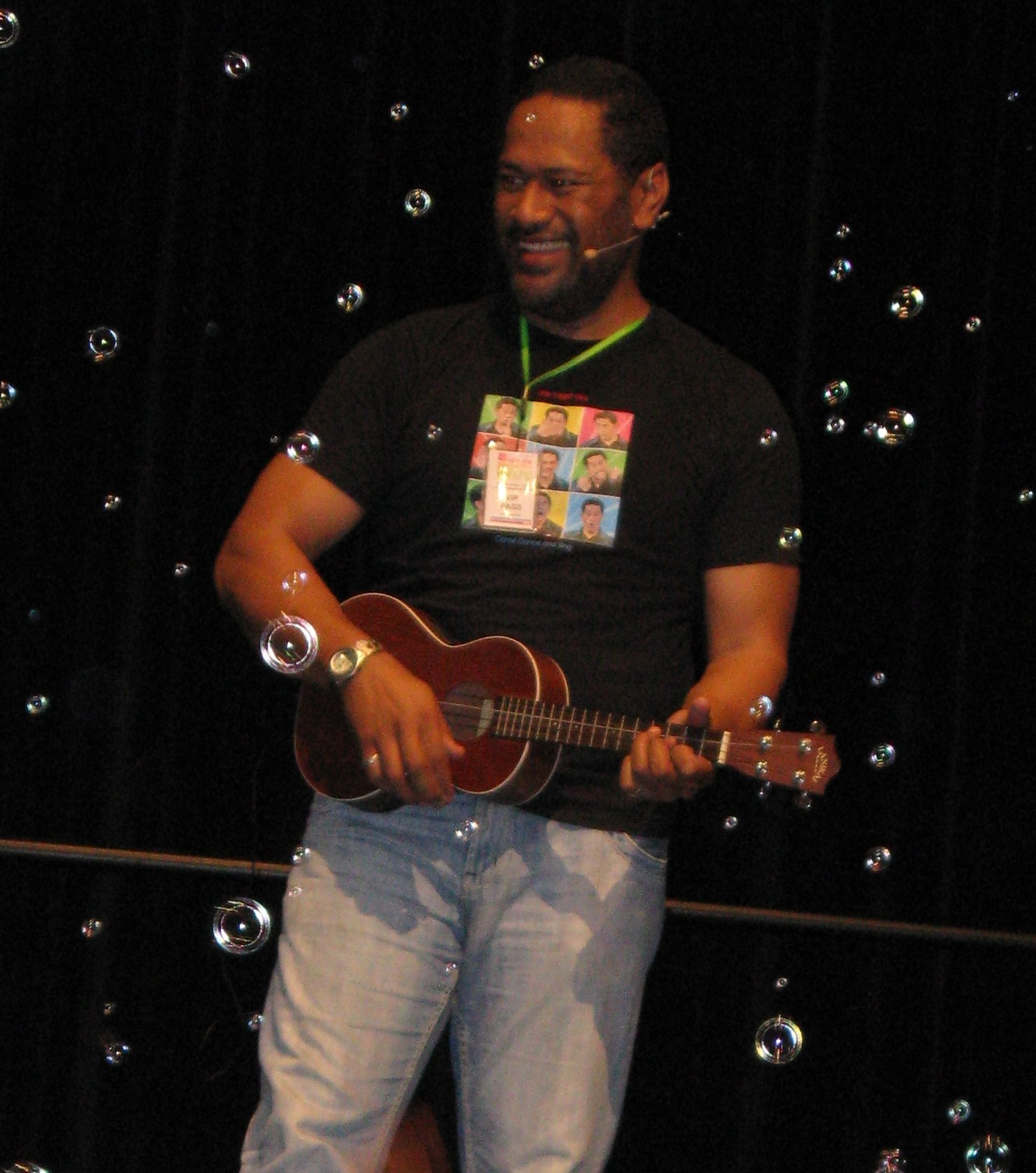
Jay Laga'aia performing

=== Film ===
Year	Title	Role	Notes
1988	The Navigator: A Medieval Odyssey	Jay	
1988	Never Say Die	Bruce	
2002	Star Wars: Episode II – Attack of the Clones	Gregar Typho	
2005	Star Wars: Episode III – Revenge of the Sith	Gregar Typho	
2006	Solo	Vincent	
2008	Crooked Business	Pickaxe	
2009	Lightswitch	Bo	Short
2009	Makazie One	Narrator (voice)	Short
2009	Daybreakers	Senator Wes Turner	
2012	The Unbroken	Morgan Stevens (voice)	
2013	The Wiggles: Go Santa Go!	Jay the Elf	Video
2015	The Spa	Ivan	Short
2020	The Legend of Baron To'a	George	
2024	KingsLand	Bouncer	
TBA	Shadow Wars	Dr. Keller	Post-production

=== Television ===
Year	Title	Role	Notes
1984–1986	Heroes	Ron Ualesi	TV series
1987	Gloss	Simon	TV series
1988	Strangers	Const. Campbell	TV series
1989	The Shadow Trader	Demo Worker	Episode "1.2"
1992	The Other Side of Paradise	Mana	TV miniseries
1993	Soldier Soldier	Sgt. Bob Gilligan	Episodes: "Shifting Sands", "Live Fire"
1994	High Tide	Buck Walton (voice)	Episode: "Hot Rocks"
1995	Mysterious Island	Tenape	Episodes: "No One Rules Me", "He's Not Heavy", "Make Yourselves a Home"
1995, 1997, 2000	Xena: Warrior Princess	Draco	Episodes: "Sins of the Past", "A Comedy of Eros", "Lyre, Lyre, Hearts on Fire"
1996–2001	Water Rats	Senior Const. Tommy Tavita	Supporting role (series 1–5)
1998	The Violent Earth	Jean-Christian	TV miniseries
2000	Green Sails	Maru	TV film
2000–2003	Street Legal	David Silesi	Main role
2005–2006	All Saints	Michael Stevenson	Episodes: "In Sickness and in Health", "Till Death Do Us Part"
2007	McLeod's Daughters	Gabriel	Episode: "A Spark from Heaven"
2008	The Strip	Joe Tahore / Frogman	Episode: "1.3"
2008–2010	Larry the Lawnmower	Narrator	TV series
2008–2009	Legend of the Seeker	Chase Brandstone	Episodes: "Prophecy", "Destiny", "Hartland", "Conversion"
2008–2011	Bed of Roses	Nick Pickering	Main role
2010–2012	Home and Away	Elijah Johnson	Regular role
2015–2018	Jay's Jungle	Jay	Main role
2017	Drop Dead Weird	Announcer	Episode: "The Zombie Spectacular"
2017	Sally and Possum	Crossing Guard	Episode: “Crossing the Road”
2018	Black Comedy	Guest	Episode: "3.4"
2018	Fighting Season	Siaosi Ulalei	TV miniseries
2019	Hardball	Mr. Butte	Episode: "Impossible Mission"
2021	Doctor Doctor	Graeme	1 episode

=== Other appearances ===
Year	Title	Role	Notes
1987	Spot On!	Host	TV series
2000	Russell Gilbert Live	Himself	Episode: "1.13"
2000	Surprise Surprise	Host	Episode: "1.2"
2000–2014	Play School	Himself	TV series
2001	The Big Time	Host	TV series
2001–2002	StarStruck	Host	TV series
2002	Celebrity Big Brother	Himself	TV series
2007	Spicks and Specks	Himself	Episode: "3.34"
2010	52 Annual TV Week Logie Awards	Himself	TV special
2010	Sleek Geeks	Himself	Episode: "Weeing"
2011	Talkin' 'Bout Your Generation	Himself	Episode: "3.12"
2017	I'm a Celebrity...Get Me Out of Here!	Himself	Series 3
2020	The Living Room	Himself — Guest	Episode: "9.10"
2022	Lego Star Wars: The Skywalker Saga	Captain Typho	Video game

== Theatre ==
Laga'aia has appeared in numerous theatre productions. Laga'aia appeared in the musical Grease. In 2025, Laga'aia appeared in the Hayes Theatre version of The Pirates of Penance.

Year	Title	Role	Notes	Ref
2013	Wicked	Ensemble	Civic Theatre Auckland	
2018	Shrek the Musical	Shrek		
2019	Peter Pan Goes Wrong		Lyric Theatre	
2020	Come Dance and Sing W/Jay Laga'aia	Self	Riverside Digital Theatre	
2021	Once		Darlinghurst Theatre	
2022	The Deb	Mayor Jase	The Rebel Theatre	
2023-24	Grease	Vince Fontaine	Adelaide season	
2025	The Pirates of Penzance	Pirate King	Hayes Theatre	
