= Fifi and Jules =

Radio show

- Genre: Comedy
- Running time: 4 - 6pm Weekdays (2 hours w/commercials)
- Country of origin: Australia
- Language: English
- Home station: Fox FM
- Syndicates: 2Day FM; B105 FM; SAFM; 92.9; NXFM; FM 104.7; Ace Radio Network (Regional Victoria); Grant Broadcasters (Tasmania); Capital Radio Network (New South Wales); ZM (New Zealand); Power FM (South Coast NSW); SeaFM Network (Regional Qld)
- Hosted by: Fifi Box; Jules Lund; Byron Cooke
- Produced by: Sam Cavanagh; Kerri Jones; Leon Sjogren
- Original release: February 2011 – December 2013
- Audio format: Stereo

Fifi and Jules was an Australian drive radio show with Fifi Box and Jules Lund and anchor Byron Cooke. It was broadcast across the Today Network from 4–6 pm weekdays.

== History ==
The show commenced in February 2011 after Hamish Blake and Andy Lee announced in August 2010, that they would be cutting down to a weekly show in 2011. Fifi Box and Jules Lund were announced as hosts of drive from Monday to Thursday.

In February 2013, Hamish & Andy moved to 4 pm Mondays, with Fifi and Jules presenting Tuesday to Friday.

In July 2013, Hamish & Andy moved to 3–4 pm each afternoon followed by drive with Fifi and Jules at 4–6 pm from Monday to Friday.

In November 2013, Fifi Box announced that she would be moving to host breakfast on Fox FM.

Sophie Monk replaced Fifi Box whilst she was on maternity leave.

In December 2013, it was announced that Fifi and Jules would be replaced by Dan and Maz in Drive as Box moves to Melbourne to host breakfast with Dave Thornton, and Lund joins Sophie Monk, Merrick Watts and Mel B on 2DayFM breakfast in Sydney.

== Team ==
Fifi and Jules team was made up of:

- Fifi Box
- Jules Lund
- Byron Cooke
- Sam Cavanagh - Producer
- Kerri Jones - Producer
- Leon Sjogren - Producer
- Grumpy Dave (Dave Cameron) - Content Director
- Josh Janssen aka Web Guy Josh- Digital Content Producer
- Chris Marsh - Audio Producer
- Danny O'Gready - Assistant Audio Producer
