= The Matt and Jo Show =

- The Matt and Jo Show logo
- Other names: Matt, Jo & Benno with the Fabulous Adam Richard
- Genre: Radio show
- Running time: 3 hours
- Country of origin: Australia
- Language: English
- Starring: Matt Tilley (2003–2013); Jo Stanley (2003–2013); Troy Ellis (2003–2013); Adam Richard (2003–2013); Chris Bennett (2003)
- Produced by: Kylie Brown; Jerimiah Busniak (audio); Carlie Sullivan (online)
- Executive producers: Paul Dowsley, Mel Murphy
- Recording studio: South Melbourne, Victoria
- Original release: 2003 – 2013
- Website: www.fox.com.au/shows/mattandjo

The Matt and Jo Show was a breakfast radio show broadcast on Fox FM in Melbourne, Australia. Matt Tilley and Jo Stanley were hosts, along with Troy Ellis as anchor and Adam Richard as gossip reporter. It was broadcast live 6–9 am weekday mornings from Austereo's South Melbourne studios, and it was replayed on Saturday mornings from 6–8 am.

== History ==
The show was founded late in 2003 after Tracy Bartram left Fox FM. Jo Stanley, who had been working at Fox FM on the show Jodie and Jo, then moved to Triple M to host The Shebang. Once Tracy Bartram officially left Fox FM, Jo joined the breakfast show, initially named Matt, Jo and Benno with the Fabulous Adam Richard.

Chris Bennett left a couple of months into the year and it was renamed The Matt & Jo Show with the Fabulous Adam Richard. Soon after, the show introduced anchor Troy Ellis and it was renamed to simply The Matt and Jo Show. The show was known for holding the highest ratings for over a number of years. News updates were presented by Krystal Keller.

In 2009, whilst Stanley was away on maternity leave, her position was filled by Michala Banas (McLeod's Daughters and Neighbours). Comedian Dave Thornton was a regular fill in presenter for Matt Tilley.

The Matt and Jo Show was the number 1 breakfast show in Melbourne, with more listeners than any other breakfast show. It has led the FM share in Melbourne for more than 40 surveys (five years).

It was announced on 4 October 2013 that the show would finish at the end of the year. The final show aired on Friday 29 November 2013 on the Fox FM rooftop.

In November 2013, Fifi Box and Dave Thornton were announced as the new Fox FM breakfast team, Fifi & Dave.

In October 2020, Fox FM celebrated 40 years, and Matt Tilley, Jo Stanley, Troy Ellis and Adam Richard reunited after seven years for a special one-hour show.

== Segments ==
Matt Tilley's Gotcha Calls

Gotcha Calls were a series of prank calls done by Matt Tilley. Each week Matt received emails from listeners of the show who set up a friend or a colleague for a Gotcha Call. The calls involved Matt Tilley projecting a strange voice and cornering the victim in a tough situation in the call, often involving embarrassing or angering the person. The calls were then broadcast on air around 7.50 am weekdays. This segment produced three Gold-selling CDs and made over $500,000 for Melbourne charities. Released through the late Michael Gudinski's Liberation record label, The Double Album (2006) and Three's A Crowd (2007) were both nominated for ARIA Awards.

Scoopla with The Fabulous Adam Richard

Scoopla with The Fabulous Adam Richard was a segment where Adam Richard presented his updated daily gossip and news about celebrities. This segment happened daily at 7.30 am and 8.30 am after the news.

Fox To The Rescue

Fox To The Rescue was a segment that received thousands of emails a year from the people of Melbourne wanting to do something kind for people in need or people wanting to say thanks to a friend or family member. The breakfast team would then choose people to ring up from the emails submitted, talk to them about their issue and help them by giving them something, such as a gift voucher or money.

Jobe's Footy Tips

Jobe's Footy Tips was a segment where the breakfast team was joined by the Essendon Football Club's Jobe Watson, who discussed the latest football controversies and also gave his footy tipping for the week live on-air. The segment aired on Friday mornings.
