= Head 2 Head =

Television series

- Genre: Game show
- Presented by: Ashley Bradnam
- Country of origin: Australia
- Original language: English

Production
- Running time: 22-26 minutes

Original release
- Network: ABC TV
- Release: 18 February – 9 December 2006

Head 2 Head was a sports quiz show that aired on ABC TV in Australia between 18 February and 9 December 2006 and broadcast on Saturday evenings initially at 6 pm, then at 5 pm. The show was hosted by Ashley Bradnam and produced by Nick Price.

== Format ==
The show format was for two contestants to answers sports trivia questions over four "quarters".

In the first quarter, competitors would answer ten general questions, all of which were either multiple choice or "true or false". One point was awarded for a correct answer and there was no penalty for an incorrect answer.

In the second quarter, competitors would answer up to twenty questions on a specialty topic in a maximum period of two minutes. The topics would be chosen by the contestants several weeks prior to the show. As with the first quarter, one point was awarded for a correct answer and there was no penalty for an incorrect answer.

The third quarter lasts two minutes and is a more traditional quiz show "buzzer round", again with general sports questions. One point is awarded for a correct answer but one point is now lost for an incorrect answer.

In the first six episodes of Pool A, the third quarter contained longer "Who am I?" questions. For these questions only, if a contestant answered incorrectly, the other player was given the rest of the clues and the chance to answer.

The fourth quarter is identical to the third except that two points are awarded for a correct answer and two points are deducted for an incorrect answer.

If points were equal after four-quarters, there was to be a tie-breaker system similar to a football penalty shootout, however none of the games finished in a tie.

== Competition format ==
Each pool would consist of 17 games with the winner returning to defend their title the following week. The 18th week of each series was the Pool Final in which the carryover champion would play against the person with the most wins during the series. The winners of the two Pool Finals would then play-off in the Grand Final.

== Production ==
Head 2 Head was announced by the ABC in early 2006

== Additional segments ==
- Degrees from the Don - often humorous segment based on the Six Degrees of Separation theory. Various celebrities are linked to Don Bradman through often spurious links.
- What Happened Next? - a famous (or infamous) piece of sporting footage is played, the film is frozen, rewound slightly and then played forward revealing what happened next.
- That's Not Right - footage and explanation for historic controversial sporting events

== Celebrity matches ==
In between the Pool A Final and the start of Pool B, five shows featuring celebrities, sporting and otherwise, were shown.

- Tamsyn Lewis v Clinton Hill
- Luke Darcy v Wil Anderson
- Mikey Robins v Steve Abbott
- Jason Stevens v Kevin Walters
- Tony Squires v Rebecca Wilson

== Prizes ==
The winner of Pool A (18 February - 17 June 2006) won a trip for two to the 2006 AFL Grand Final at the Melbourne Cricket Ground.

The winner of Pool B (29 July - 2 December 2006) won a trip for two to the 2007 Australian Open tennis men's and ladies singles finals at Melbourne Park.

The winner of the Grand Final (9 December 2006) won a trip for two the 2007 Wimbledon Championships men's and ladies singles finals.

Every contestant on the show received a $50 ABC Shop voucher.

== Winners ==
The Pool A Final was won by Daniel Viles of Queensland who defeated George Magoulias of New South Wales 48–37. Viles won 7 games during the series and Magoulias won 5.

The Pool B Final was won by Rob Caskie of the ACT who defeated Shane Jackman of Victoria 52–39. Caskie won 6 games during the series and Jackman won his only appearance before the Pool B Final.

In the Grand Final, Caskie defeated Viles 46–33.

== Contestant Information ==
Head 2 Head Champion Rob Caskie was born in Cootamundra, New South Wales, the same town in which cricketer Don Bradman was born.

Pool A Champion Daniel Viles is a regular guest of Richard Fidler on 612 ABC Brisbane.

Paul Lorraway, who lost to Viles during Pool A, was the series winner of Sport in Question, ABC TV's previous attempt at a sports quiz show in 1986.

Jonathon Makai who also lost to Viles in pool A went on to become host of the "Jono and Von Breakfast Show" on Magic 89.9 in Port Lincoln. He is currently a freelance writer and broadcaster based in London.

Despite the Head 2 Head Grand Final being promoted as happening on "the famous first Saturday in December", it eventually aired on the second Saturday in December after the ABC chose to broadcast a netball Test match in October during Head 2 Head's timeslot, thus pushing the entire schedule back one week.
