= Big Questions =

- Starring: Host; Jules Lund
- Country of origin: Australia
- No. of episodes: 5

Production
- Running time: 60 minutes (including commercials)

Original release
- Network: Channel Nine
- Release: 19 October 2006 – 2006

Big Questions was an Australian television show that was produced and broadcast on the Nine Network, with Jules Lund as host. It commenced broadcasting on 19 October 2006. It should not be confused with the Sydney Morning Herald column of the same name in the Saturday edition that poses sometimes serious, sometimes whimsical questions answered by readers. Prolific contributors are John Moir, Jim Dewar and David Buley.

== Premise ==
The show featured two panels each with two people debating on a popular question which divides people's opinions. Examples include Seinfeld or Friends, The Beatles or the Rolling Stones and Speedos or Boardshorts. A live audience cast their vote on which was the better of the two.

Many celebrities have been chosen to debate the issues:

- Red Symons
- Tom Gleeson
- Kate Kendall
- Andy Lee
- Hamish Blake
- Tottie Goldsmith
- Leo Sayer
- Sami Lukis
- Akmal Saleh
- Human Nature
- Livinia Nixon
- Trevor Marmalade

=== So far the audience has voted on ===
The Big Question	Verdict
Friends vs Seinfeld	Friends (originally a Nine Network program)
The Beatles vs The Rolling Stones?	The Beatles
Board shorts vs Speedos?	Board Shorts
Holdens vs Fords?	Holden (essentially a Commodore versus Falcon rivalry)
Is it ok to have sex on a first date?	No sex on a first date
Is Michael Jackson unique or a freak?	Michael Jackson is unique
Is Coke better than Pepsi?	Coke
Paul McCartney vs Heather Mills?	Paul McCartney
The Mullet: cool or uncool?	Uncool
Olivia Newton-John vs Kylie Minogue?	Kylie Minogue
The Brady Bunch vs Partridge Family?	The Brady Bunch
Can men and women be friends?	No
Phar Lap vs Makybe Diva	Phar Lap
Cold Chisel vs INXS	Cold Chisel
Aussies vs Kiwis	Aussies
Who is sexier? Jennifer Aniston vs Angelina Jolie	Angelina Jolie
Sean Connery vs Roger Moore	Sean Connery
Does Size Matter? Yes or No	Yes
Advance Australia Fair or I Still Call Australia Home	I still call Australia home
Megan Gale or Jennifer Hawkins	Megan Gale
Graham Kennedy or Paul Hogan	Graham Kennedy
One-piece or two-piece swimwear	One-piece
David Jones or Myer	David Jones
Guys prefer girls with Long hair or Short hair	Long Hair
Guys prefer girls as Brunette or Blonde	Brunette

== Background ==
Upon the program's commencement, there had been an increasing trend of pop culture panel programs on Australian television. The success of the ABC's Spicks and Specks began the popular trend and has been replicated, often unsuccessfully on other networks.
