= Man Bites God =

- Also known as: MBG
- Origin: Melbourne, Victoria, Australia
- Genres: Rock, pop, punk
- Years active: 2000–present
- Label: Independent
- Website: manbitesgod.com

Man Bites God are an Australian three-piece band from Melbourne formed in 2000 by James Hazelden (guitar and vocals) and Chris Tomkins (drums and vocals) after the demise of Hazelden's previous band, The Drowning Hitlers. Mark Woodward (bass guitar/recorder/vocals) was soon recruited and the group were spotted playing in an unassuming Fitzroy bar (Mayfields) by Dan Brodie who insisted the band support him at St Kilda's Esplanade Hotel (the 'Espy').

The band has a catalogue of six releases: Happy Songs (EP, 2002), Ultrasounds (EP, 2002), Man Bites God (LP, 2003), Boob Job for Sweetie Pie (EP, 2005) The Popular Alternative (LP, 2005) and Peppermint Superfrog (LP, 2007); and is notorious for twisted, dark and often blasphemous sense of humour. Consequently, religious groups have been known to deface or tear down posters advertising the band's performances.

Man Bites God tours regularly throughout Australia and performed at the 2004 Edinburgh Festival Fringe. They are also played regularly on the Dr. Demento show in the USA.

Their latest album Peppermint Superfrog was released on 2 June 2007 through MGM Distribution.

The band launched a podcast called "Theatre of the World" in August 2012.

== Music videos ==
Man Bites God generally produce their own music videos as their drummer, Chris Tomkins is a professional director/editor. However some of the more recent clips have been created by long-time fan and friend of the band, Sarah Phillips. Phillips is a graduate of RMIT Animation School and member of the cult Melbourne animation guerillas, Animation Club.

- Improvise – Shot on location at the Comics Lounge, Melbourne. This video features a huge cast of Melbourne comedians performing ridiculous vaudeville style acts as the band desperately try to maintain some semblance of dignity whilst singing about extreme contraceptive measures. Features the band's former manager, Rachel Barnes, as the girl at the romantic dinner.
- Annoying Song – A surrealistic hypnotic hodge-podge of old video and super-8 footage from the band's family collections. It also features some timelapse footage shot when the band drove from Melbourne to Adelaide using a webcam mounted to the front of the van taking one shot every second for the duration of the 8-hour journey. The video was nominated for Best Independent Clip in the 2005 Belowground III Music Video Awards.
- "Bride of the Dragon" (James Hazelden) – The ballad featuring Deborah Conway is supported with a slow-moving presentation of illustrations drawn by Sydney artist, Rhiannon McGuinness. Available on YouTube.
- Cubby House – This dark, macabre clip was shot in one night with the entire budget spent on a collection of bizarre costumes and lollies for the children. This clip was lit by Sydney-based lighting designer, Allan Hirons.
- Rock n' Roll Lifestyle – Created by Sarah Phillips using drawings of manga Man Bites God band members from their 2004 Adelaide Fringe Festival show poster for "Rock n' Roll High School".

== Television ==
Man Bites God performed the theme tune (composed by Hazelden) for the Comedy Channel's "The Adventures of Terrence and Spider" Professional Bouncers".

Man Bites God were the house band for Channel 31's live Saturday night variety show Darren & Brose. They also appeared regularly on Channel 31's Dream On.

== Politics ==
Angered by the outcome of the 2004 Australian Federal Election, members of the band created a Macromedia Flash application entitled Man Bites God's Anger Management which allowed visitors to the band's website to blow up John Howard, the newly re-elected conservative Prime Minister. As a result, Man Bites God was named in a government report into innovative campaign methods. The report was prepared by Dr Sarah Miskin and entitled Campaigning in the 2004 Federal Election: Innovations and Traditions.

== Related artists ==
- Rob McComb from the Triffids was guest guitarist on various songs on Ultrasounds.
- Bob Franklin performed dialogue on "Pathetique" from Man Bites God.
- Deborah Conway performed the vocals on "Bride of the Dragon" from The Popular Alternative.
- James Black from Mondo Rock and RocKwiz played electric sitar on "Girlfriend" from Peppermint Superfrog.
- Rev. Dr. Tim Harris performed the sermon on "Sleazy" from Ultrasounds.

== Discography ==
- Happy Songs (EP, 2002)
- Ultrasounds (EP, 2002)
- Man Bites God (2003)
- Boobjob for Sweetie Pie (EP, 2005)
- The Popular Alternative (2005)
- Peppermint Superfrog (2007)

Title	Length	Released	Track listing
Happy Songs	EP	May 2002	Improvise; D.D.W. Deli Girl; Sweet Charity; Happy Song; Erf; Smoke; This Song
Ultrasounds	EP	Oct 2002	Best Friend; Sleazy; Esmerelda; Lullabye; The Annoying Song; The Irish Drinking Song; Children of Japan; Sleazy (Porn Mix)
Man Bites God	LP	Nov 2003	Shapeshifter; Smorgasbord; Spelling Bee Girl; Sponsorship; My Shower Curtain; Justice Wears a Skirt; Trailer Park; Better Gnomes & Gardens; Jealous; Pathetique; Anywhere; Ramblin'
Boob Job for Sweetie Pie	EP	March 2005	Emily; Coy; It's For the Best; Inappropriate Touching; Bride of the Dragon (Acoustic)
The Popular Alternative	LP	Sept 2005	Rock n' Roll Lifestyle; Cubby House; Bride of the Dragon (Feat. Deborah Conway); God Bless the Dancing Girls; The Pope Song (Feat. Matt Sax); Work Experience Boy; The War March; Hymn; Funny Guy; Solar Flares; Win at All Costs
Peppermint Superfrog	LP	June 2007	Peppermint Superfrog; Monkeys; Autobiology; Butterfly; Psychopath; Psalm; Head; Europop 3000; Faker; Lubricated; You Get Me; Pareidolia Now; Girlfriend

== Related links ==
- The Drowning Hitlers website
- The Weekend People website – Mark Woodward's other musical project
