= Fox FM (Australia) =

Radio station in Melbourne, Australia

Coordinates: 37°51′40″S 144°59′05″E

Fox FM (3FOX)
- Australia
- Broadcast area: Melbourne, Victoria
- Frequency: 101.9 MHz FM
- Branding: 101.9 The Fox

Programming
- Language: English
- Format: Adult contemporary, Hot adult contemporary
- Affiliations: Hit Network

Ownership
- Owner: Southern Cross Austereo; (SCA Digital Pty Ltd)
- Sister stations: Triple M

History
- First air date: 1 August 1980
- Call sign meaning: 3 for Victoria; "Fox FM"

Technical information
- Licensing authority: ACMA
- ERP: 56,000 watts

Links
- Public licence information: Profile
- Website: fox.com.au

Fox FM (call sign: 3FOX) is a commercial FM radio station broadcasting in Melbourne, Victoria, Australia, on a frequency of 101.9 MHz, and is the flagship station on Southern Cross Austereo's Hit Network. The station's transmitter is shared with the ATV-10 transmitter on top of Mount Dandenong.

== History ==
Fox FM started life at 5pm on 1 August 1980. The station was put together by radio consultant and 1960s/1970s radio personality and programmer Rhett H. Walker, who also acted as first General Manager. This followed a successful stint for Walker as a consultant for Radio 3KZ in 1979. One of Fox FM's original advertising lines was 'Catch the Fox'. The original announcing team consisted of Mike Jeffries, John Aimes, Ralphe Rickman, Rod McNeil, Graham Braddy, Richard Combe, and overnight announcers Geoff Harrison, Noel Miller and Peter Acfield. In the newsroom were Pam Wilson, Gary McQuade and Michael Schilberger.

Fox FM was one of two original FM radio licence holders in Melbourne. It aimed to be the first commercial FM station to commence broadcasting in Australia, although it was eventually beaten by 3EON (which is now Fox FM's sister station, Triple M). Fox FM started life playing popular easy listening music whilst its other FM rival had adopted a more rock album orientated format. Throughout the history of the station its logo and marketing have always included a picture of a fox, although this was discontinued in 2005 when the entire Today Network introduced new standardised logos, much to the disappointment of many.

The first song to be played on air, George Benson's "Breezin'," was played at the wrong speed for a few bars by the station's first presenter, John Amies. Amies suggested this was due to repeated rehearsals of the station opening on instruction from studio manager Gary Collins, who was allegedly fussing around him in the studio right before the station went on air.

The first station studio equipment was a 16 channel Poul Kirk mixing desk, four cuemaster cart decks, JBL studio pro speakers and (then brand new) Technics turntables. Located in Nunawading, the studio was pleasant to work in with a floor-to-ceiling window giving a view of filming of such Channel Ten programs as Neighbours, Prisoner and the short-lived Holiday Island.

The first two years of the station's life were not easy. Melbourne listeners did not initially flock to the new FM stations, sticking to their regular listening habits with stations such as 3AW, 3MP and 3XY. It was positioned originally as a classy easy listening style format. The format, FM is Fox Music, came later, under the management of former 3XY station manager Graham Smith.

In 1982, the station's owners (which included Sir Donald Trescowthick, major shareholder of The Age Newspaper group) lost confidence in the original format and hired Smith to implement changes.

All the former announcers, except for Geoff Harrison were let go. Also, the station's instigator and first General Manager, the late Rhett H. Walker (later Associate Dean at La Trobe University) moved on to greener pastures.

From then on, the station was positioned with a pop rock format, appealing to the widest possible audience. This caused a steady rise in ratings through the mid-1980s, eventually landing the station in top position in Melbourne by 1986. The changes included new presenters, such as Gavin Wood (former TV show Countdown and 3XY announcer) and Barry Bissell. Take 40 Australia was a weekly countdown of the current ARIA Top 40 singles chart. During this time, the station also aired American Top 40 with Casey Kasem.

In 1986, Fox FM was bought by the owners of SAFM to create Austereo, which now - as the Hit Network - boasts five additional stations around Australia. It was at this time that announcer Mark Carter was moved from the breakfast shift to the afternoon shift, quickly becoming the most popular announcer in Melbourne over a record 11 surveys conducted and contributing to the rise in popularity of the station.

In 1996, the Today Network, owned by Austereo, merged with the Triple M network to form a single radio company. The merge was unpopular with Fox staff due to the rivalry between the two stations.

In September 2008, Fox FM re-located from studios at 180 St Kilda Road (with sister station Triple M) to brand new studios at 257 Clarendon Street, South Melbourne.The Matt & Jo Show gave away many items from the old studios during their last show at the St Kilda Road studios.

In May 2021, Southern Cross Austereo announced that the network will re-locate to 101 Moray Street, South Melbourne from mid 2022 after signing a 10 year lease. The network will take up approximately 3,000sqm on the second floor of the state-of-the-art commercial building.

In June 2022, Fox FM re-located from studios at 257 Clarendon Street, South Melbourne (with sister station Triple M) to 101 Moray Street, South Melbourne. Rival broadcaster Nova Entertainment's Melbourne studios and offices (Nova 100, smooth 91.5) now occupy the Clarendon Street facility.

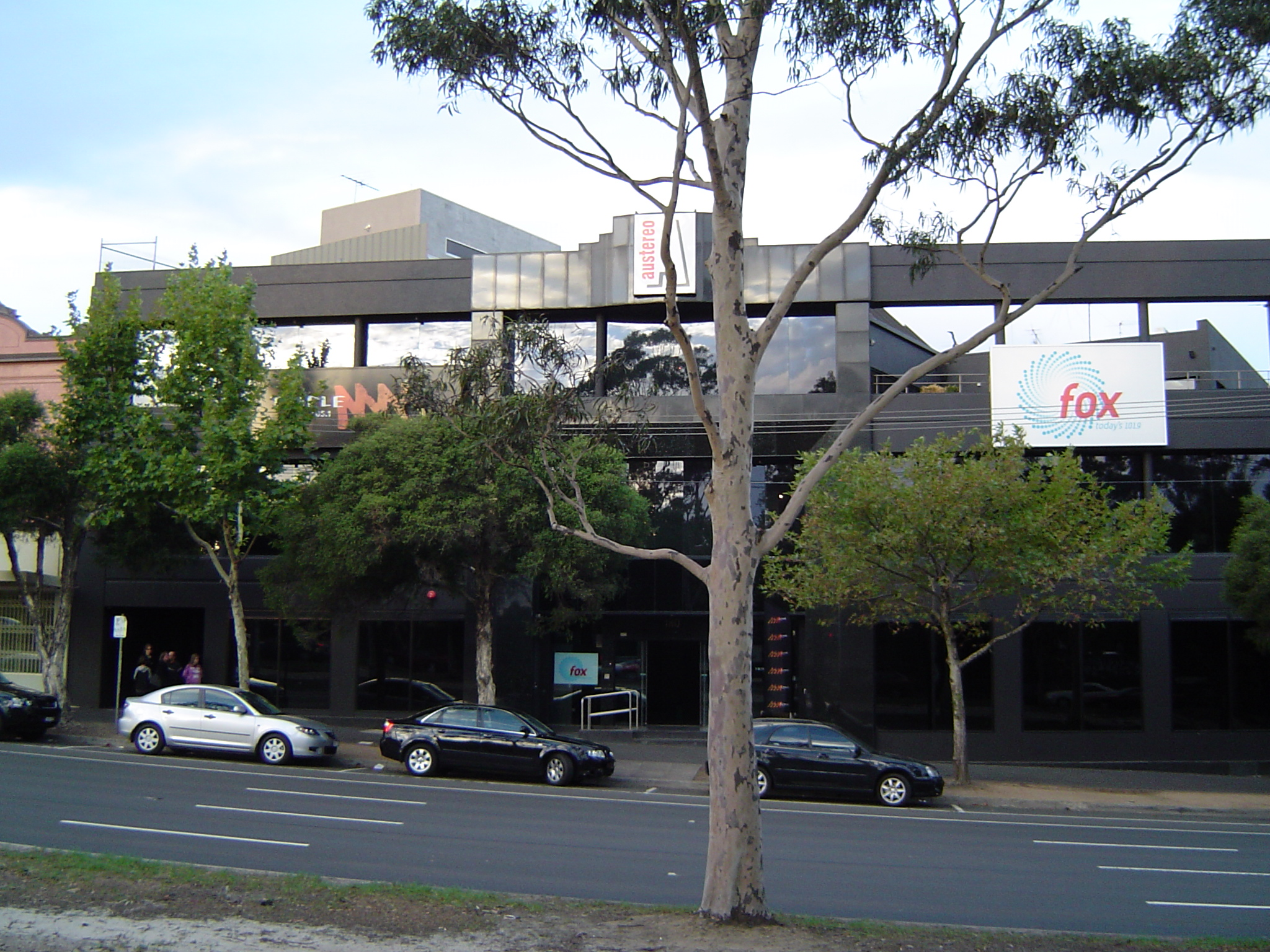
Fox FM building (1989–2008), St Kilda Road, St Kilda

== Transmission ==
Fox FM transmits from the ATV-10 transmission tower on top of Mount Dandenong, from a shared facility alongside radio stations Nova 100, Triple M, Gold 104.3, KIIS 101.1, SYN 90.7 and Triple R. Its base power is 10 kW, and this is provided by a Harris HT10 FM transmitter.

The station is simulcast on digital radio in Melbourne.

== Programming ==
Fox FM gradually grew from a top 40/pop format into a top 40/dance format over its history. The station is tightly focused on promoting mainstream chart music and songs on rotation are played 5-6 times a day, with very little variation. Notable past announcers and programs have included Pillowtalk with Dr Sally Cockburn (Dr Feelgood), Danger: Low Brow with David Armstrong and Brett McLeod, net@nite with Andy Grace, Barry Bissell's Take 40 Australia, and ABC TV's Jodie J. Hill.

From 1995 to 1998, Fox FM broadcast the Martin/Molloy drive program with Tony Martin and Mick Molloy. This program was networked to over 50 stations around Australia, and is considered one of Australia's most successful FM radio shows.

For six years the breakfast shift was held by Tracy Bartram and Matt Tilley, using the title Tracy and Matt in the Morning. After a gradual increase in ratings, the pair secured the number one position for the Melbourne breakfast shift in the ACNielsen survey during 2001, beating traditional Melbourne number one station 3AW. Along with the rest of the station, Tracey and Tilley's ratings fell with the introduction of rival station Nova 100 into the market.

In 2003, Fox FM launched Matt, Jo and Benno, featuring Matt Tilley, Jo Stanley, Chris Bennett and Adam Richard. Chris Bennett left a couple of months into the year and it was renamed The Matt & Jo Show with the Fabulous Adam Richard. Soon after, the show introduced anchor Troy Ellis and it was renamed to simply The Matt and Jo Show. The show has consistently won the FM breakfast time slot, beating closest rivals Hughesy & Kate at Nova 100 for over 7 years.

From 2006, Fox FM was home to Australia's most successful networked radio show Hamish & Andy, starring Hamish Blake and Andy Lee. They finished their daily drive program on Friday 26 November 2010 and went on to broadcast a drive program on Mondays and a late morning program on Fox FM every day from Tuesday to Friday. Blake and Lee then went on to host Hamish & Andy's Happy Hour which aired at 3pm on weekdays. Blake and Lee have returned to host the drive show in July 2015.

In 2011, Fifi Box and Jules Lund joined forces to replace Hamish & Andy in the drive slot with their show Fifi and Jules which was broadcast across the Today Network from 4pm-6pm weekdays.

It was announced on 4 October 2013 that The Matt & Jo Show would finish at the end of the year after hosting breakfast for the last 10 years.

In November 2013, Fifi Box announced on Fifi and Jules that she would be leaving the show to host Fox FM breakfast with Dave Thornton. The new breakfast show Fifi & Dave launched in January 2014. In April 2016, Brendan Fevola joined the breakfast show and it was renamed to Fifi, Dave & Fev.

In December 2016, Hamish Blake and Andy Lee announced that they will be leaving radio at the end of 2017 to pursue their careers in television

In January 2017, Byron Cooke, the breakfast shows long-time anchor had his name added to the shows line-up Fifi, Dave, Fev & Byron.

In February 2017, The Project talk-show host Carrie Bickmore and comedian Tommy Little joined forces to host a national early drive show Carrie & Tommy featuring anchor Chris "Buzz" Bezzina. The show first aired on 13 February 2017 and broadcasts across the Hit Network. It competes against KIIS FM's 3PM Pick-Up which airs in the same time slot.

In September 2017, Dave Thornton announced his resignation from Fox FM to pursue his career as a stand-up comedian.

In October 2017, Hit Network announced that Hughesy & Kate will depart KIIS 101.1 to host the drive home from 4:30PM to 6:30PM, with Carrie & Tommy being extended to broadcast from 3:00PM to 4:30PM.

In December 2017, Hamish Blake and Andy Lee left their high rating drive show Hamish & Andy to pursue careers in television, with the last week of their show being dedicated to touring Australia as a part of their Coolboys and the Frontman 2017 World Tour. They also announced that they will be continuing a weekly podcast with Southern Cross Austereo in 2018.

In November 2020, Byron Cooke announced his departure from Fifi, Fev & Byron for personal reasons and to also seek new challenges. It was also announced that comedian Nick Cody would join the show from January 2021 and the show renamed to Fifi, Fev & Nick.

== Schedule ==
Time	Show
6 am–9 am	Fifi, Fev & Nick
9 am–12 pm	Tim Lee
12 pm–3 pm	Brad Wood
3 pm–6 pm	Carrie & Tommy
6 pm–7 pm	Fifi, Fev & Nick's Happy Hour
7 pm–10 pm	The Hot Hits with Nic & Loren
6 pm–8 pm Sundays	The Pulse with Seany B

== News/traffic announcers ==
Newsreaders:

- Alexandra Bryant (Breakfast)
- Celeste Mitsiou (Workday)
- Rebecca Maddern (Drive)
