= Matt Tilley =

Australian comedian (born 1969)

- Born: Matthew Vernon Thompson Tilley; 4 March 1969 (age 57); Melbourne, Australia
- Occupation: Radio presenter
- Spouse: Susie Tilley
- Children: 3

Matt Vernon Thompson Tilley (born 4 March 1969 in Melbourne) is an Australian former radio presenter and stand-up comedian.

== Personal life ==
Tilley was raised in Mount Eliza. He completed his secondary school education in 1986 at The Peninsula School in Mount Eliza. He completed a Bachelor of Laws degree from Monash University, taking 11 years to complete the degree, and a Diploma in Not-For-Profit Governance. He began stand-up comedy in 1987. He is married and has three children. He is an avid produce grower, food-waste fighter, and compassionate storyteller.

== Career ==
=== Radio ===
- Fox FM – Morning Crew
- Fox FM – Vernon All Request
- Fox FM – Hedgeburners
- Fox FM – Tramspotters (1997)
- Fox FM – Tracy & Matt in the Morning (1997–2003) with Tracy Bartram
- Fox FM – The Matt & Jo Show (2004–2013)
- Triple M – The One Percenters with Joe Hildebrand (2014)
- KIIS 101.1 – Matt & Jane with Jane Hall (2015)
- KIIS 101.1 – Matt & Meshel with Meshel Laurie (2016–2017)
- Nova 100 – Matt Tilley in the Morning (2019)

=== "Gotcha" calls ===
In early 2005, The Matt and Jo Show introduced a new segment which aired at 7:50 am titled "Matt Tilley's Gotcha Calls". The segment features Tilley making prank phone calls. Triple M in Sydney also featured Tilley on the Grill Team where he presented "gotcha" calls on a regular basis.

Fox FM, in association with Michael Gudinski, released a compilation album of Tilley's gotcha calls, Cereal Pest: The Gotcha Calls. The album reached number twelve on the ARIA charts and was also nominated for ARIA Award for Best Comedy Release at the 2006 ARIA Awards.

The gotcha calls continued throughout 2006 and eventually spawned a two-disc CD sequel, Cereal Pest: Gotcha Calls – The Double Album, which was released a year later on 21 October 2006. The album reached number four on the ARIA charts.

A third double-CD gotcha call album, Cereal Pest: Gotcha Calls – Three's a Crowd, was released on 10 November 2007. The album reached number fourteen on the ARIA charts.

A fourth album, The Gotcha Calls – The Final Call, was released on 23 October 2009 and reached number eight on the ARIA charts.

=== Television ===
- Ten Network – The Fugitive (2000)
- Nine Network – The Great Chase (2000)
- Seven Network – The Chat Room (2003)
- Fox Footy – The Greatest (2017)

Matt has also been featured as a performer on the Network Ten series Thank God You're Here and most recently co-hosted the failed Nine Network show Surprise Surprise Gotcha.

== Post-media career ==
In 2020, Tilley joined Foodbank Victoria as their Chief Communications Officer.

In August 2024, Tilley was appointed as the next CEO of FightMND, a charity organisation whose mission it is to find effective treatments and ultimately a cure for motor neurone disease.

== Charitable work ==
The sales of Tilley's 2006 and 2007 albums raised a total of A$366,000: $160,000 for the Mercy Hospital for Women, Heidelberg, and $206,600 for the Royal Women's Hospital, Carlton. Proceeds of the third album went to community groups.

An avid runner, in September 2006, Tilley ran continuously on a treadmill for the duration of The Matt and Jo Show. Soliciting per-kilometre sponsorship for the Mental Illness Fellowship of Victoria, he raised $41,000.

In 2008, Tilley sought sponsorship for a run from the new Fox FM studios in Clarendon Street in South Melbourne to Frankston, raising $91,500 for P.A.N.D.A. (the Post- and Antenatal Depression Association).

In 2011, Tilley raised $900 for the Royal Children's Hospital (RCH) through a segment that came about through his constant use of the saying "The thing is...". An avid listener by the stage name of Professor Brent was required to listen between 6 and 9 am for the period of one week to count the number of times Tilley said "The thing is...". For every time Tilley let one slip, he agreed to donate $100 to the RCH.

== Controversies ==
In 2014, Tilley was involved in a scandal during a segment in the Triple M radio station owned by Southern Cross Austereo. Colombians in Australia through the Colombian consulate asked for a formal apology from Triple M for comments they considered offensive. An investigation was conducted by the Australian Communications and Media Authority (ACMA) which found that "although the stereotype is based on factual elements, the ACMA is satisfied that the segment mildly ridiculed the Colombian people, and that by inviting Colombian callers to comment on whether they had used cocaine, to some extent it encouraged the audience to share these feelings of ridicule." However, ACMA found that "while the presenters explored a stereotype with the listeners, and were at times disrespectful of the Colombian people, any ridicule that was encouraged was not sufficient to reach the high threshold that is contemplated by the Codes." A full record of the investigation can be found in ACMA's website.

In 2015, Tilley received international publicity when interviewing Amy Schumer, who was promoting her film Trainwreck. Tilley referred to Schumer's character as "skanky", which Schumer took exception to.

== Discography ==
=== Albums ===
List of albums, with selected details, chart positions and certifications
Title	Details	Peak positions	Certification
Title	Details	AUS	Certification
Cereal Pest: The Gotcha Calls	Release date: November 2005; Label: Liberation (LIBCD71872); Formats: CD, Digital	12	ARIA: Gold
Cereal Pest: Gotcha Calls – The Double Album	Release date: October 2006; Label: Liberation (LIBCD8227-2); Formats: CD, Digital	4	ARIA: Gold
Cereal Pest: Gotcha Calls – Three's a Crowd	Release date: November 2007; Label: Liberation (LIBCD9261-2); Formats: CD, Digital	14	ARIA: Gold
The Gotcha Calls – The Final Call	Release date: October 2009; Label: Liberation (LMCD0089); Formats: CD, digital	8	

== Awards and nominations ==
=== ARIA Music Awards ===
The ARIA Music Awards are a set of annual ceremonies presented by Australian Recording Industry Association (ARIA), which recognise excellence, innovation, and achievement across all genres of the music of Australia. They commenced in 1987.

Year	Nominee / work	Award	Result	Ref.
2006	Cereal Pest	Best Comedy Release	Nominated	
2008	Cereal Pest: Gotcha Calls – Three's a Crowd	Best Comedy Release	Nominated	
