= Tracy Bartram =

Australian singer and comedian

- Born: June 17, 1959 (age 67); London, UK
- Origin: Melbourne, Australia
- Occupations: comedian, radio personality
- Years active: 1989–present
- Website: tracybartram.com.au

Tracy Bartram (born 17 June 1959) is an Australian comedian, radio personality, singer and podcaster. Although born in the UK, she grew up and resides in Melbourne, Australia.

She began performing stand-up comedy in 1989 while working in sales and marketing. Her first gig was a ten-minute stand-up comedy stint at the Hilton Hotel.

== Career ==
During her time at Fox FM, Bartram interviewed many people on her own show. Interviewees included Susan Sarandon, Kristin Davis, Anastacia, Ronan Keating, Matt Damon, Jodie Foster, Geoffrey Rush and Bob Geldof. After a two-year (2003–2005) break from radio, she joined the Mix 101.1 team in March 2006 with the Tracy and Tim for Breakfast show (with Tim Smith).
