= Sally Aitken (director) =

Australian documentary director, writer and producer

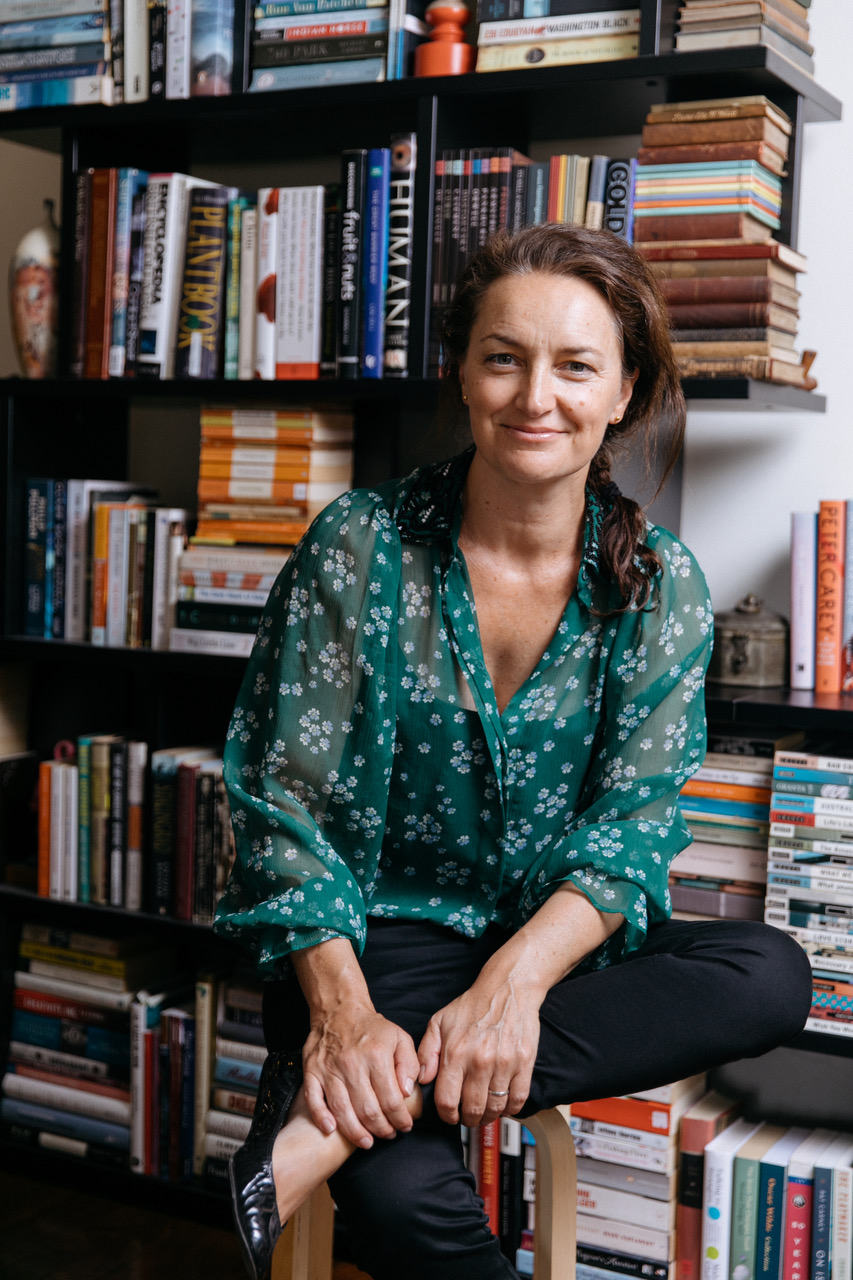
- Occupations: Director, writer, producer
- Years active: 2004–present

Sally Aitken is an Australian documentary film and television director, writer, and producer. She is known for Playing with Sharks: The Valerie Taylor Story; David Stratton: A Cinematic Life; and Hot Potato: The Story of the Wiggles. She is co-founder, co-principal (with Aline Jacques), and director of the all-female film production company SAM Content.

== Career ==
Sally Aitken has produced, written, and directed several documentary films.

She is known for her work on the documentaries Playing with Sharks: The Valerie Taylor Story, David Stratton: A Cinematic Life (about film critic David Stratton), Streets of Your Town, and The Week the Women Went.

In 2022, she co-founded the production company Sam Content, with Aline Jacques. In the same year, her documentary Playing with Sharks, which was produced by Bettina Dalton, was screened at Sundance.

She co-wrote, directed and produced the documentary feature, Hot Potato: The Story of the Wiggles, for Amazon Prime Video, released in 2023. Co-writer and -director was Fraser Grut, and Aline Jacques, Cass Avery, Daniel Story, and Fraser Grut were co-producers on the film.

She wrote and directed the feature-length documentary, Every Little Thing, which was selected for screening in the documentary competition at the 2024 Sundance Film Festival. The film was produced by Bettina Dalton, and edited by Tania Nehme. It also screened at Adelaide Film Festival in October 2024, with Aitken in attendance at the first screening. The film follows retired writer and teacher Terry Masear, who rescues injured and abandoned hummingbirds at her bird rescue centre, the Los Angeles Hummingbird Rescue, for a season.

== Accolades ==
Aitken was nominated for Emmy Awards in 2018 at the International Emmy Award for Best Arts Programming for the documentary film David Stratton: A Cinematic Life, and at the 43rd News and Documentary Emmy Awards for the documentary Playing With Sharks in 2022.

=== List of awards and nominations ===
| Year | Result | Award | Category | Work | Ref. |
|---|---|---|---|---|---|
| 2022 | Nominated | AACTA Awards | Best Direction in Nonfiction Television | Books That Made Us | |
| 2021 | Nominated | AACTA Awards | Best Documentary | Playing with Sharks: The Valerie Taylor Story | |
| 2021 | Nominated | Australian Writers' Guild | Documentary – Public Broadcast | Playing with Sharks: The Valerie Taylor Story | |
| 2021 | Won | Minneapolis–Saint Paul International Film Festival | World Cinema – Documentary | Playing with Sharks: The Valerie Taylor Story | |
| 2021 | Won | Provincetown International Film Festival | Best Documentary | Playing with Sharks: The Valerie Taylor Story | |
| 2021 | Nominated | Sundance Film Festival | World Cinema – Documentary | Playing with Sharks: The Valerie Taylor Story | |
| 2017 | Nominated | Cannes Film Festival | Golden Eye | David Stratton: A Cinematic Life | |
| 2017 | Nominated | AWGIE Awards | Best Documentary | Streets of Your Town | |
| 2009 | Nominated | Leo Awards | Best Documentary Program or Series | The Week the Women Went | |
| 2008 | Nominated | Gemini Awards | Best Reality Program or Series | The Week the Women Went | |

== Filmography ==
| Year | Title | Director | Writer | Producer | Note |
|---|---|---|---|---|---|
| 2024 | Every Little Thing | ✓ | ✓ | | Documentary |
| 2023 | Hot Potato: The Story of the Wiggles | ✓ | ✓ | ✓ | Documentary |
| 2021 | Books That Made Us | ✓ | | | TV series |
| 2021 | Shark Beach with Chris Hemsworth | ✓ | | | Documentary |
| 2021 | Playing with Sharks: The Valerie Taylor Story | ✓ | ✓ | | Documentary |
| 2019 | The Pool | ✓ | ✓ | | 2 episodes |
| 2018 | Nolan – The Man and the Myth | ✓ | ✓ | | Documentary |
| 2018 | The Pacific: In the Wake of Captain Cook with Sam Neill | ✓ | ✓ | ✓ | 6 episodes |
| 2017 | David Stratton: A Cinematic Life | ✓ | | | 3 episodes |
| 2016 | Streets of Your Town | ✓ | ✓ | | Documentary |
| 2015 | Getting Frank Gehry | ✓ | ✓ | ✓ | Documentary |
| 2015 | Imagine | ✓ | ✓ | ✓ | TV series |
| 2015 | The Great Australian Race Riot | ✓ | ✓ | ✓ | Documentary |
| 2013 | Air Rescue | ✓ | | | 6 episodes |
| 2012 | Family Confidential | ✓ | ✓ | | 1 episode |
| 2011 | Seduction in the City | ✓ | ✓ | | Documentary |
| 2009 | Ultimate Engineering | ✓ | | ✓ | 1 episode |
| 2008 | The Week the Women Went | ✓ | | ✓ | 8 episodes |
| 2007 | National Geographic: Engineering the Impossible | ✓ | ✓ | ✓ | 1 episode |
| 2006 | The Blonde Mystique | ✓ | ✓ | | Documentary |
| 2006 | Warrior Empire: The Mughals of India | ✓ | | ✓ | Documentary |
| 2004 | Colonial House | ✓ | ✓ | ✓ | 2 episodes |
