= The Merrick & Rosso Show =

Australian TV comedy show

- Genre: Comedy; Variety
- Starring: Merrick Watts; Tim Ross
- Country of origin: Australia
- Original language: English
- No. of seasons: 2
- No. of episodes: 22

Production
- Executive producers: RP Sekon; Merrick Watts; Tim Ross; Darren Chau (the Comedy Channel); Alex Ristevski (the Comedy Channel)
- Producer: Joel Slack-Smith
- Running time: 30 minutes (including commercials)

Original release
- Network: The Comedy Channel
- Release: 2 October 2008 – 11 June 2009

The Merrick & Rosso Show is an Australian comedy television series which aired on The Comedy Channel, with its first broadcast on 2 October 2008. It was hosted by Tim Ross and Merrick Watts, who were better known as comedy duo Merrick and Rosso. At the time of their broadcast, they also presented a breakfast radio show is broadcast on Nova 96.9.

The comedy duo previously hosted the television shows Merrick and Rosso Unplanned on the Nine Network and The B Team for Network Ten. They also hosted Planet Merrick and Rosso and Super Planet Merrick and Rosso for The Comedy Channel. Merrick Watts has also appeared in the comedy series The Hollowmen and Thank God You're Here.

The show also appeared on a six-day delay on FOX8.

On 28 January 2009, The Comedy Channel approved a second season for the series, which began airing on 2 April 2009.

In November 2009, Merrick and Rosso announced their split and so a third series was never commissioned.

== Episodes ==
=== Season 1 (2008) ===
- Episode 1 - Features: Ray Martin (aired 2 October 2008)
- Episode 2 - Features: Brendan Cowell (aired 9 October 2008)
- Episode 3 - Features: Kate Ritchie (aired 16 October 2008)
- Episode 4 - Features: The Veronicas (aired 23 October 2008)
- Episode 5 - Features: Stephen Curry (aired 30 October 2008)
- Episode 6 - Features: Ian Thorpe (aired 6 November 2008)
- Episode 7 - Features: Ryan Fitzgerald (aired 13 November 2008)
- Episode 8 - Features: Peter Helliar (aired 20 November 2008)
- Episode 9 - Features: Ian "Dicko" Dickson (aired 27 November 2008)
- Episode 10 - Features: Judith Lucy (aired 4 December 2008)
- Episode 11 - Features: [Christmas special all clips from episodes] (aired 11 December 2008)

=== Season 2 (2009) ===
- Episode 1 – Features: Ed Phillips (aired 2 April 2009)
- Episode 2 – Features: Tom Williams (aired 9 April 2009)
- Episode 3 – Features: Jeff Fatt and Anthony Field of The Wiggles (aired 16 April 2009)
- Episode 4 – Features: Magda Szubanski (aired 23 April 2009)
- Episode 5 – (aired 30 April 2009)
- Episode 6 – (aired 7 May 2009)
- Episode 7 – (aired 14 May 2009)
- Episode 8 – (aired 21 May 2009)
- Episode 9 – (aired 28 May 2009)
- Episode 10 – (aired 4 June 2009)
- Episode 11 (Bonus "Stimulus Package" episode) – (aired 11 June 2009)

== DVD release ==
The first series was released on DVD on 6 May 2009, and includes all ten first series episodes, as well as the show's pilot episode, and an additional 30 minutes of bonus material.

The Merrick & Rosso Show: Series 1
Set Details	Special Features
10 Episodes; 2-disc Set; Running time: 360 minutes	Pilot episode; Bonus footage (30 minutes)
Release Dates
Region 4
6 May 2009

== See also ==
- Merrick and Rosso Unplanned
- The B Team
- Merrick and Rosso
