= Ben Hewett =

Australian actor (born 1978)

- Born: 17 February 1978 (age 48); Brisbane, Queensland, Australia

Ben Hewett (born 17 February 1978 in Brisbane, Queensland) is an Australian actor and presenter. He is best known for his role as a presenter in "The Big Arvo", formerly titled The Big Breakfast, along with Jesse Tobin, Luke Jacobz, Jenny Hardy and Anna Choy.

On The Big Arvo, his segments included Ben's Big Cook Up, where he had to cook a recipe that was sent in from viewers, with a time limit of only 2 minutes. His other segment was Celebrity Make Me a Sandwich, where a celebrity had to make a sandwich for Ben with only the ingredients that the celebrity provided.

Ben now works in television production for various studios in Melbourne.

== Filmography ==
- "The Big Arvo" (2000) Himself
- "The Weakest Link" (2001) Himself
- "Royal Children's Hospital Good Friday Appeal 2004" (2004) Himself
- "Slender : The Unauthorized Documentary" (2012) Himself
