= Ernie Dingo =

Australian actor and television presenter

Ernie Dingo AM
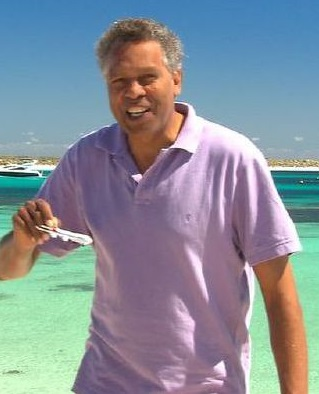
- Dingo presenting The Great Outdoors
- Born: Ernest Ashley Dingo; 31 July 1956 (age 70); Bullardoo Station, Western Australia, Australia
- Occupations: Comedian, actor, TV presenter
- Years active: 1976–present
- Spouse: Sally Ashton-Dingo (née Butler) (1989–2011)
- Children: 5

Ernest Ashley Dingo AM (born 31 July 1956) is an Indigenous Australian comedian, actor and TV presenter, originating from the Yamatji people of the Murchison region of Western Australia. He is a designated Australian National Living Treasure.

== Early life ==
Born on 31 July 1956, at Bullardoo Station, Dingo was the second child of nine, with three brothers and five sisters. He grew up in Mullewa, Western Australia with his family.

He attended both Prospect Primary School and Geraldton High School in his hometown in Western Australia.

Dingo got his first big break in acting after moving to Perth and meeting Richard Walley, with whom he played basketball in a local team. He then went on to play state league first division for the East Perth Hawks. He completed an apprenticeship in sign writing.

== Career ==
Dingo rose to fame when he collaborated with Richard Walley to create a public performance of the Welcome to Country ceremony in Perth in 1976, after dancers from the Pacific islands would not perform without one. As an Australian National Living Treasure, he promoted the Generation One "Hand Across Australia", which was a promotion for Indigenous recognition and equal rights.

=== Film ===
Dingo's film career began in the early 1980s and he appeared regularly on screen through the 1990s. He starred in the title role in the 1987 docu-drama biopic Tudawali and appeared in Bruce Beresford's 1987 drama The Fringe Dwellers. He had a major supporting role in the international comedy blockbuster Crocodile Dundee II in 1988. He appeared as himself in the 1989 comedy Cappuccino and had a major role in the 1991 Wim Wenders film Until the End of the World. In 1993 he starred in Blackfellas and had a lead role in 1996's Dead Heart. In 1998 he starred in Somewhere in the Darkness. In 2010 he returned to the silver screen with a role in the Aboriginal musical Bran Nue Dae along with Jessica Mauboy and Geoffrey Rush.

=== Television and other appearances ===
Dingo's first minor big break in television was in 1989 in the first season of Channel 7 sketch comedy TV show Fast Forward (1989–1992).

As an actor, he has also appeared in many Australian television series such as Blue Heelers, The Flying Doctors, Heartbreak High and Rafferty's Rules. He appeared in the TV mini-series The Cowra Breakout (1984), A Waltz Through the Hills (1987), (for which he won an AFI Award for Best Actor in a Television Drama) and Kings in Grass Castles (1997), as well as co-starring with Cate Blanchett in the Australian television drama series Heartland (known as Burned Bridges in the United States).

He hosted the television program The Great Outdoors for 16 years from its beginning in 1993 to its end in 2009.

Dingo narrated the Indigenous segment of the 2000 Olympic Games opening ceremony in Sydney, New South Wales.

In May 2007, Dingo appeared as one of the celebrity performers on the celebrity singing competition reality show It Takes Two. Dingo also hosted the first series of No Leave, No Life, on Channel Seven.

In February 2012 Dingo and his family were featured in episode three of the Australian Broadcasting Corporation (ABC) documentary series Family Confidential.

He appears in an episode of Serangoon Road, an Australian-Singaporean television drama series which premiered on 22 September 2013 on the ABC and HBO Asia. Also in 2013, Dingo plays a Vietnam veteran, a retired Army drill sergeant facing his demons in episode six of the second series of Redfern Now ("Dogs of War"). The episode was shown at the Adelaide Film Festival in October 2013. In 2018 he played Keith Groves in the TV miniseries Mystery Road.

Dingo hosts the free-to-air travel show Going Places with Ernie Dingo on NITV (National Indigenous Television) and SBS.

In 2022 he performed in a celebrity tribute to Australian comedian and actor Paul Hogan, the Roast of Paul Hogan, which was broadcast on Australia's Seven Network.

== Filmography ==
=== Film ===
| Year | Title | Role | Notes |
|---|---|---|---|
| 1986 | The Blue Lightning | Pekeri | TV movie |
| 1987 | Tudawali | Robert Tudawali | Docu-drama biopic |
| 1987 | The Fringe Dwellers | Phil | Feature film |
| 1987 | A Waltz Through the Hills | Frank Smith | TV movie. Won an AFI Award for Best Actor in a Television Drama |
| 1988 | Crocodile Dundee II | Charlie | Feature film |
| 1988 | Tommy Tricker and the Stamp Traveller | Dave | Feature film |
| 1988 | Radio Redfern | Self | TV documentary film |
| 1989 | The Saint in Australia | Tour Guide | TV movie |
| 1989 | Cappuccino | Self | Feature film |
| 1991 | Until the End of the World | Burt | Feature film |
| 1993 | Blackfellas | Percy | Feature film |
| 1993 | Mr Electric | Bill | Short film |
| 1995 | Rainbow's End | Jack of all Trades | TV movie |
| 1996 | Dead Heart | David / Pastor | Feature film |
| 1996 | A Weekend in the Country | Rupert | TV movie |
| 1998 | Somewhere in the Darkness | Cowboy Joe | Feature film |
| 1998 | The Echo of Thunder | Neil | TV movie |
| 2001 | Crocodile Dundee in Los Angeles | Charlie (uncredited) | Feature film |
| 2010 | Bran Nue Dae | Stephen 'Uncle Tadpole' Johnson | Feature film |
| 2011 | Jandamarra's War | Narrator | TV documentary film |
| 2017 | Rough Stuff | Wild Dog | Film |
| 2017 | Australia Day | Floyd Mackenzie | Feature film |
| 2017 | Boar | Ernie | Feature film |
| 2025 | Kangaroo | Dave | Film |
| TBA | Trouble Down Under | Duke the Dingo | Animated film |

=== Television ===
| Year | Title | Role | Notes |
|---|---|---|---|
| 1984 | The Cowra Breakout | Murray | TV miniseries |
| 1988 | The Dirtwater Dynasty | Billy (senior) | TV miniseries |
| 1988 | Craig Goes Mad in Melbourne | Self | TV series |
| 1988 | Dreaming of Lords | Presenter | TV special |
| 1989 | Nullarbor Dreaming | Voiceover | TV special |
| 1989 | The First Australians | Narrator | TV documentary series, 1 episode |
| 1989 | Fast Forward | Various characters | TV series, season 1, 22 episodes |
| 1989 | Dolphin Cove | Didge | TV series |
| 1990 | Rafferty's Rules | Wayne Williams | TV series, 1 episode |
| 1991 | The Flying Doctors | Eric | TV series, 1 episode |
| 1991 | Clowning Around | Jack Merrick | TV miniseries |
| 1992 | Oondamooroo: A Profile of Ernie Dingo | Self | TV special |
| 1992 | Ultraman: Towards the Future | Mudjudi | TV miniseries, 1 episode |
| 1992 | Dearest Enemy | | TV series, 1 episode |
| 1992 | G.P. | Eddie | TV series, 1 episode |
| 1993 | Clowning Around 2 | Jack Merrick | TV miniseries |
| 1993-2009 | The Great Outdoors | Host | TV series |
| 1994 | Heartland (aka Burned Bridges) | Vincent Burunga | TV series, 13 episodes |
| 1995 | Heartbreak High | Vic Morris | TV series, 5 episodes |
| 1997 | Kings in Grass Castles | Jimmy | TV miniseries, 2 episodes |
| 1997 | Bullpitt! | Self | TV series, 1 episode |
| 1997 | Surprise Surprise | Self | TV series, 1 episode |
| 1999 | Kidspeak | Co-host | TV series |
| 2000 | 2000 Olympic Games Opening Ceremony | Narrator (Indigenous segment) | TV special |
| 2000/03 | Blue Heelers | Archie Garrett | TV series, 2 episodes |
| 2007 | Good as Gold | Host | TV series |
| 2007 | It Takes Two | Contestant | TV series, 9 episodes |
| 2008 | Outback Wildlife Rescue | Presenter | TV series |
| 2008 | First Australians | Performer | TV miniseries, 1 episode |
| 2009-10 | No Leave, No Life | Host | TV series, season 1 |
| 2010 | Spicks and Specks | Guest | TV series, 1 episode |
| 2012 | Family Confidential | Himself (with family) | TV documentary series, episode 3: "The Dingos" |
| 2013 | First Footprints | Narrator | TV documentary series, 4 episodes |
| 2013 | Serangoon Road | Robbo | TV series, 1 episode |
| 2013 | Redfern Now | Ernie Johnson | TV series, season 2, episode 6: "Dogs of War'" |
| 2014 | Talking Language with Ernie Dingo | Host | TV series |
| 2015 | Horizon | Narrator | TV series |
| 2016 | DNA Nation | Self | TV documentary series |
| 2017 | NITV Sunrise Ceremony | Self | TV special |
| 2017 | Newton's Law | Frank Stewart | TV miniseries, 1 episode |
| 2018 | Nyoongar Footy Magic | Presenter | TV documentary series |
| 2018 | Mystery Road | Keith Groves | TV miniseries, 5 episodes |
| 2018 | Who Do You Think You Are? | Himself | TV series, season 9, episode 7 |
| 2016-23 | Going Places with Ernie Dingo | Host | TV series, 54 episodes |
| 2022 | Roast of Paul Hogan | Himself | TV special |

== Personal life ==
Dingo's oldest daughter was born when he was 18; through her, he has two grandchildren.

Ernie Dingo married Sally Butler, then a sales representative for 2Day FM, in 1989. The couple struggled to conceive their own children via IVF in the early 1990s and later adopted a daughter and also took care of one of Ernie's grandchildren. In his appearance on Family Confidential Dingo revealed that the adopted daughter's father was another Aboriginal actor who was Dingo's cousin, David Ngoombujarra. Dingo discovered in 2004 that he had a daughter from a brief relationship before his marriage.

Sally Dingo has authored two books about her husband and family, 2000's Ernie Dingo: King of the Kids and Dingo, The Story of our Mob in 1997. Their marriage broke down in 2011 and Dingo moved to Perth.

Dingo fathered twin boys in 2015.

Dingo is a prominent supporter of Australian rules football, and in particular the West Coast Eagles.

In 2020, Dingo toured regional Western Australia to speak to Indigenous groups, which had the lowest COVID-19 vaccination rates in Western Australia. This led to him receiving threats.

Dingo is a fan of basketball, and played at state level in 1973 for the Perth Wildcats. He joined the masters games to play the game for Australia in 2022.

== Awards and honours ==
Ernie Dingo was made a Member of the Order of Australia in 1990, in recognition of his service to the performing arts.

He received the AFI Award for Best Performance by an Actor in a Leading Role in a Tele feature for A Waltz Through the Hills in 1988, after being nominated the previous year for Tudawali. He has also been nominated for an AFI/AACTA Award for Best Lead Actor in a Television Drama in 1994 for Heartland and in 2013 for Redfern Now.

== Controversy ==
In 2008, Dingo and radio host Kyle Sandilands had a feud after Sandilands used the line "a dingo ate my baby" in a promo leading up to Dingo's appearance on his show. The two patched things up, and KIIS FM donated $10,000 to the Mullewa Football Club in Western Australia.

In August 2010, the WA Police Force announced they had opened an investigation into reports of child abuse by Dingo. It was alleged that Dingo slapped and verbally abused an 11-year-old boy at Carnarvon Primary School, and then made abusive comments singling out that particular boy while speaking at a school assembly shortly afterward. Dingo denied the claims, saying: "I deny it, but until there is an outcome I can't really talk about it." He entered a plea of not guilty by endorsement in a letter to the court and a date of 3 February 2011 was set for trial in Carnarvon. However, on 18 April 2011, following a mediation session, the assault charge was dropped and the matter formally withdrawn.

In 2010, two women from New South Wales and Victoria claimed to have engaged in affairs with Dingo. It was subsequently rumoured that Ernie and Sally were living in an open marriage for the sake of their children.

== Bibliography ==
- Dingo, Sally. Dingo, The Story of our Mob. Random House Australia, 1997. ISBN 0-09-183634-4.
- Dingo, Sally. Ernie Dingo: King of the Kids. Random House Australia, 2000. ISBN 1-74051-710-5.

Media offices
| Preceded by first | No Leave, No Life host season 1 | Succeeded by James Tobin |
