= Tim Ross =

Australian comedian and radio personality

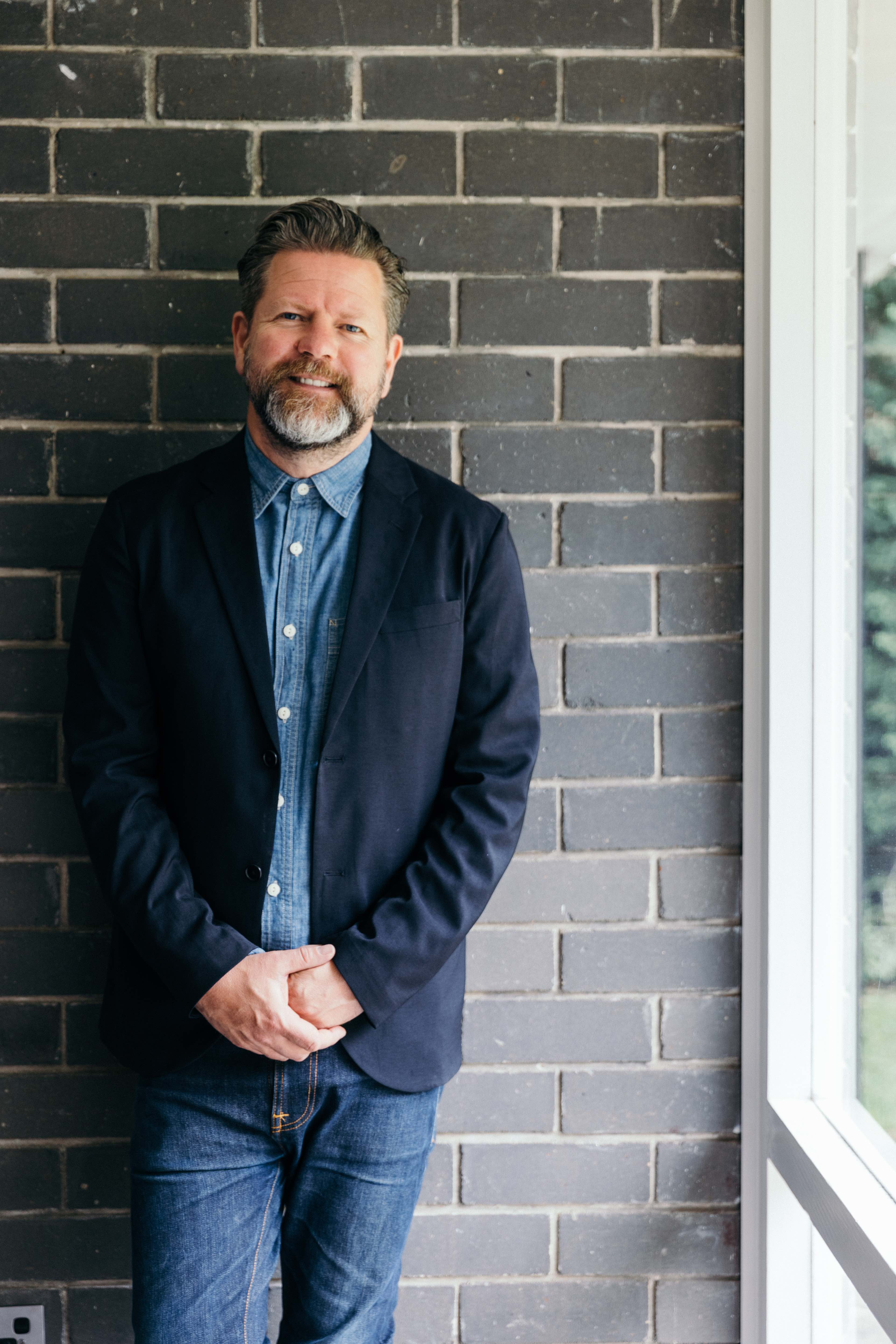
- Ross in 2011
- Born: Timothy Ross
- Other name: Rosso (nickname)
- Education: RMIT University; LaTrobe University
- Occupations: Comedian; radio host; writer; television presenter
- Known for: Merrick and Rosso comedy duo, architecture and design advocacy,

Timothy Ross (nicknamed Rosso) is an Australian comedian, radio host, writer, and television presenter. He began his career performing stand-up comedy with Merrick Watts as part of the duo Merrick and Rosso. He is known as the presenter of the ABC Television shows Streets of Your Town and Designing a Legacy, which reflect his personal enthusiasm for design and architecture.

== Early life and education ==
Ross grew up in Mount Eliza, Victoria, with his parents and two brothers.

He studied drama and music at the Royal Melbourne Institute of Technology. He then attended La Trobe University, also in Melbourne, graduating with a Bachelor of Arts majoring in history, theatre, and drama.

== Career ==
=== Live performance ===
Ross began his career in comedy, and first came together with Merrick Watts when they teamed up for a one-off comedy show in 1996. They went on to appear in stand-up together often, touring Australia and participating in many comedy festivals. They collaborated as authors too, co-authoring Merrick and Rosso, The Book and Merrick and Rosso, The Book Volume 2. As well as performing as a comedian, Ross has fronted the comedy band Black Rose, which opened the Vivofit festival in Melbourne and Sydney in 2009.

=== Radio ===
Ross began his careers with Merrick Watts at Triple J performing a weekly guest spot on the drive-time program on Triple J radio in 1998 as Merrick and Rosso. They became full-time presenters and then in 2001 they moved to newly-launched commercial radio station Nova 96.9 for the breakfast radio shift. Co-hosts on the breakfast show included Katrina Blowers, Sami Lukis, and Kate Ritchie. Ross left the successful radio program in 2009. At the end of 2011 Ross rejoined breakfast radio, signing for Sydney commercial radio station Mix 106.5 with co-host comedian Claire Hooper.

In December 2012, Mix 106.5 announced that Ross and Hooper would be replaced by a new breakfast show with Sami Lukis and Yumi Stynes in 2013. Ross was appointed Drive presenter on the Mix Network with anchor Matt Baseley.

=== Television ===
The first television series hosted by Merrick and Rosso was Planet Merrick and Rosso (later known as Super Planet Merrick and Rosso) on The Comedy Channel. They had a guest role on top rating Australian drama series All Saints in 2003. In 2003 their television show Merrick and Rosso Unplanned debuted on the Nine Network followed by The B Team on Network Ten in 2005. In 2008, they returned to the Comedy Channel with an original format entitled 'The Merrick & Rosso Show'. In 2009, Ross became a guest entertainment reporter for Nine's Today.

In 2010, he hosted Uncharted, an unsigned band competition series on MTV Australia and became the host of television series Australia Versus on the Seven Network. In 2011, Ross joined Weekend Sunrise as a Weekend All Star replacing Paul Murray. He also hosted the third season of No Leave, No Life.

In 2012, Ross was a regular contributor to entertainment and lifestyle website Live4.

In 2016, Ross presented Streets of Your Town, a two-part television documentary series about Australian modernist architecture, which was the most watched arts program on the ABC that year.

In 2021, Ross presented Designing A Legacy, a one-hour television documentary on the ABC, where Ross met with families whose lives had been shaped by iconic architecture.

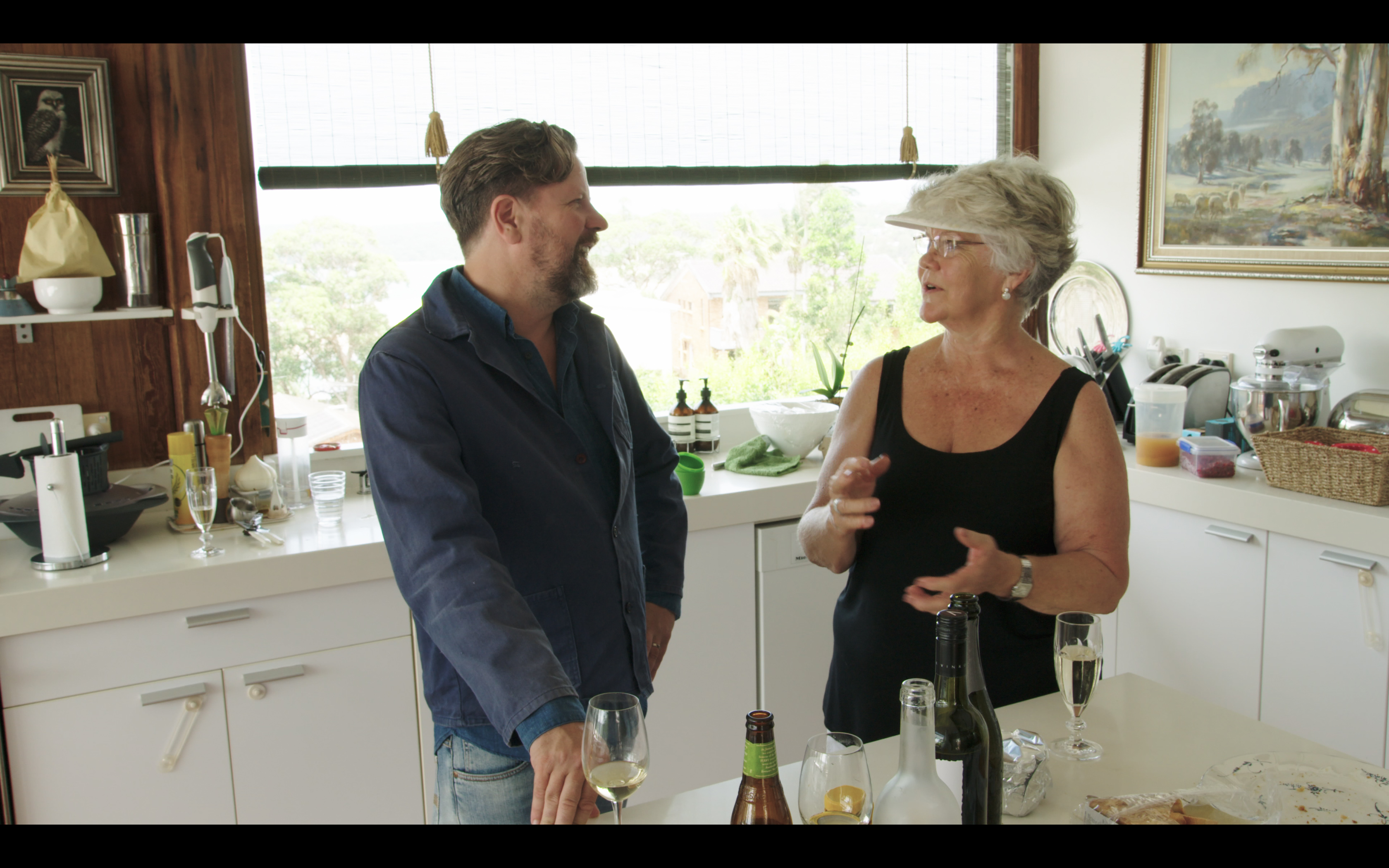
Tim Ross chats with Sandii Lyons for Designing A Legacy

=== Architecture and design ===
Ross's interest in architecture has led to speaking engagements at The 50s and 60s House Symposium (Museum of Sydney), Home Series talks (Government House), and at Sydney Design Week, and he is an ambassador for Sydney Open. In 2012 Ross became a member of the Creative Services Advisory Committee for Sydney Living Museums. He spoke at the opening of the London Design Museum, gave the Heritage Council Address in 2018 in Melbourne, was the speaker for the Griffin Lecture presented by the Australian Institute of Architects in 2018, and was a keynote speaker at the Culture of Lates Symposium in London.

In December 2018 he launched the "Home: A Suburban Obsession" exhibition at the State Library of Queensland. He collaborated with the National Archives of Australia to curate "Reception this way: motels – a sentimental journey with Tim Ross" which was displayed at the Museum of the Great Southern, Museum of the Goldfields and the Museum of Geraldton in 2025-2026.

He has written on architecture for various publications including Real Living, Habitus, The Saturday Paper, and The Guardian.

Ross has created numerous podcasts. In 2020 he released a podcast in collaboration with the Sydney Opera House, on the tapestries at the Opera House. In 2025, Ross launched a podcast with Kevin McCloud, entiled Tim & Kev's Big Design Adventure. In each episode the two hosts discuss different architectural buildings they have visited, encompassed with general conversation between friends.

=== Writing ===
In 2017, Ross launched his second book, The Rumpus Room, capturing nostalgic short stories about life in Australia's suburbs in the 1960s, 1970s and 1980s.

In collaboration with the National Archives of Australia, Ross created a coffee table book called MOTEL – Images of Australia on Holidays, released in 2019 in conjunction with his live show performed with friend Kit Warhurst.

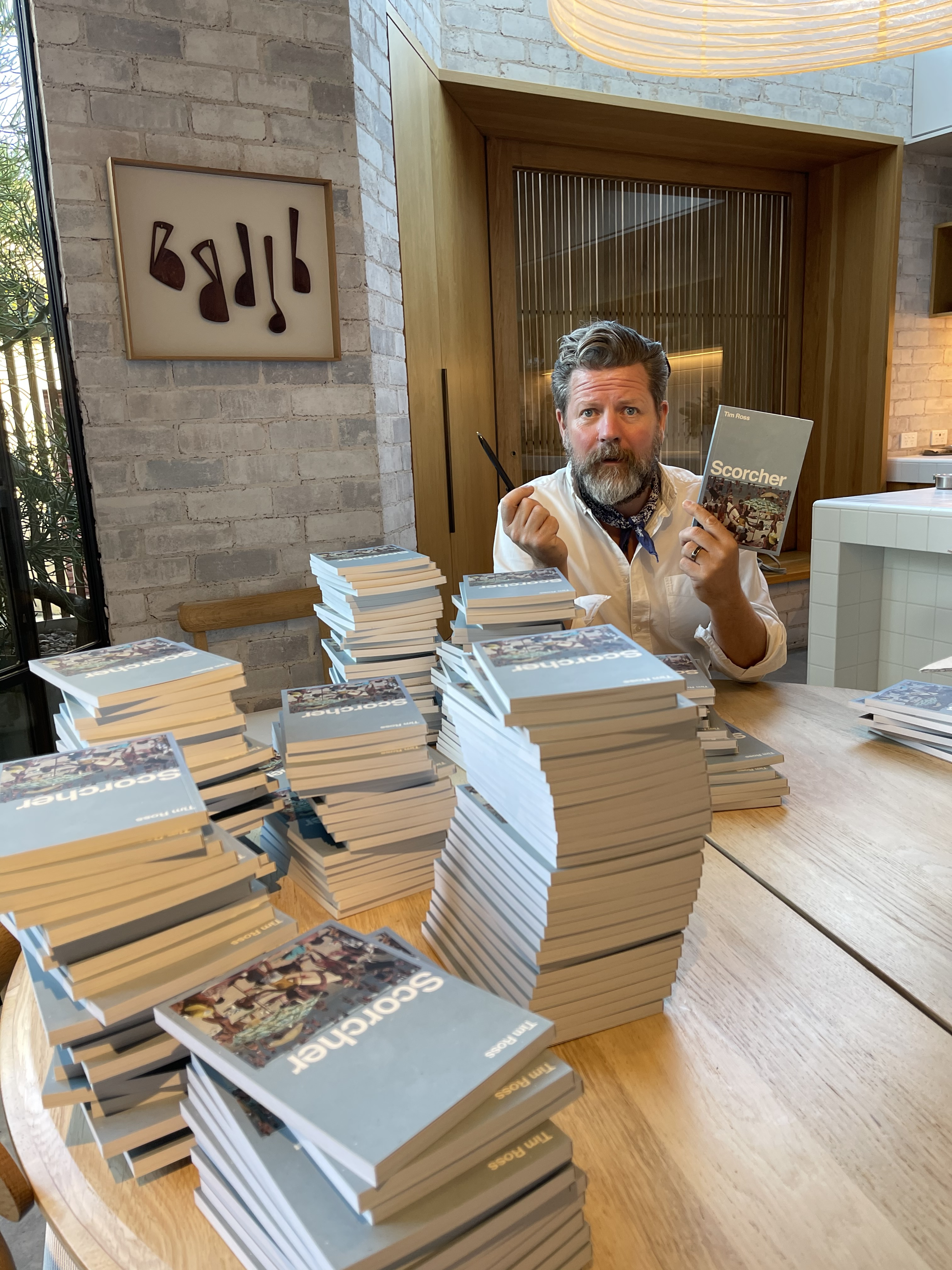
Tim Ross with his bestselling book Scorcher

Scorcher, a collection of short stories on the Australian summer of the 1970s and 1980s, was released in December 2021.

In 2025, What A Ripper! was published. The book examined everyday objects used by Australians, reflecting on their design and cultural impact.

== Recognition and honours ==
In 2019, Ross was awarded the National President's Prize by the Australian Institute of Architects for his advocacy work in architecture.

== Personal life ==
Ross married Michelle Glew-Ross and they have two sons.

== Discography ==
=== Studio albums ===
Title	Details	Peak positions
Title	Details	AUS
Choice Cuts (as Merrick and Rosso)	Release date: November 2000; Label: ABC Audio (5298442); Formats: CD	-
From Us to Youse (as Merrick and Rosso)	Release date: November 2002; Label: Sony Music (5101842000); Formats: CD	52

=== Video albums ===
Title	Details
Live And Totally Wrong (as Merrick and Rosso)	Release date: November 2007; Formats: DVD

=== Singles ===
Title	Year
"Teenage Mullet Fury" (As Merrick and Rosso with The Echuca Moama Sound Machine)	1998

== Awards and nominations ==
=== ARIA Music Awards ===
The ARIA Music Awards are a set of annual ceremonies presented by Australian Recording Industry Association (ARIA), which recognise excellence, innovation, and achievement across all genres of the music of Australia. They commenced in 1987.

Year	Nominee / work	Award	Result	Ref.
1999	Teenage Mullet Fury	ARIA Award for Best Comedy Release	Nominated	
2003	From Us to Youse	ARIA Award for Best Comedy Release	Won	
2008	Live and Totally Wrong!	ARIA Award for Best Comedy Release	Nominated	

Media offices
Preceded by James Tobin	No Leave, No Life host season 3	Succeeded by program finished
