= Go Go Stop =

Australian children's television game show

- Genre: Children's Game Show
- Created by: Michael Boughen
- Developed by: Ambience Entertainment
- Directed by: Brian Foreshaw
- Presented by: Jesse Tobin
- Country of origin: Australia
- Original language: English
- No. of series: 4
- No. of episodes: 260

Production
- Producer: Michael Boughen
- Running time: 30 minutes per episode (inc. commercials)

Original release
- Network: Seven Network
- Release: 2004 – 2007

Go Go Stop is an Australian children's game show, airing on the Seven Network, and fronted by formerThe Big Arvo co-host (and current Weekend Sunrise weather presenter Jesse Tobin. Each week, three schools compete to win a weekly prize. One student from each school appears on the show daily. The program is currently on hiatus; however repeats are shown at 2:30pm on weekdays during the NSW school holidays. At the end of each week, the school with most points wins.

== The game ==
Thirty plasma screens make up the gamezone, arranged in a rectangle five screens wide and six screens high. The players have to answer questions with two multiple-choice answers (or true-or-false questions) with control pads attached to their wrists. They can take their time, and only the correct-answering players are allowed to move down the gamezone.

At one time in the 2004 season, the audience was allowed to yell out the answer, but this was soon cancelled as the players all ended up with the audience's answer. Players cannot lose points, and the correct-answering players score points. The first player to answer correctly is the first to have a turn. Before the round, the players take up a space at the top of the gamezone, and when they answer correctly, they can take a step onto a plasma screen. Their plasma screen lights up a command. The player must obey this command.

== The contestants ==
Each of the three schools has eight students selected via auditioning at the school, five students for each day and three reserves for sick, injured or unavailable students. Sometimes having clothes with brand names on them can force a contestant to be replaced with a reserve. The students which are going to be competing are seated at the very top row of each school.

== Game-zone commands ==
Name	Command	Appears in rounds
Go	The player takes another step forward, diagonally forward, or to the side	1,2,3
Stop	The player stops on that screen, ending their turn	1,2,3
Bonus Screens	Award 10 or 15 points, depending on which round it is, then act as a stop screen	1,2
Miss A Turn	The player cannot answer the next question, and also must end their run	1,2,3
Arrows	The player must go to the screen the arrow is pointing at	1,2,3
Back Two	The player must go back two screens (directly back, not the last two screens the player was on)	2,3
No Entry	The player cannot enter the game zone at that screen, and must select a new entry position (only on the top row of screens)	2,3
Start Again	The player must step off the game zone and start the game again (without losing points)	3
Swap Places	The two players on the game zone must switch places. In the 2004/2005 seasons, the players took each other's turns and this screen acted as a stop, but in 2006/2007 this screen meant nothing but to swap places, so runs were continued.	3
Try Again	The player must go back to the bottom of the gamezone and select a new question. He/She has not won a prize for the preceding question	4

== Rounds ==
=== Round 1 ===
Round 1 is called Three-Way Scramble, because there are three players. Answering a question correctly scores 10 points, and stepping off the game zone scores 25 points.

The three players must be lined up in front of the three plasma TVs where there are three white dots.

=== Round 2 ===
Round 2 is similar to round 1, except correct answers are worth 15 points. In round 2, there are more hazards on the game zone, which makes it harder to get to the end of the gamezone. This is the first elimination round of the game, and the player with the lowest score leaves.

=== Round 3 ===
Round 3 is called Head to Head. There are only two players in this round in result to the name head to head, as one was eliminated in round 2. Answering a question correctly is worth 20 points, and stepping off the game zone is worth 50 points. The player with the lowest score is eliminated. In the event of a tie, two different games have been played. In 2004/2005 the tied players stand facing away from each other, with the host between. He asks a true or false question, and the players put thumbs up for true, and thumbs down for false. When one player gets the question correct, they win, hence they move on. In 2006/2007 the host would read a series of clues for a famous person or thing. If a contestant thinks that they know the answer, they yell the name of their school, to get the host's attention, and then they will have the chance to answer. A correct answer results in the player winning the tiebreaker. An incorrect answer would win it to their opposition.

In this round the 2 remaining players stand on the right and left dots in front of the plasma TVs.

=== Round 4 ===
Round 4 is called Run for Fun. The top scoring player goes to Round 4. This round is for the winner to win prizes for themselves. There are five questions in five categories to choose from, which are true or false questions. Five prizes are hidden in the game zone, and before the round begins are revealed for a few seconds.

The round lasts for 60 seconds. The player stands on a category, which are on the five plasma screens at the front of the game zone. They then must yell out the name of the category, and the host reads the question to them. Once the question has been read out, the player must run to the other end of the game zone and jump on a screen that says "true" or "false" and yell out the word.

If they are correct, the player can jump on the screen they think has a prize. The player must yell "STOP" to reveal the screen. If it has a prize, the player wins it. If not, the category cannot be used again, and the contestant, if time permits, whether they have won a prize or not, can choose another category. The round ends when time runs out, when the player has won all five prizes, or when all categories have been used. If the player has found no prizes, then they'll receive a consolation prize (the same awarded to the player who gets eliminated in the second round).

After all rounds players and the host must stand in the position marked on the ground by white dots.

== Questions ==
Questions on Go Go Stop are always asked with a multiple choice of two answers. Typically, these questions are fairly trivial, and often ask the children a comparative question about two unrelated quantities – e.g. which is heavier: the largest gold nugget ever found, or an average gorilla? – or a true or false question. As such, children with a high level of general knowledge do not necessarily have an advantage in the game.

Although never actively mentioned during the show, the questions become significantly easier, almost to be point of being blatantly obvious, to promote correct answers when the game is taking too long.

== International variants ==
Country	Title	Network	Presenter
Belgium	Go Go Stop	Ketnet	Peter Pype
Ireland	Bog Stop	TG4	Máire Treasa Ní Dhubhghaill

=== Belgium ===
Kanakna produced a version in Flemish, also called Go Go Stop, presented by Peter Pype. The series was broadcast on Ketnet, on weekdays at 6:30 pm, beginning in November 2007.

=== Ireland ===
Abú Media produces a version in Irish, called Bog Stop, presented by Máire Treasa Ní Dhubhghaill, for TG4. The shows are recorded in the Black Box Theatre in Galway, around April, for broadcasting in January to June of the following year. The fourth series was recorded in April 2010 was broadcast on TG4 on Mondays, Wednesdays and Fridays at 4:30 pm.

For the first series, five students from each school took part, with the shows being broadcast Monday to Friday, featuring three different schools each week. Later, the schedule was changed to Mondays, Wednesdays and Fridays, with six students from each school competing, and with three schools being featured for two consecutive weeks.
