= The Week the Women Went (American TV series) =

- Country of origin: United States
- Original language: English
- No. of seasons: 1
- No. of episodes: 5

Production
- Executive producer: Jon Kroll
- Producer: BBC Worldwide Productions
- Production location: United States

Original release
- Network: Lifetime
- Release: August 14 – September 11, 2012

Related
- The Week the Women Went

The Week The Women Went is a 2012 reality series narrated by Jeff Foxworthy on the Lifetime Channel and produced by BBC Worldwide Productions. The show is an American version of a BBC show of the same name.

== Premise ==
The show follows the town of Yemassee, South Carolina as all of the adult women in the community leave for a week. The men are then left on their own to take on the responsibilities of the women, which includes childcare, house cleaning, and employment.

== Episodes ==
| No. | Title | Original release date |
|---|---|---|
| 1 | "'Til Trains Do Us Part" | August 14, 2012 |
| 2 | "PEARLs Gone Wild" | August 21, 2012 |
| 3 | "It Takes a Village" | August 28, 2012 |
| 4 | "Mister Congeniality" | September 4, 2012 |
| 5 | "Hug O' War" | September 11, 2012 |

== Reception and criticisms ==
Hit Fix criticized the show's premise of being a "social experiment", stating that it felt more like a sitcom, that it perpetuated stereotypes of both men and Southerners, and that "losing fifty percent of the adults in town is going to create a hardship, regardless of whether they're male or female". Other criticisms focused on the helplessness of the men in the show, with one person stating that "I get that it is supposed to be a fish out of water story ... but if you have a 9-year-old daughter and you cannot brush her hair, you aren't a fish out of water. You are a bad father".
