= Merrick Watts =

Australian comedian (born 1973)

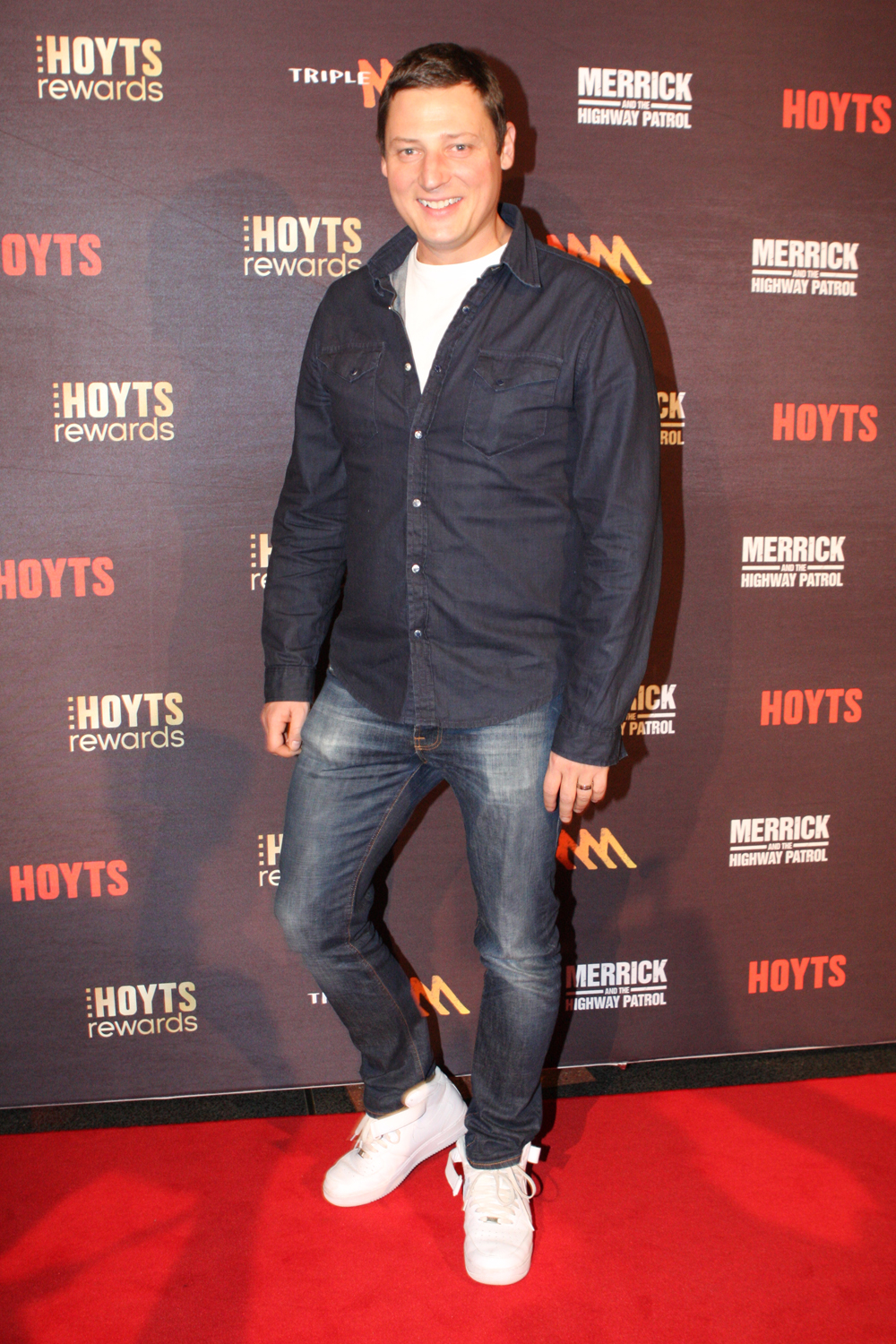
- Watts in 2012
- Born: 18 November 1973 (age 52); Melbourne, Victoria, Australia
- Occupations: Comedian, radio and television presenter
- Years active: 1996−present
- Spouse: Georgie Sulzberger (m. 2006)
- Children: 2
- Website: http://www.merrickwatts.com.au/

Merrick Watts (born 18 November 1973) is an Australian comedian, radio and television presenter. He is best known for performing stand-up comedy and radio works as part of the comedy duo Merrick and Rosso with Tim Ross.

== Career ==
=== Stand up ===
Watts began his career in comedy and first came together with Tim Ross when they teamed up for a one off comedy show in 1996. They had many stand-up shows and comedy tours across Australia and appeared at many comedy festivals. They also published the comedy books Merrick and Rosso, The Book and Merrick and Rosso, The Book Volume 2.

=== Radio ===
Watts began his radio career with Tim Ross at Triple J performing a weekly guest spot on the drive-time program on Triple J radio in 1998 as Merrick and Rosso. They became full-time presenters and then in 2001 they moved to newly launched commercial radio station Nova 96.9 for the breakfast radio shift. Co-hosts on the breakfast show included Katrina Blowers, Sami Lukis and Kate Ritchie. Ross left the successful radio program in 2009.

Merrick continued on the breakfast show in 2010 with new co-hosts Scott Dooley and Ricki-Lee Coulter, although he announced on 24 August 2011 that he was leaving the show and the station on 2 September 2011.-

In September 2011, Watts signed with Triple M. He was the host of a drive & night show called Merrick and the Highway Patrol with Rachel Corbett and Julian 'Jules' Schiller. The radio program was cancelled due to poor ratings and came to an end in November 2013.

In late 2013, it was announced that Merrick would co-host the new Breakfast program on 2Day FM alongside Jules Lund & Sophie Monk with Mel B, replacing The Kyle and Jackie O Show.

In October 2014, Southern Cross Austereo announced that Jules, Merrick & Sophie on 2Day FM would be axed due to poor ratings throughout the year and replaced by The Dan & Maz Show.

In 2015, Watts returned to Triple M to host his own drive show, Merrick and Australia which was later renamed Merrickville.

In 2019 he hosted the true crime podcast Police Tape.

=== Television ===
The first television series hosted by Merrick and Rosso was Planet Merrick and Rosso (later known as Super Planet Merrick and Rosso) on The Comedy Channel. They had a guest role on top rating Australian drama series All Saints in 2003. In 2003 their television show Merrick and Rosso Unplanned debuted on the Nine Network followed by The B Team on Network Ten in 2005. In 2008, they returned to the Comedy Channel with an original format entitled The Merrick & Rosso Show.

Watts had a regular role in the 2008 television comedy series The Hollowmen as Nick, a senior adviser to the prime minister. In 2009 he played the small but crucial part of Marty Johnstone in Underbelly: A Tale of Two Cities.

Watts has made guest appearances on the television shows Thank God You're Here, Rove Live, ADbc, Studio 10, The Project, All Star Family Feud, Celebrity Name Game, Show Me the Movie!, Have You Been Paying Attention?, The Cheap Seats and Hughesy, We Have a Problem.

In 2013 Watts hosted the 8 part ABC1 TV show Tractor Monkeys.

In 2020, Watts participated the Seven Network's reality program SAS Australia, where he passed selection alongside two other contestants, Sabrina Frederick and Nick 'Honey Badger' Cummins . In the same year, Merrick Watts appears in the series Operation Buffalo as Captain Jack Allen for one episode.

== Filmography ==
TV/Film
Year	Title	Role	Notes	Ref
2024	Plum	Wocko	1 episode	
2020	Operation Buffalo (TV series)	Jack Allen	1 episode	
2019	Get Krack!n	Mark	1 episode	
2018	Street Smart	Drug Officer	1 episode	
2013	Mr & Mrs Murder	Keith Skinner	1 episode	
2011	Shark; Broken Seal	Voice	Short	
2009	Underbelly (TV series)	Marty Johnson	1 episode	
2008	The Hollowmen	Nick	12 episodes	
2003	All Saints (TV series)	Lawry	1 episode	

=== Other appearances ===
Year	Title	Role	Notes
1997	Planet Rosco and Merrick	Self	13 episodes
1999	Super Planet Merrick and Rosco	Self	6 episodes
1999	Rove	Self	1 episode
1999	Rage	Self	1 episode
2013	Tractor Monkeys	Self	8 episodes
2020	SAS Australia	Self	12 episodes
2021-22	Celebrity Letters and Numbers	Self	8 episodes
2018-21	Hughesy We Have A Problem	Self	7 episodes

Writer/Producer
Year	Title	Role	Notes
2013	Tractor Monkeys	Writer/Producer	8 episodes
2008-09	The Merrick and Rosco Show	Writer	16 episodes
2007	Merrick and Rosco Live and Totally Wrong!	Writer/Producer	
2005	Merrick and Rosco The B Team	Writer	8 episodes
2003-04	Merrick and Rosco Unplanned	Producer	10 episodes
1999	Super Planet Merrick and Rosco	Writer	6 episodes
1997	Planet Merrick and Rosco		13 episodes

== Other work ==
Merrick voiced a cartoon shark in the 2011 Movie Extra animated series "Shaaark".

== Personal life ==
Watts married Georgie Sulzberger in 2006. They have a son and a daughter.

He was educated at Eltham High School and Diamond Valley College

== Discography ==
=== Studio albums ===
Title	Details	Peak positions
Title	Details	AUS
Choice Cuts (as Merrick and Rosso)	Release date: November 2000; Label: ABC Audio (5298442); Formats: CD	-
From Us to Youse (as Merrick and Rosso)	Release date: November 2002; Label: Sony Music (5101842000); Formats: CD	52

=== Video albums ===
Title	Details
Live And Totally Wrong (as Merrick and Rosso)	Release date: November 2007; Formats: DVD

=== Singles ===
Title	Year
"Teenage Mullet Fury" (As Merrick and Rosso with The Echuca Moama Sound Machine)	1998

== Awards and nominations ==
=== ARIA Music Awards ===
The ARIA Music Awards are a set of annual ceremonies presented by Australian Recording Industry Association (ARIA), which recognise excellence, innovation, and achievement across all genres of the music of Australia. They commenced in 1987.

Year	Nominee / work	Award	Result	Ref.
1999	Teenage Mullet Fury	ARIA Award for Best Comedy Release	Nominated	
2003	From Us to Youse	ARIA Award for Best Comedy Release	Won	
2008	Live and Totally Wrong!	ARIA Award for Best Comedy Release	Nominated	

=== Other Awards ===
Year	Award	State	Category
2017	Perth Fringe Festival	Nominee	Best Comedy Show
2016	ACRA Awards	Winner	Best Documentary, Modern Warrior, Triple M Network
2009	ACRA Awards	Winner	Best Station Produced Comedy Segment
2009	ASTRA Awards	Winner	Most Popular Male Talent – Merrick & Rosso
2005	TV Week Logies	Nominated	Merrick and Rosso Unplanned – Most popular Light Entertainment Program
2004	ACRA Awards	Winner	Best on Air Team
2003	ACRA Awards	Winner	Best on Air Team (Metro)
2003	GQ Man of the Year Award	Winner	Comedians of the Year – Merrick & Rosso
