= Every Little Thing (film) =

2024 documentary film

- Poster
- Directed by: Sally Aitken
- Written by: Sally Aitken
- Produced by: Bettina Dalton; Oli Harbottle; Anna Godas
- Starring: Terry Masear
- Cinematography: Nathan Barlow; Dan Freene; Ann Johnson Prum
- Edited by: Tania Michel Nehme
- Music by: Caitlin Yeo
- Production companies: Wildbear Entertainment; HHMI Tangled Bank Studios
- Distributed by: Dogwoof
- Release date: 2024
- Country: Australia
- Language: English
- Box office: $245,389

Every Little Thing is a 2024 Australian documentary film about hummingbird rehabilitator Terry Masear. It was directed by Sally Aitken.

== Reception ==
On the review aggregator website Rotten Tomatoes, 95% of 42 critics' reviews are positive, with an average rating of 7.8/10. The website's consensus reads: "Gentle as a hummingbird and full of worldly wisdom, Every Little Thing is a life-affirming documentary about recognizing the worth of even the tiniest creatures." Metacritic, which uses a weighted average, assigned the film a score of 74 out of 100, based on nine critics, indicating "generally favorable" reviews.

Andrew Stafford of The Guardian gave the film four out of five stars and wrote, "It's a shimmering, densely layered film about love and resilience, about how we live with and recover from trauma, and about letting go."
