= Justin Rosniak =

Australian actor

- Born: Sydney, New South Wales, Australia
- Occupation: Actor
- Years active: 1987–present

Justin Rosniak is an Australian television and film actor, best known for his appearances in the television series Packed to the Rafters, Police Rescue, Squinters, and Mr Inbetween.

== Career ==
Rosniak appeared as Tony in 1997's Spellbinder: Land of the Dragon Lord, and in the same year voiced the title role in the animated television series The Adventures of Sam.

He has appeared in Home and Away three times, in 1988 as Ben McPhee, the grandson of regular character's Neville and Floss McPhee, in 1995 as Joseph Lynch, and in 2018 as Ross Nixon.

In 1991 Rosniak played David Maguire alongside Bryan Brown and Karen Allen in the Australian movie Sweet Talker.

In 2010, Rosniak was cast in a supporting role in Animal Kingdom and in 2011 was in Underbelly: Razor, playing the part of notorious Australian career criminal, Squizzy Taylor.

In 2018, Rosniak was one of the regular cast members in the comedy series Squinters.

Rosniak appears in the 2019 Australian crime-thriller film Locusts.

In 2023, Rosniak joined filming for the Nicolas Cage led The Surfer. Rosniak was also part of the cast for Paramount Plus series Last King of the Cross.

On 19 August 2024, Rosniak was named as part of the extended cast for the Australian adaptation of The Office.

== Filmography ==
=== Film ===
Year	Title	Role	Notes	Ref
1991	Sweet Talker	David Maguire	Feature film	
2000	Sample People	Joey	Feature film	
2002	New Skin	Bottleshop Guy	Feature film	
2008	Netherland Dwarf	Pet Shop Man	Short film	
2008	The List	Gaff	Short film	
2010	Animal Kingdom	Detective Randall Roache	Feature film	
2011	Waiting for Robbo	Col	Short film	
2014	Florence Has Left the Building	Red Elvis	Short film	
2016	Broke	Neck	Feature film	
2016	Partners in Crime	(did not appear as actor)	Short film (director, producer, writer)	
2016	Down Under	Ditch	Feature film	
2016	Exhale	Jason	Short film	
2017	Dirty Bird	Eddie	Short film	
2017	Red Handed	Constable Morrow	Short film	
2017	Common Scents	Max Mellie	Short film (also producer)	
2017	War Machine	Colonel Derek Bogg (uncredited)	Feature film	
2017	No Appointment Necessary	Dick Warner	Feature film	
2019	Locusts	Benny	Feature film	
2024	The Surfer	The Cop	Feature film	

=== Television ===
Year	Title	Role	Notes	Ref
1987	A Country Practice	Ian Carruthers, Jr.	Season 7 (2 episodes)	
1988	Home and Away	Ben McPhee	Season 1 (12 episodes)	
1989	Rafferty's Rules	Hamish	Season 5 (1 episode)	
1989	G.P.	Tim Jenkins	Season 1 (1 episode)	
1990	Sky Tracker	Mike Masters	TV film	
1991	Eggshells	Jake Rose	TV series	
1992	A Country Practice	Chris Warner	Season 12 (2 episodes)	
1992	More Winners	Prince Wilton	Season 2 (1 episode)	
1993–96	Police Rescue	Sam	Seasons 3–5 (4 episodes)	
1993	Big Ideas	Jimmy Kovak	TV film	
1994	Escape from Jupiter	Gerard	13 episodes	
1995	G.P.	Peter Milanakos	Season 7 (1 episode)	
1995	Home and Away	Joe Lynch	Season 8 (21 episodes)	
1996	Naked: Stories of Men	Sean Furlong	1 episode	
1997	Water Rats	Kingsley	Season 2 (1 episode)	
1997	Return to Jupiter	Gerard	13 episodes	
1997	Spellbinder: Land of the Dragon Lord	Tony	Season 1 (6 episodes)	
1997	Mirror, Mirror II	Silas Pinbody	1 episode	
1997	Ketchum	Voice	Animated TV series	
1997	Frontier	Sylvester 'Wessie' Fraser	Miniseries	
1997	Doom Runners	Kid	TV film	
1998	Blue Heelers	Craig Perry	Season 8 (2 episodes)	
1999	The Adventures of Sam	Sam Donahue (voice)	Season 1	
1999	Water Rats	Wayne	Season 4 (1 episode)	
1999	Murder Call	Luchano Andrea	Season 3 (1 episode)	
2001	Do or Die	Justin	Miniseries (2 episodes)	
2001–02	McLeod's Daughters	Mark Howard	Seasons 1 & 2 (2 episodes)	
2002	All Saints	Denny Denisovich	Season 5 (1 episode)	
2002	Young Lions	Noel Jarvine	Season 1 (2 episodes)	
2003	White Collar Blue	Bobby Manel	Season 2 (1 episode)	
2004	Fireflies	Steve	Season 1 (2 episodes)	
2005–06	The Adventures of Bottle Top Bill and Corky	Various (voice)	Season 1 (2 episodes)	
2007	Dangerous	Kevin	Season 1 (2 episodes)	
2007	Raggs	Raggs	51 episodes	
2008	Scorched	Policeman #4	TV film	
2008–12	Packed to the Rafters	Stuart "Warney" Warne	Seasons 1–4 (21 episodes)	
2010–11	Rush	Tompkinson ("Thommo")	Seasons 3 & 4 (2 episodes)	
2012	Laid	Johnny	Season 2 (6 episodes)	
2018–19	Squinters	Macca	Seasons 1 & 2 (12 episodes)	
2018	Pilot Week	Football Club President	Pilot episode	
2018–21	Mr Inbetween	Gary Thomas	TV series	
2018–19	Home and Away	Ross Nixon	Seasons 31 & 32 (9 episodes)	
2019	Les Norton	Eddie Salita	10 episodes	
2020	Halifax: Retribution	Anton Bungart	2 episodes	
2021	Spreadsheet	Dale	1 episode	
2023	Last King of the Cross	Declan Mooney	9 episodes	
2023	Wolf Like Me	Robert	3 episodes	
2024–2026	Colin from Accounts	Alistair "Heavy" Crapp	5 episodes	
2024–2026	Thou Shall Not Steal	Steve		
2024–2026	The Office	Phil		

== Stage ==
Year	Title	Role	Notes
2010	Men		Fortyfivedownstairs, Melbourne with Straight Jacket Productions
2012–2013	I'm Your Man		Belvoir Street Theatre, Sydney, Carriageworks, Sydney, Waterside Hall, Port Adelaide, Brown's Mart Theatre, Darwin, Butter Factory Theatre, Wodonga, Lennox Theatre, Parramatta
