= Australia Versus =

- Created by: FremantleMedia Australia
- Presented by: Tim Ross
- Country of origin: Australia
- No. of seasons: 1
- No. of episodes: 4

Production
- Running time: 120 minutes per episode (including commercials)

Original release
- Network: Seven Network
- Release: 6 July – 27 July 2010

Australia Versus is an Australian show hosted by Tim Ross that initially aired on 6 July 2010. The format mixes archival footage of the listed events with comments from various Australian and international comedians, in a similar style to television series 20 to 1. The show is produced by FremantleMedia Australia.

== Format ==
Australian comedians take on comedians from other countries such as England, Ireland or the US to debate a number of subjects. The battle sees comedians patriotically argue and sledge their way through a series of subject rounds, while contemporary and historical archive clips back up their arguments. An impartial panel of international judges from 17 countries determines a winner of each round and the overall winning country at the end of the show.

Comedians representing Australia include Anh Do, Julia Morris, Fiona O'Loughlin, Peter Helliar, Peter Berner, Jo Stanley, Rebel Wilson, Corinne Grant, Heath Franklin, Dave Thornton, Greig Pickhaver, Joel Creasey and Jim Jefferies. The first episode features Australia vs England in the category of Film on topics such as Hottest Rising Star, Top Frock, Funniest Flick, Scariest Villain, Best Bond and Toughest Tough Guy. The second episode features Australia vs England in the category of Music.

== Episodes ==
=== Summary ===
Episode #	Original Date aired	Category	Countries & points				Australian Viewers	Nightly ranking
1	6 July 2010	Film	Australia		England		623,000	26th
2	13 July 2010	Music	Australia	5	England	7	245,000	46th
3	20 July 2010	Sexiness	Australia		USA
4	27 July 2010	Commercial ads	Australia		England

Winning Country
Losing Country

=== Episode results ===
==== Episode 1 ====
Original date aired	Category	Countries
6 July 2010	Film	Australia	England
Topic	Australia	England
Hottest Rising Star
Top Frock
Funniest Flick
Scariest Villain	Heath Ledger	Ralph Fiennes
Best Bond
Toughest Tough Guy

==== Episode 2 ====
Original date aired	Category	Countries
13 July 2010	Music	Australia	5	England	7
Topic	Australia	England
Top Pop-Star	Kylie Minogue	Robbie Williams
Hottest Boy Band	Human Nature	Take That
Sexiest Video
Wildest Festival	Big Day Out	Glastonbury
Best Karaoke Song

==== Episode 3 ====
Original date aired	Category	Countries
20 July 2010	Sexiness	Australia	USA
Topic	Australia	USA
Yummiest Mummy
Most Eligible Bachelor
Top Model
Most Sizzling Song
Sexiest Accent

==== Episode 4 ====
Original date aired	Category	Countries
27 July 2010	Commercial	Australia	England
Topic	Australia	England
Sexiest Ad
Catchiest Jingle
Funniest Ad
Best Loved Character
Most Viral Ad
