= Return to Jupiter =

- Genre: Science fiction
- Written by: David Ogilvy
- Directed by: Robert Klenner; Paul Faint
- Starring: Steve Bisley; Arthur Dignam; Justin Rosniak; Daniel Taylor; Anna Choy
- Composer: Ian Davidson
- Country of origin: Australia
- Original language: English
- No. of seasons: 1
- No. of episodes: 13

Production
- Executive producers: Kagari Tajima; Ron Saunders
- Producer: Terry Jennings
- Cinematography: Louis Irving
- Editor: Christopher Spurr
- Running time: 25 minutes
- Production company: Film Australia

Original release
- Network: ABC; NHK
- Release: 23 March – 15 June 1997

Return to Jupiter is an Australian television series, a 13-part follow-up to Escape from Jupiter. It aired in Australia from 23 March to 15 June 1997.

== Plot ==
After their escape from Io, Michael, Kumiko, Gerard and Anna, last seen in Escape From Jupiter, are reunited on the Icarus, a solar cruiser that will take them back to their parents on Ganymede, one of Jupiter's moons. But the journey is far from a smooth one. Danger and excitement wait around every turn, as the children face a crash landing on Mars, hitch a ride on an asteroid, and race against two villains whose evil plan jeopardises the Icarus and its crew.

== Cast ==
- Sonia Todd as Cmdr Edwina Dent
- David Wenham as Dr. Chrobak
- Jeanette Cronin as Glovic
- Colin Moody as Tobias Selby
- Anna Choy as Kumiko
- Justin Rosniak as Gerard
- Daniel Taylor as Michael
- Dominic Elmaloglou as Abraham
- Robyn MacKenzie as Anna
- Emma Jane Fowler as Zac
- Bruce Spence as Ed Unit

== Episodes ==
Episode information retrieved from IMDB.

No.	Title	Directed by	Written by	Original release date
1	"Shipwreck"	Robert Klenner	David Ogilvy	8 June 1997
2	"Quarantine"	Robert Klenner	David Ogilvy	15 June 1997
3	"Stowaway"	Robert Klenner	David Ogilvy	22 June 1997
4	"Rescue"	Paul Faint	David Ogilvy	29 June 1997
5	"Demons"	Paul Faint	David Ogilvy	6 July 1997
6	"Moonlighting"	Paul Faint	David Ogilvy	13 July 1997
7	"Hacker"	Paul Faint	David Ogilvy	20 July 1997
8	"Jettison"	Robert Klenner	David Ogilvy	27 July 1997
9	"Virtual Trust"	Robert Klenner	David Ogilvy	3 August 1997
10	"Ghosts"	Robert Klenner	David Ogilvy	10 August 1997
11	"Comet"	Robert Klenner	David Ogilvy	17 August 1997
12	"Terminex"	Robert Klenner	David Ogilvy	24 August 1997
13	"Space Pirates"	Robert Klenner	David Ogilvy	31 August 1997

== See also ==
- List of Australian television series
