= Merrick and Rosso =

Australian comedy duo

- Notable work: The Merrick & Rosso Show (TV); Planet Merrick and Rosso (Television); Merrick and Rosso Unplanned (TV); Triple J drive program (radio); Nova 96.9 (radio breakfast program)

Comedy career
- Medium: Radio, television, DVDs, books, tours, podcast
- Genre: Stand-up comedy
- Former members: Merrick Watts; Tim Ross

Merrick and Rosso were an Australian comedy duo active from 1996 to 2009, composed of Merrick Watts (Merrick) and Tim Ross (Rosso). The duo began in stand up comedy, and first came together when they teamed up for what was intended to be a one-off comedy show in 1996. They are best known for their syndicated radio programs, TV shows, stand up comedy tours, comedy DVDs and books.

== Radio program ==
Merrick and Rosso first came to prominence on radio Triple J performing a weekly guest spot on the drive-time program in 1998. They became full-time presenters for that segment for the next two years; regulars on their show included Myf Warhurst and Peter Helliar.

In 2001, they moved to newly launched commercial radio station Nova 96.9 for the breakfast radio shift (6am to 9am). They remained in this time slot from the station's launch until the show's end. Sami Lukis at one time served as a co-host until she moved to Brisbane at the end of 2007. In 2008, actress Kate Ritchie began to co-host the show.

In 2009, previous co-host Lukis started co-hosting a breakfast program on Triple M in Sydney, directly competing with Merrick and Rosso. On 10 November 2009, Ross announced his impending departure from the Merrick, Rosso & Kate breakfast show. Ritchie also announced her departure from the show, while Watts planned to continue on radio. Ross's departure ended an 11-year radio partnership with Watts. Merrick and Rosso's final radio show as a duo on Nova 969 took place on 4 December 2009. Tributes were paid to them by comedians including Peter Helliar and Judith Lucy, as well as celebrities such as Tom Williams and Ray Hadley. Snippets of the duo's favourite prank calls were played, as well as an audio montage of highlights from the past nine years.

== Television programs ==
Their first foray into television was a short-lived pay TV show, Planet Merrick and Rosso (later known as Super Planet Merrick and Rosso) on The Comedy Channel. In 2003 their television show Merrick and Rosso Unplanned debuted on the Nine Network, based on the antiformat established by Baddiel and Skinner Unplanned in the UK. It featured comedy, chat and audience interaction which ran for three seasons. In 2005, Merrick and Rosso starred in the television series The B Team on Network Ten. On 7 July 2007 they presented at Live Earth.

Merrick Watts has also appeared in the comedy series The Hollowmen and Thank God You're Here. In 2008, the duo starred in a new comedy series, The Merrick & Rosso Show on The Comedy Channel. He has also appeared as Marty Johnstone, a New Zealand drug dealer who was originally the leader of the Mr Asia drug syndicate in the hit series Underbelly: A Tale of Two Cities.

== The Merrick & Rosso Show ==
In 2008, Merrick and Rosso returned to Australia's Comedy Channel with an original format entitled The Merrick & Rosso Show. A mixture of sketches, stunts and parodies, often featuring the guest star, it quickly became the highest rating show in the channel's fifteen-year history. Guests throughout the first season were Ray Martin, Brendan Cowell, Kate Ritchie, The Veronicas, Stephen Curry, Ian Thorpe, Ryan 'Fitzy' Fitzgerald, Peter Helliar, Hugh Jackman, Dicko and Judith Lucy.

One popular sketch that picked up a following on YouTube and FunnyorDie was 'The Almost Transformers' which featured the stars disguised as a fridge and a washing machine for the purpose of terrifying shoppers. Another stunt included adopting an entire village in PNG (a popular trend amongst Hollywood celebrities) and renaming it Merrick & Rosso Land, distributing T-shirts bearing slogans such as "Sorry Madonna, I'm Taken", "Angelina Rejected Me" and "Property of Merrick And Rosso".

Guests for the second series included Will Ferrell, The Wiggles, Ed Phillips, Tommy Williams, Magda Szubanski, Bob Evans, Eskimo Joe, David Wenham, Asher Keddie, Charlotte Dawson and Alex Perry, Antonia Kidman and cricketer Stuart MacGill.

The show also created the anti-testimonial, where big-name celebrity guests who came into the Nova studios were given (often scripted) material and invited to explain why they could not or did not want to appear on the TV show. Anti-Testimonials were given by Will Smith, Lily Allen, Russell Brand, Chris Rock, Ryan Reynolds, Kelly Clarkson, Rhys Darby, Seth Rogen, Macy Gray, Eric Hutchinson and Cesar Millan.

== Podcast ==
Apart from the official Nova 96.9 breakfast show podcast, Merrick & Rosso also recorded their own podcast Original Pirate Material on a daily basis. Their podcast is a mix of email reading, uncensored material and prank calls. The last Original Pirate Material podcast was published on 15 November 2006.

== Discography ==
=== Studio albums ===
Title	Details	Peak positions
Title	Details	AUS
Choice Cuts	Release date: November 2000; Label: ABC Audio (5298442); Formats: CD	—
From Us to Youse	Release date: November 2002; Label: Sony Music (5101842000); Formats: CD	52

=== Video albums ===
Title	Details
Live and Totally Wrong	Release date: November 2007; Formats: DVD

=== Singles ===
Title	Year
"Teenage Mullet Fury" (with The Echuca Moama Sound Machine)	1998

== Awards and nominations ==
=== ARIA Music Awards ===
The ARIA Music Awards are a set of annual ceremonies presented by Australian Recording Industry Association (ARIA), which recognise excellence, innovation, and achievement across all genres of the music of Australia. They commenced in 1987.

Year	Nominee / work	Award	Result	Ref.
1999	Teenage Mullet Fury	Best Comedy Release	Nominated	
2003	From Us to Youse	Best Comedy Release	Won	
2008	Live and Totally Wrong!	Best Comedy Release	Nominated	
