= Escape from Jupiter =

Television series

- Genre: Science fiction
- Created by: Martin Daley; David Ogilvy; John Patterson
- Written by: Martin Daley; David Ogilvy; John Patterson
- Directed by: Fumitaka Tamura; Kate Woods
- Starring: Steve Bisley; Arthur Dignam; Justin Rosniak; Daniel Taylor; Anna Choy
- Composer: Ian Davidson
- Country of origin: Australia
- Original language: English
- No. of seasons: 1
- No. of episodes: 13

Production
- Executive producers: Kagari Tajima; Ron Saunders
- Producer: Terry Jennings
- Editor: Kerry Regan
- Running time: 30 minutes
- Production company: Film Australia

Original release
- Network: ABC; NHK
- Release: 26 November 1994 – 11 March 1995

Escape from Jupiter is an Australian children's science fiction drama which aired from 26 November 1994 to 11 March 1995 on ABC. Concerning a small group of children on Jupiter's moon Io, the series ran for 13 episodes.

When one of Io's volcanoes erupts, the surviving colonists must flee the moon and try to reach the safety of Earth. Using a derelict space station in orbit of Io, they convert it into a rudimentary space craft and set off, having many adventures and forming close relationships along the way.

The series was followed by Return to Jupiter.

== Introduction ==
The main character is Michael Faraday, a boy in his teens who has lived in space his whole life. Having never been to Earth, he resides with his father on the moon Io. Despite being a mining colony habituated predominantly by adults, a few have their families with them. Michael's best friend is Kingston, the son of the medical officer of the colony. In addition to this duo are Jarrod and Anna, both children of a fellow miner Carl. Jarrod and Michael always compete with each other, Jarrod being the brawn and Michael being the brains. Michael's father is the local space tug pilot who ferries passengers and equipment to and from the moon to the orbiting space craft.

The series is set in the not too distant future. The mine's administrator is a company man called Duffy who oversees and runs the colony. An older and often regarded as aloof expert, Professor Jacob Ingasole, has been studying the mining operations and the effects of the mining on the planet and to the colony. Although his predictions have been regarded as "hairbrained" (his previous prediction was that a comet would come and destroy the colony) his latest work regarding the mines and the lava flow have credit. Despite the imminent danger, the deep drilling mining operations continue.

A group of scientists from the company joins the colony, including Kumiko and her parents, who specialise in seismology. Kumiko has rarely been away from Earth, and her arrival on Io places her in an unfamiliar environment. She carries her computer with her throughout the journey.

== Plot ==
The motley crew is in the mines on Io. Although forbidden from being in the mines, the older teens manage to sneak their way in despite elaborate security systems. The introduction to the show is through the experience of the kids as they meet the newest additions to the colony, a team of seismologists sent to examine the continuance of the highly profitable mining of resources on Io. Upon arrival, in an attempt to show off, both Michael and Jarrod take Kumiko into the mines asking Kingston and Anna to "cover for them". Whilst in the mines, the automated mining operations system hits a lava pocket. The resulting explosion destroys the rig and causes widespread tunnel collapses. After finding their way into a disused miners shelter, the trio find themselves trapped. With access to the main shaft cut off with sulfur and lava being forced up the main shaft, they climb up a disused ventilation shaft. After being covered in debris in the Jupiter bar whilst playing a computer game, Kingston and Anna watch as the adults go over the maps to the tunnels and how to best get to the children. With the adults gone, Kingston works out that the trio would have gone away from the main shaft and through another subsidiary tunnel to get back. It isn't long before both groups meet up coming out of a ventilation shaft much to the relief of all parents.

After the incident, Duffy the administrator announces that all is safe and that mining operations will recommence soon. It is this that Professor Ingosol disagrees. He believes that they "must evacuate immediately!" to which Duffy replies, "where to?" "To KL-5". KL-5 was the original set up ship to get to Io. It was designed to provide the colonists with all the systems necessary to begin the colony. However, the ship was also designed to not be used for long-distance travel; most of the station has been gutted out to install the systems on Io. KL-5 is also a derelict station, not having been used for nearly 10 years. Michael talks his dad into taking up professor Ingosol to check out the station after hearing his and Duffy's exchange. Against his better judgment, they are soon jetting up to KL-5 on the tug with 2 stowaways, Michael and Kumiko. Due to the security system designed to monitor the colony and surrounding space, Duffy is alerted to an unauthorised tug takeoff. With this he tries to contact the tug. The explanation by the 'rogue pilot' is that he was giving the tug's engines a test fire. As they approach the station, the remote access system designed to reactivate the system does not respond. Professor Ingosol suggests that they go in through the garbage chute and reactivate the power. There's only one problem, it's too small for adults but just the right size for a pair of teenagers. Michael and Kumiko, who have now been discovered, become the reluctant explorers of the derelict station. There's also another catch: the power packs on the environmental suits are both very low; only 10 minutes of air is available. The location of the garbage chute is close to the stations hub so they should make it in time. Meanwhile, back on the colony, Carl and the other scientists run into the control station and explain to Duffy that the mining charges they were using to redirect the lava flow away from the main shaft have now fractured the substrata, and lava is now pouring into all of the tunnels. It is now just a race against time. Duffy recontacts the tug and orders them to reactivate the station. At this time, Michael and Kumiko have both made it into the station. However, the station was redesigned and no longer fits the layout as explained by Professor Ingosol. Just as they are about to turn back, Kumiko leads them following computer cables into the main hub. At this, the view screen back in the colony and in the tug of the operation is disrupted due to company security systems designed to secure the station. As they descend the stairs into the station, warning lights come on indicating that they only have 1 minute of air left. After getting to the main terminal and inserting the main boot disc, the system remains dead. After several tries, there is not much time left. Michael hits the computer and the station begins whirring to life. The station's magnificent solar sails open up to absorb the sunlight from the Sun and to also restart the power and life systems. Soon the station has breathable oxygen and both Michael and Kumiko declare that "KL-5 is ready for passengers".

After reactivating the once derelict space station KL-5, the next task is to evacuate everyone up to the station. With more damage being done to the colony, certain areas are off limits, one now being the residential quarters. Kingston and Anna only want their stuff so they go on an expedition to reclaim their material possessions. Unbeknownst to everyone else, the group of teens help in the packing up for evacuation. Kumiko, who was put in charge of Kingston and Anna realises they are missing and asks Michael and Jarrod for help. Jarrod is too busy so Michael escorts Kumiko. Meanwhile, Kingston and Anna are about to return with their possessions when they run into Mr Duffy. Despite his anger, his attention is diverted when another explosion rocks the colony. This now isolates Michael and Kumiko from the rest of the evacuees. With the majority of people now loaded onto KL-5, Michael and Kumiko move to the old abandoned landing platform originally used when the colony was being first set up. There, they find a pressure sensor which they activate hoping their signal will show the others where they are. Meanwhile, Michael's father is upset at the prospect of leaving his son on the colony and attempts to go through the now collapsed main hallway tunnel. Despite being pulled back from the debris he refuses to take off. Over in KL-5's control room, Professor Ingosol begins getting an errant signal and alerts the team on the ground. At Kingston's exclamation that it must be them, the group set off and recover the last two evacuees just before the entire colony explodes and is engulfed into Io's lava flows.

Now safely on the station, the survivors must now face a decision. Do they stay, or do they leave? With the last ore carrier having left only in the past week, it would be 6 months before the next ore carrier arrives. Some however, have reservations about sending a derelict space station halfway across the Solar System. After all the alternatives have been weighed up, it is determined that they will go. In order to break Jupiter's massive gravitational pull, they couple the space tug up to KL-5. As the systems begin to countdown for launch, an error appears in the space station control room. They are unable to fire the thrusters from there. Meanwhile, on the tug, Jarrod and his father and Michael's father are attempting to fix the problem. They test fire the tugs engines determining that the tug is fine but it must be the computer controls. With less than 1 minute to go, they still do not have a response in the control room. The three in the tug decide to fire it manually from the tug. As the time comes, the engines roar into life at full power. At 65% escape velocity, the engines of the tug can't take much more. The whole station begins shaking violently as they attempt to get out of the gas giant's gravitational pull. With the tug's engines at 115%, the station begins accelerating and soon hits escape velocity. Next stop Saturn.

Michael, Kingston and Jarrod are in the hydroponics bay. This device also produces the oxygen for the station. Whilst cultivating algae Kingston asks Michael why they're going to Saturn despite it being further away from Earth. Michael explains that it's necessary in order to conserve fuel. They will use Saturn to slingshot around and head straight to Earth. A solar sail failure threatens to derail the voyage but after much work, Carl is able to fix the hydraulics allowing the solar sail to retract and then slingshot around Saturn.

On the approach to the inner planets, the next big hurdle is now the asteroid belt.

When a fuel shortage develops, Duffy calls off Christmas. Professor Ingosol suggests that they siphon fuel from the ore carrier that launched ahead of them, but it doesn't appear to be in the location he calculated it would be. In secret, Kingston and Anna gather items for presents, while Kumiko uses her computer to program a holographic tree. Thanks to the kids, a necessary replacement component is found, the ship's sensors are repaired, KL-5's fuel is replenished, and everyone celebrates Christmas.

After an attack by a rogue defense satellite, KL-5 has been damaged beyond repair and is slowly drifting towards the sun. The only remaining option is to send someone to Earth for help; the space tug only has room for five passengers, so Michael, Jarrod, Kumiko, Kingston, and Anna are selected by Duffy (saving the youngest crew members in case all doesn't go according to plan). Michael pilots the tug to a space station over Earth, and the adults are successfully rescued from KL-5. The five young people enjoy some welcome downtime on the beach.

== Cast ==
- Abe Forsythe as Kingston
- Anna Choy as Kumiko
- Steve Bisley as Duffy
- Fiona Stewart as Celia
- Daniel Taylor as Michael
- Justin Rosniak as Gerard
- Robyn MacKenzie as Anna
- Arthur Dignam as Professor Ingosol
- Ivar Kants as Carl
- Russell Kiefel as Gilbert

== Novel ==
In 1995, a novel by David Ogilvy which is based on the TV series and shares its name was released. Escape from Jupiter (ISBN 0563404302) was 240 pages long and was published by Penguin Character Books Ltd and was licensed by the BBC; it is not currently in print.

== See also ==
- List of Australian television series
