= No Leave, No Life =

- Advert for No Leave, No Life
- Presented by: Ernie Dingo (2009–2010); James Tobin (2010–2011); Tim Ross (2011–2012)
- Country of origin: Australia
- No. of seasons: 3
- No. of episodes: 21

Production
- Running time: Approx 30 minutes (including commercials)

Original release
- Network: Seven Network
- Release: 5 December 2009 – 14 January 2012

No Leave, No Life is an Australian lifestyle television series, hosted by Ernie Dingo in season 1, James Tobin in season 2 and Tim Ross in its third season. The program features a celebrity guest presenter each week surprising ordinary Australians with a holiday, and the destination is then profiled. Another celebrity, often a comedian, then fills in for them at their work while they are away. The title of the show, "no leave, no life" was an Australian tourism campaign slogan.

The program premiered during the summer non-ratings period on Saturday 5 December 2009 at 6:30pm. The program returned for a second season on 4 December 2010 with James Tobin as the new host. In June 2011, Seven were casting for seven people to feature in a third season of the program. It was also announced Tim Ross would become the new host for the seven-episode run, which began on 3 December 2011 in its traditional Saturday 6:30pm timeslot.
