= Baddiel and Skinner Unplanned =

- Presented by: David Baddiel; Frank Skinner
- Country of origin: United Kingdom
- Original language: English
- No. of series: 5
- No. of episodes: 60

Production
- Running time: 30 minutes (including adverts)
- Production company: Avalon Television

Original release
- Network: ITV
- Release: 28 May 2000 – 14 September 2005

Related
- Fantasy Football League

Baddiel and Skinner Unplanned is a British free-form television talk show hosted by comedians David Baddiel and Frank Skinner and produced by Avalon Television for ITV. It ran from 28 May 2000 to 14 September 2005. Its concept was developed at the Edinburgh Festival Fringe prior to the television series. Alongside the television series, the show had a run in the West End at the Shaftesbury Theatre between 17 April and 12 May 2001 from which a ‘Baddiel and Skinner Unplanned - Live in the West End’ DVD was released.

== Format ==
The intro to the show begins with a slow pan along an empty street before focussing on actor Lewis Rose who sings the intro before the crowds come in to join with a chant of "It'll never work" and head into the theatre to watch the show. Baddiel and Skinner eventually join in with the crowds and enter themselves, singing "And neither will we again!"

The show features the two hosts sitting on a couch on-stage and responding to questions from the audience – at times rather seriously, but usually with bizarre digressions into satirical comedy. An audience member is chosen as "Secretary" and has the job of keeping a note of the topics covered on a white board. In practice, the personality of the secretary will also prompt many jokes – usually at his or her expense. At the end of the show, Skinner asks either the secretary or the audience to choose between two song books, and to pick a page number between 1 and 20. This process determines which song is performed by the duo, sung by Skinner with Baddiel accompanying him on piano (or, on at least one occasion, semi-acoustic guitar).

Topics of discussion are wholly mandated by the audience and have ranged from discussions of the war against Iraq and other political events to comments on the latest plot twists of popular soap operas and the Atkins diet. Skinner's Catholicism and Baddiel's Jewish culture are also occasional targets of humour (Baddiel describing Skinner's faith as being "insane" and Skinner often using a music-hall Jewish accent to hold mock dialogues among members of Baddiel's extended family, as well as both performers demonstrating how to "play the piano in a convincingly Jewish manner").

To avoid it becoming too similar to the pair's other show, Fantasy Football League, an unofficial rule was introduced to prevent discussion of football-related topics.

== Series overview ==
Series	Episodes	Originally released	
Series	Episodes	First released	Last released
1	12	28 May 2000	15 June 2000
2	12	14 January 2001	2 February 2001
3	12	14 March 2002	30 June 2002
4	12	29 January 2003	16 April 2003
5	12	28 June 2005	14 September 2005

== Episodes ==
Series	Episode	Original Aired Date	Secretary	Song	Discussion Points
1	1	2000-05-28	Karen - IT Consultant	King of the Road (Orange Book, Song 7),	Dave's 36th Birthday, IT = I Try, Soccer Six, Insatiable pigs, Robert De Niro, Mike Reid
1	2	2000-05-29	Paul - Penguin Keeper	Oh, Pretty Woman (Orange Book, Song 14)	Gladiators, Toilet signs, beards, African penguins, what the director does, using star status to get women
1	3	2000-05-30	Simon - Sales Rep	Je t'aime (Orange Book, Song 17)	Dave's cat, naked with a tortoise, "even this", "little tablet you stick up your...", "Fit old bird where frank bottled it", lack of female input in the show
1	4	2000-05-31	Ally - Frank's longtime friend/stalker (also a nanny)	Sugar, Sugar (Orange Book, Song 8)	Yorkshire viewers, Tennis with Les Dennis, Meeting Frank's stalker ally, Frank's stalker's book of Frank photos, Stalking, News at Ten, who misses it, Private v Public school, EastEnders spoiler
1	5	2000-06-05	Shelly - in the Deli	At the hop (Orange Book, Song 25)	Daniella Westbrooke's nose, Rainforest Cafe, Frank owns a bit of the rainforest, naked on stage
1	6	2000-06-06	Arron Shakespeare - Freelance Librarian	Prince Charming (Orange Book, Song 7)	Cocaine users, the Arron and Alan show, Camp School, London Beefeaters, Ronan Keating, Coronation Street spoiler,
1	7	2000-06-07	Laurie JPS - Art Student	Day Dream Believer (Orange Book, Song 2)	Boy or girl, British Library, piercings, Insomnia
1	8	2000-06-11	Will - Secretary for a website	Kung Fu Fighting (Orange Book, Song 14)	Baldness and Hair loss, Dave's dad, Coronation Street spoiler, bucket in the bedroom, adult swimming lessons, sued by a psychic, the Royals
1	9	2000-06-12	Shine - Student of Chemistry	Somethin' Stupid (Orange Book, Song 21)	Guessing celebs, Boris Yeltsin, Frank and Dave's old flat in Kilburn, Stoke Newington
1	10	2000-06-13	Bruce - Film maker	Three Coins in the Fountain (Orange Book, Song 9)	(Blind Date (British game show)) party, Roy from the gym, Bruce gets burnt twice, Who would play you in a film, Dave's gossip on Prince Edward affair, "Oh do you princess Margaret", Dave's bad taste missile joke, Should parents smack children, Lemsip for Bruce, Should same sex couples chose sex of unborn children
1	11	2000-06-14	Bill - Civil Servant at Ministry of Agriculture	December, 1963 (Orange Book, Song 11)	Gordon Moore's gum dying toothpaste, Keith Chegwin, Brighton nudist beach, tosser says tosser, Close encounters
1	12	2000-06-15	Jess - Student of film TV and drama	The Lion Sleeps Tonight (Orange Book, Song 16)	Massage, frank and Dave swap with audience, "So if I did this... Streaker"
2	1	2001-01-14	Jamie - Homebase Logistics	Baggy Trousers (Blue Book - Song 4)	Deaf people, Debra Bailey, bald Bruce Forsyth, "Don't be a winner - vote for skinner", giraffe sounds (part 1)
2	2	2001-01-15	Ruth - Drama Therapy Student	Memories Are Made of This (Orange Book, Song 7)	Judaism, Drama therapy, masturbation at work, Castaway film, Archipelago restaurant, acupressure,
2	3	2001-01-17	Travis - Performing Arts Student/Barman	Waterloo (Blue Book, Song 16)	Hat hair, Frank's girlfriend, Travis on the pull, Jewdo, Vengaboys,
2	4	2001-01-19	Kelly - Customer Services	Baby One More Time (Blue Book, Song 15)	Carol Vorderman, golf, suits, dogs, anxiety attacks, Rod Stewart
2	5	2001-01-21	Harriet M - Secretary	Lost in Music (Orange Book, Song 11)	Unfortunate background, Quantity surveyor, Who wants to be a millionaire, Blind date question, Daisy chain, Conga
2	6	2001-01-22	Chris Long - Photographic Portrait Assistant	I Only Want to Be with You (Blue Book - Song 5)	Dave's jacket, the aids, Skoda, Dave's arrest, giraffe sounds (part 2)
2	7	2001-01-24	Charles - Liberal Arts student	Crazy (Blue Book - Song 10)	Frank has a cold, Peter Mandelson's resignation, Dave's uses the f word on live TV, gay code, Dave's birthplace, Jimmy Savile, Chinese New Year, Frank's pants
2	8	2001-01-26	Bonnie - Secretary	A Night To Remember (Orange book, Song 12)	Church of England priest, Basil Brush, Prince Naseem Hamed, A1, Dave's dad, snooker with Steve Davis, Paul McKenna, "a gentleman never tells", most embarrassing moment on TV
2	9	2001-01-28	Bernie - Youth Worker	What a Wonderful World (Orange book song 5)	Frank's birthday, Grecian 2000, Gary Newman, Meeting women online, wigs, Frank and Dave's worst jobs, turkey eggs (part 1), call my muff
2	10	29/01/2001	Gemma - Student of Leisure Management and Sport	Killing Me Softly (Orange book song 4)	Love bite appreciation society, West End of London, tramps and rent boys, Stephen Hawking, Chad, Izal toilet paper (from school), penny chews, turkey eggs (part 2)
2	11	31/01/2001	Gareth - Advertising	The 'In' Crowd (Orange Book, Song 12)	Cat therapist, Noel Edmonds, Tax, "when ur hand is hard ur meat is done"
2	12	02/02/2001	Rachel- Advertising	Big Spender (Blue Book, Song 12)	Spontaneous applause, signing on, Newsnight, Rent, Cilla Black, "describe each other in 5 words", phobias
3	1	14/03/2002	Shema Stanley - Marketing	American Pie (Red Book, Song 8)	Unplanned goes international, Continuity problems, Hosting the Brit Awards, Kurt Cobain and Ken Dodd, One armed Zippy
3	2	21/03/2002	Rob - Student of special effects	Old Man River (Red Book, Song 7)	Romford births, Special effects, German Three Lions, Most famous person in phone book, Up the auntie, Likely lads, Alistair McGowan, Ex-partners, Bono vs George Bush
3	3	28/04/2002	Susannah - Sales Manager	Bachelor Boy (Yellow Book, Song 8)	Smell of burning, Dave's jacket, London marathon, the show is pre recorded, Beckham's hair, the futures bright "the Fuchsia's Orange", celebrity freebies, Friends Reunited (part 2), dog looks like frank, Jewish Dwarf, George Formby
3	4	04/04/2002	Angela Barrel	Shake Rattle and Roll (Yellow Book, Song 4)	Mobile Phones, George Formby, Dreadlocks, Friends Reunited (part 2), Liam Gallagher in a Jewish chip shop, Jordan giving birth, Through the Keyhole, Charles Dickens' business card, Janine Butcher
3	5	11/04/2002	Motti Coleman - Gap Year at a Finance Company	Crying (song) (Red Book, Song 2)	Paul Daniels, In court with Boris Becker, Kylie Minogue, severed head in a bag, writer of erotic tales, dogs see in black and white
3	6	18/04/2002	Sukanya - HR Consultant	Delilah (Yellow Book, Song 9)	Elvis ladies, Loud lady, Dave's trousers, Dress to left or right, Patrick auditions for Secretary but never tells the Frank story, EastEnders’ little Mo, liposuction, Frank's ring, Beckham's foot, Marilyn Monroe,
3	7	25/04/2002	Sharon - Teacher	Mambo No. 5 (Red Book, Song 5)	The Vagina Monologues, Billy Elliot, gayometer, gay animals, new theme tune
3	8	02/05/2002	Trevor - Retired Writer	Seasons in the Sun (Red Book, Song 13)	Shark attack, Rear of the Year, Jaffa Cakes, Chris Collins, lion ladies and bloke lions, film of Frank's life, drunk stories
3	9	09/05/2002	Morne Morais - unknown	Evergreen (Yellow Book, Song 13)	Hand buzzer Joy buzzer, side of the bed, dreams coming true, Stars in Their Eyes, Name That Tune
3	10	16/05/2002	Claire and Sarah - unknown	Can't Get You Out of My Head (Red book, Song 5)	Twins, eBay, Star Wars premiere, Frank and Dave recreate sitcoms, Atomic Kitten and a Lightsaber
3	11	23/05/2002	Andy and Becky - unknown	I’ve Got You Under My Skin I've Got You Under My Skin (Red Book, Song ?)	Unmitigated success, Angus Deayton/ Have I Got News for You, ITV Digital Monkey, "Vilhelm's your uncle", Kimonos for Goalposts documentary, Frank gets the penthouse windup, Insomnia, Swinging, Posh and Becks party, David Blaine, being a woman for a day, eating dogs,
3	12	30/05/2002	Andy - English student	Three Lions (ad lib - not from the book)	Big Brother, alcoholics v celebrities, Frank's Institute of Cancer Research billboard, Lennox Lewis vs. Mike Tyson, Three Lions
4	1	29/01/2003	Sonya - NHS Clinical Coding/Security	I Will Always Love You (Purple Book, Song 6)	"Happy Birthday to you", Olivia Newton-John fan club, Koala Bears, Charlotte church, Frank's new dog, London olympics, marathon walking, Frank's upside down mouth
4	2	05/02/2003	Charlie - Nurse	The Impossible Dream (Orange Book, Song 2)	Sound activated bedside lamp, Michael Jackson, the Matthew Kelly comment, tunes, coronation street, coudoroy, Vera lynne, gulf war, green 3
4	3	12/02/2003	Emma - Receptionist	Pearl's a Singer (Orange Book, Song 2)	Martin bash ire, Atkins diet, performance enhancing LG drugs, wedding photos, Mike skinner, Colin power, Orange 1
4	4	19/02/2003	Ashley - Student of media	I Say a Little Prayer (Green Book, Song 16)	the Fonz, Gary Coleman, Alex furguson, David Beckham is Frank Spencer, Jack the Ripper, Ashley's joke, congestion charge, celeb daq, piles, Ashley peacock from coronation street, 2001 census
4	5	26/02/2003	Daniel - graphic designer	Fever (Green Book, Song 10)	A crow is a black bird but not a blackbird, Matthew Kelly, ant and dec, paid to go to the football with Tony the Tiger, eastenders, coronation street
4	6	05/02/2003	Laura - Secretary	Paranoid (Purple Book, Song 19)	frog marching, children's books, Nancy Delano/barbar dean at the football story, afternoon detective shows, sushi girls in Japan
4	7	12/03/2003	Siobhan - Singer	Do You Really Want To Hurt Me (Green Book, Song 18)	STDs, Operatunity, Nessun Dorma, Johnny Vaughan, gulf war, coronation street, Richard hill man, celebrity driving school
4	8	19/03/2003	Ryan - Student	I Walk The Line (Green Book, Song 7)	American conscription, invention of glasses, Elton John's outfits, Barium enemas, cold feet, George formby
4	9	26/03/2003	Nicola - Fashion Designer	Feel (Orange Book, Song 2)	Language barriers, all bran, Sudan Hussain lookalikes, frugal Frank, torture, stairlifts, dwarfs, Dave's visit to Autswith, green 3
4	10	02/04/2003	Natalie - Personal Assistant	Yellow (Purple Book, Song 17)	Desert navigation, Why rubber ducks are yellow, Coldplay, Tan Lines, Army Regiments
4	11	09/04/2003	Pip - Erotic Novelist	Spirit in the Sky (Purple Book, Song 19)	West Ham v West Brom, Gulf war leafleting, London Marathon, getting hit in the boobs/balls
4	12	16/04/2003	Craig - DJ	Ziggy Stardust (Purple Book, Song 10)	Audience clothing, bowling alley DJ’ing, ginger twins back again, Tatoo (band), "touch", throstle tattoo, Frank spotted in gay bar/comedy club, Anne Robinson, Carry on Cat-Flap, Dave's cave
5	1	28/06/2005	Anthony - "young lad"	Beyond the Sea (Red Book, Song 3)	Walk in baths, hoodie ban, Paris Hilton sex tape, first aid course, tramp mask, childcare, Make poverty history, Room 101, Crazy Frog, Big Brother
5	2	05/07/2005	Lauren - Student	Magic Moments (Blue Book, Song 11)	Live 8, shotgun, ringtones, Anal Sex Aid, "I was asking the clever one", 2012 Olympic bid, serial killers
5	3	12/07/2005	Lynn and Sian - mother and daughter	Love and Marriage (Red Book, Song 7)	Frank will never say "anyway" again, lilt, olympics, vampires v werewolf’s, hecklers, rude children’s books and sinister nursery rhymes, Law, where do you go to get doves, smuggling sand and stones
5	4	19/07/2005	Pat - Student of Media Technology	Love Me For A Reason (Red Book, Song 8)	Dave can't get past security, holiday in London, Tom Cruise, Frank’s hair, Frank’s story of Dave’s wet patch
5	5	26/06/2005	Keith - Courier	The Tide Is High (Blue Book, Song 7)	JNF quiz, Sittingbourne, ducks
5	6	02/08/2005	Lauren - Supervisor at Cinema	Since You've Been Gone (Blue Book, Song 3)	Barry the gardener’s password, groupies, catchphrases, Celebrity Mingers
5	7	09/08/2005	Sarah Baddiel - David’s Mother	Two Become One (Blue Book, Song 10)	Norwich City fans, Dave’s family tree, Kinga from Big Brother, demographic of unplanned TV audience, how to sneeze, celebrity shark bait, knickers
5	8	16/08/2005	Kerry - IT company employee	Fat Bottom Girls (Red Book, Song 5)	Weighing yourself, who's interesting, Frank’s watch, James Bond, public proposals, Zamo
5	9	23/08/2005	Vinit - not a professional David Baddiel lookalike	Aint That A Kick In The Head (Red Book, Song 2)	O Levels, Phil Mitchell, grant Mitchell, Ross kemp, martin kemp, Gary kemp, chaz and Dave, claims that Frank and Dave refused autograph, Jewish ginger man
5	10	30/08/2005	Lisa - Secretary	Que Sera Sera (Blue Book, Song 2)	This is your life, patent, Chewbacca, Countdown, kiss and tell stories
5	11	06/09/2005	Terry - Recruitment Agent	How I Wrote The Elastic Man (Blue Book, Song 8)	skimpy dressing gown, real v fake breasts, return of the ginger twins, ginger people, camera man’s phone, dunking biscuits, baldness, sex with a radiator
5	12	14/09/2005	Kelly - Singer	Hocus Pocus (Blue Book, Song 2)	Which fish, funeral song, sloppy seconds

== Other versions ==
In 2004, a similar series, with Australian comedy duo Merrick & Rosso, aired in Australia - Merrick and Rosso Unplanned.

== Other 'unplanned' content ==
Baddiel & Skinner produced a series of podcasts covering the 2006 FIFA World Cup for Avalon Television and The Times.

A special edition for Comic Relief called Baddiel & Skinner unplanned & unpaid was done in front of a celebrity audience in 2001.
