= Streets of Your Town (TV series) =

2016 Australian television series

Streets of Your Town is an Australian two-part factual television documentary that looks at Australian suburbs. The series began on the ABC on 15 November 2016. Tim Ross is a comedian, broadcaster and architecture enthusiast who acts as a tour guide, exploring how and why Australian suburbs look the way they do. Interviewees include Peter McIntyre, Kevin McCloud and Alain de Botton. The series was repeated in May 2017.
