= Family Confidential =

Family Confidential is an Australian factual television show that looks at Australia's most famous and influential families as they share, often for the first time on television, the private truths behind the well-known public face. This observational documentary series began on the ABC in 2011.

== Episodes ==
=== Series 1 ===
- Episode 1 | The Lowys

Pillars of the business and Jewish community, Frank Lowy and his family reveal a deep and painful wound that has haunted them for nearly 70 years in the first of a series on Australia's richest and most powerful families.

- Episode 2 | The Janes

Bob Jane's name and face is one of Australia's most famous brands, but the cost of this fame and the lifestyle it brought, has been significant.

- Episode 3 | The Mundines

Australia's most high profile Aboriginal family, the Mundines, have the fight of their lives on their hands, stemming from land that was once a source of power and pride.

- Episode 4 | The Barnes

A modern-day love story about the woman who helped shape the family behind rock'n'roll legend Jimmy Barnes.

- Episode 5 | The Waterhouses

The racing industry would never have been the same without the Waterhouses whose survival against the odds, to their fourth generation of bookmaking has amazed their critics.

- Episode 6 | The Hemmes

The Hemmes family behind the hugely successful House of Merivale and Mr John fashion name show their real colours behind the glamorous and flashy facade and enormous wealth.

- Episode 7 | The Garretts

The meteoric rise and tragic fall of the Andrew Garrett wine-making family and the turns of fate that thwarted their dreams of a multimillion-dollar wine and tourist empire.

=== Series 2 ===
- Episode 1 | The Nolls

The private tale of three brothers saved by music, but separated by success.

- Episode 2 | The Courtenays

The extraordinary home truths behind Australia's most famous author, Bryce Courtenay.

- Episode 3 | The Dingos

The family strength behind one of Australia's most famous faces Ernie Dingo.

- Episode 4 | The Holmes à Courts

The untold story of Australia's first billionaire Robert Holmes à Court.

- Episode 5 | The Jacobsens

The Shakespearean drama behind Australia's most successful showbiz family.

- Episode 6 | The Casellas

The family saga behind Australia's most successful wine label.

=== Series 3 ===
- Episode 1 | The Furness-Jackmans
- Episode 2 | The Kerrs

Miranda Kerr has been named 'the sexiest woman alive'. But behind the glamour and celebrity lies a tale of a down-to-earth country family defying the stereotypes with a strong sense of family values.

- Episode 3 | The Robertson Lettes
- Episode 4 | The Williams
- Episode 5 | The Costellos
- Episode 6 | The Blackmans

== See also ==
- Dynasties
