= Merrick and Rosso Unplanned =

- Art from the opening sequence of the show.
- Genre: Talk show
- Directed by: Adrian Dellevergin; David Summons
- Starring: Merrick Watts; Tim Ross
- Country of origin: Australia
- Original language: English
- No. of seasons: 3
- No. of episodes: 38

Production
- Production company: Granada Media Australia

Original release
- Network: Nine Network
- Release: 3 September 2003 – 10 November 2004

Merrick and Rosso Unplanned is a free-form talk show hosted by Australian comedians Merrick Watts and Tim Ross, based on the UK talk show Baddiel and Skinner Unplanned. Produced by Granada Australia, the series debuted on the Nine Network on 3 September 2003. The show was the network television debut for the comedy duo.

A highlight of the series involved comedian Scott Thomson who was dragged on stage to perform a stand-up comedy routine which poked fun at Australian personalities, in particular Nikki Webster and Democrats politician Natasha Stott-Despoja. A telephone number appeared on screen at the end of the segment for viewers to call who had taken offence at Thomson's material.

== See also ==
- The Merrick & Rosso Show
- Merrick and Rosso
