= Anna Choy =

Australian actress and presenter

- Born: 11 October 1978 (age 48); Hong Kong

Anna Choy (born 11 October 1978 in Hong Kong) is an Australian actress and presenter. She attended Fort Street High School in Petersham, Sydney. She also attended Boronia Park Public School in Gladesville, New South Wales, Australia.

She started her career appearing in small roles on television (she played Rose in Cassidy, a two-part mini series for television and starred as Kumiko in Escape from Jupiter and Return to Jupiter), but soon landed a break in 2000 co-hosting morning children's show The Big Breakfast, which was later rescheduled and retitled The Big Arvo. She left the show in 2004 and became a reporter for Beyond Tomorrow in 2005. Choy presented the SBS documentary Change My Race in 2013. She was a weather reporter for Sky News Australia between 2016 and 2017.

Choy served as an Australia Day ambassador between 2001 and 2006.

== Filmography ==
- Escape from Jupiter (1994)
- Return to Jupiter (1997)
- Scorched: The Complete Story (2008)
- Little Black Dress (2009)
