= The B Team (TV series) =

Australian television series

- Genre: Comedy
- Starring: Merrick Watts; Tim Ross
- Country of origin: Australia

Original release
- Network: Network Ten
- Release: October 6, 2005

The B Team was an Australian comedy television show, which screened on Network Ten.

The show starred comedians Merrick and Rosso and featured skits, pranks and some audience participation. The show's first episode aired on Wednesday 6 October 2005, but was soon cancelled due to poor ratings. Characters included bogans Brett & Craig, Dimitri the dodgy mobile phone dealer, DJ Panfa and Rosso Crowe.

== Characters ==
- Brett and Craig are bogans that dress badly and speak in very strong Australian ocker accents, who were supposedly from Adelaide, South Australia. Pranks involved these two Aussies in short shorts out in Los Angeles and make the people on the street uncomfortable by saying things such as "I bet yous wanna get on this [boat] and have sex, don't you?"
- Dimitri, (Merrick) an electronics store salesman who offered poor quality goods. This part of the show was shot at Precision Installations in Blakehurst, New South Wales. Dimitri was of Mediterranean heritage and appears to be very temperamental. He regularly misinterprets what other characters say and takes offence presuming they insulted his sister. Immediately thereafter, his aggression turns physical and he generally kicks or punches the air. Finally, he tells himself to calm down ("what would Craig David do in this situation? .... walk away") and approached the "offending character" with a proposition.
- DJ Panfa (Merrick), a DJ who plays old 80s records and shouts profane things to women in the crowd.
- Tonia Beardface (Rosso), presenter of a lifestyle television show, a parody of Tonia Todman.
- Dr Tipple, a plastic surgeon who performs very strange surgery such as implanting lasers into someone's eyes when he asks for laser eye surgery.
- Bernie Millionaire, a corpse (alluding to 20th Century Fox's 1989 Weekend at Bernie's). Bernie is the prize husband in a Bachelorette-style reality show in which glamorous, conniving young women covet the corpse. The 'winner', the aptly named "Chastity", was played by Hannah Cowley.
- Rosso Crowe (Rosso) in which he dresses as actor Russell Crowe and wanders around Sydney and Los Angeles. Amazingly there were many members of the public that were fooled despite the only similarity between Rosso and Russell being facial hair and accent. Russell Crowe had supplied Merrick and Rosso with some of his own clothing to help them pull off the stunt. Merrick and Rosso quoted Russell Crowe by stating that he found them to be "funny bastards" in a letter he wrote to them accompanying the aforementioned supplied items. Clothing includes a navy blue vest, a blue Cinderella Man Cap and a green and red South Sydney Rabbitohs Rugby League team jersey with a Cinderella Man logo.

== See also ==
- Merrick and Rosso Unplanned
- The Merrick & Rosso Show
