= Somewhere in the Darkness =

1992 book by Walter Dean Myers

- Author: Walter Dean Myers
- Language: English
- Genre: Children's fiction
- Publisher: Scholastic
- Publication date: 1992
- Publication place: United States
- Media type: Print, e-book, audiobook
- Awards: Newbery Honor Award; Coretta Scott King honor award Boston Globe/Horn Book Award Honor Book

Somewhere in the Darkness is a 1992 young adult realistic fiction novel written by Walter Dean Myers. It was published by Scholastic inc. The novel was a Newbery Honor Award and a Coretta Scott King honor award.

== Synopsis ==
Jimmy Little is a fourteen-year-old boy who lives in a New York City apartment with his legal guardian that he calls "Mama Jean". His mother died and his father was imprisoned for murder and robbery.

One day as Jimmy comes home from school, he finds that Mama Jean is not home. Instead, there is a man named Crab, who tells Jimmy that he is his father.

When Mama Jean comes home, Crab explains that the prison let him out. Mama Jean was happy to see him. But when he explains that he wanted to take Jimmy with him across the country, Mama Jean is worried about what could happen on that trip. But she does not want to let Crab down. So she agrees to let him go on the trip.

She gives Jimmy money for transportation and tells him to call her whenever he wants.

Jimmy and Crab drive from state to state. During the trip, Jimmy finds out that Crab escaped from prison. He wants to be let out of the car immediately, but after a little while of talking and reasoning, Jimmy decides to stay with Crab.

Crab takes Jimmy to Arkansas to meet his friends before he was wrongly put in jail. Some were nice people that he had no problems with. Others were stuck up jerks that Jimmy could not stand.

In the end of the novel, Crab dies of kidney failure. Jimmy feels sad and can not get Crab out of his mind. Jimmy uses the money given to him by Mama Jean and heads back to New York.

== Development ==
Per the New York Times, Somewhere in the Darkness is a "semiautobiographical work about the time when Mr. Myers, as a teenager, met his father for the first time".

== Release ==
Somewhere in the Darkness was first published in 1992 through Scholastic. An audiobook adaptation was released in 1999, also via Scholastic. The novel has gone through several subsequent reprints, including an e-book release.

== Reception ==
Critical reception has been positive and Ellen Creager of the Detroit Free Press noted that Something in the Darkness would be good for classroom readings. The Wasau Daily Herald praised the book, calling it a "riveting read". Pat Scales of Booklist gave it a starred review in 1993 and the publication later re-ran the review in 2016 as part of an anniversary of their Book Links service.

After the book's publication Myers stated that he received "very touching letters from people who were separated from their fathers."

=== Awards ===
Somewhere in the Darkness has won the following awards:

- Newbery Honor Award (1993)
- Coretta Scott King Honor Award (1993, won)
- Boston Globe/Horn Book Award Honor Book (1992, won)
