= The Big Arvo =

- Also known as: The Big Breakfast
- Genre: Children's television
- Developed by: Julie Hanna; Lisa Fitzpatrick
- Written by: Julie Hanna
- Directed by: Brian Forshaw
- Starring: Ben Hewett; Jennifer Hardy; Anna Choy; Curtis Fernandez; Luke Jacobz; James Tobin
- Country of origin: Australia
- Original language: English
- No. of seasons: 7

Production
- Executive producer: Julie Hanna
- Production locations: Sydney, New South Wales, Australia
- Running time: 22 minutes

Original release
- Network: Seven Network
- Release: 2 June 1999 – 14 July 2000
- Release: 1 February 2001 – 6 May 2005

The Big Arvo, originally titled The Big Breakfast, is an Australian television program that was broadcast on the Seven Network from 1999 until 2005.

== History ==
The program began in a morning time slot under the title The Big Breakfast, before moving to the afternoon as The Big Arvo, to make way for AMV: All Music Video and Sunrise. The program was presented by four hosts, who hosted the show in a large model bus. The program included segments such as "cool job" and "dare" to amuse younger viewers and to teach viewers who had outgrown Play School. It appeared in K-Zone magazine to celebrate 500 episodes.

== Hosts ==
Original Replacement

Role	Name	First Show	Last Show
1st co-host	Ben Hewett	2 August 1999	6 May 2005
2nd co-host	Jennifer Hardy	2 August 1999	6 May 2005
3rd co-host	Anna Choy	2 August 1999	May 2004
3rd co-host	James Tobin	October 2004	6 May 2005
4th co-host	Curtis Fernandez	2 August 1999	July 2000
4th co-host	Luke Jacobz	1 February 2001	March 2005

Notes

- There is a 7-month gap between Curtis Fernandez being replaced by Luke Jacobz as The Big Breakfast went off air during this time before being resurrected as The Big Arvo
- There is a 5-month gap between Anna Choy being replaced by James Tobin as The Big Arvo was off air during this time, replaced by Girl TV
- James Tobin was credited as "Jesse Tobin" for all episodes
- Ben and Jenny were the only two hosts to remain with the show for its entire run

== Programmes ==
=== Cartoons ===
Here is a list of cartoons that were shown as part of The Big Breakfast:

- Mummies Alive!
- Pancho and Rancho
- Johnny Bravo
- Tom and Jerry
- The Flintstones
- Sherlock Holmes in the 22nd Century
- Sonic Underground
- ReBoot
- Ed, Edd n Eddy
- The Bots Master
- Dexter's Laboratory
- The Legend of Prince Valiant
- Life with Louie
- The Powerpuff Girls
- I am Weasel
- Gargoyles
- Gargoyles: The Goliath Chronicles
- Sailor Moon (original DIC Dub)
- Cow and Chicken
- The New Adventures of Flash Gordon
- The Mask
- The Jetsons
- Basket Fever
- All Dogs Go to Heaven: The Series
- Star Trek: The Animated Series
- Richie Rich
- The Pirates of Dark Water
- Teenage Mutant Ninja Turtles
- Beast Wars: Transformers
- BattleTech: The Animated Series

=== Live-action ===
The Big Breakfast has also aired a few live action programmes:

- S Club 7 in Miami

== See also ==
- List of Australian television series
