= The Week the Women Went =

- Country of origin: Canada
- No. of seasons: 2
- No. of episodes: 16

Production
- Executive producers: David Paperny; Cal Shumiatcher
- Running time: 45 mins. approx.

Original release
- Network: CBC
- Release: January 21, 2008 – February 2009

The Week The Women Went is a television show produced by Paperny Films, and based on a BBC Three program of the same title. The show was part documentary, part reality television, that explores what happens when all the women in an ordinary Canadian town disappear for a week and leave the men and children to cope on their own.

The first season of the show was taped in Hardisty, Alberta from June 2 to June 9, 2007 and consisted of eight one-hour episodes. The show first aired on CBC Television in Canada on January 21, 2008 and concluded on March 10, 2008. An estimated 1.2 million viewers watched the debut episode.

The second (and last) season of the show was shot in Tatamagouche, Nova Scotia from September 8 to September 15, 2008 and began airing on January 21, 2009.
