= From Us to Youse =

Compilation album by Merrick and Rosso
- Released: November 2002
- Genre: Comedy
- Label: Sony

Merrick and Rosso chronology
Choice Cuts (2000)	From Us to Youse (2002)	Live And Totally Wrong (2007)

From Us to Youse is the second album of material taken from Australian comedians, Merrick and Rosso. The album was released in November 2002 and peaked at number 52 on the ARIA Charts.

At the ARIA Music Awards of 2003 the album won the ARIA Award for Best Comedy Release.

== Track listing ==
1. "Community Service Announcement" - 0:55
2. "Drug Dealers" - 1:24
3. "Lady Fluff" - 0:39
4. "Praying Mantis" - 0:23
5. "North Pole" - 0:36
6. "Ocean World 1" - 0:50
7. "Pashing" - 2:57
8. "IQ Test" - 1:08
9. "Phone Privacy" - 0:45
10. "Ancient Dinga's" - 1:30
11. "Choice Bro 1" - 2:34
12. "Moderately Passionate" - 0:20
13. "Crazy Barry's" - 0:33
14. "How You Going?" - 0:42
15. "Forgotten Gay Legends" - 0:48
16. "History of the Franger" - 1:39
17. "Man Child 1" - 1:45
18. "Postal Worker" - 1:23
19. "Rock with Jesus" - 0:48
20. "Ocean World 2" - 0:44
21. "Lleyton's Cup" - 1:04
22. "Hemorrhoid Cream" (Ibiza Remix) - 1:02
23. "Menopause" - 0:38
24. "Choice Bro 2" - 2:39
25. "Woomera" - 0:04
26. "Hello Australia" - 1:09
27. "Top Gun Sneeze" - 1:28
28. "Mobile Comebacks" - 0:52
29. "Randy Mountain Bike" - 0:52
30. "It's All Good" - 0:34
31. "Giant Squid" - 1:38
32. "Eating Soccer Players" - 0:42
33. "Stolen Bike in Studio" - 0:34
34. "Footy Bogans" - 0:45
35. "Flower Show" - 0:46
36. "Choice Bro 3" - 3:05
37. "CYI Card" - 1:31
38. "Simon Sensational" - 0:46
39. "Leanne's Boobs" - 0:39
40. "Mum's Toys" - 0:44
41. "Tightarse Tuesday" - 1:12
42. "Half a Woody" - 0:34
43. "Chucking Rocks" - 0:48
44. "Man Child 2" - 1:54
45. "Dildo Ear Rings" - 0:38
46. "Tight Arse Tuesday 2" - 0:51
47. "Stolen Bike" (remix) - 0:23
48. "Helium" - 0:28
49. "Kiddy Safe Muzzle" - 1:07
50. "Stalking Pork" - 2:01
51. "Star Turns, Bloopers & Rosso's Broken Arse" - 5:00

== Charts ==
Chart performance for From Us to Youse
Chart (2002)	Peak position
Australian Albums (ARIA)	52
