= James Tobin (presenter) =

Australian television presenter

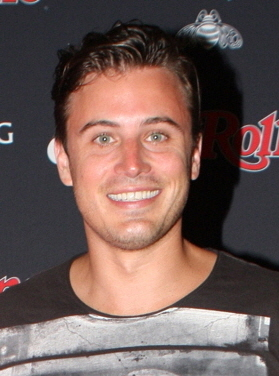
- Born: 1979 or 1980 (age 46–47); Sydney, Australia
- Other name: Jesse JT
- Occupation: Television presenter
- Years active: 2004–present
- Employer: Seven Network
- Known for: Weekend Sunrise; Better Homes and Gardens
- Spouse: Farrah (m. 2024)
- Partner: Jessica Sutta (2012–2014)
- Children: 1

James Tobin (born 1979 or 1980) is an Australian television presenter.

Tobin is currently the weather presenter on Weekend Sunrise and a reporter on Sunrise.

== Career ==
Tobin worked on Nickelodeon Australia's Saturday Nick Television (SNTV), a children's Saturday morning show which led to hosting and participating in many other Nickelodeon programs and special events. Tobin also worked in music and radio at 2Day FM, Mix 106.5, 2WS, Captain Cooke Productions and MTV.

In 2004, Tobin joined the Seven Network, and began hosting the children's game show Go Go Stop until 2008, which had school students competing across a floor of plasma screens and answering multiple choice questions.

In 2005, he co-hosted Seven's The Big Arvo, where he worked on location and on set covering every activity from cartooning to bull riding. He spent a week in a remote Australian place living and learning from an Aboriginal community. The show was axed at the end of 2005. Also in 2005, Tobin began hosting music TV show, Allphone's Eclipse Music TV on Saturday afternoons at 12 midday on the Seven Network.

In 2008, Tobin was appointed as the Entertainment Reporter for Sunrise, reporting on the latest music and movie reviews. He replaced Molly Meldrum and Jono Coleman. In 2009, he was a contestant on the 8th season of Dancing with the Stars. He also appeared in an episode of All Saints as a coma victim.

In October 2009, Tobin was announced as weather presenter of Weekend Sunrise while also regularly filling in for weekday Sunrise weather presenters Grant Denyer, Edwina Bartholomew and Sam Mac. During May to June 2011, Tobin presented weather across both Sunrise and Weekend Sunrise for 30 consecutive days whilst Denyer was on paternity leave.

In April 2010, Tobin was the runner-up to Firass Dirani in the Cleo Bachelor of the Year. He is also an ambassador for Father Chris Riley's "Youth Off The Street's Get Reel" program. James has also hosted the second series of the Australian lifestyle television show No Leave, No Life.

In April 2013, it was announced that James will be the new host of Beauty and the Geek Australia.

In January 2020, Tobin joined Better Homes and Gardens as a presenter covering Motoring and Technology.

== Personal life ==
Tobin dated singer Jessica Sutta from 2012 to 2014.

In October 2023, Tobin announced his engagement to partner, Farrah. They married in October 2024. In July 2025, Tobin announced that he and his partner Farrah were expecting their first child. Their daughter was born in November.
