= Australian Ninja Warrior season 4 =

Australian Ninja Warrior
- Season 4
- Presented by: Rebecca Maddern; Ben Fordham; Freddie Flintoff; Shane Crawford
- No. of episodes: 8

Release
- Original network: Nine Network
- Original release: 26 July – 10 August 2020

Season chronology
- ← Previous; Season 3 Next → Season 5

The fourth season of the sports entertainment reality competition series Australian Ninja Warrior premiered on 26 July 2020 on the Nine Network. The season is hosted by Rebecca Maddern, Ben Fordham, Freddie Flintoff and Shane Crawford.

== Production ==
On 17 October 2019, the series was officially renewed for a fourth season at Nine's upfronts, also confirming Fordham, Maddern and Flintoff were returning. The series was again relocated, with filming taking place at Melbourne Showgrounds in Ascot Vale. Due to the COVID-19 pandemic, production introduced audience lock-out, meaning members of the public could not attend as audience; only family members of contestants were allowed to attend. Co-host Rebecca Maddern, was temporarily placed in self-isolation and replaced by Shane Crawford for two heats, before being cleared and returning to filming. Crawford returned to the season as the sideline commentator for the semis and Grand Final after Freddie Flintoff had to fly back to the UK before coronavirus pandemic measures came into effect.

== Format Changes ==
- Power Tower - The Power Tower will see the two furthest fastest Ninjas from each heat and semi-final run go head-to-head side by side on an all new obstacle, climbing five 1.5m high steps, before a 2.35m leap to the first bar, travel 4.5m to the vertical pole, which they will slide down to an unsteady horizontal beam, move across a 3m beam to the next pole and climb 5.5m, then lache 1.75m to the horizontal ladder before leaping onto the platform and race to hit the buzzer.
  - Advantages
    - Heats - The winner will receive a 10-second time advantage into the semi-finals, meaning 10 seconds will be taken off their final time.
    - Semi-finals - The winner will receive a second chance advantage into the Grand Final, meaning if they make a mistake during their run, they can re-run the course again.

== Rounds ==
Underline represents the contestant who won the Speed Pass in the qualifying heats as a result of winning the head to head competition on the Power Tower.

Green represents the contestant who won the Safety Pass in the semi-finals as a result of winning the head to head competition on the Power Tower.

Italics denotes female competitors.

=== Episode 1 ===
==== Heat 1 ====
This episode aired on 26 July 2020. Only 6 competitors completed this course, with a large number of athletes bowing out on the Doorknob Drop. Returning athlete Ashlin Herbert received a 10-second advantage for the semi-finals, after beating Daniel Mason on the Power Tower.

- Quintuple Steps
- Tic Toc to Net
- Bridge of Blades
- Doorknob Drop
- Double Squirrel
- Warped Wall

Top 16 Competitors
Rank	Competitor	State	Time	Furthest Obstacle
1	Ashlin Herbert	VIC	1:26	Completed
2	Daniel Mason	VIC	1:42	Completed
3	Zak Stolz	VIC	1:58	Completed
4	Jake Baker	VIC	2:25	Completed
5	Stewart Furze	SA	2:38	Completed
6	Steve Taylor Madin	VIC	4:06	Completed
7	Michael Mischefski	VIC	1:20	Failed on Double Squirrel
8	Rhys Landwehr	WA	1:48	Failed on Double Squirrel
9	Troy Cullen	VIC	1:05	Failed on Doorknob Drop
10	Chris Poppleton	VIC	1:06	Failed on Doorknob Drop
11	Ryan Solomon	QLD	1:16	Failed on Doorknob Drop
12	Matthew Matazita	VIC	1:17	Failed on Doorknob Drop
13	Josh O’Sullivan	NSW	1:10	Failed on Doorknob Drop
14	Dan Bird-Smith	QLD	1:24	Failed on Doorknob Drop
15	Cian Maciejewski	NSW	2:02	Failed on Doorknob Drop
16	Skye Haddy	QLD	2:04	Failed on Doorknob Drop

=== Episode 2 ===
==== Heat 2 ====
This episode aired on 27 July 2020. Only 2 competitors completed this course, with a large number of athletes bowing out on the Doorknob Drop. Returning athlete Ben Polson received a 10-second advantage for the semi-finals, after beating Olivia Vivian on the Power Tower.

- Quintuple Steps
- Tic Toc to Net
- Bridge of Blades
- Doorknob Drop
- Flying Shelf Grab
- Warped Wall

Top 16 Competitors
Rank	Competitor	State	Time	Furthest Obstacle
1	Ben Polson	WA	2:16	Completed
2	Olivia Vivian	WA	5:53	Completed
3	Eddie Burrill	QLD	3:16	Failed on Flying Shelf Grab
4	Jack Martin	QLD	1:06	Failed on Doorknob Drop
5	Danielle Smith	WA	1:07	Failed on Doorknob Drop
6	Todd Smith	QLD	1:12	Failed on Doorknob Drop
7	Tom Nicholson	VIC	1:13	Failed on Doorknob Drop
8	Brendan Nachtigal	VIC	1:14	Failed on Doorknob Drop
9	Justin Flegler	QLD	1:15	Failed on Doorknob Drop
10	Nathan Burley	QLD	1:21	Failed on Doorknob Drop
11	Jade Genet	QLD	1:22	Failed on Doorknob Drop
12	Monika Siemonek	QLD	1:34	Failed on Doorknob Drop
13	Mel Armstrong	VIC	1:35	Failed on Doorknob Drop
14	Eloni Vunakece	NSW	1:36	Failed on Doorknob Drop
15	Sarah Blackmore	VIC	2:03	Failed on Doorknob Drop
16	Raphaela Wiget	SA	2:13	Failed on Doorknob Drop

=== Episode 3 ===
==== Heat 3 ====
This episode aired on 28 July 2020. Only 3 competitors completed this course, with a large number of athletes bowing out on the Bar Hop. Returning athlete Sam Goodall received a 10-second advantage for the semi-finals, after beating Matt Filippi on the Power Tower.

- Quintuple Steps
- Butterfly Wall to Zipline
- Bridge of Blades
- Bar Hop
- Flying Shelf Grab
- Warped Wall

Top 16 Competitors
Rank	Competitor	State	Time	Furthest Obstacle
1	Matt Filippi	QLD	1:17	Completed
2	Sam Goodall	WA	1:38	Completed
3	Zed Colback	WA	2:34	Completed
4	Alex Matthews	WA	2:34	Failed on Flying Shelf Grab
5	James Sayers	VIC	1:44	Failed on Flying Shelf Grab
6	Matt Laycock	QLD	1:57	Failed on Flying Shelf Grab
7	Nic Manning	NSW	3:15	Failed on Flying Shelf Grab
8	Harry Cole	VIC	0:46	Failed on Bar Hop
9	Rhys Menzel	SA	0:54	Failed on Bar Hop
10	Danial Wyles-Wall	QLD	0:55	Failed on Bar Hop
11	Luke Filippi	QLD	0:56	Failed on Bar Hop
12	Alex Bigg	SA	1:10	Failed on Bar Hop
13	Jarryd Sutton	SA	1:11	Failed on Bar Hop
14	Luke London	VIC	1:12	Failed on Bar Hop
15	Daniel Tolli	VIC	1:30	Failed on Bar Hop
16	Will Kelly	SA	1:55	Failed on Bar Hop

=== Episode 4 ===
==== Heat 4 ====
This episode aired on 2 August 2020. 10 competitors completed this course, with a large number of athletes bowing out on the Basket Toss. Returning athlete Charlie Robbins received a 10-second advantage for the semi-finals, after beating Bryson Klein on the Power Tower.

- Quintuple Steps
- Butterfly Wall to Zipline
- Bridge of Blades
- Bar Hop
- Basket Toss
- Warped Wall

Top 16 Competitors
Rank	Competitor	State	Time	Furthest Obstacle
1	Charlie Robbins	VIC	0:47	Completed
2	Bryson Klein	NSW	0:48	Completed
3	Rainer Scheu	QLD	1:01	Completed
4	Rob Patterson	QLD	1:02	Completed
5	Mike Snow	VIC	1:27	Completed
6	Fred Dorrington	QLD	1:42	Completed
7	Michael Fisher	QLD	1:47	Completed
8	Jordan Papandrea	NSW	1:55	Completed
9	Zac Perillo	VIC	2:21	Completed
10	Clem Vertigan	VIC	2:36	Completed
11	Alexander Robinson	NSW	1:37	Failed on Basket Toss
12	Tony Torrisi	QLD	2:02	Failed on Basket Toss
13	Chris White	WA	2:03	Failed on Basket Toss
14	Donny Byrne	WA	2:04	Failed on Basket Toss
15	Paul Culloty	QLD	2:14	Failed on Basket Toss
16	Matthew Bowles	WA	0:21	Failed on Bar Hop

=== Episode 5 ===
==== Semi-final 1 ====
This episode aired on 3 August 2020. The top 12 competitors all completed the course. Returning athlete Zak Stolz received a second chance advantage for the Grand Final, after beating Jordan Papandrea on the Power Tower.

- Snake Run
- Rolling Log
- Diving Boards
- Ring Toss
- Slingshot
- Warped Wall
- Barrell Roll
- Spider Jump
- Invisible Ladder

Top 12 Competitors
Rank	Competitor	State	Time	Furthest Obstacle
1	Zak Stolz	VIC	3:03	Completed
2	Jordan Papandrea	NSW	3:43	Completed
3	Rob Patterson	QLD	4:07	Completed
4	Mike Snow	VIC	4:57	Completed
5	Troy Cullen	VIC	5:12	Completed
6	Zed Colback	WA	5:37	Completed
7	Todd Smith	QLD	5:38	Completed
8	Eddie Burrill	QLD	5:38	Completed
9	Stewart Furze	SA	5:48	Completed
10	Sam Goodall	WA	5:51	Completed
11	Alex Matthews	WA	6:00	Completed
12	Jack Martin	QLD	6:12	Completed

=== Episode 6 ===
==== Semi-final 2 ====
This episode aired on 4 August 2020. Five competitors completed this course, with a large number of athletes bowing out on the Slingshot. Returning athlete Charlie Robbins received a second chance advantage for the Grand Final, after beating Matthew Bowles on the Power Tower.

- Snake Run
- Rolling Log
- Diving Boards
- Ring Turn
- Slingshot
- Warped Wall
- Barrel Roll
- Spider Jump
- Invisible Ladder

Top 12 Competitors
Rank	Competitor	State	Time	Furthest Obstacle
1	Charlie Robbins	VIC	5:03	Completed
2	Matthew Bowles	WA	5:15	Completed
3	Bryson Klein	NSW	5:40	Completed
4	Fred Dorrington	QLD	6:49	Completed
5	Olivia Vivian	WA	10:17	Completed
6	Harry Cole	VIC	6:51	Failed on Spider Jump
7	Ben Polson	WA	2:01	Failed on Slingshot
8	Alex Bigg	SA	2:02	Failed on Slingshot
9	Jake Baker	VIC	2:09	Failed on Slingshot
10	Rainer Scheu	QLD	2:18	Failed on Slingshot
11	Ryan Solomon	QLD	2:19	Failed on Slingshot
12	Rhys Landwehr	WA	2:30	Failed on Slingshot

=== Episode 7 ===
==== Grand Final, Stage 1 ====
This episode aired on 9 August 2020.

Competitors had to complete Stage 1 within 3 minutes and 45 seconds to advance to Stage 2. Only 8 of the 24 semi-finalists managed to complete all the obstacles in time. Olivia Vivian became the first woman to advance to Stage 2 of the Grand Final in the history of the Australian competition.

- Snake Run
- Rolling Log
- Balance Bridge
- Ring Turn
- Flying Shelf Grab
- Warped Wall
- Ferris Wheel
- Spider Jump
- Chimney Sweep

Successful completion of Stage 1
Rank	Competitor	State	Time Remaining
1	Zak Stolz	VIC	0:37
2	Mike Snow	VIC	0:32
3	Jordan Papandrea	NSW	0:19
4	Charlie Robbins	VIC	0:13
5	Ben Polson	WA	0:07
6	Olivia Vivian	WA	0:06
7	Alex Matthews	WA	0:05
8	Matthew Bowles	WA	0:02

=== Episode 8 ===
==== Grand Final, Stage 2 ====
This episode aired on 10 August 2020. Contestants had 2 minutes and 15 seconds to finish the six obstacles that were Stage 2.

- Rope Jungle
- Spin Hopper
- Salmon Ladder
- Unstable Bridge
- Wing Nuts
- Cat Grab
- Wall Lift

Full results for Stage 2
Rank	Competitor	State	Furthest Obstacle	Time Remaining
1	Charlie Robbins	VIC	Completed	0:22
2	Zak Stolz	VIC	Completed	0:15
3	Ben Polson	WA	Completed	0:09
4	Matthew Bowles	WA	Completed	0:04
5	Alex Matthews	WA	Failed on Wing Nuts	
6	Olivia Vivian	WA	Failed on Salmon Ladder	
7	Jordan Papandrea	NSW	Failed on Spin Hopper	
8	Mike Snow	VIC	Disqualified on Spin Hopper	

==== Grand Final, Stage 3 ====
Unlike the first two stages, no time limit was imposed on the Ninjas to complete Stage 3. Completion of this stage resulted in progressing to Stage 4.

- Hang Climb
- Body Prop
- Crazy Cliffhanger
- Floating Doors
- Flying Bar

Unranked results for Stage 3
Competitor	State	Furthest Obstacle
Charlie Robbins	VIC	Completed
Zak Stolz	VIC	Completed
Ben Polson	WA	Completed
Matthew Bowles	WA	Failed on Flying Bar

==== Stage 4, Mount Midoriyama ====
Competitors have to climb up a single rope up 20 metres to the top of Mt. Midoriyama within 30 seconds. For the first time in 4 seasons, 3 people made the top of Mt. Midoriyama. They are allowed to hit the buzzer before fully completing the ascent to the top.

Full results for Stage 4
Rank	Competitor	State	Time to ascend	2020 Season Result
1	Ben Polson	WA	25:56	Winner & First Australian Ninja Warrior
2	Charlie Robbins	VIC	26:56	
3	Zak Stolz	VIC	29:80	

== Obstacles by episode ==
=== Heats ===
Time Limit 1:50

Heat 1	Heat 2	Heat 3	Heat 4
Quintuple Steps	Quintuple Steps	Quintuple Steps	Quintuple Steps
Tic Toc to Net	Tic Toc to Net	Butterfly Wall to Zipline	Butterfly Wall to Zipline
Bridge of Blades	Bridge of Blades	Bridge of Blades	Bridge of Blades
Doorknob Drop	Doorknob Drop	Bar Hop	Bar Hop
Double Squirrel	Flying Shelf Grab	Flying Shelf Grab	Basket Toss
Warped Wall	Warped Wall	Warped Wall	Warped Wall

=== Finals ===
Semi-final 1	Semi-final 2	Grand Final		
Semi-final 1	Semi-final 2	Stage 1	Stage 2	Stage 3
Snake Run	Snake Run	Snake Run	Rope Jungle	Hang Climb
Rolling Log	Rolling Log	Rolling Log	Spin Hopper	Body Prop
Diving Boards	Diving Boards	Diving Boards	Salmon Ladder	Crazy Cliffhanger
Ring Toss	Ring Turn	Ring Turn	Unstable Bridge	Floating Doors
Slingshot	Slingshot	Flying Shelf Grab	Wing Nuts	Flying Bar
Warped Wall	Warped Wall	Warped Wall	Cat Grab	
Barrel Roll	Barrel Roll	Ferris Wheel	Wall Lift	
Spider Jump	Spider Jump	Spider Jump		
Invisible Ladder	Invisible Ladder	Chimney Sweep		

== Viewership ==
No.	Title	Air date	Timeslot	Overnight ratings		Consolidated ratings		Total viewers	Ref(s)
No.	Title	Air date	Timeslot	Viewers	Rank	Viewers	Rank	Total viewers	Ref(s)
1	Heat 1	26 July 2020	Sunday 7:00pm	1,040,000	3	56,000	3	1,096,000	
2	Heat 2	27 July 2020	Monday 7:30pm	848,000	6	69,000	5	917,000	
3	Heat 3	28 July 2020	Tuesday 7:30pm	793,000	5	68,000	5	861,000	
4	Heat 4	2 August 2020	Sunday 7:00pm	898,000	3	52,000	3	950,000	
5	Semi-final 1	3 August 2020	Monday 7:30pm	879,000	5	65,000	5	944,000	
6	Semi-final 2	4 August 2020	Tuesday 7:30pm	837,000	6	91,000	5	928,000	
7	Grand Final Stage 1	9 August 2020	Sunday 7:00pm	1,098,000	3	47,000	2	1,145,000	
8	Grand Final Stage 2 Winner Announced	10 August 2020	Monday 7:30pm Monday 9:30pm	1,060,000 1,199,000	5 2	86,000 73,000	3 1	1,144,000 1,272,000	
