= Australian Ninja Warrior season 1 =

Australian Ninja Warrior
- Season 1
- Presented by: Rebecca Maddern; Ben Fordham; Freddie Flintoff
- No. of episodes: 9

Release
- Original network: Nine Network
- Original release: 9 July – 25 July 2017

Season chronology
- Next → Season 2

The first season of the sports entertainment reality competition series Australian Ninja Warrior premiered on 9 July 2017 on the Nine Network. The season was hosted by Rebecca Maddern, Ben Fordham & Freddie Flintoff.

50 ninjas ran in each of the five qualifying heats, with the top 18 from each heat moving on to the semi-finals. From the three semi finals, the top 7 competitors moved on to the Grand Final. 9 Competitors finished stage one of the Grand Final, but none completed stage two. Fred Dorrington sat on top of the leaderboard for going the furthest in stage two.

== Rounds ==
=== Episode 1 ===
==== Heat 1 ====
This episode aired on 9 July 2017 and concluded with 11 finishers. Parkour twin, Dylan Pawson earned the Berocca Performance of the Night, completing the course in 58 seconds.

- Quintuple Steps
- Silk Slider
- Bridge of Blades
- Tyre Swing to Cargo Net
- Double Tilt Ladder
- Warped Wall

Top 18 Competitors
Rank	Competitor	State	Time	Furthest Obstacle
1	Dylan Pawson	QLD	0:58	Finished
2	Brodie Pawson	QLD	1:06	Finished
3	Mike Snow	VIC	1:10	Finished
4	Ryan Roberts	NSW	1:21	Finished
5	Jack Wilson	QLD	1:40	Finished
6	Troy Brown	VIC	1:45	Finished
7	Shaun McCarthy	SA	2:00	Finished
8	Kevin Robertson	VIC	2:19	Finished
9	Adam Chatfield	WA	2:21	Finished
10	Nathan McCallum	NSW	2:21	Finished
11	Thomas Pichler	QLD	3:01	Finished
12	Cody Thomas	WA	2:10	Failed on Warped Wall
13	Farkas Pungur	QLD	2:57	Failed on Warped Wall
14	Jake Bennett	NSW	3:02	Failed on Warped Wall
15	Janet Smith	WA	2:11	Failed on Double Tilt Ladder
16	Celeste Dixon	SA	2:24	Failed on Double Tilt Ladder
17	Adam Brown	NSW	2:25	Failed on Double Tilt Ladder
18	Kadeem Aarons	VIC	2:52	Failed on Double Tilt Ladder

=== Episode 2 ===
==== Heat 2 ====
This episode aired on 10 July 2017. Fastest finisher, Ashlin Herbert earned the Berocca Performance of the Night.

- Qunituple Steps
- UFO Slider
- Bridge of Blades
- Spinning Wheel to Cargo Net
- Tilting Frames
- Warped Wall

Top 18 Competitors
Rank	Competitor	State	Time	Furthest Obstacle
1	Ashlin Herbert	VIC	1:01	Finished
2	William Laister	VIC	1:20	Finished
3	Jesse Farquhar	VIC	1:25	Finished
4	Ben Jones	QLD	1:33	Finished
5	Tom Hazell	NSW	1:39	Finished
6	Scott Evennett	NSW	1:45	Finished
7	Neal Holmes	VIC	1:46	Finished
8	Luke Williams	SA	1:49	Finished
9	Ryan Solomon	QLD	1:53	Finished
10	Nic Turriff	QLD	1:57	Finished
11	Jaymes Wright	NSW	2:05	Finished
12	Lachlan Fyfe	QLD	2:10	Finished
13	Gavin Allen	SA	2:11	Finished
14	Mick Krake	NSW	2:18	Finished
15	Paul Ranger	WA	2:26	Finished
16	Dane Bird-Smith	QLD	2:34	Finished
17	Travers Jamieson	QLD	2:55	Finished
18	Francis Cullimore	NSW	2:55	Finished

=== Episode 3 ===
==== Heat 3 ====
This episode aired on 11 July 2017. Two members of Justice Crew, Sampson Smith and John Pearce both participated, both bowing out on the Bridge of Blades. The Berocca Performance of the Night was tied between Coby Head and Ricko Tralongo. Only 8 competitors completed this course, with a large number of athletes bowing out on the BOM slider.

- Qunituple Steps
- Bom Slider
- Bridge of Blades
- Cargo with Lache
- Ball & Chain
- Warped Wall

Top 18 Competitors
Rank	Competitor	State	Time	Furthest Obstacle
1	Cobi Head	NT	1:12	Finished
2	Ricko Tralongo	VIC	1:12	Finished
3	Daniel Mason	VIC	1:56	Finished
4	David Georgiou	QLD	2:04	Finished
5	Josh O'Sullivan	NSW	2:30	Finished
6	Raoul Stone	SA	2:43	Finished
7	Luke Ha	SA	3:12	Finished
8	David Ravi	WA	3:19	Finished
9	Caine Tsang	VIC	1:30	Failed on Ball and Chain
10	Martin Sta Ana	QLD	1:39	Failed on Ball and Chain
11	Rory Rhodes	QLD	1:45	Failed on Ball and Chain
12	Ryan Badhm	SA	2:56	Failed on Ball and Chain
13	Georgia Bonora	QLD	3:22	Failed on Ball and Chain
14	Sam Goodall	WA	00:51	Failed on Cargo with Lache
15	Lee Campbell	ACT	00:56	Failed on Cargo with Lache
16	Sean Hosking	VIC	00:57	Failed on Cargo with Lache
17	Betsy Burnett	NSW	1:02	Failed on Cargo with Lache
18	Nicklas Pedersen	VIC	1:04	Failed on Cargo with Lache

=== Episode 4 ===
==== Heat 4 ====
This episode aired on 16 July 2017. NRL legend Beau Ryan competed against AFL's Adam Cooney in a battle of the codes, with Beau progressing further through the course. Deaf competitor, Paul Cashion's run caused significant public outrage due to the way it was televised. This episode ended with a tribute to Johann Ofner, who had died on the set of a music video earlier in the year. 10 competitors completed this course. The Berocca Performance of the Night went to Lee Cossey.

- Quintuple Steps
- Slide to Box Jellyfish
- Bridge of Blades
- Rings to Cargo Net
- Pipe Climber
- Warped Wall

Top 18 Competitors
Rank	Competitor	State	Time	Furthest Obstacle
1	Lee Cossey	NSW	2:32	Finished
2	Tom O'Halloran	NSW	2:38	Finished
3	Ben Cossey	NSW	3:03	Finished
4	Rob Sandover	WA	3:08	Finished
5	Travis Edwards	NSW	3:16	Finished
6	Warwick Draper	VIC	3:17	Finished
7	Alex Matthews	WA	3:21	Finished
8	William Baron-Croston	NT	3:24	Finished
9	Johann Ofner	QLD	3:27	Finished
10	Donny Byrne	WA	4:18	Finished
11	Andrea Hah	NSW	3:43	Failed on Warped Wall
12	Daniel McLean	NSW	4:08	Failed on Warped Wall
13	Musashi Wakaki	NSW	1:56	Failed on Pipe Climber
14	Bruce Nunez	NSW	2:02	Failed on Pipe Climber
15	Adam Waring	VIC	2:06	Failed on Pipe Climber
16	Emmett Swindells	QLD	2:45	Failed on Pipe Climber
17	Matt Ah Chow	VIC	3:04	Failed on Pipe Climber
18	Beau Ryan	NSW	3:31	Failed on Pipe Climber

=== Episode 5 ===
==== Heat 5 ====
This episode aired on 17 July 2017 and concluded with 12 finishers. Former Bachelor Tim Robards participated but bowed out on the Cones to Cargo Net. The Berocca Performance of the Night went to Ben Polson

- Quintuple Steps
- Pole Rider
- Bridge of Blades
- Cones to Cargo Net
- Swing Cycle
- Warped Wall

Top 18 Competitors
Rank	Competitor	State	Time	Furthest Obstacle
1	Ben Polson	WA	1:19	Finished
2	Daniel Weston	QLD	1:29	Finished
3	Zayne Wealthall	WA	1:34	Finished
4	Joel Pocklington	VIC	1:46	Finished
5	Jake Baker	VIC	2:01	Finished
6	Jayden Irving	VIC	2:02	Finished
7	Fred Dorrington	NSW	2:10	Finished
8	Rob Patterson	QLD	2:16	Finished
9	Shane Elisara	QLD	2:20	Finished
10	Matthew Timms	VIC	2:37	Finished
11	Takayuki Miyamoto	QLD	2:56	Finished
12	Aurelien Apport	NSW	3:23	Finished
13	Damian Istria	QLD	2:30	Failed on Warped Wall
14	Glen West	NSW	1:22	Failed on Swing Cycle
15	Ryan Brooke	QLD	1:26	Failed on Swing Cycle
16	Stephanie Magiros	NSW	3:00	Failed on Swing Cycle
17	Nathaniel Irving	VIC	0:54	Failed on Cones to Cargo Net
18	Michael Nass	QLD	0:58	Failed on Cones to Cargo Net

=== Episode 6 ===
==== Semi-final 1 ====
This episode aired on 18 July 2017. This episode had three new obstacles after the Warped Wall, the Ring Jump, Pole Grasper and Chimney Climb. This semi-final included Johann Ofner, who died on set of a music video earlier in the year, but the footage of the stunt man was edited out. Rob Patterson had the Berocca Performance of the Night. Damian Istria was unfortunately unable to complete the course as the jump hang net snapped.

- Quintuple Steps
- Log Grip
- Spinning Log
- Jump Hang
- Tyre Swing
- Warped Wall
- Ring Jump
- Pole Grasper
- Chimney Climb

Top 7 Competitors
Rank	Competitor	State	Time	Furthest Obstacle
1	Rob Patterson	QLD	3:56	Finished
2	William Laister	VIC	4:02	Finished
3	Mike Snow	VIC	4:43	Finished
4	Alex Matthews	WA	6:06	Finished
5	Nathan McCallum	NSW	3:38	Failed on the Pole Grasper
6	Johann Ofner	QLD	4:58	Failed on the Pole Grasper
7	Neal Holmes	VIC	3:53	Failed on Ring Jump

=== Episode 7 ===
==== Semi-final 2 ====
This episode aired on 23 July 2017. This episode had two new obstacles, Bungee Road & Flying Shelves. Andrea Hah had the Berocca Performance of the Night for being the first woman to make it up the Warped Wall.

- Quintuple Steps
- Log Grip
- Spinning Log
- Jump Hang
- Bungee Road
- Warped Wall
- Flying Shelves
- Pole Grasper
- Chimney Climb

Top 7 Competitors
Rank	Competitor	State	Time	Furthest Obstacle
1	Ashlin Herbert	VIC	3:13	Finished
2	Lee Cossey	NSW	3:19	Finished
3	Jayden Irving	VIC	3:29	Finished
4	Tom O'Halloran	NSW	3:34	Finished
5	William Baron-Croston	NT	4:06	Finished
6	Ben Cossey	NSW	4:09	Finished
7	Fred Dorrington	NSW	4:35	Finished

=== Episode 8 ===
==== Semi-final 3 ====
This episode aired on 24 July 2017. This episode had two new obstacles, Big Wheel & Swinging Spikes. Ben Polson had the Berocca Performance of the Night.

- Quintuple Steps
- Log Grip
- Spinning Log
- Jump Hang
- Big Wheel
- Warped Wall
- Swinging Spikes
- Pole Grasper
- Chimney Climb

Top 7 Competitors
Rank	Competitor	State	Time	Furthest Obstacle
1	Ben Polson	WA	4:40	Finished
2	Tom Hazel	NSW	4:41	Finished
3	Ryan Solomon	QLD	4:44	Finished
4	Luke Williams	SA	6:07	Finished
5	Sam Goodall	WA	7:51	Finished
6	Daniel Weston	QLD	2:45	Failed on Pole Grasper
7	Jack Wilson	QLD	4:02	Failed on Pole Grasper

=== Episode 9 ===
==== Grand Final ====
This episode aired on Tuesday 25 July 2017. Similar to many European versions of Ninja Warrior, the Grand Final was set over three stages. Fred Dorrington had Berocca performance of the night. Dorrington was nearly disqualified after his foot thought to touch the water, but after a replay shows that the safety mat caused the ripple, Dorrington was allowed to continue from where he left off.

Stage 1

The obstacles used on Stage 1 were:

- Quintuple Steps
- Big Dipper
- Spinning Log with Donut
- Jump Hang
- Spider Jump
- Warped Wall
- Globe Grasper
- Ring Swing
- Chimney Climb

All of these obstacles had to be completed within a 3:45 time limit.

Order	Finalist	Outcome	Result
1	Ashlin Herbert	Completed	02:24
2	Rob Patterson	Completed	02:34
3	Tom O'Halloran	Completed	02:46
4	Ben Polson	Completed	02:50
5	Johann Ofner	Completed	03:00
6	Lee Cossey	Completed	03:02
7	Jack Wilson	Completed	03:18
8	Fred Dorrington	Completed	03:22
9	Alex Matthews	Completed	03:37

Stage 2

The remaining ninjas had to face 8 obstacles in stage 2, they had to pass the first 5 in under 65 seconds and then complete the other 3.

The obstacles used on Stage 2 were:

- Rope Jungle
- Basket Toss
- Salmon Ladder
- Unstable Bridge
- Wall Lift
- Crazy Cliffhanger
- Floating Boards
- Flying Bars

Order	Finalist	Outcome
1	Fred Dorrington	Failed on Unstable Bridge
2	Tom O'Halloran	Failed on Unstable Bridge
3	Ashlin Herbert	Failed on Salmon Ladder
4	Jack Wilson	Failed on Basket Toss
5	Rob Patterson	Failed on Basket Toss
6	Johann Ofner	Failed on Rope Jungle
7	Lee Cossey	Failed on Rope Jungle
8	Alex Matthews	Failed on Rope Jungle
9	Ben Polson	Failed on Rope Jungle

Stage 3

Stage 3 was to take on Mount Midoriyama, but all of the ninjas failed to pass stage 2.

== Obstacles by episode ==
Heat 1	Heat 2	Heat 3	Heat 4	Heat 5	Semi-final 1	Semi-final 2	Semi-final 3	Grand Final		
Heat 1	Heat 2	Heat 3	Heat 4	Heat 5	Semi-final 1	Semi-final 2	Semi-final 3	Stage 1	Stage 2	Stage 3
Quintuple steps	Quintuple steps	Quintuple steps	Quintuple steps	Quintuple steps	Quintuple steps	Quintuple steps	Quintuple steps	Quintuple steps	Rope Jungle	Mount Midoriyama
Silk slider	UFO slider to rope	Bom slider	Slide to box jellyfish	Pole rider	Log grip	Log grip	Log grip	Big Dipper	Basket Toss	—
Bridge of blades	Bridge of blades	Bridge of blades	Bridge of blades	Bridge of blades	Spinning log	Spinning log	Spinning log	Spinning Log with Donut	Salmon Ladder	—
Tyre swing to cargo net	Spinning wheel to cargo net	Cargo with laché	Rings to cargo net	Cones to cargo net	Jump hang	Jump hang	Jump hang	Jump hang	Unstable Bridge	—
Double tilt ladder	Tilting frames	Ball and chain	Pipe climber	Swing cycle	Tyre swing	Bungee road	Big Wheel	Spider Jump	Wall Lift	—
Warped wall	Warped wall	Warped wall	Warped wall	Warped wall	Warped wall	Warped wall	Warped wall	Warped wall	Crazy Cliffhanger	—
—	—	—	—	—	Ring jump	Flying shelves	Swinging Spikes	Globe Grasper	Floating Boards	—
—	—	—	—	—	Pole grasper	Pole grasper	Pole grasper	Ring Swing	Flying Bars	—
—	—	—	—	—	Chimney climb	Chimney climb	Chimney climb	Chimney climb	—	—

== Viewership ==
No.	Title	Air date	Timeslot	Overnight ratings		Consolidated ratings		Total viewers	Ref(s)
No.	Title	Air date	Timeslot	Viewers	Rank	Viewers	Rank	Total viewers	Ref(s)
1	Heat 1	9 July 2017	Sunday 7:00pm	1,680,000	1	95,000	1	1,775,000	
2	Heat 2	10 July 2017	Monday 7:30pm	1,604,000	1	96,000	1	1,700,000	
3	Heat 3	11 July 2017	Tuesday 7:30pm	1,470,000	1	123,000	1	1,593,000	
4	Heat 4	16 July 2017	Sunday 7:00pm	1,758,000	1	46,000	1	1,804,000	
5	Heat 5	17 July 2017	Monday 7:30pm	1,527,000	1	87,000	1	1,614,000	
6	Semi-final 1	18 July 2017	Tuesday 7:30pm	1,570,000	1	97,000	1	1,667,000	
7	Semi-final 2	23 July 2017	Sunday 7:00pm	1,745,000	1	56,000	1	1,801,000	
8	Semi-final 3	24 July 2017	Monday 7:30pm	1,535,000	1	73,000	1	1,608,000	
9	Grand Final Final Stage	25 July 2017	Tuesday 7:30pm	2,038,000 2,145,000	2 1	120,000 82,000	2 1	2,158,000 2,227,000	
