= Australian Ninja Warrior season 5 =

Australian Ninja Warrior
- Season 5
- Presented by: Rebecca Maddern; Ben Fordham; Shane Crawford; Nick Kyrgios
- No. of episodes: 9

Release
- Original network: Nine Network
- Original release: 20 June – 6 July 2021

Season chronology
- ← Previous; Season 4 Next → Season 6

The fifth season of the sports entertainment reality competition series Australian Ninja Warrior premiered on 20 June 2021 on the Nine Network. The season is hosted by Rebecca Maddern, Ben Fordham, Shane Crawford and Nick Kyrgios.

== Production ==
The Nine Network announced a fifth season on 16 September 2020. Casting applications are open until 30 November 2020. The series was again relocated, filming took place in Homebush, Sydney. In June 2021, Nine announced Nick Kyrgios would be joining the series as a sideline commentator alongside Shane Crawford, Andrew Flintoff didn't return for this season due to travel challenges and a busy schedule. In October, it is announced that Ben Fordham won't return for season 6, opting to focus on his radio career.

== Format Changes ==
- Obstacle Choice - During the heats, each ninja warrior has the decision to choose between two obstacles courses, both leading to the warped wall, course A includes obstacles they have attempted before on previous seasons, whereas course B includes all new obstacles not attempted before.

== Rounds ==
Underline represents the contestant who won the Fast Pass to the Grand Final in the qualifying heats as a result of winning the head to head competition on the Power Tower.

Green represents the contestant who won the Safety Pass in the semi-finals as a result of winning the head to head competition on the Power Tower.

Italics denotes female competitors.

=== Episode 1 ===
==== Heat 1 ====
This episode aired on 20 June 2021. Only five competitors completed this course, with a large number of athletes bowing out on the Flying Shelf Grab. Returning athlete Bryson Klein was given a fast pass to the Grand Final, after beating last season's winner Ben Polson on the Power Tower.

- Shrinking Steps
- Big Dipper to Pole Rider
- Cyclone Spinner

Obstacle A:

- Flying Shelf Grab
- Floating Monkey
- Warped Wall

Obstacle B:

- Ring Chaser
- Clockwork
- Warped Wall

Top 19 Competitors
Rank	Competitor	State	Time	Furthest Obstacle
1	Bryson Klein	NSW	1:51	Completed
2	Ben Polson	WA	2:19	Completed
3	Todd Smith	QLD	2:24	Completed
4	Josh O’Sullivan	NSW	3:07	Completed
5	Stewart Furze	SA	3:08	Completed
6	Nathan Burley	QLD	2:49	Failed - B. on Clockwork
7	Sam Roberts	QLD	2:45	Failed - A. on Floating Monkey
8	Cruze Morley	NSW	3:38	Failed - A. on Floating Monkey
9	Trevor Salter	WA	3:38	Failed - A. on Floating Monkey
10	Katie Sparrow	NSW	1:59	Failed - A. on Flying Shelf Grab
11	Matthew Dwyer	NSW	1:59	Failed - A. on Flying Shelf Grab
12	Joel Hogan	WA	2:02	Failed - A. on Flying Shelf Grab
13	Olivia Vivian	WA	2:06	Failed - B. on Ring Chaser
14	Zane De Andrade	ACT	2:16	Failed - B. on Ring Chaser
15	Darcy Elliston	NSW	2:25	Failed - A. on Flying Shelf Grab
16	Clem Vertigan	VIC	2:43	Failed - B. on Ring Chaser
17	Andrew McDonald	TAS	3:02	Failed - A. on Flying Shelf Grab
18	Melvin Solo	VIC	0:45	Failed on Cyclone Spinner
19	Daniel Horvath	NSW	0:55	Failed on Cyclone Spinner

=== Episode 2 ===
==== Heat 2 ====
This episode aired on 21 June 2021. Only five competitors completed this course, with a large number of athletes bowing out on the Beehive. Returning athlete Ashlin Herbert was given a fast pass to the Grand Final, after beating returning athlete Le Hua on the Power Tower.

- Shrinking Steps
- Big Dipper to Rope
- Cyclone Spinner

Obstacle A:

- Peg Board
- Bar Hop
- Warped Wall

Obstacle B:

- Weight For It
- Beehive
- Warped Wall

Top 19 Competitors
Rank	Competitor	State	Time	Furthest Obstacle
1	Ashlin Herbert	VIC	1:52	Completed
2	Le Hua	QLD	2:16	Completed
3	Daniel Mason	VIC	2:26	Completed
4	Rob Patterson	QLD	2:37	Completed
5	Mike Snow	VIC	2:46	Completed
6	David Lack	QLD	1:46	Failed - A. on Bar Hop
7	Rainer Scheu	QLD	1:47	Failed - B. on Beehive
8	Troy Cullen	VIC	2:17	Failed - B. on Beehive
9	Jeremy Soffe	WA	2:31	Failed - B. on Beehive
10	Will Kelly	SA	2:34	Failed - B. on Beehive
11	Celeste Dixon	SA	4:09	Failed - A. on Bar Hop
12	Raphaela Wiget	SA	4:39	Failed - A. on Bar Hop
13	Andrew Luo	NSW	2:06	Failed - B. on Weight For It
14	Jason Mitchell	NSW	2:07	Failed - B. on Weight For It
15	Khaled Mahmoud	NSW	2:08	Failed - B. on Weight For It
16	Ryan Rannard	NSW	2:12	Failed - A. on Peg Board
17	Danielle Smith	WA	2:31	Failed - A. on Peg Board
18	Alicia Prosser	QLD	4:06	Failed - B. on Weight For It
19	Russell Morris	SA	0:40	Failed on Cyclone Spinner

=== Episode 3 ===
==== Heat 3 ====
This episode aired on 22 June 2021. Only four competitors completed this course, with a large number of athletes bowing out on the Cyclone Spinner. Returning athlete Charlie Robbins was given a fast pass to the Grand Final, after beating returning athlete Zak Stolz on the Power Tower.

- Shrinking Steps
- Big Dipper to Rope
- Cyclone Spinner

Obstacle A:

- Flying Shelf Grab
- Floating Monkey
- Warped Wall

Obstacle B:

- Ring Chaser
- Clockwork
- Warped Wall

Top 19 Competitors
Rank	Competitor	State	Time	Furthest Obstacle
1	Charlie Robbins	VIC	2:13	Completed
2	Zak Stolz	VIC	2:41	Completed
3	Mat Hutchins-Read	NSW	3:31	Completed
4	Judith Caroll	NSW	6:06	Completed
5	Travis Edwards	NSW	1:59	Failed - A. on Floating Monkey Bars
6	Simon Duff	NSW	1:59	Failed - A. on Flying Shelf Grab
7	Luke Filippi	QLD	2:41	Failed - B. on Ring Chaser
8	Matt Filippi	QLD	2:45	Failed - B. on Ring Chaser
9	Frank Crispo	VIC	2:46	Failed - B. on Ring Chaser
10	Jessica Russell	NSW	2:15	Failed - A. on Flying Shelf Grab
11	Nathan Ryles	SA	2:26	Failed - A. on Flying Shelf Grab
12	Thierry Duff	NSW	2:50	Failed - B. on Ring Chaser
13	Martin Jones	VIC	0:37	Failed on Cyclone Spinner
14	Ryan Solomon	QLD	0:47	Failed on Cyclone Spinner
15	Jeffrey Mercado	NSW	0:48	Failed on Cyclone Spinner
16	Justin Duff	NSW	0:56	Failed on Cyclone Spinner
17	Jordan Papandrea	NSW	0:59	Failed on Cyclone Spinner
18	Peter Day	NSW	0:17	Failed on Big Dipper to Rope
19	Jay Evans	NSW	0:19	Failed on Big Dipper to Rope

=== Episode 4 ===
==== Heat 4 ====
This episode will air on 28 June 2021. Only eight competitors completed this course, with a large number of athletes bowing out equally on the Bar Hop and Beehive. First time athlete Jimmy Burrows was given a fast pass to the Grand Final, after beating also first time athlete Dylan James on the Power Tower.

- Shrinking Steps
- Big Dipper to Pole Rider
- Cyclone Spinner

Obstacle A:

- Peg Board
- Bar Hop
- Warped Wall

Obstacle B:

- Weight For It
- Beehive
- Warped Wall

Top 19 Competitors
Rank	Competitor	State	Time	Furthest Obstacle
1	Dylan James	NSW	2:19	Completed
2	Jimmy Burrow	NSW	2:22	Completed
3	Sam Goodall	WA	2:28	Completed
4	Zed Colback	WA	2:35	Completed
5	Jake Baker	VIC	2:42	Completed
6	Paul Culloty	QLD	4:18	Completed
7	Cameron McLintock	NSW	4:38	Completed
8	Chris White	WA	4:55	Completed
9	Eddie Burrill	QLD	1:32	Failed - A. on Bar Hop
10	Alex Bigg	SA	2:03	Failed - B. on Beehive
11	Kayle Goldring	NSW	2:04	Failed - B. on Beehive
12	Tom Pellow	NSW	2:22	Failed - A. on Bar Hop
13	Eloni Vunakece	NSW	2:23	Failed - A. on Bar Hop
14	Matt Laycock	NSW	2:41	Failed - A. on Bar Hop
15	Zachary Orchard	VIC	2:42	Failed - B. on Beehive
16	Jack Wilson	QLD	3:25	Failed - B. on Beehive
17	Lisa Campbell	QLD	4:23	Failed - A. on Bar Hop
18	Justin Flegler	QLD	4:38	Failed - B. on Beehive
19	David Bowd	NSW	2:19	Failed - B. on Weight For It

=== Episode 5 ===
==== Semi-final 1 ====
This episode aired on 29 June 2021. Two competitors completed this course. Returning athlete Zak Stolz received a second chance advantage for the Grand Final, after beating Rob Patterson on the Power Tower.

- Log Runner
- Double Dipper
- Twin Trapeze
- Flying Shelf Grab to Corkscrew
- Dragon Back
- Warped Wall
- Wing Nuts
- Spider Jump
- Chimney Rope Climb

Top 8 Competitors
Rank	Competitor	State	Time	Furthest Obstacle
1	Zak Stolz	VIC	3:46	Completed
2	Rob Patterson	QLD	5:03	Completed
3	Mat Hutchins-Read	NSW	3:20	Failed on Wing Nuts
4	Dylan James	QLD	3:01	Failed on Dragon Back
5	Martin Jones	VIC	3:30	Failed on Dragon Back
6	David Bowd	NSW	4:31	Failed on Dragon Back
7	Sam Roberts	QLD	2:00	Failed on Flying Shelf Grab to Corkscrew
8	Nathan Ryles	SA	2:07	Failed on Flying Shelf Grab to Corkscrew

=== Episode 6 ===
==== Semi-final 2 ====
This episode aired on 30 June 2021. Three competitors completed this course. Returning athlete Jake Baker received a second chance advantage for the Grand Final, after beating Jack Wilson on the Power Tower.

- Log Runner
- Double Dipper
- Double Tilt Ladder
- Flying Shelf Grab to Corkscrew
- Dragon Back
- Warped Wall
- Basket Toss
- Spider Jump
- Chimney Rope Climb

Top 8 Competitors
Rank	Competitor	State	Time	Furthest Obstacle
1	Jake Baker	VIC	4:15	Completed
2	Jack Wilson	QLD	6:37	Completed
3	Olivia Vivian	WA	7:51	Completed
4	Travis Edwards	NSW	2:18	Failed on Dragon Back
5	Ben Polson	WA	2:31	Failed on Dragon Back
6	Kayle Goldring	NSW	2:45	Failed on Dragon Back
7	David Lack	QLD	3:02	Failed on Dragon Back
8	Will Kelly	SA	3:59	Failed on Dragon Back

=== Episode 7 ===
==== Semi-final 3 ====
This episode aired on 4 July 2021. Four competitors completed this course. Returning athlete Mike Snow received a second chance advantage for the Grand Final, after beating Alex Bigg on the Power Tower.

- Log Runner
- Double Dipper
- Pipe Climber
- Flying Shelf Grab to Corkscrew
- Dragon Back
- Warped Wall
- Spinball Wizard
- Spider Jump
- Chimney Rope Climb

Top 8 Competitors
Rank	Competitor	State	Time	Furthest Obstacle
1	Mike Snow	VIC	4:52	Completed
2	Alex Bigg	SA	6:01	Completed
3	Todd Smith	QLD	6:34	Completed
4	Sam Goodall	WA	7:41	Completed
5	Josh O'Sullivan	NSW	4:18	Failed on Spinball Wizard
6	Le Hua	QLD	4:19	Failed on Spinball Wizard
7	Troy Cullen	VIC	4:57	Failed on Spinball Wizard
8	Jeremy Soffe	WA	5:04	Failed on Spinball Wizard

=== Episode 8 ===
==== Grand Final, Stage 1 ====
This episode aired on 5 July 2021. In order to move onto grand final 2 you had to complete the course. 10 Competitors managed complete this course within a time limit. The Power Tower did not appear in this episode

- Archers Steps
- Tri-Cycle
- Log Runner
- Ring Swing
- Tilting Ladders
- Warped Wall
- Rolling Log
- Swinging Spikes
- Chimney Climb

Successful completion of Stage 1
Rank	Competitor	State	Time Remaining
1	Ashlin Herbert	VIC	1:45
2	Zak Stolz	VIC	0:48
3	Jake Baker	VIC	0:43
4	Alex Bigg	SA	0:35
5	Bryson Klein	NSW	0:31
6	Rob Patterson	QLD	0:31
7	Charlie Robbins	VIC	0:23
8	Ben Polson	WA	0:23
9	Olivia Vivian	WA	0:20
10	Mike Snow	VIC	0:13

=== Episode 9 ===
==== Grand Final, Stage 2 ====
This episode aired on 6 July 2021. In order to move onto grand final 2, you had to complete the course. Two Competitors managed to complete this course. The Power Tower did not appear in this episode.

- Rolling Steel
- Salmon Ladder to Unstable Bridge
- I-Beam Gap
- Spin Hopper
- Dungeon
- Crazy Cliffhanger to Rope

Successful completion of Stage 2
Rank	Competitor	State	Time Remaining
1	Charlie Robbins	VIC	0:16
2	Zak Stolz	VIC	0:06

== Obstacles by episode ==
=== Heats (episodes 1-4) ===
Heat 1	Heat 2	Heat 3	Heat 4
Shrinking Steps	Shrinking Steps	Shrinking Steps	Shrinking Steps
Big Dipper to Pole Rider	Big Dipper to Rope	Big Dipper to Rope	Big Dipper to Pole Rider
Cyclone Spinner	Cyclone Spinner	Cyclone Spinner	Cyclone Spinner
Obstacle A: Flying Shelf Grab	Obstacle A: Peg Board	Obstacle A: Flying Shelf Grab	Obstacle A: Peg Board
Obstacle A: Floating Monkey	Obstacle A: Bar Hop	Obstacle A: Floating Monkey	Obstacle A: Bar Hop
Obstacle B: Ring Chaser	Obstacle B: Weight For It	Obstacle B: Ring Chaser	Obstacle B: Weight For It
Obstacle B: Clockwork	Obstacle B: Beehive	Obstacle B: Clockwork	Obstacle B: Beehive
Warped Wall	Warped Wall	Warped Wall	Warped Wall

=== Semi-finals (episodes 5-7) ===
Semi-final 1	Semi-final 2	Semi-final 3
Log Runner	Log Runner	Log Runner
Double Dipper	Double Dipper	Double Dipper
Trapeze Swing	Double Tilt Ladder	Pipefitter
Flying Shelf Grab to corkscrew	Flying Shelf Grab to corkscrew	Flying Shelf Grab to corkscrew
Dragon Back	Dragon Back	Dragon Back
Warped Wall	Warped Wall	Warped Wall
Wingnuts	Spin Cycle	Spinball Wizard
Spider Jump	Spider Jump	Spider Jump
Chimney Rope Climb	Chimney Rope Climb	Chimney Rope Climb

=== Grand Finals (episodes 8-9) ===
Grand Final
Stage 1	Stage 2	Stage 3
Snake Run	Rolling Steel	Criss Cross Salmon Ladder to Slingshot
Launchpad to Trapeze	Salmon Ladder to Unstable Bridge	Doorknob Drop
Broken Bridge	I-Beam Gap	Déjà Vu
Triple Corkscrew	Spin Hopper	Vertical Limit
Ferris Wheel	Dungeon	Flying Bar
Warped Wall	Crazy Cliffhanger to Rope	
Salmon Ladder to Stair Hopper		
Barrel Roll		
Underwater Escape		

== Viewership ==
No.	Title	Air date	Timeslot	Overnight ratings		Consolidated ratings		Total viewers	Ref(s)
No.	Title	Air date	Timeslot	Viewers	Rank	Viewers	Rank	Total viewers	Ref(s)
1	Heat 1	20 June 2021	Sunday 7:00pm	795,000	3	71,000	3	866,000	
2	Heat 2	21 June 2021	Monday 7:30pm	624,000	11	64,000	8	688,000	
3	Heat 3	22 June 2021	Tuesday 7:30pm	588,000	9	84,000	8	672,000	
4	Heat 4	28 June 2021	Monday 7:30pm	617,000	13	46,000	11	663,000	
5	Semi-final 1	29 June 2021	Tuesday 7:30pm	572,000	13	56,000	12	628,000	
6	Semi-final 2	30 June 2021	Wednesday 7:30pm	615,000	11	76,000	7	691,000	
7	Semi-final 3	4 July 2021	Sunday 7:00pm	724,000	4	43,000	4	767,000	
8	Grand Final Stage 1	5 July 2021	Monday 7:30pm	709,000	8	62,000	6	771,000	
9	Grand Final Stage 2 Winner Announced	6 July 2021	Tuesday 7:30pm	815,000 918,000	6 5	66,000 107,000	6 5	881,000 1,025,000	
