= Australian Ninja Warrior season 3 =

Australian Ninja Warrior
- Season 3
- Presented by: Rebecca Maddern; Ben Fordham; Freddie Flintoff
- No. of episodes: 10

Release
- Original network: Nine Network
- Original release: 8 July – 29 July 2019

Season chronology
- ← Previous; Season 2 Next → Season 4

The third season of the sports entertainment reality competition series Australian Ninja Warrior premiered on 8 July 2019 on the Nine Network. The season is hosted by Rebecca Maddern, Ben Fordham & Freddie Flintoff.

== Format Changes ==
- Prize Money - This season offered two separate prizes, unlike previous seasons. The furthest and fastest competitor through the four stages of the grand final received $100,000. This was Charlie Robbins, who, out of the five Grand Final contestants who made it to stage 3, reached the furthest obstacle in the fastest time. There was also an additional prize of $200,000 offered for full completion of the course, which entailed making it through to stage 4, Mount Midoriyama, and successfully making the rope climb ascent in the allotted time. However, as no competitor successfully completed the third stage of the Grand Final, the 4th stage and full completion of the course remained unattempted, and the bonus prize unawarded this season.
- Warped Wall - This season included two warped walls during the heats, the ‘standard’ Warped Wall with a height of 4.25 metres and a one metre taller Mega Warped Wall (5.25 metres). The choice was up to the contestant on which to attempt however competitors were not allowed to switch between walls after failing an attempt, e.g. if they opted for the Mega Warped Wall and failed they were not allowed to switch over to the lower standard Warped Wall. If they chose the Mega Warped Wall and reached the top they won a bonus $5,000.

== Rounds ==
=== Episode 1 ===
==== Heat 1 ====
This episode aired on 8 July 2019. Only 5 competitors completed this course, with a large number of athletes bowing out on the Spinball Wizard. Returning competitor Ashlin Herbert was the only contestant to completely climb the Mega Warped Wall, and received $5,000.

- Floating Steps
- Swing Surfer
- Tuning Forks
- Rolling Steel
- Spinball Wizard
- Warped Wall or Mega Warped Wall

Top 18 Competitors
Rank	Competitor	State	Time	Furthest Obstacle
1	Ashlin Herbert	VIC	1:19	Completed on Mega Warped Wall
2	Rob Patterson	QLD	1:36	Completed
3	Danial Wyles-Wall	QLD	1:57	Completed
4	Alex Cusack	SA	3:12	Completed
5	Aurelien Apport	NSW	3:32	Completed
6	Zak Stolz	VIC	2:37	Failed on Mega Warped Wall
7	Corey Russo	VIC	0:59	Failed on Spinball Wizard
8	Cody Philp	QLD	1:10	Failed on Spinball Wizard
9	Dave Garvin	VIC	1:13	Failed on Spinball Wizard
10	Joshua Day	WA	1:16	Failed on Spinball Wizard
11	Eloni Vunakece	NSW	1:39	Failed on Spinball Wizard
12	David Allen	NSW	1:53	Failed on Spinball Wizard
13	Mark Turner	NSW	1:56	Failed on Spinball Wizard
14	Shaun Wood	NSW	2:09	Failed on Spinball Wizard
15	Lachlan Walker	NSW	2:35	Failed on Spinball Wizard
16	David Sandos	QLD	2:42	Failed on Spinball Wizard
17	Celeste Dixon	SA	2:59	Failed on Spinball Wizard
18	Bradley Vanderland	VIC	0:40	Failed on Turning Forks

=== Episode 2 ===
==== Heat 2 ====
This episode aired on 9 July 2019. Only 4 competitors completed this course. Returning favourite Bryson Klein was the only contestant to completely climb the Mega Warped Wall, and received $5,000.

- Floating Steps
- Butterfly Wall
- Tuning Forks
- Rolling Steel
- Double Squirrel
- Warped Wall or Mega Warped Wall

Top 18 Competitors
Rank	Competitor	State	Time	Furthest Obstacle
1	Alex Matthews	WA	1:29	Completed
2	Bryson Klein	NSW	1:56	Completed on Mega Warped Wall
3	James Sayers	VIC	2:01	Completed
4	Gavin Wilson	WA	2:15	Completed
5	Leonard Hermawan	VIC	2:45	Failed on Mega Warped Wall
6	Nathan Ryles	SA	3:04	Failed on Mega Warped Wall
7	Matt Filippi	QLD	3:08	Failed on Mega Warped Wall
8	Luke Shelton	WA	1:18	Failed on Double Squirrel
9	Nathan Leiminger	VIC	1:36	Failed on Double Squirrel
10	Tom Nicholson	VIC	2:02	Failed on Double Squirrel
11	Raphaela Wiget	SA	2:15	Failed on Double Squirrel
12	Rainer Scheu	QLD	0:41	Failed on Tuning Forks
13	Brian Cox	QLD	0:42	Failed on Tuning Forks
14	Luke Filippi	QLD	0:46	Failed on Tuning Forks
15	Verity Charles	WA	1:01	Failed on Tuning Forks
16	Riley Murphy	VIC	1:14	Failed on Tuning Forks
17	Le Hua	QLD	0:17	Failed on Butterfly Wall
18	India Henry	WA	0:43	Failed on Butterfly Wall

=== Episode 3 ===
==== Heat 3 ====
This episode aired on 14 July 2019. Only 5 competitors completed this course, with a large number of athletes bowing out on the Spinball Wizard.

- Floating Steps
- Swing Surfer
- Tuning Forks
- Rolling Steel
- Spinball Wizard
- Warped Wall or Mega Warped Wall

Top 18 Competitors
Rank	Competitor	State	Time	Furthest Obstacle
1	Ben Polson	WA	1:38	Completed on Mega Warped Wall
2	Jordan Papandrea	NSW	2:21	Completed on Mega Warped Wall
3	Owen Davey	ACT	2:25	Completed
4	Alex Bigg	SA	2:51	Completed on Mega Warped Wall
5	Olivia Vivian	WA	3:22	Completed
6	John Steffensen	QLD	1:33	Failed on Spinball Wizard
7	Michael Boldery	QLD	1:34	Failed on Spinball Wizard
8	Sonny Kennedy	NSW	1:40	Failed on Spinball Wizard
9	River Daz	VIC	1:44	Failed on Spinball Wizard
10	Dhani Johnson	NSW	1:46	Failed on Spinball Wizard
11	Joao Loureiro	NSW	1:55	Failed on Spinball Wizard
12	Rhys Broad	QLD	2:11	Failed on Spinball Wizard
13	Trudie Horskins	VIC	2:11	Failed on Spinball Wizard
14	Warwick Grant	VIC	2:26	Failed on Spinball Wizard
15	Gabriel Iftene	VIC	3:00	Failed on Spinball Wizard
16	Mel Armstrong	VIC	1:19	Failed on Rolling Steel
17	Cameron D'Silva	WA	0:36	Failed on Tuning Forks
18	Stewart Furze	SA	0:46	Failed on Tuning Forks

=== Episode 4 ===
==== Heat 4 ====
This episode aired on 15 July 2019. Only 3 competitors completed this course, (2 of which received $5,000 for completing the Mega Warped Wall) with a large number of athletes bowing out on the Whisked Away.

- Floating Steps
- Butterfly Wall
- Tuning Forks
- Rolling Steel
- Whisked Away
- Warped Wall or Mega Warped Wall

Top 18 Competitors
Rank	Competitor	State	Time	Furthest Obstacle
1	Todd Smith	QLD	1:49	Completed
2	Matthew Marazita	VIC	2:18	Completed on Mega Warped Wall
3	Mike Snow	VIC	2:22	Completed on Mega Warped Wall
4	Justin Flegler	QLD	1:28	Failed on Mega Warped Wall
5	Daniel Mason	VIC	2:26	Failed on Mega Warped Wall
6	Andy Dunt	SA	1:17	Failed on Whisked Away
7	Ryan Solomon	QLD	1:29	Failed on Whisked Away
8	Donny Byrne	WA	1:39	Failed on Whisked Away
9	Daniel Walker	NSW	1:39	Failed on Whisked Away
10	Jarrah Brand-Adams	QLD	1:42	Failed on Whisked Away
11	Edan Sirone	NSW	1:42	Failed on Whisked Away
12	Max Closter	VIC	1:49	Failed on Whisked Away
13	Jorge Delgado	QLD	1:54	Failed on Whisked Away
14	Billy Gray	VIC	1:57	Failed on Whisked Away
15	Rhys Landwehr	WA	2:10	Failed on Whisked Away
16	Jesse Cooke	VIC	2:16	Failed on Whisked Away
17	Ryan Turner	NSW	2:22	Failed on Whisked Away
18	Yousof Dib	NSW	2:22	Failed on Whisked Away

=== Episode 5 ===
==== Heat 5 ====
This episode aired on 16 July 2019. 8 competitors completed this course (5 of which received $5,000 for completing the Mega Warped Wall).

- Floating Steps
- Butterfly Wall
- Tuning Forks
- Rolling Steel
- Double Squirrel
- Warped Wall or Mega Warped Wall

Top 18 Competitors
Rank	Competitor	State	Time	Furthest Obstacle
1	Benjamin Lau	VIC	2:08	Completed
2	Josh O'Sullivan	NSW	2:11	Completed on Mega Warped Wall
3	Zed Colback	WA	2:17	Completed on Mega Warped Wall
4	Dylan Pawson	QLD	2:19	Completed on Mega Warped Wall
5	Fred Dorrington	QLD	2:37	Completed on Mega Warped Wall
6	Max Pertzel	VIC	2:42	Completed
7	Ben Davies	VIC	3:36	Completed
8	Winson Lam	QLD	4:05	Completed on Mega Warped Wall
9	Charlie Robbins	VIC	2:15	Failed on Mega Warped Wall
10	Matthew Bowles	WA	3:22	Failed on Mega Warped Wall
11	Sam Goodall	WA	3:41	Failed on Mega Warped Wall
12	Sam Lothringer	VIC	4:40	Failed on Mega Warped Wall
13	Jordan Morton	ACT	6:13	Failed on Mega Warped Wall
14	Ryan Blenkinship	NT	1:06	Failed on Double Squirrel
15	Nicholas Clark	VIC	1:10	Failed on Double Squirrel
16	Joe Cutler	VIC	1:36	Failed on Double Squirrel
17	Cian Maciejewski	NSW	1:59	Failed on Double Squirrel
18	Aaron Ottobre	VIC	2:08	Failed on Double Squirrel

=== Episode 6 ===
==== Semi-Final 1 ====
This episode aired on 21 July 2019.

- Archer Steps
- Rolling Log
- Razor's Edge
- Floating Stairs
- Basket Toss
- Warped Wall
- Salmon Ladder
- Flying Shelf
- Bouncing Spider
- Invisible Ladder

Top 10 Competitors
Rank	Competitor	State	Time	Furthest Obstacle
1	Ashlin Herbert	VIC	2:44	Completed
2	Daniel Mason	VIC	2:48	Completed
3	Zak Stolz	VIC	3:23	Completed
4	Matthew Bowles	WA	4:28	Completed
5	Matt Filippi	QLD	4:52	Completed
6	Stewart Furze	SA	3:49	Failed on Bouncing Spider
7	Le Hua	QLD	4:21	Failed on Bouncing Spider
8	Lachlan Walker	NSW	5:13	Failed on Bouncing Spider
9	Fred Dorrington	QLD	2:50	Failed on Flying Shelf
10	Ryan Solomon	QLD	3:02	Failed on Flying Shelf

=== Episode 7 ===
==== Semi-Final 2 ====
This episode aired on 22 July 2019.

- Archer Steps
- Rolling Log
- Razor's Edge
- Ring Toss
- Bar Hop
- Warped Wall
- Salmon Ladder
- Flying Shelf
- Bouncing Spider
- Invisible Ladder

Top 10 Competitors
Rank	Competitor	State	Time	Furthest Obstacle
1	Jordan Papandrea	NSW	3:49	Completed
2	Alex Matthews	WA	4:38	Completed
3	Mike Snow	VIC	4:42	Completed
4	Rob Patterson	QLD	3:33	Failed on Invisible Ladder
5	Owen Davey	ACT	4:50	Failed on Invisible Ladder
6	Corey Russo	VIC	5:48	Failed on Invisible Ladder
7	Matthew Marazita	VIC	6:04	Failed on Invisible Ladder
8	Andy Dunt	SA	2:51	Failed on Flying Shelf
9	Sam Goodall	WA	4:10	Failed on Flying Shelf
10	Justin Flegler	QLD	1:55	Failed on Salmon Ladder

=== Episode 8 ===
==== Semi-Final 3 ====
This episode aired on 23 July 2019. The Energiser performance of the night went to Bryson Klein.

- Archer Steps
- Rolling Log
- Razor's Edge
- Ring Toss
- Bar Hop
- Warped Wall
- Salmon Ladder
- Flying Shelf
- Bouncing Spider
- Invisible Ladder

Top 10 Competitors
Rank	Competitor	State	Time	Furthest Obstacle
1	Bryson Klein	NSW	4:01	Completed
2	Charlie Robbins	VIC	4:39	Completed
3	Josh O'Sullivan	NSW	6:31	Completed
4	Olivia Vivian	WA	6:47	Completed
5	Luke Shelton	WA	4:28	Failed on Invisible Ladder
6	Gavin Wilson	WA	6:07	Failed on Invisible Ladder
7	Nathan Ryles	SA	4:08	Failed on Flying Shelf
8	Michael Boldery	QLD	1:44	Failed on Bar Hop
9	Daniel Walker	NSW	1:49	Failed on Bar Hop
10	Danial Wyles-Wall	QLD	2:17	Failed on Bar Hop

=== Episode 9 ===
==== Grand Final, Stage 1 ====
This episode aired on 28 July 2019.

Competitors had to complete Stage 1 within 3 minutes and 15 seconds to advance to Stage 2.

- Archer Steps
- Propeller
- Spinning Log
- Swinging Cliff Hanger
- Wing Nuts
- Warped Wall
- The Hinge
- Spider Jump
- Chimney Sweep

Successful completion of Stage 1
Rank	Competitor	State	Time Remaining
1	Ashlin Herbert	VIC	1:32
2	Charlie Robbins	VIC	1:02
3	Rob Patterson	QLD	0:58
4	Daniel Mason	VIC	0:52
5	Alex Matthews	WA	0:50
6	Zak Stolz	VIC	0:45
7	Bryson Klein	NSW	0:39
8	Jordan Papandrea	NSW	0:38
9	Mike Snow	VIC	0:19
10	Josh O'Sullivan	NSW	0:11
11	Ryan Solomon	QLD	0:06

=== Episode 10 ===
This episode aired on 29 July 2019.

==== Grand Final, Stage 2 ====
Competitors had to complete Stage 2 within 2 minutes and 10 seconds.

- Rope Jungle
- I-Beam Gap
- Salmon Ladder
- Unstable Bridge
- Trapeze to Parallel Pipes
- Cat Grab
- Wall Lift

Five competitors were successful in completing the stage within the allotted time and advanced to stage 3.

Full results for Stage 2
Rank	Competitor	State	Furthest Obstacle	Time Remaining
1	Josh O'Sullivan	NSW	Completed	0:34
2	Daniel Mason	VIC	Completed	0:24
3	Charlie Robbins	VIC	Completed	0:23
4	Rob Patterson	QLD	Completed	0:20
5	Bryson Klein	NSW	Completed	0:13
6	Alex Matthews	WA	Timed out on Cat Grab	0:00
7	Zak Stolz	VIC	Failed on Cat Grab	0:09
8	Ryan Solomon	QLD	Failed on Unstable Bridge	
9	Ashlin Herbert	VIC	Failed on Salmon Ladder	
10	Jordan Papandrea	NSW	Failed on Salmon Ladder	
11	Mike Snow	VIC	Failed on I-Beam Gap	

==== Grand Final, Stage 3 ====
- Cannonball Alley
- Body Prop
- Crazy Cliffhanger
- Floating Doors
- Flying Bars

Rob Patterson failed on the Body Prop.

The other 4 contestants all made it as far as the Floating Doors, where they all fell.

There was no time limit imposed in which to complete Stage 3 and times were not shown on-screen. However, with no competitor completing the stage and with four all failing at the second last obstacle, the winner was decided as the competitor who had reached the furthest obstacle in the fastest time. In a presentation ceremony at the end of the episode it was revealed that that person was Charlie Robbins and he was declared Australian Ninja Warrior for 2019 and awarded the prize for that title.

Unranked Results for Stage 3
Competitor	State	Furthest Obstacle	2019 Season Result
Bryson Klein	NSW	Failed on Floating Doors	
Daniel Mason	VIC	Failed on Floating Doors	
Josh O'Sullivan	NSW	Failed on Floating Doors	
Charlie Robbins	VIC	Failed on Floating Doors	Winner (for fastest time to furthest obstacle)
Rob Patterson	QLD	Failed on Body Prop	

== Obstacles by episode ==
=== Heats (episodes 1-5) ===
Heat 1	Heat 2	Heat 3	Heat 4	Heat 5
Floating Steps	Floating Steps	Floating Steps	Floating Steps	Floating Steps
Swing Surfer	Butterfly Wall	Swing Surfer	Butterfly Wall	Butterfly Wall
Tuning Forks	Tuning Forks	Tuning Forks	Tuning Forks	Tuning Forks
Rolling Steel	Rolling Steel	Rolling Steel	Rolling Steel	Rolling Steel
Spinball Wizard	Double Squirrel	Spinball Wizard	Whisked Away	Double Squirrel
Warped Wall or Mega Warped Wall	Warped Wall or Mega Warped Wall	Warped Wall or Mega Warped Wall	Warped Wall or Mega Warped Wall	Warped Wall or Mega Warped Wall

=== Finals (episodes 6-10) ===
Semi-Final 1	Semi-Final 2	Semi-Final 3	Grand Final		
Semi-Final 1	Semi-Final 2	Semi-Final 3	Stage 1	Stage 2	Stage 3
Archer Steps	Archer Steps	Archer Steps	Archer Steps	Rope Jungle	Cannonball Alley
Rolling Log	Rolling Log	Rolling Log	Propeller	I-Beam Gap	Body Prop
Razor's Edge	Razor's Edge	Razor's Edge	Spinning Log	Salmon Ladder	Crazy Cliffhanger
Floating Stairs	Ring Toss	Ring Toss	Swinging Cliff Hanger	Unstable Bridge	Floating Doors
Basket Toss	Bar Hop	Bar Hop	Wing Nuts	Trapeze to Parallel Pipes	Flying Bars
Warped Wall	Warped Wall	Warped Wall	Warped Wall	Cat Grab	None
Salmon Ladder	Salmon Ladder	Salmon Ladder	The Hinge	Wall Lift	None
Flying Shelf	Flying Shelf	Flying Shelf	The Hinge	None	None
Bouncing Spider	Bouncing Spider	Bouncing Spider	Spider Jump	None	None
Invisible Ladder	Invisible Ladder	Invisible Ladder	Chimney Sweep	None	None

== Viewership ==
No.	Title	Air date	Timeslot	Overnight ratings		Consolidated ratings		Total viewers	Ref(s)
No.	Title	Air date	Timeslot	Viewers	Rank	Viewers	Rank	Total viewers	Ref(s)
1	Heat 1	8 July 2019	Monday 7:30pm	1,010,000	3	63,000	3	1,073,000	
2	Heat 2	9 July 2019	Tuesday 7:30pm	879,000	4	62,000	3	941,000	
3	Heat 3	14 July 2019	Sunday 7:00pm	899,000	3	57,000	3	956,000	
4	Heat 4	15 July 2019	Monday 7:30pm	923,000	5	65,000	3	988,000	
5	Heat 5	16 July 2019	Tuesday 7:30pm	868,000	5	82,000	3	950,000	
6	Semi-Final 1	21 July 2019	Sunday 7:00pm	998,000	3	89,000	2	1,087,000	
7	Semi-Final 2	22 July 2019	Monday 7:30pm	942,000	4	78,000	3	1,020,000	
8	Semi-Final 3	23 July 2019	Tuesday 7:30pm	887,000	6	87,000	4	974,000	
9	Grand Final Stage 1	28 July 2019	Sunday 7:00pm	1,150,000	1	44,000	1	1,194,000	
10	Grand Final Stage 2 Winner Announced	29 July 2019	Monday 7:30pm Monday 9:00pm	1,221,000 1,341,000	2 1	75,000 63,000	2 1	1,296,000 1,404,000	
