= Australian Ninja Warrior season 2 =

Australian Ninja Warrior
- Season 2
- Presented by: Rebecca Maddern; Ben Fordham; Freddie Flintoff
- No. of episodes: 12

Release
- Original network: Nine Network
- Original release: 8 July – 31 July 2018

Season chronology
- ← Previous; Season 1 Next → Season 3

The second season of the sports entertainment reality competition series Australian Ninja Warrior premiered on 8 July 2018 on the Nine Network. The season was hosted by Rebecca Maddern, Ben Fordham & Freddie Flintoff.

== Rounds ==
=== Episode 1 ===
==== Heat 1 ====
Top 20 Competitors
Rank	Competitor	State	Time	Furthest Obstacle
1	Ben Polson	WA	2:00	Finished
2	Bryson Klein	NSW	2:01	Finished
3	Daniel Walker	NSW	2:20	Finished
4	Ryan Solomon	QLD	2:27	Finished
5	Patrick Teylan	NSW	2:32	Finished
6	Mark Ravi	WA	2:34	Finished
7	Fred Dorrington	QLD	2:40	Finished
8	Damien Lees	VIC	3:09	Finished
9	David Ravi	WA	3:12	Finished
10	Adam Chatfield	WA	3:15	Finished
11	Espan Hjalmby	QLD	3:35	Finished
12	Olivia Vivian	WA	3:40	Finished
13	Agustin Rodriguez	NSW	1:34	Failed on Flying Shelf Grab
14	Clinton Cassebohm	SA	2:22	Failed on Flying Shelf Grab
15	John Templeton	QLD	2:49	Failed on Flying Shelf Grab
16	Laura Edwards	NSW	2:50	Failed on Flying Shelf Grab
17	Adam Matusz	NSW	2:58	Failed on Flying Shelf Grab
18	George Li	NSW	3:01	Failed on Flying Shelf Grab
19	Joe Kane	NSW	3:29	Failed on Flying Shelf Grab
20	Steve Choate	WA	0:51	Failed on Ball Swing to Cargo Net

=== Episode 2 ===
==== Heat 2 ====
Top 20 Competitors
Rank	Competitor	State	Time	Furthest Obstacle
1	Daniel Mason	VIC	1:24	Finished
2	Ryan Roberts	NSW	1:36	Finished
3	Shane Elisara	QLD	2:24	Finished
4	Ben Toyer	NSW	2:43	Finished
5	Andy Dunt	SA	2:54	Finished
6	Emmett Swindells	QLD	3:22	Finished
7	Chris Chan	QLD	0:58	Failed on Basket Toss
8	Zac Ryan	SA	1:05	Failed on Basket Toss
9	Sam Goodall	WA	1:19	Failed on Basket Toss
10	Travers Jamieson	QLD	1:27	Failed on Basket Toss
11	Zoe Featonby	ACT	1:31	Failed on Basket Toss
12	Tash Sergi	WA	1:52	Failed on Basket Toss
13	Louis Foundling	VIC	2:02	Failed on Basket Toss
14	Mel Armstrong	VIC	2:24	Failed on Basket Toss
15	Matt May	NSW	0:38	Failed on Bridge of Blades
16	Paul Gallen	NSW	0:40	Failed on Bridge of Blades
17	Jase Swain	QLD	0:43	Failed on Bridge of Blades
18	Sam Newton	WA	0:45	Failed on Bridge of Blades
19	Cam Simpson	NSW	0:49	Failed on Bridge of Blades
20	Dave Ferraloro	WA	0:59	Failed on Bridge of Blades

=== Episode 3 ===
==== Heat 3 ====
Top 20 Competitors
Rank	Competitor	State	Time	Furthest Obstacle
1	Josh O'Sullivan	NSW	1:49	Finished
2	Alex Matthews	WA	2:03	Finished
3	Nic Manning	NSW	2:27	Finished
4	James Wright	QLD	2:44	Finished
5	Matthew Hall	QLD	2:56	Finished
6	Matt Kirkham	NSW	2:57	Finished
7	Shane Rogers	QLD	3:05	Finished
8	Brian Sobel	NSW	3:33	Finished
9	Chris Kelly	QLD	3:38	Finished
10	Bobby Taylor	QLD	3:51	Finished
11	Betsy Burnett	NSW	4:54	Finished
12	Paul Ranger	WA	5:11	Finished
13	Matt Rutland	QLD	2:50	Failed on Warped Wall
14	Anthony Santin	SA	1:32	Failed on Big Wheels
15	Kirby Gibbons	TAS	2:29	Failed on Big Wheels
16	Anna Davey	WA	2:41	Failed on Big Wheels
17	Cian Maciejewski	NSW	2:47	Failed on Big Wheels
18	Linda Buttigieg	VIC	4:54	Failed on Big Wheels
19	Laura Dean	NSW	0:55	Failed on Bridge of Blades
20	Amy Stephenson	QLD	2:18	Failed on Bridge of Blades

=== Episode 4 ===
==== Heat 4 ====
Top 20 Competitors
Rank	Competitor	State	Time	Furthest Obstacle
1	Ashlin Herbert	VIC	0:40	Finished
2	Brodie Pawson	QLD	1:01	Finished
3	Nathan Ryles	SA	1:18	Finished
4	Mike Snow	VIC	1:21	Finished
5	Zed Colback	WA	1:22	Finished
6	Scott Evennett	NSW	1:24	Finished
7	Alex Bigg	SA	1:38	Finished
8	Jordan Papandrea	NSW	1:45	Finished
9	Jack Martin	NSW	1:48	Finished
10	James Doney	VIC	1:53	Finished
11	India Henry	WA	1:54	Finished
12	Luke Williams	SA	2:05	Finished
13	Lez Wallace	NSW	2:06	Finished
14	Georgia Bonora	VIC	4:07	Finished
15	Celeste Dixon	SA	6:07	Finished
16	Luke Trainor	VIC	3:15	Failed on Warped Wall
17	Larrissa Miller	VIC	3:38	Failed on Warped Wall
18	Jake Abel	VIC	1:38	Failed on Swinging Spikes
19	Loki Kuroi	QLD	1:50	Failed on Swinging Spikes
20	Jason Geraghty	QLD	2:01	Failed on Swinging Spikes

=== Episode 5 ===
==== Heat 5 ====
Top 20 Competitors
Rank	Competitor	State	Time	Furthest Obstacle
1	Jayden Irving	VIC	1:27	Finished
2	Jack Wilson	QLD	1:33	Finished
3	Matt Tsang	NSW	1:34	Finished
4	Tom Hazell	NSW	2:01	Finished
5	Jeffrey Merc	NSW	2:26	Finished
6	Matt Filippi	QLD	1:32	Failed on Tyre Swing
7	James Sayers	VIC	2:13	Failed on Tyre Swing
8	Gaz Griffiths	QLD	0:45	Failed on Basket Toss
9	Rob Thorncraft	NSW	0:54	Failed on Basket Toss
10	Mitchell Knott	QLD	1:06	Failed on Basket Toss
11	Zayne Wealthall	WA	1:07	Failed on Basket Toss
12	Emma Wade	NSW	1:20	Failed on Basket Toss
13	Jack Gooch	WA	1:21	Failed on Basket Toss
14	Bede Wheatland	NSW	0:26	Failed on Bridge of Blades
15	Louis Fitzsimons	NSW	0:29	Failed on Bridge of Blades
16	Kim Andrews	NSW	0:47	Failed on Bridge of Blades
17	Miki Simankevicius	VIC	0:10	Failed on Pole Rider
18	Hamish Morelli	SA	0:11	Failed on Pole Rider
19	Luke Stahl	VIC	0:11	Failed on Pole Rider
20	Nathaniel Irving	VIC	0:12	Failed on Pole Rider

=== Episode 6 ===
==== Heat 6 ====
Top 20 Competitors
Rank	Competitor	State	Time	Furthest Obstacle
1	Rob Patterson	QLD	2:18	Finished
2	Tom O'Halloran	NSW	2:23	Finished
3	Ryan Brooke	QLD	2:31	Finished
4	Cody Philp	QLD	3:13	Finished
5	Frank Crispo	VIC	3:27	Finished
6	Matthew Timms	VIC	4:03	Finished
7	Drew Harrisberg	NSW	4:12	Finished
8	Sebastian Kliesch	NSW	4:17	Finished
9	Andrea Hah	NSW	5:28	Finished
10	Stewart Furze	SA	2:47	Failed on Double Tilt Ladder
11	Tuan Nguyen	VIC	2:56	Failed on Double Tilt Ladder
12	Bronson Norrish	WA	2:59	Failed on Double Tilt Ladder
13	Tim Robards	NSW	3:47	Failed on Double Tilt Ladder
14	Ben Cossey	NSW	1:00	Failed on Swing to Cargo Net
15	Ricky Elkins	VIC	1:01	Failed on Bridge of Blades
16	Rory Garton-Smith	WA	1:26	Failed on Bridge of Blades
17	Andie Piscitelli	WA	1:41	Failed on Bridge of Blades
18	Lee Cossey	NSW	0:15	Failed on Bungee Slider to Bullet
19	Taylor DiCarlo	WA	0:21	Failed on Bungee Slider to Bullet
20	George Roueiheb	QLD	0:24	Failed on Bungee Slider to Bullet

=== Episode 7 ===
==== Semi-final 1 ====
Top 8 Competitors
Rank	Competitor	State	Time	Furthest Obstacle
1	Ashlin Herbert	VIC	2:50	Finished
2	Bryson Klein	NSW	4:33	Finished
3	Ben Polson	WA	6:15	Finished
4	Luke Williams	SA	4:51	Failed on Hourglass to Tramp to Rope
5	Jack Wilson	QLD	5:05	Failed on Hourglass to Tramp to Rope
6	Olivia Vivian	WA	5:18	Failed on Hourglass to Tramp to Rope
7	Sebastian Kliesch	NSW	5:42	Failed on Salmon Ladder to Monkey
8	Patrick Teylan	NSW	1:54	Failed on Sky Hooks

=== Episode 8 ===
==== Semi-final 2 ====
Top 8 Competitors
Rank	Competitor	State	Time	Furthest Obstacle
1	Rob Patterson	QLD	3:41	Finished
2	Alex Matthews	WA	4:46	Finished
3	Jack Gooch	WA	7:07	Finished
4	Tom O'Halloran	NSW	4:06	Failed on Hourglass to Tramp to Pole
5	Shane Rogers	QLD	2:31	Failed on Salmon Ladder to Monkey
6	Nathan Ryles	SA	2:37	Failed on Salmon Ladder to Monkey
7	Stewart Furze	SA	3:00	Failed on Salmon Ladder to Monkey
8	Ben Toyer	NSW	3:04	Failed on Salmon Ladder to Monkey

=== Episode 9 ===
==== Semi-final 3 ====
Top 8 Competitors
Rank	Competitor	State	Time	Furthest Obstacle
1	Ryan Brooke	QLD	4:06	Failed on Hourglass to Tramp to Bungee
2	Jayden Irving	VIC	4:09	Failed on Hourglass to Tramp to Bungee
3	Fred Dorrington	QLD	5:21	Failed on Hourglass to Tramp to Bungee
4	Andy Dunt	SA	5:23	Failed on Hourglass to Tramp to Bungee
5	Cody Philp	QLD	2:52	Failed on Salmon Ladder to Monkey
6	Alex Bigg	SA	3:18	Failed on Salmon Ladder to Monkey
7	Daniel Walker	NSW	3:32	Failed on Salmon Ladder to Monkey
8	Damien Lees	VIC	4:26	Failed on Salmon Ladder to Monkey

=== Episode 10 ===
==== Semi-final 4 ====
Top 8 Competitors
Rank	Competitor	State	Time	Furthest Obstacle
1	Luke Stahl	VIC	4:06	Finished
2	Jordan Papandrea	NSW	4:30	Finished
3	Josh O'Sullivan	NSW	4:52	Finished
4	Zed Colback	WA	5:10	Finished
5	Ben Cossey	NSW	3:12	Failed on Hourglass to Tramp to Cargo Net
6	Sam Goodall	WA	4:49	Failed on Hourglass to Tramp to Cargo Net
7	Emmett Swindells	QLD	2:44	Failed on Salmon Ladder to Paper Clip
8	Brian Sobel	NSW	2:54	Failed on Salmon Ladder to Paper Clip

=== Episode 11 ===
==== Grand final, stage 1 ====
Competitors through to Stage 2
Rank	Competitor	State	Time Remaining
1	Ashlin Herbert	VIC	1:29
2	Rob Patterson	QLD	1:18
3	Alex Matthews	WA	0:57
4	Bryson Klein	NSW	0:56
5	Tom O'Halloran	NSW	0:54
6	Jayden Irving	VIC	0:46
7	Ryan Brooke	QLD	0:45
8	Cody Philp	QLD	0:42
9	Ben Toyer	NSW	0:37
10	Ben Polson	WA	0:35
11	Daniel Walker	NSW	0:23
12	Zed Colback	WA	0:21
13	Stewart Furze	SA	0:21
14	Jack Wilson	QLD	0:19
15	Fred Dorrington	QLD	0:19
16	Alex Bigg	SA	0:19
17	Jordan Papandrea	NSW	0:14
18	Ben Cossey	NSW	0:14
19	Nathan Ryles	SA	0:13
20	Patrick Teylan	NSW	0:11
21	Shane Rogers	QLD	0:08
22	Brian Sobel	NSW	0:07
23	Jack Gooch	WA	0:06
24	Sam Goodall	WA	0:01

=== Episode 12 ===
==== Grand final, stage 2 ====
Top 10 Competitors
Rank	Competitor	State	Time Remaining	Furthest Obstacle
1	Rob Patterson	QLD	0:38	Failed on Unstable Bridge
2	Bryson Klein	NSW	0:33	Failed on Unstable Bridge
3	Alex Bigg	SA	0:16	Failed on Unstable Bridge
4	Cody Philp	QLD	0:59	Failed on Salmon Ladder
5	Jayden Irving	VIC	0:51	Failed on Salmon Ladder
6	Fred Dorrington	QLD	0:41	Failed on Salmon Ladder
7	Jack Gooch	WA	0:40	Failed on Salmon Ladder
8	Ben Polson	WA	0:34	Failed on Salmon Ladder
9	Tom O'Halloran	NSW	0:31	Failed on Salmon Ladder
10	Alex Matthews	WA	0:29	Failed on Salmon Ladder

== Obstacles by episode ==
Heat 1	Heat 2	Heat 3	Heat 4	Heat 5	Heat 6	Semi-final 1	Semi-final 2	Semi-final 3	Semi-final 4	Grand final	
Heat 1	Heat 2	Heat 3	Heat 4	Heat 5	Heat 6	Semi-final 1	Semi-final 2	Semi-final 3	Semi-final 4	Stage 1	Stage 2
Quintuple Steps	Quintuple Steps	Quintuple Steps	Quintuple Steps	Quintuple Steps	Quintuple Steps	Quadruple Steps	Quadruple Steps	Quadruple Steps	Quadruple Steps	Quadruple Steps	Pole Grasper
T-Slide to Punching Bag	UFO Slider	Rolling Pin to Bungee	Hang Glider	Pole Rider	Bungee Slider to Bullet	Frame Slider	Log Grip	Frame Slider	Log Grip	Silk Slider	Bar Hop
Bridge of Blades	Bridge of Blades	Bridge of Blades	Bridge of Blades	Bridge of Blades	Bridge of Blades	Broken Pipes	Broken Pipes	Broken Pipes	Broken Pipes	Broken Bridge	Spider Jump
Ball Swing to Cargo Net	Basket Toss	Rope to Cargo Net	Basket Toss	Basket Toss	Swing to Cargo Net	Swinging Peg Board	Spinball Wizard	Swinging Peg Board	Spinball Wizard	Ring Jump	Wing Nuts
Flying Shelf Grab	Pipe Climber	Big Wheels	Swinging Spikes	Tyre Swing	Double Tilt Ladder	Sky Hooks	I-Beam Cross	Battering Ram to Pipe Climber	Floating Stairs	I-Beam Gap	Rail Runner
Warped Wall	Warped Wall	Warped Wall	Warped Wall	Warped Wall	Warped Wall	Warped Wall	Warped Wall	Warped Wall	Warped Wall	Warped Wall	Salmon Ladder
						Salmon Ladder to Floating Monkey	Salmon Ladder to Floating Monkey	Salmon Ladder to Floating Monkey	Salmon Ladder to Paper Clip	Rumbling Dice	Unstable Bridge
						Hourglass to Tramp to Rope	Hourglass to Tramp to Pole Clinger	Hourglass to Tramp to Bungee	Hourglass to Tramp to Cargo Net	Flying Squirrel	Wall Lift
						Chimney to Rope Climb	Chimney to Rope Climb	Chimney to Rope Climb	Chimney to Rope Climb	Chimney Climb	

== Viewership ==
No.	Title	Air date	Timeslot	Overnight ratings		Consolidated ratings		Total viewers	Ref(s)
No.	Title	Air date	Timeslot	Viewers	Rank	Viewers	Rank	Total viewers	Ref(s)
1	Heat 1	8 July 2018	Sunday 7:00pm	929,000	3	67,000	3	995,000	
2	Heat 2	9 July 2018	Monday 7:30pm	831,000	6	59,000	6	890,000	
3	Heat 3	10 July 2018	Tuesday 7:30pm	853,000	6	51,000	6	904,000	
4	Heat 4	15 July 2018	Sunday 7:00pm	966,000	3	42,000	3	1,008,000	
5	Heat 5	16 July 2018	Monday 7:30pm	838,000	6	48,000	6	886,000	
6	Heat 6	17 July 2018	Tuesday 7:30pm	819,000	7	52,000	6	870,000	
7	Semi-final 1	22 July 2018	Sunday 7:00pm	939,000	3	46,000	4	985,000	
8	Semi-final 2	23 July 2018	Monday 7:30pm	888,000	6	58,000	6	946,000	
9	Semi-final 3	24 July 2018	Tuesday 7:30pm	778,000	7	55,000	7	833,000	
10	Semi-final 4	29 July 2018	Sunday 7:00pm	974,000	4	64,000	4	1,038,000	
11	Grand Final Stage 1	30 July 2018	Monday 7:30pm	906,000	7	86,000	7	992,000	
12	Grand Final Stage 2 Final Stage	31 July 2018	Tuesday 7:30pm	1,088,000 1,139,000	4 2	100,000 44,000	3 4	1,188,000 1,183,000	
