= Australian Ninja Warrior season 6 =

Australian Ninja Warrior
- Season 6
- Presented by: Leila McKinnon; Jim Courier; Will & Woody
- No. of episodes: 9

Release
- Original network: Nine Network
- Original release: 27 June – 11 July 2022

Season chronology
- ← Previous; Season 5

The sixth season of the sports entertainment reality competition series Australian Ninja Warrior premiered on 27 June 2022 on the Nine Network. The season is hosted by Leila McKinnon, Jim Courier and Will & Woody.

== Production ==
On 15 September 2021, the series was officially renewed for a sixth season at Nine's upfronts. In October 2021, Fordham quit as series host. In November 2021, Nine announced Maddern’s contract was not renewed and she would be leaving the network effective immediately, in which she will be resigning as the show's host. In January 2022, Jim Courier and Leila McKinnon were announced as the new hosts of the series, with Will & Woody as sideline commentators.

== Format Changes ==
- Power round - instead of the power tower, this season has the power pool. The top 4 from each round fend off in 2 rounds, beginning with a chase across the water, into a rope climb, then across 3 laches, onto another rope to the buzzer, the first ones to hit their buzzers than go to a final round where the winner receives an advantage in the semi-finals.
  - Advantage - the winner of the power pool receives an advantage for the semi-final, in which they are able to choose their opponent for the semi-final obstacle.
- Semi-finals - the semi-final obstacle course for the first time will be a head to head race, with the winner of each race heading directly to the Grand Final.
  - Advantage - the ninja who runs the fastest and furthest (or fastest to complete the obstacle) will receive an advantage in the Grand Final.
- Grand final - the grand final stage 1 obstacle course for the first time will be a head to head race, with the winner of each race continuing on the course but must complete the course within the time limit to progress to stage 2.

== Rounds ==
Underline represents the contestant who won the advantage in the semi-finals in the qualifying heats as a result of winning the head to head competition in the Power Pool.

Italics denotes female competitors.

=== Episode 1 ===
==== Heat 1 ====
This episode aired on 27 June 2022. Only eight competitors completed this course, with a large number of athletes bowing out on the Anaconda. Newcomer athlete Ash Campbell was given an advantage for the semi-finals, after beating returning athlete David Lack in the Power Pool.

- Shrinking Steps
- Eagles Claw
- Domino Effect
- Anaconda
- Ring Chaser
- Warped Wall

Top 18 Competitors
Rank	Competitor	State	Time	Furthest Obstacle
1	Ashlin Herbert	VIC	1:27	Completed
2	Ash Campbell	VIC	1:34	Completed
3	Ben Polson	WA	1:55	Completed
4	David Lack	QLD	2:05	Completed
5	Daniel Mason	VIC	2:16	Completed
6	Saxon Johnstone	NSW	2:32	Completed
7	James Sayers	VIC	2:52	Completed
8	Le Hua	QLD	2:56	Completed
9	Kahil Evans	QLD	2:29	Failed on Ring Chaser
10	Luke Schmitzer	VIC	0:43	Failed on Anaconda
11	Eloni Vunakece	NSW	1:07	Failed on Anaconda
12	Jack Hodgson	QLD	1:18	Failed on Anaconda
13	Josiah Savonoff	QLD	1:21	Failed on Anaconda
14	Kobe Teede	QLD	1:23	Failed on Anaconda
15	Troy Sitkowski	NSW	1:39	Failed on Anaconda
16	Robert Ciccarelli	NSW	2:24	Failed on Anaconda
17	Sam Goodall	WA	0:27	Failed on Domino Effect
18	Kai James	VIC	0:39	Failed on Domino Effect

=== Episode 2 ===
==== Heat 2 ====
This episode aired on 28 June 2022. Only five competitors completed this course, with a large number of athletes bowing out on the Anaconda. Returning athlete Bryson Klein was given an advantage for the semi-finals, after beating returning athlete Mat Hutchins-Read in the Power Pool.

- Shrinking Steps
- Candy Cane Rush
- Domino Effect
- Anaconda
- Weight For It
- Warped Wall

Top 18 Competitors
Rank	Competitor	State	Time	Furthest Obstacle
1	Bryson Klein	NSW	1:42	Completed
2	Alex Bigg	SA	1:43	Completed
3	Mat Hutchins-Read	NSW	2:13	Completed
4	Dylan James	NSW	2:21	Completed
5	Judith Carroll	NSW	4:10	Completed
6	Lochie Lydom	VIC	1:59	Failed on Weight For It
7	Simon Martin	SA	2:23	Failed on Weight For It
8	Khaled Mahmoud	NSW	2:26	Failed on Weight For It
9	Leium De-roo	NSW	0:43	Failed on Anaconda
10	Jordan Papandrea	NSW	0:44	Failed on Anaconda
11	Jimmy Burrow	NSW	0:57	Failed on Anaconda
12	Joshua De-roo	NSW	0:58	Failed on Anaconda
13	Paul Culloty	QLD	0:58	Failed on Anaconda
14	Aiden Princena-White	NSW	0:58	Failed on Anaconda
15	John Sterio	NSW	1:00	Failed on Anaconda
16	Skye Haddy	QLD	1:55	Failed on Anaconda
17	Ethan Princena-White	NSW	0:23	Failed on Domino Effect
18	Evan Williams	NSW	0:51	Failed on Domino Effect

=== Episode 3 ===
==== Heat 3 ====
This episode aired on 29 June 2022. Only seven competitors completed this course, with a large number of athletes bowing out on the Anaconda. Returning athlete Matthew Bowles was given an advantage for the semi-finals, after beating returning athlete Olivia Vivian in the Power Pool.

- Shrinking Steps
- Candy Cane Rush
- Domino Effect
- Anaconda
- Flying Shelf Grab to Corkscrew
- Warped Wall

Top 18 Competitors
Rank	Competitor	State	Time	Furthest Obstacle
1	Matthew Bowles	WA	1:11	Completed
2	Mike Snow	VIC	1:50	Completed
3	Olivia Vivian	WA	2:17	Completed
4	Daniel Watermann	WA	2:20	Completed
5	Alexander Cvetkovski	QLD	2:59	Completed
6	Christopher Tang	VIC	3:03	Completed
7	Ben Lewis	NSW	3:25	Completed
8	Sam Roberts	QLD	3:02	Failed on Warped Wall
9	Matt Mosca	QLD	1:52	Failed on Flying Shelf Grab to Corkscrew
10	Brodie Peace	VIC	2:08	Failed on Flying Shelf Grab to Corkscrew
11	Aurelien Schibli	NSW	2:09	Failed on Flying Shelf Grab to Corkscrew
12	Zenia Wood	QLD	3:12	Failed on Flying Shelf Grab to Corkscrew
13	Nathan Burley	QLD	0:38	Failed on Anaconda
14	Warwick Draper	VIC	0:55	Failed on Anaconda
15	Nicole Chamberlain	SA	1:24	Failed on Anaconda
16	Stewart Furze	SA	1:25	Failed on Anaconda
17	John Sterio	QLD	1:33	Failed on Anaconda
18	Ben Hunt	VIC	1:34	Failed on Anaconda

=== Episode 4 ===
==== Heat 4 ====
This episode aired on 3 July 2022. Only seven competitors completed this course, with a large number of athletes equally bowing out on the Anaconda & Ring Chaser. Returning athlete Zak Stolz was given an advantage for the semi-finals, after beating returning athlete Jake Baker in the Power Pool.

- Shrinking Steps
- Eagles Claw
- Domino Effect
- Anaconda
- Ring Chaser
- Warped Wall

Top 18 Competitors
Rank	Competitor	State	Time	Furthest Obstacle
1	Zak Stolz	VIC	1:38	Completed
2	Rob Patterson	QLD	1:56	Completed
3	Jake Baker	VIC	1:57	Completed
4	Fred Dorrington	QLD	2:12	Completed
5	Matthew Tsang	NSW	2:23	Completed
6	Haydyn Reed	QLD	2:30	Completed
7	Angus Lambe	QLD	2:37	Completed
8	Matt Bigham	SA	2:34	Failed on Ring Chaser
9	Nathan Ryles	SA	2:55	Failed on Ring Chaser
10	Andrew Luo	NSW	4:09	Failed on Ring Chaser
11	Eddie Burrill	QLD	1:29	Failed on Anaconda
12	Steven Manassah	WA	2:01	Failed on Anaconda
13	Georgia Bonora	VIC	2:11	Failed on Anaconda
14	Lisa Campbell	QLD	2:18	Failed on Anaconda
15	Todd Smith	QLD	0:07	Failed on Eagles Claw
16	Minato Thomas	NSW	0:20	Failed on Eagles Claw
17	Jordan Wysman	NSW	0:24	Failed on Eagles Claw
18	Jett Cairns	NSW	0:25	Failed on Eagles Claw

=== Episode 5 ===
==== Semi-final 1 ====
This episode aired on 4 July 2022. Two competitors completed this course. Returning athlete Olivia Vivian received a second chance advantage for the Grand Final, after being the furthest and fastest to complete the semi-final course.

- Head to Head:
- Sprinting Steps
- Launchpad to Trapeze
- Log Dash
- Salmon Ladder to Ring Toss
- Wing Nuts
- Warped Wall
- Solo Run:
- Double Dipper
- Beehive
- Dragon’s Back

Top 12 Competitors
Rank	Competitor	State	Time	Furthest Obstacle
1	Olivia Vivian	WA	4:16	Completed
2	Fred Dorrington	QLD	4:17	Completed
3	Jordan Papandrea	NSW	3:18	Failed on Dragon’s Back
4	Warwick Draper	VIC	3:33	Failed on Dragon’s Back
5	Bryson Klein	NSW	3:48	Failed on Dragon’s Back
6	James Sayers	VIC	4:15	Failed on Dragon’s Back
7	Minato Thomas	NSW	2:02	Failed on Beehive
8	Alex Bigg	SA	2:38	Failed on Beehive
9	Luke Schmitzer	VIC	2:58	Failed on Beehive
10	Matt Mosca	QLD	3:34	Failed on Beehive
11	Eddie Burrill	QLD	4:03	Failed on Beehive
12	Aiden Princena-White	NSW	1:35	Failed on Double Dipper

=== Episode 6 ===
==== Semi-final 2 ====
This episode aired on 5 July 2022. Two competitors completed this course. Returning athlete Ashlin Herbert received a second chance advantage for the Grand Final, after being the furthest and fastest to complete the semi-final course.

- Head to Head:
- Sprinting Steps
- Launchpad to Trapeze
- Log Dash
- Salmon Ladder to Ring Toss
- Wing Nuts
- Warped Wall
- Solo Run:
- Double Dipper
- Beehive
- Dragon’s Back

Top 12 Competitors
Rank	Competitor	State	Time	Furthest Obstacle
1	Ashlin Herbert	VIC	3:09	Completed
2	Le Hua	QLD	5:07	Completed
3	Ash Campbell	VIC	3:11	Failed on Dragon’s Back
4	Ben Polson	WA	3:34	Failed on Dragon’s Back
5	Saxon Johnstone	NSW	4:00	Failed on Dragon’s Back
6	Mike Snow	VIC	5:31	Failed on Dragon’s Back
7	Simon Martin	SA	3:03	Failed on Beehive
8	Andrew Luo	NSW	3:56	Failed on Beehive
9	John Sterio	QLD	2:48	Failed on Double Dipper
10	Joshua De-roo	NSW	1:01	Failed on Wing Nuts
11	Nicole Chamberlain	SA	1:37	Failed on Wing Nuts
12	Brodie Peace	VIC	0:30	Failed on Salmon Ladder to Ring Toss

=== Episode 7 ===
==== Semi-final 3 ====
This episode aired on 6 July 2022. Three competitors completed this course. Returning athlete Jake Baker received a second chance advantage for the Grand Final, after being the furthest and fastest to complete the semi-final course.

- Head to Head:
- Sprinting Steps
- Launchpad to Bag
- Log Dash
- Salmon Ladder to Ring Toss
- Dropping Shelves
- Warped Wall
- Solo Run:
- Double Dipper
- Beehive
- Dragon’s Back

Top 12 Competitors
Rank	Competitor	State	Time	Furthest Obstacle
1	Jake Baker	VIC	3:57	Completed
2	Rob Patterson	QLD	4:16	Completed
3	Matthew Bowles	WA	4:22	Completed
4	Zak Stolz	VIC	3:54	Failed on Dragon’s Back
5	Alexander Cvetkovski	QLD	4:30	Failed on Dragon’s Back
6	Daniel Watermann	WA	4:36	Failed on Dragon’s Back
7	Judith Carroll	NSW	5:29	Failed on Dragon's Back
8	Sam Goodall	WA	2:29	Failed on Double Dipper
9	Kobe Teede	QLD	2:55	Failed on Double Dipper
10	Stewart Furze	SA	3:19	Failed on Double Dipper
11	Eloni Vunakece	NSW	1:25	Failed on Dropping Shelves
12	Nathan Burley	QLD	0:16	Failed on Log Dash

=== Episode 8 ===
==== Grand Final Stage 1 ====
This episode aired on 10 July 2022. Like the semi-finals, the grand final Stage 1 course was a head-to-head race, with the winner continuing on the course but the winner needed to complete the course within the time limit of 5:10 to progress to Stage 2. 11 competitors completed the Stage 1 course and moved on to Stage 2.

- Head to Head:
- Sprinting Steps
- Launchpad to Eagles Claw
- Cat Grab
- Salmon Ladder to Bar Hop
- Spring Forward
- Warped Wall
- Solo Run:
- Lightning Bolts
- Triple Corkscrew
- Underwater Escape

Successful completion of Stage 1
Rank	Competitor	State	Time Remaining
1	Ashlin Herbert	VIC	1:05
2	Bryson Klein	NSW	0:56
3	Ash Campbell	VIC	0:53
4	Alex Bigg	SA	0:51
5	Jake Baker	VIC	0:39
6	Zak Stolz	VIC	0:31
7	Matthew Bowles	WA	0:28
8	Saxon Johnstone	NSW	0:16
9	Ben Polson	WA	0:12
10	Le Hua	QLD	0:08
11	Daniel Watermann	WA	0:04

== Obstacles by episode ==
=== Heats (episodes 1-4) ===
Heat 1	Heat 2	Heat 3	Heat 4
Shrinking Steps	Shrinking Steps	Shrinking Steps	Shrinking Steps
Eagles Claw	Candy Cane Rush	Candy Cane Rush	Eagles Claw
Domino Effect	Domino Effect	Domino Effect	Domino Effect
Anaconda	Anaconda	Anaconda	Anaconda
Ring Chaser	Weight For It	Flying Shelf Grab to Corkscrew	Ring Chaser
Warped Wall	Warped Wall	Warped Wall	Warped Wall

=== Semi-Finals (episodes 5-7) ===
Semi-Final 1	Semi-Final 2	Semi-Final 3
Head to Head:
Sprinting Steps	Sprinting Steps	Sprinting Steps
Launchpad to Trapeze	Launchpad to Trapeze	Launchpad to Bag
Log Dash	Log Dash	Log Dash
Salmon Ladder to Ring Toss	Salmon Ladder to Ring Toss	Salmon Ladder to Ring Toss
Wing Nuts	Wing Nuts	Dropping Shelves
Warped Wall	Warped Wall	Warped Wall
Solo Run:
Double Dipper	Double Dipper	Double Dipper
Beehive	Beehive	Beehive
Dragon’s Back	Dragon's Back	Dragon's Back

=== Grand Finals (episodes 8-9) ===
Stage 1	Stage 2	Stage 3	Stage 4
Head to Head:
Shrinking Steps	Battering Ram	Criss Cross Salmon Ladder to Slingshot	Mount Midoriyama
Launchpad to Eagles Claw	Thread the Needle	Deju Vu	
Cat Grab	Barrel Roll	Crazy Cliffhanger	
Salmon Ladder to Bar Hop	Air Surfer	The Dungeon	
Spring Forward	Spin Hopper to V-Formation	Flying Bar	
Warped Wall	The Inverter		
Solo Run:
Lightning Bolts			
Triple Corkscrew			
Underwater Escape			

== Viewership ==
No.	Title	Air date	Timeslot	Overnight ratings		Consolidated ratings		Total viewers	Ref(s)
No.	Title	Air date	Timeslot	Viewers	Rank	Viewers	Rank	Total viewers	Ref(s)
1	"Heat 1"	27 June 2022	Monday 7:30pm	562,000	10	—	—	562,000	
2	"Heat 2"	28 June 2022	Tuesday 7:30pm	458,000	11	—	—	458,000	
3	"Heat 3"	29 June 2022	Wednesday 7:30pm	455,000	11	—	—	455,000	
4	"Heat 4"	3 July 2022	Sunday 7:00pm	505,000	5	—	—	505,000	
5	"Semi-Final 1"	4 July 2022	Monday 7:30pm	409,000	17	—	—	409,000	
6	"Semi-Final 2"	5 July 2022	Tuesday 7:30pm	470,000	11	—	—	470,000	
7	"Semi-Final 3"	6 July 2022	Wednesday 7:30pm	500,000	11	—	—	500,000	
8	"Grand Final Stage 1"	10 July 2022	Sunday 7:00pm	599,000	6	—	—	599,000	
9	"Grand Final Stage 2 Winner Announced"	11 July 2022	Monday 7:30pm	560,000 510,000	10 13				
