= Andrea Hah =

Australian rock climber (born c.1985)

Personal information
- Born: 1985 or 1986 (age 40–41) Australia
- Occupation: Exercise physiologist
- Height: 165 cm (5 ft 5 in)
- Weight: 56 kg (123 lb)

Climbing career
- Type of climber: Bouldering and Lead
- Highest grade: 33 (5.14b)

Andrea Hah is an Australian rock climber based in Blue Mountains, known for being the first Australian woman to climb grade 33 with her ascent of Tiger Cat, and her appearance on Australian Ninja Warrior.

== Early life ==
Hah was a youth gymnast, before retiring due to injuries at age 16. She toyed with aerial skiing, Cirque du Soleil, hurdling, trampolining and diving, before transferring to rock climbing.

== Climbing career ==
Hah first came into prominence in the early 2010s after gaining sponsorship and climbing some hard routes in the Blue Mountains, including Tiger Cat (33). In 2015 she won the Australian bouldering championships.

She lives in the Blue Mountains with her husband and fellow climber Lee Cossey, working as an exercise physiologist.

=== Ninja Warrior ===
She gained some media attention after taking part in the first season of Australian Ninja Warrior and being the first woman to make it up the warped wall.

== Notable ascents ==
- 2012, Ozymandais (28), Mount Buffalo, Victoria - first flash, first free female ascent
- 2013, Tiger Cat (33), Blue Mountains, New South Wales - second Australian woman to climb 33
- 2013, Punks in the Gym (32), Arapiles, Victoria
- 2017, Freerider (27 / 5.12d), Yosemite, United States - free ascent
