= Jodie Speers =

Australian television news journalist

- Born: 22 October 1982 (age 44); Sydney, New South Wales, Australia
- Occupations: Journalist; News and television presenter
- Years active: 2009−present
- Spouse: Ben Fordham
- Children: 3

Jodie Speers (born 22 October 1982) is an Australian journalist, news and television presenter.

Speers previously presented Seven Early News.

== Career ==
In 2009, Speers became a political correspondent for the Seven Network in its Parliament House bureau.

In January 2016, Speers was appointed presenter of Seven Early News replacing Natalie Barr.

In March 2024, Speers announced her resignation from the Seven Network after 15 years with the network, with plans to pursue law degree and return to courtrooms in a different capacity.

== Personal life ==
Speers is married to former Today sports presenter and current 2GB breakfast host Ben Fordham.

In August 2014, Fordham announced on Today that his wife Jodie was pregnant with their first child. Speers gave birth to a son in December 2014. The couple had a second child in 2016.
