= Georgie Tunny =

Australian journalist and television presenter

- Born: 24 January 1991 (age 35); Brisbane, Queensland, Australia
- Education: University of Queensland
- Occupations: Journalist; television presenter
- Years active: 2012–present
- Employer: Network 10
- Television: 10 News+ 10 News Weekend
- Partner(s): Rob Mills (2018–present; engaged)

Georgina “Georgie” Tunny (born 24 January 1991) is an Australian journalist and television presenter.

She is best known for her work as a co-host of Network 10's 10 News+ and 10 News Weekend on Network 10, and was a previous presenter on The Project and ABC's News Breakfast.

== Early life and education ==
Tunny was born and raised in Brisbane, Queensland. She attended Brigidine College, Indooroopilly and the University of Queensland, graduating with a double bachelor's degree in Arts and Journalism in 2013. She began her career with an internship at The Courier-Mail.

== Career ==
=== ABC ===
Tunny began her career with the Australian Broadcasting Corporation (ABC) in 2012, initially joining the network through a broadcast internship before moving into on‑air roles.

She spent four years as part of the News Breakfast presenting team, working as a sport presenter, weather presenter, and occasional co‑host, including during the ABC's coverage of the 2020 bushfire emergency and the COVID-19 pandemic. Tunny has also worked extensively in sports journalism, serving as a reporter and producer for ABC Melbourne across radio and television, and later becoming the executive producer of the ABC program Offsiders: Summer Series.

In 2017, Tunny attempted to interview Melbourne Victory football player Mitch Austin. However, after Tunny asking her first question, Austin suffered an apparent panic attack and walked off the set. The incident attracted considerable media attention. Asked about the incident in 2022 during the I've Got News For You podcast, Tunny described the moment as "terrifying" and said that although she was concerned for Austin's welfare, she regrets being initially concerned for herself and the possible ramifications the interview would have on her career.

In August 2021, The Age published a letter from a female reader complimenting Tunny for being "a lovely natural young woman" and not "a bottle blonde with eyelash extensions or rounded cleavage", calling Tunny "a breath of fresh air, with plenty of sunshine". This prompted former News Breakfast presenter Virginia Trioli to criticise the newspaper for publishing such a letter. Editor of The Age Gay Alcorn subsequently apologised to readers and to Tunny describing it as "an inappropriate letter that should not have been published."

=== Foxtel ===
In late October 2021, it was announced Tunny would be leaving the ABC after eight years to be the host of daily News Flash segments on Foxtel's news streaming service Flash, which had been launched earlier that month.

=== Network 10 ===
After Carrie Bickmore announced she would be taking extended leave from The Project in March 2022, Tunny and Chrissie Swan were announced as Bickmore's replacements. In August 2022, it was announced Tunny had left the Flash streaming platform after she was appointed as a permanent member of The Project, as a producer, reporter and presenter. Tunny remained at The Project until the show's cancellation in June 2025. Apart from her role with The Project, Tunny was also a member of Network 10's Melbourne Cup Carnival horse racing coverage in 2021 and 2022.

In early 2025, Tunny was announced as the narrator for Network 10's Australian adaptation of House Hunters. Later that year in March, it was revealed that Tunny would compete on the forthcoming ninth season of The Amazing Race Australia alongside her fiancé Rob Mills. It is the third celebrity installment of the show. Following the cancellation of The Project in June 2025, Tunny was announced to be joining replacement show 10 News+.

In October 2025, Network 10 announced that Tunny will replace Chris Bath to host 10 News Weekend from 2026. She was announced as a host of Network 10's revival of Australian Ninja Warrior on 19 July 2026, presenting alongside Robert Irwin and Beau Ryan.

== Personal life ==
Tunny commenced a relationship with Australian singer and actor Rob Mills after he contacted her in 2018 after seeing her on News Breakfast. Mills announced on 31 December 2021 that he and Tunny were engaged.
