= Australian Ninja Warrior =

Australian competition television series

- Genre: Reality competition; Sports entertainment
- Based on: Sasuke by Ushio Higuchi
- Presented by: Rebecca Maddern; Ben Fordham; Freddie Flintoff; Shane Crawford; Nick Kyrgios; Leila McKinnon; Jim Courier; Will McMahon; Woody Whitelaw; Robert Irwin; Georgie Tunny; Beau Ryan
- Country of origin: Australia
- Original language: English
- No. of seasons: 6
- No. of episodes: 57

Production
- Production locations: Cockatoo Island, New South Wales (2017–2018; 2027–present); Spotswood, Victoria (2019); Melbourne Showgrounds (2020); Qudos Bank Arena, Sydney Olympic Park (2021–2022)
- Running time: 1 hour and 20 minutes (without ads)
- Production company: Endemol Shine Australia

Original release
- Network: Nine Network
- Release: 9 July 2017 – 11 July 2022
- Network: Network 10
- Release: 2027

Related
- Sasuke; Australian Ninja Warrior vs. The World; American Ninja Warrior; Ninja Warrior UK

Australian Ninja Warrior is an Australian sports entertainment and reality game show competition program based on the Japanese reality television series Sasuke. It focuses on a set of obstacle courses which competitors attempt to conquer; as the competition progresses, the courses increase in difficulty. The competitor who completes all of the courses in the shortest amount of time receives a cash prize and is crowned "Australian Ninja Warrior".

The series premiered on 9 July 2017 on the Nine Network. It was cancelled by the network on 15 September 2022, after six seasons. In July 2026, Network 10 obtained the rights to the series which is set to premiere in 2027 with new hosts Robert Irwin, Georgie Tunny and Beau Ryan.

== History ==
The series was announced in 2016 with applications open until 9 September 2016, with filming between November & December 2016 on Cockatoo Island. The series was officially confirmed at Nine's upfronts in November 2016 with Rebecca Maddern announced as host. A few days after the announcement, Ben Fordham was announced as second host and Freddie Flintoff as the series' sideline reporter. The series began airing on 9 July 2017.

The series was renewed for a second season during the season one final which was filmed between December 2017 & January 2018, with applications that closed by 3 September 2017. On 11 October 2017, the series was officially confirmed for renewal at Nine's upfronts, also confirming Fordham, Maddern and Flintoff returning for the second season. The second season began airing on 8 July 2018.

On 17 October 2018, the series was officially renewed for a third season at Nine's upfronts, with Fordham, Maddern and Flintoff returning. Filming for the series was relocated to Spotswood in Melbourne, and was in production from 15 November until 1 December. The third season began airing on 8 July 2019.

On 17 October 2019, the series was officially renewed for a fourth season at Nine's upfronts, with Fordham, Maddern and Flintoff returning. The series was relocated again, filming took place at Melbourne Showgrounds in Ascot Vale. Due to the COVID-19 pandemic, Nine has introduced Audience Lock-out meaning members of the public can not attend as audience, only family members of contestants were allowed to attend, as well as co-host Rebecca Maddern, who was put in self-isolation, was temporarily replaced by Shane Crawford for two heats, she has since been cleared and returned to filming. Crawford returned to the season as sideline commentator for the Semis and Grand Final after Freddie Flintoff had to fly back to the UK before coronavirus pandemic measures came into effect. The fourth season began airing on 26 July 2020.

Ben Polson became the first contestant to win after four seasons. His prize was $400,000 and the title of ‘Australian Ninja Warrior’.

Nine Network announced a fifth season on 16 September 2020. Casting applications are open until 30 November 2020. The series was again relocated, filming took place in Homebush, New South Wales. In June 2021, Nine announced Nick Kyrgios would be joining the series as a sideline commentator alongside Shane Crawford; Freddie Flintoff will not be returning due to travel challenges and a busy schedule. The fifth season began airing on 20 June 2021.

On 15 September 2021, the series was officially renewed for a sixth season at Nine's upfronts. In October 2021, Fordham quit as series host. In November 2021, Nine announced Madderns contract was not renewed and she would be leaving the network effective immediately, in which she will be resigning as the show's host. In January 2022, Jim Courier and Leila McKinnon were announced as the new hosts of the series, with Will & Woody as sideline commentators. The sixth season began airing on 27 June 2022.

On 15 September 2022, the series was cancelled by Nine and did not return for five years. Reports emerged in April 2026 that American Ninja Warrior was mounting a big revival with a new format under Network 10. The network confirmed their acquisition on 19 July, with Robert Irwin, Georgie Tunny and Beau Ryan announced as the hosts. Casting applications were open until 2 November. Filming for the series will return to Cockatoo Island, and will be in production from 13–25 January 2027.

== Format ==
Contestants must complete a series of challenging obstacles to become the next Australian Ninja Warrior and win the cash prize, which starts at $100,000. If no contestant wins in a season, the prize money increases by $100,000 and carries over to the following season until a contestant conquers Mount Midoriyama.

From the third season, the format changed slightly with the most successful contestant who goes the furthest and fastest guaranteed to win $100,000 should they not conquer the course, but will win the growing jackpot should they conquer Mount Midoriyama.

== Series overview ==
Series	Play-by-play announcer(s)	Sideline reporter	Episodes	Originally released		Prize	Result
Series	Play-by-play announcer(s)	Sideline reporter	Episodes	First released	Last released	Prize	Result
1	Rebecca Maddern; Ben Fordham	Freddie Flintoff	9	9 July 2017	25 July 2017	Winner: $100,000	Last Ninja Standing: Fred Dorrington (Failed Stage 2)
2	Rebecca Maddern; Ben Fordham	Freddie Flintoff	12	8 July 2018	31 July 2018	Winner: $200,000	Last Ninja Standing: Rob Patterson (Failed Stage 2)
3	Rebecca Maddern; Ben Fordham	Freddie Flintoff	10	8 July 2019	29 July 2019	Winner: $300,000; Last Ninja Standing: $100,000	Last Ninja Standing: Charlie Robbins (Failed Stage 3)
4	Rebecca Maddern; Ben Fordham; Shane Crawford	Freddie Flintoff; Shane Crawford	8	26 July 2020	10 August 2020	Winner: $400,000; Last Ninja Standing: $100,000	Australian Ninja Warrior: Ben Polson (Completed Stage 4)
5	Rebecca Maddern; Ben Fordham	Shane Crawford; Nick Kyrgios	9	20 June 2021	6 July 2021	Winner: $200,000; Last Ninja Standing: $100,000	Last Ninja Standing: Zak Stolz (Failed Stage 3)
6	Jim Courier; Leila McKinnon	Will & Woody	9	27 June 2022	11 July 2022	Winner: $200,000; Last Ninja Standing: $100,000	Last Ninja Standing: Zak Stolz (Failed Stage 3)

== Cast and seasons ==
Cast
Cast Member	Seasons						
Cast Member	1 (2017)	2 (2018)	3 (2019)	4 (2020)	5 (2021)	6 (2022)	7 (2027)
Ben Fordham	Host						
Rebecca Maddern	Host						
Freddie Flintoff	Sideline						
Shane Crawford				Sideline			
Nick Kyrgios					Sideline		
Leila McKinnon						Host	
Jim Courier						Host	
Will & Woody						Sideline	
Robert Irwin							Host
Georgie Tunny							Host
Beau Ryan							Host

=== Season 1 (2017) ===
The first season premiered on 9 July 2017, on the Nine Network and concluded on 25 July 2017. The season was filmed on Cockatoo Island, Sydney where 50 ninjas ran in each of the six qualifying heats, with the top 18 from each heat moving on to the Semi-finals. From the three semi finals, the top 7 competitors moved on to the Grand Final. 9 Competitors finished stage one of the Grand Final, but none completed stage two.

=== Season 2 (2018) ===
The second season premiered on 8 July 2018, on the Nine Network and concluded on 31 July 2018. The season was filmed on Cockatoo Island, Sydney. In this season there was a total of over 300 ninjas, each was placed into one of the six heats, with the top 20 in each heat advancing to the semi-finals. In each of the four semi-finals, the top 8 competitors continued to the Grand Final. In the Grand Final, stage one was completed by 24 competitors, though none of them completed stage two.

=== Season 3 (2019) ===
The third season premiered on 8 July 2019 on the Nine Network. The season was filmed in Spotswood, Victoria; and featured 200 ninjas competing across five heats. The top 18 ninjas in each heat advanced to the semi-finals, and the top ten competitors in each of the three semi-finals qualified for the Grand Final.

In the Grand Final, there were eleven ninjas who successfully completed the first stage of the course. Five competitors progressed to stage three, however all failed to complete this stage. Despite all five ninjas failing at the same obstacle, Charlie Robbins was deemed to be the "Last Ninja Standing" and awarded the $100,000 prize as he was the fastest ninja to reach this point. However, the series did not have an official "winner", as to win one must conquer the mountain. This season was the first time on Australian Ninja Warrior that any contestant had qualified for the third stage of the course.

=== Season 4 (2020) ===
The fourth season premiered on 26 July 2020, on the Nine Network. The season was filmed at Melbourne Showgrounds, Melbourne. In this season there was a total of over 140 ninjas, each was placed into one of the four heats, with the top 16 in each heat advancing to the semi-finals. In both of the two semi-finals, the top 12 competitors continued to the Grand Final where eight ninjas successfully completed the first stage of the course, four completed the second stage and three completed the third stage. Ben Polson was the fastest of the remaining three and was able to climb Mount Midoriyama in 25.56, earning him the title as the first legitimate winner of Australian Ninja Warrior and received $400,000.

=== Season 5 (2021) ===
The fifth season premiered on 20 June 2021, on the Nine Network. The season was filmed at Sydney Olympic Park, New South Wales. In this season there was a total of over 200 ninjas, each was placed into one of the four heats, with the top 20 in each heat advancing to the Semi-finals and with each winner of the Power Tower advancing straight to the Grand Final or getting a second chance advantage and winning $200,000.

=== Season 6 (2022) ===
The sixth season premiered on 27 June 2022, on the Nine Network. The season was filmed at Qudos Bank Arena in Sydney Olympic Park, New South Wales. In this season there was a total of 75 ninjas, each was placed into one of the four heats, with the top 18 in each heat advancing to the semi-finals and with each winner of the Power Pool gaining an advantage in the semi-final.

== Viewership ==
Season	Episodes	Premiered		Ended			Season average		Network
Season	Episodes	Date	Premiere viewers (millions)	Date	Finale viewers (millions)	Final stage viewers (millions)	Viewers (millions)	Rank	Network
1	9	9 July 2017	1.775	25 July 2017	2.158	2.227	1.795	1	Nine Network
2	12	8 July 2018	0.995	31 July 2018	1.188	1.183	0.978	5	Nine Network
3	10	8 July 2019	1.073	29 July 2019	1.296	1.404	1.080	3	Nine Network
4	8	26 July 2020	1.096	10 August 2020	1.144	1.272	1.028	3	Nine Network
5	9	20 June 2021	0.866	6 July 2021	0.881	1.025	0.765	7	Nine Network
6	9	27 June 2022	0.562	11 July 2022	0.560	0.510	0.503	10	Nine Network

== International broadcasts ==
On Australia Day, UK game show based channel, Challenge, announced that beginning from 18 February 2018, it would start airing episodes of Australian Ninja Warrior.

Australia Ninja Warrior is shown on Three

In 2021, UK broadcaster ITV broadcast Series 3 in the lunchtime slot.

In 2023, Dave started showing the series.

== Specials ==
=== ANW: State of Origin ===
Announced in August 2020, a two-part series set to premiere on 16 August 2020, will see the best four ninjas from each state competing against each other on a new custom built obstacle courses with the winning team receiving $100,000.

The special will have 20 returning contestants split into four groups from five different states, the power tower will also return for both parts.

Ben Poulson of Team Western Australia won the special coming head to head against Ashlin Herbert of Team Victoria in the final round, the team received $100,000 giving all four team contestants $25,000 each.

==== Courses ====
===== Night 1 =====
On Night 1, the same course is used in the first three rounds, but with different number of members (4, 2, solo) on the course that comprises 9 obstacles.

- Snake Run (1st leg, 1st leg)
- Propeller Bar to Single Rope Swing (1st, 1st)
- 6m Spinning Log (2nd, 1st)
- Salmon Ladder to 2 Flying Shelves (2nd, 1st)
- 2 Basket Tosses (3rd, 1st)
- Warped Wall (3rd, 2nd)
- Barrel Rolls (4th, 2nd)
- Spider Jump (4th, 2nd)
- Chimney Sweep with Double Door at the top to buzzer (4th, 2nd)

At the end of each stage, the fastest team advance straight to Day 2. At the end of the three stages, the two slowest team select a member compete in the power tower. The slowest is eliminated.

===== Night 2 =====
With South Australia eliminated, four remaining teams will battle in three rounds, where one team is eliminated at the end of each round.

===== Round 1 =====
In round 1, the team will be split into pairs, and each pair run course A of 6 obstacles. The team with the fewest obstacles cleared or the slowest time to finish all 12 obstacles will be eliminated. Western Australia had Sam Goodall running the course twice, but in different order because Zed Colback is medically eliminated due to a migraine.

- Rope Jungle (1st)
- Spin Hopper
- 2x Bar Hops
- Double Squirrel (2nd)
- Double Ferris Wheel
- 20/30/40 kg Wall Lifts

Team	Contestants	Team result
Western Australia	Ben Polson	Winners
Western Australia	Olivia Vivian	Winners
Western Australia	Sam Goodall	Winners
Western Australia	Zed Colback	Winners
Victoria	Zak Stolz	Runners-up
Victoria	Ashlin Herbert	Runners-up
Victoria	Charlie Robbins	Runners-up
Victoria	Mel Armstrong	Runners-up
Queensland	Rob Patterson	Eliminated Night 2
Queensland	Fred Dorrington	Eliminated Night 2
Queensland	Skye Haddy	Eliminated Night 2
Queensland	Ryan Solomon	Eliminated Night 2
New South Wales	Bryson Klein	Eliminated Night 2
New South Wales	Jordan Papandrea	Eliminated Night 2
New South Wales	Loki Kuroi	Eliminated Night 2
New South Wales	Eloni Vunakece	Eliminated Night 2
South Australia	Rapheala Wiget	Eliminated Night 1
South Australia	Rhys Menzel	Eliminated Night 1
South Australia	Jarryd Sutton	Eliminated Night 1
South Australia	Nathan Ryles	Eliminated Night 1

==== Ratings ====
No.	Title	Air date	Timeslot	Overnight ratings		Consolidated ratings		Total viewers	Ref(s)
No.	Title	Air date	Timeslot	Viewers	Rank	Viewers	Rank	Total viewers	Ref(s)
1	Night 1	16 August 2020	Sunday 7:00pm	877,000	3	53,000	3	930,000	
2	Night 2	17 August 2020	Monday 7:30pm	736,000	9	41,000	11	777,000	

=== Australian Ninja Warrior: Record Breakers ===
In 2021, the TV special follows a day after the broadcast of Grand Final. This was also the final show that Ben Fordham would be hosting. It is so called as Australian National and Guinness World Records (previously held in the American series) for each obstacle would be attempted, and AU$15,000 for each obstacle conquered, including the World Record for the highest warped wall (5.8m), the highest salmon ladder (where the final 35m Mt. Midoriama climb is replaced by a 29-rung salmon ladder climb), Ferris wheel race between Olivia Vivian and Andrea Ha, the first woman to ever made it up the warped wall.

== See also ==
- List of Australian television series
- List of programs broadcast by Nine Network
