= Eloni Vunakece =

Former Fiji international rugby league footballer

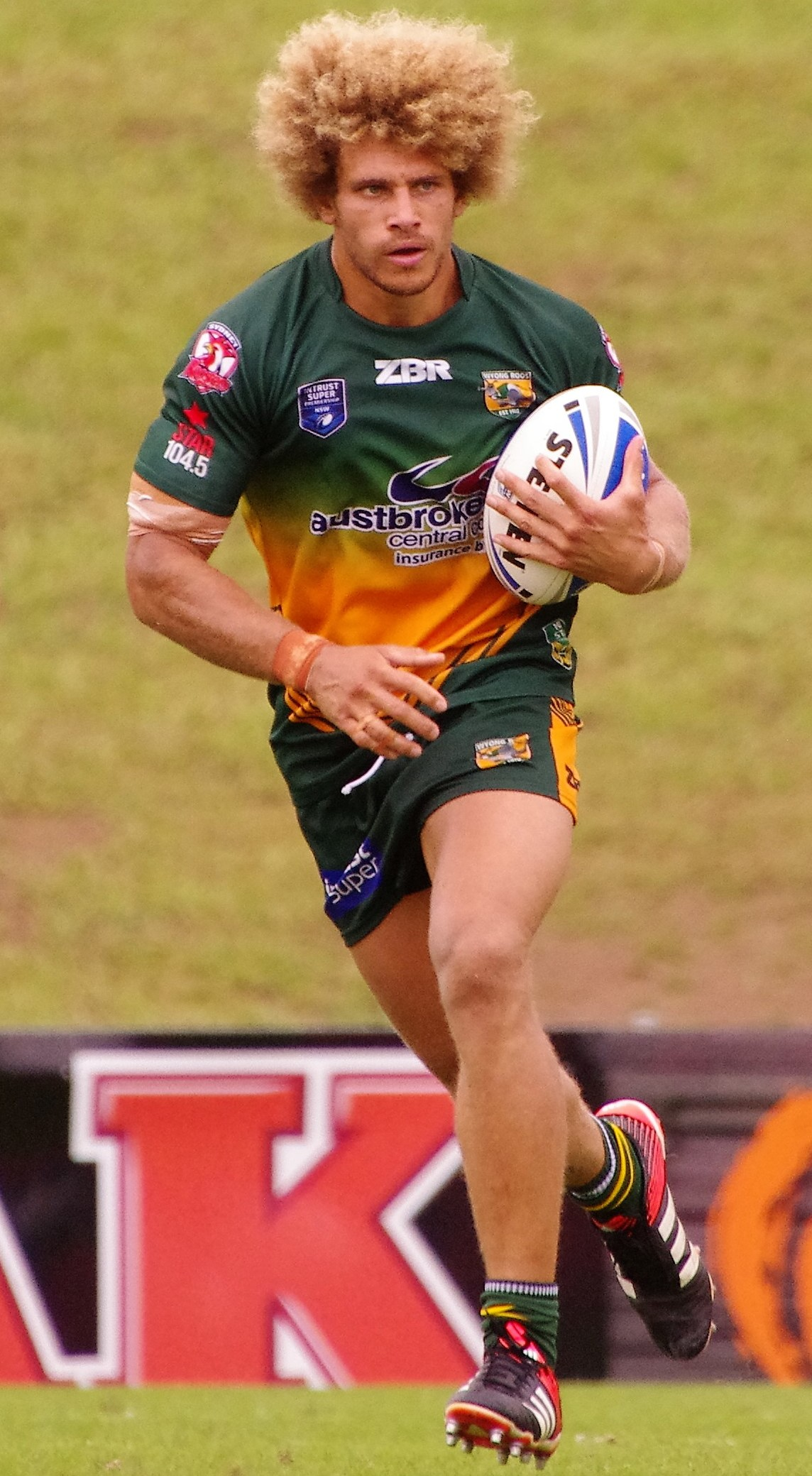

Personal information
- Born: 27 May 1987 (age 39) Sydney, New South Wales, Australia

Playing information
- Height: 187 cm (6 ft 2 in)
- Weight: 102 kg (16 st 1 lb)
- Position: Prop
Club
Years	Team	Pld	T	G	FG	P
2011–14	Toulouse Olympique	41	8	0	0	32
2016	Sydney Roosters	9	0	0	0	0
	Total	50	8	0	0	32
Representative
Years	Team	Pld	T	G	FG	P
2013–17	Fiji	15	3	0	0	12

Eloni Vunakece (born 27 May 1987) is a former Fiji international rugby league footballer who played as a prop for the Sydney Roosters in the NRL. He also played for Toulouse Olympique XIII in the French Elite One Championship.

== Background ==
Vunakece was born in Sydney, New South Wales, Australia to a Fijian father, Meli, from Tavua and an Australian mother Julie Young from St Arnaud, Victoria. He played his junior rugby league for the Holy Cross Rhinos and Leichhardt Wanderers, before being signed by the Balmain Ryde-Eastwood Tigers.

Vunakece is married with four children.

== Playing career ==
=== Early career ===
From 2006 to 2011, Vunakece played for the Balmain Ryde-Eastwood Tigers, while also having a stint with the Western Suburbs Magpies New South Wales Cup side in 2011. In September 2011, he signed a 1-year contract with French team Toulouse Olympique in the Elite One Championship. In 2012, he re-signed with Toulouse on a 1-year contract.

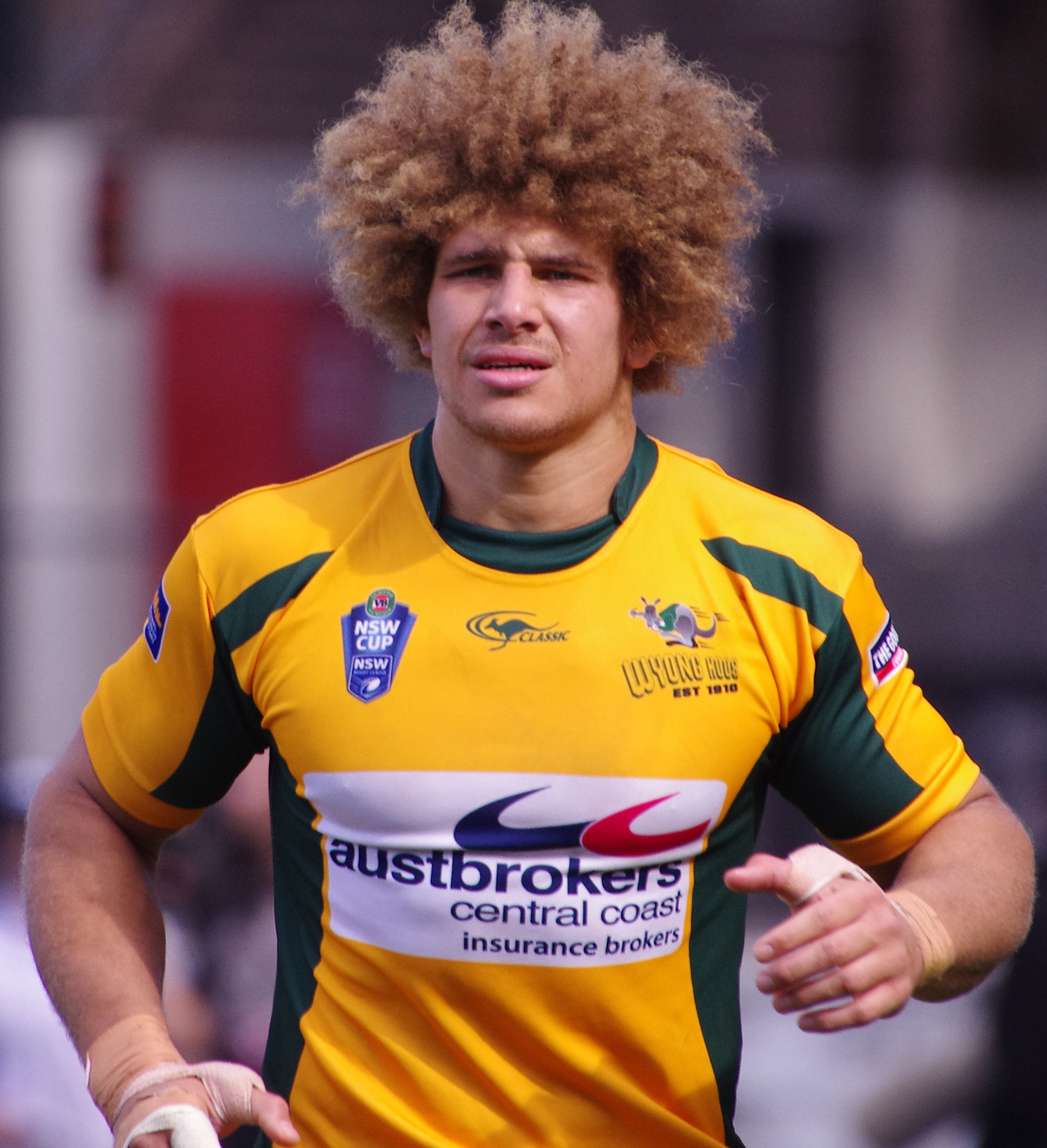
Vunakece playing for the Wyong Roos in 2013

=== 2013 ===
In April, Vunakece played in two games for Toulouse in the 2013 Challenge Cup, scoring 2 tries. At the conclusion of the 2012/2013 Elite One Championship season, he returned to Australia to play with the Wyong Roos in the New South Wales Cup. In October and November, he played 5 games for Fiji in the 2013 Rugby League World Cup, scoring 1 try.

=== 2015 ===
On 2 May, Vunakece played for Fiji against Papua New Guinea in the 2015 Melanesian Cup. At the end of the 2015 season, he got the chance to join the Sydney Roosters first-grade squad for the 2016 pre-season.

=== 2016 ===
In round 4 of the 2016 NRL season, Vunakece made his NRL debut for the Sydney Roosters against the Manly-Warringah Sea Eagles. On 7 May, he again played for Fiji against Papua New Guinea in the 2016 Melanesian Cup, where he played at lock and scored a try. In September, he was named at prop in the 2016 Intrust Super Premiership NSW Team of the Year.

=== 2017 ===
On 28 August 2017, Vunakece was named at Prop in the 2017 Intrust Super Premiership NSW team of the year.

== Post rugby league and Reality TV ==
In September 2018, Vunakece announced his retirement from rugby league. He has been working for the council as a garbage collector and also doing some modelling. He also donated his brain, currently as a living participant in post-concussion cognitive research. Vunakece competed in the Australian Ninja Warrior (season 3). He returned in seasons 4 and 5.

Vunakece will appear as a contestant on the sixth season of The Celebrity Apprentice Australia.

== Filmography ==
=== Web shows ===
Year	Title	Role	Notes	Ref.
2025	Physical: Asia	Contestant	Team Australia	
