= Olivia Vivian =

Australian artistic gymnast

- Nickname: Liv
- Born: 13 July 1989 (age 37) Perth, Western Australia, Australia
- Height: 5 ft 5 in (165 cm)

Gymnastics career
- Discipline: Women's artistic gymnastics
- Country represented: Australia
- College team: Oregon State Beavers
- Gym: WAIS
- Head coaches: Martine George and Josh Fabian
- Retired: 2016
Medal record
Representing Australia
Commonwealth Games
Silver medal – second place	2014 Glasgow	Team

Olivia Vivian (born 13 July 1989 in Perth) is an Australian artistic gymnast who competed in the 2008 Summer Olympics. After competing at the 2008 Olympics, Vivian competed for Oregon State University in NCAA gymnastics for four years. She also competed in the 2005, 2006, and 2014 World Championships. Vivian won a silver medal with the Australian team at the 2014 Commonwealth Games. In 2020, she was one of several former gymnasts to speak out about a "toxic" culture within the country's elite programme.

== Personal life ==
Olivia Vivian was born on 13 July 1989 in Perth, Australia. Her father, Craig, was a plumber, and her mother, Gillian, is a real estate agent. She started gymnastics when she was eight after originally being in ballet. Her first gym was Claremont P.C.Y.C, and her first coach was Julia Clapsis. Her favourite apparatus was uneven bars. Her father died of cancer in 2013. In her spare time Olivia key note speaks at corporate events and hosts Ninja/gymnastics workshops at schools and sports clubs. She has a large following across her social channels and creates content to inspire others and motivate young girls to chase their dreams. She is an ambassador for Melanoma Institute in honour of her father, and she spends time promoting Funky Monkey Bars in efforts to get kids playing outdoors.

== Elite career (2005–2008) ==
Vivian competed at both the 2005 and 2006 World Championships. In 2005, she finished thirteenth on uneven bars, and in 2006, she finished twelfth on uneven bars and sixth with the team.

=== 2008 Olympics ===
Vivian was selected to represent Australia at the 2008 Summer Olympics where she competed on uneven bars. She scored a 14.925 in the qualification round which helped Australia qualify fifth into the team final. In the team final, Vivian scored a 15.100 to help Australia finish in a historic sixth place.

== Collegiate career (2009–2012) ==
Vivian competed for the Oregon State Beavers. She was limited to uneven bars her freshman year due to multiple injuries. She helped Oregon State win the 2011 PAC-10 Conference Championships, their first conference title since 1996. Vivian was also the PAC-10 Co-Champion on uneven bars, and she finished sixth at the NCAA Championships. In her senior year, she was the 2012 NCAA Regional Co-Champion on uneven bars.

== Elite comeback (2012–2016) ==
At the 2014 Commonwealth Games, Vivian competed on all four events and helped her team win the silver medal. Despite having the 4th highest bar score on the uneven bars, she did not qualify into the apparatus event finals because of the two-per country rule. She qualified eleventh into the all-around final with a score of 50.765, the highest of the Australian gymnasts. In the all-around final, she finished fifth with a score of 52.632. Vivian was selected to compete at the 2014 World Artistic Gymnastics Championships where she helped her team finish seventh.

Olivia Vivian retired from gymnastics in October of 2016, and she joined Cirque Du Soleil.

== TV appearances ==
=== Ninja Warrior ===
In 2017 she was a competitor in the inaugural season of Australian Ninja Warrior. She returned for season 2, being the only woman to make it to the Grand Final, and in season 3 became the first woman to make it to the Grand Final in two consecutive years. In 2020, she became the only female competitor worldwide to reach the second stage of the Grand Final. She also competed for Western Australia in the Australian Ninja Warrior: State of Origin special.

In 2019, Vivian participated on Team Australia in a special episode of the U.S. version, American Ninja Warrior: USA vs. The World. She returned for another edition of USA vs. The World in 2020, again on Team Australia. She also appeared in the fourth and fifth seasons of Sasuke Vietnam, becoming the first female competitor to clear Stage Two in that competition.

=== Ninja World Championships ===
In September 2019, Vivian competed in the inaugural World Obstacle Ninja World Championships in Moscow, Russia, winning the Gold Medal in 4 minutes 00 seconds. Her fastest run in the qualifying rounds of 3 minutes 15 seconds established the women's World Record for the international standard 160m long "speed" course, a format used in the American Ninja Warrior: Ninja vs. Ninja course. Vivan is the Ninja Athlete Advisory Council Chair at World Obstacle.

=== The Celebrity Apprentice ===
In September 2020, Vivian was announced as a celebrity contestant on the revived new season of The Celebrity Apprentice Australia in 2021.

== Competitive history ==
Competitive history of Olivia Vivian
Year	Event	Team	AA	VT	UB	BB	FX
2005	Australian Championships		6		3rd place, bronze medalist(s)	7	3rd place, bronze medalist(s)
2005	World Championships				13		
2006	Australian Championships		5	4	1st place, gold medalist(s)	6	8
2006	World Championships	6					
2007	WOGA Classic	2nd place, silver medalist(s)	5		1st place, gold medalist(s)		
2007	Shanghai World Cup				5	6	
2007	Australian Championships	1st place, gold medalist(s)	11		2nd place, silver medalist(s)		
2008	Australian Championships	1st place, gold medalist(s)	7		6	7	8
2008	Olympic Games	6					
2013	Australian Championships				1st place, gold medalist(s)	7	
2014	Doha World Challenge Cup				4		
2014	Korea Cup				3rd place, bronze medalist(s)		5
2014	Australian Championships				2nd place, silver medalist(s)	6	3rd place, bronze medalist(s)
2014	Commonwealth Games	2nd place, silver medalist(s)	5				
2014	World Championships	7					
2016	Australian Championships		13				
