= Ben Fordham =

Australian radio presenter

- Born: 29 November 1976 (age 49); Sydney, New South Wales, Australia
- Education: St Pius X College, Sydney; Saint Ignatius' College, Riverview
- Occupations: television presenter; television host; news anchor; sports reporter; radio presenter
- Years active: 1997–present
- Employer: Nine Network
- Spouse: Jodie Speers (m. 2011)

Ben Fordham (born 29 November 1976) is an Australian sports reporter and radio presenter. As of 2023, Fordham hosts the breakfast radio program Ben Fordham Live on Sydney radio station 2GB.

== Early life and education ==
When Ben Fordham was seven years of age, he was diagnosed with epilepsy after suffering a seizure.

He did work experience at a radio station as a teenager while a student at Saint Ignatius' College, Riverview, a Catholic college in Lane Cove.

== Career ==
Fordham began his career on Sydney radio station 2UE, for which he won a Walkley Award for his coverage of the 1997 Thredbo landslide.

In 1998, Fordham moved to television and joined Sky News Australia as a reporter and presenter.

As of 2008 he was managed by the Fordham Company, which was run by his late father, John.

In March 2014, Fordham announced that he would be leaving Today at the end of the year to concentrate on his radio career. After moving into his radio position, Fordham continued to serve as a fill-in presenter on Today as well as Nine News.

In 2016, Fordham was announced as co-host of Australian Ninja Warrior alongside Rebecca Maddern on the Nine Network.

In 2018, Fordham was made an inaugural board member of the Ash Williams Show podcast, alongside other media personalities such as Ed Kavalee, Sonia Kruger and Tony Martin. Fordham was also instrumental in securing the support of Scott Pape as a permanent board member.

In May 2020, 2GB announced that Fordham would replace Alan Jones, who was retiring from radio. Fordham finished hosting his drive show on 22 May 2020 and began his new role on 1 June 2020. His breakfast show took the same name as his drive show: Ben Fordham Live.

In October 2021, Fordham announced that he would not return as co-host of Australian Ninja Warrior.

== Political views ==
Fordham is described as a conservative, regarded as being most closely aligned with the centre-right Liberal Party.

Following the defeat of the Liberal-National Coalition government at the 2022 federal election, leading to the resignation of then-outgoing Prime Minister Scott Morrison as leader of the Liberal Party and the need for a new deputy leader after then-outgoing Treasurer Josh Frydenberg lost his seat of Kooyong to teal independent Monique Ryan, Fordham endorsed Jane Hume, a Senator for Victoria, for the deputy leadership of the Liberal Party (as the Leader of the Opposition must be an incumbent member of the House of Representatives). After the party held a leadership election to replace Morrison as leader and Frydenberg as deputy leader, Peter Dutton was elected unopposed as the party's leader (and thus became the Leader of the Opposition), with Sussan Ley as his deputy.

In the lead-up to the 2023 Australian Indigenous Voice referendum, Fordham supported the No campaign.

In June 2025, Fordham criticised record-high immigration to Australia and the immigration and housing policies of Australian Prime Minister Anthony Albanese, saying on his 2GB breakfast program: "The Albanese government promised to build more houses, today they're building less. They promised to lower immigration, today, they're bringing in more." Fordham said that while Australians are not against immigration, the "speed and scale" of the government's intake of immigrants is causing concern in the community.

== Personal life ==
In October 2011, Fordham married Seven News presenter Jodie Speers. They have a son born in late 2014 and a daughter born in 2016.

== Legal issues ==
On 26 February 2009, Fordham was charged with concealing a serious crime and breaching the Listening Devices Act.

The conversation was aired on A Current Affair in May 2008, claiming to show former Waverley mayor James Markham ordering a fatal hit on a male escort. Although found guilty, Fordham and Byrne each escaped conviction, with Justice Fullerton saying it was "an appalling lack of judgment by two senior journalists who are otherwise held in esteem by their colleagues".
