= Sports entertainment =

Theatrical entertainment mimicking competitive sport

Sports entertainment is a type of spectacle which presents an ostensibly competitive event using a high level of theatrical flourish and extravagant presentation, with the purpose of entertaining an audience. Unlike typical sports and games, which are conducted for competition, sportsmanship, physical exercise or personal recreation, the primary product of sports entertainment is performance for an audience's benefit. Commonly, but not in all cases, the outcomes are predetermined; as this is an open secret, it is not considered to be match fixing.

The term was popularized by Vince McMahon of the WWE, which coined it to describe and distinguish professional wrestling from conventional sporting competitions, emphasizing its focus on entertainment and theatrical spectacle. The term sports entertainment is also used to describe a particular style of professional wrestling, most notably associated with WWE, in which places greater emphasis on character-driven storylines, theatrical presentation, and dramatic narratives.

== History ==
The term "sports entertainment" was coined by the former World Wrestling Federation (WWF, now WWE) chairman Vince McMahon during the 1980s as a marketing term to describe the industry of professional wrestling, primarily to potential advertisers, although precursors date back to February 1935, when Toronto Star sports editor Lou Marsh described professional wrestling as "sportive entertainment". In 1989, the WWF used the phrase in a case it made to the New Jersey Senate for classifying professional wrestling as "sports entertainment" and thus not subject to regulation like a directly competitive sport.

The term "sports entertainment" also became associated with the particular of style professional wrestling popularized by the WWE, which places particular emphasis on character-driven storylines, promotional segments, and the presentation of performers as entertainment personalities, in contrast to approaches that place greater emphasis on in-ring athletic performance and the presentation of matches as sporting contests. During the 2000s and 2010s, the WWE increasingly promoted the term "sports entertainment" in place of "professional wrestling" and referred to its performers as "Superstars" rather than "wrestlers", while banning terms associated with traditional professional wrestling, including "wrestling", "wrestler", "wrestling ring" (referred simply as "WWE Ring") and "fans" (referred as "WWE Universe"). This was part of WWE's effort to distance itself from the traditional wrestling industry and present its product as a mainstream entertainment brand.

Some sports entertainment events represent variants of actual sports, such as exhibition basketball with the Harlem Globetrotters or baseball with the Savannah Bananas. Others modify sport for entertainment purposes: many types of professional wrestling (which derived from traditional wrestling), and more recently many of the various mascot races held at numerous Major League Baseball games in-between innings. Roller derby was presented as a popular form of sports entertainment in the 1970s, though modern versions are legitimate competition.

Whether monster truck shows are a form of motorsport, a form of sports entertainment, or a mix of the two has been subject to debate. Generally, the competitive events at shows are unscripted and not predetermined, and feature legitimate rules and safety and performance requirements for trucks to compete at events. However, shows also feature elements of sports entertainment such as a focus on stunts, flashy truck designs, driver personalities, and theatrical production over pure competition. In addition skills competition such as freestyle at many shows are generally focused on performing for judges and entertaining the crowd and thus the result of the competition is subject to greater subjectivity than other sports.

Similar to athletes in competitive sports, many sport entertainment performers may process high athleticism, undergo significant athletic training, and face high physical demands, including injuries, though the outcomes of their performance is more subjective and based on the reaction of the crowd and the commercial success of an entertainment product the than on objective results.

== See also ==
- Barnstorm (sports)
- Exhibition game
- Kayfabe
