= Christian O'Connell =

British-born Australian radio disc jockey (b. 1973)

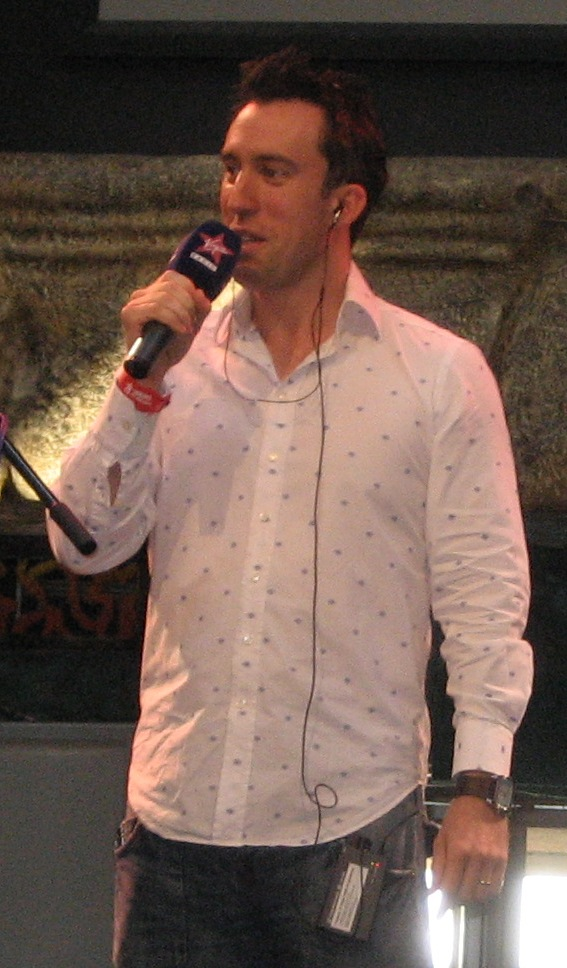
- O'Connell in September 2008
- Born: Christian Liam O'Connell; 7 April 1973 (age 53); Winchester, Hampshire, England
- Citizenship: United Kingdom; Australia
- Occupations: Radio and television presenter; writer; comedian
- Years active: 1999–present
- Known for: Presented the breakfast show on Absolute Radio until 18 May 2018. Monkey News.
- Website: Absolute Radio profile

Christian Liam O'Connell (born 7 April 1973 in Winchester, Hampshire) is an Australia-based British radio disc jockey (DJ), television host, writer and comedian.

He is currently the host of The Christian O'Connell Show, airing on weekday mornings across the Gold Network including Gold 104.3 in Melbourne, Gold 101.7 in Sydney on the FM band, and Gold DAB+ in Adelaide and Brisbane, as well as Gold 80s in Perth. A nightly hour of the program airs from 6 pm to 7 pm on Gold 104.3 in Melbourne, Gold 101.7 in Sydney, Gold 1323 in Adelaide and Gold 96FM in Perth.

== Career ==
=== Radio ===
O'Connell's first job was as a dustman in Winchester at the age of 16 in the Christmas holidays. O'Connell started on 2CR Radio in Bournemouth in 1998. He later moved to Juice FM in Liverpool in 2000. He formerly hosted BBC Radio 5 Live's weekend sports game show Fighting Talk from 2004 to 2006 and the 2013–14 season, the other presenters being BBC Football Commentator Jonathan Pearce and This Morning presenter Matt Johnson.

O'Connell hosted the Breakfast Show on indie music station XFM London from January 2001 to October 2005. While at XFM, O'Connell ran a song writing competition amongst listeners to pen an England team anthem for UEFA Euro 2004. The result was Born In England, which was recorded with the assistance of acts including Supergrass, The Libertines and Delays, as well as Bernard Butler and Northern Irish actor James Nesbitt. Released under the band name "Twisted X", the song reached Number 9 on the UK Singles Chart.

O'Connell joined the Virgin Radio team making his first broadcast on 23 January 2006. He celebrated his 10th year at Virgin (changed in September 2008 to Absolute) by giving his listeners free tins of food.

He has performed three sold-out tours of the International Edinburgh Fringe Comedy Festival in 2013, 2014, and 2015. He hosted the MacMillan Cancer comedy show at the London Palladium in 2016 and the Stand Up to Cancer show at the London Palladium in November 2017. He hosted the Q Awards between 2013 and 2017.

In February 2018, O'Connell announced that he would leave Absolute Radio and emigrate to Australia to host the Gold 104.3 breakfast programme in Melbourne. He did his last broadcast of the UK's The Christian O'Connell Breakfast Show on 18 May 2018, before starting the new show on 4 June 2018, featuring his long-running quiz "Yay or Neigh".

In April 2020, ARN announced that The Christian O'Connell Show would be syndicated across the country from 27 April, airing for one hour from 7–8 pm on weeknights on Gold 104.3 in Melbourne, Gold 101.7 in Sydney, KIIS 97.3 in Brisbane, Mix 102.3 in Adelaide and 96FM in Perth.

In November 2023, ARN announced that it had renewed O'Connell's contract until 2029.

In August 2025, it was announced that The Christian O'Connell Show would become Australia's first national commercial radio breakfast programme in 2026, broadcasting live across Melbourne, Sydney, Brisbane, Perth, and Adelaide. The show airs weekdays from 6am till 9am in Melbourne on Gold 104.3, Sydney on Gold 101.7, Brisbane on Gold DAB+, Adelaide on Gold DAB+, and in Perth on Gold 80s DAB+.

==== Shows ====
- The Christian O'Connell Breakfast Show, 2CR FM, Bournemouth (1998 – January 2000)
- The Christian O'Connell Breakfast Show, Juice FM, Liverpool (January 2000 – January 2001)
- The Christian O'Connell Breakfast Show, XFM London, (January 2001 – October 2005)
- The Christian O'Connell Breakfast Show, Virgin Radio, United Kingdom (January 2006 – September 2008)
- The Christian O'Connell Breakfast Show, Absolute Radio, United Kingdom (September 2008 – May 2018)
- The Christian O'Connell Show, Gold Network, Melbourne, Australia (June 2018 – present, Gold 104.3 Melbourne) • (January 2026 – present, National)
- The Christian O'Connell Show (Highlights), Gold 104.3 Melbourne, Gold 101.7 Sydney, Gold 1323 Adelaide and Gold 96FM Perth. (April 2020 – present)

==== Notable guests ====
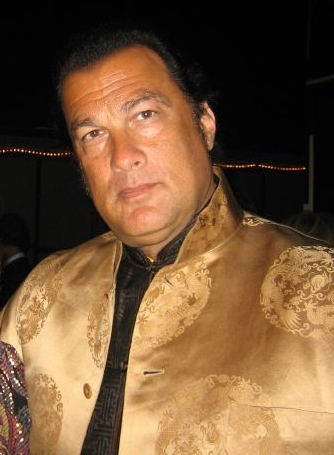
Steven Seagal, who is consistently cited by O'Connell

James Nesbitt, another friend of O'Connell's, has appeared before he moved to Virgin Radio, with a guest appearance on O'Connell's XFM show in 2004.

In 2006, after The Christian O'Connell Breakfast Show had switched to a national broadcast, O'Connell interviewed Steven Seagal. Afterwards he described the interview as "the single worst thing I've ever done on radio."

David Cameron appeared on O'Connell's Absolute Radio show twice in 2009. His second appearance caused controversy when the Conservative leader used the expletives "pissed off" (referring to the public reaction to the expenses scandal) and (in reference to Twitter) said "too many twits might make a twat" while on air.

In November 2009, Tennant co-hosted the Absolute Breakfast Show with O'Connell for three consecutive days. In October 2010, Tennant co-hosted with O'Connell and acted out Copacabana. In September 2011, Tennant experienced a fish-facing with a trout as well as a tennis ball challenge.

Australian comedy duo Hamish and Andy co-hosted a world-first simulcast with O'Connell on 18 May 2012. In 2016, O'Connell and the show joined up again for a two-day competition with a race by each of their chosen listeners to win a holiday in the UK or Australia. O'Connell's listener lost.

=== Television ===
O'Connell has appeared as a guest on a BBC2 sports show with Dickie Davies as one of the fellow guests. In 2003, O'Connell replaced Chris Moyles on Channel 5's Live With... show and went on to present the trivia show "Pub Ammo" in 2004 on the same channel. On 7 August 2004, O'Connell became the second person to host the BBC Radio 5 Live show Fighting Talk, following the departure of Johnny Vaughan. He also appeared on BBC2's Eggheads quiz show in 2005. In May 2006, O'Connell fronted Sunday Service; a Sunday evening show on Sky One. In June 2006, O'Connell started World Cuppa on ITV4.

In November 2006, he appeared on the BBC TV gameshow The Weakest Link. O'Connell went out in the 3rd round after being voted off by his contestants. O'Connell appeared as a guest in a September 2008 episode of Loose Women and Ready Steady Cook to promote his book. He later appeared a second time on a Radio DJ special in mid-2009, being voted off in Round 7. In February 2010, O'Connell appeared as a presenter, commentator and interviewer for the British Association of Mixed Martial Arts (BAMMA).

O'Connell returned to Radio 5 Live on Sunday mornings from September 2009, presenting The Christian O'Connell Solution. From 10 January 2010, it was replaced by 7 Day Sunday. From January 2011, he presented the Saturday morning 9:00–11:00 on Radio 5 Live, standing in for Danny Baker. On 18 January 2015, O'Connell hosted An Evening with Top Gear live on the official Top Gear YouTube channel, where he interviewed James May, Richard Hammond, and Jeremy Clarkson about their then-upcoming 22nd series of the show. On 17 October 2017, O'Connell took part in The Chase. In May 2019, he made a brief cameo in the Australian sitcom Neighbours. In 2020, O'Connell reached the third round of the BBC series Masterchef with his dish Cheval En Croute.

== Personal life ==
O’Connell was born in Winchester, England, and grew up on a council estate. His father, of Irish heritage, worked as a foreman for Ford at Southampton, while his mother was a nurse with the NHS. His maternal grandmother was Indian and met her husband during his service with the Gurkhas in Burma and India.

He attended the Henry Beaufort School and Peter Symonds College before studying at Nottingham Trent University. O’Connell is a supporter of Southampton F.C. in the EFL Championship and the Melbourne Demons in the Australian Football League.

O’Connell is married to his wife, Sarah. They have two daughters and currently live in Melbourne, Australia. In 2023, O'Connell officially became an Australian citizen, while retaining his British citizenship.

== Awards and accolades ==
- 2003 Sony Radio Academy Gold Award for Best UK Breakfast Show of The Year
- 2004 Sony Radio Academy Gold Award for UK DJ of The Year
- 2005 Sony Radio Academy Gold Award for Entertainment Award
- 2005 Sony Radio Academy Gold Award for National Breakfast Show of the Year
- 2005 Sony Radio Academy Gold Award For Best Competition
- 2006 Sony Radio Academy Gold Award for Sports Programme (Fighting Talk)
- 2007 Sony Radio Academy Gold Award for a Competition (Who's Calling Christian?)
- 2010 Sony Radio Academy Gold Award for Best Competition (Who's Calling Christian?)
- 2011 The Arqiva/Triple A Media Commercial Radio National Breakfast Show of the Year
- 2013 Sony Radio Academy Gold Award Music Radio Personality of The Year
- 2013 Sony Radio Academy Gold Award Best Use of Branded Content
- 2014 Arqiva Commercial Radio Awards National Presenter of The Year
- 2014 Arqiva Commercial Radio Awards Gold Winner Best UK National Breakfast show of The Year
- 2014 Arqiva Commercial Radio Awards Gold Winner Best Feature Award the 40 List
- 2014 Arqiva Commercial Radio Awards Gold Special Achievement Award
- 2016 Arqiva Commercial Radio Awards Gold Winner Best UK National Breakfast Show
- 2018 TRIC Winner Best Radio Programme UK
- 2018 Radio Academy Gold Award
