= Gold DAB+ Brisbane =

GOLD DAB+ Brisbane
- Brisbane, Queensland; Australia
- Broadcast area: Brisbane, Gold Coast, Ipswich, Sunshine Coast, Queensland
- Frequency: DAB+
- Branding: GOLD Brisbane

Programming
- Language: English
- Format: Adult contemporary
- Affiliations: GOLD Network

Ownership
- Owner: ARN Media
- Sister stations: KIIS 97.3

History
- First air date: 19 January 2026; 6 months ago

Links
- Website: brisbane.thegoldwebsite.com.au

Gold DAB+ Brisbane is a commercial DAB radio station in Brisbane, Queensland, Australia that started broadcasting on 19 January 2026. The station is owned and operated by ARN Media under the Gold branding and plays adult contemporary, and classic hits like its GOLD sister stations.

Gold DAB+ Brisbane has been compared to the previous Gold Network station in Brisbane, 4KQ, which was sold to SEN in 2022.

== Line up ==
- The Christian O'Connell Show / 6 - 9am Weekdays
- Dave (Higgo) Higgins / 9am - 12pm Weekdays
- Toni Tenaglia / 12 - 3pm Weekdays
- Jonesy & Amanda / 3 - 6pm Weekdays
- The Christian O'Connell Show at Night / 6 - 7pm Weeknights
