= The Christian O'Connell Show =

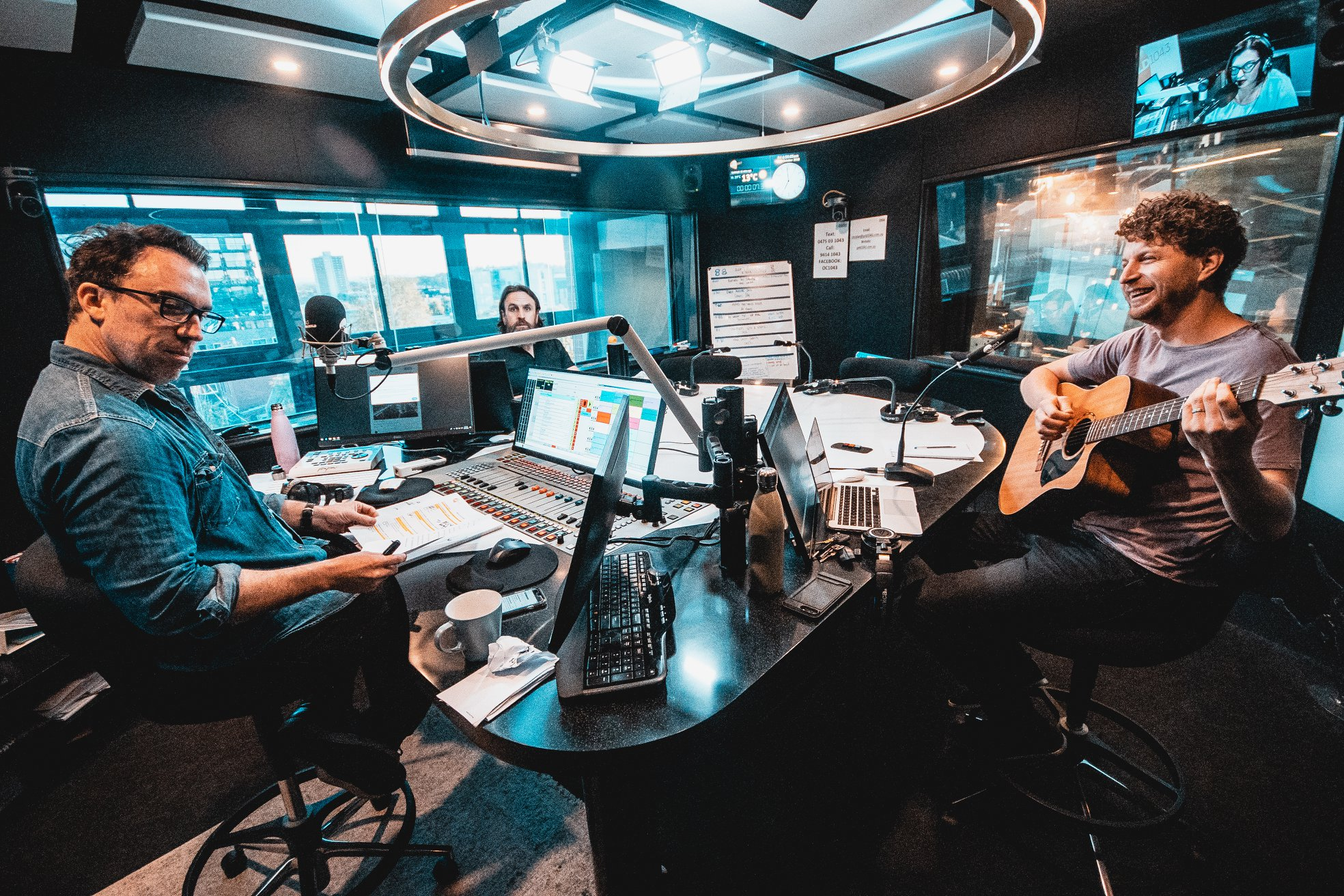
- Genre: Talk and Music
- Running time: Weekdays 6 am–9 am (Gold 104.3, Gold 101.7 and Gold DAB+); Weekdays 6 pm–7 pm (Nationally)
- Country of origin: Australia
- Language: English
- Home station: Gold 104.3
- Syndicates: GOLD Network
- Hosted by: Christian O'Connell
- Starring: Christian O'Connell; Patrina Jones; Riordan Lee
- Produced by: Caitlin McArthur (Executive Producer); Pete Deppeler (Senior Producer); Lachlan Copeland (Senior Audio Producer); Teena Karvonidis (Producer); Angie Failla (Audio Producer); Abi Upson (Digital Content Producer)
- Original release: 4 June 2018 – present
- Website: The Christian O'Connell Radio Show
- Podcast: Podcast

The Christian O'Connell Show is a radio show, hosted by Christian O'Connell. The show was originally produced in the United Kingdom, starting as The Christian O'Connell Breakfast Show on a local station in Bournemouth in 1998, going national in 2001, then moving with O'Connell to Australia in 2018. Though still broadcast live as a morning show, the word "Breakfast" has been dropped from the title to reflect the various times it airs in different Australian markets.

The show broadcasts on weekdays from 6 am and 9 am across the Gold Network including Gold 104.3 in Melbourne, Gold 101.7 in Sydney on the FM band, and Gold DAB+ in Adelaide and Brisbane, as well as Gold 80s in Perth. A nightly hour of the program is broadcast from 6 pm to 7 pm on Gold 104.3 in Melbourne, Gold 101.7 in Sydney, Gold 1323 in Adelaide, Gold 96FM in Perth and 89.3 LAFM from 7 pm to 8 pm in Tasmania.

A daily podcast of the previous morning's show is also produced.

== History ==
O'Connell started The Christian O'Connell Breakfast Show in 1998, broadcast to the local Bournemouth, England market on station 2CR FM. In January 2000, the show moved to the larger, but still local, Liverpool market, on station Juice FM. O'Connell moved to London in January 2001, where the show was broadcast on XFM London. In January 2006, the show went national in the United Kingdom, broadcasting on Virgin Radio UK. In September 2008, the broadcast moved to Virgin Radio's successor station, Absolute Radio.

In February 2018, O'Connell announced he would be leaving Absolute Radio and emigrating to Australia to host the breakfast show on Gold 104.3 in Melbourne. The final UK show was broadcast on 18 May 2018. The last song played on the show was "Nothing Lasts Forever" by Echo & the Bunnymen.

Christian started his new show on Melbourne's Gold 104.3 on Monday 4 June 2018. The first song played on air was "It's a Long Way to the Top (If You Wanna Rock 'n' Roll)" by AC/DC.

In October 2019, ARN announced that the show will remain on Gold 104.3 until 2022.

In April 2020, ARN announced that The Christian O'Connell Show will be syndicated across the country from Monday 27 April, airing for one hour from 7 pm until 8 pm on weeknights on Gold 104.3 in Melbourne, Gold 101.7 in Sydney, 97.3 FM in Brisbane, Mix 102.3 in Adelaide and 96FM in Perth. The show is highlights from the breakfast show which airs on Gold 104.3.

in February 2022, ARN announced that The Christian O'Connell Show will be further syndicated across country Victoria and New South Wales airing from 5 pm until 6 pm on 3CS Colac, 3YBFM Warrnambool, 3HA Hamilton, 3WM Horsham, 2QN Deniliquin/Echuca, 3NE Wangaratta and Gippsland’s Gold.

In November 2023, ARN announced that it had renewed Christian O'Connell's contract until 2029.

In August 2025, ARN announced that The Christian O'Connell Show will make history in 2026 as the first Australian commercial radio breakfast program to broadcast live across Sydney, Brisbane, Perth, and Adelaide via the Gold Network. The show will air live on Gold 101.7 in Sydney and Gold 104.3 in Melbourne on the FM band, while listeners in Perth, Adelaide, and Brisbane will be able to tune in via the DAB+ band.

Christian and the team spent the week of 15-19 December 2025 in Sydney to introduce the show to the city and listeners. The show officially started nationwide on 19 January 2026.

== Team ==
=== Christian O'Connell ===
Christian O'Connell (born 7 April 1973) is a British radio presenter. He began presenting on 2CR in Bournemouth in 1999, moving to Juice FM in Liverpool in 2000. He later moved to the weekday breakfast show on XFM and hosting Fighting Talk on BBC Radio 5 Live. After departing xFM, O'Connell began hosting the weekday morning breakfast show on Virgin Radio, then Absolute Radio (from 2006 - 2018) and Gold 104.3 in Melbourne, Australia.

=== Patrina Jones (Pats) ===
Patrina Jones (born 27 June) is a newsreader and regular contributor on the show. She has been the voice of Gold 104.3 breakfast news since 2012. In October 2023, Jones won an ACRA, The Glenn Daniel Award - Best News Presenter FM.

=== Riordan Lee (Rio) ===
Riordan Lee is Christian's sidekick, replacing Jack Post in 2025. He’s been part of the show’s fabric for years, having joined as a producer in January 2019, and his background spans Triple J, The Roar, and broader digital content roles.

=== Pete Deppeler (Intern Pete) ===
Intern Pete is a producer and roving reporter for the show. He started May 25, 2026 after the end of the The Kyle and Jackie O Show where he grew from an actual intern to a senior producer, roving reporter and, eventually, the talent manager for ARN.

== Regular segments ==
- At Work Timewaster: Daily, based on a news story or event from that morning's show or the previous day's show, two topics (films, bands, songs etc.) are selected and puns are encouraged fusing the two together. O'Connell and Lee put forward their suggestions before O'Connell reads out submissions sent in by listeners, which Lee jokingly rates on a Gold, Silver, Bronze scale. There is also a segment in the next day's show called "At Work: Extra Time", where they read and grade out listener's suggestions that come in after the show is over.
- Late to the Party: Christian reads emails on past topics from listeners who might not have been able to chip in on something when the show was live.
- Caller of the Week: Each week, usually Friday but could be any time, the team awards $1000 to a caller who had the best call in story of the week, or something that is really outstanding.
- Misheard Lyrics: A listener of the show has an excel document on his computer with over 300 song lyrics that he has different interpretations of. Christian shares them on the show 5 at a time, on Mondays, and then reads out listener contributions. Each is rated for whether they agree, don't agree, or if the Mondegreen is an 'Instant Hall of Famer' As of October 2026, this segment is no longer included in the podcast, likely due to royalty issues.
- Monday Winner/Lost (formerly Winning/Losing the Week): On Tuesdays, Christian asks the team if they're a Monday winner or loser. (Previously: Randomly in the week (usually Tuesdays or Wednesdays) Christian asks the team and listeners if they're winning/losing the week based on what they've experienced to that point.)
- What Are the Odds: Inspired by a caller with a strange story in February 2024, the team invites listeners to share their stories of incredible coincidences that defy logical odds.
- Small Things, Big Joy: Inspired by the Tuesday Big Rage segment, listeners are invited to share the little things that really make them happy. This segment started in June 2025.
- The People's Playlist: Every Friday, listeners pick the songs for the final hour of the show from 8am to 9am, based on a theme picked by the team. Originally this was known as The Naked Hour (which, in and of itself, started on Thursday mornings from 7-8am) Naked Hour (as a name) was retired with the exit of Jack Post, as he sang the theme song. The rebrand occurred in June 2025.
- Staff Recommendations: Top of the show on Friday mornings, Christian, Pats and Rio share what the best things they've watched, listened to, done, or read as a recommendation to listeners. This was formally known as Double Thumbs Up Friday; the name changed on Nov 6 2026.

== Podcast ==
The best bits of the show are released as a daily podcast that runs for roughly an hour's worth of material. This started with the UK version of the show and continued when it moved to Australia. Additionally, usually two mini episodes are released that focus on a specific highlight of the show, but aren't new material separate are created. These mini-episodes are also released daily and started with the Australia version of the show. Advertisements started being inserted into the main podcast as of the return of the team from Christmas/summer break in January 2022 (prior to this, new episodes were ad-free).

- After the Show Twice a month, Christian and the producers release a half hour podcast of an after show meeting, to share how they review that day's show and planning for future segments. This episode appears in the regular feed. As of February 2026, there have been no new episodes of After The Show since December 2024.

== The Brightsiders Platinum Club ==
In February 2026, the show launched its listeners’ club, created in response to the large connection the audiences developed with the program.

Members receive access to a private Facebook group, early alerts, Timewaster previews, and other exclusive content. Each member is issued a digital membership card, granted “founding member” status, and invited to choose their own membership number. Christian also sends a weekly Friday message to the group, and in‑person meet‑ups are planned as part of the community experience. To join, listeners contact the show with their preferred number and the story behind it. Additionally, it offers a behind‑the‑scenes episode.

Membership number 1 is permanently reserved for Peter Logan, a much‑loved listener who died in early 2020 following a battle with bowel cancer. Logan first contacted the show to raise awareness about screening and was invited to co‑host an episode in February 2019. His impact on O’Connell and the team was significant, and the number is held in his honour.

== Competitions & Special Events ==
=== Sing It For Melbourne ===
In mid-August 2018, the Global Liveability index was released from the Economist Intelligence Unit, which showed that Vienna had unseated Melbourne as the best city to live in. Christian, after conversing with the mayor, decided that Melbourne needed a song about how wonderful it is, somewhat similar to the idea of Ultravox's 1981 hit "Vienna", as he thought that was the only thing Vienna had over Melbourne. Jack Post wrote the song, with input from listeners.

The song reached #1 on the iTunes rock chart. All proceeds from the song are being donated to the Starlight Foundation.

=== Christian O'Connell's Gran Final ===
Leading up to the 2018 AFL Grand Final, Christian started a football competition for Melbourne Grandmas to compete in a longest kick competition. The event was held at Whitten Oval on Saturday 22 September 2018. The competition, which was entered into by more than 100 Melbourne Grans, was won by North Melbourne supporter Bronwyn Fyfe. Her winning kick was 28.54 metres long.

The Gran Final was held again on Sunday, 22 September 2019 at the Whitten Oval. This year's winner was Carmel Hine with a winning kick of 27.9 meters.

The 2022 Gran Final changed format to see how far a grandma can kick a footy over 100 cars, if they can get that many. Listeners donated their cars for this, including a hearse and the yellow Interceptor from the Mad Max movie. This competition was called "Put Your Car On The Line" (with a jingle modeled after Toto's song "Hold The Line"). The show ended up with 25 cars, all donated, at Middlepark Bowls Club. The winner was Paul, who landed his kick on the 15th car and won $5,000.

The 2024 Gran Final for the show was called the Hand Final, where contestants will be challenged to get a footy ball into a front-loading washing machine on a single handball try. The first 20 people to make the shot would win the washer. The competition was held on 26 September 2024. The first competitor's throw went wild enough to break a window, narrowly missing Jack playing the drum. The first winner was an 8-year-old who wanted to win it for his dog. Jack even threw in for a caller who couldn't make it in due to upcoming heart surgery.

=== One Last Dream ===
Christian asked bands to reunite and compete for the chance to play at One Electric Day with Jimmy Barnes and The Angels. The competition was won by Bungalow, a band who last performed in 1996.

=== Christian's $50,000 Pay Your Bills ===
Semi-regular segment (it comes and goes at different parts of the year). Listeners can enter on the Gold 104.3 website for any bill and any amount, and if chosen the bill will be paid in full.

=== Christian's $10K Power Tower ===
New contest segment as of July 2020. Christian provides a subject (such as pizza toppings, or girls names that start with the letter A), and listeners have 15 seconds to name as many things as they can in that category.

=== Christian O'Connell's Gold-A-Thon! ===
In summer 2021, during the Olympic Games in Tokyo, the gang was giving away a gold washing machine every time Australia won a gold medal. In summer 2022, the Gold-a-Thon returns for the Commonwealth Games. Every time gold is won in Birmingham, a gold kettle will be given away.

The Gold-A-Thon came back for the 2024 Paris Summer Games, with prizes from E&S and Bosch. The prizes weren't painted gold this time, however. Prizes have included a vacuum, free standing dishwasher, and a washing machine.

=== The Tradie Games ===
In July 2022, the team started a competition to find out who is the toughest, hardest working of all the tradies (tradesmen) for a $5,000 prize from Sutton Tools. Competitions included a coffee run, a reverse parking challenge, and a Tradie Pentathlon comprising wheelie heavy barrow, skip basketball, the mystery saw, hammerschlagen, the Hero's Crawl, ending in a final sprint to grab the cash. A plumber called Jason was declared the King of All Tradies.

=== The Kitchen O'Connell Show ===
In October 2022, listeners have been asked to provide short videos to win the opportunity to have Christian and the gang take the show on the road to their house. The winner will host the gang (and their equipment) in their house, along with 80s band Pseudo Echo, and win a $60,000 kitchen makeover. Ultimately, a listener called Monika in Dingley Village, who has "Melbourne's tiniest kitchen" won the competition.

=== Win a Billboard ===
In January 2023, the team had access to 100+ digital billboards all around Melbourne that could be updated in real time, with input from listeners. The team would take calls and hear stories from listeners and choose the most compelling message to put on the billboard. After a disaster that spoiled someone's marriage proposal early in the contest (known as the 'Sorry Mitch' incident), no more marriage proposals were allowed.

Win-A-Billboard returned in July 2023 and at the end of January 2024 (for two weeks).

=== Wedding in a Week ===
In February 2023, just at Valentine's Day, Christian and the team got the idea to help someone get married, as they had an officiant available to perform a ceremony with no real venue or anything else. Listeners started calling in, not only to be the folks who won the wedding, but also to offer services that the team had not thought of (like rings, or the hair/makeup for the bride). A couple named Aaron and Laura got married in "Christian's Chapel of Love" in the sales office of the radio station on Feb 17, with a cello player, serenaded by an opera singer, all put together in less than three days.

=== Christian O'Connell's Goal-A-Thon! ===
With the 2023 Women's World Cup when the Matilda's score a goal, listeners have the chance to win prizes from ENS on the next morning's show. The first gift give away is a cordless Bosch vacuum. This is likely in lieu of the Commonwealth Games not happening in Australia, which would have been the usual Gold-A-Thon activity.

=== Backpacks for Vic Kids/Christian O'Connell Live On Stage/Santa Packs ===
Near the start of the pandemic, in 2021, a caller made a plea for donations to help Backpacks for Vic Kids, which provides school backpacks for underprivileged kids. Listeners, in the span of a couple days, donated over $1 million. Christian and the team is holding a live event in August 2023 at a local club where 100% of ticket sales will benefit the charity, as they've run out of funds.

In November 2023, the show made another plea for Santa Packs for kids that are going to be in care away from families during the Christmas season as they were out of donations again. In 24 hours they raised $109,000 when they initially were hoping for $35,000. As a result, the donation will be able to fulfill most requests. While on-air Christian informed the charity that one of the directors of Chemists Warehouse is going to make a personal donation of $52,000, which would raise the total to roughly $162,000 and provide packs to over 4600 children in care.

A few days after they started, as of the end of the show on Monday 20 November, people worldwide (due to the podcast reach) had donated a total of just over $200,000, which will provide packs for 5,725 children.

On 25 August 2025, the charity was in a dire situation and the show started up another round of fundraising on the show. Notable donations include one of $60,000 contributed by a wellness foundation, an hour where the team only took $10 donations, and several donations from children of their pocket money. By the end of Friday 29 August the fund had reached just over $181,000.

=== Who's Calling Christian ===
O'Connell encourages listeners to contact celebrities and ask them to ring the show during a period of time. Originally launched on Absolute Radio, the celebrity who wins the public vote wins £10,000 for their charity, and the listener who gets them to call wins £10,000 for themselves (should a celebrity call without prompt from a listener, they will get the full £20,000). The best five telephone calls are selected by the presenters, and the listeners then vote for their favourite. In 2015, Maisie Williams was the winner, and in 2016 Judy Murray won.

Christian relaunched this competition on Gold 104.3 in Melbourne in August 2019, with 57 celebrities calling into the show. The winner was Olivia Newton-John, and her Cancer Wellness And Research Centre received $20,000. The listener who convinced Newton-John to call said he was going to donate $10,000 of his winnings to the same charity.

In September 2020, the next round of Who's Calling Christian launched, with 53 celebrities calling in. The winner was Ricky Gervais, and the charity All Dogs Matter will receive $40,000, as the listener who convinced Gervais to call in is located in the UK and therefore could not receive his $20,000 prize due to contest restrictions in the terms & conditions. Christian also surprised the second-placed celebrity, Shane Warne, the day after announcing Gervais as the winner, to give a $10,000 donation to an Australian charity supporting kids with cancer, as Christian wanted a local charity to benefit as well.

In August 2021, the next round of Who's Calling Christian launched, with a prize of $25,000. The winner was Dean Boxall and the charity Daniel Morcombe Foundation will receive $50,000. The charity itself asked Dean to call, so they get all of the prize money.

=== Grouse: The Musical ===
In September 2023, the idea of letting people who didn't have a speaking part in their school plays (so called High School Rejects) have a moment in the spotlight came to be. Listeners were invited to call in and pitch for being in the production, which was put on 26 October 2023 for one night only.

Because of legal entanglements, the team can't do the musical stage version of Grease, so they did a parody called Grouse as suggested by listeners, and it was set in Australia in the 1980s. Grouse the Musical highlights can be seen here.

=== The Cash-apult ===
In 2021, the show had the idea of creating a large catapult (6 metres tall) that would fire bags of cash at listeners, and it was dubbed the Cash-apult. It was actually made from $10,000 of Douglas Fir, but it was never used due to the pandemic lockdowns starting up, and it was proven to work. Every once in a while it is brought up as something the show would still love to do. As of November 2023, it apparently had gone missing, and a new one needs to be constructed.

=== The Longest Serve ===
In order to win tickets to the 2024 Men's Final of the Australian Open, the show had a contest called The Longest Serve that was held on Jan 24, 2024. Fifteen competitors, broken into three age groups, competed: the Young Guns (18–30-year-olds), the Seniors (30–60 years old), and the Veterans (60 and over), trying to hit a tennis ball across the Yarra River. The winner, known as Hot Shot (a member of the Seniors), with a 72-metre serve. On a second hit after he was declared winner, he completely cleared the Yarra at 70+ meters.

=== The Golden Holden ===
Upon learning that the Holden Museum was being shut down, the team started scouting for a piece of history to give away to listeners. A listener gave up his 2002 golden Holden Commodore to be restored. A parts distributor contributed parts to restore it after finding that the car needed about $40K AUS worth of work, and listeners donated 2000s-era car memorabilia such as fuzzy dice, a 5-CD stacker, and reproduced bumper stickers. Listeners just had to re-write lyrics to their favorite songs commemorating the wonder of the Holden to win.

The winner was declared on 1 March to be the listener who took on a song by Cold Chisel by listener vote. As stated in her song, she plans to take the car down to Frankston, Victoria. The winner finally got possession of her "new" car at the end of March 2024, just before the Easter holiday break, due to the extra amount of time required to work on the Holden.

=== Footy Wall Of Fame ===
The station has access to a wall on Lygon Street in Melbourne, and is going to pain a wall of fame of legends. Listeners were invited to call in during the first week of March 2024 to nominate those that represent footy for them; this could be your childhood idol, a current legendary player, or someone who is a legend to them.

=== The Bogan Cookbook ===
In March 2024, inspired by a discussion on the team, Christian started soliciting recipes from listeners for a "Bogun Cookbook" that they hope to assemble shortly. In February 2026, it was mentioned again, during the Bogan Alphabet discussion.

=== The Rebel Bin Alliance ===
At the start of May 2024, the show started looking for members of the Rebel Bin Alliance—listeners who were willing to put large stickers on their garbage bins advertising the show—turning them into bin-boards. This was in response to their marketing budget (and their trusty and reliable Lexmark printer) being taken away due to all the money being put towards promoting The Kyle and Jackie O Show, which was syndicated by the same network that promotes Christian's show. Listeners could give themselves their own rank in the army, and can request as many bin stickers as they want. Volunteers from the show and listeners are helping distribute the stickers across the neighborhoods. In May 2024, the team sent Rio out to give away prizes (like the a show beanie) to people he found with the bin stickers appearing at the curb.

=== Friday Flyday ===
Starting 17 May 2024, the team started giving away trips to the Frasier Coast for 4 nights. Listeners just email the show to enter the contest and are randomly selected as winners.

=== The 10K Beer Run ===
In May 2024, the team started up the 10K Beer Run. Listeners could call in to try to be chosen as one of the eight people who would be participating in a race down Chapel Street, holding multiple beers. If they completed the run while having the liquid below a line designated on the glass (an entire debate about the meniscus line ensued), they would win the $10K prize.

=== The Longest Pop ===
In October 2024, on Halloween, listeners gathered to compete for $5000 by seeing who could launch a champagne cork the farthest. They brought folks to the top of the station building. They had 10 seconds in which they could shake the bottle, and then a count of 3 to pop the cork.

=== Knock It Into The Park ===
Ahead of the 2025 Australian Open Finals, listeners are invited to attempt to knock a tennis ball into the service box from outside Kia Arena at Melbourne Park. 16 competitors will have two serves each. The winner will receive tickets to both the men's and women's finals, and a dinner and drinks package at Riversaide. No one landed a shot into the service box, so they took the closest to the box. The winner landed their shot 1.1m away from the target.

=== Sing It To Win It ===
In June 2025, listeners were invited to change the lyrics of their favorite Oasis song for the chance to win a trip to see the band in London at Wembley Stadium for the 4 November show. 3 finalists were chosen, who were all given tickets to the Melbourne show (along with another listener who didn't make the final). Listeners were invited to vote on who should win on 24 June 2025.

=== The Bogan Alphabet ===
In February 2026, after the show went national, Christian and the team started collecting a "Bogan Alphabet", with one word being assigned to each letter of the alphabet.

=== Bank of Christian ===
In February 2026, the Bank of Christian opened, with the opportunity for listeners to get help with any bills that need a little help. The only rule is to not blow the budget. Listeners were asked to upload the amount that they owed on the Gold 104.3 FM website, with relevant details, for the chance to win.

=== Australia's Intern ===
In October 2026, the team offered up Intern Pete to any business that wanted him, as an Intern For A Day.

== Former Team Members ==
=== Alex Cullen ===
Alex Cullen (born 28 November 1980) was the show’s resident sports expert and regular contributor. Cullen is also a news presenter for Seven News on the Seven Network. Prior to joining the show, he worked as a sports presenter on Today on the Nine Network, a reporter on Sunday Night, and a sports presenter for Seven News Sydney. He joined the show on 21 July 2025 and resigned in June 2026, with his last show on 1 June 2026.

=== Jack Post ===
Jack Post (born 10 November 1987) was O'Connell's producer and sidekick. He was previously a producer and contributor to the Hamish & Andy radio show. He continued to work on the Hamish & Andy podcast in parallel. Post resigned in May 2025, with his last show on 23 May 2025.

=== Richie Firth ===
Richard Mark Firth (born 8 May 1977) was Christian's co-host in the UK. He began working at Absolute Radio when several other members of the breakfast show left for different positions elsewhere in Absolute Radio and on other stations. Richie previously worked with O’Connell at a Bournemouth radio station, where he famously was the Travel Chicken. In 2015, he and Christian competed in and won the Red Bull Soapbox Race.

Richie is married, and is a father of three.

Firth also broadcasts on Absolute 80s between 13:00 and 16:00 every weekend. Since September 2018, he has co-hosted The Absolute Radio Hometime Show with Andy Bush.

Richie is also fond of A KFC bargain bucket that he will eat as a starter before his Sunday roast.

=== Glenn Moore ===
Glenn Moore (born 20 January 1989) joined the team as the sport newsreader in October 2017 after the departure of Matt Dyson. He is a stand-up comedian and film buff. He currently serves as the sport newsreader on The Dave Berry Breakfast Show on Absolute Radio.

=== Margaret 'Maggie' Doyle ===
Maggie from Wexford, Ireland was the sport and travel presenter on the show before moving to BBC Radio Kent. Currently she works for RTÉ.

=== Andrew Bailey ===
Andrew Bailey was the newsreader for Absolute Radio, reading the news for the Breakfast show. He left the show on 25 September 2015, as well as leaving his position as head of news across the Bauer network, joining Sky News to become Senior News Editor.

=== Faye Carruthers ===
Faye Carruthers was the sports reader and a journalist for Absolute Radio, reading the sports news for the Breakfast Show. She joined the breakfast show in June 2014 and departed in February 2017.

=== Emma Jones ===
Emma Jones (born 1988) was a newsreader. She currently serves as the newsreader for The Dave Berry Breakfast Show.

=== Jenny Barsby ===
Jenny Barsby became resident newsreader in March 2017 taking over from Matt Dyson following the departure of Faye Carruthers from the show. Her final show was on Friday 25 August 2017.

=== Matt Dyson ===
Matt Dyson was the resident sports reader on Absolute Radio until October 2017. He joined the station in October 2015 to become the resident newsreader after the departure of Andrew Bailey. Dyson left the Christian O'Connell Breakfast Show to join Dave Berry on the Absolute Radio Hometime show. Matt also co-hosts Rock n Roll Football on Absolute Radio every Saturday with Matt Forde. He formerly worked for the now defunct XFM on the Breakfast Show. He also presents the Fantasy Premier League podcast; Gameweek. Matt is known on the show for his love of Avocado Pears and as the host of duck racing, with his catch phrase "release the ducks". He currently serves as the co-host of The Dave Berry Breakfast Show and the Saturday edition of Rock 'N' Roll Football on Absolute Radio.

== Past segments ==
=== UK Show ===
- Richie Firth: Did He Really Say That?!: A listener referred to as The Samnster puts together a top 10 list of odd and ludicrous things Firth has said on the show over the week, which O'Connell counts down on a Friday. The Sammster has now released a top 100 of Firth's sayings from the breakfast show, prior to the show ending.
- Radio Times TV Schedule bingo game: Richie hosts a game around the Radio Times TV listings from years gone by, but from the same date as the current week. Richie reads the day of the week, time and synopsis [sic] of the show for the team to guess.
- Celebrity Interviews: Various famous celebrities have called the show over the years. When celebrities are unavailable, interviews are occasionally conducted with impressionist Alex Lowe.
- The Vegas Hour: Between 6 am and 7 am, topics are discussed that will not be talked about after 7 am. These are often odd or risque subjects.
- The Mug Emails: Listeners email the show with amusing anecdotes relating to the subjects being discussed by the presenters. O'Connell then reads out a selection of these emails on air throughout the show. If both O'Connell and Firth deem an anecdote to be funny enough, the sender will receive a 'Christian O'Connell Breakfast Show Mug' as a prize.
- Hitler's Toilet: A daily feature on the show at 6.50 am in which Firth reads out a comical, offbeat or vulgar news story, usually from a tabloid newspaper, which is then scrutinised by the presenters. The feature began when Firth once read out a news story about Adolf Hitler's toilet being sold at auction. This then led to a regular segment containing stories that would be considered as newsworthy as Hitler's toilet being sold at auction. Stories often feature obscure 'Top Tens', tales of animals mating or previously unheard of research from 'respected' universities. The feature formerly had a heavy bias towards stories about oversized rodents, escaped big cats and Kim Jong-Un. This segment now features on the Absolute Radio Hometime Show.
- Buzz List: Things the presenters are interested in at the moment, such as a book, app, TV show or life hack. Each member of the show gives their buzz list, followed by the listeners.
- Brian's Fantasy Guest: Brian Murphy cut together an interview with a celebrity from their 'canon of work'. This feature was often sabotaged by O'Connell.
- The Early Morning Game: A game is devised around a listeners job with a theme tune composed by Richie such as Kit Bingo, or a game devised around guessing which fish a fishmonger has slapped his colleague around the face with by the sound of the smack.
- Would you rather...: Two hypothetical statements are given and the team must pick one, such as would you rather be stuck in a lift with a clown or a badger.
- Doc Hollywood: The title of a movie is made up and O'Connell has to come up with the plot and actors.
- Phone Buckaroo: Listeners guess how long O'Connell can keep telephone psychics and sex lines talking about inane and irrelevant subjects.
- Kettle Classics
- The People Carrier of Doom
- First Friday
- The Diamante Lounge: A members club for listeners that has discounts such as 5% off at Ormskirk Arials. Membership is limited to three new members a day. Entrance to the Diamante Lounge is across a drawbridge and through a beaded curtain.
- Snack Genius: Three recipes a week are sent in for Firth to taste and declare them to be either 'snack genius' or 'snack hell'; a casting vote may be given by Christian if necessary. The recipes often contain odd combinations of food which go together surprisingly well.
- The 40 List: O'Connell attempts to tick off items on a list he wrote at the age of 13 of things he wished to accomplish before turning 40. The list includes thirteen items, such as date Kelly Le Brock, kick in Darth Vader, have an amazing splurge gun party like Bugsy Malone, and do what Ferris Bueller did when he skived off.
- Guess what's in the box: Firth walked 5 minutes from the studio to buy an item that he has placed in a box- only Firth knows what it is. Listeners call in every Friday and ask a "yes or no" question before guessing what they think is in the box. With each wrong answer the "prize pot" goes up by 99p. Each week Firth shakes the box, controversially he changed the box on 30 March 2015 to exclude the "extraneous rattle". After two months of incorrect guesses, the feature was abandoned by O'Connell. Firth revealed on the show in January 2018 that the item in the box was a bag of iced gems.
- Bus Stop: Firth would go to various bus stops around the studio and ask members of the public, unaware they were being recorded; "what you doing?" and "where you going?".
- Show in numbers: At the end of every show Firth would summarise each show in numbers.
- Reasons to be cheerful: The members of the team offer up their reasons to be cheerful and then open it up to the listeners.
- Starting Eleven: Every Monday the team picked a football starting eleven, normally in the 4–4–2 formation, of a new subject. For example: sweets, quiz show hosts, guitarists.
- Midweek Scores: On a Wednesday each presenter gives an assessment of their week with a score as if it was halftime during a football match, giving a reason for the score. Listeners then send in their own responses.
- Name game, "as in...": Listeners are invited to call in if they have a name that if they say it people always say the same thing back to them, for example "Hello my name is Chris Martin" and the response would be "as in Coldplay?". A caller will come on the line and say their full name and then Firth and O'Connell will buzz in and guess what people normally say to them when they say their name.
- Dear Aliens: An item is discussed each week with the decided best thing in that category being the thing offered up to Aliens. Categories included: dips, TV shows, takeaways, and chocolate bars.
- Win or Lose your Weekend (Monday Scores): Every Monday, the team goes over the little wins they had over the weekend, and then listeners are invited to share their wins/losses.

=== Australia show ===
- Jack Post: Did He Really Say That?: A listener called The Sammster in the U.K. provides a Top 10 list of the strange things co-host Jack Post has said during the week, which Christian counts down on Fridays. This is fairly identical to the version that was done in the UK with co-host Richie Firth. Sammster retired from providing this list to the show.
- Put It In A Decade, Baby: Jack Post lists either movies, songs, books, birth dates or events and the caller has to put them into the correct decade. They have to score 4 out of 5 correctly to win, though O'Connell often gives the contestant the prize regardless.
- Facebook Marketplace Price Is Right: Christian finds things for sale on Facebook Marketplace and has Jack and Pats guess the asking price on each item, similar to the gameplay in Price Is Right.
- Fine Pay Friday: Listeners are invited to phone in and share their fine with O'Connell and he will pay it off.
- All Request Friday: Each Friday, O'Connell will play song requests from listeners throughout the show.
- Beat the Boss: An employee and their boss are invited to answer random trivia questions. The one with the most correct answers wins: if the employee wins, they get the rest of the day off immediately; the boss gets 20 seconds of free air time to promote their business should they win.
- Dave's Amazing Historical Facts: On Wednesdays, a listener named Dave calls in and shares the history of various things (Handshakes, chopsticks, and why you drive on a particular side of the road are examples of what's been covered)
- Midweek Mixed Tape: Listeners are invited to phone in and help O'Connell build the most epic playlist ever.
- The Footie Report: Shane Crawford comes in once a week to discuss the weekend matches and state of the game.
- OTT Radio: Christian and the team would discuss topics requested by the listeners.
- The Missing Link: Once a month on Fridays, the music team picks 6 songs with a connection, and the listeners and presenters have to guess what the link is.
- Two Thumbs Up Friday: The team gives their weekly recommendations of what they're into. (Similar to the Buzz List feature originally on the UK show)
- Anonymous Confessions: On Fridays, Christian reads texts from listeners about things they're confessing to. The team also prints out confessions that Christian reads. Once they're all read, Jack will shred them.
- Snack Genius: The recipes, sent in by listeners, often contain odd combinations of food which go together surprisingly well. This was a short revival of the UK segment, with the following rules: no more than 30 second prep time, unless microwave is involved to melt something, preferably cheese, in which case, then no more than 1 minute.
- The Wonder Year: On Wednesdays, a specific year is discussed by the team—what they were doing back then, some trivia, and then guessing songs from that year based on 1 second of the song. Then listeners get to guess a one second song, sometimes for a prize (a.k.a. The One Second Winner)
- Are You Smarter Than Google...(baby): On Wednesdays, the team proposes questions about things they don't know about (such as 'How does Wi-Fi work?' or 'How a painkiller work?') and request listeners to call in and answer the question according to what they know (whether they are experts or not)
- Mount Rushmore: On Thursdays, the team starts building what they would put on a new Mount Rushmore, and invite listeners. Topics have included what breads would you nominate for Mount Rushmore, or what takeaway foods.
- Wheel of Four Tunes: Also on Fridays, a song is randomly picked from a group of 4, and that song is the theme of the next call-in.
- Songs That Sum Up Your Weekend: On Mondays, the team shares the songs that sum up their weekend, along with why that song is appropriate.
- Do You Own A....: On Tuesdays, Christian puts out 3 items and asks listeners to call in if they own such things, like a home bar or a pinball machine.
- Stand By Your Band: Listeners are challenged to defend a song or a band that they would usually never admit that they love (the "secret songs of shame"). The team also participates.
- Rage Against the Weekend: Listeners are invited to share the rant that you have from something irritating from the weekend, get it out there, so that you can start the week fresh.
- Mashup Monday: Listeners are encouraged to send in mashups of two songs, and they are featured on the show and judged on how good they are.
- Is Your Name Related to Your Business: On Wednesdays, Christian and the team talk to listeners who have stories of Nominative Determinism, such as a gastroenterologist called Dr Butt, or a weatherman with the last name of Rain. This started up again in May 2025
- A to Z of the (item/decade): On Wednesdays, Christian and the team take a consecutive letter of the alphabet and reminiscence about something iconic from the selected decade that starts with that letter (like E: electric typewriters or D: Duran Duran). Listeners are invited to call in with their memories as well. The team went through the 80s, and are going through the 90s starting in January 2022. They're also working through the A to Z of various things weekly, like girls names in songs or street names.
- Funny Business: On Tuesdays, listeners are invited to share businesses that have funny names, like a bakery called "Knead the Dough" or a gardener called "Russell in the Bushes"
- House of Pain: On Thursdays, Christian asks listeners to tell the story of an injury they had in a specific part of the house.
- Isolated Vocal (AKA Naked Vocal): Christian will play an isolated vocal from one of his favourite songs. The music is stripped back from the original recording and only the vocal is heard. He then plays the original song in full.
- You MUST: The team talks about the places that they recommend that you absolutely must try, and invite listeners to give their recommendations as well. This segment started in February 2023 and only occurred a couple of times.
- The Radio Nature Strip: The team tries to help people sell the things that they want to get rid of instead of turning to things like Facebook Marketplace or other avenues, because listeners helping listeners is always a good thing. This feature started in March 2023.
- The Song Detectives: Listeners are invited to leave a voice message if they're trying to remember a song. They can hum it or sing a snippet, it will be played on the show for listeners to help identify the song. This is a very irregular segment that appears from time to time.
- I've Been Everywhere (suburbs): The team is on a mission to speak to someone from each of the 1000+ suburbs of Melbourne. Listeners just call up on Tuesdays and tell one fact about their suburb.
- What The Fact: Listeners are invited to call in on Thursdays to tell the team facts that get judged on a scale of Great/Just All Right/Dull (would kill a conversation, and is greeted by the sound of crickets). This was originally called Killer Facts.
- Make us say WOW: Listeners are invited to call in on Thursdays with a story that will make all 3 presenters (Christian, Jack, and Patrina) say WOW. This feature was retired for a while and returned in February 2024.
- Good Morning Minute: Christian and the team spend one minute wishing as many people as possible a good morning who text in.
- 6-Word Weekend: Send in a summary of your weekend, using only 6 words.
- One-Second Winner/The Golden Year: Originally on Thursdays, Christian plays a one second clip of a song, while Jack & Pats try to guess the answer the fastest. In May 2024 this segment was brought back as The Golden Year, and now appears on Mondays.
- 3-Topic Tuesday/The Big Book of Listeners: Listeners are invited to phone in and share an anecdote relating to one of three topics suggested by O'Connell. Originally it launched as Five Topic Tuesday (for the first *two* years of the show), but has been pared back for better focus, and then was called Three Topic Tuesday through to 2021 and seems to be randomly referred to as this in 2024.
- The A to Z of...: The team resurrected this segment in May 2024 to get through the A to Z of school stuff.
- Your Weakest Claim To Fame: On Wednesdays, Christian asks listeners to share their run-ins with celebrities that are almost not worth mentioning.
- You Know You're An Adult When...: Inspired by when Christian laid down ant traps to fight an infestation in his mailbox. On Thursdays, listeners are invited to call in with those little things that grown-ups derived joy from, that pinnacle of peak adulting.
- Battle of the Decade: 3 songs enter, 1 song leaves. Pats picks a song from the 80s, Christian picks a song from the 90s, Jack picks from the 2000s, and listeners vote on the song they want to hear.
- Knock-Off Friday: Listeners are invited to phone in and share when they're starting their weekend, and what they're going to do. Christian, Pats, and Jack also share what they're doing too.
- Genius of the Week: Listeners are invited to call in to admit the brain-dead things that they did, like walk home from a shop that they drove to (forgetting their car) or drive a long distance to go somewhere but on the wrong day.
- Naked Hour: Every Friday, listeners pick the songs for the final hour of the show. This started as every Thursday from 7-8 am. This was retired with the exit of Jack Post, as he sang the theme song. It has been rebranded as The People's Playlist.
- Songs for...: A new segment where the team picks a type of job, and callers with those jobs can select the songs for the show. This segment started in April 2025, but did not run for very long.
- The Monday Morning Song Title Game: In the first hour of Monday's show, Christian picks a word and the team has to sing a song that contains that word. This segment started in August 2025. (originally called Song from a word). This dropped sometime in late 2025.
- Things that make you go Grrrrr: On Tuesdays, the team and listeners share those little things that push you over the edge. Listeners are encouraged to call in and release the rage before they go to work. This segment started in May 2025. The segment was originally called 'Small Things, Big Rage' and was renamed in September 2025. This segment was dropped sometimes in early 2026.
- Name Game (as in...): Starting in June 2023, on Tuesdays the team asks callers to play a name game. The prompt is "My name is _____ as in..." Listeners don't give their name, but give real world or pop culture clues to their names for the team to guess.
- What's the Year Again: On Tuesday, Christian pits Pats and Rio against each other for guessing the year something came out - a song, a movie, television, etc. This started up in June 2025.
- Lost in Translation: On Wednesdays, Christian challenges the team with foreign translations of movie titles, and they guess what the original title was. This segment started in September 2025.
- Nominative Determinism: On Thursdays, Christian and the team talk to listeners who have stories of Nominative Determinism, such as a gastroenterologist called Dr Butt, or a weatherman with the last name of Rain. Originally this segment was called "Is Your Name Related To Your Business" when it started in the early days of the show. This started up again in May 2025.

== Awards ==
=== Sony Radio Academy ===
Year	Award	Entry	Result
2003	Best UK Breakfast Show of the Year	The Christian O'Connell Breakfast Show	Gold
2004	UK DJ of the Year	Christian O'Connell	Gold
2005	Entertainment Award	The Christian O'Connell Breakfast Show	Gold
2005	National Breakfast Show of the Year	The Christian O'Connell Breakfast Show	Gold
2005	Best Competition	The Christian O'Connell Breakfast Show	Gold
2006	Sports show	Fighting Talk	Gold
2007	Best Competition	Who's Calling Christian?	Gold
2010	Best Competition	Who's Calling Christian	Gold
2013	Music Radio Personality of the Year	Christian O'Connell	Gold
2013	Best Use of Branded Content	The Christian O'Connell Breakfast Show	Gold
2014	Best Use of Branded Content	The Christian O'Connell Breakfast Show	Gold

=== Other Awards ===
- 2011 The Arqiva/Triple A Media Commercial Radio National Breakfast Show of the Year
- 2013 Commercial Radio Roll of Honour Award 2013 Celebrating 40 years of commercial radio. Award for one of the industry’s most significant talents
- 2014 Youngest Ever DJ Inducted into the UK Radio Academy Hall of Fame
- 2014 Arqiva Commercial Radio Awards National Presenter of The Year
- 2014 Arqiva Commercial Radio Awards Gold Winner – Best UK National Breakfast show of The Year
- 2014 Arqiva Commercial Radio Awards Gold Winner – Best Feature Award the 40 List
- 2014 Arqiva Commercial Radio Awards Gold Special Achievement Award
- 2015 Red Bull Soapbox Challenge World Champions
- 2016 Arqiva Commercial Radio Awards Gold Winner – Best UK National Breakfast Show
- 2017 ARIAS Gold Winner – Best Music Presenter (Breakfast)
- 2017 ARIAS Gold Winner – Best Branded Content or Partnership (Wickes)
