= Gold 1323 =

Gold 1323 (5DN)
- Adelaide, South Australia; Australia
- Broadcast area: Adelaide
- Frequencies: 1323 kHz AM and DAB+

Programming
- Language: English
- Format: Oldies (until 11 December 2026); Adult contemporary (from 12 December 2026)
- Network: Gold Network
- Affiliations: Macquarie Radio Network (1938–1990)

Ownership
- Owner: ARN Media; (Southern State Broadcasters Pty Ltd)
- Sister stations: Gold Adelaide; KIIS 102.3

History
- First air date: 24 February 1925; 101 years ago
- Former call signs: 5DDN (1990–1993)
- Former names: Radio 102FM (1990–1993); SEN SA (2005); Cruise 1323 (2005–2026)
- Former frequencies: 970 kHz (1925-1978); 972 kHz AM (1978-1990); 102.3 MHz FM (1990–1993)

Technical information
- Licensing authority: Australian Communications and Media Authority
- Power: 2,000 watts
- Transmitter coordinates: 34°54′26″S 138°35′35″E
- Repeaters: 94.7 MHz, Angaston (100 watts)

Links
- Public licence information: Profile
- Webcast: Webcast
- Website: Official website

Gold 1323 (call sign 5DN) is one of Adelaide's longest running radio stations. In its 80+ years it has changed considerably. It was the first commercial station to begin broadcasting in South Australia.

== History ==
Radio 5DN began operating as an experimental station in 1924 on a wavelength of about 200 metres (1500 kHz), with official services beginning on 24 February 1925. It began as the hobby of businessman and industrialist Ernest James Hume, a brother of Walter Reginald Hume, but soon grew to absorb the time and energy of the Hume family.

Hume bought his transmitter and some other equipment from radio pioneer Lance C. Jones, who ran station 5BQ in Westbourne Park. The purchase included the original call sign: "5Don N", which had been allocated to Jones in 1923. The origin of that call sign has been lost in the mists of time, but it may be the result of an early spelling alphabet (A for Arthur, C for Charlie, D for Don, etc.).

The transmitter and studios were set up in the Hume family mansion, Peltonga, on Park Terrace (now Greenhill Road), in the suburb of Parkside. Hume installed landlines from the Elder Conservatorium and the University of Adelaide, allowing live broadcasts of concerts and lectures.

The original voice of 5DN was E.J. Hume's wife Stella. As well as being an announcer, she also acted as program organiser, studio director, technical operator, pianist and producer. Their eldest son, Ernest Jeremy Hume took over as technical operator from Jones.

Initially, 5DN broadcast only a few hours a day, three days a week, but as the number of listeners grew, broadcasting hours were extended until it became a full-time 24 hours a day radio station. By 1928, transmissions from 5DN were accessed in almost every country.

5DN was one of the original members of the Macquarie Broadcasting Network, which provided programming and advertising sales services to its stations. Among the Macquarie stars to feature on 5DN in the early years were Australia's first real radio "star", Jack Davey, and Roy Rene and his character "Mo", after whom Australia's entertainment awards, the Mo Awards, are named.

Big local names of 5DN in the 40s and 50s included long time Breakfast announcer, Mel Cameron, Vic Braham, Ron Sullivan, Phyllis Pullman, Alan Sanders and Barry Hall. Cameron was on the air at 5DN for more than 35 years, making him one of South Australia's best known radio voices.

One of the station's most popular locally produced programs of the late 1940s and 50s was "Under the Stars", written for 20 years by 5DN's chief scriptwriter, Merv Hill. He also single-handedly wrote the scripts for "Radio Canteen". Begun as an experiment in Saturday night live entertainment, the show ran for 13 years, featuring virtually every leading entertainer in South Australia.

Other shows heard on 5DN around the same time included "Quiz Kids", the "Cashmere Bouquet Show", "Doctor Mac" and "Music While You Work", many of them originating from the Macquarie Network production studios in Sydney.

During the late 30s 5DN kept its listeners informed, with regular news broadcasts, establishing South Australia's first independent radio news service in 1938. It continued its news service during the war years, and in the 1950s continued its own local news service, with the backing of Macquarie National News, which became the largest radio news network in Australia.

Sport has also played a large part in 5DN's programming. The station became the first in South Australia to introduce "ball by ball" commentaries on cricket, in 1930. The station also covered motor racing in the 1930s, with live broadcasts from the Lobethal Circuit. In later years, football commentary, horse and greyhound racing were also major elements of 5DN's sports coverage.

In 1969, 5DN introduced Adelaide's first Open Line talkback programme, beginning the move to the News/Talk format that saw the station dominate the ratings in the 1970s and 80s. The pioneer of the format on 5DN was the Reverend Neil Adcock, on his daytime talkback show.

Jeremy Cordeaux joined the station in 1976 to host the daytime show, with Neil Adcock moving to a Sunday night spot. But for a long time 5DN's ratings record was held by late night Open Line host, Roger Mac. His ratings often exceeded the figures other stations recorded for their prime time programs.

In 1983/84 5DN scratched the races and broadcasts were moved to Beautiful Music station FIVEaa which had been bought by the TAB for this purpose.

Led by Paul Linkson as General Manager other broadcasters who featured on 5DN 972 from 1980 include Leigh Hatcher, Vincent Smith, Murray Nicoll, Gary Rivett, Kevin Crease, Ken Dickin, Judith Barr, Ken Cunningham, Gary Bau, David Hookes, Trevor Ford, Bob Byrne, Noel Yeates, Geoff Jay, Alex Zastera, Gerard Stone, Dave Waterman, Joan Hanger, Ray Fewings, Andrew Pearce, Chris Glenn, Dom Rinaldo, Murray "Buzzard" Olds, Terry Clark, Nan Witcomb and Jeff Medwell. Australia Overnight emanated from 2GB in Sydney and was hosted by Owen Delaney (M-F) and Les Solomon at weekends.

Until the sale of the Macquarie Radio Network by Warwick Fairfax and the station's affiliation with 2UE, Macquarie National News – 2GB, 3AW, 4BH, 5DN and 6PR – was provided by Colin Tyrus (News Director), Murray Olds (News Director and later breakfast personality), Mark Smith (News Director), Kevin Donnellan, Verity Webb, Simon Francis, Graham Warburton, Neil Wiese, Tim Sauer, Jim Snedden, Eric Wisgard, Craig Middleton, Tracey Cain, Shaun Fewings, Shane Sody, Graham Cairns, Anne Fulwood, Amanda Bachmann, Michelle Weidenhofer, Alan Murrell, Heidi Koch, Amanda Buchanan and Narelle Hill.

Sport was provided by Kim Anderson and Jonathan Rivett.

5DN's 972AM frequency is today utilised by ABC NewsRadio.

=== The move to FM ===
In 1990, 5DN moved to FM and changed its on-air identity to Radio 102 FM. The high rating News/Talk/Sport format was dropped, staff were made redundant and the station changed to a Classic Hits music format managed and programmed by the same people who had overseen 5DN.

'Radio 102FM – Sounds Like Adelaide to Me' was not a success in Adelaide. Poor ratings led the station change its position to compete with SAFM, the market dominator at the time. The station then changed to an adult rock format in early 1992 and adopted the on air identifier X102.

X102 failed to derail the dominant SAFM and continued to operate at a financial loss. Later 1323 5AD became available for sale and was purchased by Montclair Investments. The owners of Montclair, which included former 5DN personality and First Radio Limited investor Jeremy Cordeaux and former 5DN Station Manager Sue Fraser, subsequently made an offer to the by now defeated owners of the 102.3 FM frequency. The transaction proceeded and 5AD was immediately simulcast on the FM frequency from December 1992. It proved to be an instant success in both ratings and advertising terms with the station continuing to simulcast on the AM frequency.

5AD dominated the ratings during the simulcast period but was eventually instructed to end the simulcast by the regulatory authorities. This left the owners with a 'spare' commercial licence on the AM band but, as the 5AD brand name had moved to FM, the AM station was without an identity. So Radio 1323 was launched with a format featuring old 5DN personalities and a mixture of talk and Easy Listening music in July 1993.

Radio 1323 was then subsequently rebranded as 5DN and returned to a mostly talk format. Behind the scenes, there was only a small number of people technically employed by 5DN with the remainder (management, news, technical, sales) employed by 5ADFM.

=== The SEN experiment ===
The holding company for the two stations was later bought by ARN Media. However the reincarnation failed to recapture the glory days of the late 1970s and 1980s and ARN closed it down in December 2004, leasing the licence to Melbourne based broadcaster SEN.

The radio listener share of 1323 AM dropped from 6.7% in December 2004 to almost Nil in May 2005. SEN encountered financial difficulties, and relinquished control of the licence, handing it back to ARN. After regaining control, ARN began a simulcast of its FM station, now rebranded as Mix 102.3.

=== Cruise begins ===
At 6am on 15 November 2005, the AM frequency was again separated from the FM program and was rebranded as Cruise 1323, playing easy listening music. The first Adelaide ratings survey of 2006 gave Cruise 1323 8th place and a 5.2% share of the total audience. By the first survey of 2007, Cruise had moved to 6th place and 7.8% of the total audience overtaking the National youth station Triple J and commercial FM Rock station Triple M Adelaide. In March 2012 the station joined the Classic Hits Network alongside Gold 101.7 Sydney, Gold 104.3 Melbourne and 4KQ Brisbane.

The Cruise 1323 Line-up from 2010-2023: John Dean - 6:00AM - 10:00AM, Dom Rinaldo - 10:00AM - 1:00PM, Craig Huggins - 1:00PM - 3:00PM, Mark Elliston - 3:00PM - 6:00PM, JAM Nation with Jonesy and Amanda: 6:00PM - 7:00PM.

In 2022, SEN (Sports Entertainment Network), and ARN (Cruise 1323's Owner), announced a partnership where Cruise 1323 would syndicate different SEN programs, such as Sportsday with Malcolm Blight and David Wildy, which is relayed at Drive.

In 2023, mornings announcer Dom Rinaldo and drive announcer Mark Elliston, both were made redundant from Cruise 1323. After these changes, John Dean was the only local presenter, and his show was moved from 6-10AM, to 7AM-12PM.

In February 2025, long time announcer, John Dean, announced he was stepping back from the Breakfast/Mornings slot on Cruise 1323. His departure was due to a broader change in the GOLD Network. Kev Mulcahy was the Breakfast/Morning Fill in until a replacement was announced.

In March 2025, Craig Huggins moved to do the Afternoons on 96FM in Perth.

In April 2025, former afternoons announcer, Craig Huggins, was announced as the next Cruise 1323 Breakfast Host. He departed Melbourne's Gold 104.3 after 34 years. Kev Mulcahy was filling in on Breakfast since John Dean's departure.

On 1 October 2026, Cruise 1323 was rebranded as Gold 1323 when it was officially announced in October 2025. As part of the rebrand, ARN confirmed that Jonesy & Amanda will present National Drive on the station, as well as GOLD Sport on Mondays and Fridays from 6-7PM. Starting from 12 December 2026, the station will join Adult Contemporary to bring it in line with Melbourne's Gold 104.3 and Sydney's Gold 101.7.
