= Fred Botica =

Australian radio personality

Fred Botica (born 20 March 1947) is a retired radio host who co-hosted "Botica's Bunch for Breakfast" with Lisa Shaw on Perth's 96FM.

Botica was born in New Zealand, and began his radio career in December 1969 on Radio Hauraki, to which he returned in 1973 after a couple of years working at Radio 1XX in Whakatāne. In 1976, he again left Radio Hauraki to work at Melbourne's 3KZ, a stint that lasted only 6 months. He returned once again to Radio Hauraki as breakfast presenter and program director, where he remained (apart from a short sojourn at 1ZM) until late 1982. He then began work at 89FM, the first commercial FM radio station in Auckland.

Botica immigrated to Perth from New Zealand in 1986, and started work with Channel 7 Perth as their voiceover artist, and with 96fm as a breakfast radio announcer. During his time at 96fm, he performed the Australia Day skyshow voiceovers. In 1993, 96fm was bought by Village Roadshow and was renamed Triple M. Staff at the station opposed the changes which were to occur with this purchase; as a consequence, Botica along with his sidekick Captain Paul shifted to 94.5 during 1992.

Since then Botica led Mix 94.5's breakfast team to the highest rating in Perth with Botica's Bunch, although in recent years the breakfast slot has been beaten on many occasions by ABC 720's Eoin Cameron. Botica was reputed to command an annual salary of $250,000. In 2014, just prior to his retirement, he moved to co-host the afternoon drive shift on Mix 94.5 with his former breakfast co-host Lisa Shaw.

As part of his image while on Mix 94.5, Botica insisted that he was camera-shy, and in all publicity and advertising for his radio show, his face was always obscured.

In 2019, he came out of retirement and returned to 96FM, reuniting with Shaw on the station's breakfast program, which was again named "Botica's Bunch".

On 11 March 2021, he announced his resumed retirement, with the last "Botica's Bunch" show airing on 12 March 2021. His co-host Lisa Shaw was joined by former Mix 94.5 breakfast host Dean Clairs for a new show, "The Bunch", which started on 15 March 2021.
