= Gold (Australian radio network) =

Australian radio network

Gold Network
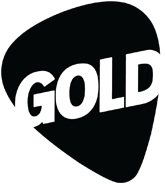
- Country: Australia
- Broadcast area: Sydney (Gold 101.7); Melbourne (Gold 104.3); Brisbane (Gold DAB+ Brisbane); Adelaide (Gold 1323 / Gold DAB+ Adelaide); Perth (Gold 96FM); Canberra (Mix 106.3)
- Headquarters: North Sydney, New South Wales

Programming
- Language: English
- Format: Oldies, Adult contemporary, classic hits

Ownership
- Owner: ARN

History
- Launch date: 2005
- Former names: Classic Hits Network (2005–2017); Pure Gold Network (2017–2025)

The Gold Network (formerly Pure Gold Network) is a network of radio stations owned and operated by ARN. Before the sale of its broadcasting licence, 4KQ was a part of the Gold Network.

== Current Stations ==
As of 19 January 2026, the Gold Network consists of five radio stations.

Gold station	Location	Music format
Gold 1323	Adelaide	Classic hits (until 11 December 2026); Adult contemporary (from 12 December 2026)
Gold 96FM	Perth	Adult contemporary
Gold 104.3	Melbourne	Adult contemporary
Gold 101.7	Sydney	Adult contemporary
Mix 106.3	Canberra	Adult contemporary

== Former Stations ==
The Gold Network consists of one former radio station.

Gold station	Location	Music format	Notes
4KQ	Brisbane	Oldies	Sold to SEN

== Network shows ==
- The Christian O'Connell Show (airs on Gold 80s in Perth) (from Gold 104.3 Melbourne)
- Dave Higgins** (from Gold 104.3 Melbourne)
- Toni Tenaglia** (from Gold 104.3 Melbourne)
- GOLD Sport with Eddie McGuire & Abbey Gelmi^ (from Gold 104.3 Melbourne)
- Jonesy & Amanda (from Gold 101.7 Sydney)
- This Week In Music (from Gold 101.7 Sydney)

*Sydney and Melbourne
**Except Adelaide
^Except Perth

== Local shows ==
Gold 1323 - Adelaide

- Craig Huggins
- Steve 'Bilko' Bilokin

Gold 96FM - Perth

- Lisa and Russell
- Macca

== Digital radio ==
The Gold Network simulcasts each station in the network on Digital Radio in their local markets. Prior to the merger of iHeartRadio they also broadcast Gold 80's, featuring 1980s music, Gold 90's, was featured 1990s music and now moved to KIIS Network as KIIS 90's, and, in a joint venture with the KIIS Network, the adult contemporary-formatted Chemist Warehouse Remix.

Gold DAB+ launched in Adelaide and Brisbane on 19 January 2026.

=== Digital-only stations ===
Station	Music format(s)	Location
Gold Adelaide (rebrand as Gold 60s & 70s on 12 December 2026)	Adult contemporary (until 11 December 2026); Classic hits (From 12 December 2026)	Adelaide Only
Gold Brisbane	Adult contemporary	Brisbane Only
Gold 80s	1980s music	Sydney, Melbourne, Brisbane, Adelaide and Perth
