= Jonesy & Amanda =

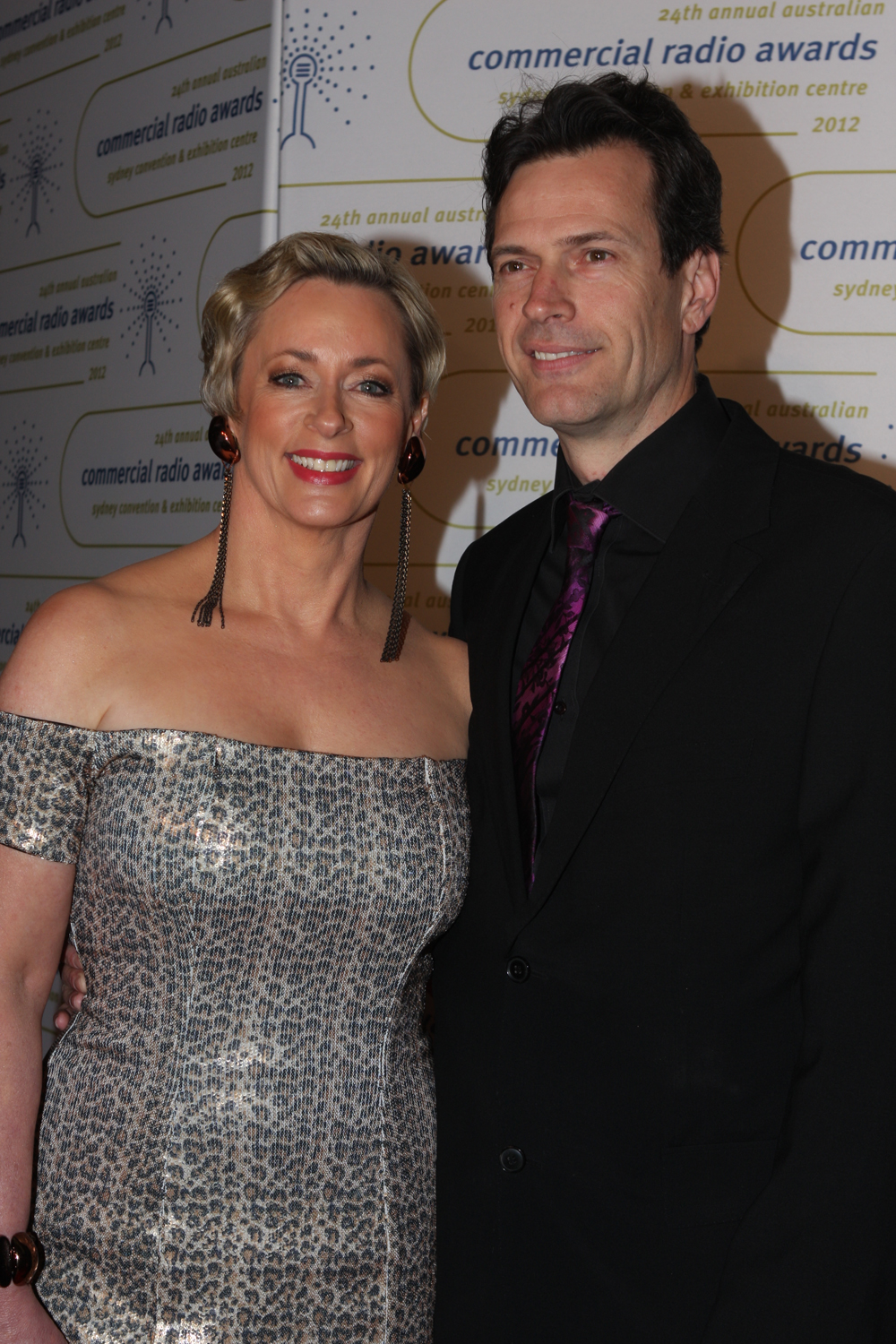
- Amanda Keller & Brendan Jones in 2012
- Genre: Talk and Music
- Running time: Weekdays 3pm–6pm
- Country of origin: Australia
- Language: English
- Home station: Gold 101.7
- Syndicates: Gold Network
- Starring: Brendan Jones; Amanda Keller
- Produced by: Jacinda Gugliemino (Show Director); Joanne Ockwell (Executive Producer); Megan Smith (Senior Producer); Jenna Benson (Senior Digital Content Producer); Ryan Atkins (Studio Producer); Wayne Fox (Image Producer); Jeff Nielsen (Image Producer)
- Original release: 17 January 2005 – present
- Website: Jonesy & Amanda
- Podcast: JAM Nation with Jonesy & Amanda

Jonesy & Amanda is an Australian radio show hosted by Brendan Jones and Amanda Keller.

The program airs weekdays on the Gold Network from 3:00 PM to 6:00 PM.

Since the show's debut in 2005, Jonesy & Amanda have garnered a loyal audience and received several industry awards, reflecting their prominence in Australian radio.

Jonesy & Amanda have conducted interviews with several Australian Prime Ministers, set a Guinness World Record by broadcasting their show from underwater for over three hours, and even drank each other's blood.

== History ==
Before working at Gold 101.7, Jones and Keller both previously worked at Triple M Sydney, with Jones on the drive shift and Keller on the breakfast shift with Andrew Denton. During a week when Jones filled in for Denton on the breakfast show, he noted strong on-air chemistry with Keller.

In 2003, Jones joined Gold 101.7 to host its breakfast program. At the time, the station faced challenges in building an audience, and Jones described this period as one of the most difficult of his career. In 2004, Jones suggested to Gold 101.7's management that hiring Keller would improve the show's performance, reportedly stating, "If we get her, we will go #1 next year, and if we don't, I will leave."

Initially, Keller was hesitant to commit to full-time breakfast radio due to family responsibilities and her work on the ABC TV program Mondo Thingo. However, after Mondo Thingo was not renewed, she accepted the breakfast co-host role at Gold 101.7.

In 2005, Jonesy & Amanda became the top-rated FM breakfast radio show in the seventh ratings survey of the year, achieving an 8.8% share. In the following survey, Gold 101.7 was ranked the number one FM station overall, with a 9.5% share.

In June 2020, JAM Nation with Jonesy & Amanda launched across the Gold Network, airing weeknights from 6pm to 7pm. The program featured highlights from their popular Breakfast show. It concluded in December 2025 ahead of their transition to a new live Drive show beginning in January 2026.

In August 2025, Jonesy & Amanda announced that their show will move from the Breakfast to the Drive slot in 2026. It was announced that The Christian O'Connell Show will be networked across both Gold 101.7 and Gold 104.3, as well as on DAB+ in Brisbane, Adelaide and Perth.

== Regular segments ==
=== Magnificent Seven ===
The show begins with a quiz segment where callers answer a series of seven questions in a relay format. If a caller answers incorrectly, the next caller takes over from the same question. The questions often relate to current events, and the caller who answers the seventh and final question correctly wins a prize.

=== Instagrand ===
This trivia-based segment invites callers to answer ten questions correctly to win a cash prize of $1,000. Participants who succeed have the option to risk their winnings on a double or nothing bonus question.

=== Pub Test ===
The segment involves discussing a recent event, news story, or social concept, with callers invited to share their opinions on whether it "passes the Pub Test."

=== TikTok Tucker ===
Each Thursday, Jonesy and Amanda try out a viral recipe from TikTok, recreating it live on the show. The hosts often provide humorous commentary, with many of the recipes eliciting mixed reactions, sometimes being deemed unappetizing.

=== Fight for Your Flashback ===
On Fridays, Jonesy and Amanda receive a theme from management and each selects a classic song that aligns with it. These rarely-played tracks are then pitted against each other, with listeners voting on which song should be played.

=== Jalmanac ===
The segment features trivia or interesting facts about a song or band, which the hosts discuss before playing the corresponding song.

=== The Tribal Drum ===
This segment invites callers to share personal stories and experiences based on a specific topic introduced by the hosts.

Keller described the concept in an interview with Woman's Day, stating, “Part of our job is to be what we call a tribal drum: to have people talk about what they are going through and what we are all going through and how we experience the world."

=== Gets My Goolies ===
Listeners are invited to share personal grievances or pet peeves. Participants can submit their "goolies" through the iHeartRadio app. The hosts present the best "goolies" at the end of the show, and each year, the most compelling submission is awarded a significant prize, such as $20,000 in cash.

=== Mystery Footy Tipper ===
A weekly segment during the NRL season featuring a guest, often a celebrity or sports figure, who predicts the results of upcoming National Rugby League (NRL) games.

In 2024, the segment gained international attention after Senior Producer Megan Smith mistakenly texted Academy Award-nominated actress Rachel Griffiths while attempting to book former rugby league player and sports commentator Paul "Fatty" Vautin.

Smith's initial text was professional, asking "Paul" to appear as the "Mystery Footy Tipper". When the recipient replied, “Also, Megan, it’s not Paul,” Smith assumed Vautin was offended by her use of his first name rather than his nickname, "Fatty."

In response, Smith apologized and addressed the recipient as "Fatty."

Griffiths responded with, “WTF? Your job is to call people fatty?” prompting Smith to realize her mistake. The blunder was shared widely on social media, with clips from Jonesy & Amanda attracting international media attention.

=== Man of the Match ===
At the end of the show, the favourite call, email, or social media comment of the day wins the "Man of the Match" title, along with a prize.

== Special events ==
=== World record attempts ===
In 2010, Jonesy & Amanda set a Guinness World Record for the 'Longest underwater broadcast,' achieved by broadcasting their breakfast show for over three hours underwater at 3.8 meters from inside the Great Barrier Reef Habitat at the Sydney Aquarium, surrounded by sharks. This segment won an Australian Commercial Radio Award for Best Sales Promotion in 2011.

In 2019, Jonesy & Amanda set a Guinness World Record for the 'Largest dim sum (yum cha) dinner.' This was achieved during the 2019 Sydney Lunar Festival. Approximately 3,100 individual pieces of dim sum were cooked by the Let's Do Yum Cha food truck and were served to 764 people. This segment won an Australian Commercial Radio Award for Best Sales Promotion in 2019.

=== Other ===
On 23 November 2023, Jonesy & Amanda hosted An Evening with Jonesy & Amanda at the Sydney Coliseum Theatre. This 90-minute live show emulated their radio program's format, featuring signature segments like "Magnificent Seven," "TikTok Tucker," and "Gets My Goolies." The event celebrated their 18-year partnership and included a live performance by Marcia Hines.

In March 2024, as they prepared to move to new studios in North Sydney after over 18 years at Macquarie Park, Jonesy & Amanda organised the "JAM-Tiques Roadshow". This live on-air event auctioned unique memorabilia from their tenure, with all proceeds donated to the Sydney Children’s Hospital.

== Ratings and reception ==
The show has consistently achieved strong ratings, often ranking among Sydney's top breakfast programs.

The highest rating ever recorded for Jonesy & Amanda was in the fourth radio ratings survey of 2014, where the show achieved a rating of 11.5%.

In the seventh radio ratings survey of 2024, Jonesy & Amanda achieved a share of 11.3%, their second highest ratings on record.

== Team ==
=== Current ===
Name	Position	Start
Jacinda Gugliemino	Show Director	2023
Joanne Ockwell	Executive Producer	2024
Megan Smith	Senior Producer	2023
Jenna Benson (Digital Jenna)	Senior Digital Content Producer	2019
Ryan Atkins (Gen Y Ry)	Studio Producer	2022
Wayne Fox	Image Producer	2017
Jeff Nielsen	Image Producer	2018

=== Former ===
Name	Position	Start	End
Thomas Gosby (New Boy Tom)	Studio Producer	2025	2025
Monica Reid	Producer	2023	2024
Emily Waterson	Producer	2023	2024
Millie Starling	Executive Producer	2018	2024
Tyran Stig	Senior Producer	2023	2023
Mariam Belle	Content Producer	2022	2023
Kate Meade	Senior Producer	2022	2022
Anna Crotti	Senior Producer	2019	2022
Natasha Fedele	Multimedia and Content Producer	2018	2022
Jimmy Manning	Studio Producer	2017	2022
Laura Bouchet	Executive Producer	2007	2019
Ben Latimer	Executive Producer	2007	2012

== Awards ==
=== Australian Commercial Radio Awards ===
Jonesy & Amanda have been recognized at the Australian Commercial Radio Awards (ACRAs) with multiple accolades, including winning the Best On-Air Team award five times (2012, 2014, 2019, 2023, and 2024).

Amongst the team, Senior Digital Content Producer Jenna Benson has received notable recognition, winning five ACRAs, the most of any individual team member.

Year	Nominee / work	Award	Result
2011	Jonesy & Amanda's Underwater Broadcast	Best Sales Promotion	Won
2012	Jonesy & Amanda	Best On-Air Team	Won
2013	Charlie Fox	Best Program Director	Won
2014	Jonesy & Amanda	Best On-Air Team	Won
2014	Laura Viglino	Best Show Producer	Won
2015	Laura Viglino	Best Show Producer	Won
2019	Jeff Nielsen	Best Achievement in Production	Won
2019	Jonesy & Amanda	Best On-Air Team	Won
2019	Jonesy & Amanda's Sydney Lunar Festival World Record Yum Cha	Best Sales Promotion	Won
2020/2021	Jonesy & Amanda's Holiday Book Club	Best Radio Show Podcast	Won
2020/2021	Jenna Benson	Best Newcomer Off-Air	Won
2022	Jonesy & Amanda's Time Travellers Podcast	Best Radio Show Podcast	Won
2022	Mike Byrne	Best Program Director	Won
2023	Jonesy & Amanda	Best On-Air Team	Won
2023	Annette George	Promotions Director of the Year	Won
2024	Jonesy & Amanda	Best On-Air Team	Won
2024	Jenna Benson, Brendan Jones, Amanda Keller	Digital Team of the Year	Won
2024	Jenna Benson	Best Digital Content Creator	Won
