= Nan Witcomb =

Australian poet (1928–2023)

- Born: 27 May 1928; Adelaide, South Australia, Australia
- Died: 17 November 2023 (aged 95); Brighton, South Australia, Australia
- Occupations: Poet; broadcaster; author; scriptwriter; composer; raconteur
- Writing career
- Genre: Poetry
- Website: users.senet.com.au/~nanushka

Nancy Witcomb (27 May 1928 – 17 November 2023) was an Australian poet. She was best known around the world for her simple poems published over three decades from the 1970s until the 1990s as The Thoughts of Nanushka, Nanushka being her pseudonym.

In her home town of Adelaide, South Australia, she was also known as a broadcaster, author, scriptwriter and raconteur and made appearances on national television. Witcomb as a scriptwriter wrote for the satirical television series The Mavis Bramston Show, as well as several revues and plays. Witcomb was also a composer who wrote lyrics for her friend Lorrae Desmond for her ABC television variety show.

== Biography ==
=== Early life and radio broadcasting ===
Witcomb attended several public and private schools, before leaving at 15 to work at the Bank of Adelaide and at 18 trained as a nurse at the Adelaide Children's Hospital, she joined Australian National Airlines (ANA) (later Ansett Australia) as a hostess in 1950, launching a 23-year career that she later documented in her memoir of the early days of hostessing Up Here and Down There.

In the 1970s, she hosted talk-back radio on Adelaide AM station 5DN Cruise 1323 with co-host Ken Dickin.

== Publishing ==
=== Poetry and books ===
Her poem, "To Mourn Too Long for Those We Love" was read at the funeral of INXS lead singer, Michael Hutchence.

Witcomb died in a nursing home in Brighton, South Australia on 17 November 2023, at the age of 95.

First published by herself, Witcomb's "Thoughts" appeared in the 1970s as a single volume, The Thoughts of Nanushka. A further volume, The Thoughts of Nanushka Vols VII–XII appeared in the 1980s and a later volume The Thoughts of Nanushka Vols XIII–XVIII completed the main three volume set. The same poems have appeared in smaller collections in both hard and paperback, sometimes with different titles, e.g. "Believe in the Dream". Witcomb wrote a book on nostalgia title I nMy Day, or, You And Me Before TV" in 1996

== Bibliography ==
- Nanushka's Love Poems: To Someone I Love, Pan, 1992, ISBN 9780330273244
- Believe in the Dream: A Selection of Poems from Nanushka, Volumes 1–18, Witcomb, Nan, 1999, ISBN 9780949332141
- In My Day, or, You And Me Before TV (1996)

== Sources ==
- Nan Witcomb Up Here and Down There, ISBN 094933202X
