= KIIS 97.3 =

Commercial radio station in Brisbane, Queensland, Australia

Brisbane, Queensland; Australia
- Broadcast area: Brisbane; Logan; Gold Coast; Ipswich
- Frequencies: 97.3 MHz FM and DAB+
- Branding: KIIS 97.3

Programming
- Language: English
- Format: Top 40 (CHR)
- Affiliations: KIIS Network

Ownership
- Owner: ARN (50%) Nova Entertainment (50%); (Brisbane FM Radio Pty Ltd)

History
- First air date: 26 September 2001
- Former names: 97.3FM (2001–2022)
- Call sign meaning: 4 for Queensland plus B for Brisbane, FM

Technical information
- Licensing authority: ACMA
- ERP: 12,000 watt
- HAAT: 299 m
- Transmitter coordinates: 27°27′52″S 152°56′47″E

Links
- Public licence information: Profile
- Website: kiis973.com.au

KIIS 97.3 (call sign: 4BFM) is a commercial FM radio station in Brisbane, Australia. It is a 50/50 joint venture between Nova Entertainment and ARN.

== History ==
KIIS 97.3 plays current chart hits and a variety of 2010s (and some 2000s) music (Contemporary hit radio), primarily targeted at the 25–54 age group, the group most valued by advertisers. Brisbane's 97.3 FM is part of the KIIS Network with sister stations in other major Australian cities KIIS 106.5 Sydney, KIIS 101.1 Melbourne, Mix 102.3 Adelaide, 96FM Perth. In January 2015, 97.3 rebranded with a new logo, along with sister stations in Sydney, Melbourne, Adelaide, and Perth.

The addition of DAB AAC+ Digital Radio to Brisbane means that 97.3 FM and its co-owned Classic Hits 4KQ will both be available on the digital format. The additional channel to be provided by 97.3 is called "The Edge Digital", a digital format revamp of the ARN-owned Edge 96.1 in Western Sydney.

The station's headquarters in Brisbane is located in the inner-western suburb of Milton, after ARN relocated the 97.3FM and 4KQ stations from Stones Corner in May 2019.

Launched as 97.3fm, the station was rebranded as KIIS 97.3 on 24 January 2022. The initial logo was similar to the KIIS logo used in Sydney and Melbourne, however with the 97.3 frequency larger than the KIIS text. It has also retained its Hot AC music format. By December 2022, the logo was changed to the same design used by KIIS in Sydney and Melbourne.

In March 2024, ARN announced changes to its daytime programming with Gordie Waters being networked from Sydney into KIIS 101.1 in Melbourne and in Brisbane from April. Jess Miller was the previous workday announcer and left the station on the 5 April.

In late November 2024, Corey Oates was announced as the third co-host of the breakfast show. The show was renamed Robin and Kip, now with Corey Oates in the Morning.

In October 2025, ARN announced that Robin, Kip & Corey Oates would cease at the end of the year. Craig Low will take over as the breakfast announcer for 2026, with the show to be called Breakfast with Lowie. In December 2025, following backlash and a survey ARN has confirmed that Robin, Kip & Corey Oates would continue to host breakfast. Craig Low who was going to replace them was moved to a national show at night broadcasting between 9pm - 12am.
