= CADA =

Australian music radio station

- Wentworth Falls, New South Wales, Australia; Australia
- Broadcast area: Katoomba RA1
- Frequency: 96.1 MHz FM

Programming
- Language: English
- Format: Rhythmic CHR; Urban contemporary

Ownership
- Owner: ARN Media; (Blue Mountains Broadcasters Pty Ltd)
- Sister stations: Gold 101.7; KIIS 106.5

History
- First air date: 7 September 1935
- Former call signs: 2KA (1935–1990); OneFM/96.1FM (1990–2002); The Edge 96.ONE (2002–2022)
- Former frequencies: 783 / 1476 kHz AM (1978–1992); 780 kHz AM (1937–1978); 1480 kHz AM (1978); 1160 kHz AM (1935–1937)
- Call sign meaning: 2 – New South Wales; ONE FM

Technical information
- ERP: 5 kW
- Transmitter coordinates: 33°43′23″S 150°23′6″E

Links
- Website: www.cada.com.au

CADA (call sign: 2ONE) is a music radio station based in outer Sydney, Australia, but licensed to Katoomba. It is operated by ARN Media.

== History ==
CADA, formerly known as The Edge, is an Australian radio station licensed to Katoomba, New South Wales, and serving the Blue Mountains area of western Sydney. The radio station was launched on 7 September 1935, as 2KA.

In December 1937, 2KA moved from 1160 to 780 kHz. A repeater station on 1480 kHz was added in 1978. From November 1978, the station transmitted on 783 kHz on the AM band, with a translator station on 1476 kHz at Emu Plains.

Before the station launched its Emu Plains based translator in the late 1970s, it was exclusively a Blue Mountains based licence. The new frequency, 1476 kHz, enabled programmers to extend the audience reach to Penrith, and draw revenue from businesses in the area. To combat the potential damage to their Sydney audiences at the time, a number of Sydney radio stations bought the licence and experimented with various automated technologies, none of which were seriously designed to draw mass audiences.

Australian television personality Mike Walsh bought the licence in 1983 from The Lamb Family (2UE) and worked to advance his vision of developing a successful business model and innovative entertainment product. The station, which had been broadcasting from a studio in Borec House, at the corner of Station Street and Henry Street in Penrith, developed a new studio at the intersection of Henry and Lawson Streets. It adjoined a cinema complex, which was also owned by Walsh.

=== The Edge 96.ONE ===
On 26 October 1990 at 13:00 hrs., it converted to the FM band and became One FM, and later 96.1FM. The station had paid just $46,000 to convert to the FM band, which was considered a bargain, noting it covered a considerable area of Sydney, and the record amounts of money being paid by other AM stations to convert to FM. In order to be granted the licence the owners, 'Hayden Nepean Broadcasting', had to agree to comply with regulations regarding local content and the stations overall focus on the local community. The station played Top 40 mainstream CHR (1990–1997, 1999–2005) and Alternative Rock (1998) before its Dance, Hip Hop and R'n'B phase (2006–2022).

In 1997 the station was sold by Mike Walsh to Australian Radio Network, which currently owns three Sydney radio stations: CADA, Gold 101.7 and KIIS 106.5.

Following ARN's purchase, the One FM studio in Penrith was colocated to Seven Hills with WSFM 101.7. In 2002 The Edge moved to North Ryde, as did WSFM 101.7.

Although licensed to Katoomba/Blue Mountains/Penrith, its signal, at 5 kW located at Wentworth Falls, is enough to cover most of the Sydney basin subject to local interference. It can also be heard in some parts of Canberra, Wollongong, Newcastle and Bathurst. One FM was taken to court in the 1990s for excessive coverage overspill by 2Day FM and Triple M Sydney. They lost, and One FM was able to continue broadcasting.

AC Nielsen chose not to include its figures in the Sydney Nielsen polls, with its figures forming part of the 'Other' stations in the survey. Because the station is not licensed to serve the Sydney market, ARN can own it as well as the Sydney licensed WSFM 101.7 and KIIS 106.5.

In January 2006, ARN decided to launch the first pure urban format radio station in the country, on The Edge. The format change was due to the overwhelming response to the nightly urban count down, "K-Sera & The Dirty Dozen", with K-Sera and Kris Fade that culminated in being awarded Best Radio Show Australia and New Zealand at the 2006 Urban Music Awards. To coincide with the new look, The Edge unveiled a new brand and logo to emphasise its place as the Hip Hop and R'n'B radio station. The Edge evolved into a more contemporary hits format with an urban influence, ARN have chosen to capitalise on the established ‘K-Sera’ brand, and continue to service the confirmed urban audience in Australia on a national level by launching KseraRadio.com, streaming on-line now.

In 2009, The Edge launched a sister station of the same format on DAB+ in Adelaide, Brisbane, Melbourne and Sydney under the name of ''Edge Digital''. The station is a music format based on The Edge 96.One, though not a direct simulcast of that station, but shares resources, including logo and promotions. Edge Digital is not available on Metro FM radio.

In April 2011, The Edge Breakfast welcomed back former announcers Mike E and Emma Chow

In August 2013, The Edge rebranded and presented their new music position. While the previous tagline of "Live Sexy" described the lifestyle associated with The Edge, the new philosophy of "Hits That Move You" was believed to direct listeners to what they will hear on the station. "The Edge is unique in Australian radio as it is the only commercial station running an Urban format. 'Hits that move you' expresses our musical edge and better allows urban music fans to find us." The changes followed an online poll where listeners were asked to choose a format. They wanted a hybrid of urban, pop, dance and R'n'B. This tag line would be short lived and broaden to not just 'hits' but all forms of urban 'beats'.

The Edge also hosted the famous Club Edge show playing Saturday evenings with resident DJs such as Nino Brown at night.

In March 2014, The Edge revealed an innovative new listener-driven chart from iHeartRadio.

In December 2021, ARN announced that Mike E and Emma from ‘The Edge’s Mike E & Emma’ had decided to leave The Edge, having wrapped their final breakfast show on 3 December 2021. The duo had entertained audiences in Western Sydney and beyond since 2011.

On 31 March 2022 at 16:00 hrs, The Edge 96.ONE was rebranded and switched over to the CADA format after almost 20 years.

=== CADA ===
On 31 March 2022, The Edge 96.ONE relaunched as CADA, Australia’s home of Hip Hop and R'n'B. "Unique, inclusive and exclusive content will all be part of the experience." CADA will provide a new avenue for both local and international Hip Hop and R'n'B artists to showcase their music on a station with national multi-platform reach.

In April 2025, Jake Powell, CADA's Content and Music Director, took over CADA Breakfast from 6am-10am.. With K-Sera on Drive from 3pm-5pm and The Dirty Dozen 5pm-7pm, CADA held the #1 position in Sydney overall, in Breakfast and Drive.

Later in April 2025 it was revealed that the host of Weekdays with Thy was not a real person, but was AI generated. Despite this, 'Weekdays with Thy' was the #1 Mornings and Afternoons announcer in Sydney.

== Studios ==
- Medlow Bath, Katoomba: Pre-1976
- Penrith: Borec House Cnr Station & Henry St (1976–1987)
- Penrith: Cnr Henry & Lawson St (1987–1997)
- Seven Hills Leabons Lane (1997–2002)
- North Ryde: Byfield Street (2002–2024)
- North Sydney: Mount Street/The Coca Cola Building (2024-Present)
