= 4KQ =

Brisbane, Queensland; Australia
- Broadcast area: Brisbane, Gold Coast, Ipswich, Sunshine Coast
- Frequencies: 693 kHz AM and DAB+
- Branding: SENQ 693

Programming
- Language: English
- Format: Sporting coverage and talkback

Ownership
- Owner: Sports Entertainment Network

History
- First air date: 7 May 1947; 78 years ago
- Former frequencies: 690 kHz (1948–1978); 650 kHz (1947–1948)

Technical information
- Power: 10,000 watts day/5,000 watts night
- Transmitter coordinates: 27°22′47″S 153°14′6″E

Links
- Website: www.sen.com.au/qld/

4KQ is a commercial radio station in Brisbane, Australia owned by Sports Entertainment Network (SEN).

== History ==
Planning for the station began after a licence with the callsign 4KQ was granted in August 1946. It began broadcasting on 7 May 1947 on 650 kHz under the ownership of the Australian Labor Party. The station was involved in number of controversies relating to this ownership.

On 1 September 1948, the station changed to 690 kHz, although was marketed as 4KQ 700. Originally transmitting with 1,000 watts at launch, approval was given to upgrade to 2000W in April 1954.

In 1978 the station moved to 693 kHz. In 1980, Michael Edgley, Col Joye and Michael Willesee purchased a combined 48.5% shareholding.

== 693 4KQ, The Best Country in the World ==
4KQ became a number 1 radio station in Brisbane in the very late 70s and early 80s with a format of American and Australian country music. The corporate voice for the station was Alan McGirvan (former announcer at 4IP during the 1970s). The station broadcast from plush studios at Breakfast Creek in Newstead. The PD was Ian Skippen and the music director was Ron Adsett. The station continued a format branded as The Best Country in the World, until mid-1986.

News bulletins were on the hour from 6am to 6pm, 7 days, with key newsreader Roy Jamieson. After 6pm, rip and read news bulletins were heard each hour. This is where the announcers would access the newsroom, collect the latest news stories coming through on the printer from Reuters, and deliver a 1 to 2 minute news update at the top of each hour after 6pm. Usually the first line or first two lines were read from each story.

== The Latest Hits and Greatest Memories years ==
In June 1986, 4KQ was purchased by Wesgo. Wesgo was known for its successful format at 2WS Sydney, being Latest Hits and Greatest Memories. 4KQs format changed from country music to the Wesgo formula of hits and memories, with Paul J Turner (formerly 4IP Breakfast announcer of the 70s) as the Program Director.

== More recent years ==
In 2020, 4KQ broadcast from the Brisbane suburb of Milton, after moving with its sister station 97.3 FM from Stones Corner. It presented a classic hits format of music from the 1960s, 1970s and 1980s, with some 1990s, aimed at listeners 40–54 years of age.

In late 2025, ARN announced that they would be launching a Gold DAB+ station in Brisbane. This has been called "4KQ's replacement".

=== Sale to SEN and rebrand ===
Following its purchase of Grant Broadcasters in November 2021, Here, There & Everywhere announced its intention to sell the station to comply with Australian Communications & Media Authority regulations that limit the number of radio stations an owner can have in one city. In May 2022, Sports Entertainment Network purchased the station.

Following the sale, SEN announced a rebrand to 693 SENQ and a programming change to "constant sporting content" as "Queensland's only dedicated sports station". On 30 June 2022 the station's former format ended, ending the long running service of breakfast announcers Laurel Edwards (30 years), Gary Clare (31 years), and Mark Hine (16 years).

== Programming ==
Prior the sale to SEN, 4KQ played classic hits. News Bulletins were aired hourly weekdays, with an increased half-hourly frequency during the Breakfast programme.

Traffic reports were also aired hourly, with an increased 15-minute frequency during the weekday Breakfast programme, and 20-minute frequency during the weekday Drive programme.

The station currently airs 24/7 sport coverage, with local announcers. Corey Parker & Ian Healy are on breakfast, with Ben Davis on mornings.
