= ARN Media =

Australian media company

ARN Media Ltd.
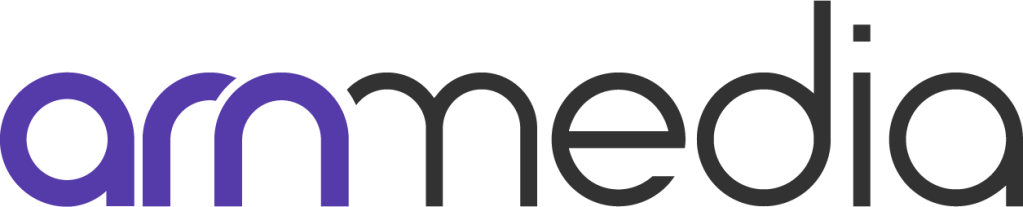
- Formerly: Australian Radio Network; Here, There & Everywhere; APN News & Media
- Type: Public
- Traded as: ASX: A1N
- Industry: Outdoor advertising Radio; Broadcasting
- Headquarters: 100 William Street, Sydney, Australia
- Number of locations: 33 markets
- Area served: Australia, Hong Kong
- Services: Radio: KIIS Network; Gold Network; ARN Regional; CADA; Digital media: iHeartRadio
- Revenue: A$252.7m
- Net income: A$54.6m
- Website: www.arn.com.au

ARN Media Ltd., formerly Here, There & Everywhere and APN News & Media, is an Australian media company. Divisions include broadcast radio and out-of-home advertising. The company previously had assets in New Zealand, and previously owned Adshel, APN Outdoor and Gfinity eSports in Australia. Its commercial radio stations include the Gold Network, KIIS Network, CADA, ARN Regional and iHeartRadio brands.

The company operates the ARN News service in Australia, which uses international correspondents and source news stories from AAP in Australia, CNN from the United States and Sky News and Independent Radio News from the United Kingdom. ARN has newsrooms in Sydney, Melbourne, Canberra, Brisbane and Adelaide.

Originally ARN was a joint venture of APN News & Media and Clear Channel (now iHeartMedia). On 19 February 2014, it was reported that APN News & Media had agreed to purchase Clear Channel's 50% stake in the ARN. As a result, ARN is now fully owned by ARN Media. The company continues to operate the Australian version of iHeartRadio.

Until 2014, ARN also included New Zealand radio networks Newstalk ZB, Classic Hits FM, ZM, Radio Sport, Radio Hauraki, Easy Mix, Flava and Coast under umbrella company The Radio Network. These are now part of New Zealand Media and Entertainment.

In August 2021, the company removed the words 'Australian Radio Network' from its name, now being known as simply ARN. Three months later, in November 2021, Here, There & Everywhere, ARN's parent company, purchased Grant Broadcasters, who intend to integrate it with its own business by January 2022. The deal was finalised on 4 January 2022.

Having already acquired a 15% stake in Southern Cross Austereo (SCA) earlier in the year, in October 2023 ARN launched a takeover offer for SCA in partnership with Anchorage Capital Partners. To satisfy Australian Communications & Media Authority regulations that allow one party to only own two radio stations in one market, in capital cities ARN would add the Triple M network to the KIIS Network, while Anchorage Capital Partners would control the Hit and Pure Gold networks.

== History ==
Former Here, There & Everywhere logo

APN News & Media logo 1998–2017

ARN radio logo

ARN Media had its origins in Provincial Newspapers (PN), a listed company that published regional newspapers in New South Wales and Queensland. The Herald & Weekly Times, which owned a significant proportion of PNQ, was taken over by News Limited in 1987. To comply with an order of the Trade Practices Commission, News Limited was required to sell its PN shares. The 48% stake in PN was acquired in 1988 by interests associated with the family of Tony O'Reilly, the principal shareholder of Independent Newspapers of Ireland.

The company was renamed Australian Provincial Newspapers Holdings and listed again on the Australian Securities Exchange in 1992 following a public share issue, and in 1998 the name was changed to APN News & Media.

In 2001, APN acquired 25% of Soprano Design, later going on to acquire stakes in Conversant Media and Unbnd Group. These acquisitions have been listed every year in their financial reports. Soprano Design was valued at over A$500 million in November 2019, giving APN over A$125m in equity. Following Soprano's acquisition of SilverStreet Intl in December 2020, Analysts have stated that Soprano Design could be worth upward of $1 billion.

In June 2016, the company completed the demerger of its New Zealand radio and publishing business, New Zealand Media and Entertainment. However, the company maintained a presence in New Zealand via its outdoor advertising business, Adshel NZ. Also in 2016, the company announced it would sell its regional newspaper division, Australian Regional Media, to News Corp Australia for $36.6 million. The deal was reviewed but not opposed by the Australian Competition & Consumer Commission. The sale of ARM, encompassing APN's remaining newspaper assets, was completed in December 2016.

APN News & Media Limited changed its name to HT&E Limited in May 2017, changing its ASX Listing Code to HT1.

In June 2018, oOh!media purchased street furniture business Adshel for A$570 million from HT&E, in a competitive bidding war against rival (and former HT&E subsidiary) APN Outdoor.

In January 2023, the company sold its 25% stake in communications firm Soprano. In May 2023, Here, There & Everywhere was renamed ARN Media. In June 2023, ARN acquired a 15% shareholding in major competitor Southern Cross Austereo. In October 2023, ARN launched a takeover offer for SCA in partnership with Anchorage Capital Partners. To satisfy Australian Communications & Media Authority regulations that allow one party to only own two radio stations in one market, in capital cities ARN would own the KIIS and Triple M networks, while Anchorage Capital Partners would control the Hit and Pure Gold networks. The deal collapsed after Anchorage withdrew.

== Assets ==
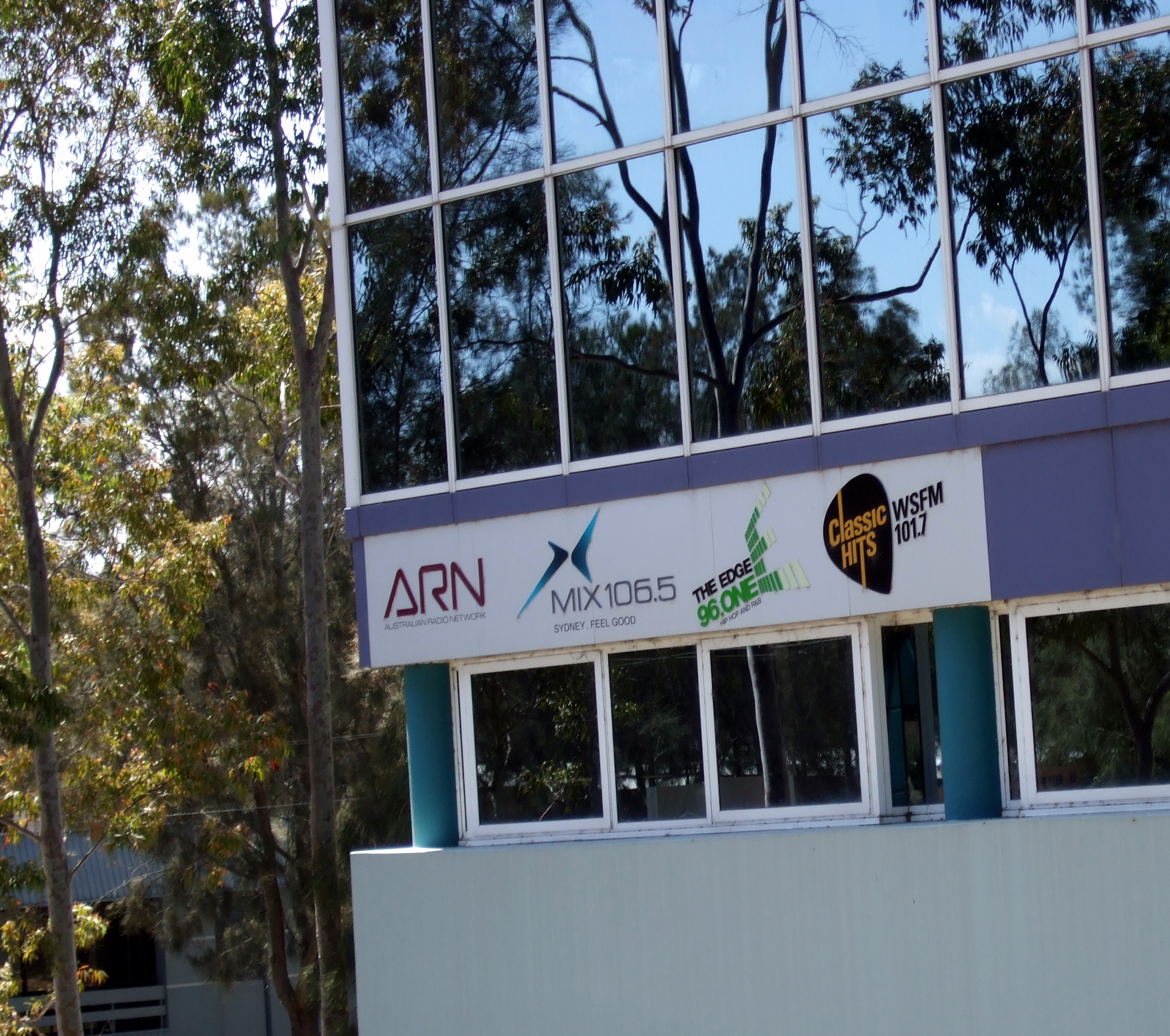
KIIS 106.5, CADA and 101.7 WSFM studios in North Ryde

ARN operates 58 radio stations, targeting the 25-to-54-year-old demographic. These stations include

- the top 40 (CHR) formatted KIIS Network
- the adult contemporary formatted Gold Network
- the rhythmic top 40 and urban contemporary-formatted CADA
- joint venture stations Mix 106.3 and Hit104.7 in Canberra with Southern Cross Austereo
- other radio stations via DAB+ digital radio and iHeartRadio
- 46 radio stations acquired from Grant Broadcasters

=== KIIS Network ===
Callsign	Frequency	Branding	Location	Format	Notes
2WFM	106.5 MHz FM	KIIS 106.5	Sydney, New South Wales	Top 40 (CHR)	Formerly 2UW and Mix 106.5
3TTT	101.1 MHz FM	KIIS 101.1	Melbourne, Victoria	Top 40 (CHR)	Formerly 3DB, 3TT, TTFM and Mix 101.1
4BFM	097.3 MHz FM	KIIS 97.3	Brisbane, Queensland	Top 40 (CHR)	Joint venture with Nova Entertainment; Formerly 97.3FM
5ADD	102.3 MHz FM; 096.7 MHz FM (repeater)	KIIS 102.3	Adelaide, South Australia	Top 40 (CHR)	Formerly 5DN, Radio 102FM, 5AD FM and Mix 102.3
N/A	DAB+ digital radio	KIIS Perth	Perth, Western Australia	Top 40 (CHR)	Launched in 2026

=== Gold Network ===
Callsign	Frequency	Branding	Location	Format	Notes
1CBR	106.3 MHz FM; 107.1 MHz FM (repeater)0	Mix 106.3	Canberra, Australian Capital Territory	Adult contemporary	Joint venture with Southern Cross Austereo; Formerly Kix 106
2UUS	101.7 MHz FM; 088.3 MHz FM; 099.1 MHz FM	Gold 101.7	Sydney, New South Wales	Adult contemporary	Formerly WSFM and 2WS
3KKZ	104.3 MHz FM	Gold 104.3	Melbourne, Victoria	Adult contemporary	Formerly 3KZ and KZFM
N/A	DAB+ digital radio	Gold Brisbane	Brisbane, Queensland	Adult contemporary	Launched 19 January 2026
5DN	1323 kHz AM	Gold 1323	Adelaide, South Australia	Oldies	Formerly 5AD, Radio 1323, SEN 1323 and Cruise 1323
N/A	DAB+ digital radio	Gold Adelaide	Adelaide, South Australia	Adult contemporary	Launched 19 January 2026
6NOW	096.1 MHz FM	Gold 96FM	Perth, Western Australia	Adult contemporary	Formerly Triple M

=== Other stations ===
Callsign	Frequency	Branding	Location	Format	Notes
2ONE	96.1 MHz FM	CADA	Katoomba, New South Wales	Rhythmic top 40; Urban contemporary	Formerly 2KA, OneFM and The Edge 96.ONE
2ROC	104.7 MHz FM; 100.7 MHz FM	Hit104.7	Canberra, Australian Capital Territory	Top 40 (CHR)	Joint venture with Southern Cross Austereo
6PER	93.7 MHz FM	Nova 93.7	Perth, Western Australia	Top 40 (CHR)	Joint venture with Nova Entertainment
N/A	N/A	Woolworths Radio	Woolworths stores and IHeartRadio	Adult contemporary	Branded station for all Woolworths stores

=== Digital radio ===
ARN also broadcasts a number of digital only radio stations.

Branding	Frequency	Location	Format	Notes
Chemist Warehouse Remix	DAB+ block 9B (VHF, Sydney and Melbourne) DAB+ block 9A (VHF, Brisbane and Adelaide)	Sydney, New South Wales; Melbourne, Victoria; Brisbane, Queensland; Adelaide, South Australia	Adult contemporary	
The '80s	DAB+ block 9B (VHF, Sydney and Melbourne) DAB+ block 9A (VHF, Brisbane and Adelaide)	Sydney, New South Wales; Melbourne, Victoria; Brisbane, Queensland; Adelaide, South Australia	1980s music	Gold 80s Sydney; Gold 80s Melbourne; Gold 80s Brisbane; Gold 80s Adelaide; Gold 80s Perth
The '90s	DAB+ block 9B (VHF, Sydney and Melbourne) DAB+ block 9A (VHF, Brisbane and Adelaide)	Sydney, New South Wales; Melbourne, Victoria; Brisbane, Queensland; Adelaide, South Australia	1990s music	KIIS 90s Sydney; KIIS 90s Melbourne; KIIS 90s Brisbane; KIIS 90s Adelaide; KIIS 90s Perth
CADA	DAB+ block 9B (VHF, Sydney and Melbourne) DAB+ block 9A (VHF, Brisbane and Adelaide)	Sydney, New South Wales; Melbourne, Victoria; Brisbane, Queensland; Adelaide, South Australia	Rhythmic top 40; Urban contemporary	

=== Former stations ===
Branding	Frequency	Location	Format	Notes
4BH	1116kHz AM	Brisbane, Queensland	Easy listening	Sold to Nova Entertainment in 2002
4KQ	693kHz AM	Brisbane, Queensland	Classic Hits	Sold to Sports Entertainment Network in 2022
PureCountry	Online streaming	Worldwide, based in Sydney	Country music	Closed in 2009
KseraRadio.com	Online streaming	Worldwide, based in Sydney	Rhythmic top 40; Urban contemporary	Closed
Classic Hits Live	DAB+ block 9B (VHF, Sydney and Melbourne) DAB+ block 9A (VHF, Brisbane and Adelaide)	Sydney, New South Wales; Melbourne, Victoria; Brisbane, Queensland; Adelaide, South Australia	Classic hits	Replaced by Pure Gold '80s in 2010
Classic Hits Plus	DAB+ block 9B (VHF, Sydney and Melbourne) DAB+ block 9A (VHF, Brisbane and Adelaide)	Sydney, New South Wales; Melbourne, Victoria; Brisbane, Queensland; Adelaide, South Australia	Classic hits	Replaced by Pure Gold '90s in 2010

== Outdoor/Advertising ==
- CODY Out-of-Home (Hong Kong)
- Emotive (creative agency)

== Bibliography ==
- Kirkpatrick, Rod (1994). "Six dynasties that ended with a whimper: the end of the PNQ" (PDF). Australian Studies in Journalism (3): 109–129.
