= KIIS 102.3 =

Radio station in Adelaide, Australia

KIIS 1023 (5ADD)
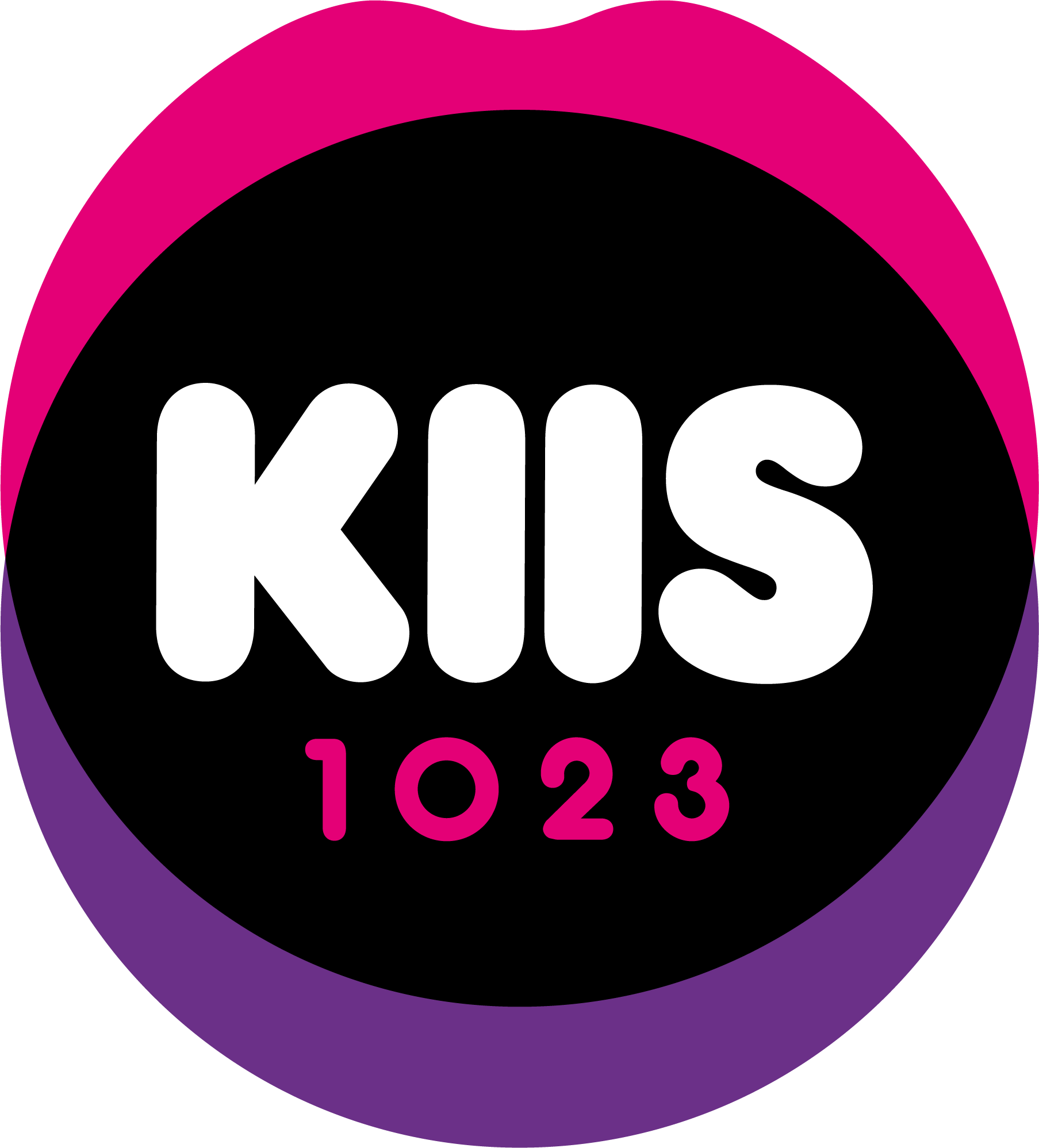
- Adelaide, South Australia; Australia
- Broadcast area: Adelaide
- Frequencies: 102.3 MHz and DAB+

Programming
- Language: English
- Format: Top 40 (CHR)
- Network: KIIS Network

Ownership
- Owner: ARN Media; (5AD Broadcasting Company Pty Ltd)
- Sister stations: Cruise 1323

History
- First air date: 2 August 1930 (as 5AD)
- Former names: Mix 102.3 (2001–2026)
- Former frequencies: 1310 kHz AM (1930–1978); 1323 kHz AM (1978–1992

Technical information
- Licensing authority: ACMA
- ERP: 20 kW
- Transmitter coordinates: 34°58′57″S 138°42′30″E
- Repeaters: 96.7 MHz (Adelaide Foothills, 2 kW)

Links
- Public licence information: Profile
- Website: https://kiis1023.com.au/

KIIS 1023 (call sign 5ADD) is a commercial FM radio station in Adelaide, Australia, owned by ARN Media.

KIIS 1023 plays current hits and 2000s and 2010s music (Top 40), primarily targeted at the 25–54 age group. It is part of the KIIS Network.

== History ==
KIIS 1023 began its life as AM (1310 later 1323 kHz) station 5AD on 2 August 1930, originally owned by Advertiser Newspapers, who also owned local television station ADS-7 from 1959 until 1986.

During its early years, 5AD broadcast a wide range of programs, from orchestral concerts to comedies, serials and sporting events. Some programs, such as the comedy "Yes, What?" were produced in Adelaide for broadcast by other Major Broadcasting Network stations around Australia. (5DN was the Adelaide outlet for the Major Network.) Children's programs included "Search for the Golden Boomerang", and the "Kangaroos on Parade", for the Kangaroo Club, a 5AD sponsored children's club noted for support of children's charities.

Television was introduced to Adelaide in 1959, bringing major changes to radio programming, signalling the end of the kind of block programming 5AD and other stations had been playing. 5AD moved to music based programming, using a number of marketing slogans: "Action Radio 5AD", "Power Radio 5AD, Where Your Friends Are", among others.

5AD personalities of the 1960s and 1970s included Bob Francis, Alec Macaskill, Keith Conlon, Barry Ion who also voiced the hilarious Peter Plus character, Tony Pilkington, Malcolm T Elliott, Sam Galea, Ken Dickin, John Vincent, Bob Byrne, Dean Jaensch, Jeff Sunderland, Kevin Crease, and many others.

5AD was also instrumental in bringing The Beatles to Adelaide in 1964 and Culture Club in 1984 after both bands had not originally included the city on their Australian tours.

As general manager, Bob Francis took the station into ratings records in the late 1970s and 1980s. He took over the role after his morning show ended in 1976 until stepping down to present the night show for radio 5AA. In the early 1980s 5AD was the number one radio station in Adelaide, spearheaded by the Bazz and Pilko breakfast show, rating at above 30% of the total Adelaide audience. As a top 40 station with its slogan "Rhythm of the City", 5AD was the clear market leader in Adelaide radio. 5AD won all day parts, including mornings with Peter Butler, afternoons with Sam Angelsea and the popular night show for teenagers "Dial a Hit" hosted by Steve Mill and Di Stapleton. But the station's ratings collapsed when its star breakfast duo of Bazz and Pilko defected to rival station 5KA in 1983. In 1985, after a number of poor surveys, 5AD decided to try something new and moved to an Easy Listening format, first as "Easy Listening 5AD", then "Today's easy listening 5AD" then "Adelaide's Best Place to Relax". By mid 1992, 5AD was again the number one station in Adelaide, with its breakfast show "Sundo & Keith" number one for a record 50 consecutive surveys.

Due to changes in media ownership laws which meant a newspaper and a TV or radio station could no longer be owned by the same company in the same market, 5AD was sold in 1987 to Hoyts Media, owner of the Triple M network in the Eastern States.

In 1991 5AD was sold again to Montclair Investments. The owners of Montclair included former 5DN personality Jeremy Cordeaux and former 5DN station manager Sue Fraser. In 1992 they made an offer to buy low rating FM radio station X102 (formerly 5DN and Radio 102 FM) from Mount Gambier businessman Allan Scott.

The transaction proceeded and 5AD was immediately simulcast on the 102.3 FM frequency from July 1993. It proved to be an instant success in both ratings and advertising terms with the station continuing to simulcast on the AM frequency.

However the Australian Broadcasting Authority directed the simulcast must end as it provided the station with an unfair advantage in terms of audience reach. As the 5DN call sign remained aligned with the ownership of the FM frequency, 5AD FM's owners decided to place a hybrid talk format on the AM band and so launched Radio 1323 with a number of former 5DN personalities including Jeremy Cordeaux, Nan Witcomb and Bob Byrne. This new station proved equally challenging and the owners later decided to reinvent it as 5DN in 1994, then later SEN and finally as oldies music station Cruise 1323 in 2005.

In 2001 5AD-FM was sold to ARN who then re-branded it as Mix 102.3.

In October 2025, ARN announced Mix 102.3 would be rebranded to KIIS 1023 with the music format to change to Contemporary Hit Radio. It was also announced that Hayley and Max in the Morning would cease and be replaced by Ben & Liam.

In January 2026, workday announcer, Michelle Murphy, departed the station after 10 years of hosting the Adelaide workday. It was also announced that Ben & Liam wouldn't join the station on breakfast, until April 1, 2026, due to a non compete clause in their NOVA contracts.
