= Gold 104.3 =

GOLD104.3 (3KKZ)
- Melbourne, Victoria; Australia
- Frequencies: 104.3 MHz and DAB+
- Branding: GOLD104.3

Programming
- Language: English
- Format: Adult contemporary
- Affiliations: GOLD Network

Ownership
- Owner: ARN Media; (KZFM Radio Pty Ltd)
- Sister stations: KIIS 101.1

History
- First air date: 8 December 1930; 95 years ago
- Former call signs: 3KZ (1930–1990)
- Former names: KZFM (1990–1991)
- Former frequencies: 1350 kHz (1930–1935); 1180 kHz (1935–1978); 1179 kHz (1978–1990)
- Call sign meaning: 3 for Victoria and KKZ for an FM callsign requiring three letters instead of two as on AM

Technical information
- Licensing authority: ACMA
- ERP: 56 kW

Links
- Public licence information: Profile
- Website: www.gold1043.com.au

GOLD104.3 (call sign: 3KKZ) is a radio station broadcasting in Melbourne, Australia. It is part of ARN Media's Gold Network and broadcasts on 104.3 MHz frequency.

== History ==
=== 3KZ ===
3KZ commenced operations on 8 December 1930. The radio station was initiated by the Industrial Printing and Publicity Group as a means of spreading its message, and in the station's early years, it was broadcast from the Victorian Trades Hall.

Its original frequency was 1350 kHz, moving to 1180 kHz on 1 September 1935. The frequency changed again on 23 November 1978 to 1179 kHz when all Australian AM radio stations were assigned new frequencies as part of the new 9 kHz spacing plan.

In 1989, 3KZ was one of two successful bidders to convert to the FM band.

=== KZFM ===
As a result of winning an FM licence, 3KZ moved to 104.3 MHz on 1 January 1990. The station relaunched as KZFM, despite the station's official call sign of 3KKZ, carrying over its successful "Hits And Memories" positioner, with some changes to presentation style. KZFM was simulcasted on both 1179 kHz and 104.3 MHz frequencies for one month before the old AM frequency was closed down, to be later reassigned (after 12 months) to 3RPH.

The KZ switch to FM paid immediate short term dividends, as the new KZFM debuted at number one in the first ratings survey of 1990, breaking an almost three-year dominance by Fox FM. However KZFM's success was short-lived, with ratings soon taking a dive and the station going into receivership in 1993. Austereo purchased the station to supplement Fox FM. After Austereo merged with Triple M, KZFM was sold to Wesgo in 1995 to comply with Trade Practices Commission laws that allowed one organisation to only own two radio stations in the same market.

=== GOLD104.3 ===
On 7 October 1991, the KZFM branding was replaced with a new name of Gold 104 with a revamped playlist predominantly of hit songs from the 1960s and 1970s, under the banner "Good Times, Great Oldies". After the change in ownership with the Australian Radio Network, Gold became stable enough to re-build its market position, and return much of its heritage style from its days as 3KZ to the on-air presentation of the station. The original Gold 104 presenters were Shawn Cosgrove, Liz Sullivan, Gavin Wood, Craig Huggins, Bruce Neels and Phil Baildon.

GOLD104.3 and sister station KIIS 101.1 broadcast from shared facilities, in the Pelaco Building in the Melbourne suburb of Richmond. In January 2015, the station has gradually shifted from classic hits to a more contemporary format that now predominantly focuses on hits from the 1970s, 1980s, 1990s, 2000s, and 2010s; the 1960s songs have officially discontinued. The slogan changed from "Good Times and Great Classic Hits" to "Real music, real variety / Pure Gold" and later "Better Music and More of It" in 2017.

In January 2025, the station refreshed its on-air presentation with a new slogan: "Just Great Songs" and plays more hits from the 1980s, 1990s, 2000s and 2010s. In July 2025, Craig "Huggy" Huggins was the last of the original line up to leave after 34 years although remains as a fill-in announcer on Gold104.3.

The current presenters include Christian O'Connell, Dave Higgins, Toni Tenaglia and Jonesy & Amanda.

== Breakfast shows since 1999 ==
- April 1999 – December 2011 – Grubby & Dee Dee for Breakfast
- January 2012 – December 2015 – Brig & Lehmo for Breakfast
- January 2016 – December 2017 – Jo & Lehmo for Breakfast
- June 2018 – present – The Christian O'Connell Show
