= Gold 101.7 =

Radio station in Sydney, Australia

GOLD101.7 (2UUS)
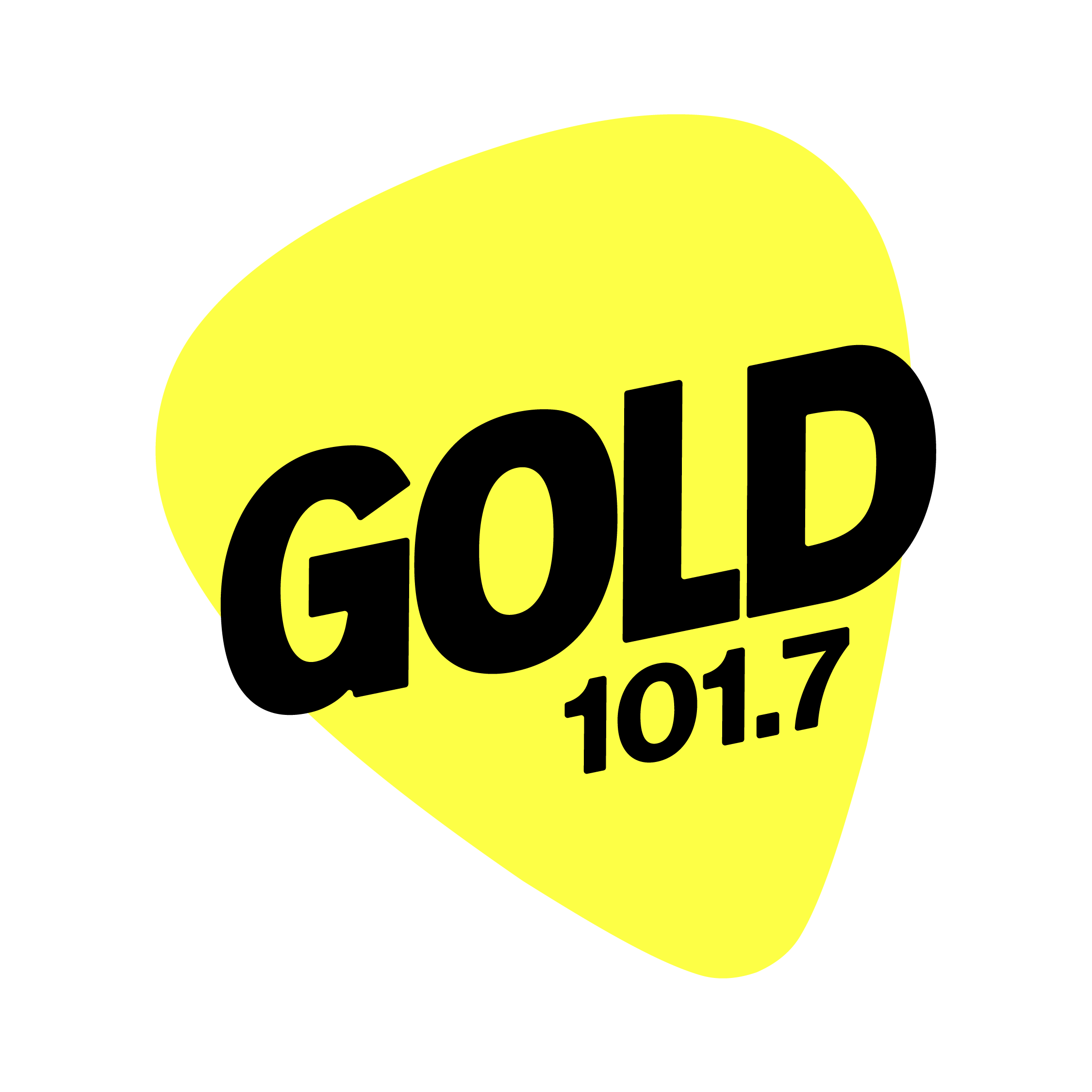
- Sydney, New South Wales; Australia
- Frequencies: 101.7 MHz FM and DAB+
- Branding: GOLD101.7

Programming
- Language: English
- Format: Adult contemporary
- Affiliations: Gold Network

Ownership
- Owner: ARN
- Sister stations: KIIS 106.5, CADA

History
- First air date: 23 November 1978 (as 2WS)
- Former call signs: 2WS (1978–1993)
- Former names: WSFM (2001–2025)
- Former frequencies: 1224 kHz (1978–1993)
- Call sign meaning: "UUS" similar to final AM call sign

Technical information
- Licensing authority: ACMA
- ERP: 150 kW
- Transmitter coordinates: 33°48′20″S 151°10′51″E
- Repeaters: 88.3 FM Camden; 99.1 FM Richmond

Links
- Public licence information: Profile
- Website: www.gold1017.com.au

Gold 101.7 (call sign: 2UUS) is a commercial radio station broadcasting in Sydney, Australia. Its main content is commercial music, in particular classic hits from the 1980s to today. The station is part of the Gold Network (which itself is a part of ARN).

Gold's main frequency is 101.7 MHz on the FM band, with two repeaters in the outer suburbs of Sydney: 88.3 MHz in the Macarthur region, and 99.1 MHz centred in the Richmond/Hawkesbury region. It previously transmitted on 1224 kHz on the AM band; this frequency is now used by print-handicapped radio station 2RPH.

The station adopted its current name of Gold 101.7 on 2 January 2025.

== Music ==
Gold's former catchlines (as WSFM) were “Sydney's Classic Hits” (1999–2002)....”Good Times and Great Classic Hits” (2002–2014).....”Real music, real variety / Pure Gold” (2014–2017) & “Better Music and More of It” (2017–2025).

From January 2025, its current catchline is now titled “Just Great Songs”. Gold 101.7 generally plays classic hits from the seventies onwards, as well as current hits.

== History ==
Liverpool Broadcasting and Transmitting Co Pty Ltd was granted an AM radio licence in the late 1970s, specifically to serve the Western Suburbs of Sydney. 2WS began broadcasting at 12:24 am on 23 November 1978 – the same day all Australian AM radio stations switched from 10 kHz to 9 kHz frequencies – from temporary studios in a relocated cottage at 2 Leabons Lane, Seven Hills with a 5 kW transmitter located at nearby Prospect.

The studios subsequently moved, in October 1979, into a purpose-built complex behind the old cottage in Leabons Lane. The original building was demolished, with the material donated to charity.

In the early 1990s the station was granted an FM licence covering the full Sydney metropolitan area. Its original FM transmitter was located in Willoughby on the Channel 9 TV Tower, later moving in with sister station, MIX106.5 (now KIIS) to Artarmon, in northern Sydney. The official callsign was changed to 2UUS (using a literal 'double-U' to compensate for the extra letter required), although the station still identified as 2WS until 2001, when they changed their on-air name to WSFM.

2WS, 1224 on the A.M. band converted to the FM band and began broadcasting as 2WS-FM on 101.7 MHz on 1 June 1993 at 8 a.m.

In 2002, WSFM's studio was located in Macquarie Park. In 2024 it moved to new studios at Coca-Cola Place, North Sydney. The building also houses facilities for KIIS 106.5 and CADA, both also owned by ARN.

The original studios at Leabons Lane, Seven Hills are now occupied by Christian/Adult Contemporary radio station, Hope 103.2.

In January 2025, WSFM was rebranded to Gold 101.7, bringing it in line with Gold 104.3 in Melbourne. The station will now target a younger 25-54 age demographic whilst still appealing to the station's loyal fan base.
