= Australian Commercial Radio Awards =

Australian award

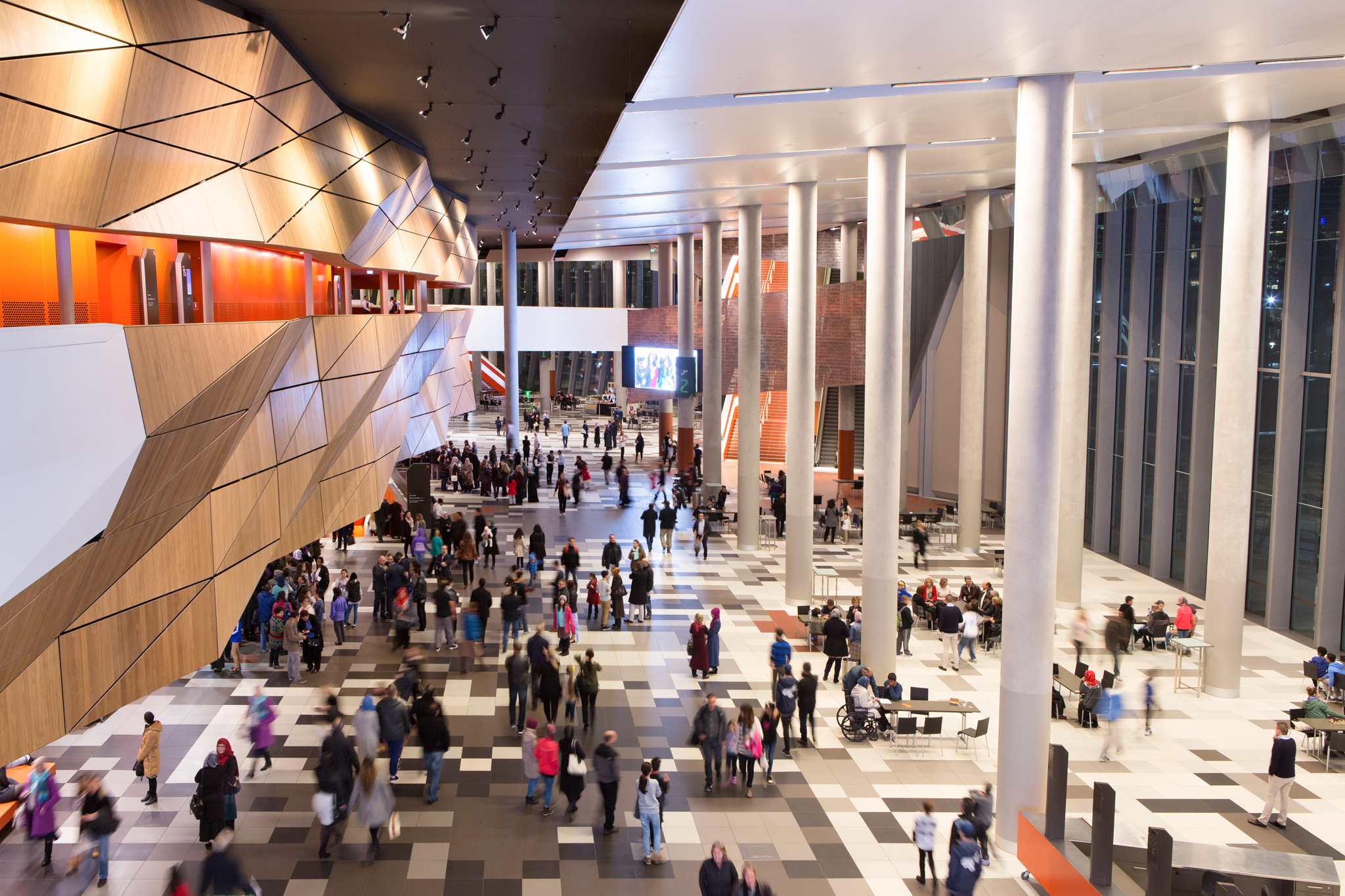
Main Foyer of the Melbourne Convention & Exhibition Centre, where the ACRAs were held in 2017.

The Australian Commercial Radio Awards (ACRAs), previously known as the rAWARDS, were an Australian award ceremony held to recognise outstanding achievements in the radio industry. They were first held in 1989, and recognise excellence in all areas of Australian radio broadcasting including news, talk, sport, music and entertainment. They are run annually by Commercial Radio Australia and hosted in either Sydney, Melbourne, Brisbane or the Gold Coast.

There are typically 33 award categories that are peer judged across three divisions: metropolitan, provincial and country commercial radio stations. All judging panels are composed of industry members.

In September 2025, Commercial Radio Australia announced the permanent cancellation of the Commercial Australian Radio Awards (ACRAs), citing high operational costs and a strategic shift toward funding alternative initiatives. New awards for the Australian radio and podcast industries were established in 2025 after the ACRAs were cancelled.

== Awards Format ==
The awards are organised into various categories, with nominees being announced a few weeks before the main awards ceremony. Usually four (on rare occasions five) entries are shortlisted in each of the three divisions and an overall division winner is selected from these finalists, meaning three separate awards are given out per category (one each for metropolitan, provincial and country). A hall of fame member is also generally inducted each year.

The night is hosted by an industry member (or members), who is (are) generally employed in an on-air capacity, with revolving hosts throughout the night presenting specific awards.

== Previous Winners ==
A full list of winners can be found on the Australian Commercial Radio Awards website. All winners listed below are in the Metropolitan division.

| Year | Best On-Air Team | | Best Networked Program | Best Music Presenter | Best Talk Presenter | Hall of Fame Inductee | Host | City |
| Year | FM | AM | Best Networked Program | Best Music Presenter | Best Talk Presenter | Hall of Fame Inductee | Host | City |
| 2024 | Jonesy & Amanda; Brendan Jones, Amanda Keller, WSFM | Mixx Brekky with Jimmy & Lippi, Matt Lipiarski, James Thwaites, Mixx FM | Kyle & Jackie O Hour of Power, ARN | Ugly Phil; WSFM | Ben Fordham, 2GB | Bob Rogers OAM | | Sydney |
| 2023 | Jonesy & Amanda; Brendan Jones, Amanda Keller, WSFM | Mixx Brekky with Jimmy & Lippi, Matt Lipiarski, James Thwaites, Mixx FM | Kyle & Jackie O Hour of Power, ARN | Ellie Angel-Mobbs; B105, Brisbane | Neil Mitchell; 3AW | Laurel Edwards & Steve Price | Robin Bailey, Kip Wightman, Tim Blackwell, Joel Creasey, Jimmy Smith, Nath Roye, Sofie Formica and Ray Hadley. | Sydney |
| 2022 | The Kyle & Jackie O Show, Australian Radio Network | 3AW Breakfast with Ross Stevenson & Russel Howcroft, 3AW | Kyle & Jackie O Hour of Power, ARN | Mitch Churi, KIIS Network, Sydney | Neil Mitchell; 3AW | Kyle & Jackie O | Amanda Keller and Brendan Jones | |
| 2020/21 | The Kyle & Jackie O Show, Australian Radio Network | 3AW Breakfast with Ross Stevenson & Russel Howcroft, 3AW | Kate, Tim & Joel, Nova Entertainment | Chris Beckhouse; Triple M, Sydney | Ben Fordham, 2GB | - | | |
| 2019 | Jonesy & Amanda; Brendan Jones, Amanda Keller, WSFM | Afternoons with Erin Molan & Natalie Peters, 2GB | Kate, Tim & Marty, Nova Entertainment | Kent “Smallzy” Small, Nova Network | Ben Fordham, 2GB | Doug Mulray | Amanda Keller and Brendan Jones | Brisbane |
| 2018 | The Kyle & Jackie O Show, Australian Radio Network | Ray Hadley's Continuous Call Team, 2GB | Kate, Tim & Marty, Nova Entertainment | Melissa Doyle, smoothfm | Ben Fordham, 2GB | Lee Simon | | Melbourne |
| 2017 | Kate, Tim and Marty, Nova Network | Continuous Call Team (Ray Hadley, Erin Molan, Darryl Brohman, Bob Fulton, David Morrow, Mark Riddell, Chris Warren & Mark Levy), 2GB | The Kyle and Jackie O Show (Kyle Sandilands & Jackie Henderson), Australian Radio Network | Kent 'Smallzy' Small, Nova Network | Ray Hadley, 2GB | Amanda Keller | Andrew Hansen and Chris Taylor | Melbourne |
| 2016 | Kate, Tim and Marty, Nova Network | Nights with Steve Price, Steve Price & Andrew Bolt, 2GB | The Hamish & Andy Show, Hamish Blake & Andy Lee, Southern Cross Austereo | Kent 'Smallzy' Small, Nova Network | Ben Fordham, 2GB | Cathy O'Connor | TBC | Melbourne |
| 2015 | The Kyle & Jackie O Show, KIIS 106.5 | 3AW Breakfast (Ross Stevenson & John Burns), 3AW | Kate, Tim & Marty, Nova Network | Tim Blackwell, Nova Network | Ben Fordham, 2GB | Jeremy Cordeaux | Stephen Curry | Gold Coast |
| 2014 | Jonesy & Amanda, WSFM | 3AW Breakfast (Ross Stevenson & John Burns), 3AW | The Ray Hadley Morning Show, Macquarie Radio Network | Chris Beckhouse, Triple M Sydney | Ben Fordham, 2GB | Peter Harvey | Shane Jacobson | Melbourne |
| 2013 | The Kyle & Jackie O Show, 2Day FM | 3AW Breakfast (Ross Stevenson & John Burns), 3AW | The Best of Fitzy and Wippa, DMG Radio Australia | Kent Small, Nova Network | Ray Hadley, 2GB | Kevin Blyton | Charlie Pickering | Brisbane |
| 2012 | Jonesy & Amanda, WSFM | Continuous Call Team (Ray Hadley, Steve Roach, Darryl Brohman & Bob Fulton), 2GB | The Kyle & Jackie O Show, Southern Cross Austereo | Dylan Lewis, Nova 100 | Ray Hadley, 2GB | Graham Mott | Merrick Watts & Sharon Osbourne | Sydney |
| 2011 | The Kyle & Jackie O Show, 2Day FM | 3AW Breakfast (Ross Stevenson & John Burns), 3AW | The Ray Hadley Morning Show, Macquarie Radio Network | Tim Lee, Fox FM | Neil Mitchell, 3AW | Tony Pilkington | Amanda Keller & Kelsey Grammer | Gold Coast |
| 2010 | The Hamish & Andy Show, Fox FM | | The Ray Hadley Morning Show, Macquarie Radio Network | Ugly Phil, Triple M Sydney | Derryn Hinch, 3AW | Derryn Hinch | Roy & HG | Melbourne |
| 2009 | The Hamish & Andy Show, Fox FM | | The Hamish & Andy Show, Today Network | Dylan Lewis, Nova 100 | Derryn Hinch, 3AW | Des DeCean | Osher Günsberg | Sydney |
| 2008 | The Hamish & Andy Show, Fox FM | | The Hamish & Andy Show, Today Network | Mike Fitzpatrick, Triple M Melbourne | Neil Mitchell, 3AW | Not awarded | Osher Günsberg | Gold Coast |
| 2007 | The Kyle & Jackie O Show, 2Day FM | | The Hamish & Andy Show, Today Network | Jabba, Nova 96.9 | Neil Mitchell, 3AW | Neil Mitchell; Greg Smith | Jono Coleman | Melbourne |
| 2006 | The Kyle & Jackie O Show, 2Day FM | | The Kyle & Jackie O Show, Southern Cross Austereo | Bianca Dye, Nova 96.9 | Neil Mitchell, 3AW | Frank Hyde | John Cleese | Luna Park Sydney |
