= KIIS Breakfast =

Australian radio show

Coordinates: 33.5240°S 151.1222°E

- Genre: Celebrity, comedy, talk, music
- Running time: Weekdays 6am–9am (KIIS 106.5); Weekdays 6am-10am (KIIS 101.1)
- Country of origin: Australia
- Language: English
- Home station: KIIS 106.5; KIIS 101.1
- Hosted by: KIIS 1065: Chris Brown; Amy Gerard; Jack Charles; KIIS 1011: Ash London; Isaac Smith; Elliot Garnaut
- Produced by: Zane Dean (Studio Producer); Dan Atkinson (Digital)
- Executive producer: Nat Penfold
- Recording studio: North Sydney, New South Wales, Australia (KIIS 1065); Melbourne, Victoria, Australia (KIIS 1011)
- Original release: 4 March 2026
- Audio format: Stereo
- Podcast: www.iheart.com/podcast/1300-kiis-breakfast-331112337/

KIIS Breakfast is an Australian breakfast radio show hosted by Michael Etheridge (Mike E) and rotating guest hosts on KIIS 106.5 in Sydney and KIIS 101.1 in Melbourne and can also be heard on iHeart Radio in Podcasts.

The show started on 4 March 2026 after Jackie O left The Kyle and Jackie O Show and Kyle Sandilands's contract was terminated. The show has had several hosts in its current short time running including Kent 'Smallzy' Small, Abbie Chatfield, Mike E and Brooklyn Ross. The show plans to end when ARN finds full time hosts to replace them.

== History ==
On 4 March 2026, KIIS Breakfast began airing with Kent Small as temporary host following the end of The Kyle and Jackie O Show. The previous program concluded after an on‑air dispute in which Kyle Sandilands criticised Jackie Henderson for discussing the birth and astrological charts of Andrew Mountbatten-Windsor. After the argument, Henderson took leave from the program and subsequently announced her resignation. Sandilands was removed from the air and suspended for "14 days to remedy this breach" under ARN's services agreement. During this period, Small hosted the breakfast slot; however, Sandilands ultimately did not return, with his 10‑year, $100 million contract being terminated.

On 16 March 2026, ARN announced Michael Etheridge (Mike E) would temporarily host KIIS Breakfast due to Sandilands' ongoing suspension and Smallzy’s existing commitments to two other programs. According to then‑newsreader Brooklyn Ross, "Last week, when they needed someone to fill in again, they were walking around saying, 'Who would come in and work with one day's notice and no idea how long they're going to actually get the job for?' I said 'Mike E.'".

In late March 2026, Ross, who had previously served as newsreader on The Kyle and Jackie O Show and continued in that role on KIIS Breakfast, joined the program as a co‑host while still performing his newsreading duties.

In April 2026, it was announced that Georgie Tunny would temporarily co‑host the program alongside Ross and Mike E. Tunny had previously been a presenter on The Project and was, at the time, host of ARN’s Two Good Sports podcast. She departed the program on 24 April, having been appointed for only a short-term stint.

Also on 24 April 2026, ARN announced that Abbie Chatfield would join KIIS Breakfast from 27 April. Chatfield had previously hosted the Hit Network’s Hot Nights with Abbie Chatfield, which ended in August 2023 after she chose to focus on her podcast It’s a Lot and television commitments. Her appointment to KIIS Breakfast drew mixed audience reactions. Chatfield's final day on the show was 1 May, with ARN indicating that a new host would be announced shortly.

On 8 May 2026, Ross released an Instagram video announcing that former producer Jaimee Blazquez would join the program following a 10‑week period of maternity leave. Blazquez commenced on 11 May 2026, with no confirmed duration for her tenure.

On 11 May 2026, long‑time segment contributor Pete Deppeler announced that he would be "graduating" from KIIS and moving to sister station Gold 104.3 to work on The Christian O'Connell Show. Deppeler officially transitioned on 25 May, becoming a roving reporter covering events across Australia and a senior producer on the program.

On 20 July 2026, Amy Gerard has joined back for another guest co-hosting stint. It was also announced the Gerard was the frontrunner for a permanent gig on KIIS Breakfast, but hasn't been confirmed.

On 23 July 2026, Mayo Jamiee Blazquez was announced to be leaving KIIS to jump ship and join Kyle Sandilands Live as an executive producer.

On 7 August 2026, Ross was announced to be also leaving the show, despite previously announcing on social media he doesn't plan to move. He will join Kyle Sandilands Live after being on air with KIIS for 10 years.

On 21 September 2026, it was revealed who will be replacing KIIS Breakfast for Sydney listeners, with Dr Chris Brown, Amy Gerard, Jack Charles and Nat Penfold all being a part of the new show launching on 9 November.

On 30 September 2026, KIIS 101.1 Melbourne announced Ash, Issie & Elliot, hosted by Ash London, Isaac Smith and Elliot Garnaut as its new breakfast team, with the show launching on 26 October 2026.

On 26 October 2026, KIIS Breakfast with Ash, Issie & Elliot Launched for Melbourne listeners. The Hits That Keep Perth Moving which plays non stop music also launched on that date.

On 9 November 2026, KIIS Breakfast with Chris, Amy & Jack launched for Sydney listeners.

== Games and segments ==
The KIIS Breakfast program has retained several long‑running segments previously associated with The Kyle and Jackie O Show.

These include:

=== Tradie vs Lady ===
Played each morning shortly after 6:00 am, the segment features two callers: a male listener representing the “tradies” and a female listener representing the “ladies”. Each contestant is asked three questions, with the male caller answering questions traditionally associated with women’s interests and the female caller answering questions associated with trades or stereotypically male interests.

=== Celebrity News ===
Broadcast hourly, this segment features the hosts delivering the latest celebrity news and gossip. Due to its popularity and long‑standing presence on the network, the segment frequently includes the program breaking both local and international entertainment stories.
