= KIIS DAB+ Perth =

- Perth, Western Australia; Australia
- Broadcast area: Perth, Western Australia
- Frequency: DAB+
- Branding: KIIS Perth

Programming
- Language: English
- Format: Top 40 (CHR)
- Affiliations: KIIS Network

Ownership
- Owner: ARN Media
- Sister stations: Gold 96FM

History
- First air date: 19 January 2026; 9 months ago

Links
- Website: kiisperth.com.au

KIIS DAB+ Perth is a commercial DAB radio station in Perth, Western Australia that started broadcast on 19 January 2026. The station is owned and operated by ARN Media under the KIIS Network branding and plays Top 40 hits like its KIIS sister stations.

As part of its content strategy plan, ARN Media announced on 29 October 2025 that it would take its KIIS and Gold networks national with the creation of new DAB+ digital stations for KIIS in Perth and for Gold in Adelaide and Brisbane, thereby giving both networks an outlet in all five capital cities.

== History ==
On October 29th, 2025 it was announced that it would take its KIIS and Gold networks national with the creation of new DAB+ digital stations for KIIS in Perth and for Gold in Adelaide and Brisbane, thereby giving both networks an outlet in all five capital cities.

On January 19th, KIIS Perth launches, replacing under-performing sister station CADA. Many people did not know about the station due to no announcement about its launch.

On February 20th, The Kyle and Jackie O Show ended after only being on air for a month, making it one of the shortest running breakfast shows for Perths radio history. The reason for the show ending was because of Jackie O leaving the show after Kyle on air argument. Kyle was shortly terminated later.

On March 4th KIIS Breakfast took over The Kyle and Jackie O show. The show has had a rotation of many hosts in its short time including Kent ‘Smallzy’ Small, Abbie Chatfield, Mike E.The show plans to end when ARN finds proper hosts.

== Line up ==
- The Hits That Keep Perth Moving / 6 - 10am Weekdays
- Gordie Waters / 10am - 3pm Weekdays
- The Smallzy Show / 3 - 4pm & 7 - 9pm Weekdays
- Will & Woody / 4 - 6pm Weekdays
- More Music Nights / 6 - 7pm Weekdays
- Lowie Live / 9pm - 12am Weekdays
- Ben & Liam / 6 - 8am Weekends

(Selected shows are repeated between 12 to 6am Weekdays)

2027 Lineup

- The Hits That Keep Perth Moving / 6 - 10am Weekdays
- Gordie Waters / 10am - 3pm Weekdays
- Carrie for the Drive Home / 3 - 6pm Weekdays
- The Smallzy Show / 6 - 9pm Weekdays
- Lowie Live / 9pm - 12am Weekdays
- Ben & Liam / 6 - 8am Saturdays
- KIIS Travel / 7 - 9am Sundays
- TikTok Trending with Ula / 6 - 7pm Saturdays
- True Crime Tonight / 6 - 7pm Sundays

== Criticism ==
On January 19th, KIIS Perth launched but there was no prior date announced and when launched there was no party or event for it compared to sister station KIIS 1023 which had a launch party for its rebrand.

People also have negative connotations with the station due to the hatred of Kyle and Jackie O in Western Australia.
