= The Kyle and Jackie O Show =

Australian radio show

Coordinates: 33.5240°S 151.1222°E

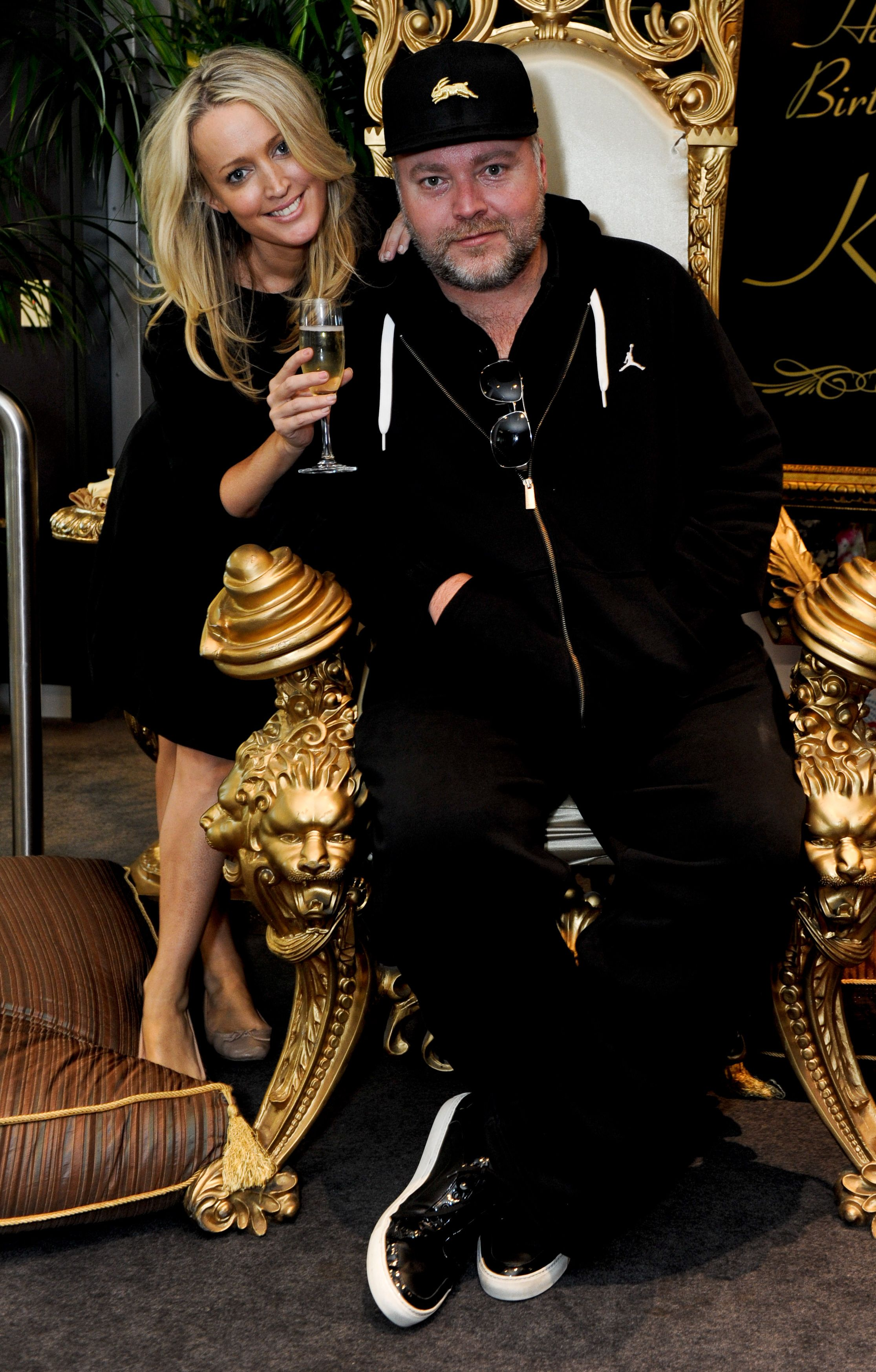
- Kyle Sandilands and Jackie O in 2011
- Other names: Kyle & Jackie O
- Genre: Celebrity, comedy, talk, music
- Running time: 240 minutes (6:00 am – 10:00 am)
- Country of origin: Australia
- Language: English
- Home station: KIIS 106.5; KIIS 101.1; KIIS DAB+ Perth
- Syndicates: KIIS Network; Super Radio Network
- TV adaptations: Kyle & Jackie O TV: Behind-the-Scenes (online)
- Hosted by: Kyle Sandilands; Jackie Henderson
- Starring: Brooklyn Ross
- Produced by: Jamiee Blazquez; Peter Deppeler; Alfie Laguzza; Zane Dean (Studio Producer); Dan Atkinson (Digital)
- Executive producer: Nat Penfold
- Recording studio: North Sydney, New South Wales, Australia
- Original release: 24 January 2004 – 20 February 2026
- Audio format: Stereo
- Website: kiis1065.com.au/shows/kyle-jackie-o
- Podcast: www.iheart.com/podcast/239-the-kyle-jackie-o-show-27242949/

The Kyle and Jackie O Show was an Australian breakfast radio show that was hosted by Kyle Sandilands and Jackie O on KIIS 106.5 in Sydney, KIIS DAB+ Perth and KIIS 101.1 in Melbourne. The show was syndicated in the late drive slot on the KIIS Network following Will & Woody across Australia, and was a station on iHeartRadio.

ARN terminated the contract with Jackie O and gave written notice to Sandilands stating that his behaviour during the show on 20 February 2026 is an act of serious misconduct and therefore a breach of his contract with ARN. Sandilands' contract was subsequently terminated.

== History ==
Kyle and Jackie O were cohosts on the Hot30 Countdown since mid-2000, and presented this show until the end of 2003. In 2004, The Kyle and Jackie O Show commenced as their own show during the drive time slot for Sydney and Melbourne listeners only. They moved to the breakfast time slot on 16 January 2005 for Sydney listeners only, replacing 2Day FM breakfast hosts Judith Lucy, Peter Helliar and Kaz Cooke.

The show has been Sydney's top-rated FM radio breakfast show for four consecutive years, and the program is a 9-time winner and 36-time finalist of the Australian Commercial Radio Awards. From November 2009 until December 2011, Kyle and Jackie O were also broadcast nationally on Saturdays between 3 p.m. and 7 p.m. during the syndicated Take 40 Australia show.

On 1 November 2013, it was announced the radio show will end on 2Day FM in December 2013 and move to rival station, KIIS 106.5 from January 2014.

The Kyle and Jackie O Show began on new station KIIS 106.5 on 20 January 2014 with a nightly "best bits" program networked on the KIIS Network (ARN) and regional radio stations. The show on KIIS 106.5 instantly went to number 1 in the first radio survey for 2014 with the former radio station 2Day FM failing in the ratings.

In 2014, Kyle and Jackie O started a new show, The A-List with Kyle and Jackie O which also airs on KIIS 106.5, in Sydney, and exported globally. A weekly three-hour entertainment show featuring the biggest stars and the hottest music in the world, co-produced with Bowserland.

Together, the radio show won a total of 36 radio awards.

In November 2023, Kyle and Jackie O announced that the show would be networked into Melbourne breakfast on KIIS 101.1 replacing Jase & Lauren from January 2024. They also announced that they had signed a landmark deal with ARN. In March 2024, it was confirmed that Kyle and Jackie O would launch into Melbourne on 29 April.

In February 2026, Sandilands questioned Jackie's work ethic live on air, with Jackie O leaving radio for an unspecified period of time. Jackie O claimed it was "hurtful", stated "If you don't think I'm doing my job well, and don't think I've very good, get someone else" and reportedly took a week of leave. Sandilands stated "...I'm not married to you, I don't have to buy into all this backwards and forwards...". The incident came in the last week of the radio ratings survey, leading to accusations the incident was "a desperate attempt to get PR".

In March 2026, Sandilands was suspended from KIIS FM for two weeks for bad behaviour, and Jackie O's contract with the network was terminated by parent company ARN. Subsequently Jackie O said she did not quit and Sandilands made a public statement saying he wanted the suspension lifted so he could go back on air. On 18 March 2026, ARN announced it had terminated Sandilands' contract. In addition, a campaign by protest group "Mad Fucking Witches" targeting advertisers to boycott the show (based on the behaviour of Kyle Sandilands) had made it harder for the KIIS Network to generate the advertising revenue required for Sandilands' and Hendersons' salaries.

On 4 March 2026, KIIS Breakfast replaced Kyle and Jackie O for the breakfast slot with their "Hour of Power" slot being replaced with more music.

In September the show was replaced with one hosted by Bondi Vet star Chris Brown, KIIS fill-in host Amy Gerard and former Nova broadcaster Jack Charles, it will commence broadcasting from 9 November.

== Time ==
The Kyle and Jackie O Show aired weekdays in the breakfast radio time-slot from 6:00 am to 10:00 am on KIIS 106.5 (Sydney), KIIS DAB+ Perth and KIIS 101.1 (Melbourne).

The syndicated show, The Kyle and Jackie O Hour of Power, aired in metro markets from 6:00 pm to 7:00 pm each weeknight on the KIIS Network in Sydney, Brisbane, Adelaide, Melbourne and Perth, plus in regional areas on a number of FM stations on the Ace Radio and Super Radio networks.

== Regular features ==
=== Jackie's O News ===
Presented every hour, Jackie's O News featured Jackie delivering the morning's celebrity gossip and news. Due to the popularity and longevity of this feature, Jackie's O News would often "break" local and international celebrity news stories.

The segment had also been trusted with pre-determined stories, such as the nominees for the Gold Logie, though in contrast, it had also spoiled television programming and other media, including a character's death in Packed to the Rafters before the episode's airing.

=== The $10,000 Pop Quiz ===
Every morning at 7:00 am a listener was selected to answer 10 questions correctly within 60 seconds. The listener won $100 for each correct answer, but was eligible for the top prize only if all ten were answered correctly. Late in 2012, the $10,000 Pop Quiz eventually changed format to become the $50,000 Pop Quiz every weekday, which was won on 26 November 2012. The Pop Quiz varied from $5000, $10,000, $12,000, $15,000 or $20,000

For the first three years at KIIS, the Pop Quiz was played at 8:00 am. In its history, the Pop Quiz gave away in excess of $1 million, making it Sydney's "richest" cash radio contest.

=== Power Pick ===
Every morning at 6:30 am, a listener who was celebrating their birthday received a prize, which was determined spinning the "Birthday Wheel". This was originally a small wooden wheel, but in January 2011 a new wheel was commissioned that includes hundreds of LED lights. The listener then picks a song to be played on-air. The listener had the choice of Brooklyn or Kyle and Jackie O's song

=== First Calls & Last Calls ===
Every weekday morning at 6:20 am and 9:50 am, listeners could call to talk about anything directly with Kyle and Jackie O.

== Other games and segments ==
=== Tradie vs. Lady ===
Played every morning just after 6:00 am, two listeners phoned in, a male who would represent the tradies, and a female who would represent the ladies. The callers were asked 3 questions each; the tradie was asked lady questions, and the lady was asked tradie questions.

=== What's in Jackie's Mouth? ===
Every Friday, Jackie placed an item in her mouth. Listeners were given clues with sexual innuendo and were asked to assume what the object is. The listener who correctly identified the object won a prize, usually concert tickets. This game alternated between others.

=== 5-in-10 ===
Listeners phoned in to play 5-in-10. The team gave out a broad category and listeners had to identify five specific items of that area in ten seconds. This game alternated between others.

=== Google Predicts ===
Jackie played on behalf of a caller. Kyle gave the first half of a sentence from Google, and Jackie had to correctly guess the top search.

=== ABC's ===
Jackie would ask listeners questions, but they had to answer with a specific letter of the alphabet. Listeners had 12.5 seconds to answer all five questions.

=== Who Do You Believe ===
Kyle and Jackie were each told of a separate item that they had to convince the listener is in the studio. Only one item was in studio, whilst the other had to lie. If the listener correctly guesses who was telling the truth about the actual item that was in the studio they won.

=== Only Lying ===
A listener had to try to convince a friend/relative that the lie they were telling is truthful, before Kyle & Jackie end the call by saying, "Only Lying" before it went too far. That listener would then be rewarded with $1,000.

=== Gibberish ===
Based on the infamous game on Instagram, two listeners called up, and Jackie & Brooklyn played on the callers behalf. Kyle would give the phrase/sentence that is in gibberish, and Jackie and Brooklyn had to correctly identify what the phrase/sentence was actually saying.

=== 2Q's for 20K ===
Listener called up and Jackie & Kyle played on behalf of the caller. Jackie was placed with the listener in the Cone of Silence first, to which Brooklyn gave the two words. Kyle named the first thing that comes to mind relating to those two words, then he went into the cone of silence and Jackie came out with the listener who did the same. If both Kyle and Jackie's answers ended up matching, then that listener won $20,000.

== Ratings ==
Since July 2018, The Kyle and Jackie O Show recorded the largest audience among Sydney breakfast FM shows in every radio survey. As of September 2021, the show had a 10.7% market share of the total Sydney breakfast time slot. In the period April–June 2021 the show recorded the largest audience across all Sydney breakfast shows (AM/FM) with a market share of 15.5%, their highest result. Host Kyle Sandilands attributed the show's rating success in part to his and Jackie O's tendency to say what they were thinking, "even if [we're] not sure".

The syndicated Kyle and Jackie O Show: Hour of Power aired nationally on various regional radio stations, reaching 5.3 million Australians on the KIIS Network and an additional 6.4 million Australians on Ace Radio's regional stations. Kyle and Jackie O's global show, Alist with Kyle and Jackie O, co-produced with Bowserland attracted an audience of more than 1.2 million listeners from radio stations in Australia and across the globe. After the show commenced in the Sydney breakfast market in January 2005, it needed only 12 months to claim the top spot in the FM ratings.

In November 2023, it was revealed the pair had signed a 10-year, A$200 million deal, a record for the Australian market; in other words, Kyle and Jackie O would each get a base salary of $10 million, plus bonus total stock options valued at $14 million. The pair also negotiated a clause that allows them to broadcast to anywhere on earth; with the show being syndicated in the Melbourne market, leading to the cancellation of the Jase & Lauren show by the end of 2023. This programming change did not perform well; with 140,000 listeners lost in Melbourne's KIIS breakfast show compared to the previous year six months in. In the final ratings for 2024, the show finished 6th place in Melbourne with a market share of 5 per cent while remaining the top spot in Sydney with 13.5 per cent. This poor performance was attributed to Sandilands' hubris and the show's sexualised nature.

In 2026, The Kyle and Jackie O Show received its lowest position in the ratings since its launch in Melbourne in 2024.

== Complaints ==
The Kyle and Jackie O Show had been heard discussing not only discussing sexual acts in detail, but also describing women as 'dogs' based on their appearance. The protest group "Mad Fucking Witches" launched a campaign pressuring advertisers to cease their advertising on the show, claiming it was misogynistic. While the network acknowledged the show is controversial, they claimed it is also what intrigued people to tune in. During a separate interview, the company's content director also conceded the show was over-sexualised and Sandilands had been asked to tone it down.

In August 2009, Kyle and Jackie O were suspended following a segment in which they put a 14-year-old girl on a lie detector and then asked her about her sexual history. After the girl revealed that she had been a victim of rape, Sandilands asked "Right ... is that the only experience you've had?" Following this incident, a full-time censor was brought on board. Despite the suspension and scandal, Kyle and Jackie O maintained their number-one position in the market, and the show actually grew 0.6 percentage points.

In September 2009, Sandilands apologised after making an on-air remark about how actor Magda Szubanski could lose a lot more weight if she had spent time in a concentration camp. Although Szubanski indicated that it was a "beat-up" and that she "couldn't care less", Sandilands was suspended following the incident.

In July 2011, Sandilands made headlines after stating that Australian model Megan Gale was a "phony" and that he "never liked her". Gale's management responded by cancelling Gale's upcoming interview on the show. Later that week, model Charlotte Dawson hit out at Sandilands on her Twitter account, saying that he could "f*** off".

In August 2011, Sandilands faced criticism from the Indian community over comments he made on the show about the cleanliness of the Ganges River. The Universal Society of Hinduism later admitted that there was no malice behind Sandilands's comments and accepted his reasoning.

In November 2011, Sandilands used his radio show to launch abuse at Daily Telegraph columnist Alison Henderson, for her negative review of the Kyle & Jackie O TV show (which had performed poorly in the ratings). Sandilands called Henderson a "fat slag" and a "piece of shit", accused the columnist of bias because "she just hates us and has always hated us", before making more derogatory comments about her body. The ACMA investigation into the show imposed further restrictions on 2DayFM, meaning that the radio station would be in breach if any broadcast made statements to demean women or girls.

In May 2016, legal action was launched against Jackie O and the Australian Radio Network, after Jackie O questioned the parentage of NRL player Kieran Foran's son on air. Jackie O made the claim in late April, after it was revealed that Foran had checked into a mental health clinic, and had been granted indefinite leave from his club. Rugby league writer, Danny Weidler responded at the time "The suggestion from Jackie O on Kiis1065 that Kieran Foran's baby boy is not his is false and offensive to all concerned". The legal demand instructed the show to make a full retraction of the defamatory allegation against Foran and his ex-partner, and issue an unreserved apology.

In September 2024, the show was criticised by the ABC's Media Watch for recording people on the toilet urinating and forcing the presenters to guess who made the noise.

In July 2025, the duo faced potential contempt of court charges after making on-air remarks about Erin Patterson during her murder trial. Henderson commented that Patterson's case was "not strong" and Sandilands added that authorities should "lock the bitch up." The charges were ultimately dropped.

== The team ==
The Kyle and Jackie O Show had a total of five content producers and two audio producers.

The show was overseen by KIIS 106.5's Head of Content (and formerly the show's Executive Producer), Derek "DB" Bargwanna.

According to Media Week Australia, The Kyle and Jackie O Show's content production team was one of Australia's most formidable production teams.

The show's producers reportedly worked 12 hours a day or more in order to keep the show's ratings at number 1.

Name	Nickname	Role	Start	Notes
Kyle Sandilands	King Kyle	Host, anchor, and panel operator of the show	January 2005	
Jackie O Henderson	Jackie O	Host of the show and presents "O News"	January 2005	
Derek Bargwanna	DB	Head of KIIS Network	August 2000	Previously was KIIS 106.5 & KIIS 101.1 Head of Content. He has been the show's content director since August 2000 and was the show's executive producer.
Bruno Bouchet		Show Director	January 2024	
Brooklyn Ross		Newsreader	January 2015	
Nat Penfold	Croat Nat	Executive Producer	January 2023	Previously Producer; Became Executive Producer in August 2024
Peter Deppeler	Intern Pete	Intern	December 2013	KIIS National Talent Manager
Jaimee Hassos	Mayo	Senior Producer & Guest Booker	June 2018	
Louisa Senteleky	School Teacher	Producer	March 2023	
Ella Kanna	Lingus	Digital Content Producer	March 2021	
Alfie Laguzza	Alfie The Gronk	Content Assistant	June 2023	
Zane Dean	Thing	Sydney Studio Producer	April 2022	
Dan Atkinson		Digital Content Producer	June 2025	
Dean Johnston	Hulk	Audio Producer	~2024	
Missy Balfour	The Censor	On Air Content Advisor	June 2014	Previously 2Day FM (January 2012 – December 2013)
Phuong Bui	Kung-phuey	Assistant Censor		
Cooper Johns		Talent & Fill In for Sandilands	January 2024	

== Former team/producers ==
Name	Nickname	Role	Start	End	Notes
Joshua Fox	Yeah But Nah	Video Producer	Nov 2022–Oct 2024		
Nikita McGoram	The Ukrainian	Assistant Censor	2023–2024		
Lachlan Mansell	Lachy The Geek Virgin Lachie Lachie the Virgin	Melbourne Studio Producer	April 2024	May 2025	Previously was a Junior Producer from August 2021 – August 2022 and workday announcer on Power FM in Ballarat. He won Beauty and the Geek in 2021.
Pedro Cuccovillo Vitola	Cuzzy Pedro the Anivaxxer	Content Producer _{October 2016 - May 2019} _{July 2020 - January 2023} _{August - October 2024} Executive Producer _{January 2023 - August 2024}	(1) October 2016 (2) July 2020	(1) May 2019 (2) October 2024	Content Producer from October 2016 - May 2019 until his resignation. Returned to the show in July 2020, and was promoted to Executive Producer in January 2023. He stepped down from the Executive Producer role in August 2024.
Sonia Jahshan	Palestine	Executive Producer	January 2019	December 2022	Currently a Senior Producer on Sunrise on Seven Network.
Tom Whitaker	Snappy Tom	Producer	January 2019	February 2023	
Patrick Rice	P.A.T	Audio Producer	June 2019	December 2022	
Adam Price	Shivering Adam	Studio Producer	March 2017	April 2022	
Mitchell Coombs	Meek Mitch	Video Producer	March 2018	May 2021	
Bruno Bouchet		Executive Producer	January 2016	December 2018	
Simon Greally	Simon	Executive Producer	January 2014	December 2014	
Nick Cervetto	Pretty	Show Manager	May 2011	April 2014	
Tiasha Debray	Felicia Herzog	Web Producer	July 2020	March 2022	
Che Gadenne	Pinch the baby	Executive Producer	January 2006	January 2007	
Jermaine D’Vauz	Brown	Video Producer	June 2021	September 2022	
Kian Oliver	Black Bieber	Audio Producer	January 2018	March 2022	
John Nicholson	John’s Nuts and Coffee	Show Barista and fill-in Phone Operator	January 2017	June 2022	
James Weir	ABC	Entertainment Producer	January 2014	December 2014	
Krista Thomas		Newsreader	December 2013	December 2014	
Daniel Bozykowski	Boz The Junkie	Audio Producer	January 2014	December 2014	Audio Producer for KIIS 106.5 Sydney. Currently KIIS Image Production Manager – KIIS 106.5 Sydney and KIIS 101.1 Melbourne.
Alisson Longhurst	Hamburglar	Senior Producer	January 2014	February 2015	
Ben Harlum	Chuck Chuck Chuckie	Senior Producer	February 2015	June 2015	Previously Australian Radio Network's Social Media Specialist, starting in 2014.
Andy Ruzgar	Monotone Andy	Entertainment Producer	January 2015	May 2015	
Krystal Sanders	Colonel Sanders	Producer	2016	August 2017	
Laura Cosgrove	Blunt	Entertainment Producer	July 2015	December 2015	
Rhys Messenger	Who's That Rhys?	Senior Imaging Producer	January 2018	June 2019	
Olivia Mackinnon	Single White Female	Senior Digital Content Producer	2014	February 2018	
Bern Sokol	Reception Bern	Social Media Producer	February 2015	December 2015	
Jamie Travers		Creative Content Producer	January 2016	March 2016	
Whitney Plowman		Producer	April 2016	July 2016	
Nic McClure		Executive Producer	January 2015	December 2016	
Oscar Gordon	Oscar IT	Executive Digital Content Producer	October 2014	December 2016	
Abigail Benaud	Wednesday	Senior Producer (Guests and Talent Producer)	November 2013	February 2017	
Luke James	Manchild	Panel Op/Producer	November 2013	January 2017	Previously was Executive Producer for Jase & Lauren on KIIS 101.1.
Daniel Hunt	ISIS	Audio Producer	January 2016	December 2017	
David Faires	Garfield	Audio Producer	January 2014	December 2017	
Rohan Edwards	Rohan the Ruiner	Panel Op	January 2017	March 2017	
Olivia Esveld	Hot Liv	Web Producer	February 2018	June 2020	
Ashleigh Smith	Awkward Ash	Producer	April 2019	October 2020	
Geoff Field		Newsreader	2003	2010	From 2Day FM

== Fill-in hosts ==
=== 2Day FM ===
- Andrew Günsberg
- Brian McFadden
- Charli Robinson
- Chris Page
- Daniel "Mandy" Cassin
- Dannii Minogue
- Didier Cohen
- Fifi Box
- George Houvardas
- Hamish & Andy
- Hugh Sheridan
- Jules Lund
- Matty Acton
- Lara Bingle
- Matt Preston
- Mel B
- Pete Timbs
- Sophie Monk

=== KIIS 106.5 ===
- Brooklyn Ross
- Zoe Marshall
- Sophie Monk
- Beau Ryan
- Mitch Churi
- Nat Penfold
- Martha Kalifatidis
- Sonia Jahshan
- Brittney Hockley

== Notable celebrity guests ==
KIIS FM confirmed media reports in April 2016 that the program, on occasion, compensates celebrities for appearing on the program.

- Adam Sandler
- Andy Cohen
- Angelina Jolie
- Whackhead Simpson
- Ben Stiller
- Beyoncé
- Brad Pitt
- Cameron Diaz
- Chris Brown
- Chris Rock
- Dannii Minogue
- Dolly Parton
- Dr Phil McGraw
- Elton John
- Eva Longoria
- Flavor Flav
- Hugh Jackman
- Jack Black
- James Franco
- Jay-Z
- Jennifer Aniston
- Jennifer Lopez
- Jessica Alba
- John Travolta
- Jon Bon Jovi
- Josh Duhamel
- Jude Law
- Justin Bieber
- Justin Timberlake
- Kate Hudson
- Katherine Heigl
- Khloé Kardashian
- Kim Kardashian
- Kit Harington
- Kris Jenner
- Kristen Stewart
- Lady Gaga
- Leonardo DiCaprio
- Mark Wahlberg
- Morgan Freeman
- Natalie Portman
- Nicole Kidman
- Nicole Scherzinger
- Nicki Minaj
- Oprah
- Reese Witherspoon
- Rob Lowe
- Robert Downey Jr.
- Robert Pattinson
- Ryan Seacrest
- Sacha Baron Cohen
- Sarah Jessica Parker
- Taylor Swift
- The Kid Laroi
- Teri Hatcher
- Will Smith
- Zac Efron

== Australian Commercial Radio Awards ==
Since 2004, The Kyle & Jackie O Show had been a 36-time finalist and a 9-time winner of the Australian Commercial Radio Awards.

Year	Nominee / work	Award	Result
2004	Molly Meldrum Telephone Scam	Best Comedy Segment	Won
2004	The Kyle and Jackie O Show	Best On-Air Team	Nominated
2004	Live from the ARIAs 2003	Best Music Special	Nominated
2005	The Kyle and Jackie O Show	Best Networked Program	Nominated
2005	The Kyle and Jackie O Show	Best On-Air Team	Nominated
2005	Geoff Field	Best News Presenter	Nominated
2006	The Kyle and Jackie O Show	Best Networked Program	Nominated
2006	The Kyle and Jackie O Show	Best on Air Team	Won
2006	Sydney's First Illegal Gay Wedding	Best Station Promotion	Nominated
2007	The Kyle and Jackie O Show	Best On-Air Team	Won
2007	Derek Bargwanna	Best Show Producer	Won
2007	Kyle and Jackie O Boost Your Life	Best Station Promotion	Won
2007	Geoff Field	Best News Presenter	Nominated
2007	Kyle and Jackie O's Hour of Power with Robbie Williams	Best Music Special	Nominated
2007	The Kyle and Jackie O Show	Best Networked Program	Nominated
2007	Kyle and Jackie O's Hour of No Power	Best Community Service Project	Nominated
2008	The Kyle and Jackie O Show	Best On-Air Team	Nominated
2008	Geoff Field	Best News Presenter	Nominated
2008	Ten Things I Hate About You	Best Music Special	Nominated
2008	Kyle and Jackie O's Nude Wedding	Best Station Promotion	Nominated
2008	The Kyle and Jackie O Show	Best Networked Program	Nominated
2008	Kyle and Jackie O's Priscilla with the Stars	Best Sales Promotion	Nominated
2009	The Kyle and Jackie O Show	Best On-Air Team	Nominated
2009	The Kyle and Jackie O Show	Best Networked Program	Nominated
2009	Kyle and Jackie O's Heartless Hotline	Best Station Promotion	Nominated
2009	Pink Meet and Greet	Best Music Special	Nominated
2009	Geoff Field	Best News Presenter	Nominated
2010	The Kyle and Jackie O Show	Best On-Air Team	Nominated
2010	Sarah McGilvray	Best Show Producer	Nominated
2010	Dinner with Kyle, Jackie O and Chris Noth	Best Station Promotion	Nominated
2011	Sophie Monk	Best Newcomer Off-Air	Nominated
2011	Gemma O'Neill	Best Show Producer	Won
2011	Derek Bargwanna	Best Program Director	Won
2011	Dan Bozykowski	Best Achievement in Production	Nominated
2011	The Kyle and Jackie O Show	Best On-Air Team	Won
2012	The Kyle and Jackie O Show	Best On-Air Team	Nominated
2013	The Kyle and Jackie O Show	Best On-Air Team	Won
2014	The Kyle and Jackie O Show	Best On-Air Team	Nominated
2014	Derek Bargwanna	Best Program Director	Won
2015	The Kyle and Jackie O Show	Best On-Air Team	Won
2015	Kyle and Jack Give Back Wedding	Best Station Promotion	Won
2016	Nic McClure	Best Show Producer	Won
2016	The Kyle and Jackie O Show	Best Multimedia Execution – Sales	Won
2017	The Kyle and Jackie O Show	Best Multimedia Execution – Sales	Won
2017	The Kyle and Jackie O Show	Best Community Service Project	Won
2017	Bruno Bouchet	Best Show Producer	Won
2017	The Kyle and Jackie O Show	Best Networked Program	Won
2018	The Kyle and Jackie O Show	Best Multimedia Execution – Sales	Won
2018	The Kyle and Jackie O Show	Best Marketing Campaign	Won
2018	The Kyle and Jackie O Show	Best On-Air Team – FM	Won
2020/21	The Kyle and Jackie O Show	Best On-Air Team – FM	Won
2020/21	Jackie Henderson	Best Entertainment Presenter	Won
2020/21	The Kyle and Jackie O Show	Best Multimedia Execution – Station	Won
2020/21	The Kyle and Jackie O Show	Best Multimedia Execution – Sales	Won
2020/21	The Kyle and Jackie O Show	Best Station Promotion	Won
2020/21	The Kyle and Jackie O Show	Best Sales Promotion	Won
2020/21	Sonia Jahshan	Best Show Producer	Won

== Bibliography ==
=== Contributor ===
- Kyle and Jackie O (2007). "Contributor". Laugh Even Louder!. By Camp Quality. Gosford, New South Wales: Scholastic Australia. ISBN 978-1-74169-022-4.

== See also ==
- Australia's Got Talent
- Big Brother Australia
- Take 40 Australia
- The X Factor
