= Will & Woody =

Australian radio show

- Genre: Comedy
- Running time: 120 minutes (4:00 pm – 6:00 pm)
- Home station: KIIS 101.1 Melbourne
- Syndicates: Gold 96FM Perth (7 - 9pm); KIIS DAB+ Perth; KIIS 97.3 Brisbane; KIIS 106.5 Sydney; KIIS 102.3 Adelaide
- Hosted by: Will McMahon; Woody Whitelaw
- Executive producer: Ed Kirkwood
- Original release: 8 January 2018
- Audio format: Stereo
- Website: willandwoody.com

Will & Woody is a syndicated Australian radio show hosted by Will McMahon and Woody Whitelaw across the KIIS Network and Super Radio Network. The show in its current form first aired on the KIIS Network on 18 January 2018.

The pair first met during their school years at Scotch College in Melbourne.

== History ==
=== Hit Network ===
McMahon and Whitelaw have hosted radio shows together since 2011, after being spotted by broadcaster Steve Vizard after performing at a law school revue in Melbourne. The pair were recruited as fill-in presenters for The Kyle & Jackie O Show, and were later heard nationally on the Today Network.

In October 2013, Southern Cross Austereo announced that McMahon and Whitelaw will host 92.9 Perth's breakfast radio program, alongside Heidi Anderson. In addition to their Perth shows, the pair were also heard on Fox FM Melbourne's Saturday breakfast program, between January and August 2017.

In August 2017, McMahon and Whitelaw departed Hit92.9 and its parent company, Southern Cross Austereo.

=== KIIS Network ===
In October 2017, Australian Radio Network announced the pair would move to Melbourne to succeed the Hughesy & Kate drive show on the KIIS Network, commencing 8 January 2018. In February 2020, Australian Radio Network announced it had extended McMahon and Whitelaw's contract for three years.

In May 2022, the duo appeared as contestants on the sixth season of The Celebrity Apprentice Australia. The duo placed 10th in the season, however still raised $20,000 for their chosen charity.

In June 2022, it was announced that Ash London will fill in for Will McMahon whilst he's on paternity leave.

From June 2022, the duo are the sideline commentators for Australian Ninja Warrior’s sixth season.

In January 2023, ARN announced that the show will be syndicated on the Super Radio Network to 16 additional radio stations across regional New South Wales, Queensland and the Northern Territory.

In April 2023, Brooke Boney filled in for Woody Whitelaw whilst he competed in I'm a Celebrity...Get Me Out of Here!.

In January 2026, ARN announced that Sophie Monk will fill in for Will McMahon for a few weeks whilst he is on paternity leave.

In September 2026, ARN announced that the show would not be renewed into 2027, with the show coming to an end at the end of 2026.
