= MFW =

MFW may refer to:

- M&F Worldwide, traded on the NYSE using the code MFW
- Mad Fucking Witches, an Australian advocacy group
- Märkische-Flugzeugwerke (MFW), a German aircraft manufacturer of World War One, see Rumpler C.I
- Miami–Fort Lauderdale–West Palm Beach metropolitan area
- Milan Fashion Week
- "My Face When", in SMS language
