= Cathy O'Connor =

Australian media executive

- Occupation: media executive

Cathy O'Connor is an Australian media executive.

== Career ==
Her radio career began in 1985, when she worked as a sales manager for Sydney radio stations 2GB and 2SM, before moving on to Austereo in the 1990s where she held a number executive positions including Agency Sales Manager, General Sales Manager and General Manager.

Since 2006, O'Connor has served on the board at Commercial Radio Australia, of which she was chairperson from 2009 until 2012.

She joined Nova Entertainment as Managing Director in January 2003, when the company was known as DMG Radio. O'Connor was the Chief Executive Officer of Nova Entertainment, between 2008 - 2020.

In August 2020, it was announced that O'Connor would leave Nova Entertainment to join oOh!media as Chief Executive Officer. In December 2024, O'Connor decided to make 10% of the company's headcount redundant to save costs amidst a restructure to preserve her role. Despite this, in April 2025, O'Connor announced she would be leaving the company in the second half of the year.

When ABC Television program Media Watch exposed fake vox pops on Vega news bulletins, which were recorded at the radio station with staff instead of in public with everyday people, O'Connor, as managing director of DMG Radio, brushed the incident off. O'Connor described it as "an isolated case of lazy journalism" and said there was a "clear distinction" between their fake vox pops and the fake listener interactions with bogus callers on rival station 2Day FM. Media Watch presenter Monica Attard disagreed.

O'Connor is a governor at the Cerebral Palsy Foundation and in 2017 was appointed as a director at the Sony Foundation. In 2014, she took the Ice Bucket Challenge.

== Awards and honours ==
In 2015, Australian media and marketing magazine B&T named O'Connor as the 19th most powerful woman in Australian media. At the 2016 Australian Commercial Radio Awards, O'Connor was inducted into the Hall of Fame in recognition of her 31 years working in the industry.
