= Mad Fucking Witches =

Australian activist group

Logo of Mad Fucking Witches

Mad Fucking Witches (MFW) are an Australian online-based advocacy group who have organised campaigns against people and organisations they accuse of spreading misogyny or racism. Named after a comment Peter Dutton made towards a journalist, Jennie Hill created the group in 2016 with its first significant campaign launched in 2019 against Alan Jones.

== History ==
On 17 March 2025, The Project broadcast a segment about the group. The Project's female co-host, Sarah Harris, was the most outspoken detractor of the MFW interview.

=== Alan Jones ===
In response to comments Alan Jones broadcast to "shove a sock down the throat" of New Zealand prime minister Jacinda Ardern in addition to her being "backhanded" in August 2019. With the activism group Sleeping Giants, MFW engaged its followers to target their fury at advertisers of Jones's show. In three days, 441 ad spots were lost with the producer 2GB. In May 2020, Jones wrapped up his radio career with 2GB while continuing work with Sky News Australia.

=== Kyle & Jackie O ===
With the launch of The Kyle and Jackie O Show into Melbourne in May 2024, a campaign was started targeting advertisers to boycott the show based on the behaviour of Kyle Sandilands. With the hashtag #VileKyle based upon the overly sexualised nature of the show, the campaign aimed to prevent the normalisation of violent misogyny. Six months after the Melbourne launch, 140,000 listeners had been lost year on year, ending 2024 ranking sixth place with a five percent market share.

MFW made it harder for the KIIS Network to generate the advertising revenue required for Sandilands' and Hendersons' salaries.
