= Kyle Sandilands =

Australian radio and television personality (born 1971)

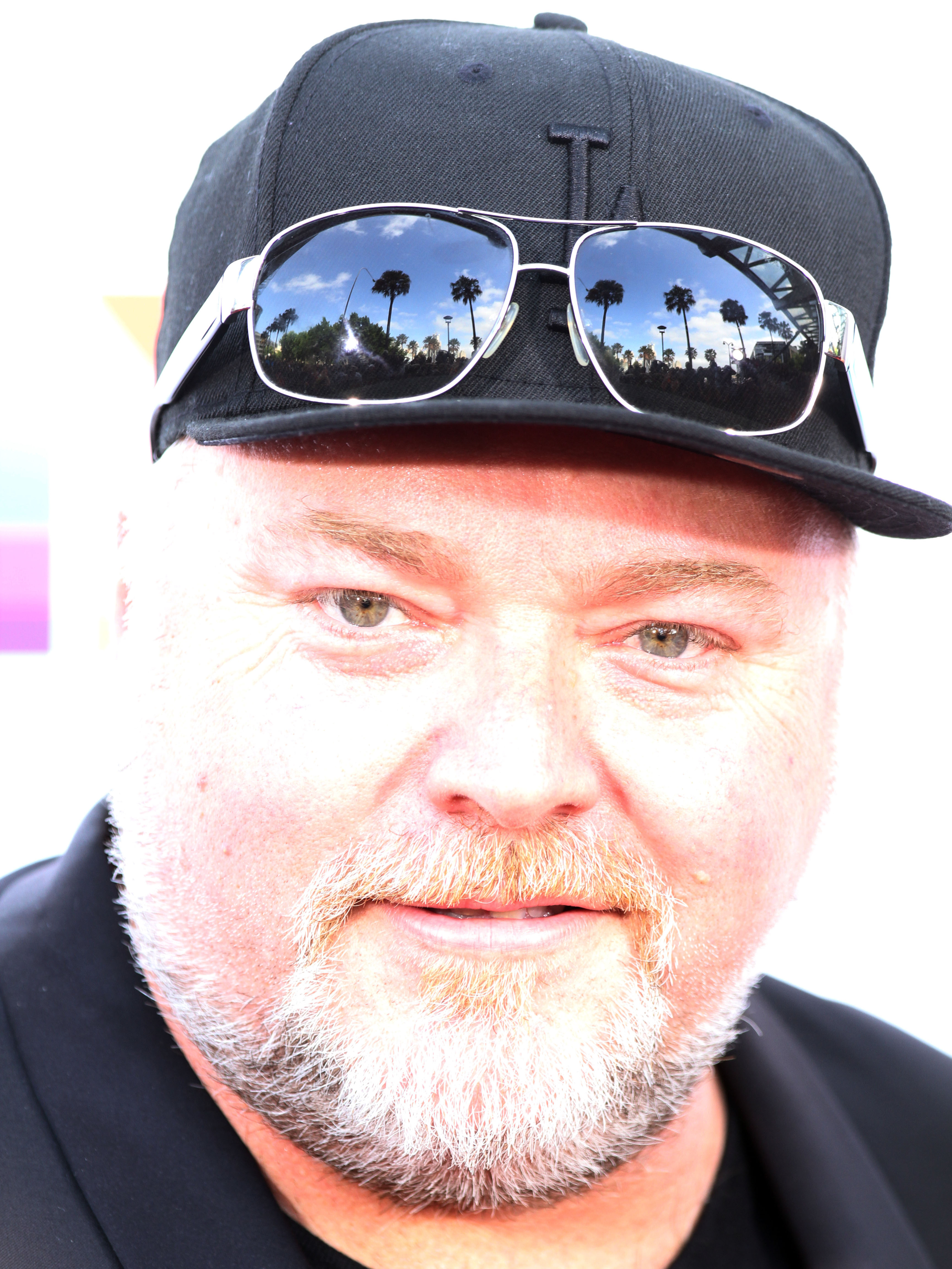
- Sandilands at the ARIA Music Awards of 2014
- Born: Kyle Dalton Sandilands; 10 June 1971 (age 55); Brisbane, Queensland, Australia
- Occupations: Radio and television host
- Years active: 1992−present
- Spouses: Tamara Jaber (m. 2008–2010) Tegan Kynaston (m. 2023)
- Children: 1
- Presenting career
- Show: The Kyle and Jackie O Show; The Kyle and Jackie O Hour of Power
- Stations: 2Day FM, KIIS 106.5, Mix 101.1, Fox FM (Melbourne)
- Show: Australian Idol
- Style: Radio and television host, shock jock
- Previous shows: Big Brother, The X Factor, Australia's Got Talent
- Website: kingkyle.com

Kyle Dalton Sandilands (born 10 June 1971) is an Australian radio host, shock jock and television personality. Together with Jackie O, they co-hosted the weekday breakfast radio program The Kyle and Jackie O Show from 2005 until 2026, first on Sydney's 2Day FM and then on radio station KIIS 106.5. As of 2026, Sandilands operates an independent show called Kyle Sandilands Live.

Sandilands has become known for controversial on-air stunts and offensive comments. This has led to companies removing their advertisements, findings of serious breaches of the Industry Codes of Practice and Guidelines, and to his firing from Australian Idol.

From 2005 to 2009, and from 2023 to 2026, Sandilands served as a judge on Australian Idol. In 2008, he became the host of Big Brother, alongside Jackie O. In 2010, he became a judge on Australia's Got Talent and also on Australia's version of The X Factor.

== Early life ==
On various occasions, including in the Enough Rope interview, Sandilands has spoken to the media of his difficult childhood. Growing up in Wynnum, Brisbane, he was devastated by his parents' divorce, which happened when he was ten. At 15, his mother and stepfather threw him out of their house because he wrecked their car. He never went back. At 17, his father sent him to live in Townsville with his aunt, Jill Stevens. Interviewed in 2005, Stevens recalled for The Sydney Morning Herald that the young Sandilands:

used to listen to that Tammy Wynette song D-I-V-O-R-C-E and just cry and cry. He's never gotten over his parents' divorce... When he was living on the streets, he used to sit outside his father's house at night and watch the lights go out.

== Career ==
=== Radio ===
Sandilands landed his first radio job in 1992, at the age of 21, at 4TO Townsville, where he was employed to drive the station's promotional vehicle. Within weeks he had declared his willingness to do whatever it took to get ahead: to work anywhere, in any time slot. He took gigs in Cairns, and then Darwin, before joining Austereo's Triple M in Brisbane after using a false resumé to impress one of the station's executives. In 1999, he moved to Sydney and commenced at 2Day FM as host of the Hot30 Countdown, replacing "Ugly Phil O'Neil", a former husband of Jacqueline Henderson (Jackie O). Sandilands attributes his radio career taking off to being told by then Group Program Director Jeff Allis to "do whatever you want, just win". Sandilands was paid $255,000 per year while working on the Hot30 Countdown.

Much media coverage of Sandilands has focused on the negative aspects of his personality and behaviour, notably his widely publicised clashes with and criticism of other media figures, his intemperate on-air outbursts and his alleged "out-of-control" ego. In September 2006, Sandilands was named the most hated Australian identity in a Zoo Weekly article, although on 14 October 2006, Sandilands and Henderson were named "Best On-Air Team" at the Australian Commercial Radio Awards. Sandilands and Jackie O were again named "Best On-Air Team" at the Australian Commercial Radio Awards in 2007, 2011, and 2015.

In August 2009, The Kyle and Jackie O Show was put into "indefinite recess" by the Austereo network as a result of a controversial on-air stunt on his morning show on 29 July 2009. He returned to his radio show on 18 August 2009 but was suspended on 9 September 2009 due to on-air comments relating to Magda Szubanski. In the same year, he was again named the most hated by Zoo Weekly. Sandilands and Henderson were the hosts of the nationally syndicated chart show The Hot Hits, before swapping host roles with Andrew Günsberg in December 2009, who had previously hosted Take40 Australia, but left the show at the end of 2011.

In November 2023, it was revealed that Sandilands and Jackie O had signed a 10-year, A$200 million deal, a record for the Australian market; in other words, Kyle and Jackie O would each get a base salary of $10 million, plus bonus total stock options valued at $14 million. The pair also negotiated a clause that allows them to broadcast from anywhere on earth; additionally, the show was to be syndicated in the Melbourne market, leading to the cancellation of the Jase & Lauren show by the end of 2023.

==== Suspension ====
In March 2026, Sandilands was suspended from KIIS FM by parent company ARN for two weeks over remarks he made on 20 February towards co-host Jackie O, causing a rift between the two. According to employer ARN, Jackie O subsequently said she could not work with Sandilands, but later said she did not quit.

Several days later, Sandilands released a statement saying: "ARN terminated Jackie's contract on the same day it accused me of a breach," and asking to be reinstated to the program. On 18 March 2026, ARN announced it had terminated Sandilands' contract. In addition, a campaign by protest group "Mad Fucking Witches" targeting advertisers to boycott the show had made it harder for the KIIS Network to generate the advertising revenue required for Sandilands' and Hendersons' salaries.

On 23 March, Sandilands filed a legal challenge in the Federal Court against ARN's decision to terminate his contract. On 17 June 2026, Sandilands settled the court case with ARN for nearly $14 million, which included a settlement fee of just over $12 million and advertising services of $1.5 million. The terms also excluded Sandilands from joining a rival radio station until after March 2027. Sandilands is expected to launch an online and podcast media venture.

On 16 June, Sandilands reached a settlement with ARN that prevented further court action. The agreement will see Sandilands paid $12.09 million through monthly instalments until June 2029, ARN will also provide Sandilands with $1.5 million of advertising opportunities.

=== Television ===
==== Australian Idol ====
In 2005, Sandilands replaced Ian "Dicko" Dickson as one of the judges on Network Ten's Australian Idol. He continued as a judge on Idol until, just before the premiere of its seventh season, he was dropped from the show in August 2009. He was involved in a number of controversies relating to remarks to contestants as his stint as a judge. In October 2005, he referred to the eventual 2005 Idol winner Kate DeAraugo's arms as "tuckshop lady arms". In September 2006, Sandilands told 2006 runner-up contestant Jessica Mauboy to lose her "jelly belly". A year later, Sandilands referred to contestant Bobby Flynn as a "mong" – a derogatory slang term for mongoloid, referring to people with Down syndrome. Sandilands claimed that he meant no disrespect to those with Down syndrome. On 3 August 2009, Network Ten issued a press statement announcing that Sandilands had been sacked from Australian Idol, citing the network's view that the Kyle and Jackie O Show's content was incompatible with the family-oriented image of Idol.

In September 2022, Sandilands was announced as a returning judge for the Seven Network's revival of the series for 2023. He rejoined the show as the only judge from the previous iteration of the show, judging alongside former American Idol judge Harry Connick Jr. as well as singers Meghan Trainor and Amy Shark. In late 2023, it was announced that the show had been picked up for a ninth season, set to air in January 2024. It was also announced that Sandilands would be returning as a judge alongside Amy Shark, however, Meghan Trainor and Harry Connick Jr. would not be returning. In October 2023, Seven officially announced that original Australian idol judge Marcia Hines would be returning as a judge in 2024 alongside Sandilands and Shark, with the show going back to its original three judge format. Sandilands quit hosting Australian Idol to shield the Seven Network from a campaign run by Mad Fucking Witches.

==== Big Brother ====
In 2002, Sandilands competed in the only Australian series of Celebrity Big Brother. He finished 3rd on day 23.

On 14 July 2007, two weeks before the season finale, Sandilands appeared on the 2007 Australian season of Big Brother. In an attempt to boost poor ratings and to promote the 2007 season of Australian Idol, Sandilands entered the Gold Coast compound and was due to conduct his radio program in house on that Monday morning. However, after a heated verbal exchange with Big Brother, Sandilands reportedly required anti-nausea injections for migraines and began vomiting every 30 minutes. He left the house soon after. In 2008, Sandilands and Henderson became the hosts of the 2008 season of Big Brother replacing Gretel Killeen. The ratings for the launch of the 2008 series were the lowest in the show's history, and Network Ten ultimately confirmed that it would not continue past the current season.

==== Australia's Got Talent ====
In January 2010, it was announced that Sandilands and Brian McFadden would be the new judges on the fourth season of Australia's Got Talent, replacing former judges Tom Burlinson and Red Symons. During one of the show's auditions, Sandilands was involved in another controversy relating to a contestant on the show. He had asked contestant Heather Cook, "Are you male or female?" When Cook tried to make light of the question, Sandilands then made a joke about her weight, saying, "You're a belly full of laughs". Sandilands added he wasn't hired to be "bland and boring", and that he was just being honest.

==== The X Factor ====
In May 2010, it was announced that Sandilands would become one of the new judges as also the fourth judge on the second season of The X Factor Australia, alongside other new judges Ronan Keating, Guy Sebastian and Natalie Imbruglia who replaced John Reid, Mark Holden and Kate Ceberano. On 16 March 2011, Sandilands announced on his breakfast radio show that he would not be returning as a judge in the third series of The X Factor. He was replaced by Mel B.

==== Meet the Hockers ====
In 2017, Sandilands narrated the reality television program Meet the Hockers, a show similar to Pawn Stars, which he also produced. The series debuted on 9Go! on 16 May 2017, and attracted very low ratings of just 98,000 viewers, being beaten by numerous other multichannel programs in the same timeslot.

==== Trial by Kyle ====
In 2018, Sandilands appeared in a pilot for a possible television series, Trial by Kyle, on Network Ten. The reality show is set in a court room with Sandilands passing judgement across a whole range of real life cases. Helping him analyse the evidence is former The Bachelor Australia contestant and criminal lawyer Anna Heinrich. The pilot proceeded to a series in 2019.

=== Post-radio ===
Following his settlement with ARN in 2026, Sandilands announced that he would launch a subscription breakfast show titled Kyle Sandilands Live on 10 August.

== Controversies ==
In all, Sandilands has been accused of sexism, whitewashing, homophobia, ableism, bullying, slut-shaming and misogyny, and has attracted controversy for broadcasting inflammatory remarks to a large audience as part of his public persona as a shock jock.

In July and August 2005, Sandilands was accused of "cooking the charts" by giving airplay to "Ooh Ahh" (a song by his then-girlfriend, Tamara Jaber). The allegations were made on TV current affairs program Today Tonight. In 2006, Sandilands won a defamation suit, with the court ruling that Today Tonight had defamed the radio host.

On 2 July 2007, Sandilands and Jackie O were involved in an on-air clash with Australian music personality Molly Meldrum, who described Sandilands as "arrogant", "fat" and "talentless".

On 20 August 2007, Media Watch examined Sandilands' on-air comments asserting that smoking was not as harmful to people as many institutions would lead people to believe and that the statistics presented by these institutions are falsified. These comments led to the Cancer Institute of New South Wales pulling their "13-QUIT" advertisements off the network.

=== Enough Rope interview ===
On 22 August 2007, Sandilands was interviewed by Andrew Denton for Enough Rope. During the interview Sandilands said he wanted to "punch Dave Hughes in the throat" next time he saw him. This was in response to Hughes' reference to Sandilands as a "dickhead" on another program. A subsequent article in The Sydney Morning Herald cited unspecified reports which claimed that Sandilands was left in a "hostile state" by Denton's questions about Sandilands' need to take personal responsibility for the results of his actions on air.

=== Lie detector incident and sacking from Network Ten ===
On 29 July 2009, a radio segment involved a distressed teenager who was asked to discuss her sexual history live on air, and in front of her mother. After initially sounding very uncomfortable with the questioning, the girl began crying and said she had been raped when she was 12, and that her mother was already aware of this. Sandilands replied: "Right... is that the only experience you've had?" The stunt was cut short and co-host Jackie O was quick to apologise; however, several of the show's prominent advertisers quickly withdrew sponsorships. In the following days, media commentators, psychologists and rape crisis workers condemned the stunt while expressing deep concern for the well-being of the teenager.

On 3 August 2009, Network Ten issued a press statement announcing that Sandilands had been sacked from Australian Idol, citing the network's view that the Kyle and Jackie O Show's content was incompatible with the family-oriented image of Idol. Guest judges replaced him for the rest of the season. It was also announced that the Kyle and Jackie O Show on 2Day FM and The Kyle and Jackie O Hour of Power would be in recess until a review was completed. A Network Ten spokesman said of Sandilands' firing: "Idol has remained a family-focused show, even more so this year with the 6.30pm Sunday timeslot. His radio persona has taken on a more controversial position... which is not in the interest of the show."

Responding to his firing, Sandilands said in a statement, "I'm disappointed at Channel 10's decision to remove me from Australian Idol. I have truly loved being a part of the show." Network Ten had held crisis talks with advertisers in the days prior to his firing amid concerns Sandilands would damage their brands. Idol creator Simon Fuller reportedly gave Ten his blessing to fire Sandilands. It was believed Sandilands earned A$1 millions of his estimated annual A$2.8 million income from Idol. The suspension of the radio show was announced on Sunday 2 August 2009. The show's usual 6:00 am to 9:00 am slot on 3 August was filled by Chris Page who announced that "They have not been suspended ... the show has not finished." Page then reread Austereo general manager Jenny Parkes' statement on air just after 6:30 am:

Kyle Sandilands' management has advised Austereo that he is unable to perform his duties on-air at this time. Further, following a great deal of consideration and having consulted Jackie O and all stakeholders, Austereo has formed the view that it is in the interest of all parties for the [program] to go into recess until we have completed an across-the-networks review of the principals [sic] and protocols of our interaction with our audience.

=== Concentration Camp comments ===
In 2009, Sandilands commented live on air on Australian comedian and actress Magda Szubanski's weight and her work with a weight loss company. Szubanski has been quite outspoken about her struggles with weight loss. Sandilands joked that Szubanski's work with the weight loss company was not finished. Live on air on 2Day FM's Kyle and Jackie O Show, he was quoted saying "...Magda could have another run out of it ... She could get another season out of them, easy ... she's not skinny". Co-host Jackie O suggested Szubanski might not be able to lose any more weight due to her build. "That's what all fat people say," Sandilands replied. "You put her in a concentration camp and you watch the weight fall, like she could be skinny". Szubanski's family is of Polish origin, a country where many of the worst Nazi concentration camps, including Auschwitz, were located.

=== Disability comments ===
Sandilands' comments about disability have outraged Australian disability groups. He called a child with disability a "spider baby" in 2012, and he used terms like "spastics" and "retards". He said he would donate $35,000 to a family of a child with a disability in 2009; however, he donated only $20,000, but he later gave the full amount. In 2006, Sandilands referred to an Australian Idol contestant as a "mong", a term that has been used in the past as a label for people with Down syndrome. Sandilands was investigated by the Australian Communications and Media Authority (ACMA) after the 2012 comment.

=== Virgin Mary comments ===
On 19 September 2019, Sandilands commented on air that the Mother of Jesus was a "liar who got knocked up behind a camel shed" (a sceptical reference to the virgin birth of Jesus), along with describing those who follow Islam and Christianity as "...dumb as dog sh*t". Sandilands later apologised for the remarks; but this did not pacify protesters, who on 23 September called for Sandilands to be sacked, likening the situation to the sacking of Israel Folau earlier that year. The Kyle and Jackie O Show returned to air on 30 September 2019 following a week off air.

=== Homophobia ===
In 2022, Sandilands claimed that monkeypox was a "big gay disease" and that "only the gays" were contracting monkeypox. He later defended the remarks by claiming that "no one else is giving the gays the warning."

By contrast, in August 2017, Sandilands opposed a caller to The Kyle and Jackie O Show who contended that it was "cruel" for same-sex couples to raise children. In that exchange, Sandilands passionately reprimanded the caller's views and ended the conversation by insulting him and telling him, "Go away, you peasant."

=== Fatphobic comments ===
Across his career, Sandilands made numerous fatphobic insults, most notably on the 2006 season of Australian Idol. The former panellist openly admitted to judging Australian Idol contestants' future success based on their weight. In 2006, he told 16-year-old Jessica Mauboy to "lose the jelly belly" and warned Kate DeAraugo to work on her "tuck shop lady arms". Kyle claimed he was helping the contestants "be the best they can be".

"For some reason, people think I don't like women that are overweight," he said. "If they're fat, then I say to them they should lose weight."

Sandilands has also made other comments about other celebrities and journalists, often using it as an insult when somebody has made a negative comment towards him. Most prominently in 2012, he called a News Limited journalist a "fat, bitter thing" and a "fat slag" after she gave his show A Night with the Stars a negative review. "What a fat bitter thing you are, you deputy editor of an online thing. You've got a nothing job anyway," Kyle said on air. "You're a piece of sh*t. You little troll... You should be fired from your job."

According to the Sydney Morning Herald, he also claimed that he would "hunt [her] down" for her review.

=== Misogynistic comments ===
During his controversial interview with A Current Affair in 2013, Kyle addressed being called a misogynist. "I've read that I'm a misogynist, I'm a women hater, I always attack women. It's simply not true. I'll say anything to anyone". Among other misogynistic comments over his career, the most notable was in 2022 involving TV personality and radio host Abbie Chatfield, who called out Kyle and her fellow The Bachelor Australia alum Brittany Hockley for slut-shaming her on-air with comments relating to US rapper Yung Gravy appearing on her podcast It's a Lot.

"Kyle is starting all this tone but [for Brittany] to go along with the tone because you have nothing more, sorry, nothing funny to say but like slut shame and say, I have no doubt you're going on a date with her ... Kyle, you have no idea about my sexual habits unless you listen to [my] podcast." She added, "It's high school weird sh*t and it's also like, encouraging women to pit themselves against each other." She continued "Give me sh*t, but don't make it at the expense of other people listening and other women listening. Do not perpetuate slut-shaming bullsh*t on the biggest radio show in the country."

Chatfield noted that the KIISFM hosts must have an issue with her because she's "able to speak about sexuality in a way that isn't shameful."

== Political views ==
Sandilands is a supporter of Donald Trump, he described Trump's victory over Kamala Harris in the 2024 election as a "win for everyone".

Upon Sussan Ley's election as leader of the Liberal Party, Sandilands called her "a real powerhouse of a woman". He also said that he votes for the Liberal Party.

As of 2026, Sandilands supports the One Nation political party.

== Personal life ==
On 26 September 2008, Sandilands married pop singer Tamara Jaber and the couple shared a house in St Ives, located in Sydney's Upper North Shore. However, on 12 July 2010, it was reported the couple had split.

Since March 2012, it was reported that Sandilands was in a relationship with much younger woman Imogen Anthony. They split up in 2019.

On 13 August 2015, Sandilands took his shirt off during a live broadcast of The Morning Show, after claiming he has been "fat-shamed" by the media, and afterwards admitted: "I think I'm going to have to do something about the weight. I've got the high blood pressure, the sleep apnoea, I'm a mess." He also confirmed he was to have a hernia operation in December 2015.

In February 2022, Sandilands and his partner Tegan announced they were expecting a baby, and they had the gender reveal for Otto during a cruise on Sydney Harbour as two planes streaked coloured smoke overhead. Before their son's birth, Sandilands announced that they were naming his radio partner Jackie O as Otto's godmother, surprising her in their studio off-air. On 11 August 2022, Kyle Sandilands became a father for the first time when his fiancée Tegan Kynaston gave birth to their son Otto.

Sandilands married Kynaston in April 2023 at Swifts, Darling Point, in Sydney, which included high-profile political figures such as prime minister Anthony Albanese and New South Wales premier Chris Minns. Notably, the groomsmen consisted of former nightclub owner John Ibrahim and convicted drug dealer Simon Main.

In February 2025, Sandilands revealed, live on his radio program, that he had a brain aneurysm and that he would require surgery.
