= Jackie O (radio host) =

Australian radio and television presenter (born 1975)

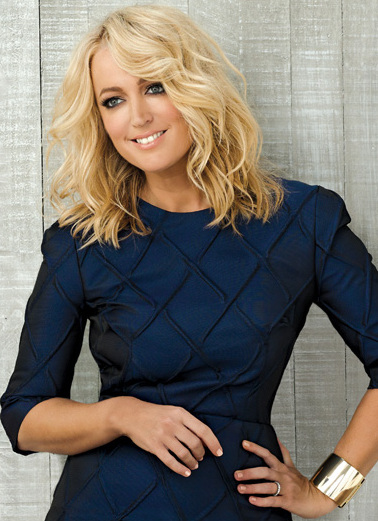
- Jackie O in 2015
- Born: Jacqueline Ellen Last; 31 January 1975 (age 51); Adelaide, South Australia
- Spouse(s): Phil O'Neil (m. 1994; div. 1999) Lee Henderson (m. 2003; sep. 2018)
- Children: 1
- Presenting career
- Show: The Kyle and Jackie O Show; The Kyle and Jackie O Hour of Power; Take 40 Australia; Australian Idol; The Masked Singer Australia
- Station: KIIS 106.5
- Previous shows: Hot 30 Countdown, Australian Princess, Popstars, Big Brother Australia

Jacqueline Ellen Henderson (née Last; born 31 January 1975), better known as Jackie O, is a former Australian radio and television presenter. She is best known for co-hosting The Kyle and Jackie O Show alongside Kyle Sandilands for twenty-one years. She has also presented The Hot Hits Live from LA, Hot30 Countdown, Take 40 Australia and two series of Australian Princess.

Born in Adelaide, she worked at Triple M Adelaide with her former husband Phil O'Neil, being part of the nightly program named Phil O'Neil's Hot 30. She has also hosted celebrity prank show Surprise Surprise Gotcha and appeared on the 2007 comedy series The Nation on the Nine Network. She was also the co-host of Big Brother (alongside Sandilands) after Gretel Killeen, the original host, resigned from the series.

On 1 November 2013, Jackie and Sandilands announced that they would not be returning in 2014 to host their 2Day FM breakfast show, which at that time was generating around $30 million AUD in advertising revenue yearly. On 29 November 2013, Kyle and Jackie O announced their move to rival radio network ARN and show on new 106.5 station in 2014.

== Radio career ==
In August 2013, Kyle and Jackie O announced that they would be moving from 2Day FM to KIIS 106.5FM. By March 2014 they had more than doubled the number of breakfast listeners at KiiS FM, with their show being the most popular FM show in Sydney with 532,000 listeners, while 2Day FM lost 242,000 listeners during the move.

In 2018, Sandilands dared Jackie O to write and record a song in one day; the result, "Honey Money", written by Avalonia and produced by KIIS FM producer Kian Oliver (who also provided a rap), went to number one on the Australian iTunes chart (#13 on the ARIA Digital Sales chart, spending one week within the Top 50), with all proceeds being donated to Drought Angels, a charity set up to help drought-affected Australian farmers. The song was later removed due to a copyright infringement issue with the artwork, as Jackie O's face had been hastily Photoshopped onto that of Iggy Azalea's. Jackie O announced her intention to reupload the song for free.

In November 2023, it was revealed the pair had signed a 10-year, A$200 million deal, a record for the Australian market; in other words, Sandilands and Jackie O would each get a base salary of $10 million, plus bonus total stock options valued at $14 million. The pair also negotiated a clause that allows them to broadcast from anywhere on earth; additionally, the show will be syndicated in the Melbourne market, leading to the cancellation of the Jase & Lauren show by the end of 2023.

On 20 February 2026, Jackie O abruptly left her radio show following an on-air incident in which Sandilands criticised her work ethic during a segment about Andrew Mountbatten-Windsor. Over a week later in March, KIIS FM parent company ARN released a statement confirming that Jackie O's contract from the show had been terminated after she informed them that she can "no longer continue to work with Sandilands", marking the end of their show, three years into a ten year contract. It was also revealed that ARN had offered her a potential new show on the KIIS Network, however it would not be under her previous $100 million contract. Several days later, Jackie O released a statement claiming that she did not quit or resign from the show and her contract, and her and Sandilands have both hired lawyers as a result of the cancellation.

In March 2026, Jackie O began a legal case against ARN following Sandilands' initiation of similar legal action for unlawful sacking. She is demanding compensation of "at least" $82,250,000.

== Television career ==
Jackie O has hosted a variety of television shows, most prominently the Popstars series, in which televised auditions were held to select members of a vocal group.

In June 2007, she was a cast member of The Nation, which aired on the Nine Network. She was also co-host of the comedy show Surprise Surprise Gotcha on the same network; the series has been called the Australian version of Punk'd, involving pranking celebrities. In October 2007, she along with her radio partner Kyle Sandilands would take Gretel Killeen's job in hosting the 2008 series of Big Brother Australia. Killeen hosted the show from its start in 2001 to 2007. Following poor ratings for this 2008 series, Network Ten announced on 14 July 2008 that Big Brother Australia would not return in 2009.

In 2019, it was announced that Jackie O would be one of the panellists on The Masked Singer Australia alongside Dannii Minogue, Dave Hughes and Lindsay Lohan. However, after the third season, she announced that she would be departing the show to spend more time with her daughter. She was replaced by fellow radio host Chrissie Swan.

== Personal life ==
She was married to her co-host Phil O'Neil during their combined radio career. After their divorce, O'Neil moved to the United Kingdom in the early 2000s. In 2003, she married British photographer Lee Henderson. The couple announced their separation in October 2018.

In 2009, Jackie O was named as the second-most-hated celebrity in an annual list by Zoo Magazine, sharing the top two with her radio co-host.

Jackie O has been open about her struggles with weight management. In late 2019, she revealed that she had begun to drastically put on weight and was desperate to shed it back off before filming the second season of The Masked Singer. In late 2020, Jackie O joined became an ambassador for Weight Watchers and publicly lost 10 kilograms in 2021. However, in 2022, Jackie revealed that she had put back on all of the weight that she had previously lost after joining Weight Watchers. Later that year, Jackie O took a personal hiatus from broadcasting to deal with long COVID complications after contracting COVID-19 in early 2022. She returned at the start of 2023 and had lost 12 kilograms (26 lb) during her hiatus with a Weight Watchers plan.

In October 2024, Jackie O revealed her three-year struggle with painkillers, sleeping pills, and alcohol. She said that she was consuming up to 24 codeine tablets daily at the height of her addiction, as well as 14 sleeping pills (Stillnox), all washed down with alcohol. For treatment, she admitted herself to the Betty Ford Clinic in 2022. In court documents, Jackie O revealed that she suffered from Post-traumatic stress disorder (PTSD) following her work on The Kyle and Jackie O Show with Sandilands.

== Discography ==
Singles

- "Honey Money" featuring Kian Oliver (2018)
