= Commercial Radio Australia =

Industry organization for commercial radio broadcasting in Australia

Commercial Radio Australia Ltd.
- Predecessor: Federation of Australian Radio Broadcasters
- Formation: 1930
- Type: Industry group
- Purpose: To represent the rights and interests of commercial radio stations in Australia.
- Headquarters: Sydney, Australia
- Chief executive officer: Lizzie Young
- Chairman: Ciaran Davis
- Website: commercialradio.com.au; radioitsalovething.com.au

Commercial Radio Australia (CRA) is the peak body for the commercial radio broadcasting industry in Australia. CRA was formed in 1930 as the Federation of Australian Radio Broadcasters.

It provides representation and advocacy on common statutory, regulatory, and technical matters of concern; develops standards including the code of practice; manages industry-wide research and reporting, including the collection of audience ratings data; and runs the industry trade awards. As of 2018, CRA had 260 members, representing 99 per cent of Australian commercial radio licensees.

== About ==
In 1924, Australia introduced B-class radio licences for stations that would be fully funded by advertising rather than by a listener licence fee. In 1928, B-class licence holders formed a federation of state organisations, the Australian Federation of ["B"] Broadcasting Stations (AFBS), to represent and advance their common interests, including against the A-class licence holders. This was renamed in 1930 as the Australian Federation of Commercial Broadcasting Stations (AFCBS), and subsequently renamed the Federation of Australian Commercial Broadcasters (FACB). The federation was established to represent and preserve the interests and rights of Australian licensed broadcasting stations, providing representation on such common concerns as use of the term "B-class", royalty and copyright payments, and transmitter requirements. It changed its name to Federation of Australian Radio Broadcasters (FARB), and to its current name in 2002.

By the middle of the 1930s, B-class stations started to be referred to as "commercial" instead, although the older term remained in use until World War II. The organisation continued to provide industry representation and advice into the 1930s, and aimed for industry self-regulation. In 1936, it produced the industry's Code of Ethics, and in 1938 began accrediting advertising agents federally. The Federal government agreed in March 1939 to increased regulatory representation for the organisation, with an informal committee to consist of a technical representative from the Postmaster-General's Department, a representative from AFCBS, and a legally-trained chairman. This did not, however, eventuate after changes of Minister.

Industry self-regulation increased with the release of the Broadcasting Services Act 1992, which allowed industry groups to develop codes of practice under section 123 of the Act. Such codes of practice are registered with and enforced by the Australian Communications and Media Authority (ACMA), the broadcasting regulator. CRA developed the initial codes of practice for commercial radio in 1993, and has released updated versions in 2004, 2010, and 2013. ACMA has, however, had difficulty in enforcing commercial radio's compliance with these codes of practice, in particular broadcasts made by Alan Jones and Kyle Sandilands.

CRA manages the collection of audience ratings data. As of January 2017, this is performed under contract by GfK.

CRA conducts the Australian Commercial Radio Awards for stations and personnel, and Siren Awards for radio advertising.

== History ==
The Federation of Australian Radio Broadcasters (FARB) was initially established in 1930 as an industry association to represent the rights and interests of licensed commercial broadcasting stations. The organisation aimed to provide representation on copyright and royalty payments, as well as the relationship between national and commercial radio services. In so doing, they exerted significant power over individual stations, and acted as a key spokesman for the Australian commercial radio industry.

During the late 1930s and early 1940s, FARB exercised a greater say in regulatory matters through the implementation of an informal committee. Subsequently, FARB issued its own Standards of Broadcasting Practice in 1946, regulating children's programs, and Sunday and medical advertising. FARB played an important role in major decisions concerning the commercial radio sector, maintaining a position of self-regulation; opposing intrusion by the government and industry bodies such as the Australian Building Codes Board (ABCB).

In response to widespread criticism of talkback radio in 1971, FARB initiated a government relations committee to enhance public and political relations. In 1973, FARB created the Fairness Code for Broadcasters, which codified self-regulation in the commercial radio sector. This was consolidated and renamed in 1993 as the FARB Commercial Radio Codes of Practice and Guidelines, yet still only applied to FARB members. The standards underwent further revision in 1999, and were extended to apply to all commercial radio licensees.

FARB changed to its current name 'Commercial Radio Australia' in 2002. It currently has 260 members, representing 99 per cent of Australian commercial radio licensees. The current chief executive officer is Joan Warner and chairman is Grant Blackley.

== Regulation of commercial radio in Australia ==
=== 1920s–1930s: introduction of public broadcasting and the bifurcated system ===
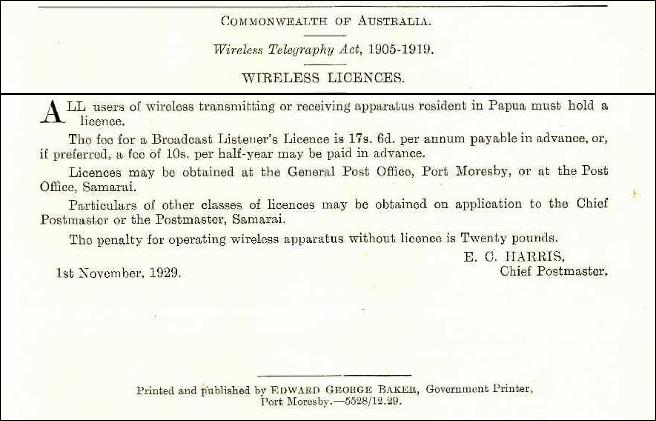
The Wireless Telegraphy Act 1905–1919 required that listeners pay an annual licence fee to the Post Office to obtain access to radio.

Upon the introduction of public broadcasting in Australia in 1919, the Postmaster-General's Department controlled wireless broadcasting in accordance with the Wireless Telegraphy Act 1905. This was because broadcasting was initially perceived as an extension of an existing means of communication, which was traditionally controlled by the Post Office. Control was temporarily transferred to the Naval Department within the Department of Defence during World War I.

In 1923, the government introduced a sealed set system, where stations could be licensed to broadcast and then sell radio sets and subscriptions to "listeners-in". This allowed radio to become publicly available, though listeners had to pay an additional government licence fee (Parliament of Australia, 2020). The scheme proved unpopular amongst listeners, as only four applications were processed under the system, and more than 1400 listeners failed to pay their license fees.

In response, the government instituted an "open" bifurcated broadcasting system in 1924 – consisting of "A" and "B" class stations which were licensed differently. A-class stations maintained their revenue from listener's licenses, whereas B-class stations generated their own revenue through advertisements and other paid publicity. All A-class stations were controlled by the Postmaster-General's Department, with program operations contracted to private companies, until their acquisition by the Australian Broadcasting Company in 1929. The National Service was designed as a "completely coordinated public utility", and aimed to maximise audience reach by ensuring that programmes could be heard by at least 90 per cent of the Commonwealth. Comparatively, B-class stations were a conglomeration of individually operated units and administered by private enterprise. In the early 1930s, the quantity and popularity of Australian commercial radio stations significantly increased, fuelled by increased demand for cheap and accessible home entertainment during the Great Depression. All stations in both A and B-class categories were to be licensed for five years. The system was finalised in 1932, consisting of the national broadcaster (ABC) with 12 stations and the commercial sector with 43 stations.

=== 1940s–1950s: independent boards and introduction of television ===
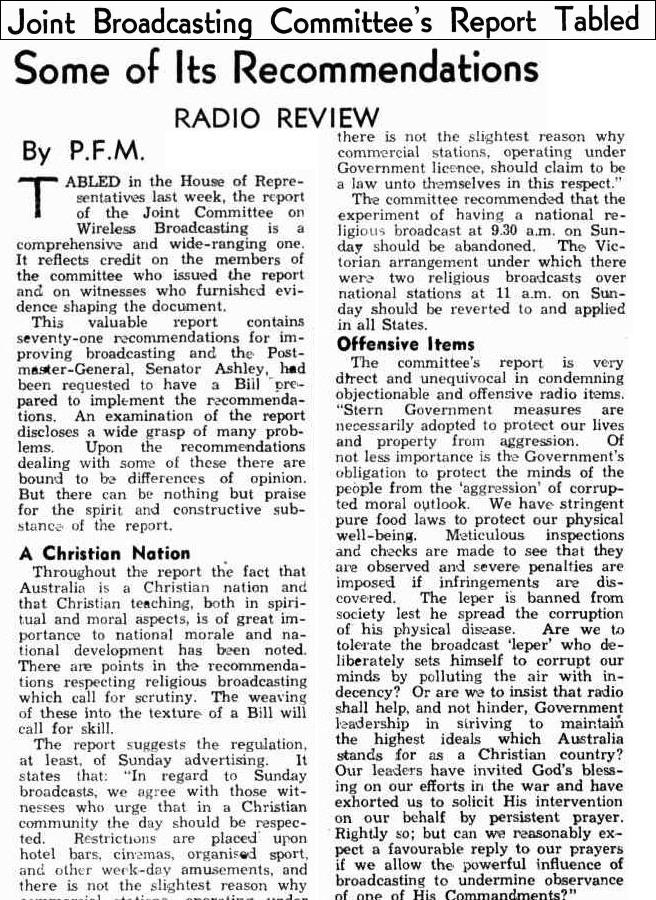
Recommendations made by the Joint Broadcasting Committee's Report in 1942, as summarised in The Advocate

In 1941, a Joint Committee on Wireless Broadcasting was selected to conduct a review of broadcasting, particularly regarding amendments to the Australian Broadcasting Commission Act 1932 (Cth), concerning the control of the ABC and appointment of commissioners. The following year, the Committee made recommendations to the government for the nationalisation of commercial radio. The separation between Class A and B stations was preserved by the Broadcasting Bill of 1948. That same year, the Federation established an independent Australian Broadcasting Control Board, which transferred all Post Office powers to the Federal Government. The Board was responsible for supervising broadcasting in an attempt to achieve a reasonable degree of correlation between the two broadcasting services. This was achieved through mandating and reviewing the provision of services, operations and equipment to uphold public interest. The Board also acted to prevent a Government monopoly; ensuring the preservation of the bifurcated national and commercial radio system. The introduction of television in 1956 consolidated the Board's position; as additional officers were assigned and assumed control of the program and administrative functions of radio. Their power was further cemented and protected by the Broadcasting and Television Bill 1958, which extensively addressed matters pertaining to radio and television.

=== 1960s–1980s: introduction of public broadcasting and FM radio ===
In 1976, the Broadcasting and Television Act 1956 was amended by the Whitlam government to change the Australian Broadcasting Control Board to the Australian Broadcasting Tribunal; allowing for the introduction of FM radio and public broadcasting. Initially, commercial radio stations were prohibited from accessing FM, with its first use being for public broadcasting – as ABC-FM, now known as ABC Classic, was established the same year. In 1980, the Federal Government offered a limited number of FM licences to new players within the commercial radio industry, allowing the selected AM stations to convert to FM.

=== 1990s–2000s: increased deregulation and industry self-regulation ===
Throughout the 1990s, Australian radio became increasingly deregulated. This was initiated by the Broadcasting Services Act 1992, which relaxed many standards for commercial radio, including the Australian music broadcasting quota. This was replaced by industry generated self-regulation codes and the revision of broadcasting licenses. This was accompanied by the introduction of the Australian Broadcasting Authority to administer the self-regulation of the Australian radio industry; assuming the planning and regulation roles of the Australian Broadcasting Tribunal. This was amalgamated with the Australian Communications Authority on 1 July 2005 to form the Australian Communications and Media Authority (ACMA).

== Codes of practice and guidelines ==
The development and management of the Commercial Radio Code of Practice is a principal role of the organisation; and serves to ensure that content is in line with community expectations. It establishes the minimum standards for programs on commercial radio stations to uphold community safeguards in relation to news and current affairs, music and entertainment, and material unsuitable for broadcast. This code is developed in consultation with CRA members, and is registered and reviewed alongside ACMA. It operates for the purposes of Part 9 of the Broadcasting Services Act 1992, as well as Section 123, which requires a co-regulatory Commercial Radio Code of Practice administered by ACMA. Compliance is compulsory for all commercial radio licensees. Through operating within a co-regulatory framework, ACMA plays a crucial role in invigilating the code, and is able to implement extra conditions on the licence if conditions are not followed. The code is also administered by the Department of Infrastructure, Transport, Regional Development and Communications.

=== Development and management of the code ===
The code undergoes an extensive process of development and review by the CRA and ACMA before publication. Throughout this process, complaints data about the radio industry and the CRA is analysed and a draft code is developed. This is followed by public consultation, where the public are encouraged to make written submissions and comments on the draft – allowing the CRA and ACMA to determine any necessary modifications to the draft code. Research about the listener experience from ACMA, the Australian Law Reform Commission and the Office of the Australian Information Commissioner is also integrated within the drafting process. The modified final draft, alongside additional written commentary, is then submitted to ACMA for registration as a Part 9 code. The code is reviewed triennially.

=== Guidelines ===
The CRA also provides a number of guidelines for commercial broadcasters when producing content. These do not form the Code of Practice. These serve to clarify acceptable practices in commercial radio, particularly regarding the broadcast of emergency information, and the portrayal of: Indigenous Australians, women, as well as those affected by suicide, mental illness and domestic violence. These are separate from the code of practice, and are not followed as closely by the CRA and ACMA.

== Awards and events ==
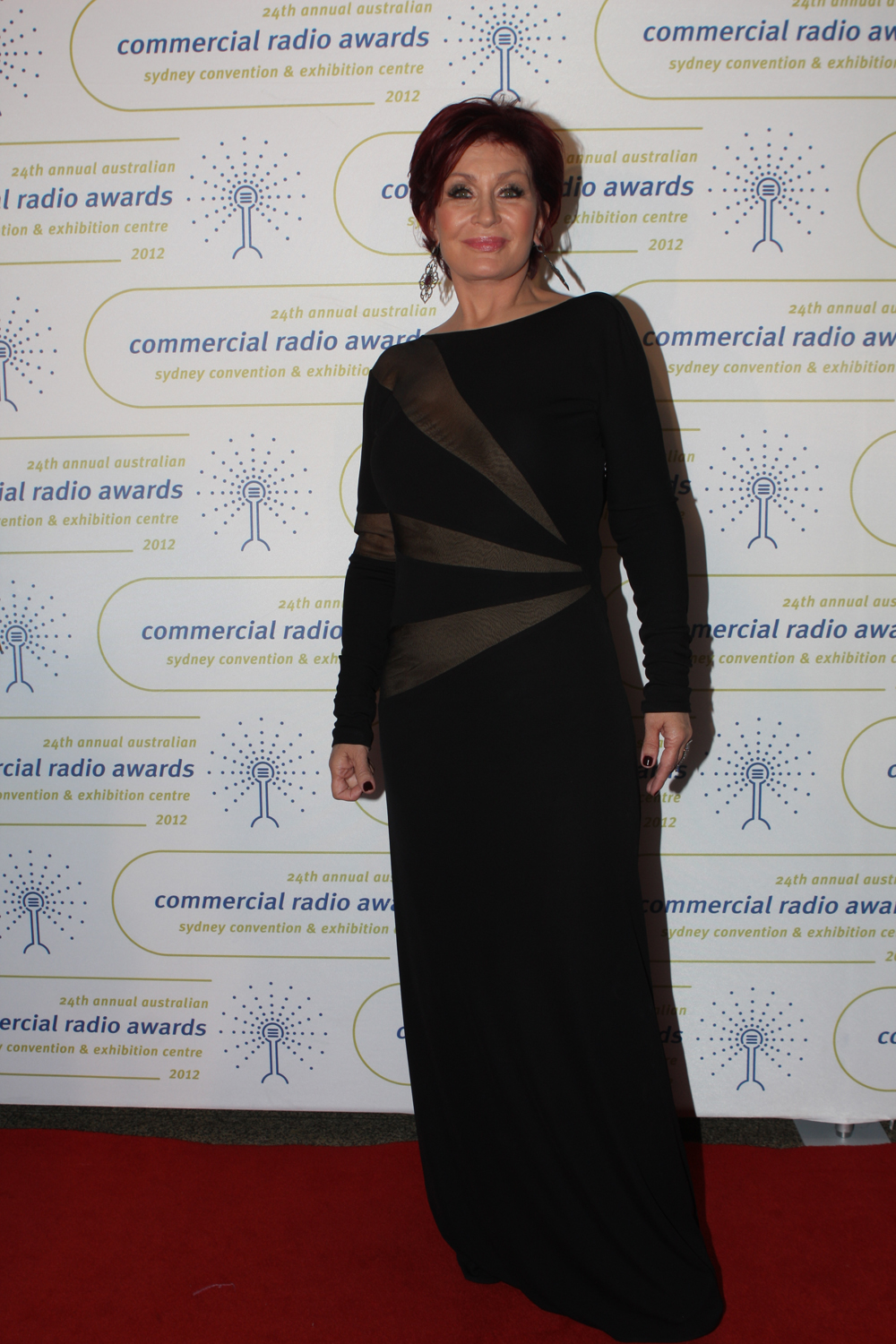
Sharon Osbourne co-hosted the 2012 ACRAs with Merrick Watts. Pictured here at the event in Sydney.

The CRA conducts the Australian Commercial Radio Awards (ACRAs) for radio stations and personnel, which is held annually on the east coast of Australia. The event is typically hosted by an industry member, with rotating hosts presenting specific awards categories. There are also various performers to entertain attendees throughout the night. In 2002, the CRA introduced the Commercial Radio Hall of Fame, which recognises and inducts individuals who have demonstrated a lifelong commitment to the Australian radio industry. In addition, the CRA also oversees the Siren Awards for radio advertising each year.

=== Siren Awards ===
The Siren Awards are an Australian award ceremony held to celebrate creativity and excellence in radio advertising. Launched in 2005, they aim to promote and reward outstanding radio commercials. There are five rounds; the Round Winners are announced every two months. The annual Gold Siren winner is automatically entered into the Cannes Lions International Advertising Festival. Creatives may enter into one of three categories: Radio Single, Radio Campaigns and Radio Craft.

==== Previous winners ====
According to the Siren Awards website, the previous winner of each section are:

Year	Gold Siren Single winner	Silver Siren Single winner	Silver Siren Campaign winner	Silver Siren Craft winner	Siren Client Award winner
2020	Hugh Gurney & Joe Sibley, The Monkeys"www.PeteGotPissed.com.au"	Hugh Gurney & Joe Sibley, The Monkeys, "www.PeteGotPissed.com.au"	Hugh Gurney & Joe Sibley, The Monkeys, "www.TheInternetRemembers.com.au"	Ray Ali & Chris Gates, "The Loop"	Ray Ali & Carlo Mazzarella, "The Loop" (Beyond Blue)
2019	Ben Clare & Celia Mortlock, Clemenger BBDO Sydney, "Ducking Autocorrect"	Christie Luxton, Cristian Staal, Shaun Conroy, Clemenger BBDO Brisbane, "Fun Money – Barbershop"	Ben Clare & Celia Mortlock, Clemenger BBDO Sydney, "Ducking Autocorrect"	Christie Luxton, Mike Lange & Michael Thomas, Cutting Edge, "Fun Money – Barbershop"	John Skaro, Phil van Bruchem, Rachel Blacklaws & Alex Walding, BMW Dentsu & Cox Inall Change, "Bill Bowelly"
2018	Ray Ali & Carlo Mazzarella, Clemenger BBDO Melbourne, "Sound Booth"	Ray Ali & Carlo Mazzarella, Clemenger BBDO Melbourne, "Sound Booth"	Tim Newton & Wilora Keeley, J. Walter Thompson, "How much to…?"	Wellison D'Assuncao & Matt Perrott, Uncanny Valley, "NSW Water Safety"	Ray Ali & Carlo Mazzarella, Clemenger BBDO Melbourne, "Sound Booth"
2017	Joe Hawkins & Tommy Medalia, 303MullenLowe, "Time with Mum"	Evan Roberts & Stephen de Wolf, Clemenger Melbourne, "Every Speed has a Consequence"	Joe Hawkins & Tommy Medalia, 303MullenLowe, "Time with Mum"	Paul le Couteur, Richard Sahw, Russel Fox & Evan Roberts, Flagstaff Studios, "Ticking Clock"	Richard Shaw & Russel Fox, Clemenger BBDO Melbourne, "Ticking Clock"
2016	Elle Bullen & James Orr, Clemenger BBDO Melbourne, "Texas Chainsaw Massacre"	Elle Bullen & James Orr, Clemenger BBDO Melbourne, "Texas Chainsaw Massacre"	Cam Blackley, Alex Derwin, David Fraser & Dantie Van Der Merwe, BMF, "Liquor Translator"	Ralph van Dijk & Paul Le Couteur, Eardrum, "Texas Chainsaw Massacre"	Cam Blackley, Alex Derwin, David Fraser & Dantie Van Der Merwe, BMF, "El Toro Macho"
2015	Matt Dickson, Southern Cross Austereo, "We Don't Do Husbands"	Alida Henson, Megan Riley, Guy Howlett, Neil Martin, Pat Lennox & Ben Green, Marketforce, "Women in Engineering"	Matt Dickson, Southern Cross Austereo, "We Don't Do Husbands"	Paul Le Couteur, Flagstaff Studios, "Ball of Fire"	Matt Arbon & Alex Davidson, Workshop Australia, "Spot the Difference"
2014	Jim Curtis & Ryan Fitzgerald, DDB Sydney, "Road"	Not awarded	John Mescall & Pat Baron, McCann, "Metro Notify Campaign"	Steve Wakelam, Nick Pringle, Jim Curtis, Ryan Fitzgerald & Danny Grifoni, DDB Sydney, "Road"	Rohan Lancaster & Darren Pitt, Clemenger BBDO Melbourne, "Shoppers Please"
2013	John Mescall, McCann Melbourne, "Set Fire To Your Hair"	Not awarded	John Mescall & Pat Baron, McCann Melbourne, "Dumb Ways to Die"	Cristian Staal, Ralph Barnett, Ralph van Dijk & Michael Bates, Eardrum, "Earphone Bully"	Steve Browning, Writing by Steve Browning, "Chocolatte/Mango/Café Au Lait"
2012	Tim Green & Tim Cairns, The Monkeys, "Holidays"	Tim Green & Tim Cairns, The Monkeys, "Holidays"	Des Hemeister, Gatecrasher, "AA Campaign"	James Rickard, Scott Illingworth & Pete Best, Best FX, "Scratched Record"	Not awarded
2011	Andrew Woodhead & Eamonn Dixon, Leo Burnett Melbourne, "Slow Mornings"	Josh Edge and Rikki Burns, The Brand Agency (WA), "Slender Tailed"	Andrew Woodhead & Eamonn Dixon, Leo Burnett Melbourne, "Slow Mornings"	Martyn Zub, Oasis Post, "Bath"	Not awarded
2010	Julian Schreiber & Tom Martin, Clemenger BBDO Melbourne, "Clothes"	Julian Schreiber & Tom Martin, Clemenger BBDO Melbourne, "Clothes"	Andrew Garrick, Network Ten, "Glee Launch Campaign"	Ralph van Dijk & Paul Taylor, Eardrum / Sound Reservoir, "Passenger"	Not awarded
2009	Steve Dodds, Whybin TBWA, "ASCA Radio Campaign"	Steve Dodds, Whybin TBWA, "21st Birthday"	Kurt Beaudoin & Josh Edge, The Brand Agency, "Find Your Animal"	Garry Horner & Beau Silvester, Whybin TBWA, "Rugby"	Not awarded
2008	Paul Reardon & Julian Schreiber, Clemenger BBDO Melbourne, "Disclaimer"	Not awarded	Simon Johnson, Charlie Cook, Ed James & Justin Carew, DDB Sydney, "Fiorella Kis-Major"	Luke Chess, Paul Taylor & Ralph Van Dijk, Belgiovane Williams Mackay, "Police Radio"	Not awarded
2007	Paul Reardon & Jonas Peterson, Clemenger BBDO Melbourne, "Hoedown"	Not awarded	Glenn Dalton, George Freckleton & Andrew Foote, AJF Partnership, "French/Teddy Bear/Roses"	Ralph van Dijk & Rod Enright, Eardrum, "Shareholder"	Not awarded
2006	John Mescall, Rebecca Newman & Malcolm Chambers, Smart, "Chicken Inseminator"	Not awarded	John Mescall, Rebecca Newman & Malcolm Chambers, Smart, "Radioactive, Guinea Pig, Chicken, Isolation Chamber"	Kirsten Scholes & Vaughan Jones, Hot 91, Sunshine Coast, "The tadpole and the egg"	Not awarded
2005	Ben Coulson & Josh Stephens, George Patterson Bates Melbourne, "Victoria Bitter Campaign"	Not awarded	Ben Coulson & Josh Stephens, George Patterson Bates Melbourne, "Victoria Bitter Campaign"	Not awarded	Not awarded
