= Mixx FM 106.3 =

Mixx FM 106.3 (3CCS)
- Colac, Victoria; Australia
- Broadcast area: The Great South West (Colac RA1)
- Frequency: 106.3 MHz
- Branding: Music that Makes You Feel Good

Programming
- Format: Contemporary Hit Radio

Ownership
- Owner: Ace Radio
- Sister stations: 3CS

History
- Former frequencies: 92.7 MHz - Lorne

Technical information
- ERP: 10 kW
- HAAT: 30 m
- Repeater: 95.9 MHz - Apollo Bay

Links
- Website: mixx1063.com.au

Mixx FM 106.3 is a commercial radio station broadcasting from Colac, Victoria, Australia. It is currently owned by Ace Radio and broadcasts a Contemporary Hit Radio (CHR) format.

The station features both locally produced and syndicated content from Seven Media Group (formerly Southern Cross Austereo).

It has one repeater at Apollo Bay on 95.9 FM.

Previously, a repeater in Lorne was being broadcast on 92.7 FM, but this was turned off in August 2021 due to low listenership and the clear reception of Melbourne and Geelong FM stations in the area.
