= Take 40 Australia =

Australian radio show

Take 40 Australia was Australia's first and longest-running radio music countdown. It counted down and played the official top 40 singles on the ARIA chart on a weekly basis, running over a number of hours. It was broadcast nationally each week to over 1.2 million listeners. Starting in 1984, the show ended after 32 years with its final broadcast on Saturday 3 September 2016.

== History ==
Take 40 Australia first hit the airwaves in 1984 and was hosted by Barry Bissell for 20 years until his retirement in 2004. Bissell was an integral part of the show's success, counting down Australia's 40 biggest songs. He also celebrated the 1000th show milestone in 2003.

In November 2004, Andrew Günsberg (also known as "Andrew G") replaced Bissell as host. Günsberg hosted the show until November 2009.

In November 2009, Günsberg was replaced by Kyle Sandilands and Jackie O. Sandilands remained with the show until December 2011 and Jackie hosted the show solo until 2013. Angus O'Loughlin replaced Jackie O as host.

In February 2014, Ash London was announced as co-host of the show joining Angus. London left the show in December 2015 after resigning from Southern Cross Austereo. Emma Freedman was announced as co-host replacing London.

In August 2016, Southern Cross Austereo announced a revamped weekend lineup for the Hit Network and Take 40 Australia was no longer part of the lineup. The show ended after 32 years on Saturday 3 September 2016. "Closer" by The Chainsmokers was the last song to be played.

== Albums ==
During its run, Take 40 Australia, in association with Australian record companies, released a number of hit music compilation albums on CD and cassette.

Special mentions:

- TAKE 40 #1 (1991, Festival Records)
- TAKE 40 - 10 Years of No.1 Hits (1995, Festival Records)
- TAKE 40 - Certified Hits Collection (2000, Sony Music)
- TAKE 40 PLATINUM (2002, Warner Music)
- TAKE 40 PLATINUM CD/DVD (2003, Sony Music) included a DVD of music videos
