= Kent Small =

Australian radio presenter

- Born: 16 April 1984 (age 41); Sydney, Australia
- Occupation: Radio presenter
- Employer: KIIS Network

Kent Andrew "Smallzy" Small (born 16 April 1984) is an Australian radio presenter.

Small currently hosts The Smallzy Show on the KIIS Network.

== Career ==
Small started his career at age 19 at Star 104.5 on the Central Coast, New South Wales. After spending two and half years working with Nova Entertainment, he moved to Nova 106.9 in Brisbane in 2007 to present its local night show with Michelle Anderson. The duo consistently enjoyed ratings wins and went on to be nominated Best On-Air Team at the 2008 Australian Commercial Radio.

Kent hosted the nationally syndicated show Smallzy's Surgery, airing weeknights from 8pm to 10pm across Nova stations throughout Australia. The show dives deep into the world of music and celebrity culture, often broadcasting internationally to secure exclusive interviews with some of the biggest stars on the planet.

In August 2025, Kent announced his resignation from the Nova Network, He had secured an outstanding 92 survey wins over the past 13 years, consistently leading its timeslot and setting the benchmark for evening radio programming.

In October 2025, ARN Media announced that Small will host The Smallzy Show from 3–4pm and from 7–9pm each weekday across KIIS FM in Sydney, Melbourne, Brisbane, Adelaide, and KIIS DAB+ Perth from 2026. The show will feature interviews with chart-topping and emerging artists, plus a daily dose of pop culture news. He began broadcasting on 19th January 2026 with a production team of five staff.

Small previously presented a weekly music news segment on The Loop and was a fill-in presenter whilst Scott Tweedie was away.

Kent has appeared as pop culture contributor on Weekend Today and The Morning Show.

== Education ==
Kent attended Cranebrook High School in 1997–2000. He graduated from St Marys Senior High School in 2002. Also in 2002, Small studied at the Australian Film, Television and Radio School in Sydney.
