= KIIS 101.1 =

Radio station in Melbourne, Australia

Coordinates: 37°49′11.009″S 144°59′43.536″E

KIIS 101.1 (3TTT)
- Melbourne, Victoria; Australia
- Frequencies: 101.1 MHz FM and DAB+
- Branding: KIIS 1011

Programming
- Language: English
- Format: Contemporary hit radio
- Affiliations: KIIS Network

Ownership
- Owner: ARN; (Double T Radio Pty Ltd)
- Sister stations: Gold 104.3

History
- First air date: 21 February 1927; 99 years ago
- Former call signs: 3DB (1927–1988); 3TT (1988–1990)
- Former names: 101.1 TT-FM (1990–2001); Mix 101.1 (2001–2015)
- Former frequencies: 1180 kHz (1927–1935); 1030 kHz (1935–1978); 1026 kHz AM (1978–1990)
- Call sign meaning: Station was 3TT on AM (3 for Victoria)

Technical information
- Licensing authority: Australian Communications and Media Authority
- Class: Commercial
- ERP: 56 kW

Links
- Public licence information: Profile
- Website: www.kiis1011.com.au

KIIS 1011 (official callsign: 3TTT) is a commercial FM radio station broadcasting in Melbourne, Victoria, Australia, on a frequency of 101.1 MHz and is the Melbourne affiliate of ARN's KIIS Network. The station was formerly known as 3DB and 3TT, broadcasting on 1026 kHz AM, before converting to FM in 1990.

== History ==
=== 3DB ===
3DB was awarded its broadcast licence in 1925 but did not immediately come on air due to debates in Federal Parliament as to whether or not Australia should proceed with the then-unique system of A Class (later ABC) and B Class (later commercial) stations. The station was originally owned by Druleigh Business and Technical College Pty Ltd, hence the callsign DB. 3DB eventually made its on-air debut on 21 February 1927 in a fairly low-key manner.

From 1929 until 1987, 3DB was owned and operated by the Herald & Weekly Times (HWT), owners of The Herald and The Sun News-Pictorial, then separate newspapers.

For most of this era 3DB was one of Melbourne's most popular stations, topping ratings surveys for some decades. 3DB was extremely popular in all fields in which it broadcast. Music ranged from pop music and Top 40 to classical, some of it live. The station was also a big producer of radio drama (including soap operas), live variety programs, quizzes, etc. 3DB also transmitted many sporting events, particularly horse racing, VFL football, and test cricket from England. 3DB's women's programs and children's session were also popular.

One of the most important people in 3DB's history was David Thomas Worrall, who was appointed manager of the station by the Herald and Weekly Times' Sir Keith Murdoch in 1929, and who was to remain as manager until 1958. He was responsible for introducing many big budget programs.

From 1942 onwards, 3DB was the radio broadcaster of the Royal Children's Hospital's Good Friday Appeal and played a major part in promoting the appeal, with the sums raised annually increasing dramatically from 1942 onwards.

After purchasing the Geelong Advertiser and its subsidiary 3GL in 1987, the Herald and Weekly Times owned more than one station in the Melbourne/Geelong region and, thus, was required by the Australian Broadcasting Tribunal to divest itself of one station. 3DB was sold and actually had four owners for short periods in the 12 months of 1987.

J Albert & Son, a Sydney based music company and owners of 2UW, purchased 3DB in late 1987 and changed the call sign to 3TT. The last program to be broadcast under the 3DB call sign, in the very early hours of 2 April 1988, was a repeat of Bert Newton's 1987 documentary on the 60th anniversary of 3DB.

=== 3TT ===
The 3TT station name and a classic hits format were launched at 5.00 am on 2 April 1988. The first song played was The Doobie Brothers "Listen to the Music". The major reason cited for the change of name was that 3DB had recently broadcast under the slogan 3DB - The New Beginning and it was felt that that would have made it difficult to dramatically change the format whilst retaining the name, 3DB. However, the new owners had actually considered a few other new call-signs, particularly names which included the same initial being repeated twice, such as 3BB or 3MM.

Lawrence Costin who had been on the 3DB announcing staff for over 30 years was the only 3DB on-air personality to be retained by 3TT; as a newsreader and reporter.

=== From AM to FM ===
At midnight on 23-24 June 1990 the station converted to FM broadcasting on 101.1 MHz. 3DB/3TT's old AM frequency of 1026 AM was returned to the government, and from 1991, it was used by the ABC for 3PB, which broadcast intermittently with live coverage of federal parliament. In 1994, 3PB became a full-time news and parliament station ABC NewsRadio.

The events leading up to the transference of 3TT's licence to the FM radio band are quite complicated and political. Broadcasting on the FM band commenced in the US as early as 1933. There had been Australian experiments on the FM band in earlier years, but in the 1970s the Whitlam Labor government decided to issue the first permanent FM licences in Australia to community radio stations. The first such licence in Melbourne was issued to 3MBS in 1975. The Fraser coalition government continued the Whitlam policy and expanded the range of FM broadcasters, firstly by introducing the Australia-wide ABC FM network. This was followed by a number of brand new commercial stations; the first to open in Melbourne being EON FM.

Not surprisingly, there were protests from commercial stations on the AM band because they were not able to bid for stations on the FM band. This was seen by many as a big problem as FM was then seen as the future of radio broadcasting, and many stations who had pioneered the commercial side of the Australian industry saw themselves as being left out of its future development, even though many of them - including 3TT - had a history dating back to the 1920s. The Fraser government was not prepared to allocate FM licences to all AM stations, which is what the industry wanted, and what had occurred in many overseas countries. However, under some pressure, in the late 1980s the government decided to transfer one or two stations in the major cities from the AM to FM band, using a much criticised auction-style system in which those stations wishing to transfer bands were to put in bids, with the highest bids being accepted. In Melbourne the two highest bids were to be accepted, with six of the seven existing AM stations placing bids. (The exception being 3AW which argued that its older listening-base preferred the AM band to the FM band.)

The three highest bids were received from: 3KZ - $32 million; 3AK - $22 million; and 3TT - $11 million. The vast disparity in the bids suggests that there was no collusion between stations, and virtually no industrial espionage. Further, 3XY which had put in an even lower bid was quite convinced that it would get one of the two FM licences being offered.

In 1987, Kerry Packer of Australian Consolidated Press had sold the Nine Television Network to Alan Bond, and 3AK was included in the deal, even though Bond had made it clear that he was interested in the TV stations but not in radio - he therefore defaulted on his payment for an FM licence. The second Melbourne FM licence on offer was, therefore, eventually given to the third-highest bidder, 3TT.

=== 101.1 TTFM ===
Initially from opening on 24 June 1990, 3TTT retained the format of 3TT using the new call letters TTFM and their 1st slogan was; Turn It On! The New 101.1 TTFM. The first song that aired on TTFM was "In the Air Tonight" by Phil Collins. Then in 1993 TTFM was relaunched as an AC music station.

=== Mix 101.1 ===
In June 2001, the station rebranded to Mix 101.1 after joining the Mix Network. The station was similar to Mix 106.5 in Sydney in creating an emphasis on more music and less talk.

The last song that aired on Mix 101.1 was "Bye Bye Bye" by NSYNC.

=== KIIS 101.1 ===
In November 2014, the Australian Radio Network announced that Mix 101.1 would rebrand to KIIS 101.1 on 19 January 2015 with a new breakfast and drive show. Matt & Jane replaced Chrissie & Jane in the station's breakfast timeslot, with existing presenter Jane Hall to remain alongside former Fox FM breakfast and Triple M drive host Matt Tilley. Rosso on Drive was replaced by Hughesy & Kate, hosted by Dave Hughes and Kate Langbroek and formerly of Nova 100 breakfast. Both shows began on 19 January 2015, with the latter being networked across the KIIS Network of stations.

In October 2015, Jane Hall announced that she would be leaving the station and Matt & Jane at the end of the year to return to acting. She was replaced by Nova 100 breakfast co-host Meshel Laurie.

In October 2017, ARN announced that Matt Tilley, Meshel Laurie, Dave Hughes and Kate Langbroek would leave the station at the end of the year. Matt & Meshel was replaced by Jason 'Jase' Hawkins and Polly 'PJ' Harding. Will McMahon and Woody Whitelaw from Hit 92.9 have been announced as the new drive hosts. Hughesy & Kate moved to Southern Cross Austereo's Hit Network to replace Hamish & Andy.

In July 2021, ARN announced that Jason 'Jase' Hawkins would be joined by Lauren Phillips with Jase & Lauren starting 9 August following Polly 'PJ' Harding's departure from the station on July 23, 2021.

In November 2023, after months of media speculation, it was announced that The Kyle and Jackie O Show would be networked from KIIS 106.5 Sydney in 2024 effectively ending Jase & Lauren. The final show aired on Friday 1 December 2023. In March 2024, Jase & Lauren replaced Ben, Liam & Belle to host breakfast on Nova 100.

In March 2024, ARN announced changes to its daytime programming with Gordie Waters being networked from Sydney into Melbourne and KIIS 97.3 in Brisbane from April. Byron Cooke had previously announced his resignation.

In early March it was announced that Jackie was taking a break from the show and will no longer be working with Kyle, following an altercation on February 20, Kyle has also been accused of some misconduct of the contract, The Kyle & Jackie O Show was taken off the air. The show was replaced by KIIS Breakfast until October.

In September 2026, ARN Media announced, broadcaster Ash London, former AFL player Isaac Smith and stylist Elliot Garnaut hosted the new breakfast program, Ash, Issie & Elliot. The program launched on 26 October 2026, replacing The Kyle & Jackie O Show in the Melbourne market.

== Controversy ==
KIIS 101.1 was subjected to a controversy when it was found to have breached ACMA's regulations between 2024 and 2025 when it was reported that the Kyle and Jackie O show airing in the morning was found to have been airing offensive content as well as a urination game including discussions deeply graphic.

== Studios ==
3DB's original studio was on the 10th floor of Capitol House, above the Capitol Theatre, Swanston Street, next to the Druleigh Business and Technical College, original owners of the station. In 1929, shortly after the HWT purchased 3DB, the studios and offices were moved to 74 Flinders Street, to the east of the HWT building on the corner of Flinders and Exhibition Streets. In 1966, the HWT truck dock was expanded and, in the process, 74 Flinders Street was pulled down, with the station moving to 61 Flinders Lane, immediately behind the HWT building.

When 3DB became 3TT the station continued to broadcast from 61 Flinders Lane but, shortly after, in December 1988, 3TT moved to new studios in Queensbridge Street, South Melbourne.

The studio is now located in the inner suburb of Richmond, in the Pelaco building, sharing facilities with sister station Gold 104.3.
