= KIIS 106.5 =

Radio station in Sydney, Australia

KIIS 1065
- Sydney, New South Wales; Australia
- Frequencies: 106.5 MHz FM and DAB+
- Branding: KIIS 1065

Programming
- Language: English
- Format: Hot AC/CHR
- Affiliations: KIIS Network

Ownership
- Owner: ARN; (Commonwealth Broadcasting Corporation Pty Ltd)
- Sister stations: Gold 101.7

History
- First air date: 13 February 1925
- Former call signs: 2UW (1925–1994)
- Former names: Mix 106.5 (1994–2014)
- Former frequencies: 1125 kHz (1925–1935); 1110 kHz (1935–1978); 1107 kHz AM (1978–1994)

Technical information
- Licensing authority: ACMA
- ERP: 150,000 watts
- HAAT: 224 m
- Transmitter coordinates: 33°48′20″S 151°10′51″E

Links
- Public licence information: Profile
- Website: www.kiis1065.com.au

KIIS 1065 (call sign: 2WFM) is a commercial FM radio station in Sydney, Australia, on a frequency of 106.5 MHz. KIIS 1065 is one of the flagship stations on ARN Media's KIIS Network.

== History ==
=== 2UW ===
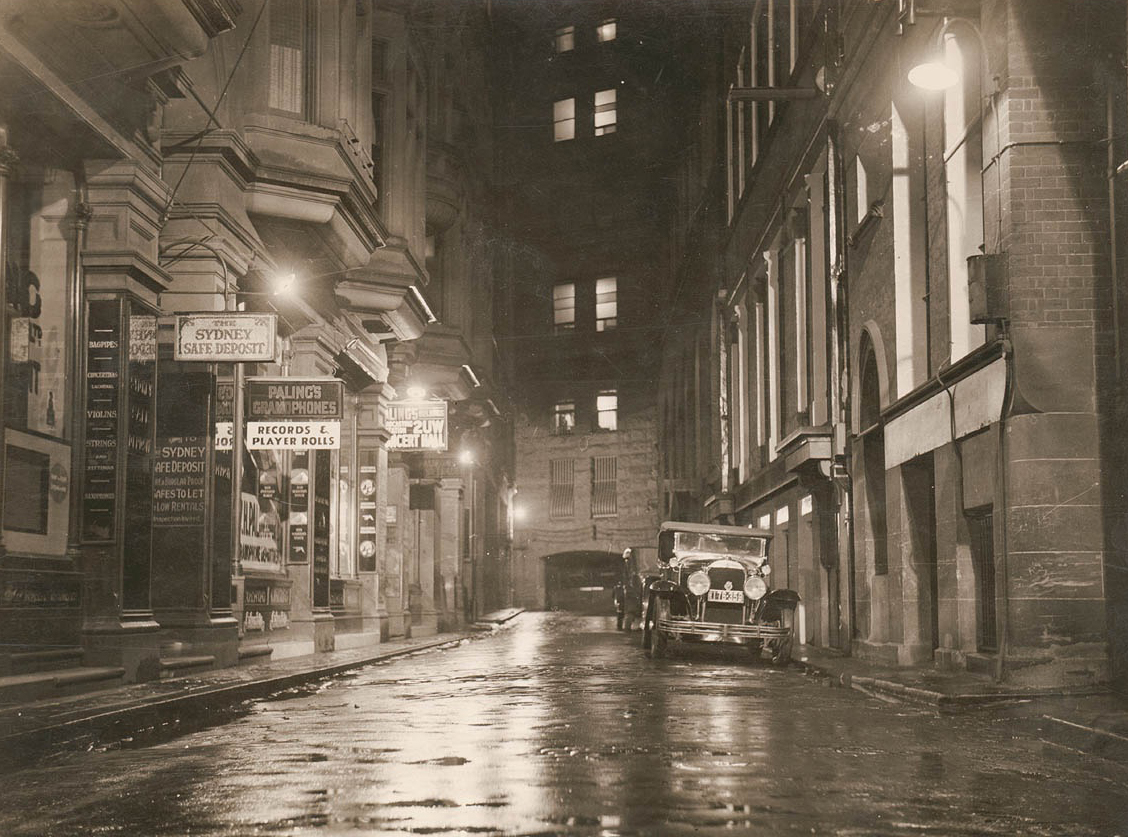
Entrance to 2UW on left opposite the car, 1930s

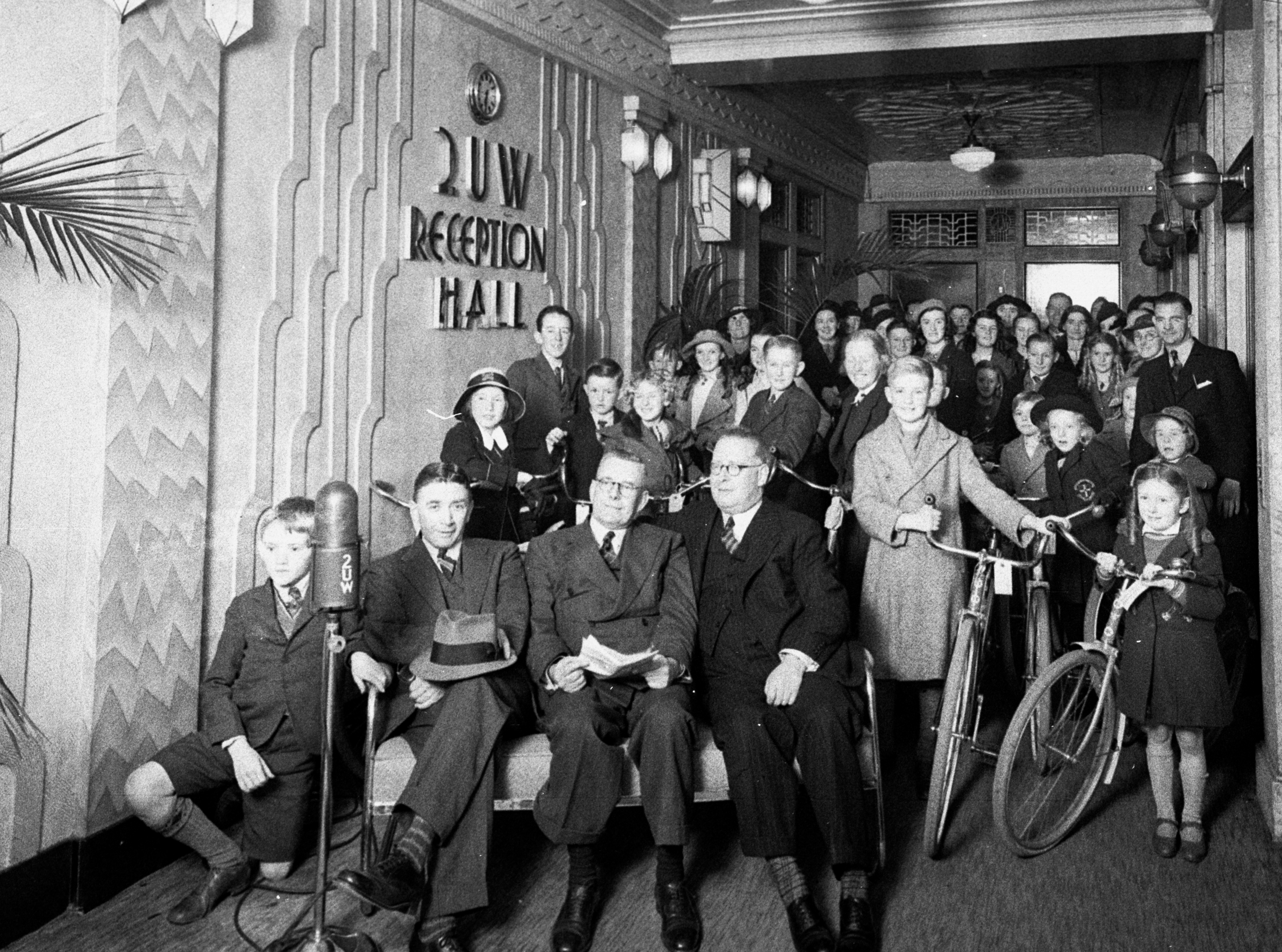
July 1938: Children who entered an adventure story competition on 2UW receive Malvern Star bicycles from champion cyclist Hubert Opperman (extreme right)

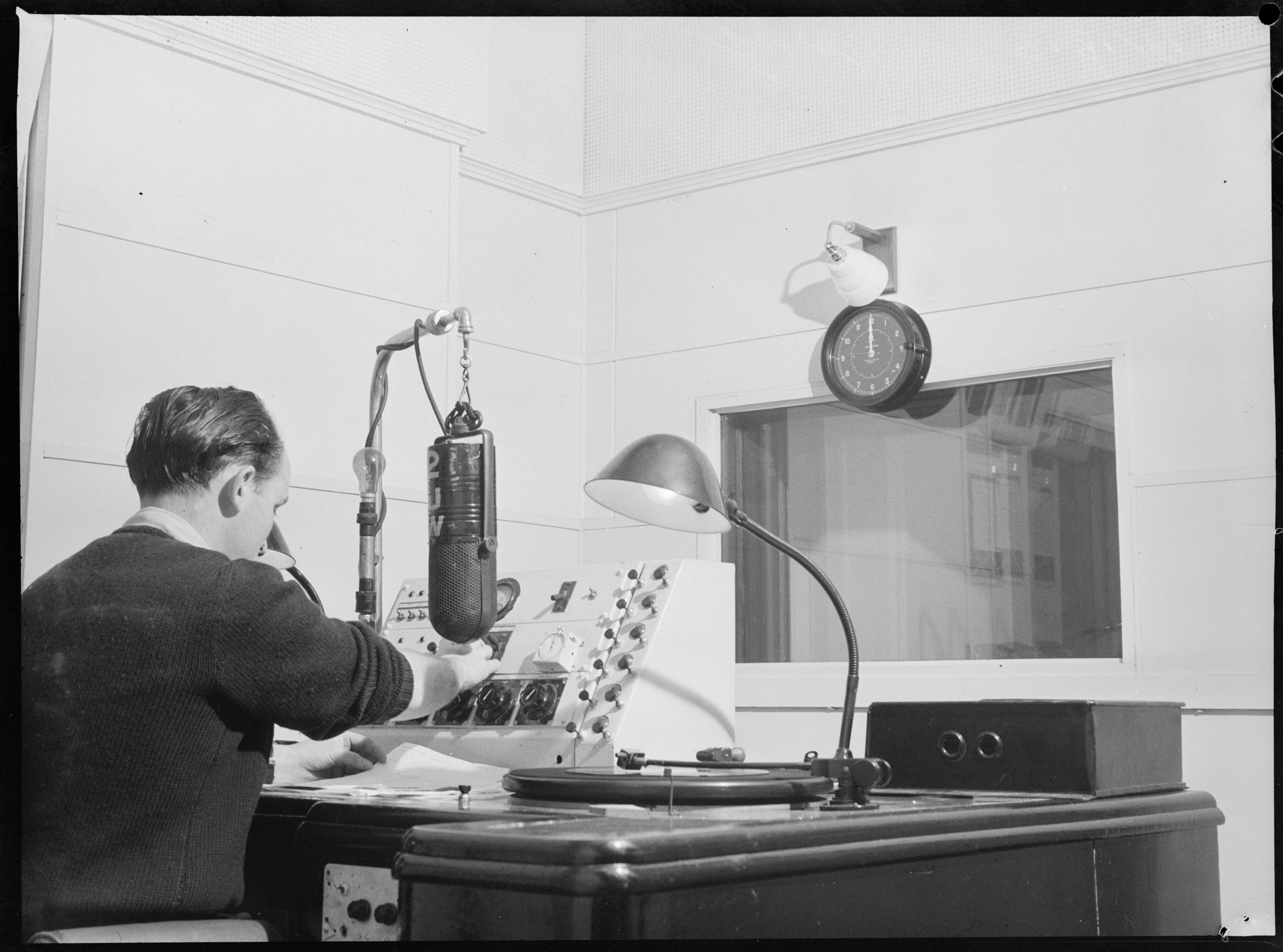
Nightshift begins for radio disc jockey, Sydney, 1949

The station, now known as KIIS, began life as 2UW, commencing transmission on 13 February 1925 on 1125 kHz on the AM band. On 1 September 1935, the frequency changed to 1110 kHz and in 1978 changed again to 1107 kHz. 2UW was the home of many live radio plays and had studios for live programmes at Market Street in Sydney, near the intersection with George Street.

The management of 2UW moved the station to 365 Kent Street, Sydney although for a time they retained the Market Street live audience theatre that had been used for live plays. One of its early breakfast presenters, Russ Walkington, had a character known as Gerald the Grasshopper who pre-dated Sammy Sparrow who appeared on 2UE with Gary O'Callaghan. In 1935 it became the first radio station outside the United States (and thus the first in both the British Empire and the Southern Hemisphere) to broadcast 24 hours a day. During the 1940s and 1950s the format spread throughout the country and by the end of the 1960s, almost all commercial radio stations in Australia were broadcasting day-round.

From the early 1960s, 2UW moved away from its older audience and actively pursued the youth market through the introduction of a Top 40 format in response to the music coming from the United States and Great Britain and to provide a vehicle for the up-and-coming Australian local rock scene.

2UW was one of the most innovative AM radio stations in Australia during the mid-1960s through to the early 1970s thanks to the programming of Ray Bean. Ray introduced the NEW2UW (spoken as "new U-W") '1110' men comprising announcers John Melouney (breakfast), John Thompson (morning), Tony McLaren (afternoon), Ward "Pally" Austin (drive time), Rod Christopher (early evening), and Jeff Hall (late nights and Dial A Hit on Saturday nights). They were later joined by 'Baby' John Burgess, Donnie Sutherland, Phil Hunter, Gary Stewart, Graham Sawyer and a range of others, including Malcolm T. Elliott, who took Top 40 radio to a new level as part of the NEW2UW format being broadcast from the Kent Street studios in Sydney. The '1110 men' also took their music to the streets with promotions in such places as beaches, parks and shopping centres. One of the most successful promotions was the NEW2UW studio at the Sydney Royal Easter Show at the old RAS showgrounds at Moore Park. This provided a unique opportunity for the radio station's stars to mingle with their listeners. In 1969 the NEW2UW managed to lure announcer John Laws from his drive time slot at 2UE and gave Laws his first morning programme in Sydney radio which was an immediate success, but also brought much confusion to the audience as the radio station went through a series of breakfast announcers and format changes which sought to capitalise on the success of the John Laws programme, while trying to hang on its huge audience - many of whom were not ready for the introduction of talk-back radio by their beloved NEW2UW.

The NEW2UW had a close association with the Daily Telegraph and Sunday Telegraph and operated a news service from its own Kent Street studios and a news studio in the Daily Telegraph Building in Park Street Sydney when the Telegraph papers were owned by Sir Frank Packer. The NEW2UW newsroom was operated by Don Rodgers a newspaper journalist who served Prime Ministers Chifley and Curtin during the Second World War as their press secretary. Don's style was very much in the mould of newspaper reporting, but he instilled in his staff the fundamentals of accuracy and clarity in their reporting.

In late January 1984, 2UW was rebranded as Magic 11 with Ron E Sparks hosting the Morning Zoo. (Note: attributed to multiple references:) but the name was reverted by September according to reports by The Sydney Morning Herald. By 1985, it rebranded as "Better Music 2UW" targeting a 18-40 year old demographic.

=== Mix 106.5 ===
2UW was one of two Sydney AM radio stations to be successful in bidding for the right to convert to FM, and on 30 April 1994 commenced transmission on 106.5 MHz on the FM band. The familiar 2UW call sign was now broadcasting as Mix 106.5, adopting its name and logo from WWMX in the United States. The official callsign became 2WFM, though this was not used on-air. The 1107 kHz frequency is now assigned to SBS Radio.

The new station was positioned as "Sydney's Best Mix from the '70s, '80s and '90s" with an adult contemporary music format. In 2000 the station dropped 70's music from its playlist. The only announcer to remain at the station through 2UW's relaunches, and the subsequent FM conversion, was Trevor Sinclair. Sinclair departed the station in 2001.

A further relaunch of the station took place in 2004, with parent company ARN consolidating branding across its Mix Network of stations. In conjunction with new programming and aiming to attract a younger demographic, the station adopted the positioner "Sydney. Feel Good".

In 2010, Mix 106.5 went with a revamp of the station in conjunction with new shows and music demographic. Among those changes was the new slogan "Sydney's Fresh Mix". Having limited success in 2010, by 20 December the station had revived its position to "Sydney's Best Mix of the '80s, '90s and Now", with the return of Love Songs during the day.

On 30 January 2013, the station again revamped with a new programming line-up. Breakfast was presented by Sami Lukis and Yumi Stynes, with Tim 'Rosso' Ross presenting a drive show networked to Mix 101.1 Melbourne.

=== KIIS 1065 ===
In November 2013, The Kyle & Jackie O Show departed the breakfast timeslot at rival station 2Day FM. ARN quickly announced that show would be moving to "a whole new radio station" on 106.5FM in 2014. With the announcement came speculation that the station would be rebranded as KIIS FM, borrowing its name from KIIS-FM Los Angeles. On 8 December, ARN confirmed that Mix 106.5 would be relaunched in 2014 as KIIS 1065, with Kyle & Jackie O taking over the breakfast time slot and syndicating their evening version of their program to ARN's sister Mix stations.

KIIS 1065 was launched at 5:54 am, 20 January 2014. Shortly after the name change was announced, Melbourne narrowcaster Kiss FM launched the "Kiss Off ARN" campaign, stating that ARN's new branding was a breach of their trademark, and that the station would be pursuing legal action. However, in February 2014, the two parties reached a "confidential agreement", and the issue never made it to court.

In November 2014, a 30-second ad on KIIS in breakfast cost $1225 and in drive cost $895 (with KIIS holding a 9.8% and 8.4% share respectively in these slots at the time). Also in November, parent company Australian Radio Network announced that former Nova 100 breakfast team Hughesy & Kate would replace Rosso on Drive in 2015. The show commenced on 27 January 2015, anchored by former 90.9 Sea FM and 2DayFM announcer Matty Acton.

The Kyle and Jackie O Show ceased broadcasting on KIIS 1065 in February 2026 following the departures of Kyle Sandilands and Jackie O. After several months of speculation regarding a replacement breakfast lineup, ARN announced on 21 September 2026 that Dr Chris Brown, Amy Gerard and Jack Charles would host the station's new breakfast program, KIIS Breakfast with Chris, Amy & Jack. The show is scheduled to launch on 9 November 2026, succeeding The Kyle and Jackie O Show. This comes a week after Will & Woody was axed on 10 September.

== Studios ==
- Kent Street, Sydney (1959–1981)
- Neutral Bay (1981–2002)
- North Ryde (2002–2024)
- North Sydney (2024–present)

2UW was previously located at 365 Kent Street, Sydney, before relocating to 11 Rangers Road, Neutral Bay in 1981, followed by 3 Byfield Street, North Ryde in 2002.
