= KIIS Network =

Network of Australian radio stations

KIIS FM
- Country: Australia
- Broadcast area: Sydney (KIIS 106.5); Melbourne (KIIS 101.1); Brisbane (KIIS 97.3); Adelaide (KIIS 102.3); Perth (KIIS Perth)

Programming
- Language: English
- Format: Top 40 (CHR)

Ownership
- Owner: ARN

History
- Launch date: 2015
- Replaced: Mix Network

Coverage
- Stations: See list

The KIIS Network is a network of Australian commercial radio stations owned and operated by the ARN. Formerly branded as the Mix Network, the network was rebranded as the KIIS Network in 2015 following the relaunch of KIIS 101.1 Melbourne. The KIIS Network is named after KIIS-FM, a Los Angeles based pop radio station broadcast on the 102.7 MHz FM band.

== History ==
In November 2014, ARN announced that from January 2015 a year after the demise of Mix 101.1 in Melbourne and the successful rebranding of KIIS 106.5 in Sydney earlier that year, the Mix Network would be rebranded as the KIIS Network, with KIIS 101.1 alongside KIIS 106.5, 97.3FM and Mix 102.3. The Brisbane and Adelaide stations retained their respective station names and music formats, but adopted the same branding themes inline with their KIIS sister stations. Mix 106.3 in Canberra is also a part of the network, but predominantly carries its own programming. An announcement of their branding being realigned to the rest of the KIIS Network was made in December 2019.

In December 2014, it was announced that Fairfax Media would merge with the Macquarie Radio Network and sell 96FM Perth to ARN. In January 2015, 96FM joined the KIIS Network.

In January 2022, it was announced that Brisbane's 97.3FM would rebrand to KIIS 97.3, following the acquisition of Grant Broadcasters by ARN.

On 19 January 2026, Adelaide's Mix 102.3 was rebranded as KIIS 102.3, and 96FM left the KIIS Network to join the Gold Network. KIIS DAB+ launched in Perth as a replacement.

== Current stations ==
As of 19 January 2026, the KIIS Network consists of five main radio stations.

Station	Location(s)	Music format(s)
KIIS Perth	Perth	Top 40 (CHR)
KIIS 97.3	Brisbane	Top 40 (CHR)
KIIS 101.1	Melbourne	Top 40 (CHR)
KIIS 106.5	Sydney	Top 40 (CHR)
KIIS 102.3	Adelaide	Top 40 (CHR)

Mix 106.3 Canberra is a joint-venture with Southern Cross Austereo and programmed as part of the Triple M network. However, it does air some networked programming from joint venture partner ARN (The Christian O'Connell Show from Gold 104.3 Melbourne and Jonesy & Amanda from Gold 101.7 Sydney) until 2022, In March 2022, the station switched from the KIIS Network to the Gold Network due to its format shifting towards classic hits, with shows like the Kyle & Jackie O Hour of Power replaced by Jonesy & Amanda's JAM Nation.

== Digital radio ==
The KIIS Network simulcasts each station in the network on DAB+ digital radio in their local markets. It also broadcasts in a joint venture with the Gold Network, the adult contemporary-formatted Chemist Warehouse Remix. The KIIS Network stations are also available online via iHeartRadio.

On DAB+ in all markets (except Perth and Canberra), the KIIS Network operates a '90s pop digital station branded as KIIS 90s, alongside an '80s pop station in Brisbane, Adelaide and Perth. On 19 January 2026, it moved to the Gold Network and was rebranded as Gold 80s.

=== Digital-only stations ===
Station	Music format(s)	Location
KIIS 90s	1990s music	Sydney, Melbourne, Brisbane, Adelaide and Perth
KIIS Australia	Aussie hits	Melbourne only
KIIS Dance	Non-stop dance	Melbourne and Gold Coast Only
KIIS X (upcoming)	TBA	

== Former stations ==
Two stations were previously part of the KIIS Network.

Station	Location(s)	Music format(s)	Notes
96FM	Perth	Adult contemporary, Mainstream rock	Now part of Gold Network
96FM 80s	Perth	1980s music	Now part of Gold Network

== Networked shows ==
- KIIS Breakfast* (from KIIS 106.5 Sydney / KIIS 101.1 Melbourne)
- Gordie Waters^ (from KIIS 106.5 Sydney)
- Will & Woody (from KIIS 101.1 Melbourne)
- The Smallzy Show (from KIIS 106.5 Sydney)
- Lowie Live (from KIIS 97.3 Brisbane)
- Ben & Liam in the Morning (from KIIS 102.3 Adelaide)
- TikTok Trending with Ula (from KIIS 106.5 Sydney)

*Sydney and Melbourne
^Except Adelaide

== Local shows ==
KIIS 97.3 - Brisbane

- Robin, Kip & Corey Oates
- Georgie Marckwald

KIIS 102.3 - Adelaide

- KIIS Workdays with Burgo

== See also ==
- List of radio stations in Australia
