= List of Australian podcasts =

The following is a list of Australian podcasts in Wikipedia articles.

== List ==
Podcast	Year	Starring, Narrator(s), or Host(s)	Produced by	Ref
Casefile	2016–		Independent	
Conversations	2020–	Richard Fidler and Sarah Kanowski	ABC Radio National	
Crime Insiders	2023–	Brent Sanders and Kathryn Fox	LiSTNR, Southern Cross Austereo	
CrossBread	2019	Tom Wright	ABC Comedy	
Hamish & Andy	2006–	Hamish Blake and Andy Lee	LiSTNR	
The Health Report	2020– (program since 1985)	Norman Swan and Tegan Taylor	ABC Radio National	
If You're Listening	2019–	Matt Bevan	ABC	
Late Night Live	c. 2019–	Phillip Adams to July 2024; David Marr from July 2024	ABC Radio National	
Listen Carefully	2023–	Nathan Jolly	Independent	
Not Stupid	2024–	Jeremy Fernandez, Julia Baird	ABC	
StarStuff	2006– (program since 1998)	Stuart Gary	ABC NewsRadio (2006–2008); ABC Science Online (2008–2015); Independent (2016–)	
The Teacher's Pet	2018	Hedley Thomas	The Australian	
The Wheeler Centre	2022–	Multiple	The Wheeler Centre	
200 Plus	2022–	Nick Butler, Sam Draper, Charlie Comben, Max Lynch	Clubby Sports	
Who The Hell Is Hamish?	2019	Greg Bearup	The Australian	

== See also ==
- List of Australian crime podcasts
