= Who the Hell Is Hamish? (TV series) =

Australian television series

- Genre: True crime drama
- Created by: Adam Zwar
- Based on: Who the Hell Is Hamish? by Greg Bearup
- Written by: Adam Zwar
- Directed by: Jeffrey Walker
- Starring: Dominic Cooper; Claire van der Boom; Simone Kessell; Kate Jenkinson; Marta Dusseldorp; Joel Jackson; Remy Hii
- Country of origin: Australia
- Original language: English

Production
- Executive producers: Tracey Robertson; Nathan Mayfield; Tracey Vieira
- Camera setup: Multi-camera
- Running time: 60 minutes
- Production companies: Hoodlum Entertainment; CBS Studios

Original release
- Network: Paramount+

Who The Hell is Hamish? is an upcoming Australian true crime drama television series for Paramount+, which is set to be released on 10 December 2026. The series is produced by Hoodlum Entertainment and CBS Studios. It is based on actual events about the story of fraudster Hamish McLaren, who defrauded a group of people until they ultimately turned on him.

== Plot ==
When Hamish meets Bec, a recently divorced single mother with three sons and access to a significant family trust, Hamish's lies eventually don't add up when Bec notices his story is bogus as the pattern of deception begins to lead to more than $70 million going missing.

== Cast ==
- Dominic Cooper as Hamish McLaren
- Claire van der Boom as Bec
- Simone Kessell
- William McKenna
- Kate Jenkinson
- Marta Dusseldorp
- Miah Madden
- Fraser Anderson
- Yasmin Kassim
- Doris Younane
- Maria Angelico
- John Howard
- Andrea Moor
- Joel Jackson
- Remy Hii
- Damien Garvey
- Jack LaTorre
- Harvey Bowen

== Production ==
On 6 July 2026, it was reported that the series based on the successful podcast series of the same name was in active pre-production in Queensland.

On 12 August 2026, it was announced that the series had officially wrapped filming in Queensland, after spending over five years in development before securing funding from Screen Queensland and Screen Australia. The series is written by Adam Zwar and directed by Jeffrey Walker.

In November 2026, it was announced that the series would be released on 10 December 2026.
