= Hamish & Andy (radio show) =

Australian radio show created by and starring Hamish Blake & Andy Lee

- Running time: 2 hours
- Country of origin: Australia
- Home station: Fox FM
- Syndicates: Hit Network
- Hosted by: Hamish Blake; Andy Lee; Jack Post
- Recording studio: Melbourne
- Original release: 2006–2010; 6 July 2015 – 1 December 2017
- Opening theme: "Turn It Up" by Ugly Duckling

Hamish & Andy was a radio show hosted by Australian comedy duo Hamish & Andy, which ran from 2006 to 2013, and then again from 2015 to 2017. Originating on Fox FM, it was broadcast nationally on the Hit Network from 2007 to 2010 in the weekday drive time slot. The show was the highest-rated radio series in Australian history, consistently gaining up to 20% market share in the crucial Melbourne market, with around 2.7 million listeners and one million podcast downloads each week. The duo retired from the show at the end of 2017 before it returned in a weekly podcast-only format from 2018.

== Team ==
The Hamish & Andy radio team primarily consisted of:

- Hamish Blake – host
- Andy Lee – host
- Jack Post – co-host
- Horgs (Michael Horgan) – inventor
- Web Geezer Jez (Jeremy Carne) – web producer
- Radio Mike (Mike Liberale) – producer, co-host

== Weekday shows (2006–2010) ==
=== Release ===
The first iteration of the Hamish & Andy radio show was broadcast on weekdays in a two-hour drive time slot, beginning in 2006. In less than six months, Southern Cross Austereo decided to broadcast the show Australia-wide, becoming one of the country's first national drive shows.

In 2009, the show won Best Networked Program at the Australian Commercial Radio Awards, as well as Best On-Air Team. By the end of the year, the show was syndicated being internationally, in a weekly highlights package for 18 stations across New Zealand, as well as Dubai through the Arabian Radio Network. CEO of the network, Steve Smith, stated "in my 20 years in radio Hamish & Andy are the most talented duo I've seen come out of Australia – their dominant ratings over the past two years plus their ability to make everyday life hilarious will certainly go down well here". In June 2010, the Hamish & Andy show started to broadcast on Sunday nights in the United Kingdom on Absolute Radio, with Dave Cameron, head of the show's network, hinting at future international syndications – "the U.K. broadcast is the next step towards getting their show known and loved globally".

In August 2010, the duo announced they would retire from daily broadcasting to focus on their television careers, producing one radio show per week instead. They began in Perth on 29 November 2010, where over 3,500 fans attended in 37 °C heat. On 3 December 2010, the duo broadcast their final daily programme from Melbourne's Sidney Myer Music Bowl, where they were hosting a free farewell concert. Over 7,000 fans attended the event, which included a surprise appearance by Irish rock band U2. As of 2010, the show had attracted an average of 2.2 million listeners nationally.

=== Notable activities ===
- Fred Basset – In 2006, Blake and Lee adopted a greyhound dog and named it Fred Basset, after the comic strip character of the same name. He was purchased using proceeds from Blake betting $800, which was originally put aside for a holiday with his girlfriend, on Lee being named Cleo's Bachelor of the Year. Half of Basset's winnings went to the Greyhound Adoption Program.
- Conjoined twins – In 2007, after accidentally offending a radio listener while talking about conjoined twins, Hamish and Andy were sewn into a suit together for a week. They were detached on Rove on the Sunday.
- Afghanistan broadcast – In April 2008, the duo travelled to Afghanistan and performed their show live alongside Australian soldiers. The trip was first instigated when the duo received an email from an Australian soldier serving overseas, excited about hearing The Hamish & Andy Show at his base. The letter opened discussion of whether the show should go overseas and broadcast with the troops. The duo were given permission after contacting the Australian Defence Force several times.
- The People's Chip – Partnering with snack company Smith's, the duo invented and launched a new gravy-flavoured crisp, nicknamed "the People's Chip". It was launched on 27 June 2008 in an event with hundreds of viewers which included a performance from Melissa Tkautz and appearance by Brian McFadden.
- BYO Pool Party – The duo celebrated the final show of 2009 with live performances by Powderfinger and the John Butler Trio at Hickson Road Resort. Listeners of the show brought paddling pools which were filled up at the venue.
- Sandra Bullock – In 2010, the duo entered Stock & Land's competition to win a Moyle Pathfinder Angus Bull worth $6,000 so they could become "bull-ionaires". They enlisted listeners to collect four weekly coupons to enter, but when they didn't win, they made contact with the winners to ask them to name the bull Sandra Bullock.
- Random John – A regular game played on the show which would see the duo call a random number, hoping a person named John would pick up. If this happened, they would earn one John Point. This happened for the first and only time on 27 May 2011.
- Caravan of Courage
  - Caravan of Courage – In October 2007, Hamish and Andy set out on their Caravan of Courage trip in an attempt to "hug" Australia, with the intention of travelling from Perth to Brisbane and visiting many small towns that do not typically receive tourist recognition along the way. They broadcast their radio show from wherever they were at 4 pm each day. Locations they broadcast from included Southern Cross, Norseman and Cocklebiddy from Western Australia, Taliem Bend from South Australia, Donald and Benalla from Victoria, and Goulburn and Bulahdelah from New South Wales. The trip won the duo Best Station Promomotion at the ACRA Awards.
  - Caravan of Courage 2: Who Dares Dar-Wins – On 27 October 2008, the duo embarked on a second journey from Melbourne to Darwin, with some listeners recruited to join them. Locations they broadcast from included Nhill in Victoria, Roxby Downs and Coober Pedy from South Australia, Yalara (Uluru), Aileron, Darwin and Mataranka from the Northern Territory.
  - Caravan of Courage 3: Yes We Van – From August 2009, the duo began a broadcast two-week road trip across the United States in a van called the "Abra-van Lincoln". Locations they broadcast from included Dade City in Florida, Andalusia in Alabama, Laurel in Mississippi, Magdalena in New Mexico and Show Low in Arizona.
  - Caravan of Courage 4: Great Britain and Ireland – From 31 May to 11 June 2010, the duo embarked on a fourth caravan adventure across Great Britain and Ireland, in a van called "Sir Van-celot". The trip was broadcast in the United Kingdom on Absolute Radio.

== Friday show (2011–2012) ==
From 2011 until the end of 2012, the show was broadcast every Friday.

It was announced on 23 November 2012 that Hamish & Andy would be restructured into two different shows in 2013 – the regular drive show from 4pm–6pm on Monday, and another, Business Brunch, from 9am–10am from Tuesday to Friday. The format of this new programme was pre-recorded, and the duo aimed to cover just one topic per show.

== Return to weekday shows (2015–2017) ==
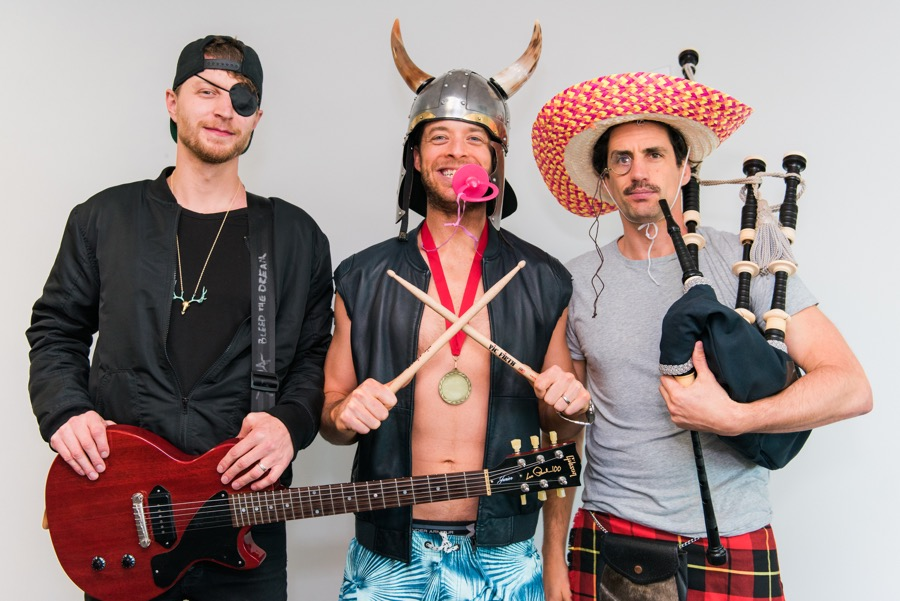
Cool Boys and the Frontman. Jack Post, Hamish Blake, Andy Lee

=== Release ===
In October 2014 it was announced the duo would return to their weekly drive time slot on the Hit Network from 6 July 2015. They would also publish a podcast of each show, excluding the live broadcast's commercials and songs.

In 2016, the duo announced that 2017 would be their final year on radio, and that they would be retiring to focus on their television careers once more. Their final radio show was broadcast live from Margaret Court Arena on 1 December 2017. Their show's final episodes that year received an estimated 30 million podcast downloads.

=== Notable activities ===
- Race That Slows Down the Nation – In 2015, Hamish & Andy ran a horse suit race in the country town of Wedderburn, Victoria, on the Monday before the Melbourne Cup. The race was originally designed to include horses, but as more and more people started to write to the show asking if they could enter the race in a horse outfit, Hamish & Andy later changed the rules to be a horse suit only race.
- Eating the Board – In 2017, Hamish & Andy attempted to eat all of the items on the McDonald's menu. After much discussion, the finalised menu involved 22 items – notably the Chicken & Cheese and the McFeast. 58 minutes into the challenge, while attempting to "rampage" the rest of his Quarter Pounder, Andy threw up and the challenge was over.
- Crowd Surfing Show – On Thursday 4 May 2017, Hamish & Andy did their entire two-hour show while crowd surfing on an inflatable raft. Blake surfed the crowd on his electronic drum kit, and both beat the world record for the fastest 50 metre crowd surf, with Blake dressed as Jasmine and Lee dressed as Aladdin on a magic carpet.
- Operation: Dry Tank – The duo wondered how far it was possible to drive once a car's fuel light claimed to have zero kilometres left. "The race that stops the car" took place on 7 November 2017, with the results of the experiment airing the next day. After initially thinking they would only be able to drive for 14 kilometres, they managed to drive for nearly two hours and 111.9 kilometres.

== Compilations ==
Hamish and Andy have released two ARIA Award-winning double-disc compilation albums, featuring highlights from The Hamish & Andy Show.

List of Hamish & Andy compilation albums with selected chart positions, certifications and awards shown
Title	Details	AUS Album Chart Peak	AUS End of Year Album Chart Position	ARIA Certification	ARIA Awards
Unessential Listening	Released: 29 November 2008; Label: Austereo/Roadshow Music/Sony BMG (301441-2); Format: CD, digital download	4	22	Platinum	2009 Best Comedy Release Winner
Celebrating 50 Glorious Years	Released: 26 November 2010; Label: Austereo/Roadshow Music/Sony (301597-2); Format: CD, digital download	6	56	Gold	2011 Best Comedy Release Winner

== Awards and nominations ==
=== Australian Commercial Radio Awards ===
List of accolades received by Hamish and Andy at the Australian Commercial Radio Awards
Year	Award	Work	Result
2016	Best Station Promotion (Metro)	Hamish & Andy: The Race That Slows Down The Nation	Won
2016	Best Networked Program (Metro)	The Hamish & Andy Show	Won
2016	Best Marketing Campaign (Metro)	Hamish & Andy: Hamish & Andy Return	Won
2016	Best Multimedia Execution (Metro)	Hamish & Andy: The Ed Sheeran $2 Peep Show Experiment	Won
2016	Best On-Air Team – FM (Metro)	The Hamish & Andy Show	Nominated
2016	Best Station Produced Comedy Segment (Metro)	Hamish & Andy: Jazz Chat Prank	Nominated
2016	Best Show Producer (Metro)	Hamish & Andy: Sam Cavanagh	Nominated
2016	Best Sales Promotion (Metro)	Hamish & Andy: Tip Top Citizen Swap	Nominated
2017	Best Station Produced Comedy Segment (Metro)	Hamish & Andy: Australia's Best Bloke	Won
2017	Best Station Promotion (Metro)	Hamish & Andy: The People's Cruise	Won
2017	Best On-Air Team – FM (Metro)	The Hamish & Andy Show	Nominated
2017	Best Networked Program (Metro)	The Hamish & Andy Show	Nominated

== See also ==
- Hamish & Andy (podcast)
- List of Australian podcasts
- Cool Boys and the Frontman
