= Alex Graham =

Alex Graham may refer to:

- Alex Graham (footballer) (1889–1972), Scottish footballer
- Alex Graham (producer) (born 1953), journalist and British independent television producer
- Alex Graham (cartoonist) (1913–1991), British cartoonist

== See also ==
- Alec Graham (1929–2021), English Anglican bishop
