= Claire van der Boom =

Australian actress (born 1983)

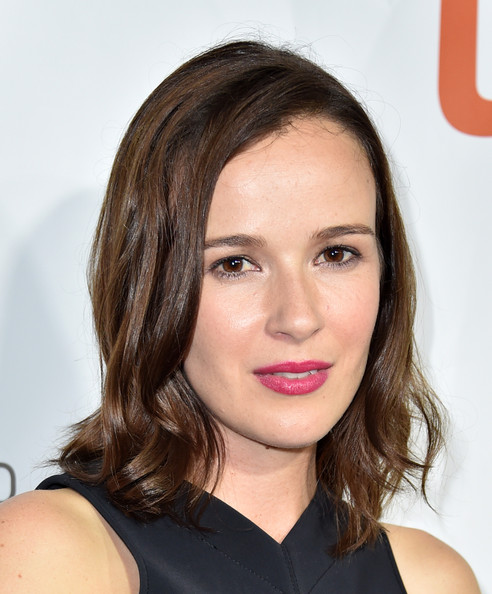
- Van der Boom at the premiere of Ruth & Alex in 2014
- Born: 21 November 1983 (age 43); Broome, Western Australia, Australia
- Occupation: Actress
- Years active: 2003–present

Claire van der Boom (born 21 November 1983) is an Australian actress. She first became known to Australian audiences for her roles in the TV series Love My Way and East West 101. In 2008, she starred in the Australian neo-noir thriller The Square. Internationally, she is best known for her appearance as Stella Karamanlis in the HBO miniseries The Pacific, and her recurring role of Rachel in the 2010 remake of Hawaii Five-O.

== Early life and education ==
Van der Boom was born in Broome, Western Australia. She attended Presbyterian Ladies' College in Perth, where she studied drama, graduating in 1999. She graduated from the National Institute of Dramatic Art (NIDA) in 2005.

== Career ==
=== Acting career ===
Following graduation, van der Boom appeared in the Australian TV series Love My Way and East West 101. Her first major role in a feature film was in The Square, opposite Joel Edgerton and directed by Nash Edgerton. It premiered at the Sydney Film Festival in June 2008. It was released in the US in 2010 by Apparition.

Van der Boom had a role in the Steven Spielberg-produced mini-series The Pacific. This 10-part series, which is a follow-up to Band of Brothers, was largely filmed in Australia and was released internationally in March 2010. The role of Stella required her to speak Greek.

In 2008, van der Boom appeared as Grace Barry in the Australian police drama Rush, but her character was killed off in episode 11, which aired 11 November 2008. Josef Ber's character, Sergeant Dominic "Dom" Wales, was originally scripted to be killed off. However, during production of the first season, van der Boom had her US green card approved which required her to relocate. She was nominated for a TV week Silver Logie for her work.

Van der Boom starred in the 2010 psychological thriller Red Hill, opposite Ryan Kwanten and directed by Patrick Hughes. Also in 2010 she starred in the comedic LGBT short 'Baby Cake' which screened at multiple festivals. In 2010, she portrayed Sister Berenice Twohill in the telemovie Sisters of War, directed by Brendan Maher, for which she won a Logie Award for Most Outstanding Actress in 2011.

Van der Boom starred in the 2011 telemovie Underbelly Files: The Man Who Got Away, the true story of drug smuggler David McMillan. She played McMillan's lover Clelia Vigano. She played the role of reporter Juliette Gardner in the first three episodes of the Australian police procedural City Homicide; the episodes aired in February and March 2011. She portrayed the ex-wife of Danny Williams (Scott Caan) in the remake Hawaii Five-0 throughout the run of the series.

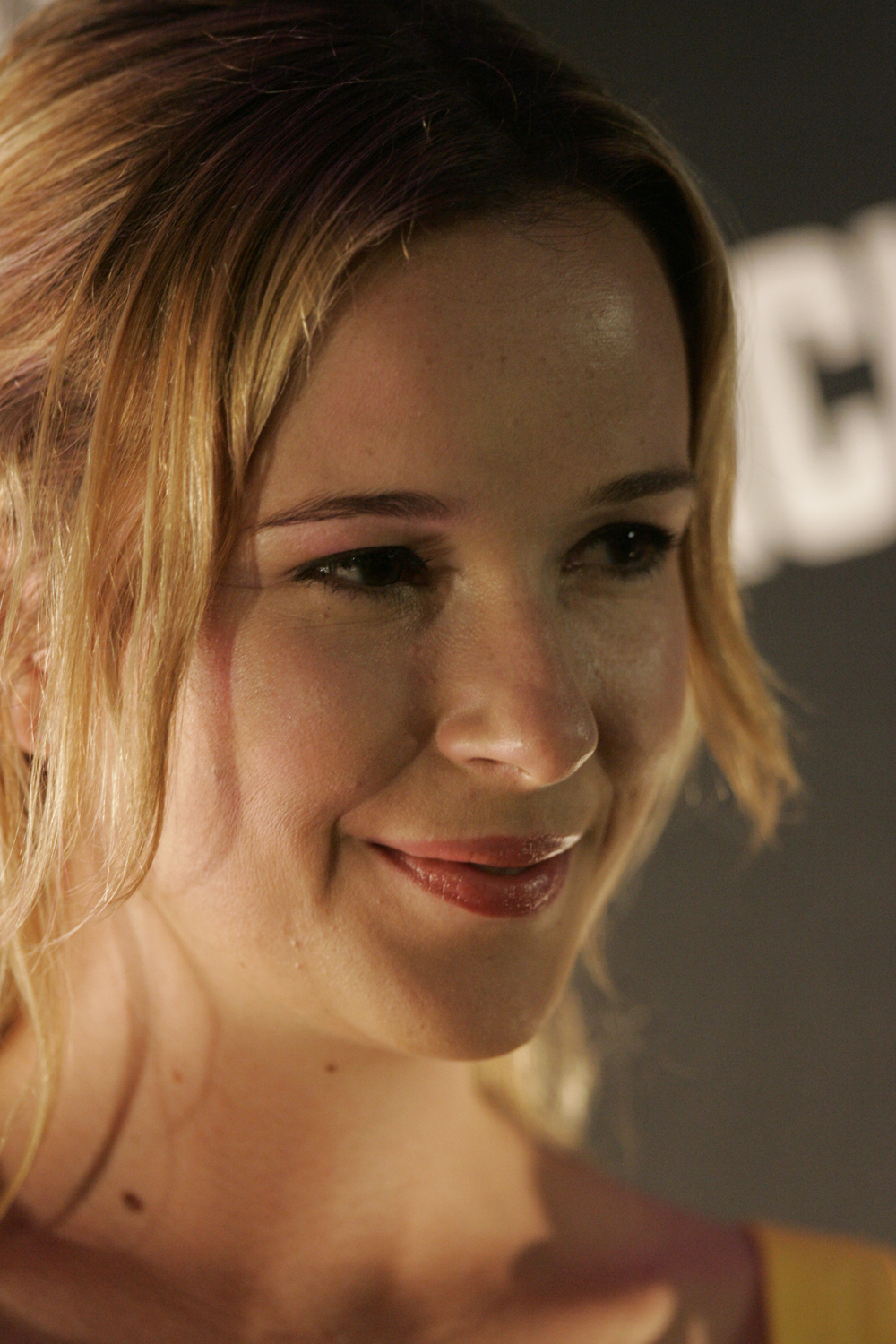
Van der Boom at the premiere of Jack Reacher in 2012

In 2012, van der Boom was cast in two Off-Broadway productions. She played 'Karen' in David Rabe's An Early History of Fire (The New Group) and took over the role of 'Sally' (originally played by Julianne Nicholson) in the extended season of Sam Shepard's Heartless (Signature Theatre). Van der Boom had previously worked with Shepard in Tough Trade, the original series pilot for Epix. She played Billie Tucker in the drama.

Van der Boom appeared in the 2015 film 5 Flights Up, starring Morgan Freeman and Diane Keaton, playing 'Young Ruth' to Keaton's 'Ruth'. In November 2014, Universal Pictures secured the international distribution rights to the Australian feature Love Is Now, starring van der Boom, Eamon Farren and Anna Torv. In 2015 she appeared in Stephen Suettinger's movie, A Year and Change as Vera.

In 2015, van der Boom appeared in Chronic, which won the Best Screenplay Award at the 2015 Cannes Film Festival. The same year, she was in the premiere of Scott Caan's play The Trouble With Where We Come From at The Falcon Theatre in Los Angeles.

In 2015, van der Boom appeared in the movie Broke, as Terri, the film directed by Heath Davis who along with Luke Graham and Carmel Leonard produced the film.

In 2016, she appeared in the coming-of-age film Dear Eleanor. She appeared in two episodes of Constantine, portraying the character of Anne-Marie who has secluded herself away from society in the guise of a Catholic nun in Mexico, as a result of the Newcastle incident. She was a series regular in the ten-part NBC series Game of Silence. Van der Boom also played Phyllis in the theatre adaptation of the crime novel Double Indemnity for the Melbourne Theatre Company.

In 2017, van der Boom starred in the romantic drama film Battlecreek, directed by Alison Eastwood. She also portrayed Penny Anderson in the 2023 film adaptation The Appleton Ladies' Potato Race.

In August 2026, van der Boom was named in the cast for the television adaptation of the podcast series Who the Hell Is Hamish?.

=== Music career ===
In 2003, van der Boom recorded vocals for a track titled "Do What You Want" produced by Jason Hearn. The track was later remixed by Infusion, Max Graham and Jacob Todd. The Infusion remix is featured on the critically acclaimed Balance 005 compilation mixed by James Holden. The Max Graham Afterhours In Montreal Mix is included on DJ Tiësto's 2005 album In Search of Sunrise 4: Latin America.

== Filmography ==
=== Film ===
Year	Title	Role	Notes
2005	Reflections	Kate	Short
2007	Katoomba	Annie	Short
2008	The Square	Carla Smith	
2009	Inside the Square	Herself	Video documentary short
2010	Red Hill	Alice Cooper	
2010	Baby Cake	Ruby	Short
2011	Engine Block	Dawn	Short
2012	Beneath the Sheets	Evelyn	Short
2013	Record	Sophie	Short
2014	Love Is Now	Audrey	Short
2014	Ruth & Alex	Young Ruth	
2015	Chronic	Alice	
2015	A Year and Change	Vera	
2016	Valley Heist	Michelle	Short
2016	Broke	Terri	
2016	Dear Eleanor	Caroline Potter	
2017	Battlecreek	Alison	
2019	American Exit	Sofia	
2019	Palm Beach	Holly	
2022	Blacklight	Amanda Block	
2023	The Appleton Ladies' Potato Race	Penny	

=== Television ===
Year	Title	Role	Notes
2003	The Shark Net	Woman Bowler	Episode: "Part 1"
2007	Love My Way	Billie	7 episodes
2008	East West 101	Elvira Todic	Episode: "Haunted by the Past"
2008	Rush	Grace Barry	11 episodes
2010–19	Hawaii Five-0	Rachel Edwards/Hollander	12 episodes
2010	25th Independent Spirit Awards	Herself	Television special
2010	The Pacific	Stella Karamanlis	Episode: "Melbourne"
2010	Sisters of War	Sister Berenice Twohill	Television movie
2010	Tough Trade	Billie Tucker	Television movie
2011	Underbelly Files: The Man Who Got Away	Clelia Vigano	Television movie
2011	City Homicide	Juliette Gardiner	3 episodes
2013	Masters of Sex	Shirley	Episode: "Involuntary"
2014	Low Life	Shelley	5 episodes
2014–15	Constantine	Anne Marie Flynn	2 episodes
2016	Game of Silence	Marina Nagle	10 episodes
2017	Pulse	Frankie Bell	8 episodes
2021	Kidnapped in Paradise	Savannah Duke-Morgan	Australian TV film
2021	Homespun	Sam	
2025-26	NCIS: Sydney	Harding	3 episodes
2026	Who the Hell Is Hamish?	Bec	TV series
2026	Shakedown	Rachelle Miller	TV mini series
