= I'll Be Seeing You (2004 film) =

- Written by: Jeff Cohen; John Benjamin Martin
- Directed by: Will Dixon
- Starring: Alison Eastwood; Iris Quinn; Mark Humphrey
- Theme music composer: Claude Foisy
- Country of origin: United States
- Original language: English

Production
- Producers: Bruce Cohn Curtis; Lance H. Robbins; Stephen Onda
- Editor: Dean Evans
- Running time: 96 minutes
- Budget: $3 million

Original release
- Network: PAX Network
- Release: May 1, 2004

I'll Be Seeing You, also known as Mary Higgins Clark's I'll Be Seeing You, is a 2004 television film based on the novel by Mary Higgins Clark starring Alison Eastwood and Mark Humphrey.

== Story ==
The film centers on Patricia Collins, a young woman whose father Burton has gone missing. Neither the police nor the insurance company believe him to be dead, particularly as he withdrew the face value of his life insurance policy days prior to his disappearance. This, along with the discovery of a dead woman named Annie on her property, prompts Patricia to begin investigating.

Her questioning leads Patricia to her father's business partner Phillip, through whom she meets Elaine, a fertility clinic worker who is later shot to death by a masked assailant. A former colleague of Elaine's is also murdered by the same assailant, after Patricia questions the colleague. Evidence found at the scenes of the murders point towards Burton being alive and the killer, something Patricia finds hard to believe. During the investigation Patricia also learns that her father had a second family and that Annie is her half sister. The money he withdrew was intended for Annie, as way to provide for her. Throughout all of this Patricia is unaware that she is being stalked by Bernie, a man who worked in the same office building as her father.

Patricia is eventually tricked into going to a remote cabin by the killer responsible for the other deaths, Phillip. As he prepares to murder her, Phillip reveals that he has been involved in shading dealings and he killed Elaine and the colleague to cover his tracks. He furthermore tells her that he killed her father because he learned of the dealings and threatened to expose him. Before Phillip can shoot Patricia he is killed by Bernie, who had been following them. Any relief is short lived, as Patricia recognizes him as an equal threat, especially after he reveals he had killed Annie after mistaking her for Patricia. Bernie soon realizes that Patricia does not return his affections and tries to kill her, only to be shot and killed by the police, who had been informed of Patricia's whereabouts. The film ends with all of the secrets finally revealed.

== Cast ==
- Alison Eastwood as Patricia Collins
- Mark Humphrey as Mac
- Bo Svenson as Philip
- Margot Kidder as Frances
- Iris Quinn as Catherine
- Richy Müller as Bernie

== Production ==
The film's plot required Eastwood to portray a corpse, something she stated was not easy as it required her to remain perfectly still and refrain from breathing. The weather also made filming some scenes difficult due to the cold.

== Release ==
I'll Be Seeing You premiered on May 1, 2004 on the PAX Network. In 2023 the film was released through Rifftrax with an accompanying synchronous commentary by Mary Jo Pehl and Bridget Jones Nelson.

== Reception ==
Critical reception was mixed. John Leonard of New York Magazine criticized the movie, writing that "like all previous Mary Higgins Clark TV movies, leaves almost everything to be desired." Kay Gardella of the Daily News was more favorable, stating "If you're a fan of the author, you'll enjoy this adaptation, especially the classy performance by Eastwood."
