= Power Play (2003 film) =

- Directed by: Joseph Zito
- Starring: Dylan Walsh; Alison Eastwood
- Cinematography: Gideon Porath
- Music by: Joseph Bishara
- Release date: April 25, 2003 (Japan)
- Running time: 100 minutes
- Country: United States
- Language: English

Power Play is a 2003 American action film directed by Joseph Zito and starring Dylan Walsh, Alison Eastwood, Tobin Bell and Brixton Karnes.

Some action scenes were filmed in Curitiba and several other cities in Paraná, that stood in for Tijuana, where part of the film is set.

== Plot ==
Journalist Matt Nash's (Dylan Walsh) investigations always get him in trouble. He is shot during his research in the drug scene and survives due to a bulletproof vest. The journal's editor-in-chief plans to fire him to preserve the good reputation of The Examiner. She gives him one last chance and charges him with a seemingly harmless job of finding three missing environmental activists. This trio previously penetrated into the headquarters of the power company known as Saturn Energy and stole data on a secret project. Here, the three activists are discovered and killed by employees of the company under the leadership of the security chiefs Clemens (Tobin Bell).

Matt makes contact with the group and is given access to a secret entrance to the company's premises outside the city. There he discovers that the company is searching for an alternative energy source. A trial operation quickly acquires access to the grid of Los Angeles, explaining the blackouts which have been affecting the town. The technique, however, has one major drawback: the production of energy creates a tremendous amount of heat that must be dissipated. It is conducted on the premises in the ground. In the ground beneath where the site is located, however, a crack develops, which leads to an uncontrolled discharge of the heat. An employee of the company finds out that in this way the chances are increased for an earthquake in town. He wants to warn the public of the experiments, but dies in an explosion.

Meanwhile, Matt has managed to win the trust of Gabrielle St. John (Alison Eastwood), a manager of the company. With their help, he discovers the crimes of the three environmental activists. Preparations for a last experiment in the research facility are in full swing. For the first time, the plant will continue at full speed. However, this threatens a massive earthquake that could destroy the entire city. Matt and Gabrielle again gain access to the research site. They manage to sabotage the test by turning off the coolant, thus allowing the heat the build up and cause the site to self-destruct. In the meantime. Clemens threatens to kill Gabriella and Matt jumps on top of him and they engage in a battle until Gabriella shoots Clemens with his own gun. In the meantime, the head of Saturn, the former secretary of the Department of Energy, tries to escape but when surrounded by patrol cars, he kills himself with a gun. Matt and Gabriella reunite and she tells him if the story got out, it would ruin her ability to carry on the work of Dr. Eisley and destroy his reputation. Matt tells her "There is no story," and fade out.

== Cast ==
- Dylan Walsh as Matt Nash
- Alison Eastwood as Gabriella St. John
- Tobin Bell as Clemens
- Brixton Karnes as Travis Gentry
- Frank Birney as D.C.
- Boti Bliss as Sara Rose
- Mark Hutter as Abbott
- Jan Munroe as McCullough
- Martin Papazian as Joel
- Victor Raider-Wexler as Dr. Eisley
- Kimi Reichenberg as Rita
- Paulo Reis as Zendon
- Marcia Strassman as Susan Breecher
- Jaimz Woolvett as Todd
- Julia Davis as LAPD Officer
- Andre Robinson as Detective

== Release ==
=== Reception ===
David Nusair from Reel Film Reviews gave the film 2 out of 4 stars. He praised Dylan Walsh's performance and wondered why he chose to act in such "typical straight-to-video action fare". Despite noting that the movie is "packed with an absurd amount of action movie clichés, to the point where the film occasionally feels like it's operating on the level of parody", he concluded that Power Play is "actually pretty entertaining, as far as films of this ilk go—provided you're not expecting anything more than an incredibly silly, over-the-top throwback to the action flicks of the '80s'".
