= Kari Nissena =

American actress, director, and producer

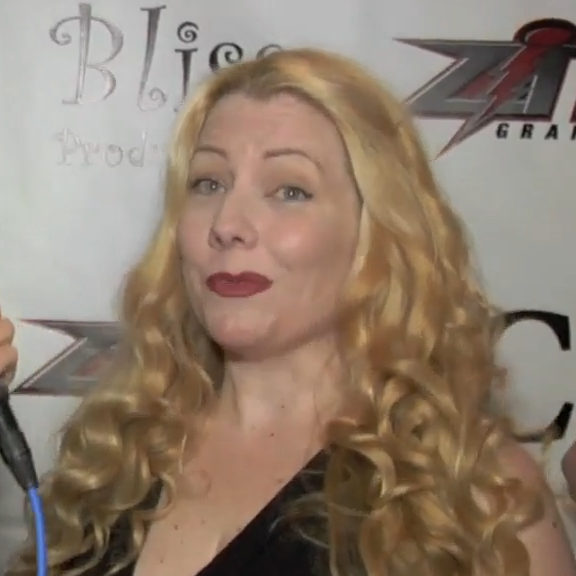
Nissena in 2010

Kari Nissena is an American actress, director, and producer. She both produced and starred in the award-winning 2006 film Cats on a Plane written by comedian Tim Powers. She won the Best Actress, Best Director, and Best Feature awards at the 2009 Oceanside International Film Festival. She also won Best Feature at the 2009 IndieFest USA.

== Filmography ==
=== Film ===
| Year | Title | Role | Notes |
|---|---|---|---|
| 2003 | Strange as Angels | Laura | |
| 2005 | Raw Footage | Viv's Friend | |
| 2008 | Humanity's End | Gorlock | |
| 2009 | Dear Lemon Lima | Norma | |
| 2009 | Callous | Tammy Young | |
| 2010 | Changing Hands | Alix | |
| 2011 | 11/11/11 | Sofie | |
| 2012 | Least Among Saints | Beth | |
| 2014 | Crossroads | Laura | |
| 2014 | Gone Doggy Gone | Command Center Chief | |
| 2017 | What a Great Idea | Kathy | |
| TBA | Fierce Target | MMA Gym Receptionist | |

=== Television ===
| Year | Title | Role | Notes |
|---|---|---|---|
| 2003 | What Should You Do? | Teacher | Episode: "Pencil in the Heart" |
| 2003 | Music Is a Joke! | Sally | Television film |
| 2004 | Nip/Tuck | Surgery Assistant | 2 episodes |
| 2004 | Huff | Margo | Episode: "Assault & Pepper" |
| 2008 | Just Jordan | Stage Manager | Episode: "Boogie Toasties" |
| 2012–2015 | Hollywood Inc. | Various roles | 23 episodes |
| 2013 | Social Nightmare | Dr. Greenberg | Television film |
| 2019 | The 12 Days of Christy | Christy | Miniseries |
