= Humanity's End =

- Theatrical poster
- Directed by: Neil Johnson
- Screenplay by: Michael Jonathan Smith; Neil Johnson
- Story by: Neil Johnson
- Produced by: Philip Burthem; Neil Johnson; Executive producer: Ray Haboush
- Starring: Jay Laisne; Kari Nissena; Rochelle Vallese; Cynthia Ickes; Blake Edgerton
- Narrated by: Neil Johnson
- Cinematography: Massimiliano Trevis
- Music by: Nedy John Cross
- Production companies: Morphius Film; Empire Motion Pictures; Halcyon International Pictures; Jomsviking Productions
- Distributed by: Maverick Entertainment Group, (USA); Krause & Schneider Multimedia, (Germany)
- Release date: September 1, 2009 (DVD)
- Running time: 80 minutes
- Country: United States
- Language: English
- Budget: US$100,000 (est)

Humanity's End is a 2009 American fantasy science fiction film directed by Neil Johnson. Based upon a story concept by Johnson, and with a screenplay by Johnson and Michael Jonathan Smith, the film stars Jay Laisne, Rochelle Vallese and Cynthia Ickes.

== Synopsis ==
Several hundred years into the future, mankind has been relegated to the position of a minority species being replaced by a clone-race called "Homo technis" or "Konstrukts" which is itself being supplanted by the genetically engineered race "Homo superior". The Homo superior have enhanced themselves with DNA from a race of hostile extraterrestrials called Nephilim who are known for their superior military skills, to wipe out all the Homo sapiens and Homo technis "lesser" races from the galaxy. In order to save the "lower" races, Homo technis develops a genus of sapiens called "breeders", with an ability to bring multiple births to term quickly.

The Nephilim Homo superior manage to destroy all of Earth's "breeders", save one man and one woman. As a "breeder" himself, disgraced military man Derasi Vorde (Jay Laisne), has the duty of bringing the last female "breeder" from Earth to the safety of an off-world rebel base.

== Cast ==
- Neil Johnson as Opening Narrator
- Jay Laisne as Derasi Vorde
- Rochelle Vallese as Contessa
- Cynthia Ickes as Alicia
- Kari Nissena as Gorlock
- Blake Edgerton as Statis Konstrukt 1
- Marc Scott Zicree as Statis Konstrukt 2
- William David Tulin as Sorgon 387
- Peta Johnson as Sheetak Declan (The Blue Whale)
- Don Baldaramos as General Freitag
- Joseph Darden as Roj-Junior
- James Canino as The Destroyer
- Maria Olsen as Sarah 419
- Bruce Douglas as Nephilim Priest
- Todd Justin as Nephilim Berserker
- Jak Fearon as Nephilim Field Commander
- John Alton as Nephilim Infiltrator
- Andrew Mallon as Nephilim Warrior #1
- Emmett Callinan as Nephilim Warrior #2
- Andrew Buist as Nephilim Aqua Warrior
- Amanda Walion as Robot Girl
- Pedro Cement as Deseri Vorde (in flashback as child)

== Critical response ==
Quiet Earth praised the expectations created by release of the film trailer, writing they were "immediately blown away by what a SFX extravaganza it was shaping up to be," and that even if the CGI did not live up to expectations created by such as James Cameron's Avatar, the release of the film was anticipated.

DVD Talk made note the film suffered from low-quality CGI but, based upon its original film trailer, the concept appeared intriguing. They offered that the film itself came off as an effort that appears to use parts of Serenity, post-modern Battlestar Galactica, mixed with old-school 1950s B-movie sci-fi, overstated machismo male characters, and an inventive intergalactic tech-speak, to create a product that is "unintentionally hilarious cinematic cheese". In noted director Neil Johnson's love for "interstellar overdrives", they observed that he borrowed plot devices from such as Children of Men, The Hitchhiker's Guide to the Galaxy, and '50s B-movies, and how like Raul Gasteazoro did with 10,000 A.D.: The Legend of a Black Pearl and Cory McAbee with The American Astronaut, he created his own version of the future universe, and stuck to its constraints, even though his characters were caricatures, "no matter how irritating or aggravating." They concluded that the result was "far from space junky", but that the director's single-mindedness gave a result which ended up "looking a bit silly." They gave him "kudos for being so brave" and "a few demerits for being so bafflingly brazen."

Home Media Magazine makes note that the film does not result in the destruction of humanity, but that the resemblance of the various forms of humans to one another adds to confusion for the viewer. They praised Jay Laisne as Derasi Vorde, writing his "Han Solo impressions will be enjoyed by sci-fi fans disappointed by Harrison Ford's appointment with the natural aging process". They also approved of the film's focusing on the characters rather than the technology, offering that this created a science fiction story "that is above the norm." They found flaw in the film's concentration on "petty drama between the characters" when the far more crucial battles of earth-humanity vs Nephilim is played out off camera and in the background.

Virtual DVD Magazine offered that the film would be appreciated by lovers of B-movie science fiction, but that its low-quality CGI visuals would require getting used to. They noted as a flaw, the film concentrating on characters to the exclusion of the backstory, in that in omitting the battles between humanity and the Nephilim, the film did not give viewers as much as it could have.
