= Just a Little Harmless Sex =

1999 film by Rick Rosenthal

- Theatrical release poster
- Directed by: Rick Rosenthal
- Written by: Roger Mills; Marti Noxon
- Produced by: Deborah Capogrosso
- Starring: Alison Eastwood; Rachel Hunter; Lauren Hutton; Tito Larriva; Jessica Lundy; Robert Mailhouse; William Ragsdale; Jonathan Silverman; Kimberly Williams
- Cinematography: Bruce Surtees
- Edited by: Jim Stewart
- Distributed by: Phaedra Cinema; PM Entertainment (VHS); Artisan Entertainment (DVD)
- Release dates: October 1998 (Los Angeles International Film Festival); June 11, 1999 (United States)
- Running time: 95 minutes
- Country: United States
- Language: English

Just a Little Harmless Sex is a 1998 American romantic sex comedy film which revolves around a stranded motorist (and prostitute)'s offer to perform oral sex on a monogamous man who stops to help her. The unlikely good Samaritan must telephone his wife to bail him out in the middle of the night upon his arrest for the encounter. She throws him out of the house just a few days later and goes out with her friends to enjoy a sexy night on the town. The denouement takes place when all the parties meet at a local nightclub for explanations and apologies. The film was directed by Rick Rosenthal, written by Roger Mills and Marti Noxon, and stars Alison Eastwood and Jonathan Silverman.

The film received generally poor reviews from critics, with a Rotten Tomatoes rating of 20% derived from five professional reviews. Writing for The New York Times, Lawrence Van Gelder compared the film to a TV sitcom, and said the movie was "well cast, well acted and thoroughly inconsequential". Writing for Variety, Lael Loewenstein said "what saves [the film] from being utterly predictable is its zesty dialogue".
