= Marty Papazian =

American actor

- Born: April 18, 1976 (age 50); Los Angeles, California, U.S.
- Other name: Martin A. Papazian
- Occupation: Actor
- Years active: 1992–present
- Spouse: Marina Benedict (m. 2018)

Marty Papazian is an American television and film actor. He played CTU Interrogator Rick Burke in the television series 24 (2006–2007). Papazian made his directorial debut with the 2012 film Least Among Saints, in which he stars opposite Laura San Giacomo and Charles S. Dutton.

Papazian voiced the main character in 2006 game Black.

== Filmography ==
=== Film ===
Year	Title	Role	Notes
2001	All You Need	Eric Gerzeli	
2001	Determination of Death	Denny	
2001	Face Value	Dean	
2003	Power Play	Joel	
2005	The Island	Censor	
2005	Jarhead	Brian Dettman	
2007	Believers	Ray	
2007	Safe Harbour	Doctor	
2008	The Burning Plain	Young Man	
2009	American Cowslip	Jay	
2012	The Amazing Spider-Man	NYPD EMT	Uncredited
2012	Least Among Saints	Anthony	Also writer
2013	Rain from Stars	Burt	
2016	Losing in Love	Ronnie	Also writer and producer
2018	Spare Room	Medic	

=== Television ===
Year	Title	Role	Notes
1992	Drive Like Lightning	Doolie	Television film
2001	A Mother's Testimony		Television film
2003	Charmed	Assistant Director	Episode: "My Three Witches"
2003	Less than Perfect	Delivery Person	Episode: "Santa Claude"
2004	The Trail to Hope Rose	Durham	Television film
2004	JAG	Sgt. Brendan Walters	Episode: "This Just in from Baghdad"
2005	McBride: Murder Past Midnight	Vincent	Television film
2005	Thicker than Water	Stableboy	Television film
2005	NCIS	Sgt. Jake Roberts	Episode: "The Voyeur's Web"
2006	Without a Trace	Pete Natale	Episode: "Rage"
2006	Monk	Captain Savo	Episode: "Mr. Monk and the Astronaut"
2006	The Unit	Sgt. Johnson	Episode: "Security"
2006–2007	24	Rick Burke	3 episodes
2007	Pandemic	Mr. Smoke	Miniseries
2007	24: Day 6 Debrief	Rick Burke	5 episodes
2007	Dexter	Mack	Episode: "Waiting to Exhale"
2007	Supernatural	Richie	Episode: "Sin City"
2007	Bats: Human Harvest	Downey	Television film
2007	Company Man	Felix	Television film
2009	Lie to Me	Adam Duke	Episode: "Undercover"
2009	CSI: NY	Mr. Birnbaum	Episode: "Manhattanhenge"
2017	Rosewood	EMT	Episode: "Benzodiazepine & the Benjamins"
2020	L.A.'s Finest	Medic #1	Episode: "Bad Company"
