= A Year and Change =

2015 film

- Film poster
- Directed by: Stephen Suettinger
- Written by: Stephen Suettinger; Jim Beggarly
- Produced by: Stephen Suettinger; Emily Ting
- Edited by: Penny Lee
- Music by: Jeff Toyne
- Production companies: Pebble Hill Films; Unbound Feet Productions; Ramo Law PC
- Release date: November 24, 2015
- Country: United States
- Language: English

A Year and Change is an independent drama film directed by Stephen Suettinger. It was filmed in Maryland in December 2013.

== Synopsis ==
After drunkenly falling off the roof at a New Year’s house party, Owen decides that it’s time to make some wholesale changes in his life. Over the next year, he re-enters his estranged son’s life, reignites old friendships, quits drinking, and falls in love with Vera, a bank teller and fellow divorcee. All in an attempt to surround himself with a family, subconsciously replacing the one he’d lost prematurely. Owen, a vending machine proprietor, soon finds that sometimes in life you just need a little change.

== Cast ==
- Bryan Greenberg as Owen
- T.R. Knight as Kenny
- Claire van der Boom as Vera
- Marshall Allman as Victor
- Jamie Hector as Todd
- Kat Foster as Cindy
- Jamie Chung as Pam
- Natasha Rothwell as Angie
- Drew Shugart as Adam
- Dan Thiel as Peter
- Kate Sanford as Aunt Claire
- Woody Schultz as Martin
- Alison Whitney as Melissa
- Laurie Folkes as Meester Wheeler
- Cassidy Thornton as Kimmy
- Walker Babington as Antique Shop Owner
- Cruz Kim as Tim Kim

== Reception ==
A review published by Paste staff highlighted that the film is "overstuffed and convoluted." For The Hollywood Reporter, Frank Scheck wrote: "making excellent use of Maryland locations (...) is the sort of movie that will make you wonder how its characters are faring long after the credits roll."
