= Rick Rosenthal =

American director

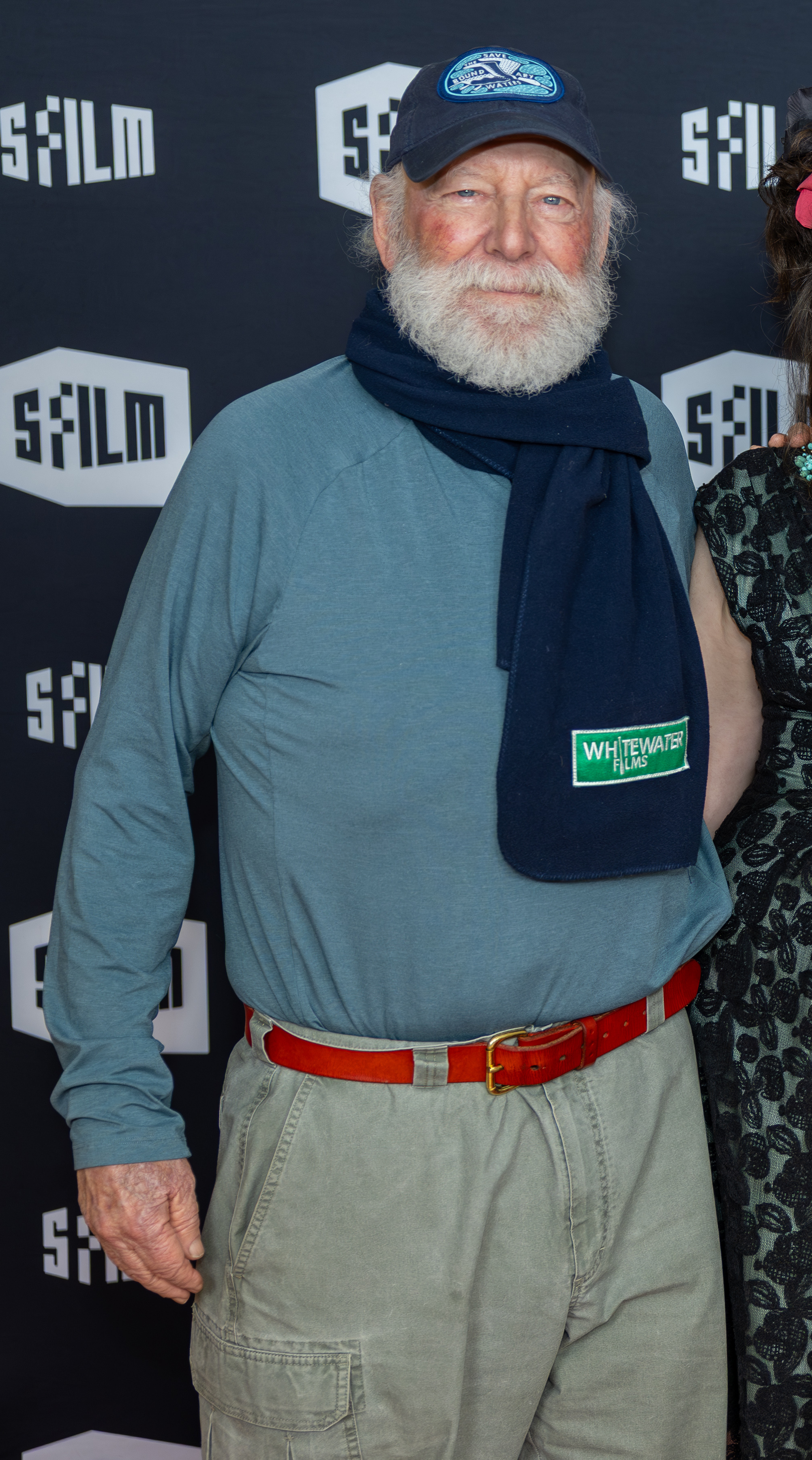
- Rosenthal at SFFILM in 2026
- Born: Richard L. Rosenthal Jr. June 15, 1949 (age 77); New York City, U.S.
- Education: AFI Conservatory
- Occupations: Film director; film instructor; film historian; television director; producer
- Years active: 1975–present
- Spouse: Nancy Stephens (m. 1981)
- Children: 3

Richard L. Rosenthal Jr. (born June 15, 1949) is an American film instructor and director, known for directing Halloween II, Bad Boys, and Halloween: Resurrection.

== Early life ==
Rosenthal was born in New York City, the son of Hinda (née Gould) and entrepreneur Richard L. Rosenthal Sr.

== Career ==
Rosenthal started his career by directing Halloween II and returned to the series 21 years later, helming Halloween: Resurrection. In between, he directed films such as American Dreamer (1984), Russkies (1987), Distant Thunder (1988), and Just a Little Harmless Sex (1998). He also directed dozens of episodic television shows and was co-executive producer of the landmark Warner Bros. TV series Life Goes On for ABC from 1989-1991, where he guest starred in two episodes as "Uncle Richard".

Rosenthal, along with his wife Nancy Stephens, executive produced the film Invisible Beauty about model and activist Bethann Hardison, which premiered at the 2023 Sundance Film Festival.

== Personal life ==
Rosenthal met his wife, actress Nancy Stephens, while filming Halloween II.

== Select filmography as a director ==
=== Film ===
- Halloween II (1981)
- Bad Boys (1983)
- American Dreamer (1984)
- Russkies (1987)
- Distant Thunder (1988)
- Just a Little Harmless Sex (1998)
- Halloween: Resurrection (2002)
- Nearing Grace (2005)
- Drones (2013)

=== Television ===
- Secrets of Midland Heights (1 episode, 1981)
- Darkroom (3 episodes, 1981-1982)
- Life Goes On (10 episodes, 1989-1991)
- Nasty Boys (1989, pilot)
- Yesterday Today (1992, unsold pilot)
- The Witches of Eastwick (1992, unsold pilot)
- Devlin (1992, television film; released theatrically in the Philippines as New York Mob War)
- The Birds II: Land's End (1994, television film), credited as Alan Smithee
- Early Edition (2 episodes, 1996–1997)
- Dellaventura (1 episode, 1997)
- The Practice (1 episode, 1997)
- Wasteland (1 episode, 1999)
- Law & Order: Special Victims Unit (2 episodes, 1999–2000)
- Strong Medicine (1 episode, 2000)
- Providence (6 episodes, 2000–2001)
- The District (6 episodes, 2001–2003)
- Buffy the Vampire Slayer (2 episodes, 2002)
- Crossing Jordan (1 episode, 2002)
- She Spies (1 episode, 2003)
- Smallville (7 episodes, 2003–2008)
- Tru Calling (2 episodes, 2004–2005)
- Point Pleasant (1 episode, 2005)
- Reunion (3 episodes, 2005–2006)
- Veronica Mars (1 episode, 2006)
- Flash Gordon (1 episode, 2007)
- The Dresden Files (1 episode, 2007)
- 90210 (1 episode, 2009)
- Being Erica (3 episodes, 2009–2010)
- Greek (1 episode, 2009)
- Mental (1 episode, 2009)
- Life on Mars (1 episode, 2009)
- Haven (1 episode, 2010)
- Drop Dead Diva (1 episode, 2010)
- Gigantic (2 episodes, 2010)
- Shattered (2 episodes, 2010)
- Beauty & the Beast (1 episode, 2013)
