= Bats: Human Harvest =

- Genre: Horror; Thriller
- Written by: Brett Merryman; Chris Denk
- Directed by: Jamie Dixon
- Starring: David Chokachi; Michael Jace; Pollyanna McIntosh; Marty Papazian; Melissa De Sousa; Tomas Arana
- Music by: Louis Castle; James Bairian
- Country of origin: United States
- Original language: English

Production
- Producers: Jeffery Beach; Phillip Roth
- Cinematography: Ivo Peitchev
- Editor: Matt Michael
- Running time: 84 minutes
- Production companies: Destination Films; Sci-Fi Pictures; BUFO; Silver Nitrate Pictures

Original release
- Network: Sci-Fi Channel
- Release: November 10, 2007

Related
- Bats

Bats: Human Harvest is a 2007 Sci-Fi Channel original movie, directed by Jamie Dixon, and starring David Chokachi, Tomas Arana, Bill Cusack and Melissa De Sousa. It is a sequel to the 1999 theatrical film Bats.

== Plot ==
A group of Delta Force soldiers, accompanied by Russian born CIA agent Katya Zemanova (Pollyanna McIntosh), are sent to the Belzan forest in Chechnya in search of a rogue American weapons researcher, Dr. Benton Walsh. As they search for Walsh's camp, they are attacked by genetically-altered carnivorous bats. The survivors attempt to reach helicopter extraction but encounter various challenges, including Chechen rebels.

Most of the force was killed during the mission along with other groups of rebels, and only four members of Delta force, including Captain Russo manage to survive. Russo, the leader, finally discovers Walsh, who has become "immune" to the bats by injecting special chemicals into him. Russo kills the doctor and get back to the rebel camp, using a high-power microphone to send out noises to lure the bats back to the camp, where he ignites the fuel tanks and blasts the camp, killing all of the bats except one that survives at the end of the film, flying off a farmer's wagon. Russo, Downey, and Katya escape.

== Cast ==
- David Chokachi as Captain Russo
- Michael Jace as Lieutenant Colonel Martinez
- Pollyanna McIntosh as Katya Simonova
- Marty Papazian as Downey
- Melissa De Sousa as Lieutenant O'Neal
- Tomas Arana as Dr. Benton Walsh
- Mike Straub as Candell
- Todd Jensen as Delta Force Colonel
- Ivo Simeonov as Major Sergei Kurkov
- Dimitar Karageorgiev as Russian Lieutenant
- Jamie Dixon as Hostage
- Bill Cusack as General Ramsey
- George Zlatarev as Grigori
- Vasil Draganov as Dmitri
- Vladimir Kolev as Colonel Vladimir Kurkov
- Bisser Marinov as Alu
- Hristo Petkov as Malik
- Hristo Mitzkov as Anatoli
- Velislav Pavlov as Chechen One
- Nickolai Lukanov as Russian Deputy
- Vlado Mihailov as Extraction Pilot
- Ivan Kotsev as Russian Pilot
- Filip Avramov as Russian General
- LaFern Cusack as The Secretary (uncredited)
- Lance Frank as Medic (uncredited)

== See also ==
- Vampire Bats
