= Lisa Ho =

Australian fashion designer

Lisa Ho (born 1960) is an Australian fashion designer.

== Early life ==
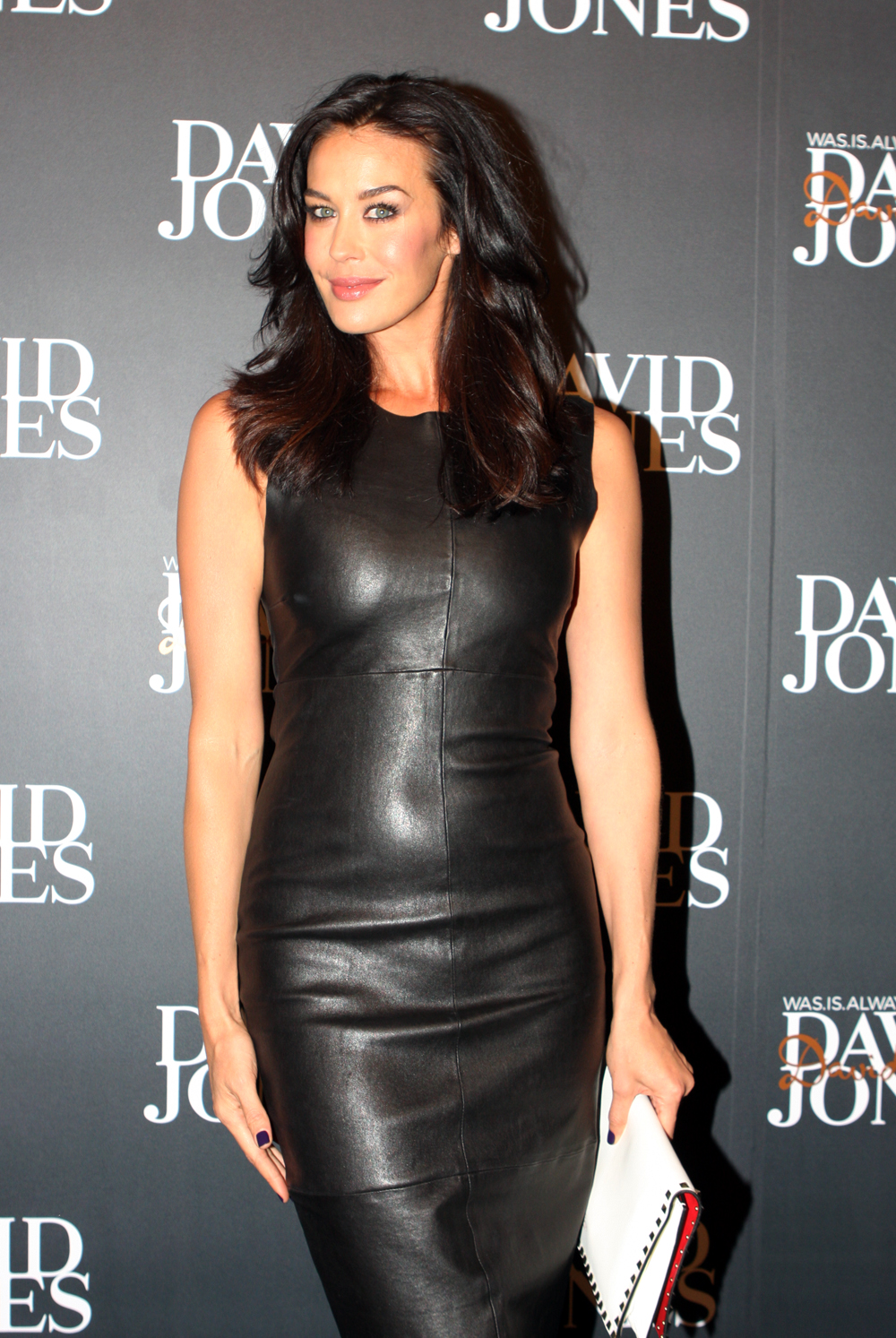
Megan Gale presents a leather dress by Lisa Ho

Ho was born in Albury, New South Wales. She is of Chinese and English descent. She began sewing at age four inspired by her grandmother of African descent, a tailor, whom Ho says she 'probably drove mad'. Ho made patterns out of newspaper and by age 10 had a sewing machine at the end of the kitchen table 'that nobody was allowed to move,' which she used every day to make things for herself and four sisters.

Ho attended Pennant Hills High School. She later trained in fashion design at East Sydney Technical College, graduating in 1981 and spent a year working for three other companies, which she 'hated', before going out on her own.

== Career ==
Like many of Australia's fashion designers, fresh out of college in 1982, Ho started her career at the Paddington markets for only six weeks with her designs that quickly brought her retail and media attention and began the Lisa Ho brand.

The Lisa Ho brand was one of the most recognised brands in Australia and had a celebrity following with the signature pieces being worn by Delta Goodrem, Bec Cartwright, Sarah Wynter, Elle Macpherson, Sarah Michelle Gellar, Olivia Newton-John and Jennifer Lopez.

Her international reputation was first recognised during the 2000 Summer Olympics opening ceremony, which featured a special segment she designed celebrating her role in Australian fashion. She was also asked to design the gown worn by Newton-John for her performance to welcome the Olympic athletes.

Ho's businesses employed 80 staff (excluding out-workers) across 12 signature stores and head office. Her label was also stocked in David Jones stores and available worldwide via her online store.

== Business closure ==
On 8 May 2013, Lisa Ho Designs and Lisa Ho Retail were placed into administration. This came just months after the company announced plans to list on the Australian Securities Exchange. On 18 June 2013, the administrators announced the closure of Lisa Ho Group, including all Lisa Ho stores across Sydney, Melbourne and Brisbane. The company reportedly was $12 million in debt and failed to attract buyers after going into administration.

== Personal life ==
Ho is engaged to Nick Jacenko.

Ho was one of the victims of serial conman Hamish McLaren (ultimately losing her companies and $350,000 personally) who she met in 2011. She was interviewed during the award-winning 2019 podcast based on his crimes, Who the Hell Is Hamish?.
