= Battlecreek =

- Theatrical release poster
- Directed by: Alison Eastwood
- Written by: Anthea Anka
- Produced by: Alison Eastwood; Tempe Hale; Ricky Hill; Stephen Hintz; Constance L. Hoy; Michael G. Wallace
- Starring: Bill Skarsgård; Paula Malcomson; Claire van der Boom; Toby Hemingway
- Cinematography: Dane Lawing
- Edited by: Gary Roach
- Production companies: Maindiner Music & Film; Red River Studios
- Distributed by: Hannover House
- Release date: November 3, 2017 (United States)
- Running time: 97 minutes
- Country: United States
- Language: English

Battlecreek is a 2017 American romantic drama film starring Bill Skarsgård, Paula Malcomson and Claire van der Boom, and directed by Alison Eastwood. It is about a young man with a rare skin disease that forces him to avoid sunlight. He meets a young woman after her car breaks down, which leads him to change his life.

== Plot ==
Henry Pearl (Bill Skarsgård) is a young man who suffers from a rare skin disease that results in severe burns from sun exposure. He has scarring on his body from a childhood accident that occurred when he wandered outside, unsupervised. His father was supposedly drunk in the house at the time, and abandoned the family not long after.

As a result of his condition, Henry is awake mostly at night and lives at home with his over-protective mother, Tallulah (Paula Malcomson), in the southern town of Battlecreek. He spends his time frequenting a local diner, staffed by kind waitress Melinda (Dana Powell), working the night shift at a gas station with family friend Arthur (Delroy Lindo), and painting murals on the walls of his room.

A mysterious woman named Alison (Claire van der Boom) is stranded when her car breaks down. Henry meets her when she's hired as a waitress to pay for the repairs. A romance soon develops, much to his mother's chagrin. Despite their differences, they effect positive changes in one another; Henry grows more confident, while Alison begins to emotionally open up.

When Cy (Toby Hemingway), Allison's abusive, drug dealing ex-boyfriend, tracks her down, her first instinct is to run and leave Henry behind. He then learns from Arthur that his father left the family before his accident. He presses Tallulah for more information and she confesses that she was the one who was drunk and failed to keep him indoors on that fateful day. Heart-broken and feeling betrayed, Henry moves out of the house.

Alison, meanwhile, is kidnapped by Cy. He threatens to torture her, but she manages to break free of her restraints and kill him. She wraps up his corpse and sinks it into a nearby bayou.

Allison and Henry reunite. He tells her that he doesn't want to hide from life anymore. They leave Battlecreek together in her repaired car.

== Cast ==
- Bill Skarsgård as Henry
- Paula Malcomson as Tallulah
- Claire van der Boom as Alison
- Delroy Lindo as Arthur
- Toby Hemingway as Cy
- Dana Powell as Melinda

== Reception ==
The film has not been widely reviewed. Joe Leydon of Variety was positively affected by the film, writing "One of the more impressive qualities of “Battlecreek,” a slow-burn drama set in a sultry Mississippi town, is the way it upends audience expectations by taking a surprise detour or two while covering familiar ground." According to Gary Goldstein of the Los Angeles Times, "Anthea Anka's earnest script manages to paint Henry as a kindly, poetic fellow, but with enough quiet self-possession to avoid sinking him in pathos. It's a tricky balancing act, beautifully matched by Skarsgård's depiction." Justin Lowe of The Hollywood Reporter was unimpressed, writing "Anka’s first produced script only fitfully resists the temptation to rely on cliches rather than creativity to tell Henry’s belated coming-of-age story. Eastwood seems disinclined to salvage the film from sentimental wallowing, either, indulging Anka’s conventionally conceived predilection for redeeming her physically and morally flawed characters, along with a set of predictable plot points that converge only with deliberate force."
