= Least Among Saints =

2012 American drama film

- Theatrical release poster
- Directed by: Martin Papazian
- Written by: Martin Papazian
- Produced by: Kurt David Anderson; James G. Hirsch; Robert Papazian; Mary Vernieu
- Starring: Martin Papazian; Tristan Lake Leabu; Laura San Giacomo; Charles S. Dutton
- Cinematography: Guy Skinner
- Edited by: Robert Florio
- Music by: Gary Lionelli
- Production company: LA Saints Production
- Distributed by: Brainstorm Media; Vertical Entertainment (U.S. DVD)
- Release dates: 12 October 2012; 2 July 2013 (DVD)
- Running time: 101 minutes
- Country: United States
- Language: English
- Budget: $1.5 million
- Box office: $28,026

Least Among Saints is a 2012 American drama film written by, directed by, and starring Martin Papazian with Tristan Lake Leabu, Laura San Giacomo and Charles S. Dutton.

== Plot ==
Anthony (Papazian) is a former Marine who has just returned to his home in Arizona after a tour abroad. He suffers from posttraumatic stress disorder, frequently waking up in the middle of the night with nightmares. His ex-wife Jenny (Anderson) has filed a restraining order against him, and he has had brush-ins with the law. He befriends his neighbor Cheryl (Cook), whom he defends from her boyfriend. Cheryl's son Wade (Leabu) looks up to Anthony, and the two become friends.

One night, when Anthony is about to attempt suicide, Wade comes in asking him to help his mother, who has overdosed on heroin. Anthony takes them to University Medical Center to try to help her, but she dies. A social services worker named Jolene (San Giacomo) agrees to let Anthony take care of Wade while they find him a foster family. Anthony encourages Wade to beat up a bully and restrains a teacher who tries to intervene, which brings in police officer George (Dutton) to find them after they go on a mission to find Wade's real father.

Wade accidentally kills Anthony's dog and Anthony is arrested on numerous charges. Wade goes into foster care. Anthony agrees to Jolene's demands to take care of himself and she finally allows him to spend time with Wade.

== Cast ==
- Martin Papazian as Anthony
- Tristan Lake Leabu as Wade
- Laura San Giacomo as Jolene
- Azura Skye as May
- Audrey Marie Anderson as Jenny
- A.J. Cook as Cheryl
- Charles S. Dutton as George
- Taylor Kinney as Jessie
- Lombardo Boyar as Armando
- Kari Nissena as Beth
- Max Charles as Dylan
- Ronnie Gene Blevins as Ronnie

== Critical response ==
On Rotten Tomatoes the film has a score of 36% based on 11 reviews. On Metacritic the film has a score of 32 out of 100 based on reviews from 7 critics, indicating "generally unfavorable" reviews, but an 87% rating from audiences.

Anthony Barker of Daily Variety: "Papazian registers best as an actor, realistically inhabiting his post-traumatic-stress-tormented ex-Marine protag, Anthony... . Acting is solid if unremarkable all around, with San Giacomo the sharpest of the supporting bunch."

Simon Abrams of The Village Voice: "There's no amount of emotional distress that macho brooding can't fix in Least Among Saints, a monotonous drama centered on a PTSD-afflicted Gulf War II soldier's search for canned redemption. The emotional stakes of writer/director/star Martin Papazian's feature directorial debut are almost exclusively defined by clichés"

Chuck Bowen of Slant Magazine: "Tonally, Least Among Saints is reminiscent of the low-rent action films released under the WWE banner... The film is simply, particularly for its sensitive subject matter, inexcusably absurd... but as a story meant to take place on some rational version of planet Earth, it's utterly hopeless."
