= Black and White (1999 TV film) =

- Genre: Thriller
- Written by: Yuri Zeltser; Leon Zeltser
- Directed by: Yuri Zeltser
- Starring: Gina Gershon; Rory Cochrane
- Music by: Amotz Plessner
- Country of origin: United States
- Original language: English

Production
- Producers: Ram Bergman; Dana Lustig; Natan Zahavi
- Cinematography: Phil Parmet
- Editor: Glenn Garland
- Running time: 97 minutes
- Production companies: The Kushner-Locke Company; Tapestry Films; Bergman Lustig Productions

Original release
- Network: HBO
- Release: February 12, 1999

Black and White is a 1999 American thriller television film directed by Yuri Zeltser and starring Gina Gershon and Rory Cochrane. The film premiered on HBO on February 12, 1999.

== Plot ==
A rookie Los Angeles police officer, Chris O'Brien, is partnered with a hard-edged officer, Nora Hugosian. They develop a relationship at the same time that Hugosian is suspected of being a serial killer that is roaming the city.

== Cast ==
- Gina Gershon as Nora "Hugs" Hugosian
- Rory Cochrane as Chris O'Brien
- Ron Silver as Simon Herzel
- Alison Eastwood as Lynn Dombrowsky
- Ross Partridge as Michael Clemence / Armin Hugosian
- James Handy as Sergeant Wright
- Kamala Lopez as Carmela

== Reception ==
On the review aggregator website Rotten Tomatoes, 20% of 10 critics' reviews are positive.
