= Alison Eastwood =

American film director and actress

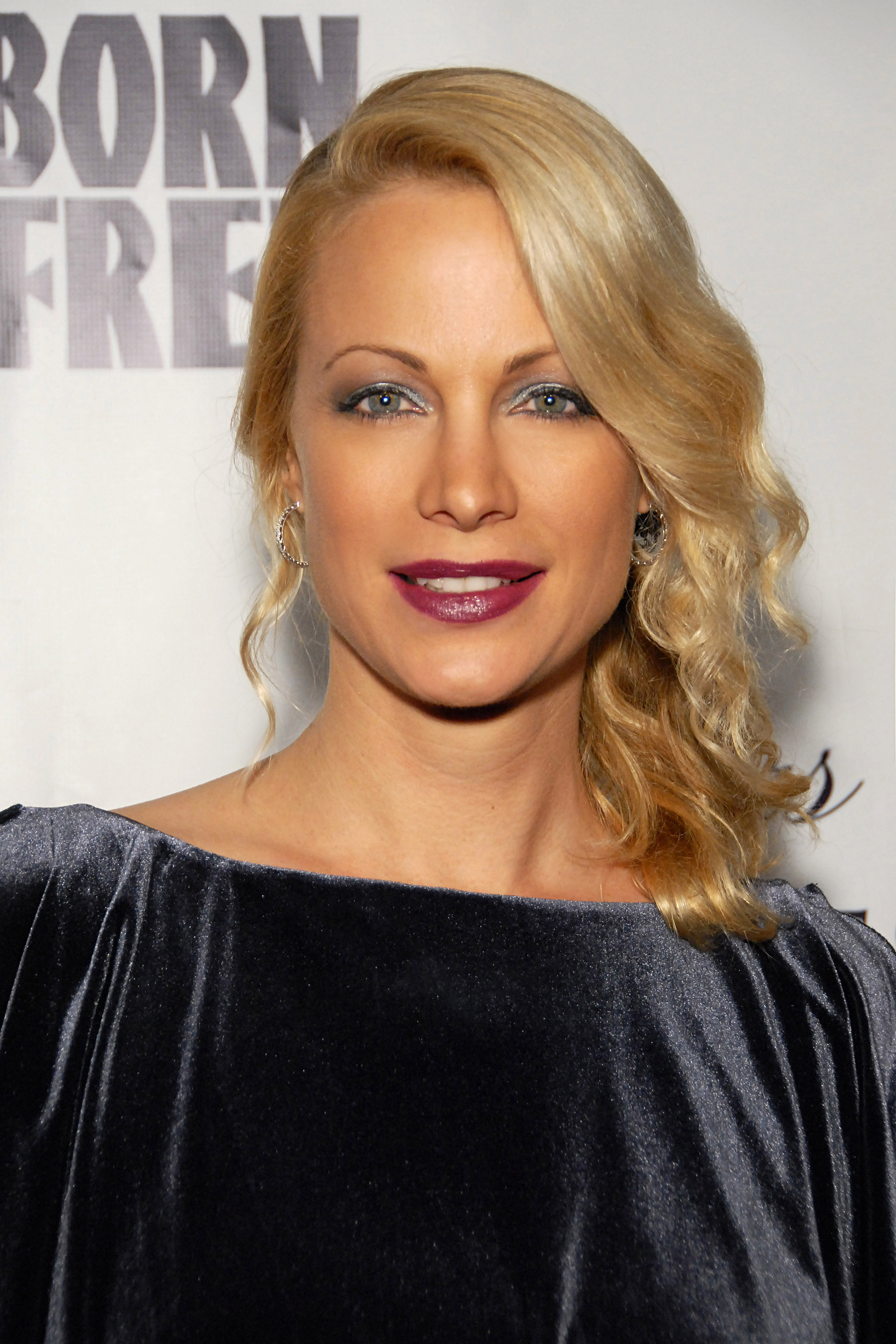
- Eastwood in 2012
- Born: May 22, 1972 (age 54); Santa Monica, California, U.S.
- Occupation: Actress
- Years active: 1980–present
- Spouses: Kirk Fox (m. 1999; div. 2000) Stacy Poitras (m. 2013)
- Father: Clint Eastwood
- Relatives: Kyle Eastwood (brother); Scott Eastwood (half-brother); Francesca Eastwood (half-sister)

Alison Eastwood (born May 22, 1972) is an American film director and actress.

== Early life ==
Eastwood was born in 1972 in Santa Monica, California, to fitness instructor Margaret Neville Johnson (1931–2026) and actor Clint Eastwood. She has a brother, Kyle, and six known paternal half-siblings, including Scott and Francesca.

She attended Santa Catalina School in Monterey, California, and Stevenson School in Pebble Beach. She attended UC Santa Barbara, but did not graduate.

== Career ==
Eastwood landed some professional acting roles during her childhood and preadolescent years. Her acting in the 1984 thriller Tightrope earned her a Young Artist Award nomination. She has also worked as a runway and magazine model in Paris, posing for several European fashion magazines and the American edition of Vogue. She posed nude in the February 2003 issue of Playboy.

Since then, Eastwood has again appeared onscreen. Film credits include Just a Little Harmless Sex (1998), Black and White (1999), Friends & Lovers (1999), If You Only Knew (2000), Power Play (2002), Poolhall Junkies (2003), I'll Be Seeing You (2004), One Long Night (2007), Once Fallen (2010), and The Mule (2018).

Eastwood made her directorial debut with Rails & Ties (2007), starring Kevin Bacon and Marcia Gay Harden.

She has her own clothing line, called the Eastwood Ranch Apparel. She is the founder of the Eastwood Ranch Foundation, a non-profit animal welfare organization.

On the small screen, she appeared in the Nat Geo Wild TV program Animal Intervention. She has also been featured on the reality TV series Chainsaw Gang as one of the sculptor's girlfriends. The sculptor is Stacy Poitras, whom she married on March 15, 2013.

Eastwood's cover of "Come Rain or Come Shine", which she is shown performing part of in Midnight in the Garden of Good and Evil, is included on the movie's soundtrack.

She directed the romantic drama film Battlecreek (2017), starring Bill Skarsgård, Paula Malcomson, and Claire van der Boom.

== Filmography ==
Year	Title	Role	Notes
1980	Bronco Billy	Child at orphanage	Uncredited
1980	Any Which Way You Can	Kid	Uncredited
1984	Tightrope	Amanda Block	
1997	Absolute Power	Art Student	Uncredited
1997	Midnight in the Garden of Good and Evil	Mandy Nicholls	
1998	Just a Little Harmless Sex	Laura	
1998	Suicide, the Comedy	Amanda	
1999	Breakfast of Champions	Maria Maritimo	
1999	Friends & Lovers	Lisa	
1999	Black and White	Lynn Dombrowsky	TV film
2000	The Spring	Sophie Weston	TV film
2000	If You Only Knew	Samantha	
2002	Poolhall Junkies	Tara	
2002	The Bend	Sue Morris	Short subject
2002	Power Play	Gabriella St. John	
2004	I'll Be Seeing You	Patricia Collins	TV film
2004	They Are Among Us	Finley	TV film
2005	Flatbush	Shellman	Short subject
2005	The Lost Angel	Detective Billie Palmer	
2005	Don't Tell	Raphael	
2006	Lesser Evil	Karen Max	TV film
2006	How to Go Out on a Date in Queens	Karen	
2006	Waitin' to Live	Harriett Williams	
2007	Rails & Ties	—N/a	Director only
2007	One Long Night	Wendy	
2010	Once Fallen	Kat	
2011	Henry	Laura	Short subject
2012	Animal Intervention	Herself	Docuseries
2013	Shadow People	Sophie Lacombe	
2014	Finding Harmony	Sam Colter	
2014	C.R.U.	Allison Doyle-Ewansiha	
2015	Unity	Narrator	Documentary
2017	Battlecreek	—N/a	Director only
2018	The Mule	Iris	

== Eastwood Ranch Foundation ==
In Agoura Hills, California, Alison Eastwood launched the Eastwood Ranch Foundation Animal Welfare and Rescue non-profit organization in 2012.

In 2024, the Foundation opened a rescue center. With modern kennel spaces and dedicated veterinary care, the non-profit increased its capacity to rescue and rehome animals from high-kill shelters while promoting community involvement in animal welfare.

The 3rd annual Chevy Metal benefit concert, featuring guests that included Dave Grohl and Gene Simmons, raised $50,000 for the Eastwood Ranch Foundation in August, 2025. Proceeds were used to support rescue, medical care, and adoption efforts for animals in Southern California.

The Eastwood Ranch Foundation has organized adoption fairs, such as the Valentine’s Pet Adoption Event in February 2026, which found homes for over 30 rescue cats and dogs.

In April 2026, the Eastwood Ranch Foundation hosted a legislative press event for California's AB 2010 (SNIP Act) at their Agoura Hills adoption center, focused on systemic solutions to animal overpopulation. The bill expands low-cost spay/neuter access, aiming to reduce high-risk shelter intakes and euthanasia rates in California.
