= Hamish & Andy (podcast) =

Australian 2018 comedy podcast by Hamish Blake & Andy Lee

- Genre: Comedy
- Language: English

Cast and voices
- Hosted by: Hamish Blake; Andy Lee; Jack Post

Music
- Opening theme: "Arcade Hero" by Beds and Beats

Production
- Direction: Sarah Grynberg; Mike Liberale; Sam Cavanagh
- Length: 45 minutes

Publication
- No. of seasons: 9
- No. of episodes: 320+
- Original release: 1 March 2018
- Provider: Listnr
- Updates: Thursdays

Related
- Preceded by: Hamish & Andy (radio show)
- Website: hamishandandy.com/podcasts/hamish-andy/

Hamish & Andy is a weekly podcast hosted by Australian comedy duo Hamish & Andy, with Jack Post joining Hamish Blake and Andy Lee as a co-host. The first episode was released on 1 March 2018 after the duo's retirement from live radio broadcasting in 2017. In a format similar to that of their previous radio shows of the same name, each episode runs for about 45 minutes with four to five segments. As of October 2023, the podcast is into its sixth season, with 40 episodes published annually.

The show has consistently rated as one of Australia's most downloaded programmes, and it was ranked the number-one comedy podcast in the country for five years straight as of the end of 2022. Hamish & Andy averages about one million monthly listeners as of July 2023.

== Background ==
In 2016, the duo announced that 2017 would be their final year on radio. Their final radio show was broadcast live from Margaret Court Arena on 1 December 2017 for their Cool Boys and the Frontman Private Jet Tour. Their final radio episodes from 2017 received an estimated 30 million podcast downloads. In 2018, Hamish & Andy announced they would be returning with a weekly podcast on 1 March.

== Release and ratings ==
Annually, 40 episodes are released every Thursday. Typically from December to late February (or "March Eve"), the podcast goes on hiatus, with the duo jokingly referring to it as a "government-mandated break".

Episodes are released on major podcast platforms as well as Southern Cross Austereo's online platform LiSTNR. In 2022, Hamish & Andy announced a partnership with Apple Podcasts, granting access to a complete archive of all the duo's radio shows since 2006 via a monthly subscription.

Hamish & Andy consistently rates as one of Australia's most-downloaded podcasts, and it is often ranked number one on the Triton Digital Podcast Ranker. In 2021 alone, the show had 18.4 million Australian downloads. It was the second-most-popular show in Australia in 2022, averaging 856,311 monthly listeners. In 2023, the show's national audience was reported to be about one million.

=== Season overview ===
List of seasons, episodes and airing dates of the Hamish & Andy podcast
Season	No. of episodes	List of episodes	First aired	Last aired
1	40	1–40	1 March 2018	29 November 2018
2	40	41–80	28 February 2019	28 November 2019
3	40	81–120	5 March 2020	3 December 2020
4	40	121–160	4 March 2021	2 December 2021
5	40	161–200	3 March 2022	1 December 2022
6	40	201–240	1 March 2023	30 November 2023
7	40	241–280	29 February 2024	28 November 2024
8	40	281–320	6 March 2025	4 December 2025
9	40	321–360	5 March 2026	TBA

== Notable activities ==
In October 2019, Hamish & Andy organised Chicken Fest, an international invitation to listeners to dress up in black tie garb and visit their favourite local chicken shop. The event, held on 21 October, culminated in thousands of listeners turning up to restaurants around Australia.

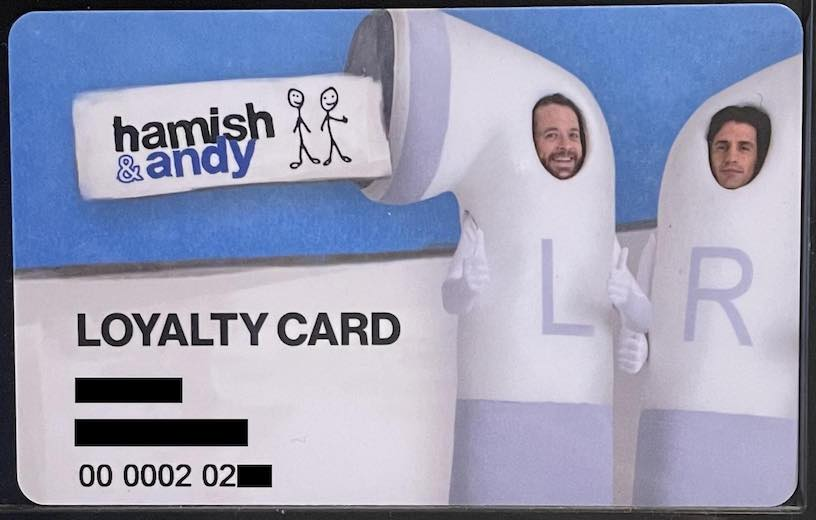
The front of a Hamish & Andy Loyalty Card with cardholder name and number redacted

In August 2020, the duo released the Hamish & Andy Loyalty Card, with the promise of being accepted at every store worldwide and giving 10% off the cardholder's purchase, with 5% of that cut immediately going back to the store, resulting in a net 5% discount. 30,000 cards were produced and sent to listeners who signed up at their website.

In October 2020, Hamish & Andy released a limited-edition illustrated coffee table book featuring over 100 "power moves" from the eponymous segment where listeners submit activities to assert dominance over each other. A total of 30,000 copies were produced in its first run. A second edition of the book was released in October 2021.

On 1 December 2022, as part of the season five finale, the duo, along with 61 listeners, gathered in a Rex Boeing 737 at Melbourne Airport for an "Emergency Slide Party", which involved everyone casually descending down the plane's evacuation slide. The event had originally been planned in 2020, but it was delayed numerous times due to the COVID-19 pandemic.

Hamish and Andy hosted a conference called ConCon at Golden Pines Resort, Gold Coast in November 2024, where the aim was to cover information relevant to every single participant's profession. 300 delegates attended across two days of presentations.

== Remembering Project (2020–present) ==
In October 2020, a spin-off podcast was launched titled Hamish & Andy's Remembering Project. Each episode, the duo are given a random date by Radio Mike to discuss all their previous radio shows that were conducted on that day. Either Blake or Lee picks a segment from a chosen year, and, if they conclude on a good one to talk about, they play it in full.

As of December 2022, 64 episodes of the Remembering Project have been published. Episodes from seasons 3 and 4 were originally exclusive to the LiSTNR app, but have since been added to other major podcast platforms. As of season 5, episodes debut on the LiSTNR app before being added elsewhere a week later.

The first episode of season 5 was a "special edition" featuring audio from Cruise Control, a radio show hosted by Hamish Blake and Andy Lee, along with Ryan Shelton and Wippa on the community radio station SYN. According to the duo, this was the first time they hosted a radio show.

=== Season overview ===
List of seasons, episodes and airing dates of the Remembering Project podcast
Season	No. of episodes	List of episodes	First aired	Last aired
1	20	1–20	12 October 2020	15 December 2020
2	20	21–40	12 April 2021	23 August 2021
3	12	41–52	28 April 2022	2 June 2022
4	12	53–64	8 September 2022	13 October 2022
5	12	65–76	30 November 2023	15 February 2024
6	12	77–88	28 November 2024	13 February 2025
