= Fred Basset (greyhound) =

Australian racing greyhound

Fred Bassett
- Breed: Greyhound
- Sire: Awesome Assassin
- Dam: Taylah Ruth
- Sex: Dog
- Whelped: October 4, 2004 (age 22)
- Country: Australia
- Color: Black
- Owner: Hamish & Andy

Fred Basset (born 4 October 2004 as Hoppa) is a greyhound dog that was owned and raced by Australian comedy duo Hamish & Andy. The dog's name is taken from the comic strip character Fred Basset, whose strip featured regularly on the Hamish & Andy radio show for a period of time. Since retiring from racing, Fred Basset has become an ambassador for greyhound adoption.

== History ==
=== The search for a greyhound ===
Andy Lee was nominated for the 2006 Cleo Bachelor of the Year competition. Hamish Blake took $860 (initially intended for a holiday for himself and his girlfriend) and won over $12000 for betting on Andy to win.

Listeners' suggestions led to the duo continuing gambling. The pair found "Ange the Dog Whisperer", a greyhound trainer who provided a greyhound named Hoppa sired by Awesome Assassin. On 26 August 2006, this greyhound was named Fred Basset after receiving 77% of listeners' votes. In September 2006, Hamish and Andy purchased the greyhound for $9,000.

=== The People's Greyhound ===
Fred's journey was a regular feature on Hamish and Andy's Melbourne-based afternoon drivetime radio show since Andy won Bachelor of the Year. Through every step of the journey, the duo pushed the idea that Fred is "The People's Greyhound", purportedly since without the continued support of the listeners, Andy would never have won.

Fans of the show flocked to Fred Basset's first-ever race in Melbourne on 12 October 2006. To the dismay of the duo and his fans, he placed last in Race 4 at Sandown Raceway (which was named The Hamish and Andy Stakes), but fans remained supportive. Fred then went on to win the Perth Greyhound Race Day with a fairly convincing lead.

=== Celebrity endorsement ===
Hamish and Andy competed to find a celebrity who could relate to dogs and who would endorse Fred Basset. Hamish chose to pursue Paris Hilton, since she owns a 'teacup' chihuahua, while Andy chose John Travolta. After fruitless phone calls to American Scientology churches, followed up with a call to Qantas, Andy managed to find a representative from Football Federation Australia promising to find Travolta's details. After a few more days of dead ends, Hamish then received Kiefer Sutherland's mobile phone number but was unable to obtain his endorsement; a day later, Blake claims Sutherland replied "please delete my number". Currently, Mike Whitney officially endorses Fred.

== Track record ==
After his first loss, Fred won at Albion Park in Brisbane. Later on at Angle Park Raceway in Adelaide, Fred backed up his first win with another victory, beating Nitrix in a close finish.

Race 4 on 11 November 2006 at Cannington Raceway in Perth drew large crowds, however even with the support of Mike Whitney and hundreds of Fred Basset fans, he could not achieve a podium place and finished fourth. Fred's celebrity status meant that he attracted media attention even when he failed to win.

In the 2007 Good Friday Appeal race, Fred won against two other greyhounds. Hamish and Andy donated half of his winnings to the 2007 Good Friday Appeal.

In June 2007 Fred had a bad fall in a race and was forced out of racing until he recovered.

Fred Basset last raced on 12 March 2008. He started in 57 races, for 8 first placings, 11 seconds and 13 thirds. His total prizemoney was $19,720.

Fred Basset now makes promotional and celebrity appearances at various events. He is also an ambassador for the Greyhound Adoption Program.

== Fred the psychic ==
Fred Bassett enjoys chicken McNuggets, and he is referred to as "the McNugget-loving champion". Hamish and Andy tried to use Fred's taste for McNuggets to predict the future. Before the two football grand finals of 2006 (NRL and AFL) were played, the boys performed two experiments. On one paper plate they wrote Broncos and on another they wrote Storm (these being the two teams who played in the NRL grand final) and placed one McNugget on each. Fred chose the Broncos McNugget, and after that the Broncos went on to win the match. The boys then did the same thing for the AFL, putting a nugget on one plate that read Swans, and another that read Eagles with Fred successfully choosing the winning team, the Eagles, once more.

Since these two key predictions, Fred also has successfully forecast that Mutto would be voted off Australian Idol, a one-in-nine chance.

After Fred's disappointing performance in his first race, it was decided (by Fred himself in a final McNugget choice) that he would choose to race and give up the McNuggets rather than continue as a "psychic lazy dog".

== Results ==
Colour	Result
Blue	1st
Green	Place

Place	Box	Weight	Distance	Track	Race	Date	Time	Margin
3	6	32.8	525	MEA	R3	2 August 2006	30.77625	3.75
S	-	-	520	DTO	R22	7 September 2006	-	-
1	1	33	450	BAL	R1	20 September 2006	25.56	10
1	2	32.8	450	BAL	R3	27 September 2006	25.4	6.5
8	1	32.8	515	SAN	R4	12 October 2006	31.08625	13.75
1	6	33.1	520	BGC	R6	19 October 2006	30.47	3
1	2	32.6	515	APK	R6	26 October 2006	29.85	0.5
4	6	32.7	530	CAN	R4	11 November 2006	31.396	2
1	8	32.6	457	GEL	R6	20 November 2006	25.75	6
3	5	32.8	525	MEA	R4	25 November 2006	30.611	7
3	5	32.6	515	SAN	R9	30 November 2006	30.4765	5.5
3	3	32.8	457	GEL	R6	8 December 2006	25.896	2
3	2	33	450	BAL	R11	13 December 2006	25.69405	4.35
6	5	33	525	MEA	R7	23 December 2006	31.571	17
R	-	-	525	MEA	R1	30 December 2006	-	-
4	5	33	450	BAL	R6	3 January 2007	26.00675	7.25
S	-	-	525	MEA	R2	6 January 2007	-	-
3	2	33	457	GEL	R4	2 March 2007	26.10625	3.75
3	5	33.6	457	GEL	R5	9 March 2007	26.21175	2.25
3	7	33.4	525	MEA	R2	17 March 2007	30.6395	6.5
3	4	33.2	515	SAN	R5	22 March 2007	30.21525	6.75
5	5	33.2	515	SAN	R10	29 March 2007	30.67076	6.52
7	7	33.4	525	MEA	R10	14 April 2007	30.95475	13.25
2	6	33.4	450	WBL	R1	25 April 2007	25.58025	1.75
1	6	33.4	450	WBL	R9	2 May 2007	25.48	0.5
4	5	33.2	525	MEA	R8	9 May 2007	30.84075	5.25
4	5	33.4	457	GEL	R5	18 May 2007	26.0335	4.5
1	1	33.4	457	GEL	R6	25 May 2007	25.82	0.25
2	1	33.4	515	SAN	R6	30 May 2007	30.1445	1.5
F	6	32.8	515	SAN	R3	7 June 2007	-	-
2	7	32.8	525	MEA	R10	16 June 2007	30.632	4
7	5	33.6	525	MEA	R6	20 June 2007	31.11275	19.25
6	6	33	480	HOR	R5	26 June 2007	28.39	10
S	-	-	525	MEA	R3	30 June 2007	-	-
R	-	-	450	WBL	R8	11 July 2007	-	-
2	3	33.4	515	SAN	R3	12 July 2007	30.3115	0.5
3	3	33.2	515	SAN	R7	19 July 2007	30.52325	2.75
2	4	32.8	515	SAN	R9	26 July 2007	30.38725	0.75
2	2	32.8	515	SAN	R9	2 August 2007	30.0263	0.1
5	2	33	515	SAN	R3	9 August 2007	30.83505	11.35
5	6	33.2	525	MEA	R1	18 August 2007	30.83825	7.75
1	1	33.2	457	GEL	R6	24 August 2007	25.65	0.75
7	4	33.4	515	SAN	R9	30 August 2007	30.758	16
7	5	33.4	515	SAN	R8	5 September 2007	30.9375	12.5
2	4	33.4	480	HOR	R6	11 September 2007	27.54575	0.25
2	1	33.4	525	MEA	R4	15 September 2007	30.2305	3.5
2	2	33.4	480	HOR	R8	18 September 2007	27.413	1
4	1	33.4	457	GEL	R8	28 September 2007	26.2635	4.5
4	7	33.4	525	MEA	R9	6 October 2007	30.4665	5.5
5	6	33.4	525	MEA	R8	10 October 2007	31.14475	13.25
4	3	33.6	480	HOR	R7	16 October 2007	28.23525	6.75
3	4	34	480	HOR	R6	30 October 2007	27.85375	6.25
4	6	34	457	GEL	R6	2 November 2007	25.95475	3.25
S	-	-	515	SAN	R4	6 November 2007	-	-
3	8	34.5	457	GEL	R6	23 November 2007	25.87925	4.75
2	1	34.4	450	BAL	R7	28 November 2007	25.569	3
5	4	34.2	450	WBL	R8	5 December 2007	26.08125	8.75
3	2	33.8	440	SLE	R7	9 December 2007	25.59425	9.75
8	7	34.1	515	SAN	R3	20 December 2007	31.31975	18.25
4	2	34.3	457	GEL	R6	28 December 2007	25.85705	5.35
4	1	34.4	450	BAL	R3	2 January 2008	25.943	1
2	3	34.4	332	WBL	R9	5 March 2008	19.4975	2.5
7	1	34.4	332	WBL	R9	12 March 2008	19.733	11

== Pedigree ==
New Tears
Light of Fire
Centrefire
Awesome Assassin
Acacia Ablaze
Tranquil Flame
Placid Dove
Fred Bassett
Malawi's Prince
Placard
Gem's Delight
Taylah Ruth
Head Honcho
Wine Glass
Hello Pop
