= Alex Graham (cartoonist) =

Scottish cartoonist (1918–1991)

Alexander Steel Graham (2 March 1917 – 3 December 1991) was a Scottish cartoonist who created the comic strip Fred Basset.

== Biography ==
Alexander Steel Graham was born in Partick, Glasgow, and educated at Dumfries Academy. He studied under William Hutchison at the Glasgow School of Art. During the war he served in the Argyll and Sutherland Highlanders, seeing action in Normandy - two of Graham's war drawings are in the collection of the Imperial War Museum in London. 'Wee Hughie' appeared in 1945 in D C Thomson's Weekly News and ran for twenty years. 'Briggs the Butler' became a fixture in Tatler. Graham drew regularly for Punch and had a series, 'The Eavesdropper,' in The New Yorker. He produced many collections of his cartoons, including 'Graham's Golf Club' and 'Daughter in the House'. Graham's best known creation, Fred Basset, is a comic strip about a thinking Basset Hound which began in the Daily Mail on 8 July 1963. It has since been syndicated around the world.

He provided a series of humorous cartoons for the Gas Council's Sales Training Manual, mostly featuring a hapless salesman in his interactions with potential customer housewives.

Graham died on 3 December 1991 in Ticehurst, East Sussex, aged 73.

== Bibliography ==
- Please Sir I've Broken My Arm (1959)
- The Doctor and the Eavesdropper (1964)
- Graham's Golf Club (1965)
- Oh Sidney Not the Walnut Tree (1966)
- To the Office and Back (1967)
- Normally I Never Touch It (1968)
- Daughter in the House (1969)
- All the Other Men Have Mellowed (1974)
