= StarStuff =

- Genre: Space and Astronomy News
- Language: English

Cast and voices
- Hosted by: Stuart Gary

Publication
- Original release: 1998 – December 2015
- Provider: ABC NewsRadio (1998–June 2008); ABC Science Online (July 2008–2015)
- Updates: Weekly

Related
- Website: Official website (2005–2008); Official website (2008–2015); Twitter (2009–2015)

SpaceTime with Stuart Gary

Publication
- Original release: February 2016 –
- Updates: Three per week (as of 2026)

Related
- Website: spacetimewithstuartgary.com

StarStuff is an Australian space and astronomy program compiled, edited, and presented by Stuart Gary. It was initially broadcast on ABC NewsRadio (1998–2008), before being relaunched as a weekly podcast hosted by ABC Science Online (2008–2015). In 2016, the show transitioned to become an independent podcast, SpaceTime with Stuart Gary. It is one of the most popular astronomy podcasts in Australia, and in 2024, Chartable ranked it as a top 100 science podcast by global reach.

== History ==
After commencing his career as an announcer and journalist in commercial radio, Stuart Gary joined the Australian Broadcasting Corporation (ABC) as a news journalist in 1989. In 1994, he moved to ABC NewsRadio, then known as the Parliamentary and News Network, a newly launched service with the mandate of providing a continuous news radio broadcast.

Gary's interest in science was sparked when NewsRadio's founder and inaugural manager Dr Ian Wolfe tasked him with producing a short report on loop quantum gravity. StarStuff was first broadcast in 1998, initially as a weekly five-minute space news segment, though by 1999 it had grown to become a half-hour show. Its name was taken from the quote "We are made of star-stuff", as popularised by Carl Sagan in his 1973 book The Cosmic Connection: An Extraterrestrial Perspective. The program was broadcast on NewsRadio every Sunday night between 1998 and 2008, with a replay the following Saturday evening.

StarStuff was designed as an hour-long science news bulletin wrapping up all the past week's developments and advances in science and technology. StarStuff's strict news bulletin format made it unique in Australian science broadcasting. The show was designed as a one-person operation with the presenter Stuart Gary, also sourcing, writing and editing the program on top of his regular evening show, five nights a week. StarStuff's material was sourced from ABC news and current affairs reports, syndicated wires copy, and scientific peer reviewed journals.

The ABC was an early adopter of podcasting technology, conducting its first trial in December 2004. NewsRadio began co-releasing StarStuff as a podcast in mid-2006, having previously only supported the direct downloading of recordings from the station website.

In 2008, StarStuff was axed. After numerous complaints to the ABC, the show was restarted as a podcast published by ABC Science Online.

As part of ABC Science Online, StarStuff averaged over a million downloads a year. The complete StarStuff program was also broadcast in the United States on Science 360 Radio.

On 1 July 2015 ABC Science Online was incorporated into the ABC's Radio National network (RN). In December 2015 Ben Watts from ABC Multi-platform announced the axing of StarStuff claiming the show’s numbers were not strong enough. The same month, Stuart Gary announced via the official StarStuff Twitter account that he had been made redundant by the ABC. Gary was offered the chance for redeployment within the ABC, but instead resigned to keep StarStuff going as a private venture.

Gary has since renamed the program to SpaceTime.

The program is now produced as a free thrice weekly podcast.

The show is still broadcast coast to coast across the United States on Science 360 Radio. As of July 2017 SpaceTime with Stuart Gary was achieving over 63,000 downloads a week.

== Format ==
Stuart Gary reported on the latest developments with space advancements and sciences. The show explored developments in astronomy, including astrophysics and cosmology. It also covered news in space sciences such as aerospace and rocket development and the history of human space flight. It regularly informed its listeners about the ongoing progress of various missions such as the Mars rovers, Curiosity, and the Saturn Cassini-Huygens Missions.

Stuart Gary also wrote news and feature articles on astronomy and general science for ABC Science.
