= If You're Listening =

Australian Broadcasting Corporation podcast

Cover art for the podcast

If You're Listening is the umbrella title of a series of podcasts and visual presentations produced and presented on Australian ABC radio and television by Matt Bevan. The video specials are also hosted on several video sharing platforms.

== History ==
In 2019, Bevan began writing and presenting a series of occasional specials of variable length under the title "Russia — If You're Listening", with each episode focusing on some aspect of current affairs. His producers for this series were Will Ockenden, Yasmin Parry and Ruby Jones.

- Series one, of 17 episodes broadcast from 14 May 2018 – 10 Sep 2018, begins with Donald Trump's 2013 relationship with Russia and ended with Trump's feud with Robert Mueller. It was produced by Ockenden and Parry; managing editor was Tanya Nolan.
- Series two, of 8 episodes, 25 Mar 2019 – 23 May 2019 begins with Bill Barr's report on Mueller's investigations and ends with George Papadopoulos, Alexander Downer, and Russia's information on Hillary Clinton. Production was by Ockenden and Ruby Jones.
- Series three, of 9 episodes, 23 May 2019 – 16 Dec 2019; attempted assassination in Salisbury to the hack of Democratic National Committee computers. Producers were Ockenden and Jones.
- Season four, of 9 episodes "America — If You're Listening" broadcast 7 Sep 2020 – 2 Nov 2020 begins by contrasting the response to hurricanes Harvey and Irma with Hurricane Maria in Puerto Rico, all in 2017, and concludes with American response to COVID-19 and Trump's feud with Dr Anthony Fauci. It was produced by Ockenden and Parry.
- Season five, of 3 episodes "China — If You're Listening" broadcast 1 Jun 2021 – 11 Jun 2021 charts the rise of Xi Jinping, and it discusses Chinese reaction to Australian critiques. It includes an examination of the report of the Tiananmen Square crackdown read out in a speech by Prime Minister Bob Hawke, which contained details later disavowed.
- Season six, of 8 episodes "Australia — If You're Listening", dealing with Australia's response to CO_{2} and Climate Change. 23 February 2022 to 12 April 2022. The greenhouse effect associated with carbon dioxide was brought to public attention in Australia in 1912 and its atmospheric increase studied by the CSIRO in 1971. It was a major topic in six Australian elections. Production by Ockenden and Sam Dunn.
- Season seven, of 6 episodes, returned to "Russia — If You're Listening", 9 Nov 2022 – 14 December 2022. The legend and legacy of Vladimir Putin, COVID-19 and attack on Ukraine, the story of Volodymyr Zelenskyy, produced by Ockenden and Parry.
- Following series seven came a string of specials — Kamala Harris on 1 Aug 2024

== Visual media ==
Following requests by listeners, in mid-2023 the ABC began producing video versions of his podcasts, with Bevan behind the microphone, in what appears to be a cluttered basement, his commentary illustrated with video footage and diagrams and historic photos, sometimes quirky.

== Crew ==
Matthew Bevan was born and educated in Newcastle, New South Wales. He began his working life as a producer and journalist for ABC radio in 2008 and spent six years as breakfast newsreader for Radio National, alongside Fran Kelly. Bevan was a guest speaker at the 2024 Newcastle Writers' Festival.

Yasmin Parry was the editor from the series' inception to July 2024. Jess O'Callaghan was an audio producer for ABC. She has worked on various Background Briefing programs as well as supporting hosts Fran Kelly and Patricia Karvelas. She was a producer on the program "Carers who kill", which won a UNAA award in 2018
