= Cool Boys and the Frontman =

Australian rock cover band

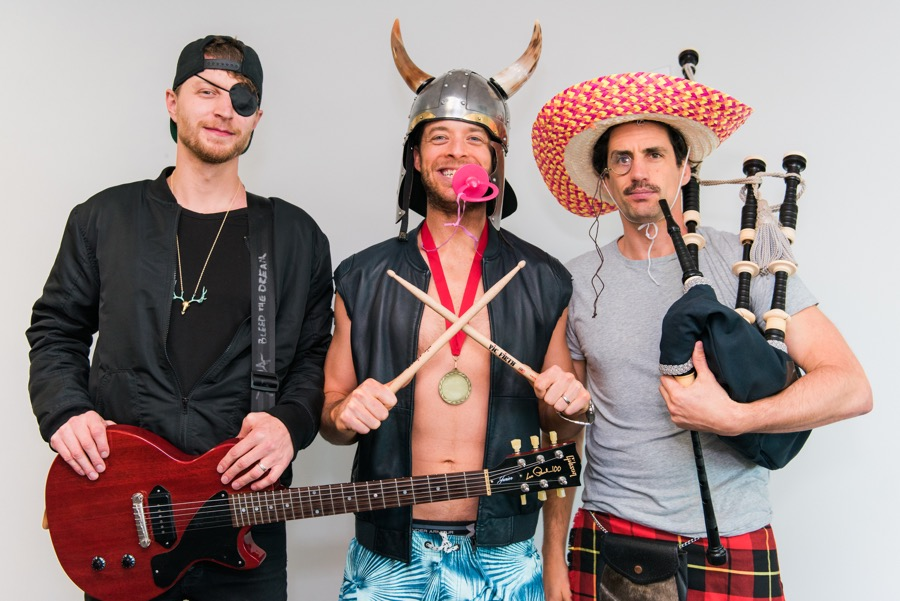
- The band in 2017. (L–R): Jack Post, Hamish Blake and Andy Lee.

Background information
- Origin: Melbourne, Victoria, Australia
- Genres: Rock; covers
- Years active: 2016–present
- Spinoff of: Hamish & Andy
- Members: Hamish Blake; Andy Lee; Jack Post

Cool Boys and the Frontman is an Australian rock cover band consisting of radio hosts and comedians Hamish Blake (drums), Andy Lee (trumpet, keys) and Jack Post (guitar). Their live shows consist of only one song, and they usually perform with a rotating, prominent guest musician, who has included Guy Sebastian, Shannon Noll and the Veronicas. The group was formed in 2016 as a spin-off of the comedy duo's radio show, Hamish & Andy.

== Live shows ==
Their live shows are usually held at unconventional places, including at the formal of a Catholic high school in Wodonga, the re-opening of a regional pub in Rankin Springs, and in the tiny farming town of Pirongia, in Waikato, New Zealand. Reviewing their show at a graduation ball for nurses, the Newcastle Herald concluded the band "may only know one song, but they perform it adequately", giving the show four and a half stars out of five.

=== Tours ===
Cool Boys and the Frontman embarked on the Half Way to the Top Tour in 2016, where they only performed "It's a Long Way to the Top (If You Wanna Rock 'n' Roll)" by AC/DC. They were joined on-stage by Shannon Noll, the Veronicas, the Wiggles and Guy Sebastian.

In 2017, they performed their We Are the Champions Private Jet Tour, only playing the song of the same name by Queen. They were joined on-stage by Vance Joy, Bret McKenzie, Jessica Mauboy and Ricki-Lee. The tour culminated with a farewell show at Margaret Court Arena, Melbourne, on 1 December, which was broadcast as the duo's final radio programme.
