= Fred Basset =

British comic strip created by Alex Graham

- Fred Basset logo featuring two poses of Fred
- Author: Alex Graham (1963–1993); Arran Keith (1993–present)
- Illustrator: Michael Martin (1993–present)
- Website: www.gocomics.com/fredbasset
- Current status/schedule: Current daily strip
- Launch date: 8 July 1963
- Alternate name(s): Wurzel in Germany, Lillo il Cane Saggio (Lillo the wise dog) in Italy, Lorang in Norway, Laban in Sweden, and Retu, Pitko or Koiraskoira in Finland
- Syndicate(s): Chicago Tribune Syndicate (1960s–2001); Universal Press Syndicate/Universal Uclick/Andrews McMeel Syndication (2001–present)
- Genre: Humor

Fred Basset is a British comic strip about a male Basset Hound. The cartoon was created by Scottish cartoonist Alex Graham and published first in the Daily Mail on 8 July 1963.

Fred's cartoon strips are renamed as Wurzel in Germany, Lillo il Cane Saggio (Lillo the wise dog) in Italy, Lorang in Norway, Laban in Sweden and Retu, Pitko or Koiraskoira in Finland.

== Publication history ==
Fred Basset has been published in the United Kingdom newspaper Daily Mail, and latterly The Mail on Sunday, from 1963 to the present. Alex Graham based Fred on his own dog Frieda and drew over 9,000 comic strips.

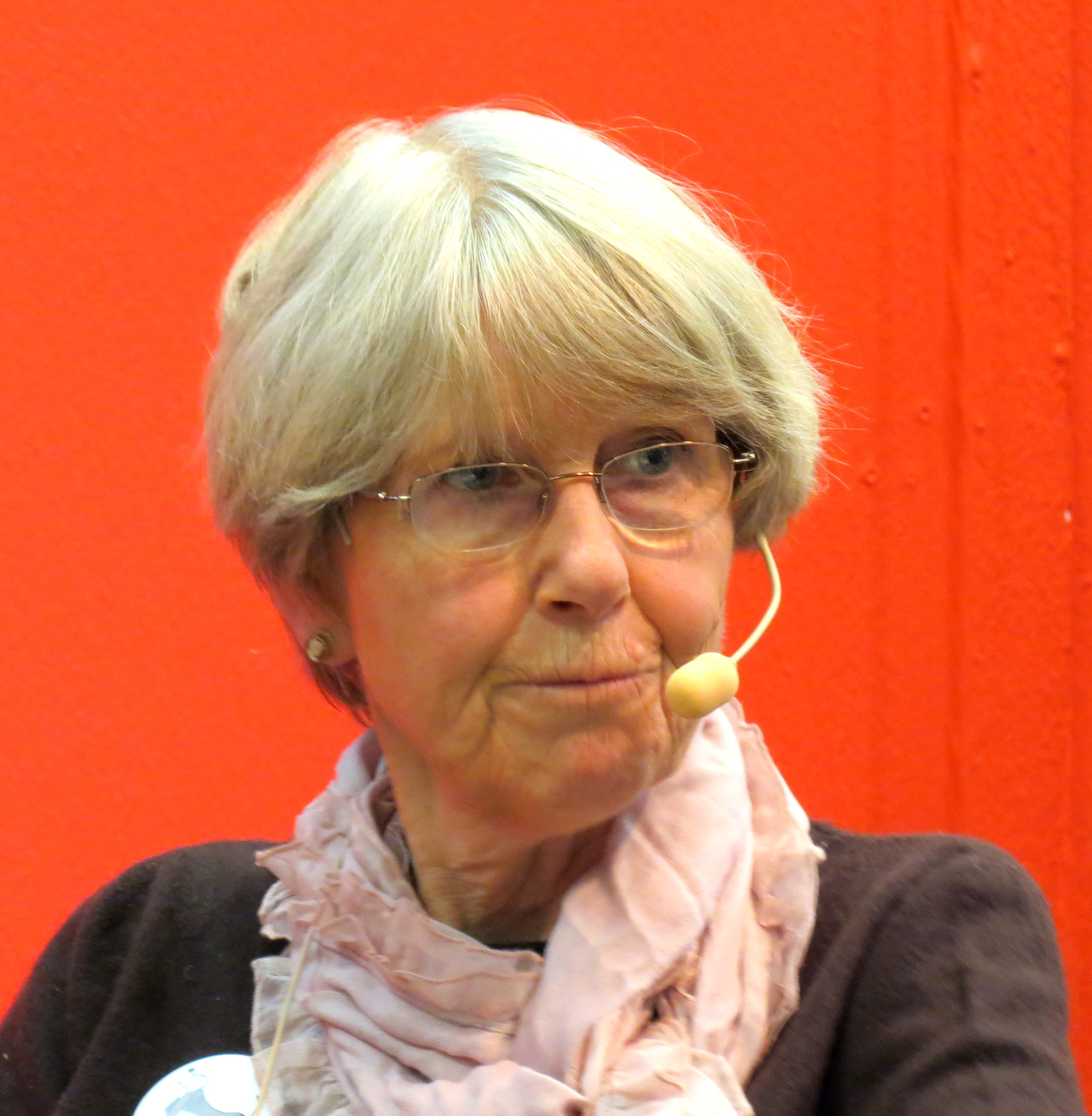
Arran Keith in 2017

Alex Graham died on 3 December 1991. Once the stockpiled 18 months' worth of Alex Graham cartoons had been published, they were continued in Graham's style with artwork by Michael Martin and Graham's daughter, Arran Keith, continuing the family link. They are new cartoons being published, not merely re-runs of earlier ones.

The Michael Martin drawings started out with the general style and humour of the original Graham Freds, but after around 2000 a more casual style of drawing is apparent. The current cartoons still have Alex Graham's original whimsical theme. Fred and his family still live in a pre-1990s era, with only a few hints to modern life, such as satnav and them finally buying a more modern car, as shown in the 2008 annual.

Despite Fred's many years featured in newspapers around the world, he is not as well known as other cartoon characters. Fred Basset is currently syndicated in newspapers using the current Michael Martin strips and is available by email subscription or online direct from GoComics.com and others.

== Characters and story ==
Fred's owners are a middle-aged husband and wife, who are not given names in the strip. The husband is a professional worker in the City of London. He enjoys socialising at his local pubs, The Swan and The Chequers and The Rose and Crown. He is shown often as being temperamental and spends much free time reading the newspaper, walking Fred, and playing golf. The wife manages the house and the family, and has a busy life socialising with friends. She is shown several times as being a bad driver with many accidents with the family car. Known relations to the family are "her rich eccentric" Uncle Albert and her sisters, one in UK and one overseas. A new relation introduced during the mid-1990s was mentioned as "her Aunt Flo". There are no children in Fred's immediate family, although Amanda and the Tucker Twins appear regularly.

The names and areas pictured are made from places and people Alex Graham knew, areas are said to resemble Scotland. Family friends' names would be used, as was Tinker's Wood, taken from a house Graham lived in.

Topical references in the strips are kept to a minimum. One mention of The Beatles and the family's continually recovered lounge sofa suite are among the few giveaways of their age. There are mentions of New Year during 1970 and 1971 and 1 January 1973 when the UK entered the Common Market. The Michael Martin era strips have more topical references and mention of modern appliances, such as mobile phones and a microwave oven, and feature some popular culture references such as 'Am I bovvered?' in the 2008 annual.

The early strips do not generally feature follow-on storylines. Storylines with Fred staying at Jock's house or Uncle Albert staying a few days are among the only times the a story extended beyond the single strip format. A variant of this are sequences of strips over several days having a common theme such as for Christmas or summer holidays, but without narrative continuation. Again, some later Michael Martin strips do follow on for a few days, as with a birthday party mentioned in the 1997 book or stories such as a summer holiday or buying a new car.

The first copyright dates (then for Associated Newspapers) were added to the cartoon strips during 1969.

== The nature of Fred ==
Fred Basset himself seems to have been born during 1959 from comments in the earliest cartoons, and in true cartoon style, seems not to age. Fred's observations can be wry and a certain amount of surrealism is evident, with one early strip having his owners mention they thought the Fred Basset strip in the day's newspaper was "quite amusing" (cartoon 553 in book number 4). Later strips mention both Fred, his owners and passers-by being surreally aware of the newspaper Fred Basset strip and commenting as such, unaware that their own Fred is the character mentioned.

Fred has a certain amount of snobbishness and appreciates the finer qualities of life, as shown clearly in the Alex Graham era strips, with attitudes of the time. He is equally at home misbehaving, being selfish, chasing other dogs and being a coward when more aggressive dogs are around. A small black Scottie (Scottish Terrier) dog, Jock, is a regular companion, as well as Yorky (a Yorkshire Terrier) in later years. A canine girlfriend, Fifi the poodle, appears too. An Alsatian dog, referred to as Brutus, is his adversary. Fred likes chasing cats but freely admits he would not know what to do with one if he caught it.

== Books ==
Fred Basset features in many books worldwide, in the UK a long-running series of books reprints most of the newspaper strips. These are books number 1 (1963) to book 45 (1993). Later books dated by year, 1994 onwards, include the Michael Martin drawn cartoons, as well as Graham's colour ones until the Alex Graham cartoons stock had ended by the 1996 book.

During 1977, a large hardback book entitled Fred Basset and the Spaghetti was published by The Daily Mail. It featured a children's story, not the usual comic strips, written by Alex Graham's son, Neilson, together with illustrations by Alex.

During 1989, a compilation book entitled Fred Basset Bumper Book No 2 was issued. The title has since caused confusion, as there is no Bumper Book No 1 as such. A book published during 1988, Fred Basset 25 Years, a similar compilation, is considered its forerunner.

Colour strips as used in The Mail on Sunday were added from book 36 during 1984. This backlogged the black and white strips, and by book 41 during 1989 they were still using 1984 strips. The next book 42 jumped from book 41 ending with strip 6483 to strip 8159 dated 1990. The missing cartoons remain unpublished since the original newspaper strips.

The distinctive "Fred" handwriting font was supplied by Les Hulme until the early 2000s. A variant of the font is still used today.

The Michael Martin era annuals from 1994 to 2008 featured earlier Alex Graham artwork on the front, yet only featured the contemporary Martin strips inside. The 2009 annual is the first one to feature a Michael Martin front cover.

Fred Basset annuals are usually only printed in black and white, but for years 1984 (book no 36) to 1990 (book no 42) as well as the 1994 and 1995 annuals they were printed with some in colour. The current 'gocomics' online versions are usually in colour. The poor picture reprint quality that marred the 2008 volume is still present in the 2009 book. Many strips look weak and washed out on the finer detail, looking like a photocopy. The 2010 annual is still in black and white, though the printing quality is much better.

One Fred Basset book appeared in the United States during 1969, Meet Fred Basset published as a 'Fawcett Gold Medal Book'. Several books appeared in Australia from 1979 to 1985 and one published in Germany.

As of 2009, Summersdale Publishers UK published the Fred Basset Yearbook and published a gift book featuring some of the cartoons from previous strips in colour. Fred Basset for Garden Lovers was published in September 2009.

The 2010 Annual, released in October 2010, is unusually entitled Fred Basset Yearbook 2010–2011, in an attempt to keep the book selling in 2011. This follows a tradition of annuals since the 1930s which were dated the next year to stop buyers thinking it was an older edition.

A special 50th anniversary annual, Fred Basset Celebrating 50 Years, was published in 2013 by Summersdale Publishers.

== In other media ==
J Salmon Ltd currently print a Fred Basset calendar displaying twelve cartoons drawn by Michael Martin.

Fred Basset, despite being a comic strip character, was read on radio regularly by Hamish Blake throughout Australia on the Today Network's Hamish and Andy Show (weekdays 4-6pm) on Friday afternoons (approx 5:50pm). Andy Lee does his best to stop the reading – trying everything from locking Hamish in a wheelie bin to smashing Hamish's digital camera in order to deter him. However, Hamish always reads the entire comic. The duo also own a real greyhound called " Fred Basset" which is raced in Victoria.

== Fred Basset television cartoon series ==
During mid-1977 a short-lived 5 minute television cartoon of Fred Basset was shown on the BBC, made by Bill Melendez Productions, voiced by actor Lionel Jeffries . 20 episodes were produced.
