= Who the Hell Is Hamish? =

Australian crime podcast

- Who the Hell Is Hamish? cover image
- Format: True crime investigation
- Country of origin: Australia
- Language: English

Cast and voices
- Hosted by: Greg Bearup

Production
- Length: 20–45 minutes

Technical specifications
- Audio format: Stereophonic; MP3

Publication
- No. of episodes: 9
- Original release: 8 February – 21 June 2019
- Provider: The Australian

Related
- Website: Official Webpage

Who the Hell Is Hamish? is an Australian crime podcast by The Australian newspaper reporting on the exploits of serial conman Hamish McLaren. It was hosted by Greg Bearup.

== Overview ==
Hamish McLaren, born Hamish Watson on 29 March 1970, was a confidence trickster who used several aliases, including Hamish Earle McLaren, Hamish Phillip McLaren, Hamish Watson, Hamish McLachlan, Hamish Philip Watson, Hamish Maxwell, and Max Tavita.

Between 2011-2017, while living in Bondi, he stole at least $7.66 million from 15 known victims in Australia, including one he married, and fashion designer Lisa Ho. Overall, his known crimes, in the US, Canada, UK, Hong Kong, and Australia, netted him more than $70 million, given that:

Over three decades and four continents, he stole millions of dollars from the vulnerable and the naïve, using romance, lies and multiple identities to tear lives apart.

McLaren, though investigated and sued numerous times previously, was bankrupted in 2016, and was arrested in Australia in July 2017. He pleaded guilty in June 2019 “to 17 counts of dishonestly obtaining financial advantage by deception and one count of knowingly dealing with the proceeds of crime”. He was sentenced to 16 years, back dated to commence in mid-2017. He will be due for parole in 2029.

== Episodes ==
1. The Day Max Died - details his arrest in 2017
2. Fashion Crimes - introduces his dealings with Lisa Ho
3. The Gatsby of the Great Lakes - covers his time as a jet setter in Canada
4. The Intern - explains his relationship with his stepson’s 16 year-old girlfriend
5. Who the Hell is Phil? - covers his day trading and the killing of his fictional twin brother
6. Kevin from Queensland goes to Canada - from a man who knew him as a ski instructor in both countries
7. On the Couch with Hamish - interviews with ex-girlfriends, including a professional assessment of him as a sociopath
8. The Definition of Evil - highlighting the institutional failures in different countries in preventing his crime spree
9. The Reckoning - recorded post-sentencing

The title of the series comes from McLaren’s then girlfriend reacting to his arrest. At the time, she knew him as Max Tavita. After receiving a text message from “Hamish’s brother-in-law”, she stated “Who the fuck is Hamish?”

== Reception and legacy ==
The investigative podcast was a popular success both in Australia and abroad. It peaked at #1 on the iTunes charts in Australia and the UK and #3 in the US and Canada. It spent a continuous 94 days in the top ten in Australia, with 34 day at #1.

The podcast was a podcast pick of the week by The Guardian, writing "It's incredible to hear how much trust people put in him, but easy to see how they fell for the ruse." The Sydney Morning Herald called it a "Blue Velvet journey into Australian suburbia." It was featured as a favourite true crime podcast of the week by New York magazine.

=== Television series ===
On 16 August 2026, it was announced a television series based on the podcast had wrapped filming in Queensland.
