= Greg Bearup =

Australian author, journalist, election expert

- Born: 3 April 1969 (age 57); Guyra, New South Wales, Australia
- Occupations: Journalist, author

Greg Bearup is an Australian journalist, who has worked for Good Weekend and the Weekend Australian Magazine.

== Career ==
Greg Bearup started as a cadet at The Armidale Express in 1988. He then went on to work at The Inverell Times, The Newcastle Herald and The Sydney Morning Herald, working as chief police reporter, an investigative journalist and general reporter. In 2001 started working for the Good Weekend magazine where he was twice awarded a Walkley Award for his writing. The screenplay for the film Suburban Mayhem was based on the feature "Death Surrounds Her". In 2012 he moved to The Weekend Australian Magazine where he again was awarded a Walkley Award. In 2015 he moved to India for one year to become The Australian South Asia correspondent. In 2025 he started working for The Australian Financial Review.

In 2004/5 he took two years' leave from his job at the magazine and worked for the United Nations on the elections for Afghan refugees in Pakistan and Iraqis living in Syria. He then spent six months in Bamyan, in the remote mountains of Central Afghanistan, working on the Afghan Parliamentary Elections in 2005. During this time he also filed for The Guardian, The Times and the Christian Science Monitor.

== Publications ==
In 2008, Bearup travelled around Australia in a caravan with his partner and their son. The adventure was documented in the book Adventures in Caravanastan: Around Australia at 80ks.

In 2012, he published Exit Wounds, written with Major General John Cantwell. The book details Cantwell's extraordinary war service and his ongoing battle with post traumatic stress disorder. He fought in the first Gulf War in 1990-1991 and then again in Baghdad in 2006. In 2010, he was the commander of the Australian troop in Afghanistan and the wider region.

In 2019, Bearup hosted the True Crime Podcast Who the Hell is Hamish? which investigated the life and crimes of serial conman Hamish McLaren. It peaked at #1 on the iTunes charts in Australia and the UK.

== Awards ==
- 2014 Walkley Award: The Australian "That’s my boy: kids witness war’s horror" / "Plotter’s nephew in Syrian combat" / "Aussie fighters leading extremist PR: ASIO"
- 2003 Walkley Award: Good Weekend "On the inside no-one can hear you scream"
- 2001 Walkley Award: Good Weekend "Death Surrounds Her"

== See also ==
- John Cantwell
