= Tapt News =

Radio news program in Australia

Tapt News is a radio news service providing the half-hourly radio news bulletins to radio stations across Australia.

== History ==
On 16 September 2009, Macquarie Radio Network shut down its news website, livenews.com.au after two years of existence, citing poor financial returns.

In April 2015, following the merger of Macquarie Radio Network and Fairfax Radio Network, the newsroom of 2UE Sydney was closed and replaced with the 2GB feed. Local bulletins on 3AW, 4BC and 6PR now take the Macquarie National News branding. This branding was retained until the renaming of Macquarie Media as Nine Radio in 2020.

In July, the newsroom shared between 1116 SEN and 3MP 1377 in Melbourne was closed, replaced with the Macquarie National News service from 3AW.

On 1 January 2020, the Macquarie service was replaced by Nine News, which commenced providing the half-hourly radio news bulletins to radio stations across Australia.

== Stations ==
Bold signifies a Tapt Media owned station.

=== State bulletins ===
==== New South Wales ====
- **2GB**
- **2UE**
- Alive 90.5
- Eagle FM
- GNFM
- Hawkesbury Radio
- Hope 103.2
- SWR 99.9 FM

==== Victoria ====
- **3AW**
- 1116 SEN
- 3BA
- 3MP
- 3NE
- **Magic 1278**
- Radio KLFM

==== Queensland ====
- **4BC**
- **4BH**

==== Western Australia ====
- **6PR**
- 6IX

=== National bulletin ===
==== New South Wales ====
- Alive 90.5 Baulkham Hills
- 2AAA Wagga Wagga
- 2AY Albury-Wodonga
- 2MIA Griffith
- 2QN Deniliquin
- 2WEB Bourke

==== Victoria ====
- Bay 93.9 Geelong (Weekends only)
- Edge FM 102.1 Wangaratta
- K Rock 95.5 Geelong (Weekends only)
- 3CS Colac
- 3HA Hamilton
- 3SH Swan Hill
- 3WM Horsham
- 3YB Warrnambool
- 3KND Melbourne

==== Queensland ====
- Hot Country Queensland Dalby / Goondiwindi / St George / Roma
- West FM Charleville
- 4HI Emerald
- 4LM Mount Isa
- 4SB Kingaroy
- 4VL Charleville
- 4ZR Roma

==== Northern Territory ====
- 104.1 Territory FM Darwin

=== Former stations ===
- MTR 1377 Melbourne
- Sky Sports Radio Sydney / Regional New South Wales (replaced with local newsroom at weekdays)
- 2CH
