= Sports Entertainment Network =

Australian media company

- Formation: 2006
- Type: Broadcast; Digital
- Headquarters: Melbourne, Victoria, Australia
- CEO: Craig Hutchison
- Subsidiaries: 1116 SEN; SEN Track
- Website: sportsentertainmentnetwork.com.au
- Formerly called: Crocmedia (2006–2020)

Sports Entertainment Network (SEN), formerly Crocmedia, is an Australian radio and television distribution company established in 2006. SEN's parent company is Sports Entertainment Group (SEG), formerly Pacific Star Network.

== History ==
Sports Entertainment Network was established in 2006 as Crocmedia by journalists James Swanwick and Craig Hutchison. The company was originally formed in the United States as a public relations company selling entertainment and news content before shifting to focusing on sports.

Crocmedia entered the mainstream in late 2009 when it was announced that it would operate a live AFL radio service that would be syndicated throughout regional areas. Many regional broadcasters, including Ace Radio stations, 3BA, 3NE and Edge FM, replaced their existing feed – typically 3AW or Triple M – with the new Crocmedia feed. Crocmedia achieved further publicity by signing veteran broadcasters Sandy Roberts and Rex Hunt to provide commentary.

Crocmedia generated controversy in Albury-Wodonga in 2010 when 2AY announced that it would replace the popular 3AW program Sports Today with Sportsday. In November 2016, Crocmedia announced program partnership agreements with a number of radio broadcasters, which saw the merger of the metro Sports Today and regional Sportsday programs. From January 2017, Sportsday, with Sports Today hosts Gerard Healy and Dwayne Russell, aired weeknights on 3AW and across regional Victoria and Tasmania. Sportsday later expanded across the country.

Crocmedia received attention in January 2015, after the Federal Circuit Court fined the company $24,000 for breaching the minimum wage conditions of two employees. Judge Riethmuller branded Crocmedia's actions as 'exploitative'.

In January 2018, Pacific Star Network, the owner of SEN radio, confirmed it had acquired 100 per cent of equity in Crocmedia. Under the plan, existing Crocmedia CEO Craig Hutchison became the largest shareholder and CEO of the merged company.

In July 2019, Crocmedia purchased 23 narrowband radio licences across Australia including Sydney, Brisbane, Perth, Gold Coast, Darwin and Alice Springs.

In October 2020, Crocmedia was rebranded Sports Entertainment Network, with the media and content business to share an acronym with its SEN radio stations.

In March 2021, Sports Entertainment Network announced that it would expand into New Zealand, and subsequently acquired TAB NZ's 30 AM and FM broadcast licences. SENZ launched on 19 July 2021. In May 2022, SEN purchased Brisbane radio station 4KQ from its previous owners HT&E.

In November 2023, SENZ was sold to TAB NZ. The transaction included the SENZ brand, app and website and its network of 28 radio frequencies. SENZ was rebranded as Sport Nation on 19 November 2024.

== Programmes ==
=== Radio ===
- AFL Nation (formerly AFL Live)
  - 2AY 1494AM Albury-Wodonga
  - 2BH 567AM Broken Hill
  - 2EC 765AM Bega
  - 2QN 1521AM Deniliquin–Echuca
  - 2WEB 585AM Bourke
  - 2XL 96.1FM Cooma
  - SEN 1116AM Melbourne
  - 3BA 102.3FM Ballarat
  - Gold 1071AM Bendigo
  - 3CS 1134AM Colac
  - 3GG 531AM Warragul (No longer takes any football coverage on weekends)
  - 3HA 981AM Hamilton
  - River 1467AM Mildura
  - 3NE 1566AM Wangaratta
  - 3SH 1332AM Swan Hill
  - 3ST 1629AM Shepparton
  - 3WM 1089AM Horsham
  - 3MGB 101.7FM Mallacoota
  - 3YB 94.5FM Warrnambool
  - 5AU 1242AM Port Augusta
  - 5CC 765AM Port Lincoln
  - 5CS 1044AM Port Pirie
  - 5MU 1125AM Murray Bridge
  - 5RM 801AM Berri
  - 8HA 900AM Alice Springs
  - Gold 1242AM Traralgon / 98.3 FM Bairnsdale, Victoria
  - Gold 1071AM Maryborough / 98.3FM Ararat, Victoria
  - Territory 104.1FM Darwin
  - Red FM Regional and Remote Western Australia
- A-League Radio (formerly A-League Live and Football Nation)
- Big Bash Nation
- Off The Bench
- Sportsday Queensland
  - 4AY 873AM Innisfail
  - 4CC 927AM Gladstone
  - 4HI 1143AM Emerald
  - 4LM 666AM Mount Isa
  - 4SB 1071AM Kingaroy
  - 4VL 918AM Charleville
  - 4ZR 1476AM Roma
  - 88.7 KIK-FM Mareeba
  - Zinc 96.1FM Sunshine Coast
  - Zinc 100.7FM Townsville
  - Zinc 101.9FM Mackay
  - Zinc 102.7FM Cairns
- Sportsday South Australia
  - 5AA 1395AM Adelaide
  - 5AU 1242AM Port Augusta
  - 5CC 765AM Port Lincoln
  - 5CS 1044AM Port Pirie
  - 5MU 1125AM Murray Bridge
  - 5RM 801AM Berri
- Sportsday Victoria
  - 2AY 1494AM Albury-Wodonga
  - 2BH 567AM Broken Hill
  - 3AW 693AM Melbourne
  - 3BA 102.3FM Ballarat
  - 3CS 1134AM Colac
  - 3HA 981AM Hamilton
  - 3SH 1332AM Swan Hill
  - 3WM 1089AM Horsham
  - River 1467AM Mildura
  - 3YB 94.5FM Warrnambool
  - Gold 1242AM Traralgon / 98.3 FM Bairnsdale
  - Gold Central Victoria 1071AM Maryborough / 98.3FM Bendigo, Victoria
- Sportsday Western Australia
  - 6PR 882AM Perth
  - Spirit Radio Network 98.1FM Geraldton
  - Spirit Radio Network 102.9FM Broome
  - Spirit Radio Network 621AM Bunbury
  - Spirit Radio Network 1026AM Port Hedland
  - Spirit Radio Network 1260AM Karratha
  - Spirit Radio Network Regional and Remote Western Australia
- Trade Radio
  - afl.com.au

=== Television ===
- Footy WA
  - Channel 9 Perth
  - WIN Television Regional Western Australia
- Footy SA
  - Channel 9 Adelaide
  - WIN Television Regional South Australia
- Off The Bench TV (Victorian edition)
  - Seven Regional Victoria
- Off The Bench TV (Western Australian edition)
  - 7mate Regional Western Australia
- Future Stars
  - Nine Network
  - WIN Television Regional Victoria
