= Justin Smith (presenter) =

Australian radio producer

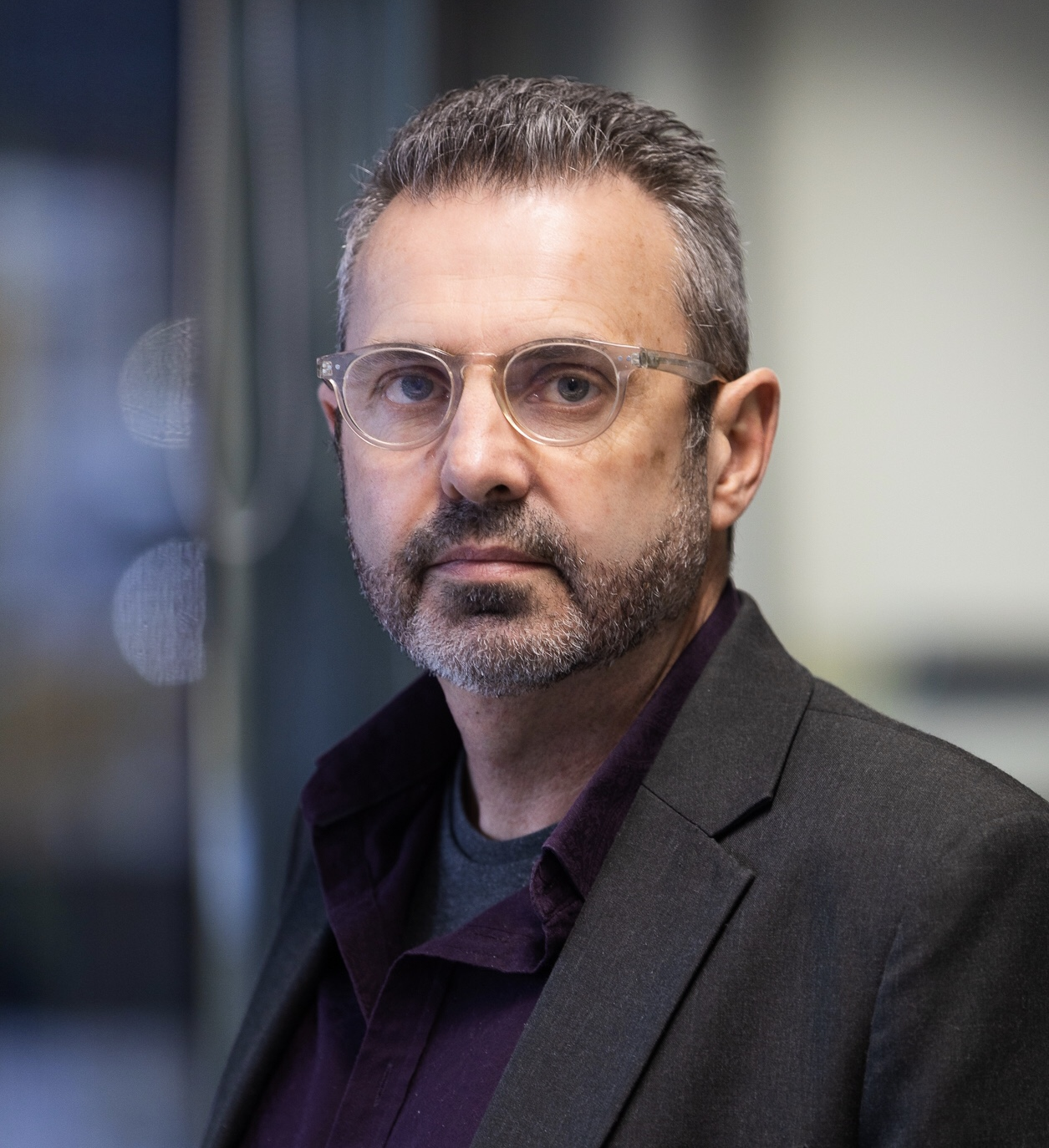
- 2020 by MoreGrace
- Born: 16 December 1968 (age 57); Echuca, Australia
- Occupations: Author, journalist, broadcaster

Justin Smith (born 16 December 1968) is an Australian author, journalist and broadcaster. He is a columnist with Melbourne newspaper the Herald Sun and appears on Sunrise and Sky News Australia. He is the author of three novels, the most recent being Cooper Not Out released in January 2022.

== Early life ==
Smith was born in Echuca, Australia, the son of dairy farmers. He attended Echuca Village Primary School and Echuca Secondary College.

== Radio career ==
Smith has worked in radio across New South Wales and Victoria since he was 17 years old, including 2QN Deniliquin, NSW, 3SH Swan Hill, Victoria, 2LF Young, NSW, 3BO/3CV Bendigo, Victoria, 2AY/ Star FM Albury, NSW and 3AW Melbourne, Victoria. He commenced his metropolitan radio career with 3AW and then moved to 2UE, both Fairfax Radio Network stations. Since December 2024 he has been a fill-in presenter on ABC Radio Melbourne hosting the Mornings and other programs.

=== 3AW ===
Smith started at 3AW in 2001 and worked on a number of programs before becoming a producer of the high rating talkback radio show, 3AW Mornings with Neil Mitchell. He was appointed the senior producer in 2002 and left that role at the end of 2013 to take up a primetime on-air role at 2UE. He was also the alternate host for around five weeks per year when Mitchell took leave and he was regularly on air with Mitchell providing his input.

Each weekday Smith presented a preview of 3AW Mornings with Neil Mitchell on the 3AW program Australia Overnight. In August 2013, he also contributed a weekly segment on 3AW's Breakfast with Ross and John show, consistently the highest rating radio program in Melbourne. The segment focused on current newsworthy events in Melbourne.

On Anzac Day in April 2013, Smith produced and presented a series of national radio broadcasts for the Fairfax Radio Network including the Tarin Kowt Dawn Service in Afghanistan. As part of the preparation for this assignment, Smith, producer Tom Andronas and technician Stephen Beers were required to undergo a week's training to acclimatise with the conditions the troops experience. These broadcasts were relayed across Australia as a part of Australia's tribute to its war dead and wounded on what is a significant national day for Australians, with large numbers attending traditional dawn memorial services.

His last day at 3AW was 10 January 2014, when he finished his summer fill-in role covering Neil Mitchell's program. Mitchell came on air to thank Smith for his work, saying, "All the best, I wanted to wish you well of course, obviously, and to thank you. We've had a very successful 11 years on air and you've been a huge part of that, you've made it happen."

=== 2UE ===
Smith took over as the presenter in the Drive time slot (3 pm-6 pm weekdays) on Sydney metropolitan station 2UE on 20 January 2014, until December 2015.

== Writing ==
Smith is a writer and has been published in Fairfax media outlets including The Age newspaper and 3AW online.

== Awards ==
Smith has won six Australian Commercial Radio Awards (ACRAs) as a writer, presenter and producer. They include:-

- 2008 Australian Commercial Radio Awards (ACRAs). Best Show Producer – Talk & Current Affairs
- 2009 Australian Commercial Radio Awards (ACRAs). Best Producer.
- 2010 Australian Commercial Radio Awards (ACRAs). Best Producer.
- 2011 Australian Commercial Radio Awards (ACRAs). Best Producer.

With the Neil Mitchell program, Smith was a part of winning four Melbourne Press Club Quill Awards and the 2013 Walkley Award for breaking the news of Ford closures, and the 2012 Community Service Award for a joint broadcast with gay community station Joy 94.9, focusing on the issues around depression rates in gay teenagers.

== Charity and community work ==
Smith is a member of the advisory board of the children's charity tlc for kids and a board member of the Australian Childhood Foundation.

In August 2013, Smith was publicly thanked by the Premier of Victoria, Denis Napthine, for helping to organise an on-air auction on 3AW that raised $170,000 to provide equipment for road trauma victims being treated at Melbourne's Alfred Hospital.

== Personal life ==
Smith is married to Merryn Kelly. He studied radio at the Australian Film, Television and Radio School (AFTRS) and Australian politics at Charles Sturt University.
