= Malcolm T. Elliott =

Australian radio personality (1946–2019)

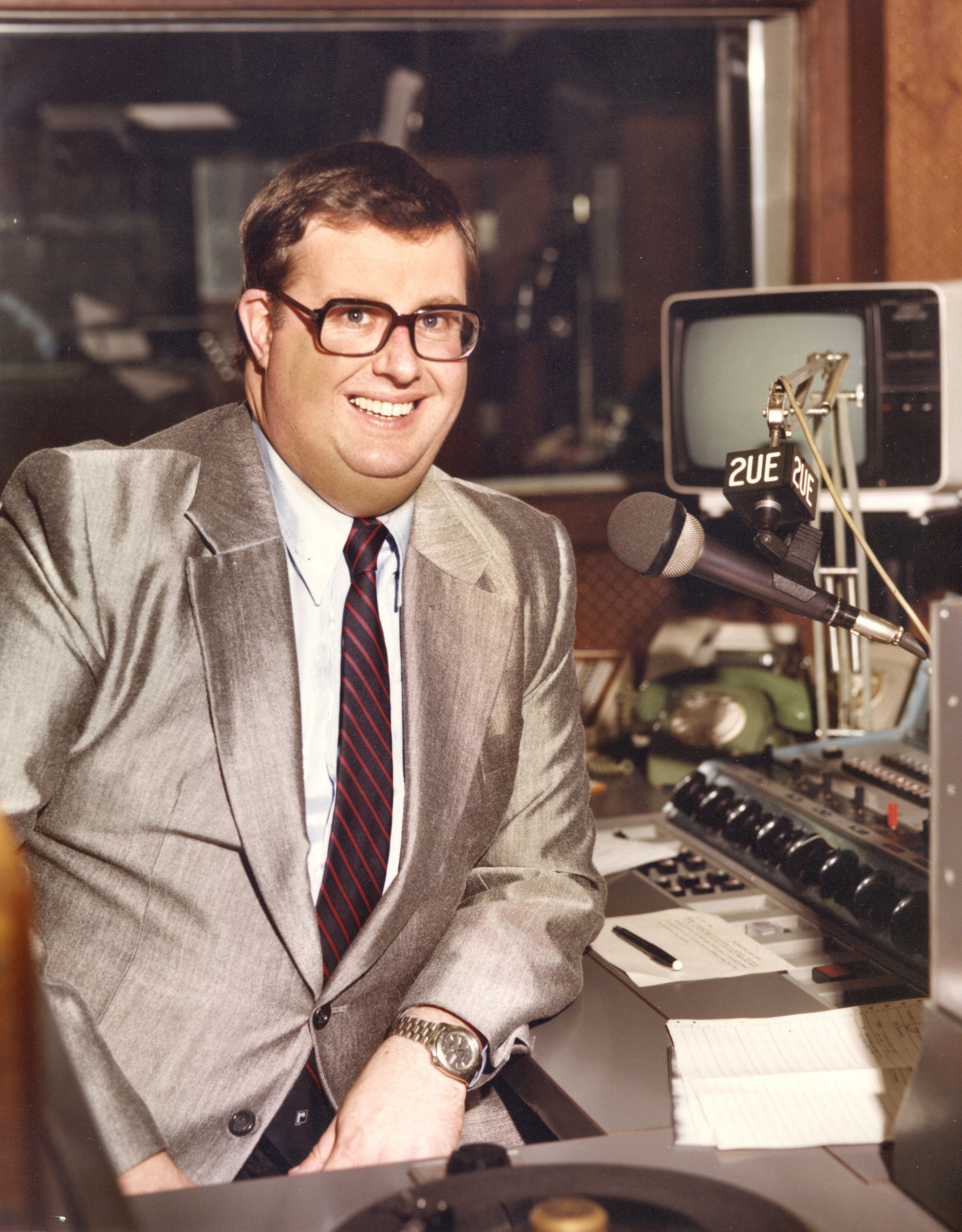
- Malcolm T. Elliott in studio
- Born: Malcolm Allan Elliott; 13 May 1946; Coburg, Victoria, Australia
- Died: 8 August 2019 (aged 73); Lismore, New South Wales, Australia
- Occupations: Radio broadcaster; TV host; journalist; marketing executive
- Years active: 1967–2004
- Known for: Presenter at radio station 2GB and 2UW

Malcolm T. Elliott (13 May 1946 – 8 August 2019) was an Australian radio personality, television host and journalist.

== Early life and education ==
He was born Malcolm Allan Elliott at Coburg, Victoria, on 13 May 1946, to Allan Hamilton Elliott and Marion Rose Elliott (née Walters).

== Career ==
Elliott started out as a printing compositor with Leader Group newspapers in Melbourne. He entered radio at the completion of his apprenticeship in February 1967 at 3NE Wangaratta, moved after only six months to 3SR Shepparton where he hosted the successful breakfast show. After eight weeks at 2TM Tamworth, in late-1969 he joined 3UL Warragul as breakfast announcer, then moved to 2KO and 2HD Newcastle before returning south to read television news in Albury at AMV-4 Albury. In 1970 he was selected to join the 2SM newsroom and covered the first Papal Tour of Australia. He was then invited by Michael Schildberger and Rhett Walker to join Melbourne's number one station 3AK as deputy news director.

Elliott joined 5AD in 1970 hosting the 8pm to 12 shift and launched a half-hour evening News programme Newsday. In 1971 he was recruited by Canadian Programmer Peter Harding for 4BK Brisbane's Breakfast show and was an immediate success, bringing attention from 2UW. In 1972 Elliott returned to Sydney to present the breakfast show on radio 2UW Sydney from 1972 to 1976, and again from 1978 to 1979 and, with sidekick's Peter Shanahan and Tony Dickinson, the trio (one of the first ever breakfast teams) rated 16.5%, the highest ever until that time in that station's history. In 1985 he returned to 2UW for the morning show which lasted a year before leaving the station.

In 1975 Elliott was voted "The Most Popular Radio Personality" in NSW by TV Week and awarded a Logie.

Elliott also worked for the ill-fated mellow rock 87-2GB in 1976–1977, 2KY 1980 and 2UE 1983–1984,1988–89 and 1992–2004.

== 24-hour lock-in ==
On 14 and 15 January 1974 he "pretended" to cut the electric locks on the 2UW studio doors and locked himself in the studio for 24 hours, while the other presenters adjourned to the local "City Hotel". Thousands of people filed through the studios to see him and people all over Sydney turned off their television sets and "watched" the radio. The public seemed to readily accept the "lock-in" as the gag it was, whilst management at other stations local and interstate believed that he had taken over the station. It resulted in a spike in the next ratings figures which took 2UW to its highest ever breakfast rating to that time.

== Bali comments ==
In May 2005, in an exchange with a caller to a radio program on 2GB Sydney he was hosting about a law case in Bali involving Australian drug smuggler Schapelle Corby, Elliott caused controversy when he racially vilified the Indonesian judges hearing the case, as well as then Indonesian President Susilo Bambang Yudhoyono and former Indonesian President Megawati Sukarnoputri, as follows:

Elliott: I believe right now Bambam Yodhoyono [sic] is sitting up there and his hands are tied because it's a legal matter. Wham Bam Thank You Mam Yiddi-yono is going to be called into all of these — well, that's what he is, isn't he — have you ever seen them? Whoa, give them a banana and away they go ...

The judges don't even speak English, mate, they're straight out of the trees if you excuse my expression.

Caller: Don't you think that disrespects the whole of our neighbouring nation?

Elliott: I have total disrespect for our neighbouring nation my friend. Total disrespect.

And then we get this joke of a trial, and it's nothing more than a joke. An absolute joke the way they sit there. And they do look like the three wise monkeys, I'll say it. They don't speak English, they read books, they don't listen to her. They show us absolutely no respect those judges.

What about that little midget woman who was up there, what was her name? Midget. Who was the president? Megawati. Megawati midget, yeah. Goodness.

Writing in The Spectator, Australian journalist Eric Ellis commented that: "Remarks like this, if uttered in Indonesia or, indeed, most Western countries, would have resulted in Elliott’s appearing before some sort of race relations tribunal, copping a heavy fine and possibly a jail sentence, certainly the sack."

== Television ==
Elliott's television work included In Wollongong Tonight on WIN-4 in 1981, as a last minute replacement for Eric Walters who felt uncomfortable with the proposed format. Elliott had worked at Channel 7 Adelaide hosting "Long-Weekend" movie marathons for PD Lynton Taylor. When Taylor joined the Nine Network in Sydney in 1973 he appointed Elliott as one of the 5 regulars of Celebrity Squares along with Bert Newton, Don Lane, Chelsea Brown, and Ugly Dave Gray, who gave Elliott the nickname of Malcolm T-shirt Elliott.

== Marketing and No 1 ==
In the 1980s, Elliott graduated from the University of New South Wales with a business marketing diploma and held a number of high-profile positions. He was marketing director of News Limited, Westfield, RCA Records, Domino Computers and CMS Computer Enhancements. He hosted 2GB afternoons in 1992–93. From 1993 to 2004 he worked at 2UE-4BC as the Sunday mornings presenter, rating number one for seven years and, at the same time, was the night time fill-in for Stan Zemanek.

== Health ==
On 11 June 2004, Elliott underwent quintuple bypass surgery after experiencing shortness of breath whilst on holiday at his new home in Northern Rivers region of New South Wales. He left 2UE in October 2004 to retire to the Northern Rivers. In March 2010 he underwent twelve weeks of radiotherapy at Coffs Harbour Hospital for prostate cancer. On 12 October 2015 he underwent heart ablation surgery and the inserting of a pacemaker/defibrillator at Pindara Hospital at Benowa Waters in Queensland. On 28 January 2016 he had his gallbladder removed and an umbilical hernia repaired at the John Flynn Hospital at Tugun.

== Later years ==
While retired from day to day broadcasting, his international date files, "It Happened Today", were used extensively on 2UE's and 2GB's Alan Jones breakfast show from 1992, and were also featured in Webster's CD Encyclopaedia in 1997. He married Brenda Holland on 30 August 1975 and had one daughter (Alicia, born November 1975). They divorced in 1992. He remained single for nine years until he married a widow with three children, Pamela Miller (née Bunt) from Glenhaven in Sydney on 17 February 2001. In 2018 he was living at his property at Goonellabah (a suburb of Lismore) in northern New South Wales.

Elliott was found dead on 8 August 2019 in a motel room in Lismore.
