= Ace Radio =

Radio company based in Melbourne

- Company type: Private
- Industry: Broadcast radio; Print publishing; Digital marketing
- Predecessor: Associated Communication Enterprises
- Founded: 1984
- Headquarters: South Melbourne, Victoria, Australia
- Areas served: Victoria; Southern New South Wales
- Key people: Mark Taylor (CEO)
- Owners: Rowly Paterson; Judy Paterson
- Number of employees: 200+ (2022)
- Website: www.aceradio.com.au

Ace Radio Broadcasters is an Australian media company. Formed in 1984, it operates 21 commercial radio stations in Victoria and southern New South Wales, as well as the digital marketing agency Ace Digital and The Weekly Advertiser, a free newspaper distributed across the Wimmera region.

== History ==
Ace Radio Broadcasters was founded in 1984, following the acquisition of radio station 3HA in Hamilton, Victoria by Associated Communication Enterprises, owners of the Melbourne newspaper Truth. The group acquired 3CS Colac in 1985 and, by 1986, had control of 3SH Swan Hill and 3WM Horsham. As of 1994, the company was in the joint control of Geoff and Helen Handbury and Rowly and Judy Paterson, and had additional interests in radio stations in Wollongong, Shepparton and Geelong.

The company continued to expand in the late 1990s and into the 2000s. Divesting itself of 3SR and Sun FM Shepparton and Bay FM Geelong, in 1995 the company acquired 3TR Traralgon and 3YB Warrnambool. In 1996, Ace Radio commenced the roll-out of FM radio in its markets, launching Mixx FM branded stations in Horsham, Swan Hill and Colac, with Mixx FM Hamilton and Coast FM 95.3 Warrnambool launching in 2002. Also in 2002, 3TR converted to the FM band as TRFM, with 3GV launched on the former AM frequency.

In September 2005, Ace Radio purchased 2AY from Macquarie Regional RadioWorks, which the latter was forced to divest following its acquisition of DMG Regional Radio.

In June 2016, Ace Radio's stations were added to the iHeartRadio platform in Australia, with the iHeartRadio Thumbs Up Countdown launched across the network's six 'Hit Music' FM stations.

In August 2017, it was announced that Ace Radio would acquire 2QN and Edge FM Deniliquin, New South Wales from Rich Rivers Radio, and 3NE and Edge FM Wangaratta from North East Broadcasters.

In June 2018, Ace Radio ceased operation of the Radio Training Institute. Launched in 1984 as the Melbourne Radio School, the institute had been operated by Ace in South Melbourne since 2003.

From 14 January 2022, Ace Radio took over the operations of three metropolitan stations from Nine Entertainment, under a lease arrangement.

From 16 January 2023, Ace Radio will supply Southern Cross Austereo's Hit Network programs, including the Carrie & Tommy Drive show and Nath & Emma to over six radio stations.

== Radio stations ==
As of 2022, Ace Radio Broadcasters operates 21 radio stations.

Eight of these stations form their 'Heritage' network, featuring local news, music and syndicated talkback programming targeted at a 40+ audience:

- 2AY 1494 Albury/Wodonga
- 2QN 1521 Deniliquin/Echuca
- 3CS 1134 Colac
- 3HA 981 Hamilton
- 3SH 1332 Swan Hill
- 3WM 1089 Horsham
- 3YB FM 94.5 Warrnambool
- Gold 1242 Traralgon

Eight stations form the 'Hit Music' network, targeting an 18-39 audience with hot adult contemporary music and syndicated programming:

- Coast FM 95.3 Warrnambool
- Edge FM 102.1 Wangaratta
- Edge FM 102.5 Deniliquin
- Mixx FM 88.9 Hamilton
- Mixx FM 101.3 Horsham
- Mixx FM 106.3 Colac
- Mixx FM 107.7 Swan Hill
- TRFM 99.5 Traralgon

One station is positioned as 'Better Music Variety', targeting a 40+ audience:

- Star FM 92.1 Wangaratta

One station is positioned as 'Easy Music', targeting a 55+ audience:

- 3MP 1377 Melbourne

Three stations are positioned as 'Classic Hits', targeting a 55+ audience:

- Magic 1278 Melbourne (leased from Tapt Media)
- 4BH 1116 Brisbane (leased from Tapt Media)
- 2UE 954 Sydney (leased from Tapt Media)

== Programming ==
While programming varies in each market, both AM and FM stations broadcast a variety of locally produced, as well as nationally networked, programmes.

AM/Heritage stations

- The Morning Rush with Sean Cullen, Matthew Monk & Niamh McMahon (excludes 2AY Albury)
- Country Today
- Mornings with Tom Elliott (Tapt Media syndication)
- Drive with Jacqueline Felgate (Tapt Media syndication) (2AY & 3SH only)
- Sportsday (Sports Entertainment Network)
- Nights with Denis Walter (Tapt Media syndication) (excludes 3YB & GOLD)
- Australia Overnight (Tapt Media syndication) (excludes 3YB & GOLD)
- Reel Adventures (Sports Entertainment Network)
- Off The Bench (Sports Entertainment Network)

FM stations

- The Morning Crew with Gabi and Dan (excludes Mixx FM Colac)
- Carrie & Tommy (Southern Cross Austereo syndication) (excludes both Edge FMs)
- Nath & Emma (Southern Cross Austereo syndication) (excludes both Edge FMs)
