= Greg Evans (television host) =

Australian radio and television presenter (born 1953)

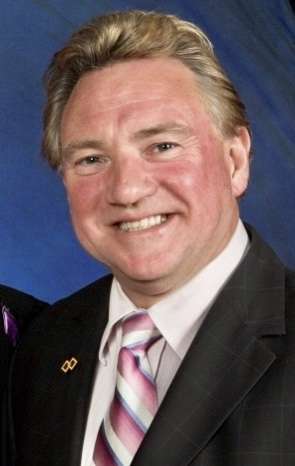
- Greg Evans, radio and TV host
- Born: 17 April 1953 (age 73); Melbourne, Victoria, Australia
- Occupations: Radio and Television Personality/Presenter
- Years active: 1971−present
- Known for: Perfect Match; 3AW radio

Greg Evans (born 17 April 1953) is an Australian television and radio host with a career spanning over four decades. He is best known for his roles on popular programs such as Perfect Match and for his contributions to Australian radio, where he was a leading figure in the 1970s and 1980s.

== Early career ==
Evans began his broadcasting career in 1971 at regional radio station 3CS in Colac, hosting the breakfast program. He later worked at 3CV in Maryborough and 2KA in Katoomba before joining Melbourne's 3XY, where he hosted the drive-time slot for seven years. During this period, his show consistently rated number one, cementing his reputation as a prominent radio personality. From 1975 to 1981, Evans won the TV Week King of Pop Awards for Most Popular DJ in Victoria for six consecutive years, the only recipient in the award's history.

== Transition to Television ==
Evans transitioned to television in the late 1970s, appearing as a regular presenter on The Mike Walsh Show. In 1981, he co-hosted Network Ten's Together Tonight with Kerry Armstrong. After a brief return to radio at 3MP in Melbourne, Evans took on his most iconic television role as the host of Network Ten's Perfect Match in 1984. He hosted the show until 1986 and returned for its final season in 1989. In addition to Perfect Match, Evans hosted Network Ten's talent competition Star Search (1985–1986) and later presented Nine Network programs Say G’Day and Crossfire in 1987. When Perfect Match was relaunched as Blind Date in 1991, Evans reprised his hosting duties alongside Nicky Buckley, completing a combined total of over 1,500 episodes across both iterations.

== Return to Radio ==
Evans returned to radio in the 1990s, co-hosting 3AW's breakfast show alongside Sam Newman in 1992. He subsequently joined Gold 104.3, hosting drive-time and later breakfast programs until 1998. During this time, he also appeared on television as a co-host of Network Ten's Monday to Friday in 1997. From 1999 to 2003, Evans worked at Melbourne talk radio station 3AK, taking on various roles, including hosting the breakfast and afternoon shows. In 2024 Evans returned to work with Sam Newman as an ad hoc guest speaker on the You Cannot Be Serious podcast.

== Later career ==
In 2007, Evans became a marriage celebrant, a role in which he continues to work. He also returned briefly to radio, hosting 3SR FM Shepparton's breakfast program from 2009 to 2012, before leaving to care for his aging mother. According to his own published website Greg Evans hosted the TV Week Logie Awards in 1985, where he was a three-time nominee for the Gold Logie.

== Charity and Community Work ==
Evans has been involved in several charitable endeavours, including serving as Chairman of the Variety Club of Australia (Victorian region). He is also an Australia Day lifetime ambassador.

== A Day for All Australians ==
On a well-known podcast, Evans elaborated on his proposal to redefine the celebration of Australia Day, advocating for a "neutral day" and a long weekend. He suggested that the holiday be observed on the third Saturday of January, a date free of historical or cultural associations. The third Saturday occurs on a date between 15 and 22 January. This, he argued, would allow all Australians, including Aboriginal Australians, Anglo-Saxons, Europeans, and Asians, to celebrate the nation's values and contributions in a way that resonates personally with them. Evans proposed an accompanying long weekend, beginning on the Friday preceding the third Saturday, rather than the traditional Monday. This adjustment, he believed, would foster unity and inclusivity while offering a modern and practical way to observe a national holiday. Greg Evans remains an influential figure in Australian media, known for his contributions to both radio and television and his enduring popularity as a marriage celebrant.

== TV & Radio work ==
- 3CS Colac Breakfast host (1971–1972)
- 3CV Maryborough afternoon announcer (1972)
- 2KA Katoomba Breakfast announcer
- 3XY Drive Host
- 3MP Morning Host
- Network Ten Together Tonight host (1982)
- Perfect Match Australia Host on Network Ten (1984–1986) (1989)
- Network Ten Star Search host (1985–1986)
- Nine Network Say G'Day host (1987)
- Nine Network Crossfire host (1987)
- 3XY Drive host (1978–1983)
- 3AW breakfast guest host with Sam Newman (1992)
- Gold 104.3 Drive host (1994–1996)
- Gold 104.3 Breakfast host with Dermott Brereton (1996–1998)
- Network Ten Monday To Friday host (1997)
- 3AK Mornings (1999)
- 3AK afternoon announcer (2001–2003)
- Nine Network Talking Real Estate host (2004)
- 3MP Drive host (2005)
- 3SR FM Shepparton breakfast host Solo (2009–2012) with Mandy Turner (2012–)
- Ad hoc guest speaker You Cannot Be Serious podcast with Sam Newman (2024-)

2KA Katoomba Breakfast announcer Greg also presented the Keno draw on GTV9 mainly week nights.
