= 3YB FM =

Coordinates: 38.3871°S 142.4852°E

- Warrnambool; Australia
- Broadcast area: South coast of Victoria
- Frequency: 94.5 MHz

Programming
- Language: English
- Format: 70's to current music, news, talk, sport

Ownership
- Owner: Ace Radio
- Sister stations: Coast FM

History
- Former frequencies: 882 kHz AM (1978–2018)
- Call sign meaning: 3: Victoria; Young of Ballarat (see History of broadcasting)

Links
- Website: 3yb.com.au

3YB FM is a radio broadcaster based in Warrnambool, Victoria, Australia. It transmits on the frequency modulation radio band, at a frequency of 94.5 MHz. The station is part of the Ace Radio FM network. It has an adult contemporary music format mixed with talk.

The station has one of the most unusual histories of any Australian radio station, having commenced broadcasting in 1931 as a mobile station, prior to permanently settling in Warrnambool in 1935.

== History ==
=== The 1930s: Mobile Station, and the move to Warrnambool ===
Between October 1931 and November 1935 3YB was a mobile station, broadcasting around Victoria in areas that did not yet have local stations. In 1931, the only stations in rural Victoria were: 3BA Ballarat, 3TR Trafalgar, 3GL Geelong, 3WR Wangaratta, and 3BO Bendigo. It broadcast first from a Ford car and Ford truck, and later from a railway carriage originally built for the 1899 Royal Train, and first used for the 1901 visit of Prince George, Duke of Cornwall and York, and the Duchess. 3YB's founder was Vic Dinenny, but the concept of the station had been the brainchild of Jack Young and his brother, from Ballarat, which was reflected in the call-sign, Young Brothers or, maybe, Ballarat.

The mobile station had a limited power of 25 watts, meaning that it could only be heard in a small regional area at any given time.

The mobile station would move into a selected town for three weeks, and the first week was occupied with setting up the station, particularly the broadcasting mast and other technical gear. Concurrently, visits were made to local businesses and advertising was sold, although Dinenny also secured a few national advertisers. During the second and third weeks, the station broadcast daily from 6.00 to 10.00 pm. The record library was divided into 14 complete programs, ensuring that there was no repetition of records during the two weeks that the station broadcast to an area. The first town to be visited, in October 1931, was Creswick.

There were Warrnambool links from the commencement of the station: radio pioneer Oscar V. Henry, technician and manager Harry S. Fuller, and salesperson Sid Kemp, were all involved when the station began mobile broadcasting.

As more rural stations opened in Victoria, the concept of a mobile station became less practical. Therefore, Dinenny applied for licences for two conventional, non-mobile stations, one in Warrnambool, and the other, 3UL, in Warragul.

The opening of the Warrnambool station, which retained the call sign 3YB, was due to take place on 27 December 1935 but, due to problems with the transmission tower, the opening was postponed to 8.00 pm on Saturday 18 January 1936.

=== Ownership ===
Within a few years of moving to Warrnambool, 3YB became part of the Argus Broadcasting Services network, along with 3UL Warragul and 3SR Shepparton. This Victorian rural radio network was operated by The Argus, then a daily newspaper. When The Argus closed in January 1957, their radio network evolved into the Associated Broadcasting Company which owned 3YB until it was sold to Regional Communications Pty Ltd in 1982, and then, in 1990 the station was purchased by two private shareholders. The current operators, Ace Radio Broadcasters purchased 3YB in 1995.

In the late 1980s/1990s and into the early 21st century, the Australian Broadcasting Tribunal embarked on a policy of increasing the number of regional radio stations, particularly on the FM band by inviting existing AM stations to start a second station, serving the same market. Some stations chose to start a brand new FM station, whilst others elected to move their existing station to the FM band, whilst also starting a new AM station on their former wavelength. 3YB fell into the former category, with its sister station, 3YFM (broadcasting as 95.3 Coast FM) commencing operations on 14 August 2002. However, as from 2 July 2018, 3YB has also broadcast on the FM band (see below).

=== Studios ===
The first 3YB studio in Warrnambool (and its first permanent studio) was at the property Wentworth on Weir Road. On 16 April 1945 there was a fire at the studio and transmitter complex at Wentworth, and 3YB was forced off the air for three weeks. On 5 May 1945 the station re-opened, broadcasting from new studios on the 1st floor of the T & G building on the corner of Leibig and Lava Streets. This studio served the station until August 1968 when new purpose-built studios were opened at 95 Timor Street.

=== Broadcasters ===
Many prominent broadcasters commenced their careers at 3YB. These include: Ron Cadee, Vern Haycroft, Denzil Howson, Rod Kilgour, Mike Menner, Barry Seeber, Rod Spargo, Michael Taft, and Mal Walden.

Long serving news presenter Lois Chislett has won a number of Australian Commercial Radio Awards for best news presenter for a country station including in 2012.

== Move to FM ==
On 2 July 2018, 882 3YB converted to the FM band by swapping frequencies with Vision Australia Radio's Warrnambool station. It is now known as 94.5 3YBFM.

== On-Air Schedule ==
=== Weekdays ===
- 12:00am–5:30am – Australia Overnight
- 5:30am–6:00am – Country Today
- 6:00am–8:30am – The Morning Rush with Sean Cullen and Matthew Monk
- 8:30am–12:00pm – Tom Elliott
- 12:00pm–1:00pm – 70's and 80's Lunchbox
- 1:00pm–6:00pm – Dave Drinkell
- 6:00pm–8:00pm – Sportsday
- 8:00pm–12:00am – Nights with Denis Walter

=== Saturdays ===
- 12:00am–5:00am – Australia Overnight
- 5:00am–6:00am – Gerard Whateley
- 6:00am–7:00am – Reel Adventures
- 7:00am–8:00am – The Centre Pass
- 8:00am–9:00am – Good, The Bad and the Ugly
- 9:00am–10:00am – The 3YB FM Racing Show
- 10:00am–12:00pm – Off The Bench
- 12:00pm–5:30pm – Hampden League Live
- 5:30pm–12:00am – AFL Nation

=== Sundays ===
- 12:00am–6:00am – Better Music and More of It
- 6:00am–9:00am – Sunday Country
- 9:00am–10:00am – Food Bytes
- 10:00am–12:00pm – Classic Hits Countdown
- 12:00pm–11:00pm – AFL Nation
- 11:00pm–12:00am – Great Australian Lives
