= Kevin Sheehan =

Australian rules footballer

Personal information
- Born: 1 August 1953 (age 73)
- Original team: Sandhurst
- Debut: Round 4, 1974, Geelong vs. St Kilda, at Kardinia Park
- Height: 177 cm (5 ft 10 in)
- Weight: 76 kg (168 lb)

Playing career^{1}
Years	Club	Games (Goals)
1974–1982	Geelong	102 (112)
- ^{1} Playing statistics correct to the end of 1982.

Kevin Vincent Sheehan OAM (born 1 August 1953) is a former Australian rules footballer for Geelong and the current Australian Football League (AFL) National Talent and International Manager, a member of the AFL football operations sub-committee and a selector for the AFL Rising Star award.

Sheehan played 102 games for Geelong over nine seasons, but only managed 16 senior games in his final three seasons. During this time, however, he won three consecutive reserve grade premierships, captaining the side in 1981.

After retiring as a player, Sheehan remained involved in the game, initially as the Victorian State of Origin team manager and then as the AFL national talent identification manager. He is honoured in this role by having the Kevin Sheehan Medal awarded to the best player in each year's Under 16 National Championships.

From 2010 onwards, Sheehan appeared as a panellist on TAC Cup Future Stars, a Nine Network television program.
