= 1242 AM =

AM radio frequency

The following radio stations broadcast on AM frequency 1242kHz.

== Australia ==
- 3GV at Traralgon, Victoria
- 4AK

== Indonesia ==
- RRI Pro-1 at Bogor, West Java

== Japan ==
- JOLF, master station at Tokyo.

== New Zealand ==
- 1XX at Whakatane

== Philippines ==
- DWBL at Mandaluyong
