= 1332 AM =

AM radio frequency

The following radio stations broadcast on AM frequency 1332 kHz:

== Australia ==
- 3SH in Swan Hill
- 4BU in Bundaberg

== Iran ==
- Radio Tehran in Tehran

== Japan ==
- Tokai Radio Broadcasting in Nagoya
