= Edge FM 102.5 =

Radio station in Victoria, Australia

Edge FM 102.5 (2MOR)
- Deniliquin, New South Wales; Australia
- Broadcast area: Northern Victoria & the Southern Riverina (Deniliquin RA1)
- Frequency: 102.5 MHz
- Branding: Music that Makes You Feel Good

Programming
- Format: Contemporary Hit Radio

Ownership
- Owner: ACE Radio; (Rich Rivers Radio Pty Ltd)
- Sister stations: 1521 2QN

History
- First air date: 16 April 1994
- Former names: Classic Rock 102.5 FM102.5 102.5 The Edge

Technical information
- Licensing authority: ACMA
- ERP: 50 kW
- Repeaters: Cobram (88.5 MHz, 100 w ERP); Echuca/Moama (103.9 MHz, 200 w ERP)

Links
- Public licence information: Profile
- Website: www.edge1025.com.au

Edge FM 102.5 is a commercial radio station broadcasting from Deniliquin, New South Wales, Australia.

It is currently owned by ACE Radio & broadcasts a Contemporary Hit Radio (CHR) format. It features locally produced content, network content from ACE Radio and content from Seven Media Group (formerly Southern Cross Austereo).

In 2017, Edge FM 102.5 (then branded as 102.5 The Edge) came under the ownership of ACE Radio as its parent company Rich Rivers Radio, along with Wangaratta based Edge FM 102.1 and 3NE (now Star FM 92.1) was acquired by ACE.

There are repeaters in Cobram (88.5 MHz) and Echuca (103.9 MHz).

== History ==
Formerly known as Classic Rock 102.5, in 2013 the station dropped its classic rock format, rebranding as FM102.5 and switching to pop music Easy Listening.

On 1 September 2015, the station rebranded as 102.5 The Edge, in line with Wangaratta sister station 102.1 The Edge (now Edge FM 102.1).

In 2017, 102.5 The Edge was purchased by Victorian broadcasters ACE Radio, converted to Edge FM 102.5 and now runs a Contemporary Hit Radio music format, targeting under 39's.
