= 3LK =

3LK may stand for:

- the 3Live Kru, a stable in Total Nonstop Action Wrestling
- 3LK, the former callsign of a radio station 3WM in Horsham, Victoria, Australia
