= Mixx FM 101.3 =

Mixx FM 101.3 (3WWM)
- Horsham, Victoria, Australia; Australia
- Broadcast area: Wimmera (Horsham RA1)
- Frequency: 101.3 MHz
- Branding: Music that Makes You Feel Good

Programming
- Format: Contemporary Hit Radio

Ownership
- Owner: Ace Radio
- Sister stations: 3WM

History
- First air date: 4 July 1996

Technical information
- ERP: 20 kW
- HAAT: 180 m
- Repeaters: 94.5 MHz – Nhill & Kaniva (2 kW ERP); 98.5 MHz – Ararat (1 kW ERP)

Links
- Website: www.mixx1013.com.au

Mixx FM 101.3 is a commercial radio station broadcasting from Horsham, Victoria, Australia. It is owned by Ace Radio and broadcasts a Contemporary Hit Radio (CHR) format. It features both locally produced content & nationally syndicated content from Seven Media Group (formerly Southern Cross Austereo). Repeaters are located in Nhill (94.5 MHz), and Ararat (98.5 MHz).
