= Mixx FM 88.9 =

Mixx FM 88.9 (3HFM)
- Hamilton, Victoria; Australia
- Broadcast area: Western District (Hamilton RA1)
- Frequency: 88.9 MHz
- Branding: "Music that makes you Feel Good"

Programming
- Format: Contemporary Hit Radio

Ownership
- Owner: Ace Radio; (Ace Radio Broadcasters Pty Ltd)
- Sister stations: 3HA/3HA FM

History
- First air date: August 1, 2002
- Call sign meaning: 3HFM "Hamilton Frequency Modulation"

Technical information
- Licensing authority: ACMA
- ERP: 20 kW
- HAAT: 30 m
- Transmitter coordinates: 37.683381°S 142.019842°E
- Repeaters: 93.7 MHz (Portland, 5 kW ERP)

Links
- Public licence information: Profile
- Website: mixx889.com.au

Mixx FM 88.9 is a commercial radio station broadcasting from Hamilton, Victoria, Australia.

Mixx FM went live on 1 August 2002, with the licence granted by the Australian Communications & Media Authority (ACMA) on the 27th of July 2002.

It was established and is currently owned by Ace Radio. The station broadcasts a Contemporary Hit Radio (CHR) music format, targeting an 18-39 year old audience.

Mixx FM 88.9 features both locally produced content from their Brown Street, Hamilton studios & nationally syndicated content from Seven Media Group (formerly Southern Cross Austereo).

In 2003 a repeater was established on 93.7 MHz in Portland. This repeater originally broadcast with 2 kW ERP, but this was increased to 5 kW in 2026 along with 3HA's FM repeater on 92.9 MHz to increase the coverage reliability in the hilly terrain surrounding Portland and Heywood.
