= Boorhaman =

- Town
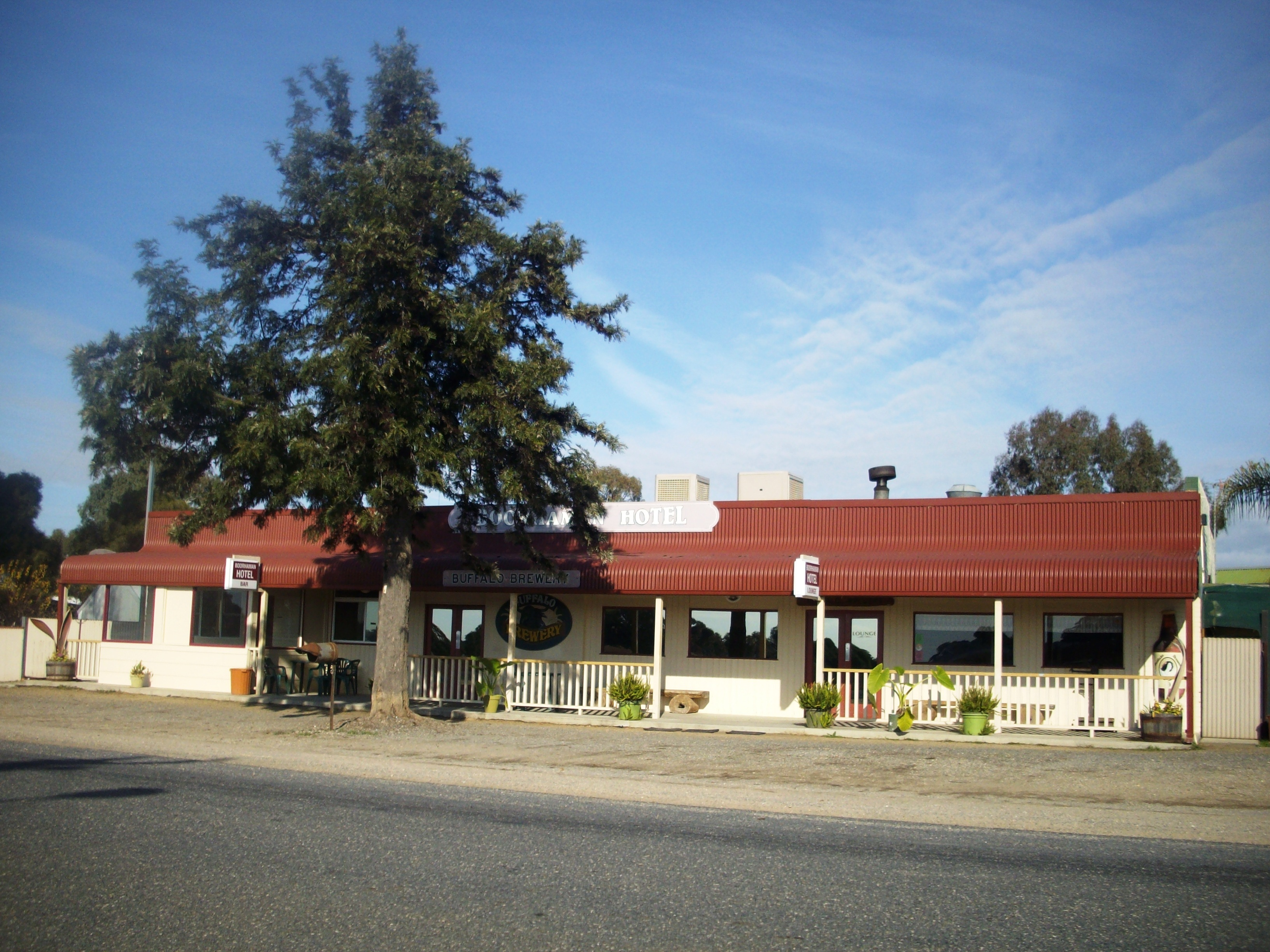
- Boorhaman Hotel

- Coordinates: 36°12′S 146°17′E
- Country: Australia
- State: Victoria
- Region: Hume
- LGA: Rural City of Wangaratta
- Location: 272 km (169 mi) NE of Melbourne; 19 km (12 mi) N of Wangaratta

Government
  - State electorate: Wangaratta
  - Federal division: Indi

Population
  - Total: 126 (2016 census)
- Postcode: 3678

Boorhaman is a locality in north east Victoria, Australia. The locality is in the Rural City of Wangaratta, 272 kilometres (169 mi) north east of the state capital, Melbourne. At the 2016 census, Boorhaman had a population of 126. There is a state forest near Boorhaman on the Ovens River plain.
