= 104.1 Territory FM =

Territory FM 104.1 (8TFM)
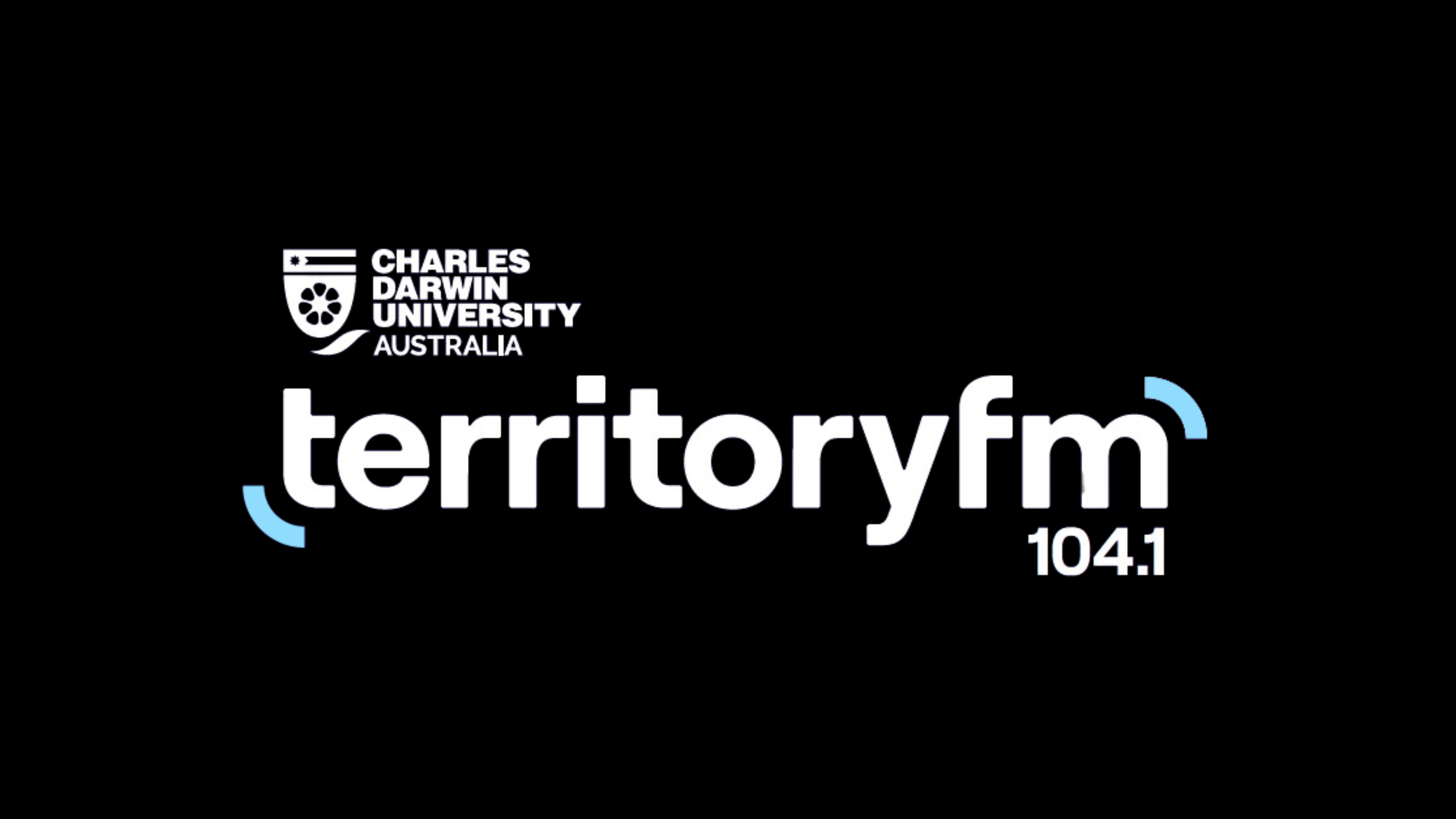
- Darwin, Northern Territory; Australia
- Frequency: 104.1 MHz

Programming
- Language: English
- Format: Full-service
- Affiliations: Nine News

Ownership
- Owner: Charles Darwin University

History
- First air date: 5 June 1981

Technical information
- Licensing authority: ACMA
- Transmitter coordinates: 12.37395°S 130.867649°E
- Repeaters: 96.9 Lake Bennett; 98.7 Alice Springs; 98.5 Batchelor; 99.7 Adelaide River; 104.1 Jabiru; 106.9 Gove (currently repeaters n/a)

Links
- Public licence information: Profile
- Webcast: Online Stream
- Website: www.territoryfm.com

Territory FM is a community radio station based in Darwin, Australia. Territory FM broadcasts a broad range of adult contemporary rock and mainstream music from the Darwin City campus of Charles Darwin University. News is provided by Nine News between 6:00am and 10:00pm. Territory FM also has a long-standing media agreement with the Nine Network, broadcasting Nine News Darwin bulletins every weeknight, as well as updates from their newsroom in the afternoons.

The station is broadcast on 104.1 FM in Darwin, Palmerston, and the surrounding areas. In 2016 Territory FM began broadcasting on the DAB+ platform with help from Community Radio Australia.

Current 2024 presenters include Greg Vincent, Steve Hooper, Matt Bern, Alice Cooper and Audrey Perets.

Territory FM broadcast from the Casuarina Campus of CDU from 1981 to 2024. As of September 2024 Territory FM has built new digital studio's at CDU's City Campus.

The station was originally called "8TOPFM" for most of the 1980s and "104.1 TOPFM" in the 1990s. By the 2000s "TOP" was renamed "Territory FM 104.1"

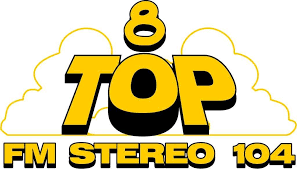
Top FM logo 1981

In 2016 the book Blazing A Trail on Darwin Airwaves – the first 35 years of FM 104.1 Darwin (1981–2016) was released, which documents Darwin's first community radio station and its history. Its introduction was written by long-time presenter Jih Seymour.

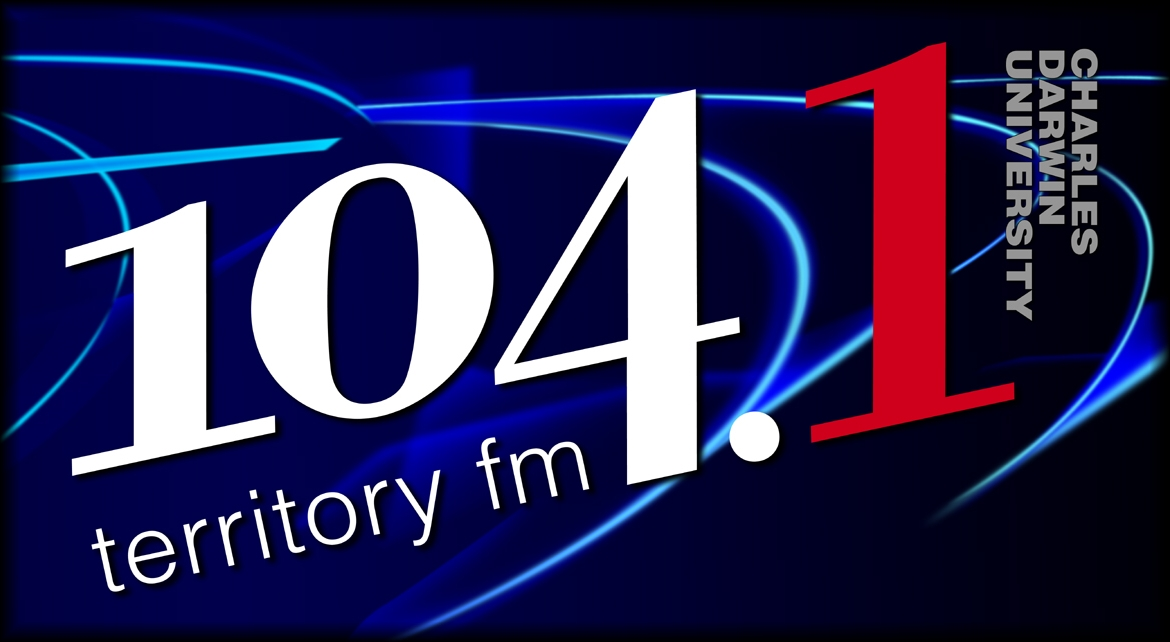
Territory FM logo 2006

== Listenership ==
The 2008 survey commissioned by Roy Morgan Research showed that 23% of Darwin and Palmerston residents listen to Territory FM. Territory FM is the most listened-to station in Darwin between 12:00pm and 6:00pm with 27% of Territory FM listeners aged between 35 and 54 years of age.

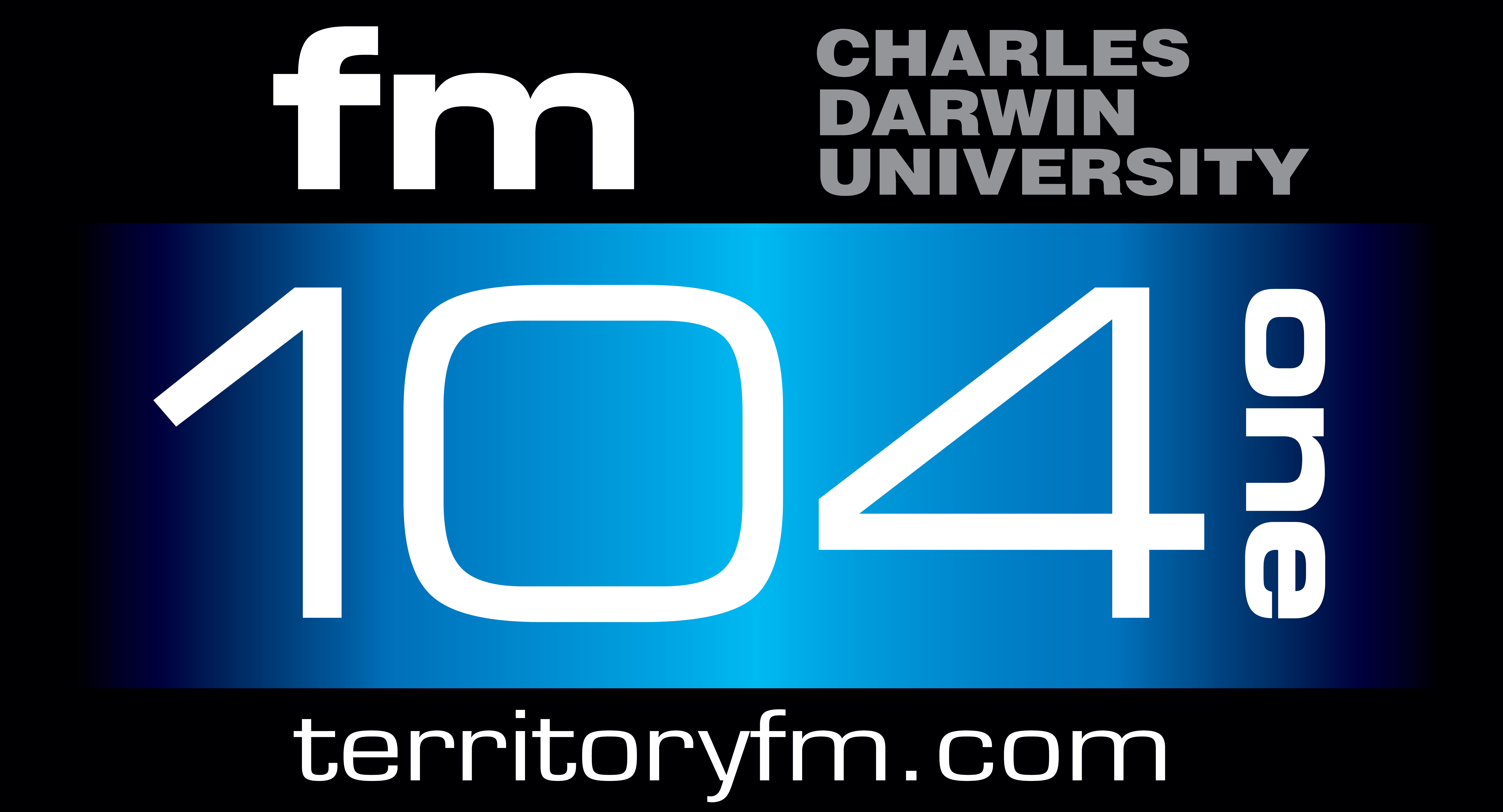
Territory FM logo 2010-2024

The 2016 survey commissioned by Roy Morgan showed that Territory FM had a reach of 51% all people and is Darwin's most listened to radio stations, especially during the mornings and afternoon drive timeslots. Weekend listening is extremely strong with programs such as the Acoustic Storm, Alice Cooper, Cultural Village and Saturday Night Rock.

In 2023 2 of Territory FM's radio shows won nationally recognised community radio awards (CBAA awards). Matt Bern won "Best Music Show" for Drive and "Best Australian Music Show" for Fresh Mint (Local Music). It was the first time in decades that TFM entered this awards.
