= TRFM =

TRFM (3TFM)
- Traralgon, Victoria; Australia
- Broadcast area: Latrobe Valley & East Gippsland
- Frequency: 99.5 MHz (Mount Tassie)

Programming
- Language: English
- Format: Contemporary hit radio

Ownership
- Owner: Ace Radio
- Sister stations: Gold1242 & Gold FM 98.3

History
- First air date: 1930
- Former call signs: 3TR
- Former names: 3TR FM (2002–2008)
- Former frequencies: 1280 kHz (1930–1935); 1240 kHz (1935–1978); 1242 kHz (1978–2002)
- Call sign meaning: 3 for Victoria + TFM for Traralgon FM

Technical information
- Licensing authority: ACMA
- Repeater: 99.9 MHz (Mount Taylor)

Links
- Public licence information: Profile
- Website: www.trfm.com.au

TRFM (Callsign: 3TFM) is a commercial radio station broadcasting from Traralgon, Victoria, Australia. It is currently owned by Ace Radio and broadcasts a contemporary hit radio format. It features both locally produced content & nationally syndicated content from Seven Media Group (formerly Southern Cross Austereo). It has a repeater on Mount Taylor, near Bairnsdale, to better cover East Gippsland.

== History ==
The station began life in Trafalgar as 3TR, being an abbreviation for 3 Trafalgar Radio. It has since moved studio locations several times and has been based in Trafalgar, Sale, and Traralgon. The station was founded by Frank Berkery, and later from 1934 to 1938 was owned by Archibald Gilchrist.

The original 3TR studios in Sale are now used by ABC Gippsland. These studios were officially opened by then Prime Minister Robert Menzies on Saturday 29 April 1939 and the program was then relayed across the Victorian Broadcast Network (made up of 3SH and 3HA at the time) to which it then belonged.

For most of the station's life it operated on the AM band, most recently at 1242 kHz. On Friday 26 April 2002 at midday the station officially became 3TR FM. For the previous week it was simulcasting on both AM and FM after test transmissions. Also at midday, sister station 3GV (now known as Gold 1242) commenced on 1242 kHz.

In other markets where Ace Radio have set up supplementary FM stations they have launched a new FM station (generally under the Mixx FM brand) and kept the existing AM station broadcasting as usual with its existing name. However it was decided to transfer the 3TR brand name to FM in an attempt to retain 3TR's existing listener base and instead start a new station on 1242 kHz. Also the format of 1242 3TR in the years prior to the transfer to FM was very similar to the format 3TR FM carried making more sense to keep the 3TR brand name on the new FM station.

In September 2008 the station dropped the "3" from its name and is now known as TRFM.
