= Gold1242 & Gold FM 98.3 =

Gippsland's GOLD
- Traralgon, Victoria; Australia
- Broadcast area: Latrobe Valley & East Gippsland
- Frequency: 1242 kHz
- Branding: Gippsland's GOLD FM 98.3 & 1242 AM

Programming
- Language: English
- Format: Classic hits and talkback

Ownership
- Owner: Ace Radio
- Sister stations: TRFM

History
- First air date: 26 April 2002; 24 years ago
- Call sign meaning: 3 – Victoria; GV – Gippsland (Latrobe) Valley

Technical information
- Repeater: 98.3 MHz (Mt Taylor)

Links
- Website: 1242.com.au

Gippsland's GOLD 1242 & GOLD FM 98.3 (call sign: 3GV) is an Australian radio station operating west of Traralgon, Victoria. It is owned by Ace Radio and shares studios with sister station TRFM, formerly 3TR and 3TRFM. The station broadcasts on the frequency of 1242 kHz from a transmitter in Myrtlebank (near Sale) on the Maffra-Sale road. Its signal covers the Latrobe Valley and East Gippsland.

It commenced broadcasting on 26 April 2002 branded as 3GV. Previously sister station 3TR had occupied the 1242 kHz frequency but moved to FM when Ace Radio was given a section 39 supplementary FM license for the Sale RA1 licence area. Gippsland was one of the last regions in Australia to have a section 39 FM license and so up until 2002 had no commercial FM service.

Some programming previously broadcast on 3TR stayed on 3GV, notably AFL football coverage relayed from 3AW. AFL football was heard on FM in Gippsland only once while 3TR was simulcasting on FM and AM the day before both station's official launch in 2002 on Anzac Day (25 April 2002). As of 2010 the station along with the rest of the Ace Radio network now carries AFL Nation instead of 3AW's AFL coverage.

In 2016, the station rebranded as Gippsland's 1242, with more programming taken from 3AW (similar to other ACE Radio stations). It soon reverted to its former branding of GOLD 1242. In 2017 they added an FM repeater from Mount Taylor (alongside the TRFM repeater) on 98.3 to better cover Bairnsdale & East Gippsland.
