= Future Stars =

- Genre: Talk; Sports
- Presented by: Craig Hutchison (2009 - 2014); Nathan Brown (2015 - 2018)
- Country of origin: Australia
- Original language: English
- No. of seasons: 8

Production
- Executive producer: Julian Bayard
- Producer: Mitch Cleary
- Production locations: Melbourne, Victoria
- Running time: 60 minutes
- Production company: Crocmedia

Original release
- Network: Nine Network
- Release: 10 May 2009 – 23 September 2018

Future Stars (formerly TAC Cup Future Stars) was an Australian sports television program which focused on the TAC Cup, under-18 Australian rules football competitions and young prospects of the AFL. It premiered on Sunday 10 May 2009, and featured game highlights, interviews and analysis of the top prospects to be nominated in the AFL draft.
