= Coast FM 95.3 =

Coast FM 95.3 (3YFM)
- Warrnambool, Victoria; Australia
- Broadcast area: The Great South Coast (Warrnambool RA1)
- Frequency: 95.3 MHz

Programming
- Language: English
- Format: Contemporary hit radio

Ownership
- Owner: Ace Radio; (Regional Communications Pty Ltd)
- Sister stations: 3YB FM 94.5

History
- First air date: 27 July 2002

Technical information
- Licensing authority: ACMA
- ERP: 20 kW
- HAAT: 23 m

Links
- Public licence information: Profile
- Website: www.coast.com.au

Coast FM 95.3 is a commercial radio station broadcasting from Warrnambool, Victoria, Australia. It is currently owned by Ace Radio and broadcasts A Contemporary Hit Radio (CHR) format.

It features both locally produced content & nationally syndicated content from Seven Media Group (formerly Southern Cross Austereo).
