= Star FM 92.1 =

Coordinates: 36.353715°S 146.324937°E

Star FM 92.1 (3NE)
- Wangaratta, Victoria; Australia
- Broadcast area: North East & Border
- Frequency: 92.1 MHz

Programming
- Format: Adult Contemporary

Ownership
- Owner: Ace Radio
- Sister stations: Edge FM 102.1

History
- First air date: 27 March 1954 (as 3NE); 30 June 2025 (as Star 92.1)
- Former frequencies: 1566 kHz (November 1978 – 27 July 2025); 1600 kHz (?-November 1978); 105.3 MHz (Mount Buffalo repeater, 1992–?); 102.1 MHz (Mount Beauty repeater, 1994–1996)
- Call sign meaning: "N"orth "E" ast Victoria

Technical information
- ERP: 25 kW
- HAAT: 45m
- Transmitter coordinates: -36.384372°,146.205317°
- Repeaters: 89.3 MHz Mount Hotham; 90.1 MHz Mount Beauty; 90.1 MHz Myrtleford; 99.1 MHz Mount Buffalo

Links
- Website: www.star921.com.au

Star FM 92.1 is an Australian Adult Contemporary-formatted FM radio station, broadcasting from Wangaratta, Victoria to the surrounding areas of North East Victoria and parts of Southern New South Wales.

Star FM 92.1 began as 3NE, and was opened on 27 March 1954.

As of 1 November 2017 the station is owned and operated by Ace Radio, which acquired it and sister station Edge FM 102.1 from North East Broadcasters.

On 30 June 2025, 3NE relaunched on 92.1 FM as part of the ACMA's AM-FM conversion program, becoming Star FM and adopting a full-time Adult Contemporary music-based format.

The 1566 kHz AM frequency simulcasted the Star FM 92.1 broadcast from Star FM's launch on 30 June 2025.

The 1566 kHz signal was turned off at approximately 11:59 PM on 27 July 2025, ending over 70 years of "3NE" branding in the region.

The switch to Star FM 92.1 meant the end of syndicated Tapt Media talkback broadcasting (along with the end of the Tom Elliott show on 3NE), and a switch full-time to the Adult Contemporary music format, targeting the 35+ audience.

This left local residents with 2AY as their main option for talkback, the signal of which can be fortuitous in certain parts of the Wangaratta RA1.

While some older residents were noted as being displeased with the change, the first survey as Star FM 92.1 in 2026 showed a positive uptick in ratings compared to it's performance in 2023 as 3NE on 1566 kHz.

== On-Air Schedule ==
=== Weekdays ===
- 12:00am–6:00am – Star Overnight
- 5:30am –6:00am - Country Today with Libby Price
- 6:00am –10:00am - Matt Hobbs
- 10:00pm–2:00pm – Karen Prater
- 2:00pm– 6:00pm - Nathan Robb
- 6:00pm–12:00pm – Star Nights

=== Saturdays ===
- 12:00am–6:00am – Star Overnight
- 6:00am–12:00pm – Matt Hobbs
- 12:00pm–6:00pm - Star Weekends
- 6:00pm–12:00am – Flock of 80's

=== Sundays ===
- 12:00am–6:00am – Star Overnight
- 6:00am–12:00pm – Nathan Robb
- 12:00pm–12:00am -Star Weekends
