= Edge FM 102.1 =

Coordinates: 36.4512°S 146.8030°E

Edge FM 102.1 (3NNN)
- Wangaratta, Victoria; Australia
- Broadcast area: Wangaratta RA1
- Frequency: 102.1 MHz
- Branding: Music that Makes You Feel Good

Programming
- Format: Contemporary Hit Radio

Ownership
- Owner: ACE Radio; (North East Broadcasters Pty Ltd)
- Sister stations: Star FM 92.1

History
- First air date: 18 November 1996

Technical information
- Licensing authority: ACMA
- ERP: 25 kW
- HAAT: 40 m
- Repeaters: Mount Beauty (93.3 MHz, 10 watts); Bright (93.7 MHz, 50 watts)

Links
- Public licence information: Profile
- Website: edge1021.com.au

Edge FM 102.1 is a commercial radio station broadcasting from Wangaratta, Victoria, Australia. It is currently owned by Ace Radio & broadcasts a Contemporary Hit Radio (CHR) format. It features both locally produced content & content from Seven Media Group (formerly Southern Cross Austereo).

There is a repeater at Mount Beauty (93.3FM).

In 2017 Edge FM 102.1 (then branded as 102.1 The Edge) came under the ownership of Ace Radio as its parent company North East Broadcasters was acquired by ACE, as well as Deniliquin based Edge FM 102.5 & 1521 2QN.
