= 3CS =

Australian radio station

Australia
- Broadcast area: Colac, Camperdown & various other areas
- Frequency: 1134 kHz AM
- Branding: 1134 3CS

Programming
- Format: Adult contemporary

Ownership
- Owner: Ace Radio

History
- First air date: 9 October 1939
- Call sign meaning: 3 = VIC 'CS' – Colac & South West

Technical information
- Class: Commercial
- Power: 5 KW
- Transmitter coordinates: 38.3236°S 143.5347°E

Links
- Website: www.3cs.com.au

3CS is a radio station broadcasting in the South-West Victoria region, but based in Colac. The station is aimed at the 35–60 year old demographic, and its format is based on classic hits, talk, sports and news. It broadcasts local content between 1 and 6 pm, while all other programs come from 3AW or 2GB, except "The Morning Rush" which is broadcast across ACE Radio's heritage network.

== Beginnings ==
There had been occasional discussion about the viability of having a locally based radio station in the area, but nothing had ever eventuated. A Melbourne radio station executive, M. B. Duffy, became aware, through his involvement with 3KZ, that radio reception in the Colac-Otway area was generally very poor. Duffy took the initiative and went to Colac in an effort to interest local businessmen in his proposal to establish a radio station in the area.

He was fortunate in finding some enthusiastic backers from within the town and, in 1938, they joined forces to form the Colac Broadcasting Company Pty Ltd.

The most vital requirement in the preparatory stage was the granting of the all-important licence to broadcast, which was obtained on 27 January 1939. The need for a studio was quickly filled by director Malcolm Wallace, who undertook to provide a suitable site. The property at 241 Murray Street (where the station still stands) was selected, and construction work was soon under way.

== Opening night ==
A large representation of local dignitaries arrived at the new station building for the 8 pm opening of 3CS. Attendance was by invitation and the guest list read like a "Who's Who" of the Colac district. Local MLC Mr J. P. Jones; the Colac Shire President, Cr J. Miller; councillors L. Bayer, G. Howey and A. Bilson and the Town Clerk Mr A. N. Walls were all included in the official party. Appropriately, the Mayor of Colac at this time was Cr. Walter Selwood, the chairman of directors of the Colac Broadcasting Company.

Cr Selwood invited the local Federal Member, the Hon. G. A. Street, Minister for Defence to open the station. Receiving an enthusiastic reception from the crowd, Street thanked the directors for their invitation to perform the happy duty. Referring to the recently declared outbreak of World War II, he said it helped him forget, at least for a short time, some of the worries that now confronted him.

Referring to 3CS, Street remarked on the efforts of those who had been behind establishing the station: "That showed there was a fine spirit of enterprise in the community, which was prepared to stand behind something new in the district", and he thought the broadcasting station would be a tremendous benefit. In officially declaring the station open, he "wished it every success and that the standard maintained, would be one of which the district would be proud.".

With radio station 3CS officially on the air, the Revellers orchestra struck up, and an evening of varied entertainment launched the station for guests and listeners alike.

== Early broadcasts ==
Transmission commenced at 6.30 am and continued until the station closed down at 9.30 am each day. A further session would be held between noon and 4.00 pm, with another break off air until 5.30 pm. The station closed down at 10.30 pm on weeknights, but continued until midnight on Saturdays. Provision was made to extend the times if necessary, to cover special functions. On Sundays, 3CS did not commence broadcasting until 11.00am. The first session lasted to 2.00pm, with the evening program running from 5.30 pm to 10.30 pm.

== Audience ==
The number of listeners to 3CS, as of 2018:

Breakfast (5:30 am to 9 am): 7,700
Mornings (9 am to noon): 6,300
Afternoon (12 pm to 4 pm): 4,300
Drive home (4 pm to 7 pm): 4,100
Evening (7 pm to midnight): 1,100
Weekend (Saturday to Sunday, 5:30 am to midnight): 6,100

== Staff ==
3CS has had hundreds of on-air staff since it opened in 1939. Some of the best-known names include Greg Evans (3XY and TV presenter), Sandy Roberts (TV sports broadcaster), Jim Ball (aka Jim Stewart: long-time Sydney radio presenter) and Peter Gee (ABC TV news presenter). Other staff alumni include names such as Vern Haycroft, Bill Bowie, Barry Browne, Peter Mobbs, Lance White (winner of the 2018 ACRA for best country news presenter), Warren Riches, John Busfield, Garry Beattie (Winner of the CMA International Broadcaster Of The Year Award, 2001), Geoff Peel, Paul "Jock" Brady, Jan Howarth, Jack Rann, Don Dwyer, Daryl Reader, Dan Lonergan, Danny Jumpertz, Ken Bell, Daryl McLean, Bev Parry, Craig Christie, Duncan Potts, Jenny Black, Rod Anderson, Colin Rowley, Dean Pickering, Eric Gracie, Mark Brunger.
