= 3WM =

Australian radio station in Horsham

Coordinates: 36.7248°S 142.2043°E

3WM is a radio station based in Horsham in the Wimmera Mallee region of Victoria, Australia. It broadcasts on the AM band, at a frequency of 1089 kHz, and on the FM band around Ararat at a frequency of 96.1 MHz and Nhill on 92.9 MHz.

More recently it moved its Horsham FM service to Dooen on the site of 3WV from Mt Zero, and is transmitting from aerials mounted on the 500 foot AM tower using an iso coupling device. Sharing the antenna with ABC News Radio.

The station is part of the Ace Radio network.

== History ==
The station opened on 11 September 1933 as 3HS Horsham. On 16 May 1936 the station was taken over by 3DB a subsidiary of The Herald and Weekly Times, Melbourne. Then, on 24 December 1936, the call sign was changed to 3LK and, at this time, the Horsham studios and transmitter were closed with the transmitter being relocated to the small village of Lubeck, hence the 3LK call sign. (Lubeck currently has a population of about 140, but it would have been bigger when a few 3LK technicians lived there with their families and, importantly, when Lubeck was a railway junction for the branch line to Rupanyup).

3LK did not have a local Wimmera studio, and the vast majority of its programming was relayed from 3DB. There was, however, about one or two hours per day of local programming, which came from the 3LK studio in the 3DB Melbourne building, utilising 3DB announcing staff. 3LK supported numerous local Wimmera/Mallee events and charities.

The slogan used for all 3DB/3LK programming during most of this era was: 3DB Melbourne, 3LK Central Victoria, the Herald-Sun stations, but towards the end of the DB/LK partnership this was modified to the more logical: 3DB Melbourne, 3LK Wimmera Mallee, the Herald-Sun stations.

In 1970 plans were made to locate the studio into Horsham and technicians came from HWT Ch 7 with new AWA consoles and landline equipment. Chief Engineer Harold Boast retired, Neil Marks became technician in charge, with Jim Wilson at Lubeck on shift, Steve Gregory studio rebuilding, Geoff Chisolm was hired to assist in the station cutting over to local programming. Les Bradley was manager, Joy Cosh secretary, David Rathman Studio manager, Ian Searl announcer, Chris O Sullivan announcer who later died of cancer. The studio which was installed in Horsham was connected by landline to Lubeck over some great distance via Murtoa. Callsign was changed to 3WM Wimmera Mallee Bright in the Middle of your dial. Les Bradley was manager, Chris O'Sullivan the morning announcer. Geoff Chisolm, a sound engineer from the UK was passing through Horsham and ended up being hired as a broadcast technician eventually becoming station manager and then opening his own business Chisholm HiFi. Becoming involved in the local community again, 3WM brought a fully equipped mobile studio from 3DB and used it to Broadcast from local venues including shows and sporting events. The caravan was towed by a Holden Wagon and was very heavy to tow. It was divided into a studio and control room. Outside Broadcasts began for the hospital and charities in the district including the Boort Festival. The station was not yet 24 hours and played the National Anthem by record from the Lubeck transmitter site. Equipment was all valve with AWA BTM5 running 2000 watts to a Marconi Tee high impedance antenna suspended between two 150 foot aluminium poles. 3WM eventually increased power to 5000 watts and moved to a new site south of Lubeck.

In July 2022 the station began broadcasting on 96.1 MHz on the FM band in the Ararat district.

== Current Programming ==
Currently, 3WM takes much of its programming from 3AW Melbourne.

3WM's sister station, also a member of the Ace Radio network, is Mixx FM Wimmera Mallee. Mixx FM broadcasts on three different channels from transmitters placed in geographically diverse parts of the Wimmera Mallee: 101.3 MHz from Horsham, 94.5 MHz from Lawloit (near Nhill) and 98.5 MHz from Ararat.

== See also ==
- 3DB (Melbourne)
