= 2QN =

Deniliquin, New South Wales; Australia
- Broadcast area: Deniliquin RA1
- Frequency: 1521 kHz
- Branding: News, Talk & Only The Hits You Love – 1521 2QN

Programming
- Language: English
- Format: Music, talk, news

Ownership
- Owner: ACE Radio
- Sister stations: Edge FM 102.5

History
- First air date: November 1935
- Former frequencies: 1440 kHz - 1520 kHz
- Call sign meaning: 2QN – DeniliQuiN

Technical information
- Power: 2,000 watts
- HAAT: 102 m
- Repeater: 102.9 MHz Echuca/Moama - 106.1 MHz Deniliquin

Links
- Website: 2qn.com.au

2QN is a radio station based in Deniliquin, New South Wales, Australia. It broadcasts on the medium wave radio band, at a frequency of 1521 kHz.

2QN combines a Classic Hits music format with talk radio, news broadcasting and a heavy emphasis on sports broadcasting both locally, and with syndicated sports programming from SEN.

The station's former breakfast announcer, Paul "Dixy" Dix, was the longest serving breakfast announcer in Australia at the one station. He had over 50 years experience in radio and had been in Deniliquin since 1961. Paul died in 2013. He is survived by his wife, Margaret Dix who is still alive as of March 2024 and living in Deniliquin.

The station is located in George Street, Deniliquin, in a purpose-built building.

== History ==
2QN originally started as 2DN in 1934 to broadcast at the Deniliquin Show. In November 1935, 2DN changed callsign to 2QN. It started with a capital of £3000, and 7 investors put their money into the fledgling new station.

The station originally started on 1440kHz, sharing frequencies with 4IP in Ipswich. Running at 50 watts, the station upped that power to 200 watts in 1936.

The studios were destroyed by fire in 1939, however the station was only off air for 6 days with 2QN being bought back on air with equipment borrowed from Swan Hill. Broadcasts were conducted from the School of Arts.

In the mid-1940s the station was under threat of being relocated to Wangaratta, which caused protests in Deniliquin. In 1952, the station increased its operating power from 200W to 2000W, along with a change in frequency to 1520 kHz.

Australia adopted the Geneva Frequency Plan of 1975 in 1978, and 2QN changed frequencies from 1520kHz to 1521kHz to comply.

2QN’s transmission tower was toppled in 2009, after consistent high winds in the region snapped the guy wires. The tower has been rebuilt, and is still in operation on 1521kHz.

In 2022, 2QN FM came on air on 102.9 FM, providing a stereo FM simulcast of 2QN’s programming to the border towns of Echuca and Moama.

On the 29th of March 2024, Murray Live, the official broadcast of Murray Football & Netball League games has switched to 2QN from its former home on sister station Edge FM 102.5. Games are broadcast every Saturday from 1 till 5PM during the season.

== Main programs ==
- Morning Rush with Sean, Monkey & Niamh
- Mornings on 2QN with Tom Elliott
- Country Today – Rural News and interviews with Libby Price
- Afternoons with Ange
- Sportsday
- Nights with Denis Walter
- Murray Live - Murray Football & Netball League game commentary
