= Triple M Goulburn Valley =

Radio station in Shepparton, Victoria, Australia

Coordinates: 36.3625°S 145.696°E

Triple M Goulburn Valley (3SRR)
Shepparton, Victoria; Australia
- Broadcast area: Goulburn Valley
- Frequencies: 95.3 MHz (Shepparton); 91.3 MHz (Mansfield, 350 watts ERP)

Programming
- Format: Adult contemporary

Ownership
- Owner: Southern Cross Austereo; (Goulburn and Border Broadcasters Pty Ltd)
- Sister stations: Hit Goulburn Valley

History
- First air date: 9 October 1998
- Former names: 3SR FM (1998–2016)
- Call sign meaning: 3 for Victoria plus Shepparton Radio Regional (station was the successor to 3SR on AM)

Technical information
- Licensing authority: Australian Communications and Media Authority
- ERP: 100,000 watts

Links
- Public licence information: Profile
- Website: www.triplem.com.au/goulburnvalley

Triple M Goulburn Valley is a commercial radio service broadcasting to the Goulburn Valley region of Victoria, Australia. The station originates from Shepparton and is broadcast on 95.3 MHz in Shepparton and 91.3 MHz in Mansfield. providing coverage across the wider region. It is owned by Southern Cross Austereo and broadcasts an adult contemporary (AC) format, featuring a mix of locally produced programming and nationally syndicated content.

The service commenced broadcasting in 1998 as 3SR FM, before being rebranded as Triple M in December 2016 as part of a network-wide rebrand by Southern Cross Austereo.

== History ==
The Goulburn Valley's 95.3 Triple M began life as 3WR, Wangaratta, first broadcasting on 1 December 1924. Its initial owner was the Wangaratta Sports Depot. 3WR was Australia's first non-capital city radio station. However, it closed as early as 22 December 1925, only to reopen under new management on 5 January 1931. 3WR moved its studios, transmitter and offices from Wangaratta to Shepparton on 15 January 1935. The name was changed to 3SR in January 1936. Unlike other stations, 3SR, from which 3SR FM derives its name, did not convert to the FM band. Instead, the original station was sold in return for a separate FM licence. Today, 3SR broadcasts as a relay of Melbourne sportstalk station 1116 SEN.

== Programming ==
Triple M Goulburn Valley airs a locally produced breakfast show from its Shepparton studio, featuring music, talk, and local news, weather, and traffic updates for the Goulburn Valley region. For the remainder of the day, programming is networked from Triple M’s metropolitan and state-wide feeds, including nationally syndicated music and talk shows broadcast across the Triple M network.
