= 3SH =

Swan Hill, Victoria; Australia
- Broadcast area: Swan Hill RA1
- Frequency: AM: 1332 kHz
- Branding: 1332 3SH

Programming
- Language: English
- Format: Classic hits, Talk radio

Ownership
- Owner: ACE Radio; (ACE Radio Broadcasters Pty Ltd)
- Sister stations: Mixx FM 107.7

History
- First air date: 27 August 1931
- Call sign meaning: 3 for Victoria plus Swan Hill

Technical information
- Licensing authority: ACMA
- Power: 2000 W
- Transmitter coordinates: 35.408369°S 143.581935°E

Links
- Public licence information: Profile
- Website: www.3sh.com.au

3SH is a commercial radio station in Swan Hill, Victoria, Australia broadcasting on the medium wave band on a frequency of 1332kHz. It was opened on 27 August 1931.

It is owned by Ace Radio.
