= 2AY =

Albury, New South Wales; Australia
- Broadcast area: Albury RA1
- Frequency: AM: 1494 kHz
- Branding: 1494 2AY

Programming
- Language: English
- Format: Classic hits Talk radio

Ownership
- Owner: Ace Radio; (Ace Radio Broadcasters Pty Ltd)

History
- First air date: 17 December 1930; 95 years ago
- Former frequencies: 1110 kHz AM (1930–1935); 1480 kHz AM (1935–1978)
- Call sign meaning: 2 – New South Wales; AlburY

Technical information
- Power: 2,000 watts
- Transmitter coordinates: 36°3′16″S 146°57′53″E

Links
- Website: 2ay.com.au

2AY is an Australian classic hits and talk radio formatted AM radio station, broadcasting to Albury, New South Wales and the surrounding areas of South West New South Wales and North East Victoria. It is owned and operated by Ace Radio.

== History ==
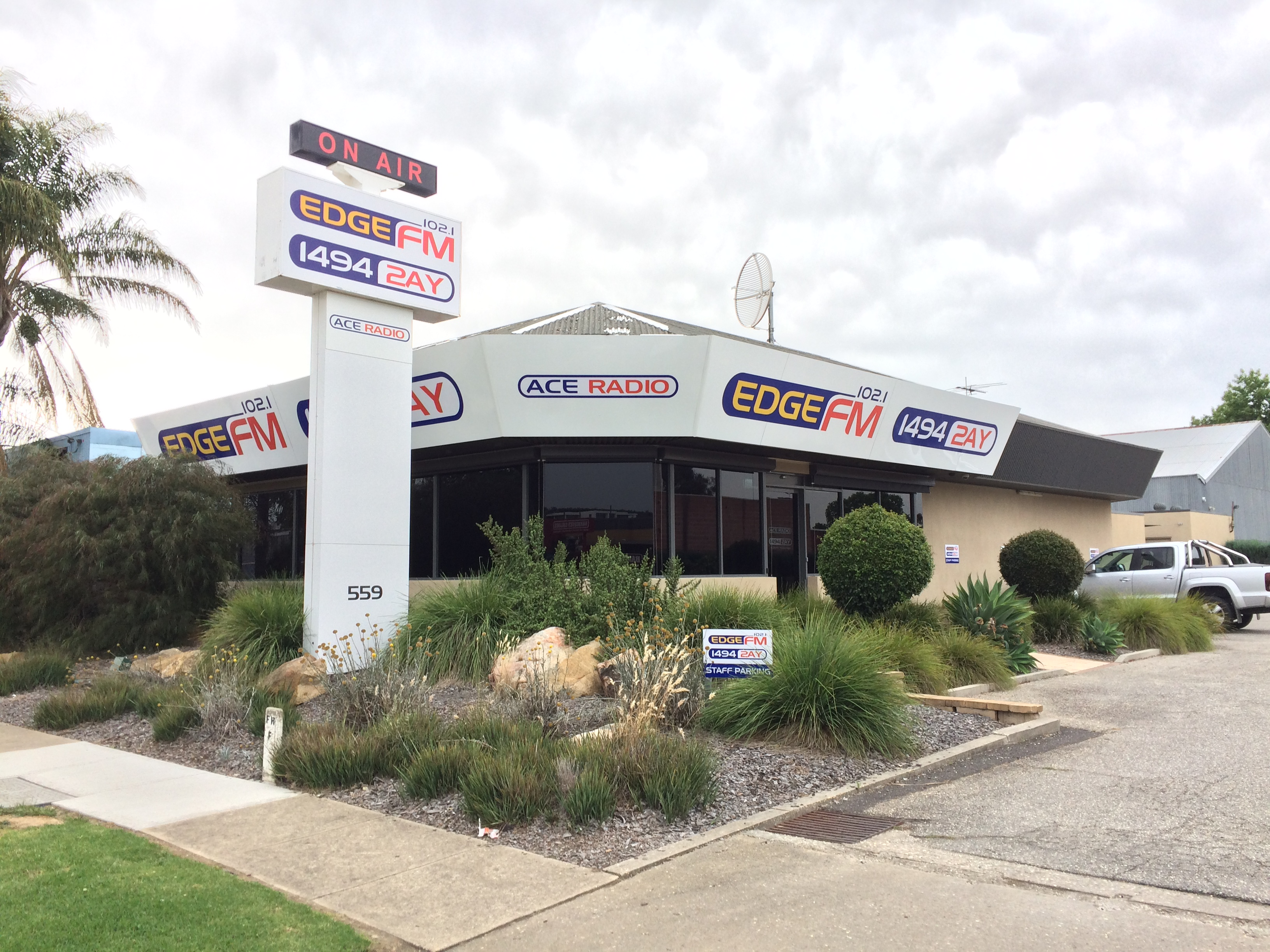
2AY and Edge FM studios in Albury

2AY Albury was founded by AWA and opened on 17 December 1930. In 1987, AWA put the station up for sale.

In 2005, 2AY and sister station 104.9 Star FM were purchased by DMG Radio Australia. Later in 2005, Macquarie Regional RadioWorks, through its purchase of most DMG Radio Australia's regional assets, owned 2AY, Star FM, and former cross-town rival 105.7 The River. Due to cross media ownership laws limiting the number of radio stations owned by one company in a market to two, Macquarie was required to sell one station. 2AY was sold in September 2005 to Ace Radio.
