= Wangaratta =

- City
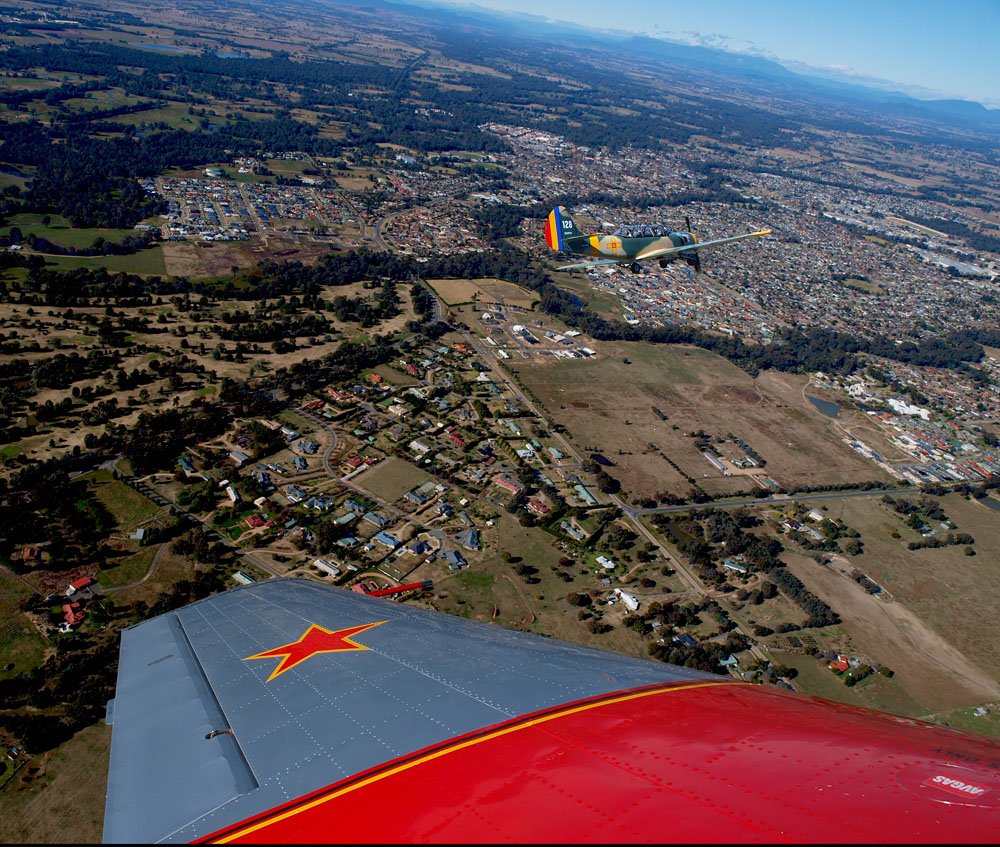
- Aerial view from the north-west, Hume Freeway bypass somewhere around top, One and Three Mile creeks meeting around the middle.

- Interactive map of Wangaratta
- Coordinates: 36°21′30″S 146°18′45″E
- Country: Australia
- State: Victoria
- Region: Hume
- LGA: Rural City of Wangaratta
- Location: 236 km (147 mi) from Melbourne; 200 km (120 mi) from Bendigo; 98 km (61 mi) from Shepparton; 73 km (45 mi) from Albury

Government
  - State electorate: Ovens Valley
  - Federal division: Indi

Area (2011 urban)
  - Total: 57.6 km^{2} (22.2 sq mi)
- Elevation: 150 m (490 ft)

Population
  - Total: 29,808 (2021)
  - Density: 517.5/km^{2} (1,340.3/sq mi)
- Time zone: UTC+10 (AEST)
  - Summer (DST): UTC+11 (AEST)
- Postcode: 3677
- County: Moira, Delatite, Bogong
- Mean max temp: 22.2 °C (72.0 °F)
- Mean min temp: 7.6 °C (45.7 °F)
- Annual rainfall: 613.6 mm (24.16 in)

Wangaratta (/ˌwæŋɡəˈrætə/ WANG-gə-RAT-ə) is a city in the northeast of Victoria, Australia, 236 km (147 mi) from Melbourne along the Hume Highway. The city had a population of 29,808 per the 2021 Australian Census.

The city is located at the junction of the Ovens and King rivers, which drain the northwestern slopes of the Victorian Alps. Wangaratta is the administrative centre and the most populous city in the Rural City of Wangaratta local government area.

== History ==
The original Aboriginal inhabitants of the area were the Pallanganmiddang people, with sub-groups known as Waywurru and Waveroo.

The first European explorers to pass through the Wangaratta area were Hume and Hovell (1824) who named the Oxley Plains immediately south of Wangaratta. Major Thomas Mitchell during his 1836 expedition made a favourable report of its potential as grazing pasture. The first squatter to arrive was Thomas Rattray in 1838 who built a hut (on the site of the Wangaratta RSL) founding a settlement known as "Ovens Crossing".

The post office in the area opened on 1 February 1843 as Ovens. The Ovens office, and the Kilmore office which opened the same day, were the fifth and sixth to open in the Port Phillip District and the first two inland offices.

The name Wangaratta was given by colonial surveyor Thomas Wedge in 1848 after the "Wangaratta" cattle station, the name of which is believed to have been derived from an indigenous language and meaning "nesting place of cormorants" or "meeting of the waters". The first land sales occurred shortly afterward and the population at the time was around 200. The first school was established by William Bindall on Chisholm Street with 17 students.

Gold was found nearby at Beechworth in February 1852 and by the end of the year more than 8,000 prospectors rushed the fields of Ovens and Beechworth. Wangaratta became a major service centre to these goldfields. As a result, the first bridge over the Ovens was completed in early 1855.

A seven-member council incorporated the Borough of Wangaratta on 19 June 1863.

The 1870s saw the settlement establish a number of key infrastructure and services, including the first water supply. Wangaratta District Base Hospital (WDBH) was founded in 1872 and the fire brigade was established in 1872. The railway to Melbourne was opened on 28 October 1873.

In 1884, the railway was connected through to Sydney.

The population at the turn of the century reached 2,500 and the centre had developed an imposing streetscape of hotels, commercial public and religious buildings.

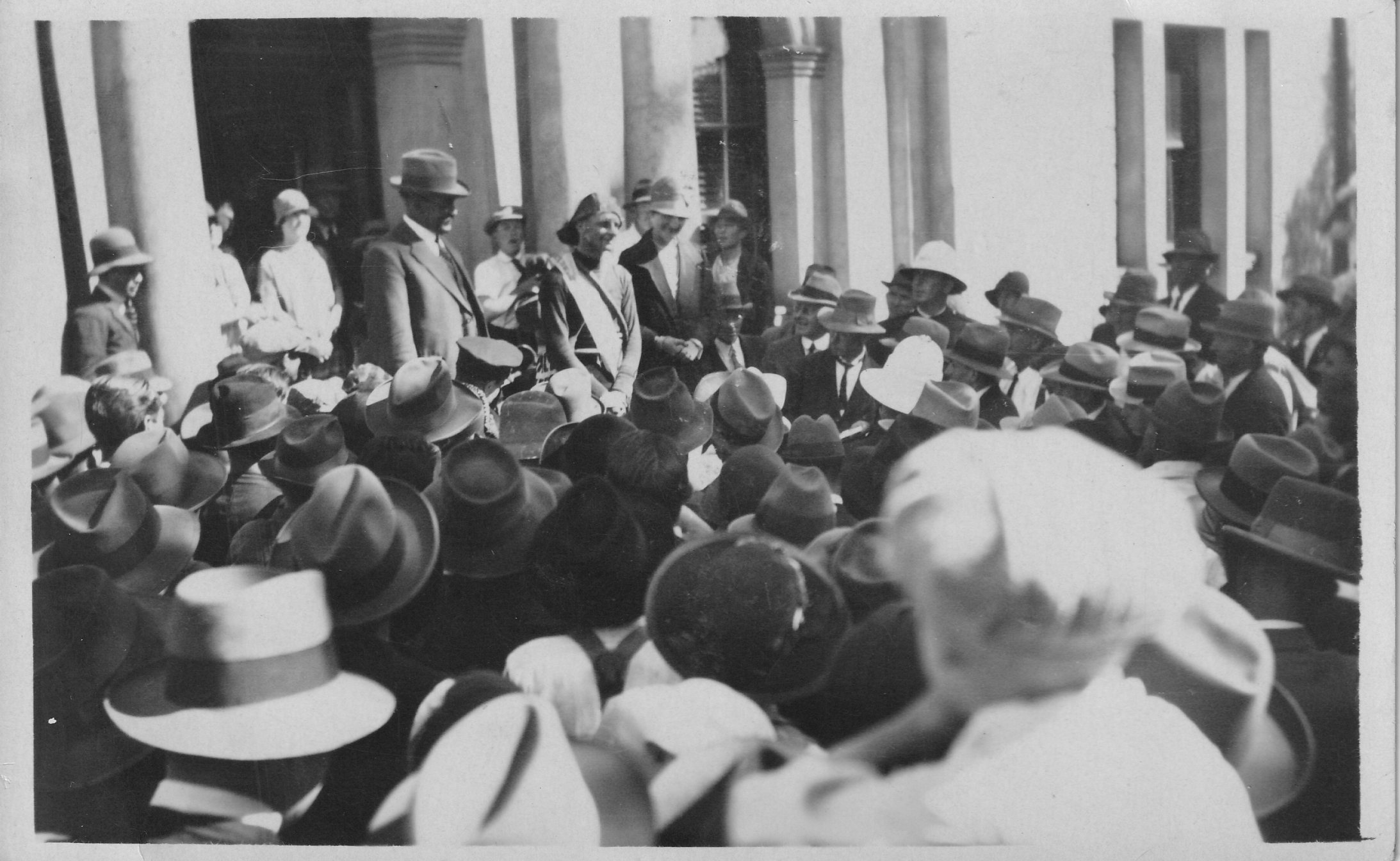
Cr George Handley, Mayor and Hubert Opperman in Wangaratta, 15 November 1927, after Opperman won the first stage of the Dunlop Grand Prix

The Duke of Gloucester visited Wangaratta during his tour of Australia in 1934.

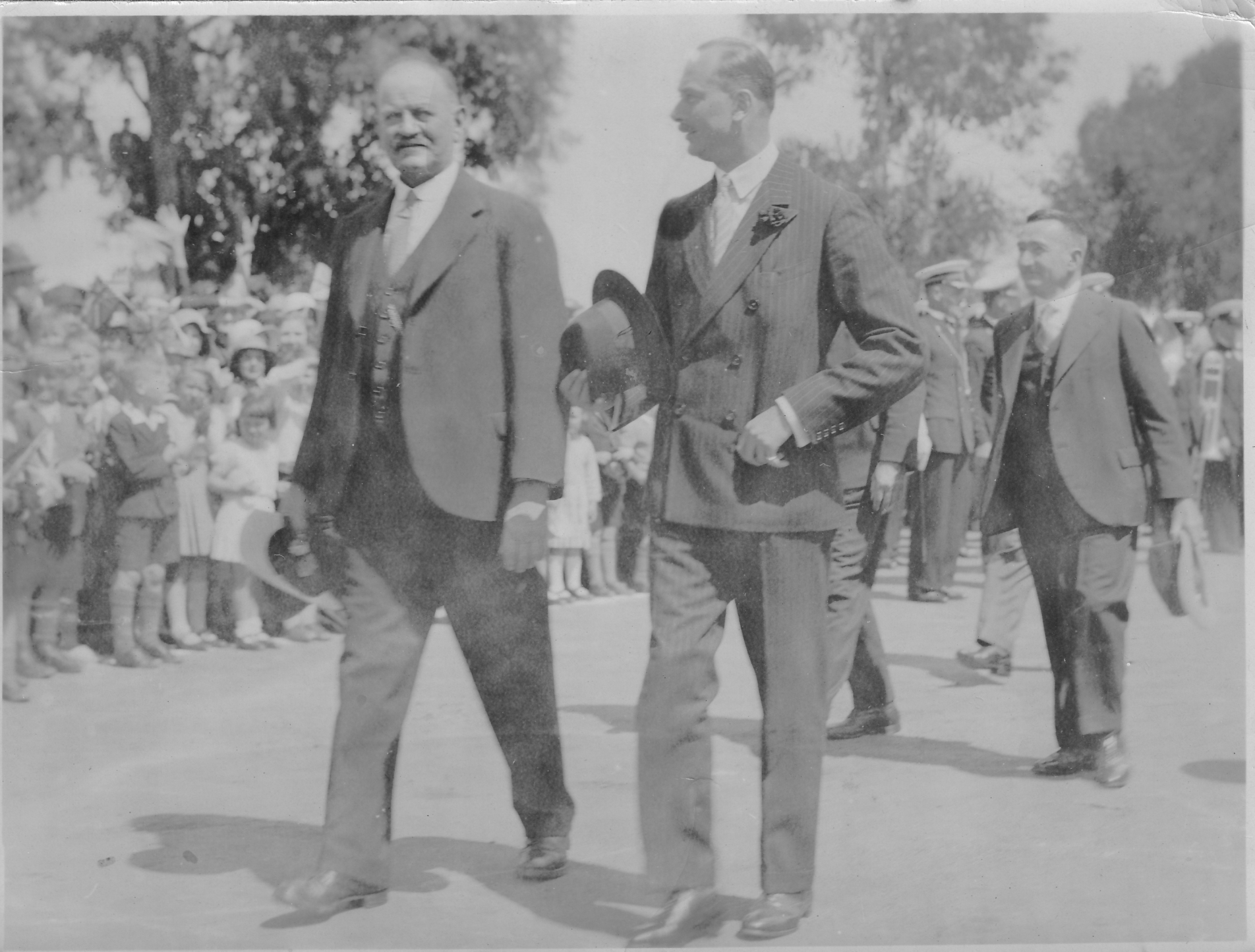
George Handley (Mayor) and Duke of Gloucester on his visit to Wangaratta, 22 October 1934

Bruck textile mills was established in 1946, employing over a thousand workers.

Wangaratta was proclaimed a city on 12 April 1959 with a population of 12,000 people. New municipal offices were opened in 1980 which became the headquarters of the Rural City of Wangaratta after the amalgamation of municipalities in 1995.

== Demographics ==
According to the 2021 census of Population, there were 29,808 people in Wangaratta.

- Aboriginal and Torres Strait Islander people made up 1.9% of the population.
- 84.6% of people were born in Australia. The next most common countries of birth were England 1.9%, Italy 1.0% and New Zealand 0.7%.
- 89.0% of people spoke only English at home. Other languages spoken at home included Italian at 1.4%.
- The most common responses for religion were No Religion 41.7%, Catholic 23.6% and Anglican 12.0%.

== Geography and landmarks ==
The geographical layout of the city is unusual in that the business district is located at the north-eastern extremity of the urban area, with outlying suburbs extending only to the south and west. The reason for this arrangement is that the area beyond the rivers, to the north and east of the business district, was until the 1990s prone to flooding and so unsuitable for building. Levees were constructed in the 1990s to alleviate the flooding; however, development in this area has been slow.

Notable buildings include the Holy Trinity Anglican Cathedral and its Cathedral Close, St. Patrick's Catholic Church and the eccentric art déco courthouse.

== Climate ==
Wangaratta has a temperate climate with warm to hot summers and cool, damp winters. Since the warmest month mean reaches 22 °C (72 °F), Wangaratta would have a humid subtropical climate (Cfa) in the Köppen climate classification. Sleet falls occasionally, but settled snowfalls are a rare occurrence.

Rain falls as thunderstorms in the summer, and in winter with cold fronts. Occasional severe heat waves are caused by hot, dry air from the central deserts of Australia moving over the area. Temperatures of 40 °C (104 °F) and slightly above occur 2–4 times a year on average; however, heatwaves are often succeeded by cold fronts, which cause a significant drop in the temperature. Wangaratta has cool nights and mornings in the summer, due in part to its south-western location exposing it to cold airmasses off the Southern Ocean. The city gets 105.1 clear days annually, which is akin to Sydney and Wollongong, however the distribution is wildly different; Wangaratta being much sunnier from December to March, but the inverse from May to September.

Rainfall averages out to 613.6 millimetres (24.16 in) a year, most of which falls in winter with cold frontal showers; however, these can occur at any time of year; and the main form of rainfall in late spring and summer is that from thunderstorms. Extreme temperatures have ranged from 45.8 °C (114.4 °F) on 3 January 1990 and again on 7 February 2009 to −7.2 °C (19.0 °F) on 14 June 2006.

Climate data for Wangaratta Aero (1987–2022); 153 m AMSL; 36.42° S, 146.31° E
Month	Jan	Feb	Mar	Apr	May	Jun	Jul	Aug	Sep	Oct	Nov	Dec	Year
Record high °C (°F)	45.8 (114.4)	45.8 (114.4)	39.4 (102.9)	33.9 (93.0)	28.2 (82.8)	21.7 (71.1)	20.0 (68.0)	23.1 (73.6)	29.4 (84.9)	35.8 (96.4)	41.4 (106.5)	43.1 (109.6)	45.8 (114.4)
Mean daily maximum °C (°F)	32.1 (89.8)	30.9 (87.6)	27.6 (81.7)	22.6 (72.7)	17.4 (63.3)	13.9 (57.0)	13.0 (55.4)	14.5 (58.1)	17.6 (63.7)	21.5 (70.7)	25.8 (78.4)	29.3 (84.7)	22.2 (71.9)
Mean daily minimum °C (°F)	14.3 (57.7)	13.7 (56.7)	10.8 (51.4)	7.0 (44.6)	4.3 (39.7)	2.9 (37.2)	2.5 (36.5)	3.0 (37.4)	4.6 (40.3)	6.5 (43.7)	9.5 (49.1)	11.8 (53.2)	7.6 (45.6)
Record low °C (°F)	3.5 (38.3)	3.0 (37.4)	1.1 (34.0)	−2.7 (27.1)	−5.0 (23.0)	−7.2 (19.0)	−5.6 (21.9)	−6.3 (20.7)	−3.3 (26.1)	−3.3 (26.1)	0.1 (32.2)	0.9 (33.6)	−7.2 (19.0)
Average precipitation mm (inches)	44.6 (1.76)	41.2 (1.62)	40.7 (1.60)	38.6 (1.52)	56.0 (2.20)	64.9 (2.56)	63.0 (2.48)	57.8 (2.28)	54.3 (2.14)	51.5 (2.03)	51.6 (2.03)	44.2 (1.74)	613.6 (24.16)
Average precipitation days (≥ 0.2 mm)	5.8	5.4	6.0	6.9	10.9	14.5	16.4	14.6	11.6	9.6	8.0	7.1	116.8
Average afternoon relative humidity (%)	28	32	33	42	56	67	67	61	55	46	38	30	46
Source: Bureau of Meteorology

== Governance ==
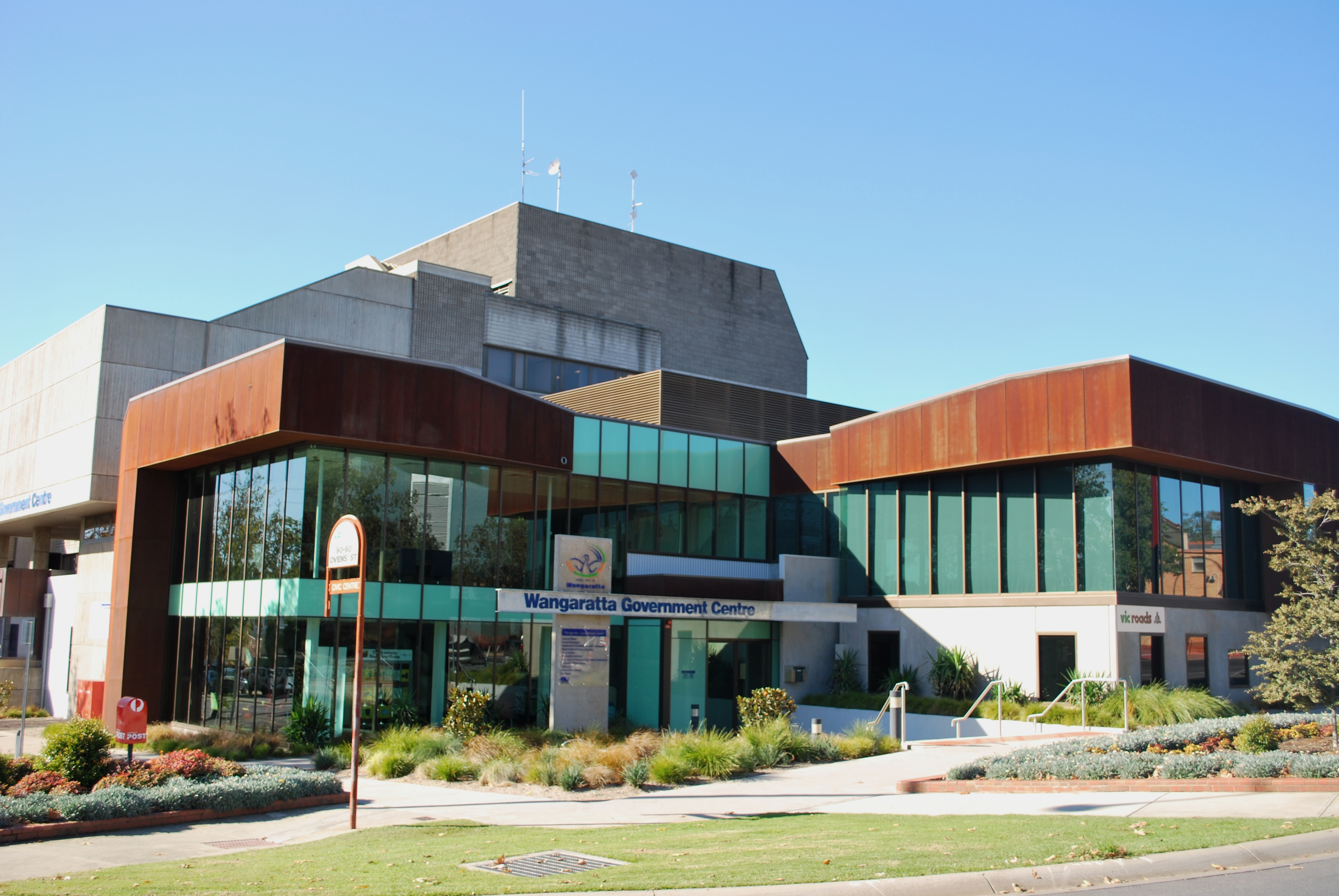
Government Centre

In local government, the Wangaratta region is covered by the Rural City of Wangaratta. The council was created in 1994 as an amalgamation of a number of other municipalities in the region with the council chambers located at the Government Centre in central Wangaratta. The city is represented by seven councillors elected once every four years by postal voting. The mayor is elected from these councillors by their colleagues for a one-year term.

In September 2013 the council was sacked by the state government. Victorian Local Government Minister Jeanette Powell said this was because "Council has failed to provide effective leadership and service for the community". The council will be replaced by an administrator who will serve until the 2016 local government elections.

In state politics, Wangaratta is located in the Legislative Assembly district of Ovens Valley currently held by the National Party of Australia. Tim McCurdy is the current Member of Parliament for the Ovens Valley district.

In federal politics, Wangaratta is located in a single House of Representatives division—the Division of Indi. The Division of Indi was seen as a safe Liberal Party of Australia seat from 1977 until 2013, when the sitting member, Sophie Mirabella was defeated by independent candidate Cathy McGowan. Since 2019 and as of October 2026, Helen Haines is the federal Member of Parliament for the Division of Indi, making history as the first independent candidate to succeed another independent, namely Cathy McGowan, in Federal Parliament.

== Industry ==
There is a considerable wine and gourmet food industry in the nearby Milawa and King Valley region. Other notable industries in the area include Australian Textile Mills formerly Bruck Textiles, Wilson Fabrics that now occupies the old IBM facility, Merriwa Industries and Australian Country Spinners.

Previously multi-national IBM manufactured computers in Wangaratta.

== Culture and sport ==
=== Sport ===
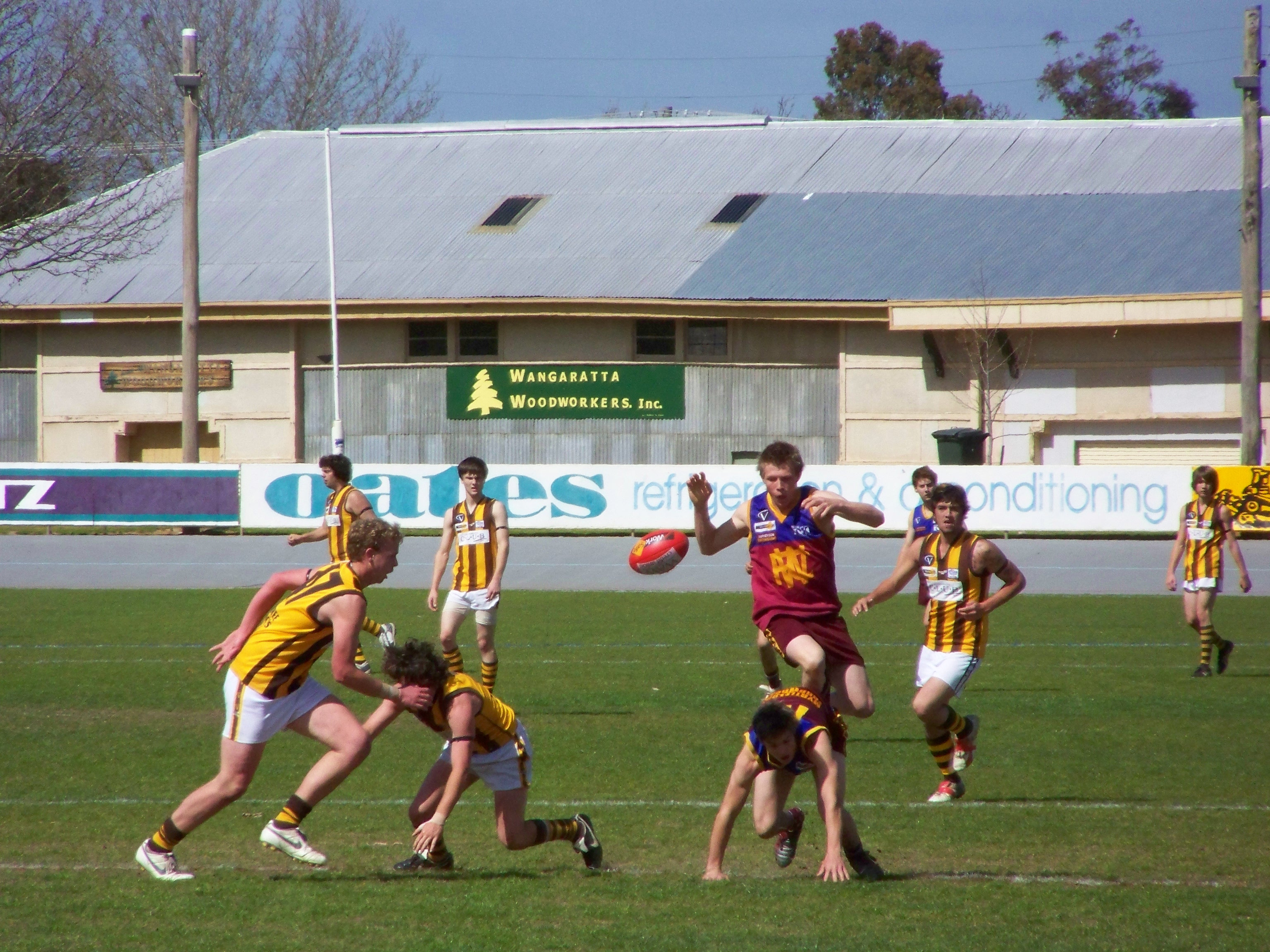
A Victorian Country Football League match in Wangaratta

Australian rules football, cricket and Netball are the most popular sports

There are three Australian rules football clubs in Wangaratta. The Wangaratta Football Club, the Wangaratta Rovers Football Club, both competing in the Ovens and Murray Football League, and the North Wangaratta Football Club, which competes in the Ovens and King Football League. The close proximity of the Rovers and Wangaratta grounds reflects the historical sectarian split in membership of the clubs; Rovers membership being predominantly Catholic and Wangaratta being predominantly Protestant. Many players also travel to play for Ovens & King clubs based in smaller towns in the King Valley.

The city hosted several games for the 2005 Australian Football International Cup event, with several countries competing in the sport of Australian rules football. The event was played at the City Oval and Showgrounds and set the attendance records for the tournament to date.

Cricket in Wangaratta is organised by the Wangaratta and District Cricket Association. Clubs include City Colts, Wangaratta-Magpies & Rovers United Bruck.

Wangaratta City Football Club is a soccer club based at South Wangaratta Reserve. Founded in 1951, they compete in the Albury Wodonga Football Association.

The Wangaratta Knights play rugby league in the Goulburn Murray Rugby League competition. Founded in 2017, the club plays its home games at the Glenrowan Recreation Reserve in nearby Glenrowan.

Wangaratta has a horse racing club, the Wangaratta Turf Club, which schedules around eleven race meetings a year including the Wangaratta Cup meeting in April.

The Wangaratta Greyhound Racing Club, which held regular meetings at the same venue, has been discontinued. Avian Park is no longer used.

Golfers play at the course of the Wangaratta Golf Club on Yarrawonga Road, or at the course of the Jubilee Golf Club at Wangandary nearby. A nine-hole course is at Boorhaman to the north of Wangaratta.

Between 1953 and 1956, the North Eastern Car Club ran motor racing meetings on the gravel and earth airstrip located on Wangaratta Common, south of the town centre. The circuit ran up and down the airstrip, with a loop at the western end.

The North East Windsport Club regularly sail "Land Yachts" called Blokarts (Blo-karts) at their sailing site at the nearby town of Springhurst.

The city is home to the Northeast Bushrangers who play in the Big V basketball league. They play their home games at the Wangaratta YMCA.

=== Events ===
The main annual event is the Wangaratta New Years Eve event, attracting 10,000 people to the Wangaratta Showgrounds to see fireworks and popular live music. The Outdoor Ball featuring Latin inspired music and international food vendors is another main attraction for the town. Both these events are free to attend and hosted by the Rural City of Wangaratta.

== Education ==
Wangaratta is served by three secondary schools: Wangaratta High School (public) alongside two private schools, Cathedral College and Galen Catholic College. The town also has seven primary schools. Four are public: Appin Park Primary School, Wangaratta (Chisolm Street) Primary School, Wangaratta West Primary School and Yarrunga Primary School. Three of the primary schools are private: Our Lady's Catholic Primary School, St. Bernand's Primary School and St. Patrick's Primary School. Wangaratta also has its own specialist school for people with disabilities, Wangaratta District Specialist School.

The Goulburn Ovens Institute of TAFE has two Wangaratta campuses. The Docker street campus offers a broad range of courses from business studies to music with a central area containing a cafeteria, library and student services. The Christensens Lane campus on the outskirts of Wangaratta is the home for the National Centre for Equine Education as well as providing courses in horticulture.

In 2015 the Christensens Lane campus moved to a bigger site in Tone Road. And in 2016 Charles Sturt University also added a campus there. The old Christensens Lane campus was then dismantled to make way for a new housing estate.

== Health services ==
Wangaratta District Base Hospital (WDBH) was founded in 1872. More wards were added as the hospital expanded though the 1970s and 1980s, before being officially renamed Northeast Health Wangaratta (NHW) by 2007 (although it continues to be referred to colloquially as Wangaratta Hospital). In this year it started providing aged care services, including a residential facility named Iloura.

In December 2022, a major redevelopment of Wangaratta Hospital was completed, funded by the Regional Health Infrastructure Fund, which increased the hospital's capacity in many areas. The expansion included a new intensive care unit and a short stay unit, as well as enlargement of the emergency department and the addition of a new paediatric ward with parent accommodation.

== Transport ==
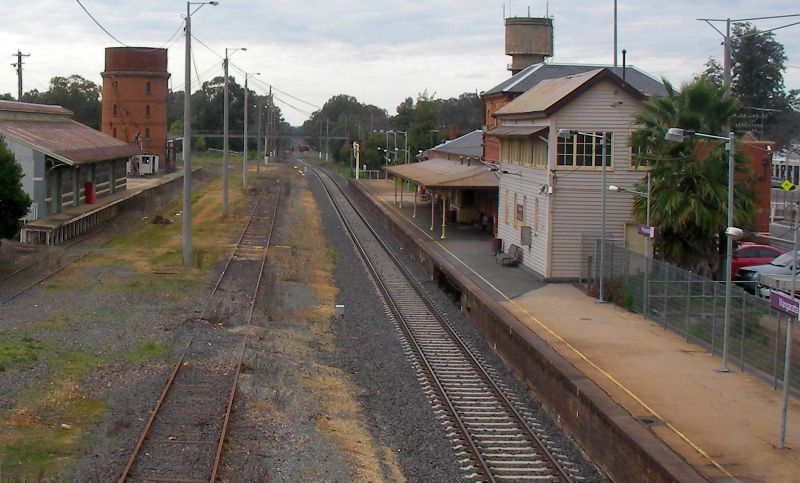
Wangaratta railway station

The Hume Freeway (M31) bypasses the city to the south and east, while the C314 now forms the main road through it (as Murphy Street and Wangaratta Road). The city is located at the junction of several other major roads, the Great Alpine Road (B500), Wangaratta-Yarrawonga Road (C374), Wangaratta-Whitfield Road (C521) and Wangaratta-Kilfeera Road (C523). A city bus service runs every half an hour during the day on weekdays and on Saturday mornings on a route covering Wangaratta's West End, the business district, Yarrunga and more recently, Yarrawonga Road.

Rail transport services both passengers and freight. Wangaratta railway station is on the North East railway line, the main railway line between Sydney and Melbourne. It is served by the Albury V/Line rail service thrice-daily as well as the NSW TrainLink XPT service twice-daily in both directions.

Historically, Wangaratta was the busy junction of several railway branch lines, including the broad gauge 5' 3"Yackandandah railway line, a narrow gauge 2' 6" Whitfield railway line and the broad gauge 5' 3" Bright and Beechworth railway line, all of which have since closed. Another short 5' 3" gauge branch line ran west to a wheat silo located on the north side of the Ovens River at Boorhaman. The current rail line through the town is the 4' 8" standard gauge rail opened in 1962.

The Murray to the Mountains Rail Trail is a shared cycling and walking track that follows the way of the former Bright railway line. The Hume Freeway runs directly next to Wangaratta.

Wangaratta is also serviced by a small regional airport, Wangaratta Airport.

== Environmental issues ==
=== Land contamination at Wangaratta Clay Target Club ===
In 2016, EPA Victoria received reports that lead shot were being used at the North Wangaratta Recreation Reserve. Several shots were found near the Wangaratta Clay Target Shooting Club in the Reserve. The Rural council tested the area and discovered lead levels to be above healthy conditions. The club closed for six months to remove the contaminated soil which has been stored by the club. A risk mitigation plan has been established to safely manage the soil.

=== Odour pollution at sausage skin manufacturing factory ===
Van Hessen Australia is an Australian sausage skin manufacturer whose factory is situated on Shanley street in Wangaratta and impacted local communities with odour pollution in 2022. More than 160 reports were received in 2 months by EPA Victoria.

The smell was due to Van Hessen's private wastewater treatment system which included desludging activities and upset conditions in the wastewater treatment pond. The company exceeded its licence boundary and received several notices from EPA to prevent further smell and maintain stable conditions.

In December 2023, Van Hessen was found guilty in court and was ordered to provide $75,000 to an environmental improvement project in South Wangaratta.

== Media ==
=== Television ===
Network television is broadcast in Wangaratta by the Seven Network, WIN Television (affiliated with the Nine Network), Network 10, the Australian Broadcasting Corporation (ABC) and the Special Broadcasting Service (SBS).

Of the three commercial networks, WIN Television airs a half-hour WIN News bulletin each weeknight at 5.30 pm, produced from a newsroom in the city and broadcast from studios in Wollongong.

Short local news updates and weather updates are broadcast by Network 10 throughout the day, produced and broadcast from its Hobart studios. The Seven Network airs short local news and weather updates throughout the day, produced and broadcast from its Canberra studios.

=== Radio Stations ===
FM

- 87.6 MHz Orbit FM – Relay of Kiss FM
- 88.0 MHz Vision Radio Network – Christian narrowcast
- 99.3 MHz RSN Racing & Sport – Horse Racing narrowcast
- 101.3 MHz Oak FM – Community
- 102.1 MHz Edge FM – North East Broadcasters
- 106.5 MHz ABC Goulburn Murray – North East Broadcasters

AM

- 756 kHz Radio National – ABC
- 1566 kHz 3NE – North East Broadcasters

Some stations from nearby centres such as Albury–Wodonga and Shepparton can be heard across the region.

=== Newspapers ===
Local newspaper is served by the Wangaratta Chronicle which is available in print and online.

== Notable residents and former residents ==
- Rebecca Allen (born 1992), WNBA player
- William Ah Ket, Chinese Australian barrister, 1876–1936
- Daniel Andrews, Former premier of Victoria
- Sir John Bowser, Premier of Victoria, 1917–1918
- Deanne Butler (born 1981), basketball player
- Alipate Carlile, Australian rules footballer with Port Adelaide
- Isobelle Carmody (born 1958), author
- Barrie Cassidy, political journalist, born in Wangaratta
- Nick Cave, popular musician
- Lloyd Crosbie, double murderer
- Greg Crump, 5x Paralympic Wheelchair Tennis Coach
- Anne Curtis, Filipina actress, singer, TV Host
- Sir Edward "Weary" Dunlop, 1907–1993
- Simon Abney-Hastings, The Rt Hon. The 15th Earl of Loudoun (born 1974), an Australian who inherited a British peerage
- Belinda Hocking, Olympic backstroke swimmer, born 1990
- Steve Johnson, Australian rules footballer with Geelong
- Chris Naish, Former Australian rules footballer with Richmond and Port Adelaide
- Sophie Mirabella, Member for Indi, 2001–2013
- Nick Morris, Paralympic Champion men's wheelchair basketball Atlanta 1996
- Sebastian Pasquali, soccer player with Ajax and Melbourne Victory
- Mette-Marit, Crown Princess of Norway
- Darcy Vescio, Australian rules footballer with Carlton Football Club
- Ben Reid, Australian rules footballer with Collingwood
- Sam Reid, Australian rules footballer with Sydney
- Quinton Tidswell, artist, died in Wangaratta in 1991
- George Turner, Science Fiction and Miles Franklin award-winning novelist
- Dean Woods, Olympic Champion cyclist Los Angeles 1984, Died in 2022
- Frederick William Wray, 1920 canon Holy Trinity Cathedral, 1928–1935 parish rector

== Bibliography ==
- Larsen, Wal. The Mayday Hills Railway, Wal Larsen, Bright, 1976.
- O'Callaghan, Bill and Bill Findlay (1984). "Wangaratta, 1959–1984: A Silver City", City of Wangaratta.
- O'Brien, Antony. Shenanigans on the Ovens Goldfields: the 1859 Election, Artillery Publishing, 2005.
- Oberg, Leon. Railways of Australia, Reed, Sydney, 1975.
- Thompson, John E. Focus on Victoria's Narrow Gauge Whitfield Line, Puffing Billy Preservation Society, Belgrave, 2002.
- "Wangaratta: Capital of North Eastern Victoria", (1927) Committee of the Back to Wangaratta Celebrations.
- Whittaker, D. M. (1963). "Wangaratta: Being the History of the Township that sprang up at Ovens Crossing and grew into a modern City", Wangaratta City Council.
- Why Wangaratta, and Moments in Jazz (books on the Wangaratta Festival of Jazz and Blues).

== Gallery ==
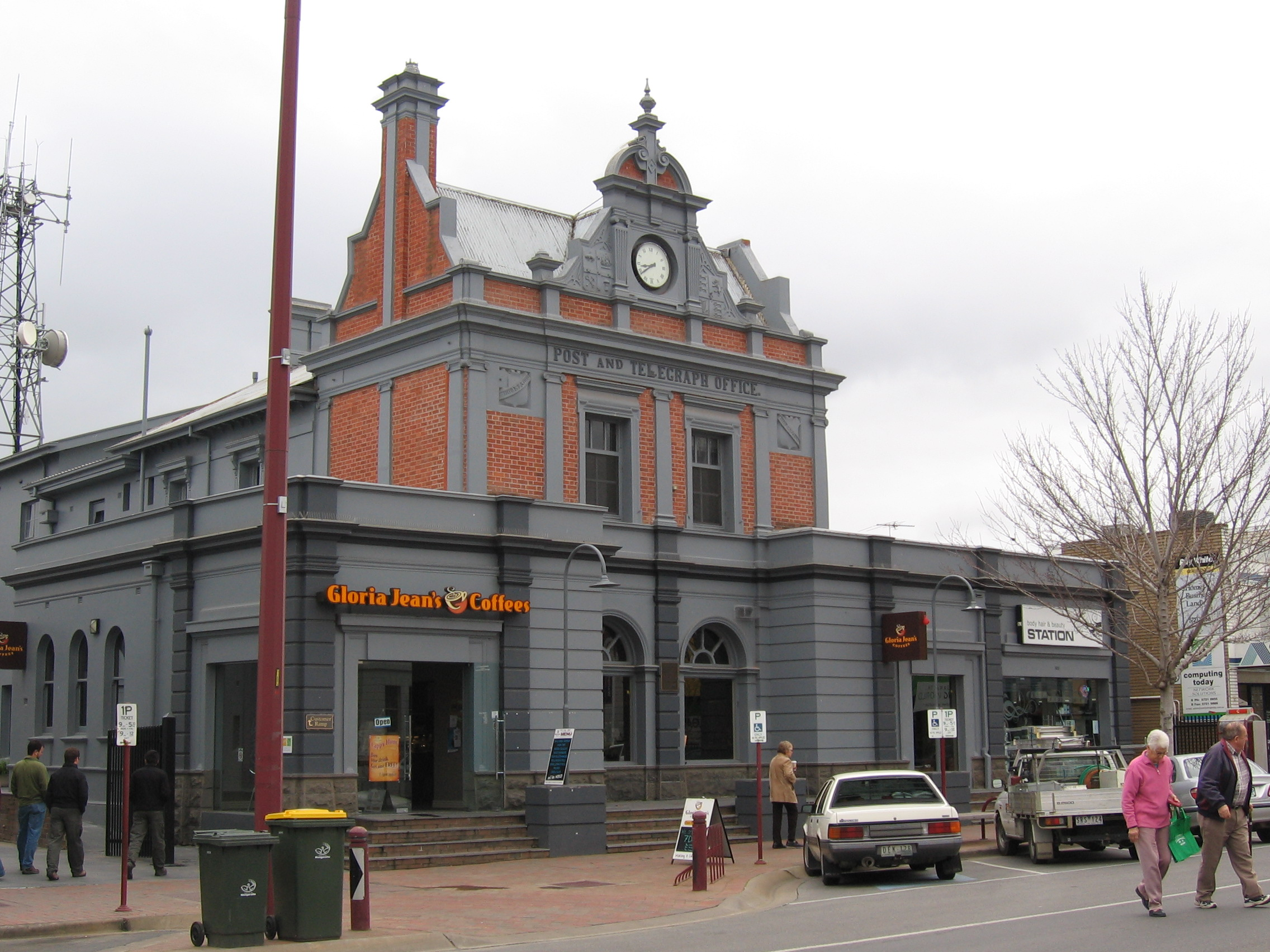
Wangaratta Old Post Office

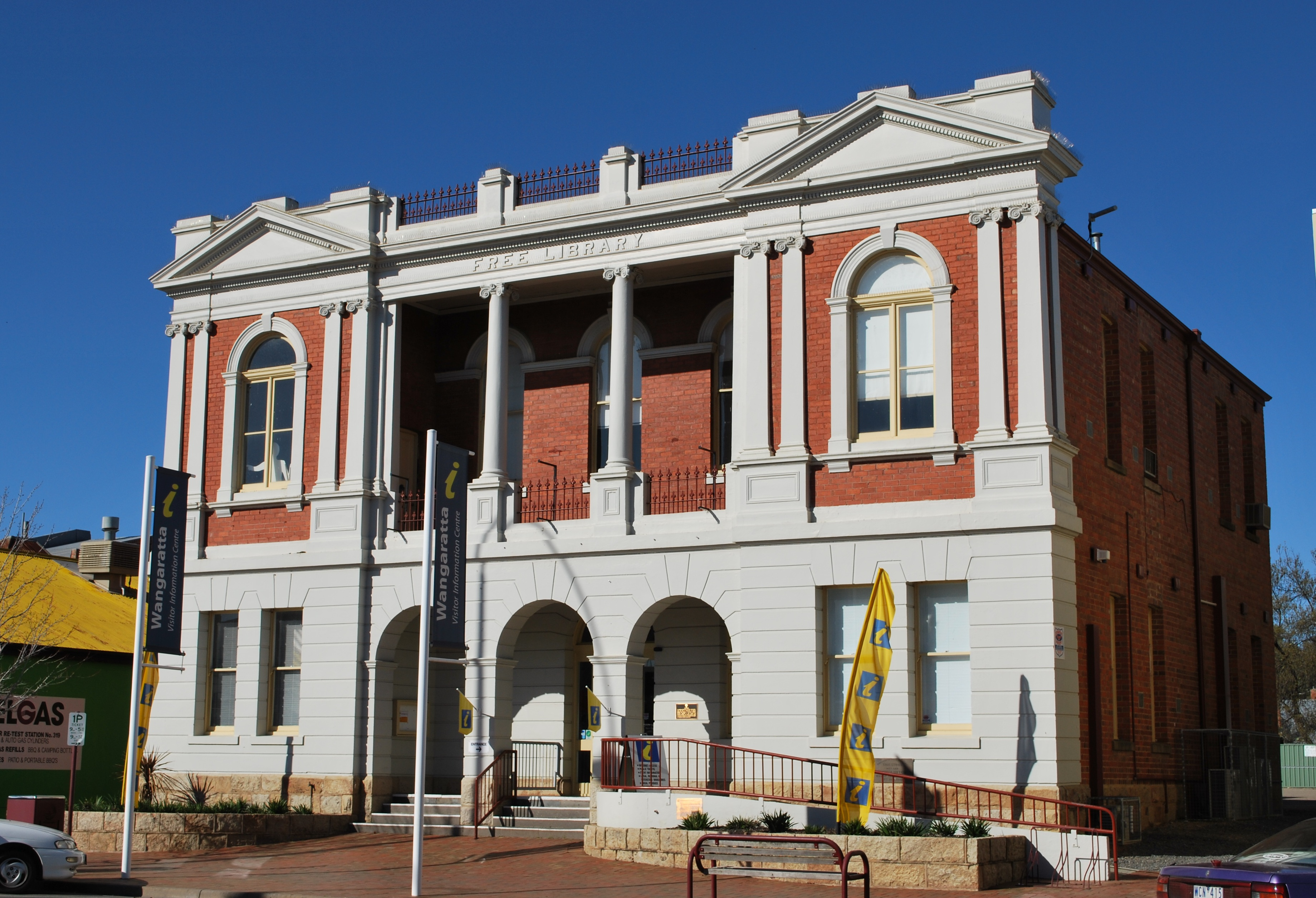
Wangaratta Library

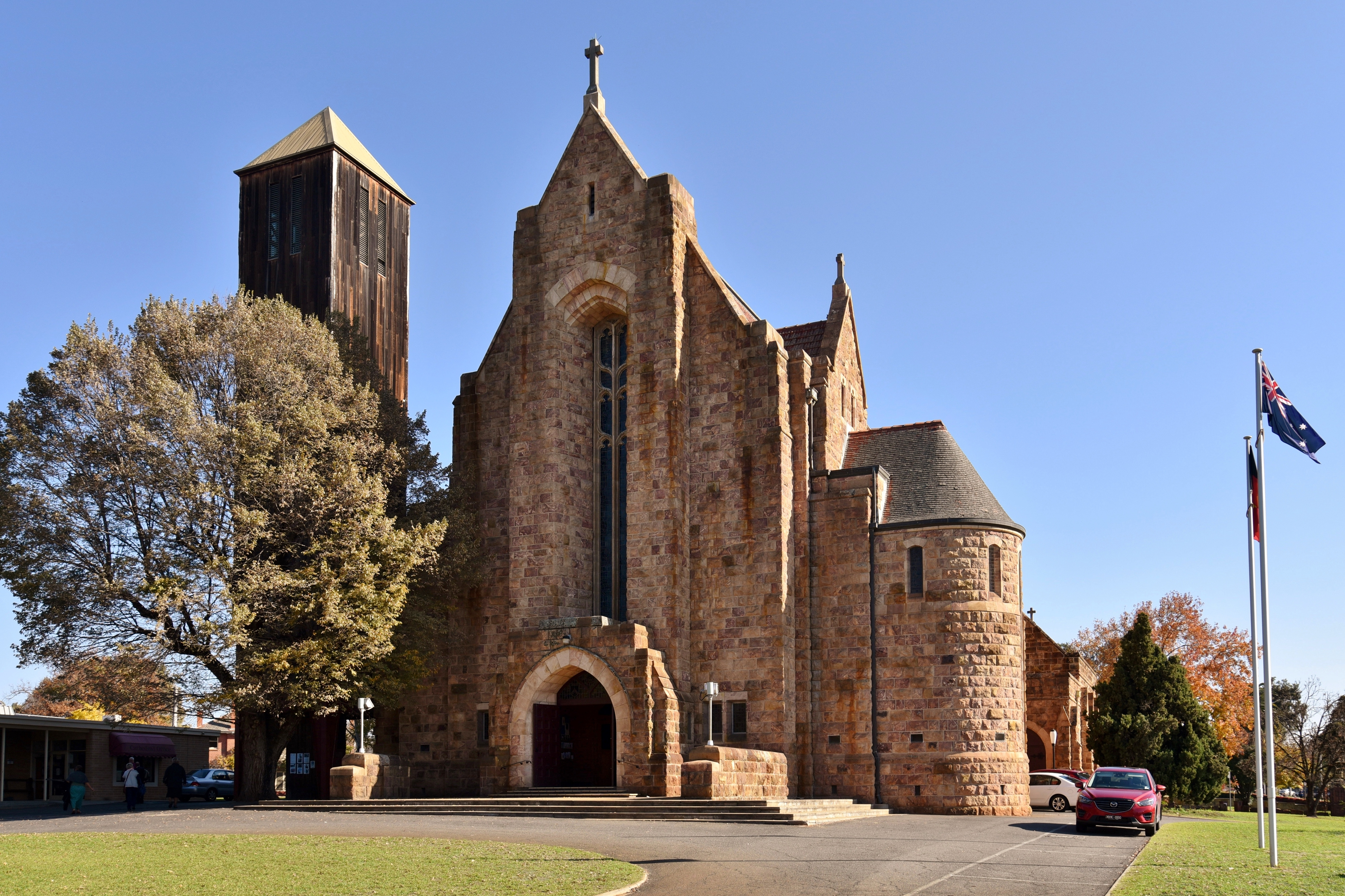
Holy Trinity Anglican Cathedral

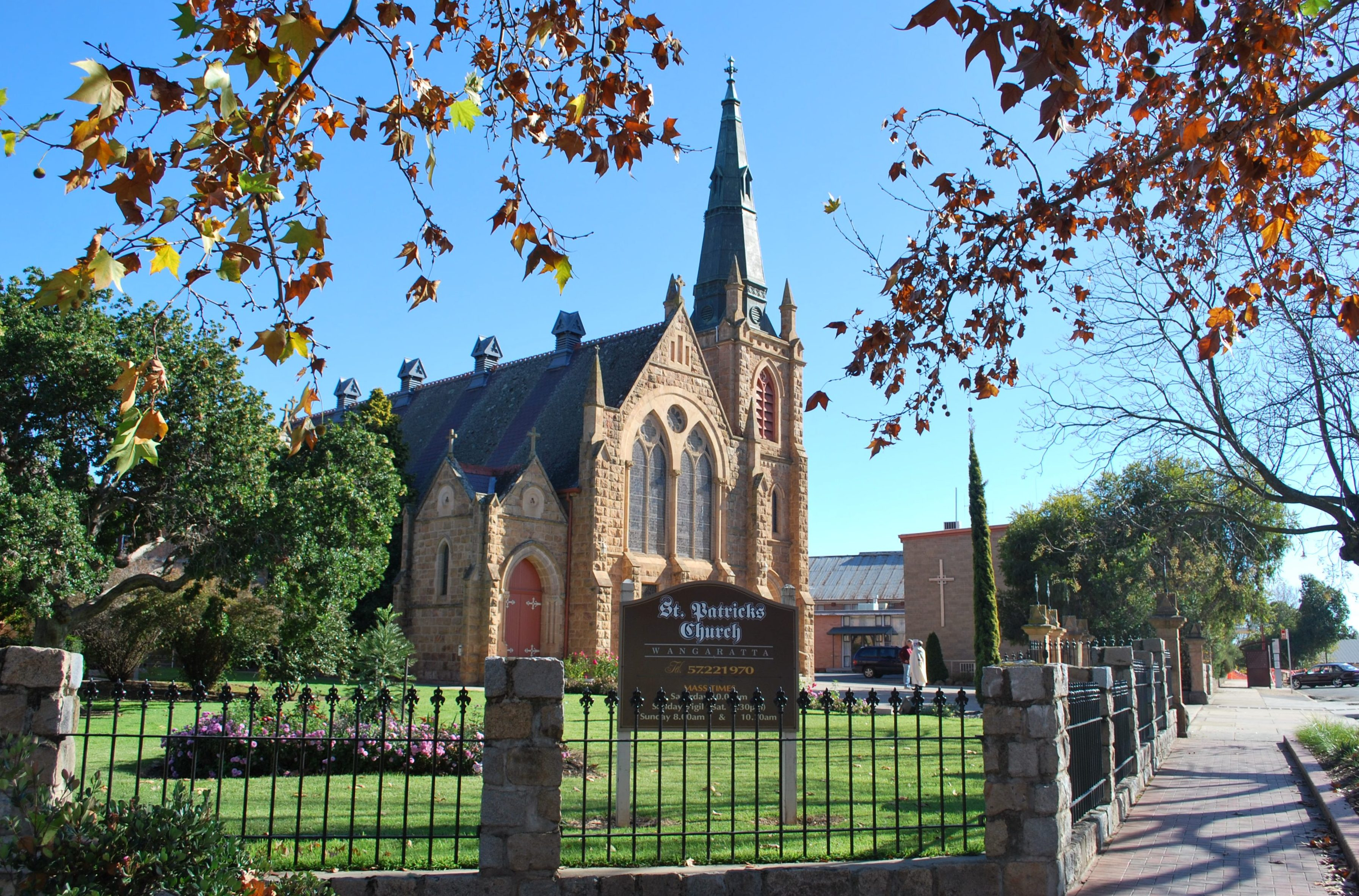
Wangaratta Roman Catholic Church

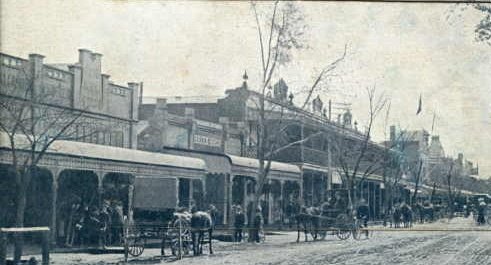
Murphy Street in 1908
