= List of radio station callsigns in Victoria =

The following is a list of Australian radio station callsigns beginning with the number 3, indicating radio stations in the state of Victoria.

Callsign	Area served	Freq.	Band	On-air ID	Purpose	Cite
3ABCFM	Victoria	various	FM	ABC Classic FM	National	
3ABCRN	Victoria	various	FM	ABC Radio National	National	
3ABCRR	Bendigo	91.1	FM	ABC Central Victoria	National	
3AK	Melbourne	1116	AM	SEN	Commercial	
3APL	Bacchus Marsh	098.5	FM	Apple 98.5FM	Community	
3AW	Melbourne	0693	AM	3AW	Commercial	
3BAY	Geelong	093.9	FM	Bay FM	Commercial	
3BBA	Ballarat	103.1	FM	Power FM	Commercial	
3BBB	Ballarat	099.9	FM	Voice FM	Community	
3BBO	Bendigo	093.5	FM	Triple M Bendigo	Commercial	
3BBR	Warragul	103.1	FM	3BBR	Community	
3BBS	Bendigo	101.5	FM	Bendigo's Fresh FM	Community	
3BDG	Bendigo	091.9	FM	hit91.9 Bendigo	Commercial	
3BGR	Ballarat	103.9	FM	Good News Radio	Community	
3BPH	Bendigo	088.7	FM	Vision Australia Radio	Community	
3BT	Ballarat	1314	AM	RSN Racing & Sport	Commercial	
3CAT	Geelong	095.5	FM	K-Rock	Commercial	
3CCS	Colac	106.3	FM	Mixx FM	Commercial	
3CH	Kyneton	100.7	FM	Highlands FM	Community	
3CR	Melbourne	0855	AM	3CR	Community	
3CRR	Ballarat	107.9	FM	ABC Ballarat	National	
3CS	Colac	1134	AM	3CS	Commercial	
3EA	Melbourne	1224	AM	SBS Radio	National	
3ECB	Melbourne Eastern Suburbs	098.1	FM	Eastern FM	Community	
3EE	Melbourne	1278	AM	Magic 1278	Commercial	
3EL	Maryborough/Bendigo	1071	AM	Gold Central Victoria	Commercial	
3EON	Bendigo	096.5	FM	KLFM	Community	
3FOX	Melbourne	101.9	FM	Fox FM	Commercial	
3GCB	Latrobe Valley	103.9	FM	Life FM	Community	
3GCR	Latrobe Valley	104.7	FM	Gippsland FM	Community	
3GDR	Waverley	095.7	FM	Golden Days Radio	Community	
3GFM	Maryborough	099.1	FM	Goldfields FM	Community	
3GG	Warragul	0531	AM	3GG	Commercial	
3GGR	Geelong	096.3	FM	96three	Community	
3GI	Sale	0828	AM	ABC Gippsland	National	
3GLR	Latrobe Valley	100.7	FM	ABC Gippsland	National	
3GPH	Geelong	099.5	FM	Vision Australia Radio	Community	
3GRR	Echuca	104.7	FM	EMFM	Community	
3GV	Sale	1242	AM	Gold 1242	Commercial	
3GVR	Goulburn Valley	097.7	FM	ABC Shepparton	National	
3HA	Hamilton	0981	AM	3HA	Commercial	
3HCR	Omeo	097.3	FM	High Country Radio	Community	
3HFM	Hamilton	088.9	FM	Mixx FM	Commercial	
3HHH	Horsham	096.5	FM	Triple H	Community	
3HOT	Mildura	106.7	FM	Hot FM	Community	
3INR	Melbourne North East Suburbs	096.5	FM	Inner FM	Community	
3JJJ	Victoria	various	FM	triple j	National	
3JOY	Melbourne City	094.9	FM	Joy 94.9	Community	
3KKZ	Melbourne	104.3	FM	Gold 104.3	Commercial	
3KND	Melbourne	1503	AM	3KND	Community	
3LO	Melbourne	0774	AM	ABC Melbourne	National	
3MBR	Murrayville	103.5	FM	3MBR	Community	
3MBS	Melbourne	103.5	FM	3MBS	Community	
3MCR	Mansfield	099.7	FM	Radio Mansfield	Community	
3MDA	Mildura	099.5	FM	hit99.5 Sunraysia	Commercial	
3MDR	Mountain Districts	097.1	FM	3MDR	Community	
3MEL	Melbourne	100.3	FM	Nova	Commercial	
3MFM	Leongatha	088.1	FM	South Coast FM	Community	
3MGB	Mallacoota	101.7	FM	3MGB	Community	
3MIL	Sunraysia and the Murray Valley	104.3 & 102.1	FM	ABC Mildura Swan Hill	National	
3ML	Mildura	1467	AM	River 1467	Commercial	
3MMM	Melbourne	105.1	FM	Triple M Melbourne	Commercial	
3MP	Melbourne	1377	AM	3MP	Commercial	
3MPH	Mildura	107.5	FM	Vision Australia Radio	Community	
3MRR	Victorian Upper Murray (Upper Hume region)	106.5	FM	ABC Goulburn Murray	National	
3MT	Omeo	0720	AM	ABC Gippsland	National	
3NE	Wangaratta	1566	AM	3NE	Commercial	
3NNN	Wangaratta	102.1	FM	Edge FM	Commercial	
3NOW	Melbourne North West Suburbs	098.9	FM	North West FM	Community	
3NRG	Sunbury	099.3	FM	3NRG	Community	
3OCR	Colac	098.3	FM	OCR FM	Community	
3ONE	Shepparton	098.5	FM	ONE FM	Community	
3PB	Victoria	various	AM	ABC NewsRadio	National	
3PBS	Melbourne	106.7	FM	PBS	Community	
3PFM	Bendigo City	106.7	FM	Phoenix FM	Community	
3PLS	Geelong	094.7	FM	The Pulse	Community	
3PNN	Victoria	various	FM	ABC NewsRadio	National	
3PTV	Melbourne	091.5	FM	Smooth FM	Commercial	
3PVR	Plenty Valley	088.6	FM	Plenty Valley FM	Community	
3RBA	Ballarat	102.3	FM	3BA	Commercial	
3REG	East Gippsland	090.7	FM	REG FM	Community	
3RIM	Melton	097.9	FM	979fm	Community	
3RMR	Mildura	097.9	FM	Triple M Sunraysia	Commercial	
3RN	Victoria	various	AM	ABC Radio National	National	
3RPC	Portland	099.3	FM	3RPC	Community	
3RPH	Melbourne	1179	AM	Vision Australia Radio	Community	
3RPP	Mornington	098.7	FM	RPP	Community	
3RRR	Melbourne	102.7	FM	Triple R	Community	
3RUM	Victorian Upper Murray (Upper Hume region)	088.7 & 107.7	FM	Radio Upper Murray	Community	
3SBSFM	Victoria	various	FM	SBS Radio	National	
3SCB	Melbourne Southern Suburbs	088.3	FM	Southern FM	Community	
3SEA	Warragul	094.3	FM	hit94.3/97.9 Gippsland	Commercial	
3SER	Melbourne South East Suburbs	097.7	FM	Casey Radio	Community	
3SEY	Seymour	103.9	FM	Seymour FM	Community	
3SFM	Swan Hill	099.1	FM	Smart FM	Community	
3SH	Swan Hill	1332	AM	3SH	Commercial	
3SHI	Swan Hill	107.7	FM	Mixx FM	Commercial	
3SPH	Shepparton	100.1	FM	Vision Australia Radio	Community	
3SR	Shepparton	1260	AM	RSN Racing & Sport	Commercial	
3SRR	Shepparton	095.3	FM	Triple M Goulburn Valley	Commercial	
3SUN	Shepparton	096.9	FM	hit96.9 Goulburn Valley	Commercial	
3SWR	Portland	096.9	FM	ABC South West Victoria	National	
3SYN	Melbourne	090.7	FM	SYN	Community	
3TFM	Sale	099.5	FM	TRFM	Commercial	
3TLR	Wodonga	098.5	FM	The Light	Community	
3TSC	Melbourne	089.9	FM	Light FM	Community	
3TTT	Melbourne	101.1	FM	KIIS 101.1	Commercial	
3UGE	Alexandra/Eildon	106.9	FM	UGFM	Community	
3UZ	Melbourne	0927	AM	RSN Racing & Sport	Commercial	
3VKV	Mount Beauty	096.5	FM	Alpine Radio	Community	
3VYV	Yarra Valley	099.1	FM	Yarra Valley FM	Community	
3WAY	Warrnambool	103.7	FM	3WAY FM	Community	
3WBC	Camberwell	094.1	FM	3WBC	Community	
3WL	Warrnambool	1602	AM	ABC South West Victoria	National	
3WM	Horsham	1089	AM	3WM	Commercial	
3WMA	Castlemaine	094.9	FM	Main FM	Community	
3WPR	Wangaratta	101.3	FM	OAK FM	Community	
3WTL	Bendigo City	105.1	FM	Life FM	Community	
3WV	Western Victoria	0594	AM	ABC Wimmera	National	
3WWM	Horsham	101.3	FM	Mixx FM	Commercial	
3WYN	Werribee	088.9	FM	WYN FM	Community	
3YB	Warrnambool	094.5	FM	3YB	Commercial	
3YFM	Warrnambool	095.3	FM	Coast FM	Commercial	
3ZZZ	Melbourne	092.3	FM	3ZZZ	Community	

== Defunct callsigns ==
Callsign	Area served	Freq.	Band	Fate	Freq currently	Purpose
3AB	Wodonga	0990	AM	Changed call to 3RN in 1991	3RN	National
3AR	Melbourne	0621	AM	Changed call to 3RN in 1991	3RN	National
3BA	Ballarat	1314	AM	Moved to FM in 1998 as 3RBA	3BT	Commercial
3BO	Bendigo	0945	AM	Moved to FM in 1993 as 3BBO	3UZ (HPON)	Commercial
3CCC	Bendigo	089.5	FM	Moved to 101.5 MHz and changed call to 3BBS in 2010	3PNN	Community
3CV	Charlton	1071	AM	Moved to Maryborough in the 1940s		Commercial
3CV	Maryborough/Bendigo	1071	AM	Remains on 1071 AM as Gold Central Victoria (3EL) and simulcast on FM from 1999 as 3BDG on 98.3 FM in Bendigo only.	3EL	Commercial
3DB	Melbourne	1026	AM	Changed call to 3TT in 1988	see 3TT	Commercial
3EON	Melbourne	092.3	FM	Moved to 105.1 MHz and changed call to 3MMM in 1988	3ZZZ	Commercial
3FUN	Sunbury	099.3	FM	Changed call to 3NRG in 2009	3NRG	Community
3GL	Geelong	1341	AM	Moved to FM in 1990 as 3CAT	3CW (HPON)	Commercial
3HS	Horsham	1370	AM	Shut down when 3LK started broadcasting in 1936	see 3LK	Commercial
3KZ	Melbourne	1179	AM	Moved to FM in 1990 as 3KKZ	3RPH	Commercial
3LK	Horsham	1089	AM	Changed call to 3WM sometime between 1976 and 1978	3WM	Commercial
3MA	Mildura	1467	AM	Moved to FM in 1997 as 3RMR	3ML	Commercial
3MB	Birchip	1500	AM	Shut down when 3CV started broadcasting in 1938	see 3CV	Commercial
3SR	Shepparton	1260	AM	Moved to FM in 1998 as 3SRR	3SR	Commercial
3TR	Trafalgar	1280	AM	Moved to Sale in the 1930s		Commercial
3TR	Sale	1242	AM	Moved to FM in 2002 as 3TFM	3GV	Commercial
3TT	Melbourne	1026	AM	Moved to FM in 1990 as 3TTT	3PB	Commercial
3UL	Warragul	0531	AM	Changed call to 3GG in 1989	3GG	Commercial
3WA	Wangaratta	0756	AM	Changed call to 3RN in 1991	3RN	National
3WR	Wangaratta		AM	Closed in 1925 after broadcasting for 12 months, reopened five years later		Commercial
3WR	Wangaratta		AM	Moved to Shepparton in 1934		Commercial
3WR	Shepparton		AM	Changed call to 3SR in 1937	see 3SR	Commercial
3WRB	Melbourne Western Suburbs	097.4	FM	Shut down in 2020	defunct	Community
3XY	Melbourne	1422	AM	Moved to 693 kHz and changed call to 3EE in 1992	3XY (HPON)	Commercial
3YYR	Geelong	100.3	FM	Moved to 94.7 MHz and changed call to 3PLS in 2003	3MEL	Community
3ZZ	Melbourne	1220	AM	Shut down in 1977	3EA (1224)	National
