= List of public broadcasters by country =

Media that have editorial independence from the state but may receive government funding

Public broadcasters have the editorial independence to serve the public interest above that of the ruling party.

== Africa ==
=== Algeria ===
- Public Establishment of Television

=== Angola ===
- Televisão Pública de Angola

=== Benin ===
- Société de radio et de télévision du Bénin

=== Botswana ===
- Botswana Television

=== Burkina Faso ===
- Radio Télévision du Burkina
- Sidwaya

=== Burundi ===
- Burundi National Radio and Television

=== Cameroon ===
- Cameroon Radio Television

=== Cape Verde ===
- RTC (Cape Verde)

=== Central African Republic ===
- Télévision Centrafricaine

=== Chad ===
- Télé Tchad

=== Côte d'Ivoire ===
- Société nouvelle de presse et d’édition de Côte d'Ivoire (SNPECI)

=== Djibouti ===
- Radio Television of Djibouti

=== Egypt ===
- National Media Authority

=== Equatorial Guinea ===
- TVGE

=== Eritrea ===
- Eri-TV

=== Eswatini ===
- Eswatini Broadcasting and Information Service

=== Ethiopia ===
- Ethiopian Broadcasting Corporation

=== Gabon ===
- Radio Télévision Gabonaise

=== The Gambia ===
- Gambia Radio & Television Service

=== Ghana ===
- Ghana Broadcasting Corporation

=== Guinea ===
- Radio Télévision Guinéenne

=== Guinea-Bissau ===
- Guinea-Bissau Television

=== Ivory Coast ===
- Radiodiffusion Television Ivoirienne

=== Kenya ===
- Kenya Broadcasting Corporation

=== Liberia ===
- Liberia National Television

=== Malawi ===
- Malawi Broadcasting Corporation

=== Mali ===
- Office de Radiodiffusion-Télévision du Mali

=== Mauritania ===
- Television of Mauritania

=== Mauritius ===
- Mauritius Broadcasting Corporation

=== Morocco ===
- SNRT

=== Mozambique ===
- Televisão de Moçambique

=== Namibia ===
- Namibian Broadcasting Corporation

=== Niger ===
- Office of Radio and Television of Niger

=== Nigeria ===
- Nigerian Television Authority

=== Republic of the Congo ===
- Télé Congo

=== Sahrawi Arab Democratic Republic ===
- RASD TV

=== São Tomé and Príncipe ===
- TVS

=== Senegal ===
- Radiodiffusion Télévision Sénégalaise

=== Seychelles ===
- Seychelles Broadcasting Corporation

=== Sierra Leone ===
- Sierra Leone Broadcasting Corporation

=== Somalia ===
- Somali National Television

=== Somaliland ===
- Somaliland National TV

=== South Africa ===
- SABC

=== South Sudan ===
- South Sudan Broadcasting Corporation

=== Sudan ===
- Sudan TV

=== Tanzania ===
- Tanzania Broadcasting Corporation

=== Togo ===
- Togolese Television

=== Tunisia ===
- Télévision Tunisienne

=== Uganda ===
- Uganda Broadcasting Corporation

=== Zambia ===
- Zambia National Broadcasting Corporation

=== Zimbabwe ===
- Zimbabwe Broadcasting Corporation

== Americas ==
=== Antigua & Barbuda ===
- Antigua Broadcasting Service

=== Argentina ===
- Televisión Pública

=== Bahamas, The commonwealth of ===
- Broadcasting Corporation of The Bahamas (BCB)
  - ZNS-TV
  - ZNS-1
  - ZNS-2
  - ZNS-3

=== Barbados ===
- Caribbean Broadcasting Corporation (CBC)

=== Bolivia ===
- Bolivia TV

=== Brazil ===
- TV Cultura
- Empresa Brasil de Comunicação (EBC)
  - TV Brasil
- Rede Minas
- Rádio USP

=== Canada ===
- Canadian Broadcasting Corporation — (National)
  - CBC Television
  - CBC News Network
  - CBC North
  - Documentary
  - Ici Radio-Canada Télé
  - Ici RDI
  - Ici ARTV
  - Ici Explora
  - CBC Radio One
  - CBC Music
  - CBC Radio 3 (no terrestrial broadcasting)
  - Ici Radio-Canada Première
  - Ici Musique
  - Radio Canada International (no terrestrial broadcasting; international broadcasting only)
  - CBC Parliamentary Television Network (former)
  - Bande à part (former)
  - Newsworld International (former; international broadcasting only)
  - Trio (former; international broadcasting only)
  - CBC-2 (proposed)
  - Télé-2 (proposed)
- Knowledge — British Columbia
- TVOntario — Ontario
- TFO — Ontario
- Télé-Québec — Quebec
- CFTU-DT — Montreal, Quebec (non-profit)
- CKUA Radio Network — Alberta (non-profit)
- CJRT-FM — Toronto, Ontario (non-profit)
- Access — Alberta (former)
- Saskatchewan Communications Network — Saskatchewan (former)

=== Colombia ===
- Señal Colombia

=== Costa Rica ===
- Canal 13 (Costa Rican TV channel)

=== Dominican Republic ===
- Corporación Estatal de Radio y Televisión

=== Greenland ===
- Kalaallit Nunaata Radioa
  - KNR1
  - KNR2

=== Guyana ===
- National Communications Network
  - NCN Television
  - Vybz 100.1 FM

=== Honduras ===
- Canal 8 (Honduran TV channel)

=== Jamaica ===
- Jamaica Broadcasting Corporation

=== Mexico ===
- Canal Catorce
- Canal 22
- Canal del Congreso
- Canal Once (Instituto Politécnico Nacional)
- TV UNAM (UNAM)
- Instituto Mexicano de la Radio
- Radio Educación
- Sistema Público de Radiodifusión del Estado Mexicano
- Sistema de Radiodifusoras Culturales Indígenas
- Canal 26 (Aguascalientes) (Aguascalientes)
- Canal 8 (Baja California Sur)
- Televisión y Radio de Campeche (Campeche)
- Canal 10 Chiapas (Chiapas)
- Canal 28 (Chihuahua)
- Capital 21 (Mexico City)
- Coahuila Televisión (Coahuila)
- Coahuila Radio (Coahuila)
- Canal 12 (Colima) (Colima)
- TV4 (Guanajuato) (Guanajuato)
- Radio y Televisión de Guerrero (Guerrero)
- Radio y Televisión de Hidalgo (Hidalgo)
- Jalisco TV (Jalisco)
- Mexiquense Televisión (State of Mexico)
- Sistema Michoacano de Radio y Televisión (Michoacan)
- Sistema Morelense de Radio y Televisión (Morelos)
- Sistema de Radio y Televisión de Nayarit (Nayarit)
- Radio y Televisión de Nuevo León (Nuevo León)
- CORTV (Oaxaca)
- SICOM Televisión (Puebla)
- Radio y Televisión Querétaro (Querétaro)
- Sistema Quintanarroense de Comunicación Social (Quintana Roo)
- Nueve TV (San Luis Potosi)
- Telemax (Sonora)
- Televisión Tabasqueña (Tabasco)
- Tlaxcala Televisión (Tlaxcala)
- TVMás (Veracruz)
- Tele Yucatán (Yucatán)
- SIZART (Zacatecas)

=== Peru ===
- TV Perú

=== Trinidad and Tobago ===
- Trinidad and Tobago Television (TTT)

=== United States ===
- Public Broadcasting Service (PBS) (TV; 1970)
  - PBS Kids 24/7 (TV; 2017)
  - MHz Networks (TV; 1972)
  - World (TV; 2005)
  - Create (TV; 2006)
- National Public Radio (NPR) (1970)
  - American Public Media (2004)
  - Public Radio International (1983)
  - Public Radio Exchange (2003)
  - New York Public Radio (1924)
  - Chicago Public Radio (April 1943)
  - Pacifica Radio (1949)
  - Boston Public Radio (1951)
  - Minnesota Public Radio (1967)

== Asia ==
=== Israel ===
Israeli Public Broadcasting Corporation

- Kan 11
- Makan 33
- Kan Educational
- Kan Tarbut
- Kan Bet
- Kan Gimel
- Kan 88
- Kan Kol Hamusica
- Kan Moreshet
- Kan Reka
- Radio Makan

=== Japan ===
- NHK (日本放送協会/Nippon Hōsō Kyōkai)
  - NHK General TV
  - NHK Educational TV
  - NHK BS
  - NHK BS Premium 4K
  - NHK BS8K
  - NHK AM
  - NHK FM
  - NHK World-Japan
  - NHK World Premium
  - NHK World Radio Japan

=== South Korea ===
- Korean Broadcasting System (KBS)
  - KBS1
  - KBS2
  - KBS News 24
  - KBS UHD
  - KBS Life
  - KBS Drama
  - KBS N Sports
  - KBS Joy
  - KBS Kids
  - KBS Story
  - KBS World
  - KBS Radio 1
  - KBS Radio 2
  - KBS Radio 3
  - KBS Classic FM
  - KBS Cool FM
  - KBS Hanminjok Radio
  - KBS World Radio
- Educational Broadcasting System (EBS)
  - EBS 1
  - EBS 2
  - EBS+1
  - EBS+2
  - EBS English
  - EBS Kids
  - EBS FM
- Arirang TV
- Yonhap News Agency
- Munhwa Broadcasting Corporation (MBC)
  - MBC TV
  - MBC Drama
  - MBC Sports+
  - MBC M
  - MBC every1
  - MBC ON
  - Channel M
  - MBC Standard FM
  - MBC FM4U

=== Taiwan ===
- Taiwan Broadcasting System (台灣公共廣播電視集團|TBS)
  - Public Television Service (公共電視 "公視"|PTS)
    - PTS Main Channel
    - PTS Taigi
    - PTS3
    - Hakka TV
    - TaiwanPlus
  - Chinese Television System (中華電視公司 "華視"; CTS)
    - CTS Main Channel
    - CTS Education, Sports and Culture
    - CTS News and Info
    - CTS Variety
- Radio Taiwan International (中央廣播電台|RTI)
- Central News Agency (中央社|CNA)

=== Thailand ===
- NBT
  - NBT 2HD
  - NBT Regional
  - NBT World
- Thai PBS
  - Thai PBS HD
  - ALTV
- Royal Thai Army
  - RTA 5
- Ministry of Tourism and Sports
  - T Sports 7
- National Assembly (Thailand)
  - TPTV
- MCOT Public Company Limited (commercial hybrid)
  - 9MCOT HD

== Europe ==
=== Austria ===
- ORF
  - ORF 1
  - ORF 2
  - ORF III
  - ORF Sport +

=== Belgium ===
- BRF — German-speaking Community of Belgium
- RTBF — Wallonia
- VRT — Flanders

=== Czech Republic ===
- Česká televize
  - ČT1
    - ČT1 JM - Southern Moravia
    - ČT1 SM - Northern Moravia
    - ČT1 JVC - Southeastern Bohemia
    - ČT1 SZC - Northwestern Bohemia
  - ČT2
  - ČT24
  - ČT sport
  - ČT :D
  - ČT art
- Český rozhlas

=== Denmark ===
- DR
  - DR1
  - DR2
  - DR P3
  - DR Minisjang
  - DR Ramasjang
  - DR Ultra
  - TVA Live
- TV 2 Danmark
  - TV 2
  - TV 2 Echo
  - TV 2 Charlie
  - TV 2 News
  - TV 2 Fri
  - TV 2 Sport
  - TV 2 Sport X

=== Estonia ===
- Eesti Rahvusringhääling
  - ETV
  - ETV2
  - ETV+

=== Finland ===
- YLE
  - YLE TV1
  - YLE TV2
  - YLE Teema & Fem

=== France ===
- France Télévisions
  - France 2
  - France 3
  - France 4
  - France 5
  - France Info
- Radio France
  - France Inter
  - France Info
  - France Culture
  - France Musique
  - FIP
  - Ici
  - Mouv'
- France Médias Monde
  - Radio France Internationale
  - France 24
- Arte

=== Germany ===
- ARD — working partnership of German public-service broadcasters
  - Westdeutscher Rundfunk — Cologne
  - Norddeutscher Rundfunk — Hamburg
  - Mitteldeutscher Rundfunk — Leipzig
  - Bayerischer Rundfunk — Munich
  - Südwestrundfunk — Stuttgart
  - Rundfunk Berlin-Brandenburg — Berlin
  - Hessischer Rundfunk — Frankfurt
  - Saarländischer Rundfunk — Saarbrücken
  - Radio Bremen — Bremen
- Deutsche Welle
- Deutschlandradio
- ZDF

=== Hungary ===
- Magyar Rádió és Televízió

=== Iceland ===
- RÚV

=== Ireland ===
- RTÉ
  - RTÉ One (SD, HD & +1)
  - RTÉ2 (SD, HD & +1)
  - RTÉ KIDSjr (SD)
  - RTÉ News (SD)
  - RTÉ Radio 1
  - RTÉ 2FM
  - RTÉ Lyric FM
  - RTÉ Raidió na Gaeltachta
  - RTÉ Gold
- TG4
  - TG4 (Irish language channel)
  - Cúla4 (kids service in Irish language)

Italy

RAI Radiotelevisione Italiana

=== Latvia ===
- LTV
  - LTV1
  - LTV7
- Latvian Radio

=== Liechtenstein ===
- Liechtensteinischer Rundfunk

=== Lithuania ===
- LRT
  - LRT televizija － General
  - LRT Plius － Culture, religion and sports
  - LRT Lituanica － Mix of LRT televizija and LRT Plius programmes
  - LRT Radijas (Radio station) － General and news
  - LRT Klasika (Radio station) － Culture and classical music
  - LRT Opus (Radio station) － Aimed for young people and modern music

=== Luxembourg ===
- Radio 100,7
- RTL Group S.A.
  - RTL Lëtzebuerg
  - RTL Zwee

=== Moldova ===
- Teleradio-Moldova
  - Moldova 1
  - Moldova 2
  - Radio Moldova
  - Radio Moldova Tineret
  - Radio Moldova Internațional (defunct)

=== Montenegro ===
- RTCG
  - TVCG 1
  - TVCG 2
  - TVCG 3
  - TVCG MNE – international
  - Radio Crne Gore
  - Radio 98 – youth-oriented

=== Netherlands ===
- Nederlandse Publieke Omroep
  - AVROTROS
  - BNNVARA
  - EO
  - Human
  - KRO-NCRV
  - MAX
  - NOS
  - NTR
  - ON!
  - PowNed
  - VPRO
  - WNL
  - ZWART
- RNW Media

=== Norway ===
- NRK
  - NRK1
  - NRK2
  - NRK3
  - NRK Super

=== Poland ===
- TVP – Telewizja Polska
  - TVP1
  - TVP2
  - TVP3 (local tv stations)
  - TVP World
  - Belsat (airing in Belarus)
- Polska Press
- Polskie Radio
  - Jedynka
  - Dwójka
  - Trójka

=== Portugal ===
- RTP
  - RTP1
  - RTP2
  - RTP Notícias
  - RTP Memória
  - RTP África
  - RTP Mundo
  - RTP Açores
  - RTP Madeira
  - RTP Antena 1
    - RTP Antena 1 Açores
    - RTP Antena 1 Madeira
  - RTP Antena 2
  - RTP Antena 3
    - RTP Antena 3 Madeira
  - RTP Mundo
  - RTP África
- Lusa News Agency

=== Slovenia ===
- RTVSLO
  - TV SLO 1
  - TV SLO 2
  - TV SLO 3
  - Prvi program
  - Val 202
  - ARS
  - TV Koper-Capodistria
  - TV Maribor

=== Spain ===
- Corporación de Radio y Televisión Española (RTVE)
- EFE
- Euskal Irrati Telebista (EiTB) – Basque Country
- Castilla-La Mancha Media – Castilla–La Mancha
- Corporació Valenciana de Mitjans de Comunicació – Valencia
- Ens Públic de Radiotelevisió de les Illes Balears – Balearic Islands
- Radiotelevisión de la Región de Murcia – Murcia
- Radiotelevisión del Principado de Asturias – Asturias
- Televisió de Catalunya – Catalonia

=== Sweden ===
- SR – Sveriges Radio
- SVT – Sveriges Television
  - SVT1
  - SVT2
  - SVT Barn
  - SVT24
  - Kunskapskanalen

=== Switzerland ===
- Swiss Broadcasting Corporation
  - SRF 1
  - SRF zwei
  - SRF info
  - RTS 1
  - RTS 2
  - RSI La 1
  - RSI La 2
  - Televisiun Rumantscha

=== Ukraine ===
- Public Broadcasting Company of Ukraine (Suspilne)
  - Pershyi
  - Ukrainian Radio

=== United Kingdom ===
- BBC
  - BBC One
  - BBC Two
  - BBC Three
  - BBC Four
  - BBC News
  - BBC Parliament
  - CBBC
  - CBeebies
  - BBC Scotland
  - BBC Alba
  - BBC Radio 1
  - BBC Radio 2
  - BBC Radio 3
  - BBC Radio 4
  - BBC Radio 5 Live
  - BBC Radio 1 Anthems
  - BBC Radio 1 Dance
  - BBC Radio 1Xtra
  - BBC Radio 3 Unwind
  - BBC Radio 4 Extra
  - BBC Radio 5 Sports Extra
  - BBC Radio 6 Music
  - BBC Asian Network – International broadcaster
  - CBeebies Radio
  - Live BBC News
  - BBC World Service
  - BBC Radio Scotland
  - BBC Radio nan Gàidheal
  - BBC Radio Shetland
  - BBC Radio Orkney
  - BBC Radio Wales
  - BBC Radio Cymru
  - BBC Radio Ulster
  - BBC Radio Foyle
  - BBC Local Radio — 40 stations
  - BBC Studios
    - BBC News
    - BBC Kids
    - BBC Lifestyle
    - BBC HD
    - BBC Earth
    - BBC Brit
    - BBC First
    - BBC World Service – International broadcaster
    - BBC America – International broadcaster
    - BBC UKTV
    - BBC Nordic – International broadcaster
    - BBC NL – International broadcaster
    - BBC Belgium – International broadcaster
    - UKTV
- Channel Four Television Corporation
  - Channel 4
  - Film4
  - E4
  - More4
  - 4Seven
  - E4 Extra
- S4C — Wales

=== Transnational ===
- 3sat — Germany/Austria/Switzerland
- Arte — France/Germany
- BVN — Flanders and Netherlands television

== Oceania ==
=== Australia ===
- Australian Broadcasting Corporation
  - ABC Television
    - ABC TV
      - ABC Canberra
      - ABD Darwin
      - ABN Sydney
      - ABQ Brisbane
      - ABS Adelaide
      - ABT Hobart
      - ABV Melbourne
      - ABW Perth
    - ABC Family/ABC Kids
    - ABC Entertains
    - ABC News
  - ABC Local Radio
    - ABC Radio Sydney (2BL)
    - ABC Radio Melbourne (3LO)
    - ABC Radio Brisbane (4QR)
    - ABC Radio Adelaide (5AN)
    - ABC Radio Perth (6WF)
    - ABC Radio Hobart (7ZR)
    - ABC Radio Canberra (2CN)
    - ABC Radio Darwin (8DDD)
    - ABC Broken Hill (2NB)
    - ABC Central Coast (2BL/T)
    - ABC Central West (2CR)
    - ABC Coffs Coast (2MMR)
    - ABC Illawarra (2ILA)
    - ABC Mid North Coast (2KP)
    - ABC New England North West (2NU)
    - ABC Newcastle (2NC)
    - ABC North Coast (2NNR)
    - ABC Riverina (2RVR)
    - ABC South East NSW (2BA)
    - ABC Upper Hunter (2UH)
    - ABC Western Plains (2WPR)
    - ABC Ballarat (3CRR)
    - ABC Central Victoria (3ABCRR)
    - ABC Gippsland (3GLR)
    - ABC Goulburn Murray (3MRR)
    - ABC Mildura Swan Hill (3MIL)
    - ABC Shepparton (3GVR)
    - ABC South West Victoria (3WL)
    - ABC Wimmera (3WV)
    - ABC Northern Tasmania (7NT)
    - ABC Capricornia (4RK)
    - ABC Gold Coast (4ABCRR)
    - ABC Far North (4QCC)
    - ABC North Queensland (4QN)
    - ABC North West Queensland (4ISA)
    - ABC Southern Queensland (4QS)
    - ABC Sunshine Coast (4SCR)
    - ABC Tropical North (4QAA)
    - ABC Western Queensland (4QL)
    - ABC Wide Bay (4QB)
    - ABC North & West SA (5CK)
    - ABC Eyre Peninsula (5LN)
    - ABC Riverland (5MV)
    - ABC South East SA (5MG)
    - ABC Goldfields (6ED, 6GF)
    - ABC Great Southern (6WA)
    - ABC Kimberley (6BE)
    - ABC Midwest & Wheatbelt (6GN)
    - ABC Pilbara (6KP)
    - ABC South Coast (6AL)
    - ABC South West WA (6BS)
    - ABC Alice Springs (8AL)
    - ABC Katherine (8ABCRR)
  - ABC Classic
  - ABC NewsRadio
  - Radio National
  - Triple J
  - ABC Jazz
  - ABC Country
  - ABC Grandstand
  - ABC Extra
  - ABC KIDS Listen
  - Double J
  - Triple J Unearthed
  - ABC Classic 2
  - ABC Australia
  - ABC Radio Australia
  - ABC iview
  - ABC Listen
- Special Broadcasting Service
  - SBS
  - SBS 2
  - SBS Food
  - SBS World Movies
  - NITV
  - SBS WorldWatch
  - SBS Radio
    - SBS Radio 1
    - SBS Radio 2
    - SBS Radio 3
    - SBS Arabic
    - SBS Chill
    - SBS PopAsia
    - SBS South Asian
  - SBS On Demand

=== Fiji ===
- Fijian Broadcasting Corporation (FBC)

=== New Zealand ===
- RNZ
  - RNZ National
  - RNZ Concert
  - RNZ Pacific
- Māori Television
  - Whakaata Māori
  - Te Reo
- TVNZ — six channels has commercial television and public television
  - TVNZ 1
  - TVNZ 2
  - TVNZ Duke
  - TVNZ 1+1
  - TVNZ 2+1
  - TVNZ Duke+1
- Pacific Media Network

==== Local networks ====
- Channel North Television
- CUETV
- Face TV — Auckland Region broadcaster
- TVHB

=== Samoa ===
- Samoa Broadcasting Corporation (SBC)

== Transcontinental ==
These broadcasters distribute across multiple continents.

- TV5Monde — France/Switzerland/Wallonia/Canada
  - TV5 Monde Style
  - TiVi5 Monde
  - TV5Monde Info
  - TV5 Québec Canada
  - TV5 Unis
- Arte

=== International broadcasters ===
- U.S. Agency for Global Media
  - Voice of America (1942)
  - Radio Free Europe/Radio Liberty (RFE/RL)
    - Current Time TV
  - Radio Free Asia (RFA)
  - Middle East Broadcasting Networks
    - Alhurra
    - Radio Sawa
  - Office of Cuba Broadcasting (Radio y Televisión Martí)
- Deutsche Welle
  - DW-TV
    - DW (English)
    - DW (Arabia)
    - DW (Español)
    - DW (Deutsch+)
    - DW (Deutsch)
- NHK
  - NHK World-Japan

== See also ==
- Independent media
- Nonprofit journalism
- Public service journalism
- List of radio stations receiving public funding
- World Press Freedom Index
