= Melomania (radio show) =

- Genre: Radio show
- Running time: 120 minutes
- Country of origin: Australia
- Language: English
- Home station: Connect FM Bordertown
- Syndicates: see below
- Hosted by: Scad & Hollie
- Announcer: Scad & Hollie
- Produced by: Scad
- Executive producer: Scad
- Original release: 2008 – 2020
- No. of series: 11
- No. of episodes: 625
- Audio format: Stereo
- Website: Melomania

Melomania was an Australian music radio show. First broadcast in 2008, it was based at Connect FM in Bordertown, South Australia, and syndicated to radio stations in Australia, New Zealand, Canada, Sweden and United Kingdom. It was hosted by Scad, Hollie and Troy, and features a variety of music genres, with a skew towards country music.

The show retired in 2020 as per an announcement on their Facebook page

"It has been mixed emotions at Melomania HQ as we have decided to retire the show. Melomania has always been a passion project that has aired weekly on radio stations around the world to promote new music, especially up and coming talent that you wouldn't necessarily hear anywhere else and ask questions that are of no benefit to anybody but nice to know all the same. It was not an easy decision to make as there have been so many wonderful friendships and opportunities made over the years with radio stations, distributors, musicians, male strippers, coaches, writers, producers, actors, record companies, promoters, managers, listeners, and the best co-host Mandy and Hollie could have ever asked for. Last not least thank you for listening over the years maybe sometimes confused and hopefully at times entertained. We will be airing our final program within the next few weeks with Scad, Hollie and Mandy as normal as possible...well for Melomania anyway. Until next time scadio/cya/wokka wokka, maybe not forever but for the time being. Final episode delivery on 23rd July."

The Facebook page has subsequently been deleted.

== Syndicates ==
=== New South Wales ===
- 2GCR FM103.3 Goulburn
- 2MIA Griffith
- 2GHR Greater Hume Radio Holbrook
- 91.1 Spirit FM Narrandera
- 2GRR Sydney
- TEM-FM Temora
- Sounds of the Mountains Tumut
- 94.5 Gold West Wyalong
- Ten FM Tenterfield

=== Victoria ===
- Voice FM 99.9 Ballarat
- Fresh FM Bendigo
- Radio EMFM Echuca/Moama
- OKR FM Kilmore
- Highlands FM Kyneton
- Hit Radio 87.6 Seymour
- OAK FM 101.3 Wangaratta
- Yarra Valley FM Woori Yallock

=== Queensland ===
- Switch 1197 Brisbane
- Wild Horse FM 99.7 Yarraman

=== South Australia ===
- 5YYY Whyalla
- Connect FM Bordertown, South Australia

=== Western Australia ===
- Bunbury Community Radio Bunbury
- Radio MAMA Carnavon, Geraldton
- Collie Community Radio 1089am Collie
