= River 1467 =

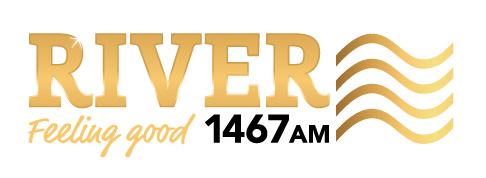

Mildura, Victoria; Australia
- Broadcast area: Sunraysia
- Frequency: AM: 1467 kHz
- Branding: River 1467

Programming
- Format: Easy listening

Ownership
- Owner: ARN; (Radio Central Victoria Pty Ltd)

History
- First air date: 1997 (as Easymix)
- Call sign meaning: MiLdura

Technical information
- Power: 2 kW
- Transmitter coordinates: 34.178667°S 142.122292°E

Links
- Website: www.river1467.com.au

River 1467 (official callsign: 3ML) is a commercial radio station owned and operated by Grant Broadcasters. The station is broadcast to the Sunraysia region located on the Victoria–New South Wales border from studios in Mildura.

The station launched in 1997 as Easymix 1467 by Elmie Investments, following 3MA's conversion to the FM band. On 15 June 2016, the station relaunched as River 1467.

In November 2021, River 1467, along with other stations owned by Grant Broadcasters, were acquired by the Australian Radio Network. This deal allows Grant's stations, including River 1467, to access ARN's iHeartRadio platform in regional areas. The deal was finalized on 4 January 2022. It is expected River 1467 will integrate with ARN's Pure Gold Network, but will retain its current name according to the press release from ARN.

== Programming ==
Local programming is produced and broadcast from the station's Mildura studios from 5.30am weekdays. The station's local output consists of a three-hour breakfast show presented by Dave Burrows, Feel Good Workdays with Damion Bradshaw. Additional locally branded programs are pre-recorded (i.e. not live) from the studios of Gold Central Victoria.

Syndicated programming includes Mornings with Tom Elliott, The Christian O'Connell Show, JAM Nation with Jonesy and Amanda.
