= North Central Victoria =

North Central
- Region
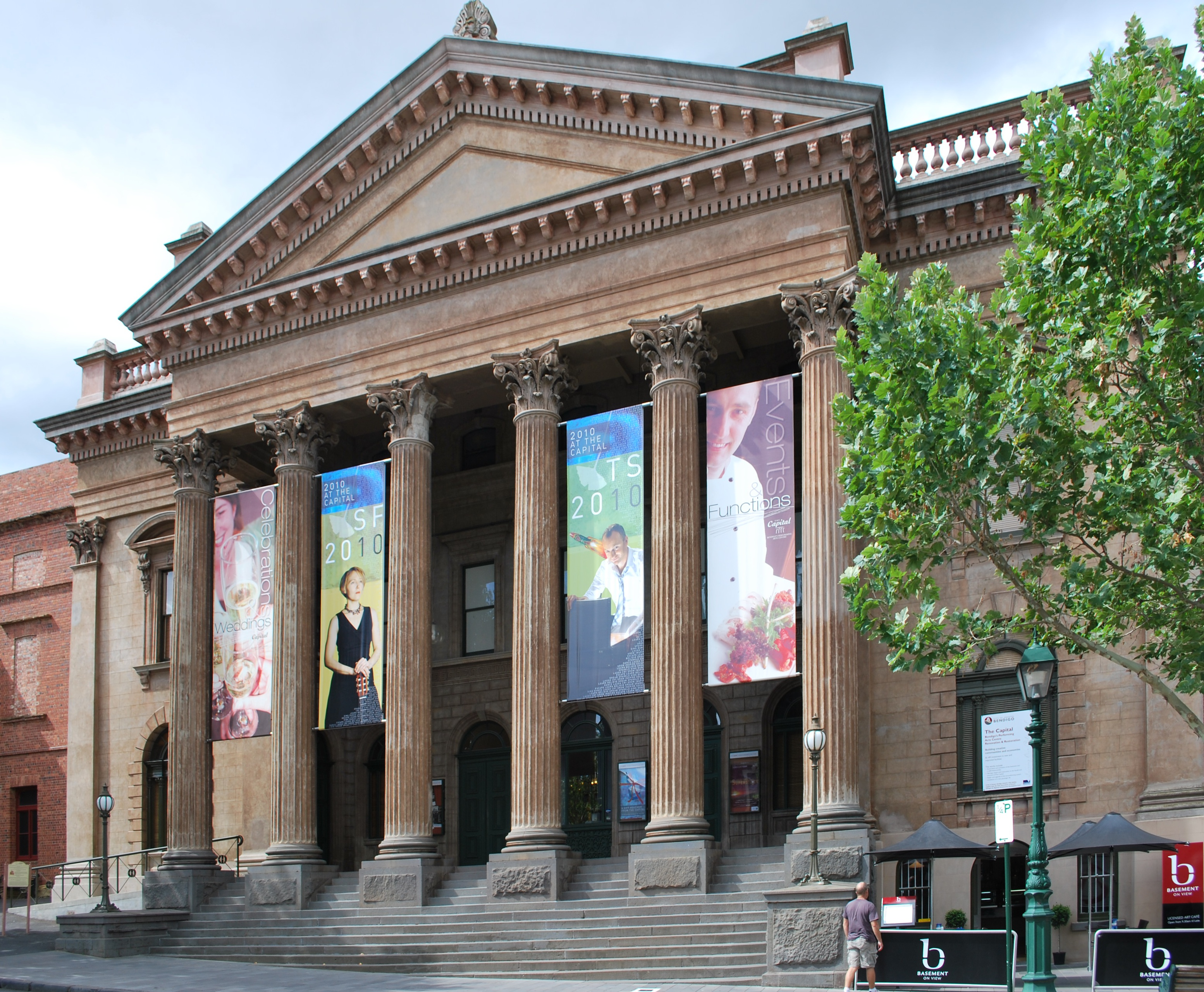
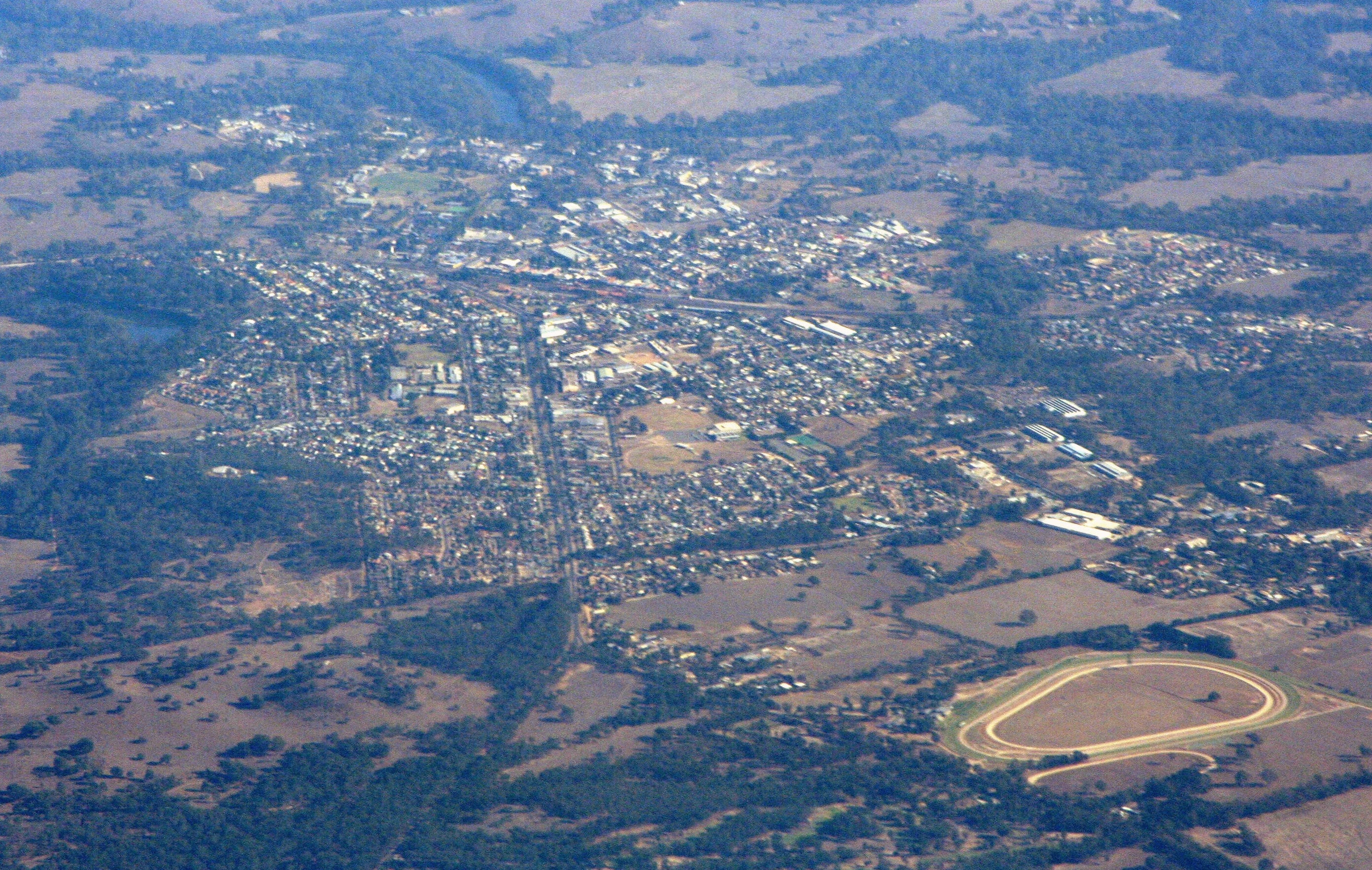
- Originally a Masonic Hall, now the Capital Theatre in Bendigo. An aerial view of Seymour showing Goulburn River to the left.

- Coordinates: 36°45′S 144°16′E
- Country: Australia
- State: Victoria
- LGA: (by population); Greater Bendigo; Macedon Ranges; Campaspe; Mount Alexander; Central Goldfields; Gannawarra; Loddon; Buloke
- Location: 150 km (93 mi) NW of Melbourne

Government
  - State electorate: Bendigo East; Bendigo West; Macedon; Ripon; Murray Plains
  - Federal division: Bendigo; Mallee (part); McEwen (part); Murray (part); Wannon (part)

Area
  - Total: 46,762 km^{2} (18,055 sq mi)

Population
  - Total: 249,660 (2016 census) (Note: Population figure is the combined population of all LGAs in the region)
  - Density: 5.33895/km^{2} (13.8278/sq mi)
- Time zone: UTC+10 (AEST)
  - Summer (DST): UTC+11 (AEDT)
Regions around North Central
Mallee	New South Wales	Hume
Mallee	North Central	Central Highlands
Wimmera	Greater Melbourne	Central Highlands

North Central Victoria is a rural region in the Australian state of Victoria. The region lies to the south of the Victorian/New South Wales border as defined by the Murray River, to the southwest of the Hume region, to the west of the Great Dividing Range contained within the Central Highlands and Victorian Alps, to the north of Greater Melbourne, to the northeast of the Wimmera, and to the east of the Mallee region.

As at the 2016 Australian census, the North Central region had a population of 249,660, representing the aggregate population of the eight local government areas that comprise the region.

== Location ==
Sustainability Victoria, a Victorian Government agency, defines North Central Victoria as the municipalities of Buloke, Gannawarra, Loddon, Campaspe, Central Goldfields, Mount Alexander, Macedon Ranges and the City of Greater Bendigo. A climate change study by La Trobe University also includes the Shire of Hepburn within the region.

The major urban centres are Bendigo, Castlemaine, Maryborough and Rochester. Smaller localities include Kyneton, Pyramid Hill, Kerang, Donald and Creswick. In 2002 the estimated population of North Central Victoria was 200,000.

== Administration ==
=== Political representation ===
For the purposes of Australian federal elections for the House of Representatives, the North Central region is contained within the Division of Bendigo, a southwestern portion of the Division of McEwen, the westernmost portion of the Division of Murray, the northeasternmost portion of the Division of Mallee, and the northeastern–most portion of the Division of Wannon,

For the purposes of Victorian elections for the Legislative Assembly, the North Central region is contained within the electoral districts of Bendigo East, Bendigo West, Macedon, Murray Plains and Ripon.

==== Local government areas ====
For administration purposes the region is divided into eight local government areas:

North Central region LGA populations
Local government area	Area		Population (2011 census)	Source(s)	Population (2016 census)	Source(s)
Local government area	km^{2}	sq mi	Population (2011 census)	Source(s)	Population (2016 census)	Source(s)
City of Greater Bendigo	3,048	1,177	100,617		110,477	
Buloke Shire	8,004	3,090	6,384		6,201	
Shire of Campaspe	1,280	490	36,365		37,061	
Central Goldfields Shire	20,941	8,085	12,496		12,995	
Gannawarra Shire	3,732	1,441	10,366		10,549	
Shire of Loddon	6,694	2,585	7,459		7,516	
Shire of Macedon Ranges	1,534	592	48,160		46,100	
Shire of Mount Alexander	1,529	590	17,591		18,761	
Totals	46,762	18,055	239,438		249,660	

=== Environmental protection ===
The North Central region contains the Greater Bendigo National Park, Gunbower National Park, Heathcote-Graytown National Park, and the Terrick Terrick National Park.

== Climate ==
The climate is moderate with wet winters and warm, dry summers. Annual rainfall ranges from 350 millimetres (14 in) near Swan Hill in the north, to over 1,200 millimetres (47 in) in the far southeast.

Temperatures are warm in summer, typically ranging from a maximum of 31 °C (88 °F) to a minimum of 14 °C (57 °F) in Kerang in the northwest and from 27 °C (81 °F) to 11 °C (52 °F) in the south. Winters are cool with minimum temperatures of 2–4 °C (36–39 °F) across the region.

== Natural resources ==
Natural resource management is administered by the North Central Catchment Management Authority covering 30,000 kilometres (19,000 mi) bounded by the Great Dividing Range, the Mount Carmel Ranges to the east and the New South Wales border to the north. This includes the management of rural water allocations and environmental protection for the Avon-Richardson, Avoca, Campaspe and Loddon rivers.

Regional water consumption for irrigation, stock and domestic use greatly exceeds local supply. Irrigation consumes an average 1.4 gigalitres (310×10^{6} imp gal; 370×10^{6} US gal) per annum, while domestic use consumes around 40,000 megalitres (8,800,000×10^{3} imp gal; 11,000,000×10^{3} US gal) per annum. More than 75% of regional water needs are met from water imports from the Goulburn Valley and upper Murray River catchments to the north and west.

An extensive network of natural lakes includes Lake Buloke (the terminus for the Avon-Richardson River), Lake Batyo Catyo near the town of Donald, and a northern network comprising Lakes Boort, Merna, Kangaroo, Charm, Lalbert and Boga. Groundwater beneath this northern lakes network supplies approximately 80% of Australia's mineral springs, supplying the bulk of domestically produced mineral water and providing substantial local employment.

== Land use ==
The predominant land use is agriculture, including sheep and cattle grazing and the production of cereals, grains and legumes. The gross value of agricultural output exceeds $0.8 billion a year. Forestry is also a major employer in the area surrounding the former gold rush towns of Creswick and Daylesford, with a substantial output of firewood, furniture timber and Eucalyptus oil.

Approximately 13% of the North Central catchment is public land, comprising flora reserves and state and national parks.

== Media ==
Radio stations that broadcast to the region are:

- ABC Central Victoria (part of ABC Local Radio)
- Hit91.9 (commercial)
- Triple M (commercial)
- Fresh FM serving Bendigo (community)
- Phoenix FM broadcast regional wide (community)
- EMFM serving Echuca and surrounding areas (community)
- MainFM 94.9 serving Castlemaine (community)

Network television is broadcast in the Bendigo region by the Seven Network, WIN Television (affiliated with the Nine Network), Network 10, the Australian Broadcasting Corporation (ABC) and the Special Broadcasting Service (SBS).

Of the three commercial networks, WIN Television airs a half-hour WIN News bulletin each weeknight at 5.30 pm, produced from a newsroom in the city and broadcast from studios in Wollongong.

Short local news updates and weather updates are broadcast by Network 10 throughout the day, produced and broadcast from its Hobart studios. The Seven Network airs short local news and weather updates throughout the day, produced and broadcast from its Canberra studios.
