= Phoenix FM (Central Victoria) =

Bendigo, Victoria, Australia; Australia
- Broadcast area: Central Victoria
- Frequency: 106.7 FM (repeater of ABC Central Victoria due to Victorian bushfires)

Programming
- Language: English
- Format: Community radio

Ownership
- Owner: Central Victorian Community Broadcasters Incorporated

History
- First air date: 7 January 2008
- Former frequencies: 89.5 FM
- Call sign meaning: 3 – Victoria; PFM – Phoenix FM

Links
- Website: Phoenix FM website

Phoenix FM, also known as Central Victorian Community Broadcasters Incorporated (CVCB), is an Australian community radio station based in Bendigo, Victoria.

== History ==
The inaugural meeting of Phoenix FM was held on 10 April 2007. Phoenix FM was granted a temporary licence for two weeks of test broadcasting from 7 January 2008. It was granted a second test broadcast period for two weeks from 8 to 21 June 2008. It was then granted a third test broadcast from 6pm on 28 September to midnight on 6 October 2008. A further extension to this was granted from October 2008 to March 2009 in a time-share arrangement with 89.5 Fresh FM. This occurred after a battle with the Australian Communications and Media Authority (ACMA), who were proposing to use the frequency used by both Phoenix FM and Fresh FM for political broadcasts.

Phoenix FM's first outside broadcast was a call of the Bendigo Pioneers game from Country Vet Oval, Golden Square. Phoenix FM began to stream their shows over the Internet in mid-2008.

Since June 2024, Phoenix FM's primary station, known as Studio One, broadcasts in FM analogue quality. The station decided to begin broadcasting using a digital desk from a $50,000 handout from the Victorian state government.

The station's second studio remains using an analogue system, and is currently being used for prerecording programs. The new digital studio was officially opened by Victorian premier Jacinta Allan in January 2025.

Committee member and technical adviser Peter Williams stated that the station's demographic is designed to be "as wide as [the station] can possibly make it". The non-profit station, run by volunteers, currently has membership of more than one hundred people.

== Presenters ==
Lewis Adams hosts "The New Local" with Stephen Wright. He also presents "Live History"

Mark Noulton and Joseph Johnston present "Generous Servings of Soup". Noulton also presents "Batcat"

Stephen Wright presents "The Shoe Draw Sideshow Funky Dance Time Hour".
