= Triple M Bendigo =

Triple M Bendigo (3BBO)
- Bendigo, Victoria; Australia
- Broadcast area: Central Victoria
- Frequency: 93.5 MHz
- RDS: MMM93.5

Programming
- Format: Mainstream rock
- Network: Triple M

Ownership
- Owner: Southern Cross Austereo; (Radio 3BO Pty Ltd)
- Sister stations: Hit91.9 Bendigo

History
- First air date: 4 June 1931 (as 3BO)
- Former call signs: 3BO (1931–1993)
- Former frequencies: AM: 960 kHz (1931–1978); AM: 945 kHz (1978–1993)
- Call sign meaning: Derived from former callsign 3BO – Bendigo

Technical information
- Licensing authority: ACMA
- ERP: 120 kW
- Transmitter coordinates: 36.992211°S 144.308331°E

Links
- Public licence information: Profile
- Website: www.triplem.com.au/bendigo

Triple M Bendigo (official callsign: 3BBO) is a commercial radio station owned and operated by Southern Cross Austereo as part of the Triple M network. It broadcasts to Central Victoria from studios in the Bendigo suburb of Golden Square.

The station was founded in 1931 by AWA as 3BO, initially on the AM band at a frequency of 960 kilohertz, before converting to the FM band as 3BO FM on 5 April 1993. In 1987 it was sold by AWA to Wesgo. It was sold again in 1993 to Broadcast Media Group, and to DMG Regional Radio in 1996.

On 15 December 2016, it was rebranded Triple M.

Triple M's Golden Square studios produce and air local programs from 6 am–10 am weekdays, including a four-hour breakfast show presented by Bryan Coghlan and Jules Greenhalf. Network programming comes from studios in Albury, the Gold Coast, Melbourne and Sydney.

On the 9 January 2026, Triple M Bendigo’s transmitter at Mount Alexander was damaged during the Victorian bushfires, causing the station to go off air terrestrially. This also caused sister station Hit91.9 to go off air, as well as ABC Central Victoria and all digital TV services.
