= 3CRR =

3CRR may refer to:

- Third Cambridge Catalogue of Radio Sources, revised edition
- Radio station ABC Ballarat, callsign 3CRR
