= Connect FM =

Connect FM may refer to:

- Connect Radio 97.2 & 107.4, a commercial radio station in the United Kingdom
- The branding for two Canadian ethnic radio stations owned by Akash Broadcasting Inc.:
  - CJCN-FM (91.5 FM) in Surrey, British Columbia
  - CKER-FM (101.7 FM) in Edmonton, Alberta
- Bankstown-Auburn Community Radio (100.9 FM) in Bankstown, New South Wales, Australia
- Connect FM (South Australia), a radio station in Bordertown, South Australia; home station of the program Melomania
