= Hit91.9 Bendigo =

hit91.9 Bendigo (3BDG)
- Bendigo, Victoria; Australia
- Broadcast area: Central Victoria
- Frequency: FM: 91.9 MHz
- RDS: hit91.9
- Branding: hit91.9

Programming
- Format: Contemporary hit radio
- Network: Hit Network

Ownership
- Owner: Southern Cross Austereo; (Radio 3CV Pty Ltd)
- Sister stations: Triple M Bendigo

History
- First air date: 8 October 1999 (as Star FM)
- Call sign meaning: Bendigo

Technical information
- ERP: 120 kW
- Transmitter coordinates: 36.992211°S 144.308331°E

Links
- Website: www.hit.com.au/bendigo

hit91.9 Bendigo (official callsign: 3BDG) is a commercial radio station owned and operated by Southern Cross Austereo as part of the Hit Network. The station is broadcast to Central Victoria from studios in the Bendigo suburb of Golden Square.

The station commenced broadcasting in 1999 as 91.9 Star FM when 3CV, a Maryborough-based station, obtained a supplementary FM licence. On 15 December 2016, the station was relaunched as Hit91.9.

On the 9 January 2026, Hit91.9 Bendigo’s transmitter at Mount Alexander was damaged during the Victorian bushfires, causing the station to go off air terrestrially. This also caused sister station Triple M 93.5 to go off air, as well as ABC Central Victoria and all digital TV services.

== Programming ==
Local programming is produced and broadcast from the station's Golden Square studios from 9 am–12 pm weekdays, consisting of a three-hour mornings show presented by Ed Thomas.

Networked programming originates from studios in Albury, Melbourne and Sydney.
