= Tiny Giants =

Australian band

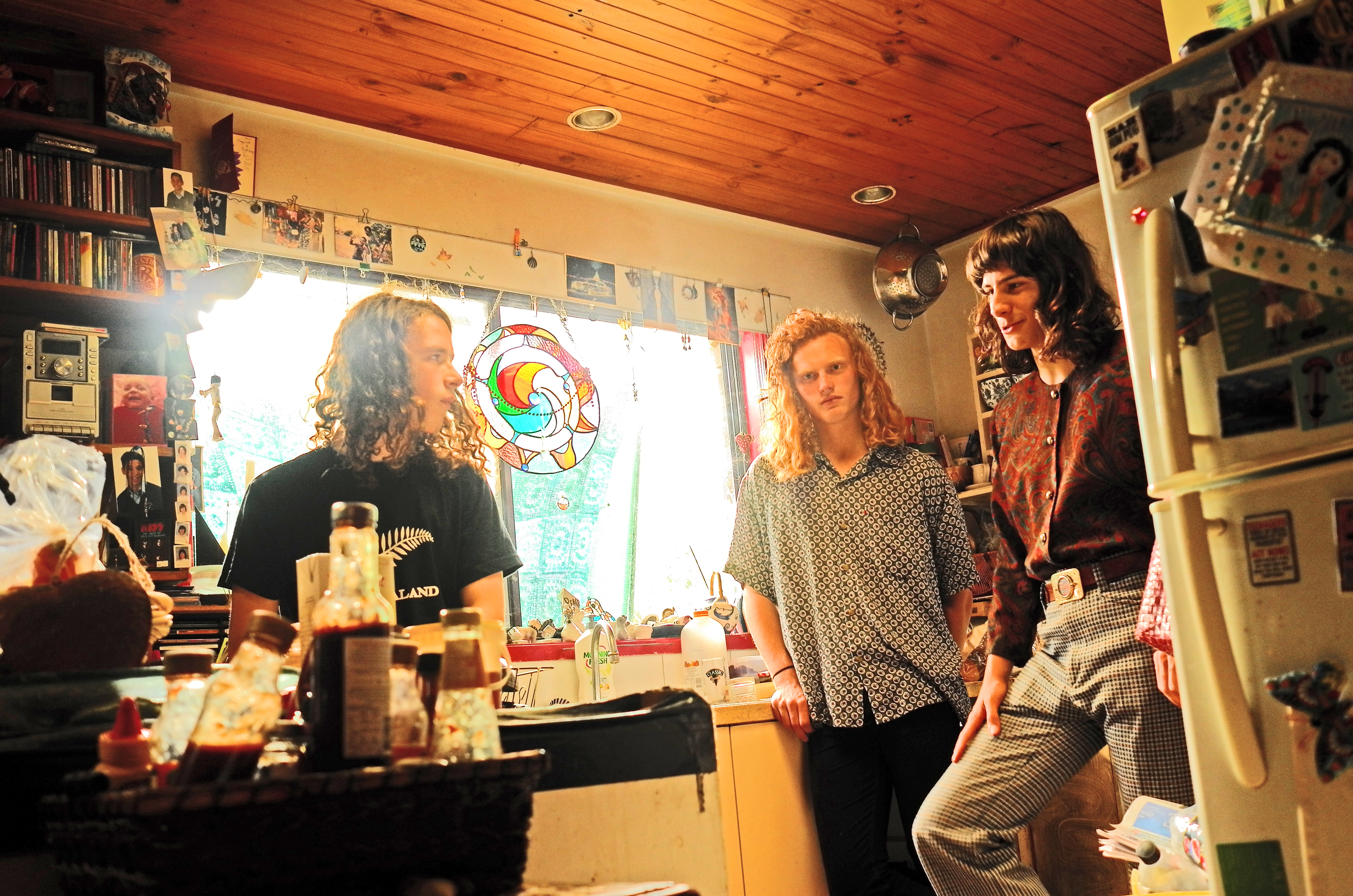
- L to R - Etienne Mantelli, Jasper Jolley, George Carroll Wilson

Background information
- Origin: Ocean Grove, Australia
- Genres: Garage rock; psychedelic rock; blues rock; surf rock
- Years active: 2010–2019
- Label: Dare Records
- Members: Jasper Jolley; Etienne Mantelli; George Carroll Wilson
- Website: thetinygiants.bandcamp.com//

Tiny Giants are an Australian garage rock band from Ocean Grove Victoria, formed late 2010 under the pseudonym "The Flaming Jets". They became "The Tiny Giants" in early 2011 and released two EP's under this name before changing to "Tiny Giants" for the release of their debut album. The band consists of Jasper Jolley (Guitar, Vocals), Etienne Mantelli (Bass, Drums, Guitar, Vocals) and George Carroll Wilson (Drums, Bass, Vocals).

== History ==
=== The Flaming Jets (2010-2011) ===
The band initially formed after Etienne Mantelli met Jasper Jolley and George Carroll Wilson outside of local Ocean Grove venue "The Piping Hot Chicken Shop". They originally formed under the name "The Flaming Jets" as the boys were only 12/13 and thought it was cool. No official performances were done under this name although a few number of band practices were done and a poster was even made for the band by one of their mothers.

=== The Tiny Giants (2012) ===
In early to mid 2011 the band changed their name to "The Tiny Giants" on the suggestion of drummer George Carroll Wilson's brother, Fenn Wilson. The band began to play live shows under this name and released two EP's. Their self-titled debut EP came out in late 2012 and was self released. They only made a short run of 50 CD's and they sold out shortly after their 2nd release. The EP was recorded at 94.7 The Pulse and was produced by Beau Torrence of The Rustys. The EP was well received and was a big achievement for the band as they were only 13.

=== INXS: Never Tear Us Apart (2013) ===
In 2013 the band was approached by Mark Opitz to record music for the Australian mini series INXS: Never Tear Us Apart about Australian Rock band INXS. The band worked with Colin Wynn and Mark Opitz to record in Wynn's studio for the series. In return for their work they were offered $500 cash or two days recording with Wynn plus mixing. They chose to record and began recording their 2nd EP.

=== Blunt Slippy (2013) ===
After their first release the band began to find their sound and released their second EP "Blunt Slippy". This was their first proper studio recording. The EP was named after drummer George Carroll Wilson was trying to say the names of bands Blink 182 and Slipknot but instead said a combination of the two. The name stuck. The cover art was made in the studio by bassist Etienne Mantelli out of a dreadlock from guitarist Jasper Jolley that had recently been pulled out. The reason for the photo being blue was the odd lighting mixed with a crappy Instagram filter that was popular at the time. The band released the EP at Queenscliff Music Festival. The EP was well received and got some media attention, having online articles commending it. The articles were written early 2014 and promoted their upcoming debut album.

=== You're Too Excitable (2014) ===
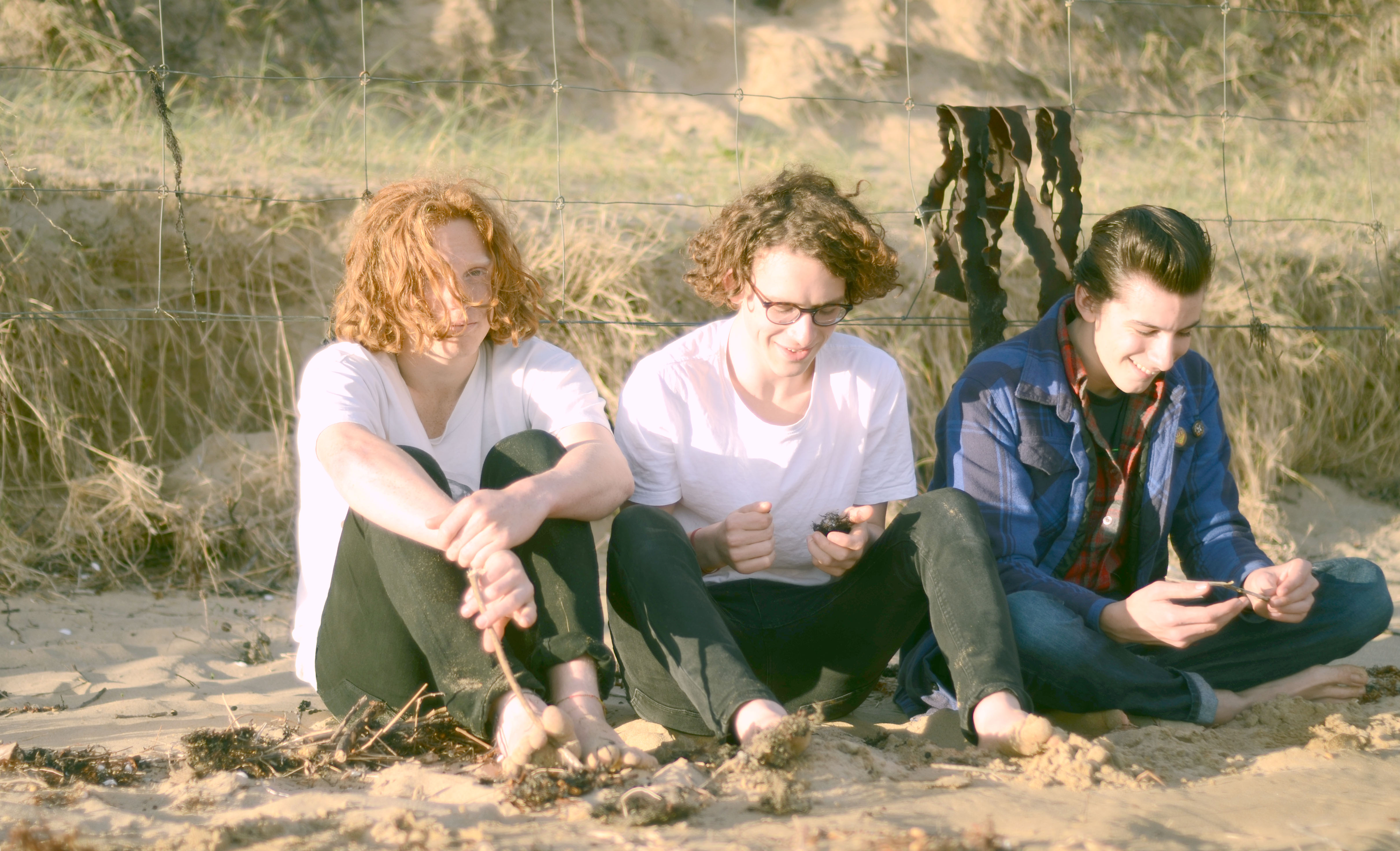
Tiny Giants after recording the music video for 'Paranoid'

Their debut album was announced with the release of the single Cage. The song was premiered on Triple J Unearthed and was on rotation on Triple J. This single was soon followed with the single 'Paranoid' accompanied by a music video by Willem Kingma. This music video was released under the name "The Tiny Giants" however the album was released under the name "Tiny Giants". Before this decision the band contemplated yet another name change and were heavily considering changing their name to "The Dare Ohhs" but eventually decided to stick with "The Tiny Giants" but to drop "The" from the beginning and just be "Tiny Giants". This album was well received and sold out completely shortly after their second album was released. This was the first album completely home recorded in Jasper Jolley’s living room.

=== INNUEN//DOS (2015) ===
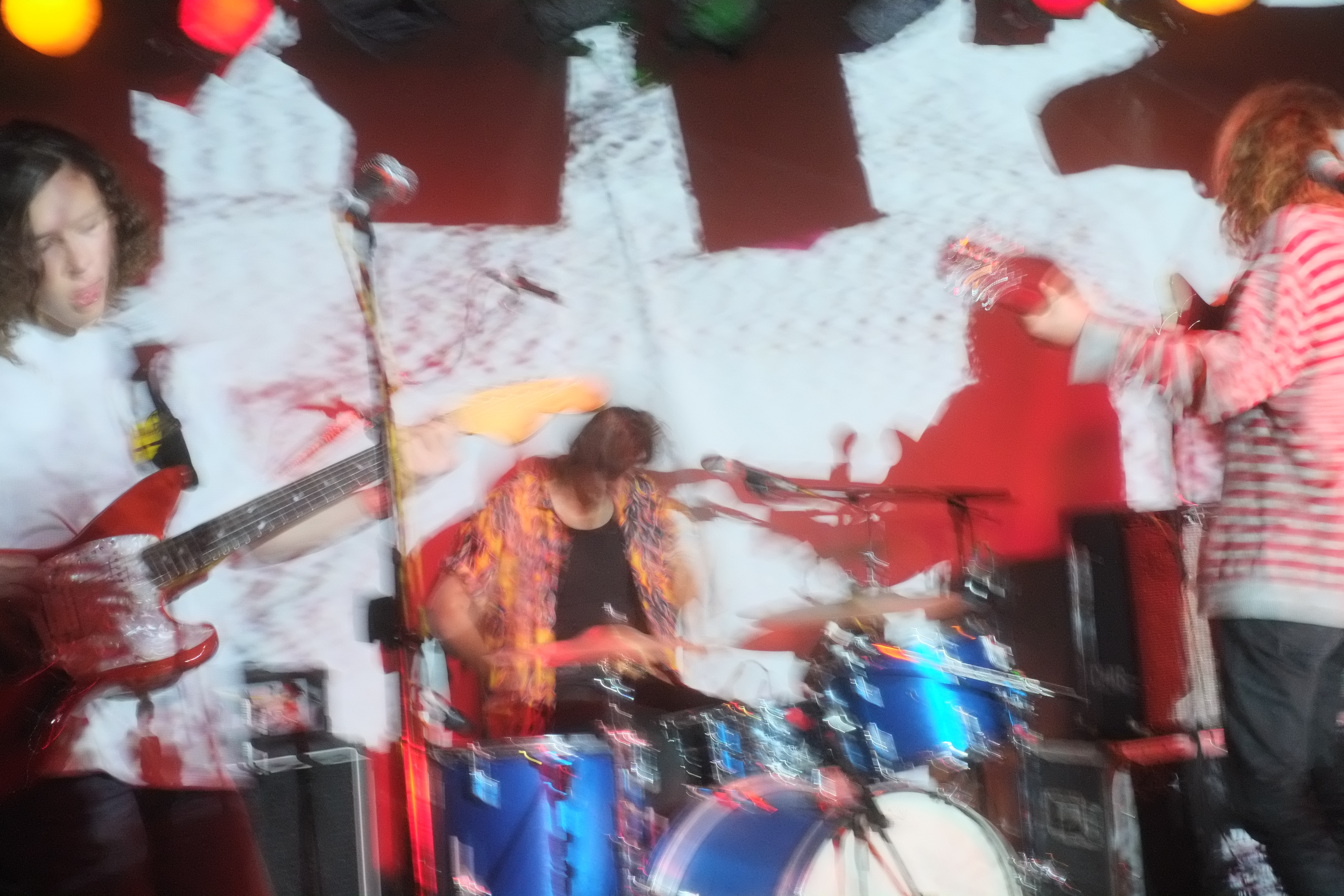
Tiny Giants at Gizzfest 2015

In April 2015 the band began recording their second album "INNUEN//DOS" once again in Jasper Jolley's living room. Having recorded their previous album in the same place, they had a bit of experience when making this record. They experimented with tracks featuring a second guitar played by Etienne Mantelli, instead of the usual bass guitar. They also experimented with the use of flute and vocal harmonies and they were featured more than in their previous records. The album was much more a Psych Rock album than it was Garage Rock, heavily drenched in delay and reverb. This was also the first album to feature 12 string guitar, further adding to the Psychedelic sound. The album was mixed by Paul Maybury, giving the songs a thicker sound as they were better produced. Around the same time as recording this album Tiny Giants played at the first Gizzfest, put on by Melbourne Psych Rock band King Gizzard and the Lizard Wizard. They also were welcomed back to Queenscliff Music Festival for a second year. The band played regular shows in pubs and clubs in Melbourne, migrating north to the big smoke from their beach town of Ocean Grove, starting to properly build a following.

=== Riverside (2016) ===
The band began recording their third album early 2016 with sound engineer/producer Paul Maybury at his studio in Thornbury. This was their first album to feature instruments such as the Sitar (Jasper Jolley), Cello (Etienne Mantelli) and Koto (George Carroll Wilson).

== Band members ==
- Jasper Jolley – lead vocals, guitar, harmonica, flute, piano, percussion
- Etienne Mantelli – bass guitar, drums, backing vocals, guitar, piano, percussion
- George Carroll Wilson - drums, bass guitar, backing vocals, guitar, piano, organ, percussion

== Discography ==
=== EP's ===
- The Tiny Giants (2012)
- Blunt Slippy (2013)

=== Albums ===
- You're too excitable (2014)
- Innuen//dos (2015)
- Riverside (2016)

== Pollyman ==
In 2019, George Carroll Wilson released his debut single as Pollyman, "Japanese Rock and Roll" on the Bonsai Records label, with the project becoming a trio when his brother Fenn Wilson joined alongside Alister Hull.
