= National TV =

National TV may refer to:

- Nine Network, an Australian commercial network formerly known as National Television Network
- Bulgarian National Television
- National Television of Cambodia
- Televisión Nacional de Chile
- Național TV (Romania)

== See also ==
- Public broadcasting, media operated as a public service, and often financed by public funds
- State media, media outlets that have no editorial independence from the state or government
- List of public broadcasters by country
- List of television networks by country
