= Ten FM =

TEN FM
Tenterfield, New South Wales; Australia
- Broadcast area: New England (NSW) & Granite Belt (QLD)
- Frequency: 89.7 MHz FM

Programming
- Format: community programming

Ownership
- Owner: CBAA; (Tenterfield Community Radio Inc.)

History
- First air date: 1983
- Former call signs: 2TEN
- Call sign meaning: TENterfield FM

Technical information
- Repeater: 98.7 MHz FM

Links
- Website: www.tenfm.org.au

Ten FM is a local community radio station broadcasting from Tenterfield, New South Wales.

== Background ==
The station broadcasts throughout the local area, including north across the Queensland border.

This community station was opened in the early 1980s and has since changed its name from 2TEN FM to TEN FM, dropping the "2" because of the extended service area into Queensland.

Towns in NSW in the Ten FM coverage area include Tenterfield, Jennings, Legume, Yetman, Urbenville, Glen Innes, Tabulam, Woodenbong, Bonshaw, Drake and Deepwater.

The areas of Queensland the station broadcasts to include Texas, Stanthorpe, Ballandean and Wallangarra.

In April 2016, more than $5000 of funding was awarded to Ten FM after the station applied for a government grant. The grant was expected to be used for the installation air-conditioning and for the purchase of computer protection software.

The community station transmits on an FM frequency of 89.7 MHz with a 4 kW transmitter located on Mt Mackenzie, 8 km south west of Tenterfield NSW and on 98.7 MHz with a low power (100W) transmitter situated on Mt Marlay, on the outskirts of Stanthorpe QLD.

In July 2016, Member for Lismore Thomas George announced that Ten FM would be receiving a $5000 grant to install an additional relay tower at Drake enabling the station to provide more reliable coverage for the Drake area.

The station uses StationPlaylist Pro automation software for live-to-air broadcasting while using the Adobe Audition program for additional production and Studio one software for production. An Elan mixer, Lenovo on-air computer, Marantz & Denon CD players, and Bowers & Wilkins studio monitors make up the broadcast equipment used by the announcers in the studio.

In August 2014, Ten FM was one of 92 groups across New South Wales to receive funding from a community grants scheme funded by NRMA. The station were expected to use the funding to purchase a back-up generator to ensure the station can operate in the event of a power failure. A brownout in the town three years prior caused serious damage to Ten FM's electronic equipment which ended up costing the station $15,000.

== Staff and Programming ==
The station employs three paid staff member, responsible for sales, production and management. The remaining staff members are all volunteers who range in age from 14 to 70.

A number of Ten FM announcers have been profiled in the local media for their work with the community radio station.

In 2013, a long-term volunteer was recognised during Volunteer Week by Ten FM and the Tenterfield Shire mayor for being a volunteer for 24 years and in 2015, a visually-impaired Ten FM announcer was acknowledged for volunteering at the station for 25 years.

Ten FM's programming consists of predominantly local, community-orientated entertainment programs hosted by local residents from the area. The station's local programming is complemented by some syndicated weekly shows such as Rick Dees Weekly Top 40, the Hot 25 Countdown and Melomania.

A regularly updated program guide is published on the Ten FM website.

== Frequencies ==
- Tenterfield 89.7
- Stanthorpe 98.7 & 89.7
- Texas 89.7
- Urbenville 89.7
- Mingoola 89.7
- Wallangarra 89.7
- Yetman 89.7
- Jennings 89.7
- Ballandean 98.7
- Drake 89.7
- Bolivia 89.7
