= Southern FM =

Southern FM may refer to:

- Heart Sussex, previously known as "Southern FM", in England
- 88.3 Southern FM, in Melbourne, Australia
