= Apple FM =

Apple FM (3APL)
- Bacchus Marsh, Victoria; Australia
- Broadcast area: Bacchus Marsh RA1
- Frequency: FM: 98.5 MHz

Programming
- Language: English
- Format: Community radio

Ownership
- Owner: Bacchus Marsh Community Radio Inc

History
- Founded: 1986
- First air date: 2001
- Call sign meaning: APpLe

Technical information
- Licensing authority: ACMA
- ERP: 400 W
- Transmitter coordinates: 37.689181°S 144.377036°E

Links
- Public licence information: Profile
- Webcast: Listen Live
- Website: apple985fm.com.au

Apple 98.5FM (official call sign 3APL) is a community radio station licensed to Bacchus Marsh, Victoria.

== History ==
The first test broadcast of this station in October 1986 coincided with the celebrations for the 150th year since the founding of Bacchus Marsh township. The original frequency offered was 94.7FM with call sign 3APL. One week only was granted for broadcasting. The ‘studio’ was in the garage of a real estate office in Underbank.

The station's establishment followed the dedicated and energetic efforts of founding member David Steele, a Bacchus Marsh resident and radio broadcasting enthusiast, who had invited expressions of interest in a local newspaper advertisement.

With the assistance of a team of 20 plus willing volunteers, donated equipment and funds, the station underwent many changes in venue:- the local grammar school, the community centre, the local post office, the public hall, a Main Street building above a chemist, an annex of the Montessori kindergarten in Darley to the current home, the Community Hub, thanks to the support of the Moorabool council.

After various test broadcasts of 2 weeks, 3 times per year, it was not until 2001 that a full license was granted to Apple 98.5FM with 200+ members. Even then, broadcasting times were limited.

Apple 98.5FM is also involved in various local community projects and festivals. The local Ballarat League Football competition is a major draw card on the station’s calendar, with hundreds tuning in yearly to catch Apple’s live play by play commentary of both the Darley Devils and Bacchus Marsh Cobras during football season. The station now has a professional development strategy for presenters and will also provide training in radio programming and presentation to prospective local students.

On 12 May 2026, Apple FM announced that it would cease broadcasting on 5 July 2026.

The Closing of Apple FM was prevented, by a new committee forming to work to keeping local community radio alive.

== Notable alumni ==
- Claire Stuchbery, host of "Firewater" on PBS 106.7FM Melbourne
- Matilda Marozzi, journalist and producer at ABC Radio Melbourne
- Michael Clough, commentator for Foxtel's broadcasts of the Australian Ice Hockey League
