= 96.5 Inner FM =

Radio station in Heidelberg, Victoria

96.5 Inner FM (3INR)
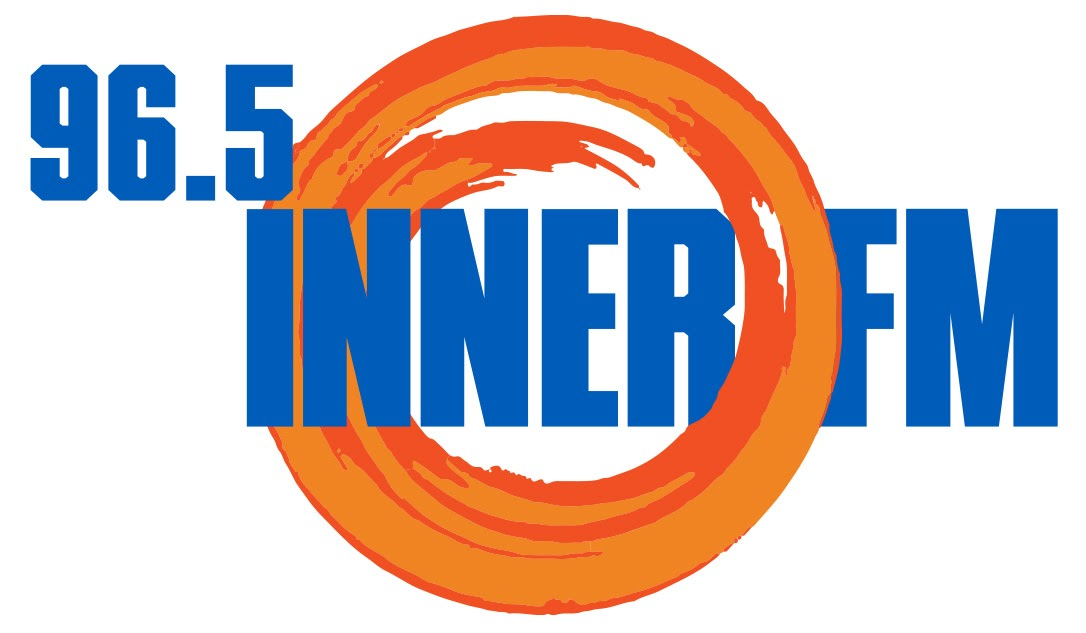

Heidelberg, Victoria; Australia
- Broadcast area: Melbourne North East RA1
- Frequency: FM: 96.5 MHz

Programming
- Format: Community radio

Ownership
- Owner: Inner North Eastern Community Radio Inc

History
- Founded: 1987
- First air date: 10 December 1990
- Call sign meaning: INneR

Technical information
- Licensing authority: ACMA
- ERP: 200 W
- Transmitter coordinates: 37.756675°S 145.056915°E

Links
- Public licence information: Profile
- Webcast: Listen Live
- Website: innerfm.org.au

96.5 Inner FM (official call sign 3INR) is a community radio station in Melbourne, Victoria, Australia.

== Profile ==
96.5 Inner FM broadcasts on a frequency of 96.5 MHz. Its main coverage area is the inner north eastern suburbs of Melbourne. Its format consists of largely of easy listening / nostalgic music, and community programs.

The studios of Inner FM are located at Warringal Shopping Centre (formerly called Centro Warringal) in Burgundy St, Heidelberg. The transmitter is at the Austin Hospital, with signal transmission between station and transmitter achieved by an analogue "line-of-sight" UHF link at a frequency of 847 MHz. For more about this link, see these links here.

Inner FM is staffed by non-paid volunteers, who are involved in all aspects of running the station. Overall management rests with a committee elected by the members. (This is in accord with the proper form for an Incorporated Not-For-Profit association, constituted under the Associations Incorporations Act 1981 (Victoria).)

Inner FM broadcasts 24 hours a day, seven days a week. The format is a mixture of magazine-style and music programmes, with an intention to appeal to all tastes and age groups. As of August 2024, live broadcasting is from 6 am to midnight, with pre-recorded programs overnight on weeknights.

Inner FM can also be listened to through a live audio stream, accessible via the station's website.

A survey conducted by the Department of Transport and Communications in 1992 showed a 40% overall awareness of community radio, and a survey conducted by Ramsay Research at the same time, showed a local listening base of 8.6%.

Inner FM is listed as one of the "Official media" by the Banyule City Council.

== History – Outer and Inner North East Radio ==
96.5 Inner FM's logo, prior to an update in the 2010s

Inner FM is the result of a change to an initially proposed plan for a number of sub-metropolitan community radio stations. The initial plan for the North Eastern Melbourne area was for one radio station service area covering both the Heidelberg area and the Plenty Valley area.

The initial community radio group was formed as North Eastern Radio, with an office in the Plenty Valley area. Subsequent to their first trial broadcasts, a new group was established in the inner most part of the original service area. The new group cited differences in community make-up and population age as the primary reasons for the formation of the new group.

The (then) Australian Broadcasting Authority later agreed to divide the original North East Melbourne service area into an Inner North Eastern region and an Outer North Eastern region. The original North Eastern Radio became "ONE FM" (Outer North East) (Now Plenty Valley FM) and "INR" (Now Inner FM) became the operator in the Inner North eastern portion of the original service area.

== Inner FM Start Up ==
Inner FM began life in November 1987 when a group of local residents held a meeting to discuss the formation of a community radio station in the North Eastern region of Melbourne. Several of these members are still current presenters on Inner FM.

The first test broadcast period of what was then known as North East Community Radio was conducted in late February and early March 1988 from the Heidelberg Town Hall. This test broadcast lasted for one week. A second week-long test broadcast was conducted during July 1988.

In March 1990, as part of a process of licensing eight sub-metropolitan community radio stations, Inner North East Community Radio was granted a "C" (General Community) class licence by the Australian Broadcasting Tribunal.

It wasn't until December 1990 the Department of Transport and Communications finished conducting further test broadcasts, and the station started regular broadcasts on 10 December 1990.

The station commenced live "streaming" via internet in late 2008.

== Programs ==
Inner FM does not operate with a playlisted music presentation. The station has maintained a "program based" presentation. This features many volunteers presenting a weekly (in most cases) one- to three-hour radio program featuring music they themselves prefer to broadcast, or programs structured around talk and interview segments.

Programs are interspersed with community sponsors and public service announcements, and can be listened to live through the FM frequency as well as through an Internet Radio broadcast. In recent years, more programs at Inner FM have opted to publish as weekly podcasts.

"Speciality music" programming takes place after 18:00 hrs. (6 in the evening), with programs devoted to a wide range of musical styles and demographics. Under 96.5 Inner FM's "lifestyle" programming, shows such as Scouting Around and That's Entertainment have remained on air since the beginnings of the station.
