= Triple M Sunraysia =

Mildura, Victoria; Australia
- Broadcast area: Sunraysia
- Frequency: FM: 97.9 MHz
- Branding: 97.9 Triple M

Programming
- Format: Mainstream rock
- Network: Triple M

Ownership
- Owner: Southern Cross Austereo; (Radio 3MA Pty Ltd)
- Sister stations: Hit99.5 Sunraysia

History
- First air date: 25 May 1933 (as 3MA)
- Former call signs: 3MA (1933–1997)
- Former frequencies: AM: 1360 kHz (1933–1978); AM: 1467 kHz (1978–1997)
- Call sign meaning: Radio Murray River

Technical information
- Power: 12 kW
- Transmitter coordinates: 34.210845°S 142.263992°E

Links
- Website: www.triplem.com.au/sunraysia

Triple M Sunraysia (official callsign: 3RMR) is a commercial radio station owned and operated by Southern Cross Austereo as part of the Triple M network. The station is broadcast to the Sunraysia region located on the Victoria–New South Wales border from studios in Mildura.

The station commenced broadcasting in 1933 as 3MA, initially on the AM band at a frequency of 1360 kilohertz, before converting to the FM band as Sun FM on 20 November 1997. On 15 December 2016, the station was relaunched as Triple M.

== Programming ==
Local programming is produced and broadcast from the station's Mildura studios from 6am–12pm weekdays. The station's local output consists of a three-hour breakfast show presented by Matt Jonsen, and a three-hour mornings show presented by Silco.

Networked programming originates from studios in Townsville, the Gold Coast, Melbourne and Sydney.
