= 3FUN =

Social networking website

3Fun (3FUN) is a location-based mobile online dating application for Android and iOS. 3Fun is available in the United States, United Kingdom, Brazil, the Netherlands, and several other countries. As of May 2019, there were approximately 100,000 monthly downloads, and more than 2 million total downloads.

== See also ==
- Comparison of online dating services
- Feeld
- Grindr
- Scruff
- Spoonr
