= ABC Goulburn Murray =

Albury, New South Wales Wodonga, Victoria; Australia
- Broadcast area: North East Victoria and Southern New South Wales
- Frequency: 106.5 MHz FM
- Branding: ABC Goulburn Murray

Programming
- Language: English
- Format: Talk radio
- Affiliations: ABC Local Radio

Ownership
- Owner: Australian Broadcasting Corporation

History
- First air date: 16 December 1931
- Former call signs: 2CO (1931–2000)
- Former frequencies: 675 kHz AM (1978–2000)

Technical information
- Transmitter coordinates: 36°06′43.43″S 146°53′35.66″E
- Repeaters: 91.7 MHz FM Myrtleford; 98.7 MHz FM Harrietville; 98.1 MHz FM Eildon; 99.7 MHz FM Corryong; 89.7 MHz FM Bright; 102.9 MHz FM Alexandra

Links
- Website: abc.net.au/goulburnmurray/

ABC Goulburn Murray (call sign: 3MRR) is an ABC Local Radio station based in Wodonga, Victoria, broadcasting to North East Victoria and Southern New South Wales. First aired on 16 December 1931 as 2CO from studios in Albury, New South Wales, in 2000 the station's AM transmitter in Corowa was reallocated to ABC Riverina.

The station's local programming outside of breakfast is simulcast on ABC Shepparton, while networked programming is sourced via ABC Radio Melbourne and ABC Local Radio Victoria.

== History ==
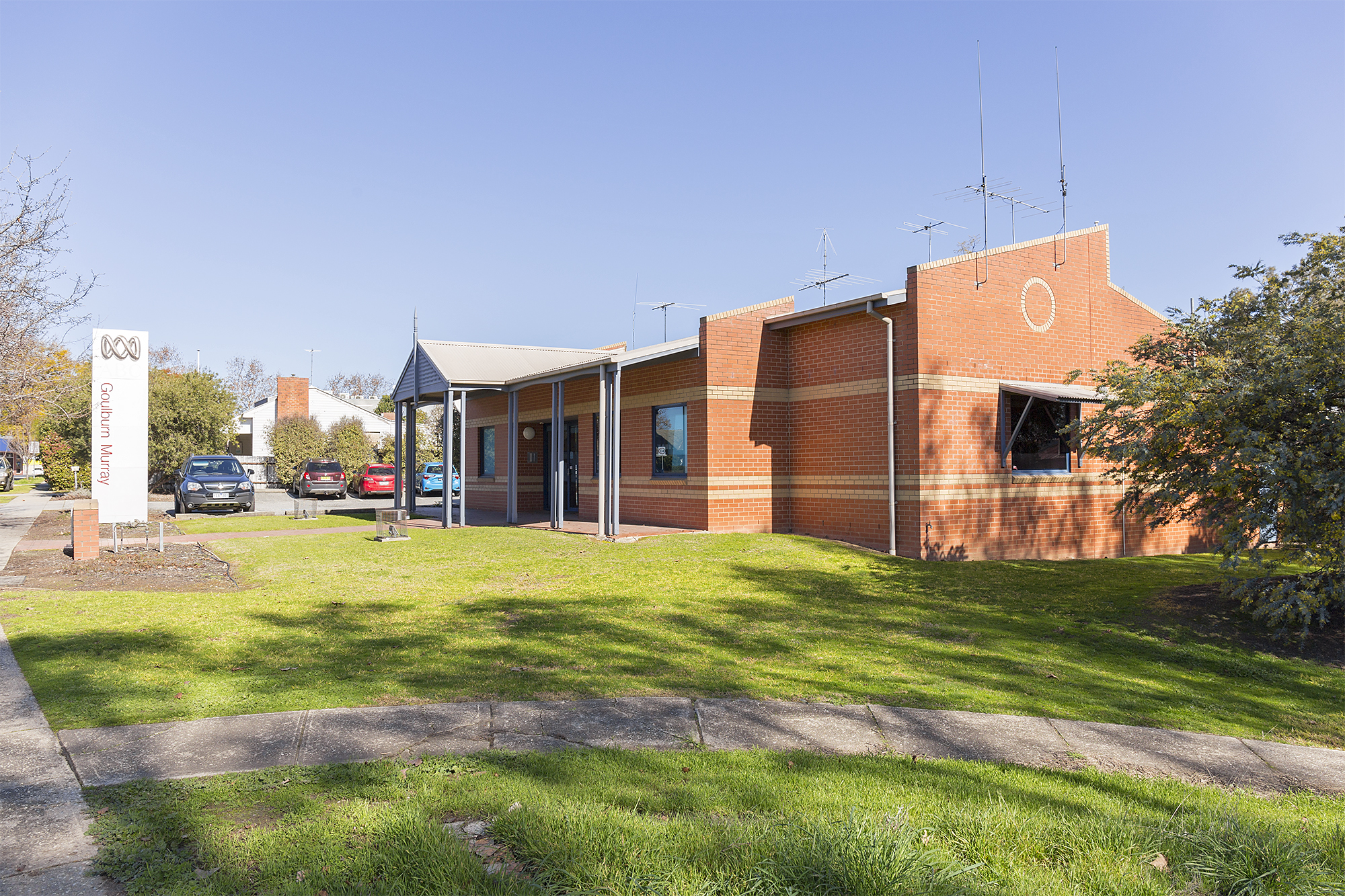
ABC Goulburn Murray studios in Wodonga

A tiny studio was established in the Albury Post Office building to enable its first employee, Arthur Newnham, to provide a modest offering of local programming in an on-air schedule that consisted mainly of a mix of programs relayed from the ABC's Melbourne radio stations, 3LO and 3AR. The 2CO studios later moved to various Albury locations: Temple Court in Dean Street; a large house at the corner of Dean and Thugoona streets; to Townsend Street; and then into a purpose-built studio at the corner of Olive and Wilson Streets.

In October 1934, 2CO played a dramatic role in the MacRobertson Air Race from Mildenhall (near London) to Melbourne when the Netherlands KLM airliner the Uiver became lost over Albury, New South Wales after being caught in a thunderstorm. 2CO announcer Arthur Newnham appealed on air for cars to line up on the Albury racecourse to light up a makeshift runway in a bid to save the plane and its occupants. The Uiver landed safely and next morning was pulled out of the mud by locals, allowing it to fly on and win the handicap section of the international air race.

In the early 1990s, 2CO was re-branded as CO-FM as it switched from the AM to the FM band, retaining this name until 2000 when it became ABC Goulburn Murray. In the late 1990s, the station relocated across the border to Wodonga, into another purpose-built premises, which remains the station's current home.

=== Mornings axing ===
In 2021, the ABC's decision to axe the local Mornings program on ABC Goulburn Murray and replace it with a statewide regional Mornings program was met with criticism from state Member for Shepparton Suzanna Sheed, independent candidate for Nicholls Rob Priestly, independent member for Indi Helen Haines and Wodonga-based senator Bridget McKenzie. Sheed described it as being "part of a progressive denigration of services." Priestly said that the decision meant that voices in the local region had "further been eroded" arguing that "issues in Gippsland are not the same as those in Shepparton or Echuca". Haines described the decision to reduce local programming on ABC Goulburn Murray as "a terrible idea" and said she intended to raise the issue with the ABC's managing director David Anderson.

Along with ABC Goulburn Murray's Mornings program, local editions which were broadcast from ABC stations at Ballarat, Bendigo, Horsham and Mildura were also axed in favour of a single statewide regional Mornings program broadcast from ABC Gippsland in Sale between 9am and 10am, which also meant that local Breakfast programs which had concluded at 10am were also shortened by an hour. The hosts of the axed local Mornings programs were redeployed as field reporters.

The ABC's director of regional and local services Judith Whelan argued that the decision to replace the local Mornings programs would increase the amount of quality regional content across Victoria. Whelan said it would enable journalists to share stories more widely stating that a single Mornings program would be better resourced and have the ability to cover bigger regional themes and increase the regional coverage of arts and culture.

=== Transmission ===
Airing on 106.5 FM from a transmission site on Mount Baranduda near Wodonga, and from low-powered transmission sites in Bright, Corryong, Harrietville and Myrtleford, ABC Goulburn Murray broadcasts its local programs from studios located at 1 High Street Wodonga, covering parts of northern Victoria and southern New South Wales including Albury, Wodonga, Wangaratta, Bright and Benalla.

The original 2CO AM transmission site was retained and is used to rebroadcast Wagga Wagga-based ABC Riverina into the southern Riverina on the 675 AM frequency.

== Presenters ==
Presenter	Role
Sandra Moon	Breakfast presenter
Alice Walker	Mornings presenter
Warwick Long	Victoria Country Hour
Nic Healey	Victoria Statewide Drive
Ray Terrill	Saturday Breakfast presenter
Gaye Pattison	Chief of Staff
Ashlee Aldridge	News reporter and presenter
Eliza Beck	News reporter and presenter
Annie Brown	News reporter and presenter
Anna Chisholm	News reporter and presenter
Jan Deane	News reporter and presenter
Erin Somerville	News reporter and presenter
Katherine Smyrk	News reporter and presenter
Rhiannon Tuffield	News reporter and presenter
