= Paper Buildings =

Buildings in Temple, London

Coordinates: 51.5122°N 0.1093°W

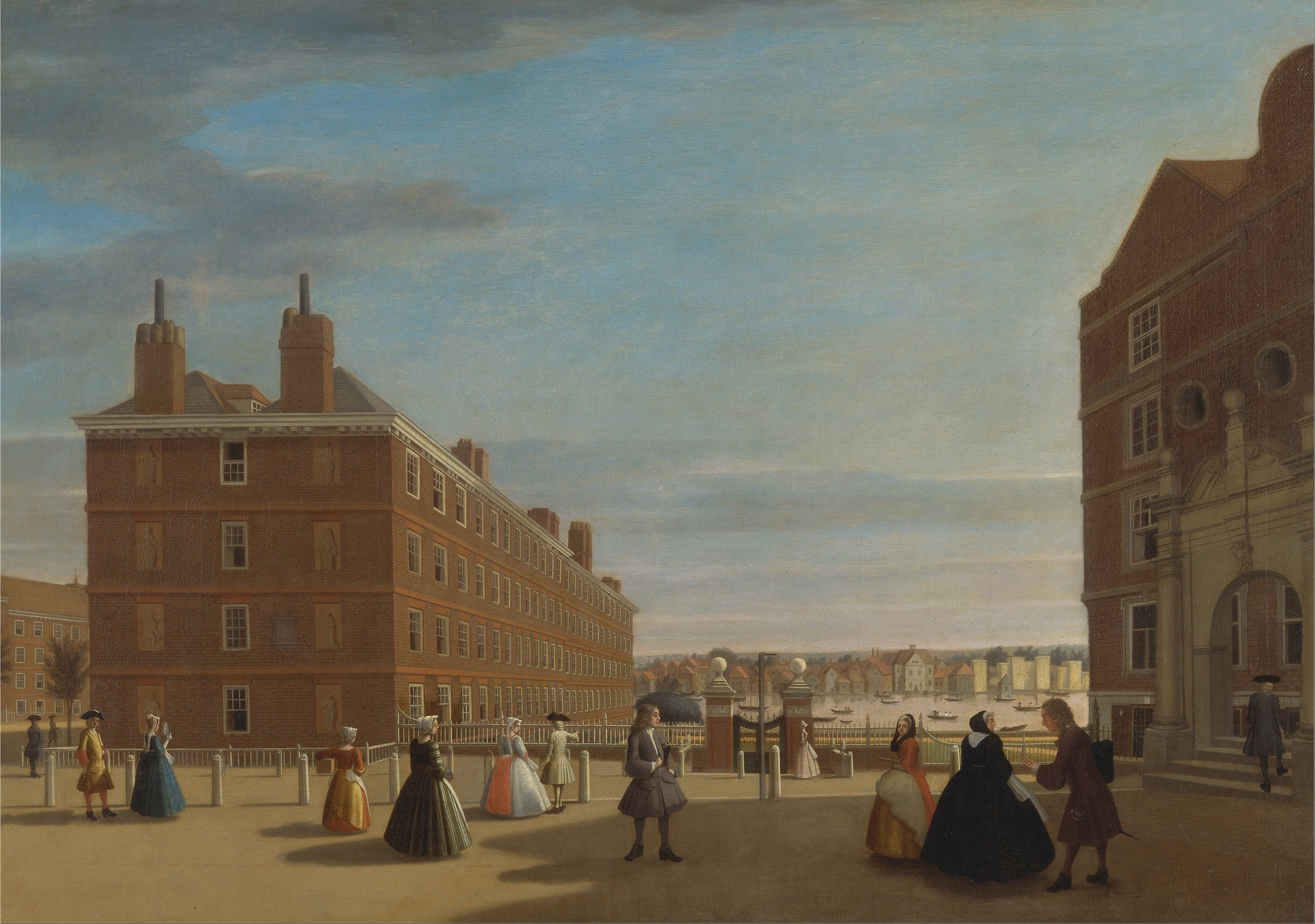
Oil painting of Paper Buildings, circa 1725

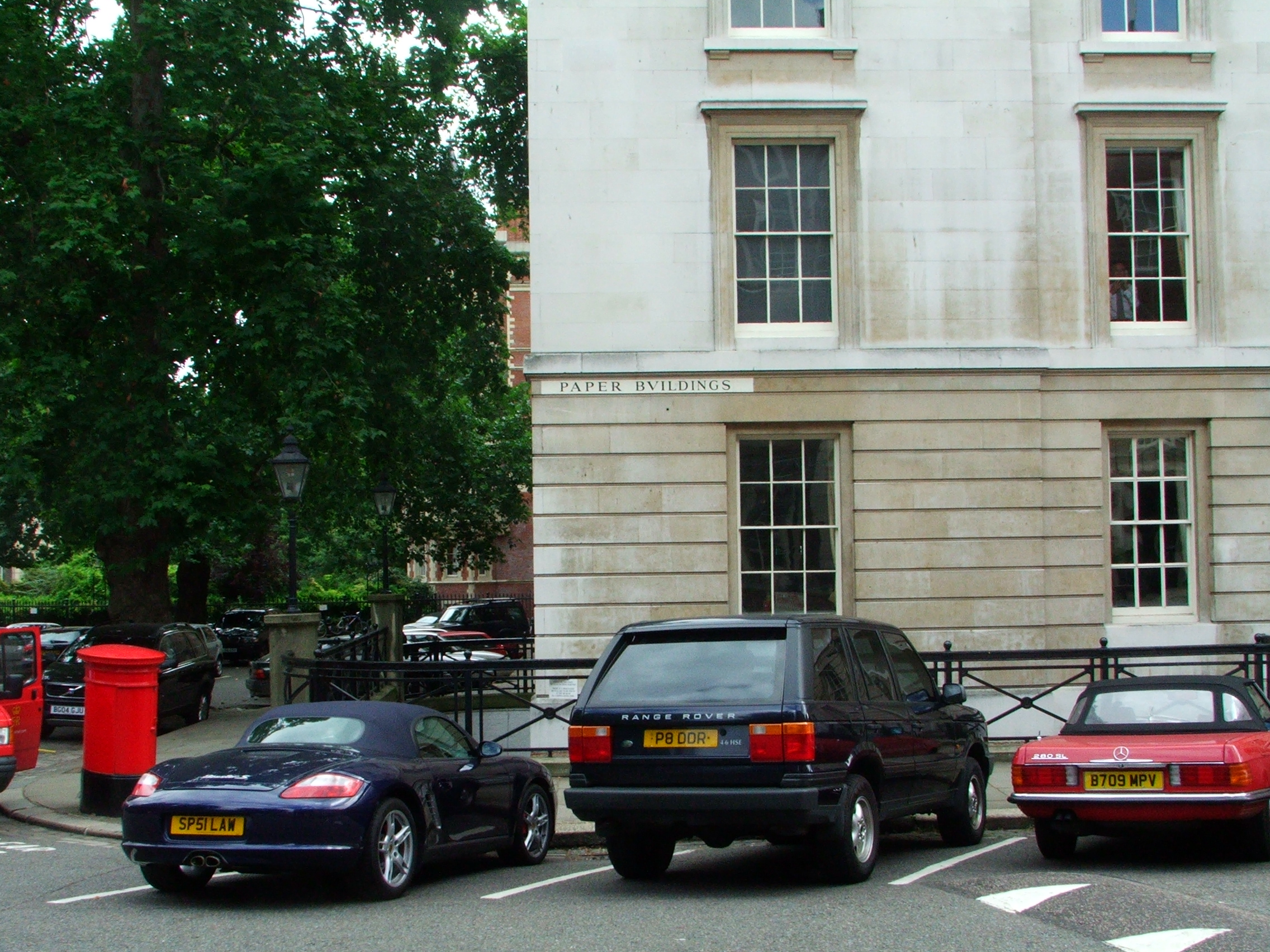
Cars parked at Paper Buildings

Paper Buildings are a set of chambers located in the Inner Temple in Temple, London. They were initially constructed in 1609. Paper Buildings appear in A Tale of Two Cities and Barnaby Rudge.

On 6 March 1838, about twenty sets of chambers were destroyed, including some valuable libraries, important documents and so forth. The fire originated in the chambers of W. H. Maule MP.

Paper Buildings are on the site of Heyward's Buildings, constructed in 1610. The "paper" part of the name comes from the fact that they were built from timber, lath and plaster, a construction method known as "paperwork". A fire in 1838 destroyed three of the buildings, which were immediately replaced with a design by Robert Smirke, with Sydney Smirke later adding two more buildings. A famous resident of (at the time) Heyward's Buildings was John Selden, who was one of the original tenants and shared a set of chambers with Heyward himself.

== 3 Paper Buildings ==
John Galsworthy had chambers here from November 1894, where he wrote a short story called "Dick Denver's Idea", which was his first work of fiction. MI5 was located here from 21 February 1911.

== 14 Paper Buildings ==
The Common Bail Office and The King's Bench Office were located here.
