= Golden Days Radio =

Golden Days Radio (3GDR)
Waverley, Victoria; Australia
- Broadcast area: Waverley RA1
- Frequency: FM: 95.7 MHz

Programming
- Format: Oldies community radio

Ownership
- Owner: Golden Days Radio for Senior Citizens Inc

History
- Founded: 1990
- First air date: 2001
- Call sign meaning: Golden Days Radio

Technical information
- Licensing authority: ACMA
- ERP: 100 W
- Transmitter coordinates: 37.877592°S 145.038699°E

Links
- Public licence information: Profile
- Webcast: Listen Live
- Website: goldendaysradio.com

Golden Days Radio (official call sign 3GDR) is a Melbourne-based community radio station broadcasting on 95.7 FM from a transmitter located at Caulfield Racecourse.

== Programming ==
Golden Days Radio is broadcast mostly thanks to volunteer presenters and a small number of volunteer staff, some of whom are former radio professionals.

=== Notable presenters ===
- Peter Thomas
- Ian McLeod
- Larry James
- Loretta Simmons
- Ramesh Rajan

== See also ==
- List of radio stations in Australia
