= 3NRG =

3NRG Incorporated
Sunbury, Victoria; Australia
- Broadcast area: Sunbury, Victoria
- Frequency: 99.3 MHz
- Branding: 99.3FM Sunbury Radio

Programming
- Format: Community

History
- First air date: July 1988
- Former call signs: 3FUN (1988–2005)
- Former frequencies: 99.4 MHz (1988–1999)

Technical information
- ERP: 400W
- Transmitter coordinates: 37.5969°S 144.7292°E

3NRG Incorporated is a community radio station based in Sunbury, Victoria.

== History ==
1980s

The radio station was established as 99.4 Bulla FM in 1988, and in 1999, the station re-branded as 3NRG and changed frequency from 99.4FM to 99.3FM.

2000s

The then Australian Broadcasting Authority issued a radio license area plan for the Sunbury region on 22 June 2000, which determined that a community radio station license should be granted for the area. 3NRG was the only applicant, and was granted a permanent license to replace the temporary license under which they had previously operated, which had just expired.

The station was established to provide local news, information and community access to the township of Sunbury, in outer north west metropolitan Melbourne, as well as to the surrounding localities of Diggers Rest, The Gap, Couangult and Toolern Vale. The station has been involved with battle of the band competitions, broadcasting community events. In June 2000, entered the Guinness book of world records for the world's longest DJ marathon.

2015/16

In 2015/16, 3NRG embarked on a station and studio rebuild project. This work involved fundraising with the funds to be invested into rebuilding the members meeting room, creating a new shared common space, and rebuilding the primary studio which has been in operation since 1997. The primary and secondary studios were also linked together, something that the organisation had wanted for several years. Other upgrades included the introduction of internet streaming and of new outside broadcasting technology, as well as upgrading broadcast and IT infrastructure.

New branding and a new website was also created for the organisation and the organisation also negotiated with a local shopping centre within the town of Sunbury to broadcast the station in the centre carpark. This work resulted in 3NRG being invited to speak for the first time as a keynote at the Community Broadcasting Association of Australia's national conference on small station innovation.

== Demographic and target audience ==
Previously considered a rural town, Sunbury has experienced growth since the 1970s with the expansion of Melbourne's metropolitan area.

The average age of Sunbury residents is 36 years. Sunbury has comparatively higher rates of employment, higher average income and higher education than other areas within the Hume municipality and Melbourne. Sunbury's small ethnic groups have integrated well into the local community. The majority of residents identify as speaking only English, while the majority of ethnic residents also speak English as a second language.

== See also ==
- List of radio stations in Australia
