= OKR FM =

Kilmore, Victoria, Australia; Australia
- Frequency: 98.3 MHz FM
- Branding: OKR FM

Programming
- Language: English
- Format: Community radio

Ownership
- Owner: Mitchell Community Radio Inc

History
- Former frequencies: 97.1 MHz FM (2002–2009)

Technical information
- ERP: 30W (Kilmore); 10W (Wallan)
- Repeater: 97.1 MHz FM Wallan

Links
- Website: www.okrfm.com.au

OKR FM is a community radio station, broadcasting from the Kilmore Racecourse to the Mitchell Shire area of Victoria, Australia.

== History ==
OKR FM was first established under the name OK Radio – or Old Kilmore Radio – and in 2001 was successful in being granted a low power Narrowcast licence of 10 Watts in Kilmore. In 2002, the licence was surrendered in return for a Community licence, to permit greater depth in programming otherwise not permitted under a Narrowcast licence. The station has within the past few years adjusted its branding from OK Radio to OKR FM. First broadcasting on 97.1 FM, the station moved to 98.3 FM to increase power. In 2013, the 97.1 FM frequency returned – as a repeater covering areas surrounding Wallan.

Today, OKR FM airs a mix of music programming, with a selection of specialist music programs (including country music, rock, jazz and hiphop) and community programs presented by various community organisations in the township and surrounding areas, including local council information, local sport, local youth programs (as part of the OKR "Young Presenters Quest") and other specialty programs and features.
