= Gold Central Victoria =

- Maryborough, Victoria; Australia
- Broadcast area: Central Victoria
- Frequency: AM: 1071 kHz
- Branding: Gold Central Victoria

Programming
- Language: English
- Format: Classic hits

Ownership
- Owner: ARN; (Radio Central Victoria Pty Ltd)

History
- First air date: 1938
- Former call signs: 3CV (1938–1999); EasyMix
- Call sign meaning: Easy Listening

Technical information
- Power: 5 kW
- Transmitter coordinates: 37.043836°S 143.818526°E
- Repeater: FM: 98.3 MHz Bendigo

Links
- Website: goldcentralvictoria.com.au

Gold (call-sign: 3EL) is a commercial radio station based in Bendigo and Central Victoria. It is a subsidiary of ARN Media. Formerly branded "Easymix", the station broadcasts on 1071 AM, across parts of Central Victoria including Bendigo, Ballarat, Maryborough, Castlemaine and Daylesford. It also broadcasts on 98.3 FM, which covers a 25 kilometre radius in the Bendigo region.

Radio station 3CV began broadcasting on the 1071 AM frequency in 1938, but Gold was never technically 3CV, that call sign had been relinquished when 3CV was given a Section 39 supplementary FM licence and became Star FM, now known as Hit 91.9. The discarded 1071 AM frequency was purchased by a solo operator and became "Easy Listening 1071". Several years later, it was sold and re-branded as "Easymix 1071". On 1 August 2014, EasyMix re-branded to "Gold"

In November 2021, Gold, along with other stations owned by Grant Broadcasters, was acquired by the Australian Radio Network. The deal, which was finalised on 4 January 2022. According to a media release from ARN, it was expected that Gold would integrate with ARN's Pure Gold Network, but would retain its name. It was thought that the deal included a clause not allowing ARN to reduce staffing levels for two years.

Notable names to grace the airwaves from both station brands include Bruce Lees, Ali Mac (Alison MacDougle), Ted Guinea, Warren Kay (Warren Koglin), Jake Wilson and Dave Burroughs. Long term breakfast announcer Mark Robbo Robinson has held his position since 2017 and remains a driving force of the Gold brand.
