= Mixx FM 107.7 =

107.7 Mixx FM (3SHI)
- Swan Hill; Australia
- Broadcast area: Swan Hill RA1
- Frequency: 107.7 MHz

Programming
- Language: English
- Format: Contemporary hit radio

Ownership
- Owner: ACE Radio; (ACE Radio Broadcasters Pty Ltd)
- Sister stations: 3SH

History
- Call sign meaning: 3 for Victoria plus SHI for Swan Hill

Technical information
- Licensing authority: ACMA
- ERP: 16,400 watts
- Transmitter coordinates: 35.408369°S 143.581935°E
- Repeater: Kerang (98.7 MHz)

Links
- Public licence information: Profile
- Website: www.mixx1077.com.au

Mixx FM 107.7 is a commercial radio station broadcasting from Swan Hill, Victoria, Australia. It is currently owned by Ace Radio & broadcasts A Contemporary Hits Radio (CHR) format. It features both locally produced content & nationally syndicated content from both Hit Network & Grant Broadcasters. They have a repeater in Kerang on 98.7FM.
