= 88.3 Southern FM =

Coordinates: 37°54′18″S 144°59′43″E

88.3 Southern FM (3SCB)

Bentleigh East, Victoria; Australia
- Broadcast area: Melbourne South RA1
- Frequency: 88.3 MHz

Programming
- Format: Community radio

Ownership
- Owner: Southern Community Broadcasters Inc

Technical information
- Licensing authority: ACMA
- ERP: 200 watts

Links
- Public licence information: Profile
- Webcast: Tune-in
- Website: www.southernfm.com.au

88.3 Southern FM (call sign: 3SCB) is a community radio station based in Bentleigh East, Victoria. It is licensed by the Australian Communications and Media Authority.

Southern FM is the local community radio station for the south, south-eastern and bayside suburbs of Melbourne with a population of over 470,000.

== History ==
The radio station was established in 1981 by former Australian Broadcasting Control Board member Dom Iacono and then former ABC engineer Jack Burgesson, who with a dedicated band of volunteers, first broadcast for a two-day broadcast from the Caulfield Town Hall.

The first test broadcast was not spectacular or particularly notable apart from the fact that it was the first test broadcast by the new group, and attracted much interest in the local area which the radio station was to eventually service.

The second test broadcast was from the store room of the now demolished East Bentleigh Community Hall.

The station was originally established to cover the then municipal areas of Chelsea, Mordialloc, Sandringham, Caulfield, and Brighton.

As part of a planning review prior to the formal invitations for licence applications, the Australian Broadcasting Tribunal (now ABA) had offered SCB an extension to its coverage area to include the areas bounded by the Cities of Prahran, St Kilda, and Waverley in addition to the inclusion of the Inner eastern areas (now covered by 3WBC)

The Inner Eastern suburban area (that being the area of the then Cities of Box Hill Camberwell, Hawthorn and Kew) was without a local radio service at the time of the formation and development of the suburban community radio groups such as SCB, ECB, VYV, MDR, etc.

Although the Inner Eastern municipal areas were designated by the then-ABA for a potential new area it was, prior to licensing of the first group of Sub-Metropolitan stations offered to Southern Community Broadcasters as an addition to its licence area, due to a lack of a local service.

Southern Community Broadcasters - after AGMs and resolutions had after an initial interest in the addition of the area to its own, rejected the proposal - claiming the Inner East was not an area that shared the Bayside / Inner South identity.

After a succession of approximately 20 test broadcasts of one- to two-week durations, the parent organisation Southern Community Broadcasters Inc was successful in being granted a full-time licence on 30 March 1990.

Following many moves of studios and offices, the radio station ended up at Railway Crescent Moorabbin, above the (now) former Salvation Army Opportunity Shop.

From there the radio station moved to the Moorabbin City Council offices and from there (in 2009) to 22 Balcombe Road in the suburb of Mentone. The most recent relocation was in April 2015 to new facilities at 2 Parliament Street, Brighton.

== Southern FM Programs ==
Southern FM presents an extremely wide and diverse mixture of general entertainment and specialist interest music and spoken word based programs. The programme is designed for targeted listening. Southern FM, like many other community radio stations in Melbourne, has incorporated many non-English speaking groups into the programme schedule.

Southern FM is licensed by the Australian Communications and Media Authority (originally as a "C" class community radio station). The classifications system for varying designations of community radio broadcast stations no longer apply). Southern FM operates on a power output of 200 watts ERP from Moorabbin. This provides reception on a car radio throughout most of the metropolitan area.

The longest serving on air presenters at Southern FM include Peter Kemp (Peter's Preferences), Andrew Rennie (The Space Show), David Kaffey (Midday Magic) and Bruce Mitchell (Southern Sport).

Presenters who had moved on from Southern FM include a small group who founded and participated in the first broadcasts of the now defunct temporary youth broadcasting station Hitz FM - this was following from the success in 1991 of a Saturday Night radio programme NightBeat. In later years another community radio station Golden Days Radio (at the time of formation recognised as Spirit Of Australia Broadcasters) was founded by a number of people formerly on the founding Committee of Southern FM.

Current programs can be viewed on the program guide on Southern FM's website.

== Committee ==
Southern FM is operated by Southern Community Broadcasters Inc, established in 1986 as a community operated not-for-profit local radio station. The station is managed by a Board of Management, elected annually by its members.

The current Southern FM Board of Management are:

- President - Colin Tyrus
- Vice President - Alan Clement
- Secretary - Patricia Watts
- Treasurer - Craig Francis
- Technology Manager - Bjorn Steguweit
- Sponsorship Manager - Tim Symons
- Music Director - Petar Tolich
