= 3CW =

Leopold, Victoria; Australia
- Frequency: 1341 kHz
- Branding: 3CW Chinese Radio

Programming
- Language: Chinese
- Format: Talk radio

Ownership
- Owner: AIMG Holdings under lease from Grant Broadcasters; (Geelong Broadcasters Pty Ltd)

Technical information
- ERP: 5 kW
- HAAT: 60m
- Transmitter coordinates: 38°10′15″S 144°27′5″E

3CW 1620AM Program
Bayswater, Victoria; Australia
- Frequency: 1620 kHz
- Branding: 3CW Chinese Radio 1620AM Program

Programming
- Language: Chinese
- Format: Chinese music

Ownership
- Owner: AIMG Holdings under lease from Gumnut Nominees; (Gumnut Nominees Pty Ltd)

Technical information
- ERP: 400 watt
- Transmitter coordinates: 37°50′31″S 145°16′20″E

3CW was an Australian local Chinese language radio station based in South Melbourne. The station's main service was broadcast under a high powered open narrowcast (HPON) licence on 1341 kHz AM, operated by AIMG Holdings. The transmitter is located in Leopold, Victoria, facing the Port Phillip Bay.

The 1341 licence is owned by Grant Broadcasters, and is leased to the broadcasters. This frequency was formerly occupied by 3GL before the latter converted to FM in the 1990s. 3CW also broadcasts a Chinese music-formatted station in the AM narrowband. Branded 3CW 1620AM Program, the station is broadcast from Bayswater. 3CW also has a monthly magazine called "3CW Journal".
