= Good News Radio 103.9 =

Coordinates: 37°32′17″S 143°50′13″E

Good News Radio 103.9 is a Christian radio station broadcast in Ballarat, Australia. It was established in 1993 to serve the community by providing a Christian radio broadcasting.

Some of the stations most popular shows are King’s Business and Aiden G On The Radio.

It has programs for all ages, kids, youth, adult and the older generation are all covered.
