= Hot 25 Countdown =

The Hot 25 Countdown
- Genre: Radio show
- Running time: 2 hours
- Country of origin: Australia
- Language(s): English
- Starring: Steve Lanzon
- Recording studio: Brisbane, Queensland
- Original release: 1990 – 2016
- Website: Hot 25 Countdown

The Hot 25 Countdown was a weekly Australian Christian music radio program.

The show was produced in Brisbane, Queensland and was hosted by 96five Family FM breakfast announcer, Steve Lanzon.

The Hot 25 Countdown commenced in 1990 and was heard on numerous radio stations in over 600 towns and cities across the country, including in all Australian capital cities. After 27 years, the Hot 25 Countdown was ended in 2017/18, when Steve Lanzon went to co-host Ken, Nicky and Steve.

Capital city stations that broadcast the program include Sydney's Hope 103.2, Melbourne's Light FM, Adelaide's Life FM, Perth's Sonshine FM, Hobart's Ultra106five, Darwin's 97 Seven, Canberra's 1WAY FM and Brisbane's 96five Family FM.

The Vision Radio Network and the commercial Flow FM network also broadcast the program.

The Hot 25 Countdown was also heard in the United States of America on Life985 in New Jersey.

The show features the 25 most popular songs on the Australian Christian music chart, counted down from 25 to 1. Additionally, the show includes interviews and discussions about Christian bands and the music they release.
