= Fresh FM (Bendigo) =

Bendigo, Victoria, Australia; Australia
- Broadcast area: Central Victoria
- Frequency: 101.5 FM

Programming
- Language: English
- Format: Central Victorian sport, Australian rules football, 70s, 80s and 90s hits

Ownership
- Owner: Greater Bendigo Community Radio Inc.

History
- First air date: 1983
- Former call signs: 3CCC
- Former frequencies: 103.9 FM, 89.5 FM
- Call sign meaning: 3 – Victoria; BBS – Bendigo's Best Sport

Fresh FM, also known as Bendigo's Fresh FM 101.5 and Bendigo's Best Sport (from its 3BBS call sign), is a community radio station broadcast in Bendigo, Australia. It began in 1983 as 3CCC based in Harcourt at the disused Harcourt railway station using the frequency 103.9 FM and later moved to Garsed Street in Bendigo.

== History ==
The Australian Broadcasting Tribunal allocated Fresh 89.5 FM a community broadcasting license in 1983 to provide a community broadcasting service within the Bendigo area.

After 25 years of broadcasting, Fresh FM had is license cancelled in 2006 by the Australian Communications and Media Authority when the station failed to lodge renewal applications despite 12 months of frequent reminders. This resulted in a handful of on-air announcers walking from the community station, citing difficulties with management and disagreements with new programming (including increased use of pre-recorded content from 98.9 FM (Brisbane)).

The station was found in breach of its temporary license conditions in 2008 "by failing to represent the Bendigo Community". The ACMA stated that annual general meetings to allow members to contribute to the operation of the station were not held between 2001 and 2006.

In a plan to transfer the 89.5 frequency to ABC NewsRadio to broadcast national parliament, the ACMA suggested that Fresh FM and fellow community station Phoenix FM share the 101.5 frequency with Central Victoria Gospel Radio. Finally, after sharing a frequency with the then-testing Phoenix FM on 89.5, the ACMA allocated the 101.5 frequency to Fresh FM in 2010 and Phoenix to 106.7 and Central Victoria Gospel Radio to 105.1.

In 2014, Fresh FM became the first local radio station to broadcast a live Victorian Women's Football League match at the Queen Elizabeth Oval.

== Format ==
Fresh FM is known for its local sports broadcasts, including live commentators with match coverage of Central Victorian netball, basketball and football, and has broadcast live Australian rules football games via the National Indigenous Radio Service. Listeners are involved in "SMS requests" into the station with song requests during the workday, the music tailored primarily to the 70s, 80s and 90s decades of music.

== See also ==
- List of radio stations in Australia
