= 94.7 The Pulse =

Radio station in Geelong, Victoria

Coordinates: 38°09′00″S 144°21′45″E

- Geelong, Victoria, Australia; Australia
- Frequency: 94.7 MHz FM

Programming
- Language: English
- Format: Community radio

Ownership
- Owner: Diversitat; (GEELONG ETHNIC COMMUNITIES COUNCIL INC)

History
- First air date: 1 May 1988
- Former call signs: 3YYR (1988–2001)
- Former frequencies: 100.3 MHz FM (1988–2001)
- Call sign meaning: 3 – Victoria the PuLSe

Links
- Website: www.947thepulse.com

94.7 The Pulse (callsign: 3PLS), is a community radio station which broadcasts to the region of Geelong, Victoria, Australia.

== History ==
The Pulse had previously been known as 3YYR, broadcasting on 100.3 MHz FM before becoming known as Geelong Community Radio on the same frequency. In 2001, frequency 100.3 MHz was issued to then-new commercial station Nova 100 in Melbourne, and the station was moved to its current frequency of 94.7 MHz FM and changed names to 94.7 The Pulse. Its studios, which are based at 68–70 Lt Ryrie St, Geelong, at the Geelong Media Education Centre, also function as a training facility for other forms of media.

The Geelong Media Co-operative—the then operators of 3YYR—operated the radio station for a period of time in conjunction with Diversitat, the operational arm of the Geelong Ethnic Communities Council, representing the ethnic broadcasters. The full-time licence then held by the GCRC was surrendered to the Australian Communications and Media Authority. The licence then passed to Diversitat, who have since maintained the mix of ethnic and broader community programming. The station is now run by a board drawn from the volunteer operators and has a representative on the GECC executive.

=== Frequency battle ===
The frequency used by the station is not guaranteed for a future community radio service, and as such has become available in the longer term for a potential variety of alternative services.

In June 2007, an article appeared in the Geelong Advertiser stating that the Australian Broadcasting Corporation (ABC) wanted to establish a radio station in Geelong, and wanted to take over the frequency used by The Pulse. The Pulse has organised a campaign to protect the frequency.

On 18 August 2008, the Australian Communications and Media Authority announced a proposal which would see 94.7 The Pulse move to 91.9 FM with a reduced broadcast power of 3 kW, down from 56 kW

On 27 August 2009, the ACMA announced that the station would be able to keep its frequency, with ABC Local Radio having to find another location to broadcast to the region. This followed widespread support from listeners and local government for The Pulse.

== Gallery ==
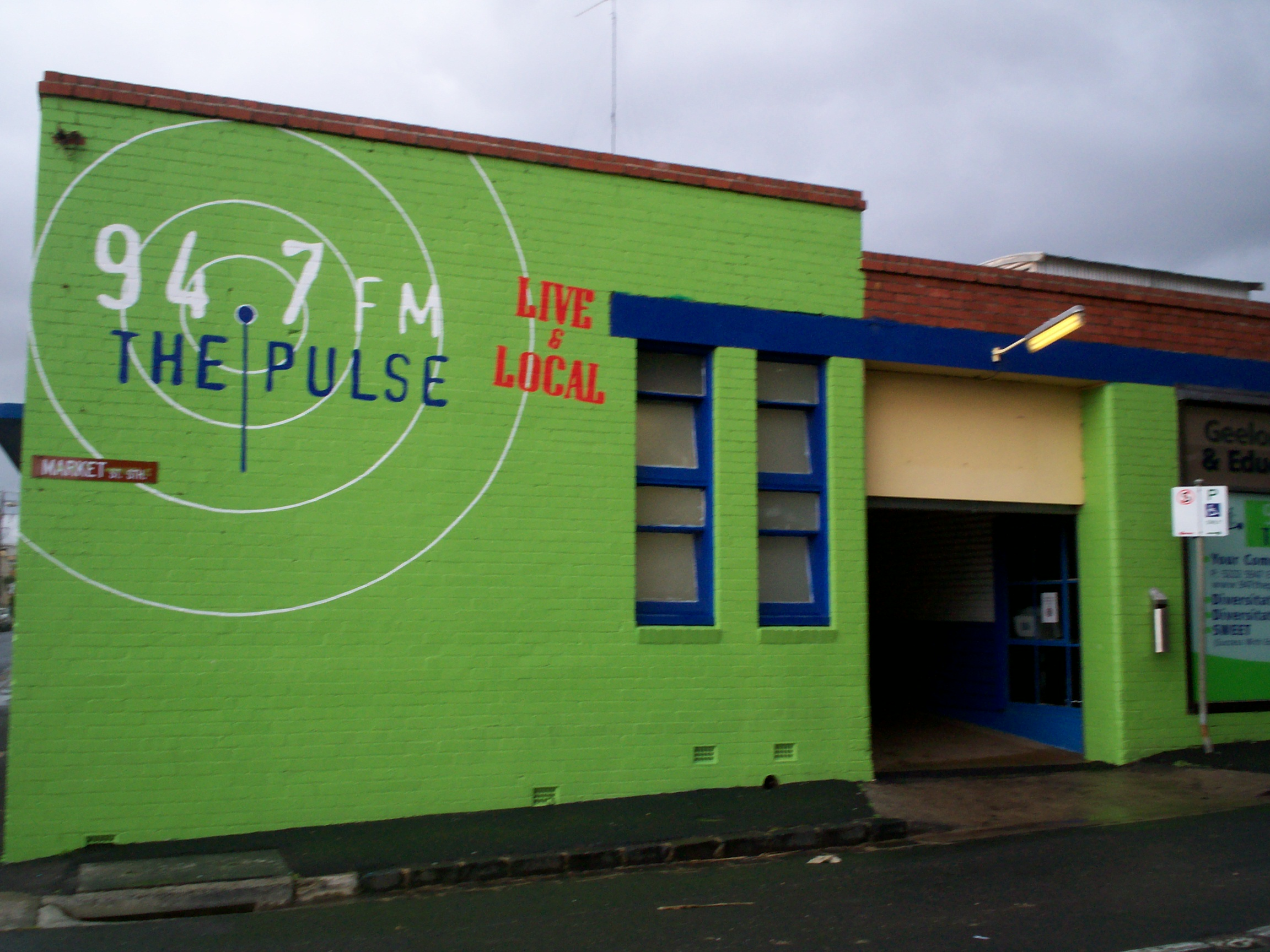
The Studios of 94.7 The Pulse (Front Left of Building).

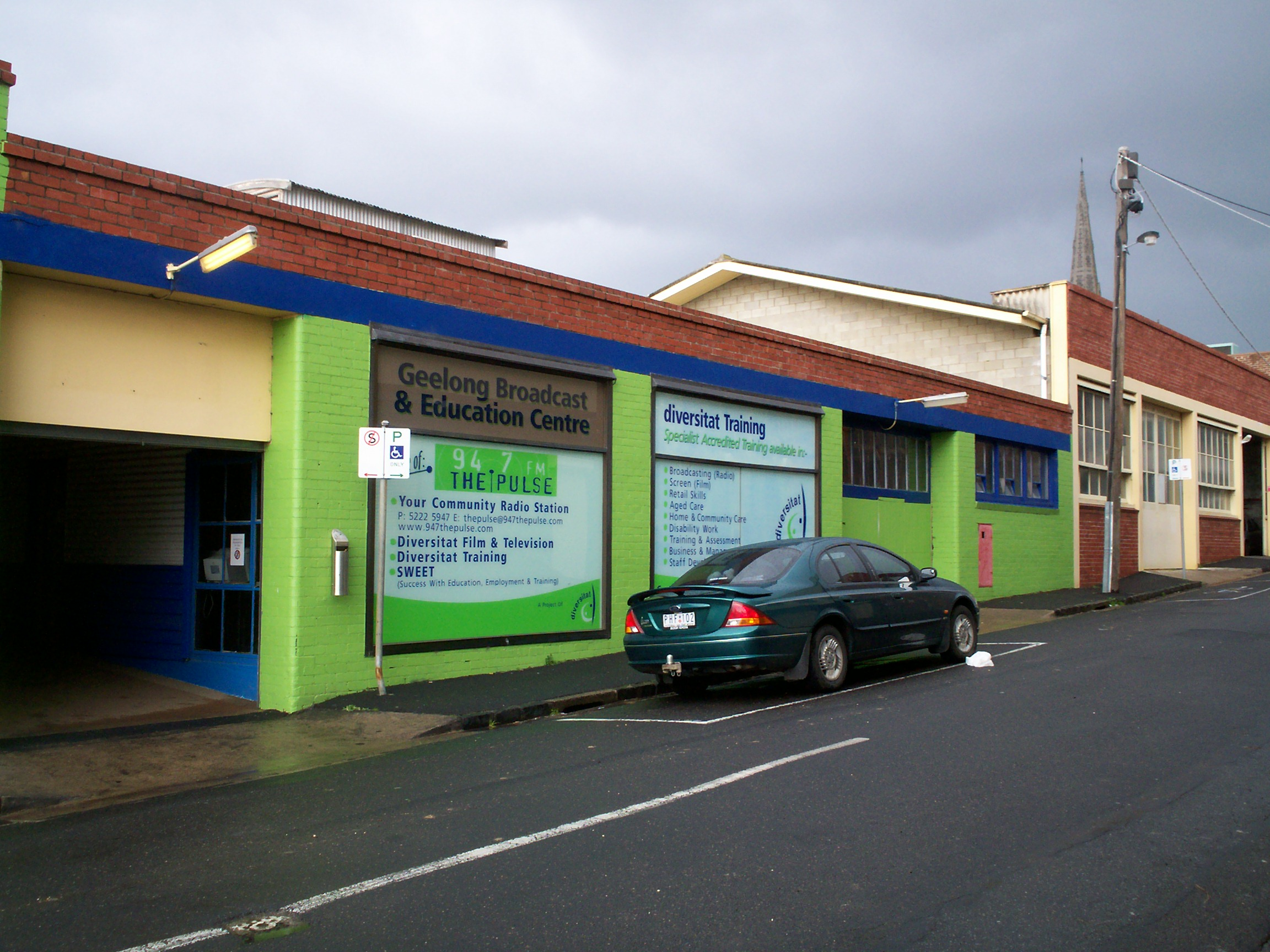
The Studios of 94.7 The Pulse (Front Right of Building).
