= ABC Shepparton =

Australia
- Broadcast area: Shepparton and surrounds
- Frequency: 97.7 MHz FM

Programming
- Format: Talk

Ownership
- Owner: Australian Broadcasting Corporation

Technical information
- Transmitter coordinates: 36°22′15.90″S 145°24′03.56″E
- Repeaters: 98.1 MHz FM Eildon; 102.9 MHz FM Alexandra; 103.7 MHz FM Mansfield

Links
- Website: abc.net.au/shepparton/

ABC Shepparton (call sign: 3GVR) is an ABC Local Radio station based in Shepparton, Victoria, Australia, broadcasting on 97.7 MHz, the frequency formerly occupied by ABC Goulburn Murray in circa 2006. The station features a local breakfast show between 6:30am and 9:00am each weekday.
