= MainFM 94.9 =

MAINfm 94.9FM
Castlemaine, Victoria; Australia
- Frequency: 94.9 MHz

Programming
- Language: English
- Format: Community Radio

Ownership
- Owner: Castlemaine District Radio Inc.

History
- First air date: 7 April 2000
- Call sign meaning: 3 = VIC, WMA = Wireless Mount Alexander

Technical information
- ERP: 1000 watts

Links
- Webcast: s1.communitybroadcastnetwork.com.au:8000/MAINFM/stream
- Website: mainfm.net

MAINfm 94.9 (call sign: 3WMA) is a community radio station which broadcasts on 94.9MHz from its studios in Halford Street, Castlemaine in Victoria, Australia.

MAINfm 94.9 holds a Permanent Community Broadcasting Licence (PCBL). The station is also a full member of the Community Broadcasting Association of Australia (CBAA). Ian Braybrook and Marilyn Bennet started WMAfm (for Wireless Mount Alexander). WMAfm broadcast from studios at the Old Castlemaine goal. MAINfm broadcasts a wide variety of music and talk/magazine style shows. All of the presenters are volunteers.

In 2014, the station changed its name from WMA FM to MAINfm. Shortly thereafter the station acquired a caravan that was converted into a remote broadcast studio for outside broadcasts from community events and sports matches. In late 2014 the station relocated its studios from the old gaol to the old hospital buildings in Halford Street.

In 2018, after receiving funding from the Victorian state government, MAINfm employed a Station Manager. Following this, in 2019 they hired a Sponsorships & Fundraising Co-ordinator.

Each June the station holds The MAIN Game, an Australian rules football match as a fundraiser.

In 2016 Main FM won the Community Broadcasting Association of Australia's most outstanding small station award and in 2018 won the best station fundraising campaign.

In 2020 MAINfm was awarded the CBAA's Most Outstanding Small Station Award and won the Best Fundraising Event for the 2020 Here Comes the Sun Radiothon.
