= Voice FM 99.9 =

Ballarat, Victoria, Australia; Australia
- Broadcast area: Australia
- Frequency: 99.9

Programming
- Language: English
- Format: Rock, Adult Contemporary, Talk Radio, General

Ownership
- Owner: Ballarat Community FM Radio Co-operative Limited

Links
- Website: Voice FM 99.9 http://www.voicefm.com.au/

Voice FM 99.9 (call sign: 3BBB) is a community radio station broadcast in Ballarat, Australia. It was established in 1982 to cater to the needs of people who are denied access to, and were not adequately served by, existing media in Central Victoria.

The station began full-time broadcasting in 1984, received its full license in 1986 and was named 3BBB after its call sign 3BBB became Voice FM in 2000 and is operated as a cooperative – Ballarat Community FM Radio Co-operative Limited.

== See also ==
- List of radio stations in Australia
