= ABC Ballarat =

Coordinates: 37.562424°S 143.853427°E

- Australia
- Broadcast area: Ballarat
- Frequency: 107.9 MHz FM

Programming
- Format: Talk

Ownership
- Owner: Australian Broadcasting Corporation

History
- First air date: 30 June 2003

Links
- Website: abc.net.au/ballarat

ABC Ballarat, callsign 3CRR, is an ABC Local Radio station in Ballarat, Victoria, Australia. ABC Ballarat is one of the newest stations in the network, opened on 30 June 2003. The station is the largest regional ABC station in Victoria and is home to a team of broadcasters, journalists, program-makers and online producers, providing news, programs and online content primarily about serves Ballarat, Ararat and Daylesford, as well as parts of south-west Victoria including Hamilton, Port Fairy, and Warrnambool through ABC South West Victoria.

Starting with a staff of just nine in 2003, ABC Ballarat now has a total of 16 full-time employees. A breakfast program is presented by Steve Martin from 6.15 am to 10.00 am weekdays. A mornings program is presented by Gavin McGrath from 10.00 am to 11.00 am weekdays.

The regional Statewide Drive program (3.00 pm to 6.00 pm weekdays) is also broadcast from the Ballarat studios. It is presented by Prue Bentley and covers Victoria, southern New South Wales and a small part of eastern South Australia. It does not broadcast into the Melbourne metro area.

== See also ==
- List of radio stations in Australia
