= ABC Wimmera =

- Australia
- Broadcast area: Western Victoria
- Frequency: 594 kHz AM

Programming
- Format: Talk

Ownership
- Owner: Australian Broadcasting Corporation

History
- First air date: 25 February 1937
- Call sign meaning: Western Victoria

Technical information
- Power: 50 kW
- Transmitter coordinates: 36°42′42.07″S 142°12′02.88″E

Links
- Website: www.abc.net.au/radio/wimmera

ABC Wimmera (call sign: 3WV) is an ABC Local Radio station in the Wimmera region of Victoria, Australia. Its primary transmitter is located in Horsham which broadcasts on 594 kHz AM. The station is clearly receivable over most of western Victoria, well beyond the Wimmera. In the past, it was designed to serve this broader region.

== History ==
3WV – both the station's callsign and original name – was conceived in the mid-1930s, and officially opened on 25 February 1937. It was ABC's second regional radio station; ABC Wimmera was later joined by four other ABC radio stations in the Western part of Victoria. 3WV was intended as a back-up to Melbourne's 3LO during World War II. Japanese bombs never struck Victoria, however 3WV did play a role broadcasting coded messages at times.

The station's south-west coverage area split from ABC Western Victoria in 2004 to become ABC South West Victoria. The station's studios in Baillie Street, Horsham were upgraded in 2006 to digital broadcasting facilities, making them one of the ABC's most advanced studios in Australia.

From 8 April 2019, the name of the station was changed from ABC Western Victoria to ABC Wimmera to better identify the intended coverage area.

== See also ==
- List of radio stations in Australia
