= ABC Mildura Swan Hill =

ABC local radio station in Mildura, Victoria, Australia

- Australia
- Broadcast area: North West Victoria and South West New South Wales
- Frequencies: 104.3 FM; 102.1 FM

Programming
- Format: Talk

Ownership
- Owner: Australian Broadcasting Corporation

History
- First air date: 1990

Technical information
- Transmitter coordinates: 34°10′59.89″S 142°09′28.64″E

Links
- Website: abc.net.au/milduraswanhill/

ABC Mildura Swan Hill (call sign: 3MIL) is an ABC Local Radio station based in Mildura, Victoria. The station, opened in 1990, covers northwest Victoria and southwest New South Wales, including Mildura, Swan Hill, Buronga, Kerang, and Ouyen.
