= ABC Gippsland =

Australia
- Broadcast area: Gippsland
- Frequency: 828 kHz AM 100.7 MHz FM

Programming
- Format: Talk

Ownership
- Owner: Australian Broadcasting Corporation

History
- First air date: 31 October 1935

Technical information
- Transmitter coordinates: 38°05′57.37″S 147°04′06.82″E
- Translators: 720 kHz AM Omeo; 97.1 MHz FM Orbost; 100.7 MHz FM Mount Tassie; 104.9 MHz FM Mallacoota; 106.1 MHz FM Cann River

Links
- Website: www.abc.net.au/gippsland/

ABC Gippsland (call sign: 3GLR) is an ABC Local Radio station in Gippsland, Victoria, Australia. The station is based in Sale and covers from Warragul, through to Mallacoota. Mim Hook hosts the Breakfast program produced by Zaida Glibanovic, while Jonathon Kendall presents a Statewide Mornings program produced by Madeleine Spencer from the Sale studio.

Journalists at the station include Bec Symons, Natasha Schapova, William Howard, Georgia Lenton-Williams, Fifi Boom and Rachael Lucas.

At the time of its opening on 31 October 1935 ABC Gippsland 3GI was the sixth regional station opened by the ABC and the first of its kind in regional Victoria. The station was initially based in Sale's Post Office Building, and boasted what was at the time the tallest mast and most powerful transmitter in the state, located near Longford and currently transmits on 828 kHz. ABC Gippsland now broadcasts from York Street, Sale.

The station was also formerly known as GI FM.

Sister station 3MT based at Omeo broadcasts on a frequency of 720 kHz.

== See also ==
- List of radio stations in Australia
