= Radio EMFM =

Radio EMFM 104.7

Echuca Moama; Australia
- Broadcast area: Echuca Moama and surrounding areas
- Frequency: 104.7 MHz FM

Programming
- Language: English
- Format: Contemporary hit radio (pop, rock, Rockabilly, Rock and Roll, Swing Music, Jump Blues, Boogie-Woogie, Adult contemporary, Alternative radio, Alternative radio

Ownership
- Owner: Echuca Moama Broadcast Inc.

History
- Call sign meaning: 3GRR

Technical information
- ERP: 1 kW
- HAAT: 20 Metres

Links
- Website: www.radioemfm.org.au

Radio EMFM 104.7 is a community radio station based in the town of Echuca, Australia. On 4 November 1997, EMFM was issued a full-time licence, broadcasting 24 hours a day, 7 days a week on a frequency of 104.7 MHz, which it does to this day.

== Today ==
EMFM has over 20 announcers, supporting & technical staff combined. They have a variety of DJs ranging from 13 to over 60 all playing different genres of music, Hit Music can be heard on a Sunday, with all other genres of music heard ranging from Monday to Saturday

== History ==
Radio EMFM was housed in a warehouse in an office when they 1st started in Matong Rd, Echuca in 1977 . It was divided into 3 studios, with only 1 equipped. Some programs were still being relayed from KLFM in Bendigo. On 4 November 1997, EMFM was issued a full-time licence, broadcasting 24 hours a day, 7 days a week on a frequency of 104.7 MHz, which it does to this day. During this time, Radio EMFM's production facilities were used to record the then Royal Vic. Institute for the Blind (now Vision Aust) Talking Riverine Herald & Deniliquin Times Newspaper. Outside broadcasts have always been part of Radio EMFM, and with the gift of a caravan from Echuca Moama Rotary Club, after some refurbishment in 2008, they will have a permanent mobile studio. EMFM moved to Matong Rd for some 7–8 years, then to a ’dog box’ studio at the back of the Echuca Bowling Club for 2 years. This was a cramped two room portable, until we moved into the present studios in December 2006 at the Echuca East Recreation Reserve after they had been refurbished. They now have a sound-proof ‘on air’ studio, a library room, an office, and a production studio and toilets. The studios in Sutton St were officially opened on 12 February 2007 by Monique Wright, Weather Presenter on TV Channel 7’s Sunrise Program. They are still present at this site.
