= ABC Central Victoria =

Australia
- Broadcast area: Bendigo, Central Victoria
- Frequency: 91.1 MHz FM

Programming
- Format: Talk

Ownership
- Owner: Australian Broadcasting Corporation

History
- First air date: 1993

Technical information
- Transmitter coordinates: 36°44′55.30″S 144°17′31.03″E
- Repeater: FM: 106.7 MHz Bendigo (through Phoenix FM)

Links
- Website: https://www.abc.net.au/centralvic/

ABC Central Victoria (call sign: 3ABCRR) is an ABC Local Radio station based in Bendigo, Victoria. The station opened in January 1993 and covers Bendigo, Echuca, St Arnaud and Kyneton.

The station's local programming includes a breakfast show presented by Jonathan Ridnell on weekdays and Megan Spencer on Saturdays, and a weekday morning program hosted by Fiona Parker (also heard on ABC Western Victoria and ABC Mildura Swan Hill).

On 9th January 2026, the station's transmitter site at Mt Alexander was damaged in the Victorian bushfires, causing the station to go off-air terrestrially. Community radio station Phoenix FM, which was not affected by this, immediately suspended normal programming and became a repeater of ABC Central Victoria for emergency information.

== See also ==
- List of radio stations in Australia
