= ABC South West Victoria =

Australia
- Broadcast area: South West Victoria
- Frequencies: 1602 AM (Warrnambool); 94.1 FM (Hamilton); 96.9 FM (Portland

Programming
- Format: Talk

Ownership
- Owner: Australian Broadcasting Corporation

Technical information
- Power: 250W AM Warrnambool; 2.6 kW (FM in Portland, Victoria); 80 kW (FM in Southwest Victoria (Australia) local)
- Transmitter coordinates: 38°22′56.05″S 142°28′51.75″E

Links
- Website: abc.net.au/southwestvic/

ABC South West Victoria (call sign: 3WL) is an ABC Local Radio station based in Warrnambool, Victoria.
