= List of radio station callsigns in the Northern Territory =

The following is a list of Australian radio station callsigns beginning with the number 8, indicating radio stations in the Northern Territory.

Callsign	Area served	Frequency	Band	On-air ID	Purpose	Site
8ABCFM	Northern Territory	various	FM	ABC Classic FM	National	
8ABCRN	Northern Territory	various	FM	ABC Radio National	National	
8ABCRR	Northern Territory	various	FM	ABC Local Radio	National	
8ACR	Remote Aboriginal communities	various	FM	National Indigenous Radio Service	Community	
8AL	Alice Springs	0783	AM	ABC Alice Springs	National	
8CCC	Alice Springs	102.1	FM	8CCC	Community	
8DDD	Darwin	105.7	FM	ABC Darwin	National	
8EAR	Nhulunbuy	106.9	FM	Gove FM	Community	
8GGG	Darwin	097.7	FM	Darwin's 97 Seven	Community	
8GO	Nhulunbuy	0990	AM	ABC Darwin	National	
8HA	Alice Springs	0900	AM	8HA	Commercial	
8HOT	Darwin	100.1	FM	Hot 100	Commercial	
8JB	Jabiru	0747	AM	ABC Darwin	National	
8JJJ	Northern Territory	various	FM	Triple J	National	
8KIN	Central Zone	various	FM	CAAMA Radio	Community	
8KNB	Darwin	094.5	FM	Radio Larrakia	Community	
8KTR	Katherine	101.3	FM	Katherine FM	Community	
8MAB	Borroloola	102.9	FM	8MAB	Community	
8MIX	Darwin	104.9	FM	Mix 104.9	Commercial	
8PB	Northern Territory	various	AM	ABC NewsRadio	National	
8PNN	Northern Territory	various	FM	ABC NewsRadio	National	
8RN	Northern Territory	various	AM	ABC Radio National	National	
8SAT	Remote Commercial Radio Service Central Zone	various	FM	Flow FM	Commercial	
8SBSFM	Darwin	100.9	FM	SBS Radio	National	
8SUN	Alice Springs	096.9	FM	Sun FM	Commercial	
8TOP	Darwin	104.1	FM	Territory FM	Community	
ARDS	Darwin, East Arnhem Land	88.9, Various	FM	Yolngu Radio	TCBL	

== Defunct Callsigns ==
Callsign	Area served	Frequency	Band	Fate	Freq currently	Purpose
5AL	Alice Springs	1530	AM	Changed call to 8AL in 1960	8AL (783 kHz)	National
5DR	Darwin	1500	AM	Changed call to 8DR in 1960	see 8DR	National
8DN	Darwin	1242	AM	Shut down in 1992	8TAB (HPON)	Commercial
8DR	Darwin	0657	AM	Became a RN station when 8DDD signed on in 1989; Changed call to 8RN in 1991	8RN	National
8EZY	Darwin	104.9	FM	Changed call to 8MIX in 1998	8MIX	Commercial
8KN	Katherine	0639	AM	Moved to FM 106.1 in 1990s as 8ABCRR	8RN	National
8TC	Tennant Creek	0684	AM	Moved to FM 106.1 in 1991 as 8ABCRR	8RN	National
