= List of radio station callsigns in the Australian Capital Territory =

The following is a list of Australian radio station callsigns beginning with the number 1, indicating a radio station in the Australian Capital Territory.

Callsign	Area served	Frequency	Band	On-air ID	Purpose	Site
1ART	Canberra	092.7	FM	ArtSound	Community	
1CBR	Canberra	106.3	FM	Mix 106.3	Commercial	
1CMS	Canberra	091.1	FM	CMS	Community	
1RPH	Canberra	1125	AM	1RPH	Community	
1SBS	Canberra	1440	AM	SBS Radio	National	
1VFM	Tuggeranong	089.5	FM	Valley FM	Community	
1WAY	Canberra	091.9	FM	1WAY FM	Community	
1XXR	Canberra	098.3	FM	2XX	Community	
2ABCFM	Canberra	102.3	FM	ABC Classic FM	National	
2CA	Canberra	1053	AM	2CA	Commercial	
2CC	Canberra	1206	AM	2CC	Commercial	
2CN	Canberra	0666	AM	ABC Radio Canberra	National	
2JJJ	Canberra	101.5	FM	Triple J	National	
2PNN	Canberra	103.9	FM	ABC NewsRadio	National	
2RN	Canberra	0846	AM	ABC Radio National	National	
2ROC	Canberra	104.7	FM	Hit104.7	Commercial	
2SBSFM	Canberra	105.5	FM	SBS Radio	National	
1A12	Belconnen	87.8	FM	UCFM	Community	[18]

== Defunct Callsigns ==
Callsign	Area served	Frequency	Band	Fate	Freq currently	Purpose
1SSS	Canberra	103.9	FM	Shut down in 2003	2PNN	Community
2CY	Canberra	0846	AM	Changed call to 2RN in 1991	2RN	National
2KIX	Canberra	106.3	FM	Changed call to 1CBR in 1994	1CBR	Commercial
2XX	Canberra	1008	AM	Moved to FM in 2000 as 1XXR	2KY (HPON)	Community
