= Call signs in Australia =

This page intentionally has no description

Dial from a transistorised mains operated Calstan radio, circa 1960s

Call signs in Australia are allocated by the Australian Communications and Media Authority and are unique for each broadcast station. The use of callsigns on-air in both radio and television in Australia is optional, so many stations used other on-air identifications. Australian broadcast stations officially have the prefix VL- and originally all callsigns used that format, but since Australia has no nearby neighbours, this prefix is no longer used except in an international context.

== Call sign blocks for telecommunication ==
The International Telecommunication Union has assigned Australia the following call sign blocks for all radio communication, broadcasting or transmission:

Call sign block	
AXA–AXZ	Australia
VHA–VNZ	Australia
VZA–VZZ	Australia

While not directly related to call signs, the International Telecommunication Union (ITU) further has divided all countries assigned amateur radio prefixes into three regions; Australia is located in ITU Region 3. It is assigned ITU Zones 55, 58 and 59, with the Pacific Islands in Australian jurisdiction in Zone 60.

== Call signs for radio ==
All radio call signs begin with a single-digit number indicating the state or territory, followed by two or three letters. In most cases, two letters are used for AM stations and three for FM, but there are some exceptions, such as 5UV in Adelaide, which broadcasts on an FM frequency, and 3RPH in Melbourne, which broadcasts on an AM frequency. While some AM stations retained their old call signs when moving to FM, most add an extra letter to the call sign. For instance, when 7HO Hobart became an FM station, it adopted the callsign 7HHO.

Certain ABC radio stations, particularly outside of metropolitan areas, may use five-letter call signs for FM stations: xABCFM for ABC Classic, xABCRN for Radio National, and xABCRR for ABC Local Radio – the x being the state number. Also, SBS FM radio stations use a five-letter call sign, xSBSFM. (Sydney and Melbourne's AM stations use 2EA and 3EA, meaning Ethnic Australia.)

There are a number of exceptions:

- For some time, two radio stations used the callsign 4CCC – a commercial station in Charleville and a community station in Warwick, both in Queensland. The Warwick station's call sign was later changed to 4SDB. In addition, a temporary community broadcaster, 4CCC Coral Coast Country Community Radio Inc, uses the name 4CCC, though it does not have a callsign.
- Rebel FM, The Breeze, and Flow FM, which have many transmitters in Regional and Remote Central and Eastern Australia, use the callsigns 4RBL, 4BRZ and 8SAT respectively, regardless of which state their transmitters are located in.
- Radio Station 1RPH Canberra, Australian Capital Territory has relay transmitters in New South Wales
- The following Victorian stations also have relay transmitters in New South Wales: 3HOT and 3RUM.
- The following New South Wales stations also have relay transmitters in Victoria: 2AAY, 2BDR and 2MOR.
- The following New South Wales stations also have relay transmitters in Queensland: 2MW and 2TEN.
- 8KIN Alice Springs, Northern Territory has a relay transmitter in Pasminco Century Mine, Queensland, and several in South Australia.
- 3MBR Murrayville, Victoria has a relay transmitter in Lameroo, South Australia.
- The Nhulunbuy, Northern Territory transmitter for triple J has the callsign 6JJJ.
- When the ACMA licensed the Norfolk Island community radio service following Norfolk Island again falling under the BSA92 circa 2022, it assigned the licensee-requested calsign VL2NI, reflecting the callsign previously assigned by the Norfolk Island administration.
- High Power Open Narrowcast ("HPONs") radio stations have no ACMA assigned call sign, though some stations use an On-air identifier which resembles a callsign (e.g. 3XY Radio Hellas in Melbourne). HPON On-air identifiers are not registered by the ACMA.
- Many Low Power Open Narrowcast ("LPONs") radio stations have ACMA assigned callsigns, but these are auto-assigned and have no further meaning. Many LPONs use On-air identifiers but these are not registered by the ACMA.
- Temporary Community Broadcast Stations ("TCBLs") have no ACMA-assigned callsigns, though some stations use an On-air identifier which resembles a callsign, especially TCBLs which previously held a long-term community licence with an ACMA-assigned callsign (e.g. 2QBN in Queanbeyan, New South Wales).
- Special Event broadcasting stations (30 day maximum licence period) have no ACMA-assigned callsigns, but must specify an On-air identifier in their licence application, though this is not otherwise registered. Again the On-air identifier may resemble a callsign.

The following are lists of Australian radio station call signs.

- List of radio station callsigns in the Australian Capital Territory
- List of radio station callsigns in New South Wales
- List of radio station callsigns in Victoria
- List of radio station callsigns in Queensland
- List of radio station callsigns in South Australia
- List of radio station callsigns in Western Australia
- List of radio station callsigns in Tasmania
- List of radio station callsigns in the Northern Territory

Australian radios usually had the positions of radio stations marked on their dials.

Australia's postcodes, introduced in 1967, use the same digit as the radio callsigns, followed by an additional three digits (eg. NSW: 2XXX, Victoria: 3XXX, etc.).

There is an urban myth that call signs were based on Australian military districts but this incorrect as the following list of military districts show: 1 = Queensland; 2 = New South Wales; 3 = Victoria; 4 = South Australia; 5 = Western Australia; 6 = Tasmania; 7 = Northern Territory; 8 = New Guinea, and Papua.

== Television call signs ==
Television station call signs often began with two letters denoting the station itself, followed by a third letter denoting the state or territory where the station is located. For example, NBN's call sign stands for Newcastle Broadcasting, New South Wales.

The third letter for TV stations in a state is the first letter of the state:

- N – New South Wales
- V – Victoria
- Q – Queensland
- S – South Australia
- W – Western Australia
- T – Tasmania

The third letter for TV stations in a territory is the first letter of the capital city:

- C – Australian Capital Territory (Canberra)
- D – Northern Territory (Darwin)

Additionally, the letter P can also be used (for Papua New Guinea, a former territory of Australia)

There are some exceptions:

- ABC Television's station in the Australian Capital Territory, ABC, has the "C" in its call sign standing for Canberra, whereas its station in the Northern Territory, ABD, has the "D" in its call sign standing for Darwin.
- SBS television stations all use SBS in their call signs, regardless of the state.
- Imparja Television uses IMP, even though they are based in Alice Springs in the Northern Territory.
- CBN and WIN also use CBN and WIN as their respective call signs for their transmitters in the Australian Capital Territory.
- CTC also uses its callsign for stations located in New South Wales.
- GLV/BCV, AMV and VTV also use their respective call signs in for their transmitters in border areas of southern New South Wales (e.g., Balranald, Deniliquin, Albury North).
- NBN, NEN and NRN stations also use their respective call signs for their transmitters located in south-east Queensland (e.g., the Gold Coast).
- Central Digital Television transmitters have the call sign CDT despite only a small fraction of its licence area covering parts of Tasmania.
- Seven Central transmitters in regional and remote central and eastern Australia use QQQ even outside Queensland.
- There is an Aboriginal Community Television station with the call sign ACT in the Northern Territory.

== Amateur radio ==
Amateur radio in Australia has its own set of call signs, managed by the Australian Communications and Media Authority (ACMA), normally starting with the prefix VK, the state identifier, and then 1,2,3, or 4 letters.

As of July 29, 2020 - the following AR callsign structure is in place in Australia:

Advanced VK$aa, VJ$a, VK$a, VL$a

Advanced/Standard/Foundation VK$aaa-VK$zzz

Repeater / Beacon VK$Raa-VK$Rzz

It is also no longer necessary to change one's callsign should the amateur move states within Australia or advance to a higher licence class.

Amateur radio or ham radio call signs are unique identifiers for the 19,500 licensed operators in Australia. Call signs are regulated internationally by the ITU as well as nationally by the Australian Communications and Media Authority (ACMA) which is Australia's regulator for broadcasting, administering spectrum use through the provisions of the Radio-communications Act 1992. ACMA is also responsible for amateur radio licensing. The Wireless Institute of Australia had the responsibility for the management of amateur station call signs from 2 March 2009 until February 2019 .

=== Amateur radio call sign assignments within Australia ===
The usual prefix for Australian amateur call signs is VK. The numeral that separates the prefix from the suffix indicates the state/territory in which the operator is licensed.

Numeral	State/territory		
0	Antarctica		
1	Australian Capital Territory		
2	New South Wales		
3	Victoria		
4	Queensland		
5	South Australia		
6	Western Australia		
7	Tasmania		
8	Northern Territory		
9	Australian External Territories	VK9C	Cocos Island
		VK9N	Norfolk Island
		VK9W	World
		VK9X	Christmas Island
		VK9L	Lord Howe Island
		VK9M	Mellish Reef

Since 1 November 2009 callsigns in the VK9 region have been treated the same as all other call areas, and individual islands are no longer designated by a special letter.

==== Operator class call signs ====
With the exception of repeaters and beacons, the ACMA removed the relationship between the first letter of a call and the type of licence as of July 29, 2020. Should someone move state they no longer need to change their call for one with their new states number in, they can retain their existing callsign.

Prior to this change, the following structure was in place:

- Advanced Licences – indicated by the following structure: VK# xx, VK# Axx, VK# Bxx, VK# Cxx, VK# Dxx, VK# Exx, VK# Fxx, VK# Gxx, VK# Ixx, VK# Jxx, VK# Kxx, VK# Oxx, VK# Sxx, VK# Txx, VK# Uxx, VK# Wxx, VK# Xxx, VK# Yxx, VK# Zxx, VK# RAN, VK2RAS, VK# WIA–WIZ (WIA), VK# GGA–GGZ (Guides Aust), VK# SAA–SDZ (Scouts Assoc.), VK7OTC, VK# IYA–IYZ (International years)
- Standard Licences – VK# Hxx, VK# Lxx, VK# Mxx, VK# Nxx, VK# Pxx, VK# Vxx
- Foundation Licences – (four-letter suffixes beginning with 'F') VK# Fxxx
- Repeater call signs – VK# Rxx
- Beacon call signs – VK# RSx, VK# RTx

==== AX prefix ====
A special event prefix of 'AX' can be substituted for 'VK' on occasions of national significance (e.g. Sydney Olympic Games) and each year on Australia Day, Anzac Day and World Information Society Day.

==== VI prefix ====
A special event prefix of 'VI' can be substituted for 'VK' on occasions of state/territory significance.

==== VJ, VK & VL Contest Only ====
Advanced class operators had the option to apply for a limited number of special 2x1 call signs. These 2x1 call signs may ONLY be used during contests. Prefixes of 'VJ', 'VK' and 'VL' were issued on October 13, 2021 for one year with an option to renew on expiry. For example, the 2x1 format of two letters (2 => VK), one numeral (x => 3), one letter (1 => Z) licence VK3Z was assigned to VK3ZGP with an official notification dated October 13, 2021.

Note: The Australian Maritime College (responsible for issuing and management of Amateur 2x1 licences) provides the current 2x1 Callsign Register via 2X1 Contest Callsigns page.

==== Overseas visiting amateurs ====
Visiting amateurs who qualify under a two-party joint agreement between Australia and their home country can use their home call sign, and attach a '/VK' after it. If a visiting amateur is issued an Australian call sign, they can combine both (e.g. VK1AAA/WA7AAA). Visiting amateurs holding a "full" callsign from a CEPT agreement (TR61/01) signing country PREFIX their home callsign with VKn/ (where n is the number for the state or territory they are in) and may operate for up to 3 months within Australia after which time application for a reciprocal licence under CEPT agreement TR61/02 is required.

=== Call sign history ===
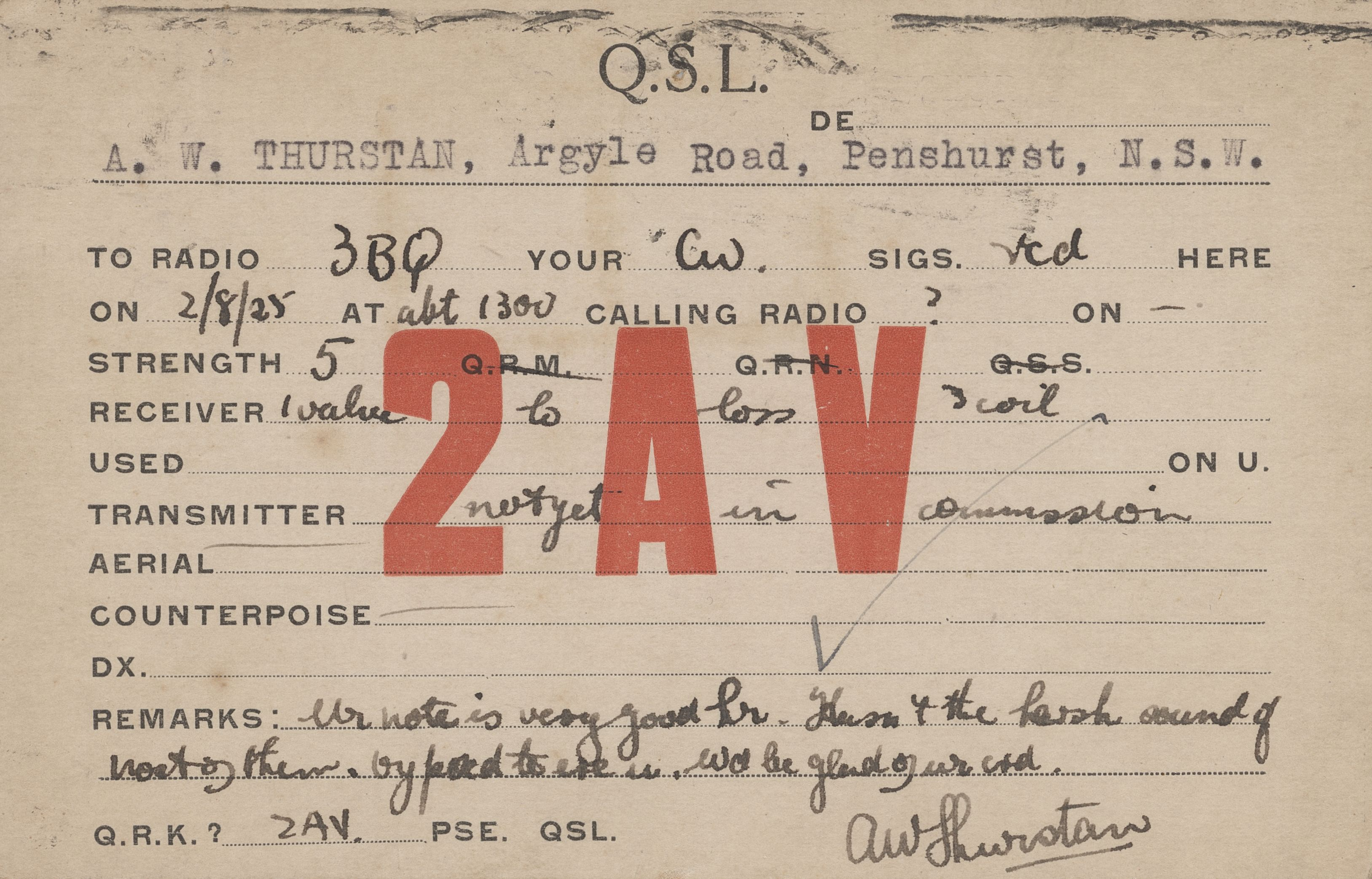
1925 QSL card illustrating absence of prefix for Australia

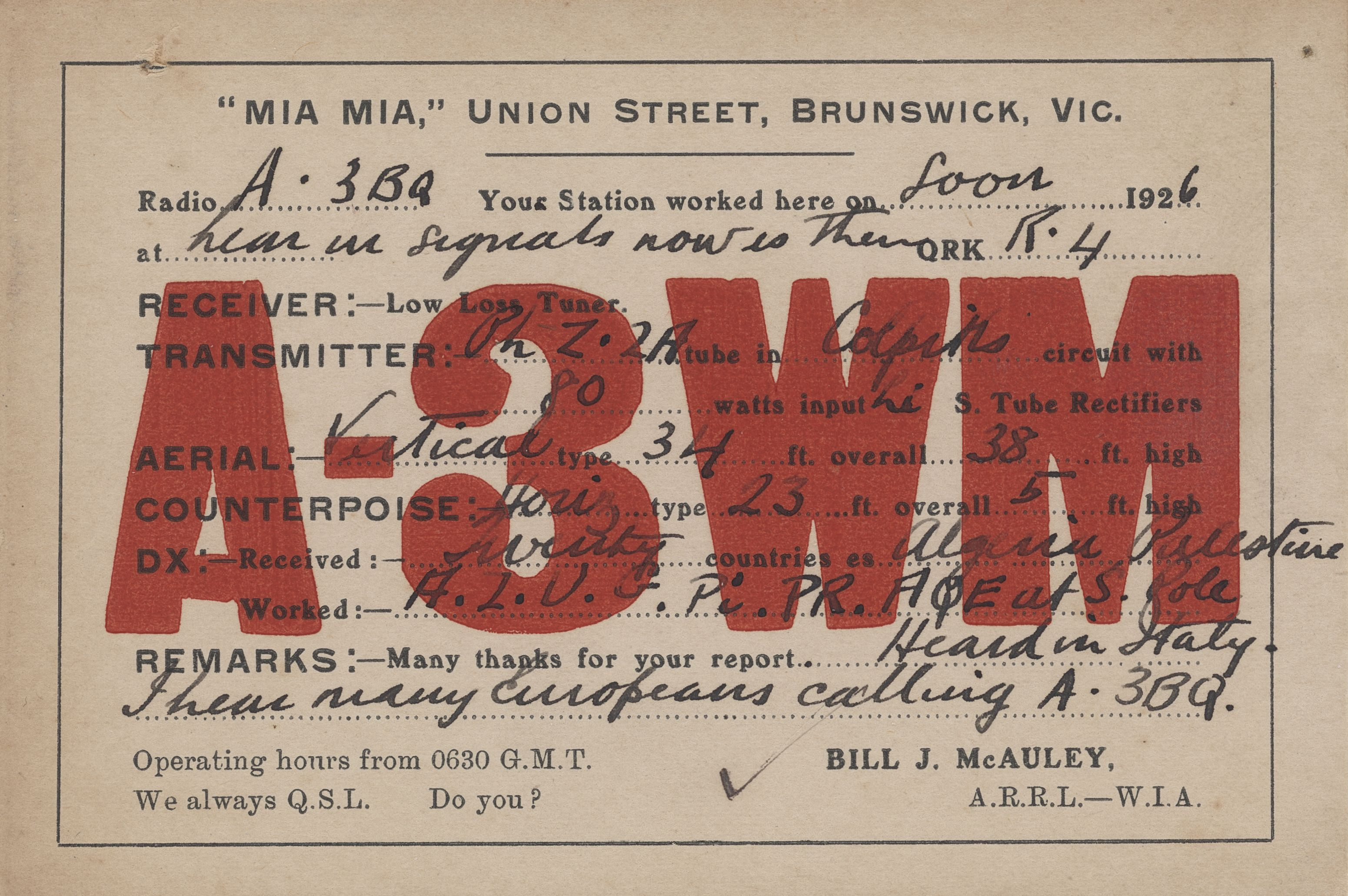
1926 QSL card illustrating use of the A prefix for Australia

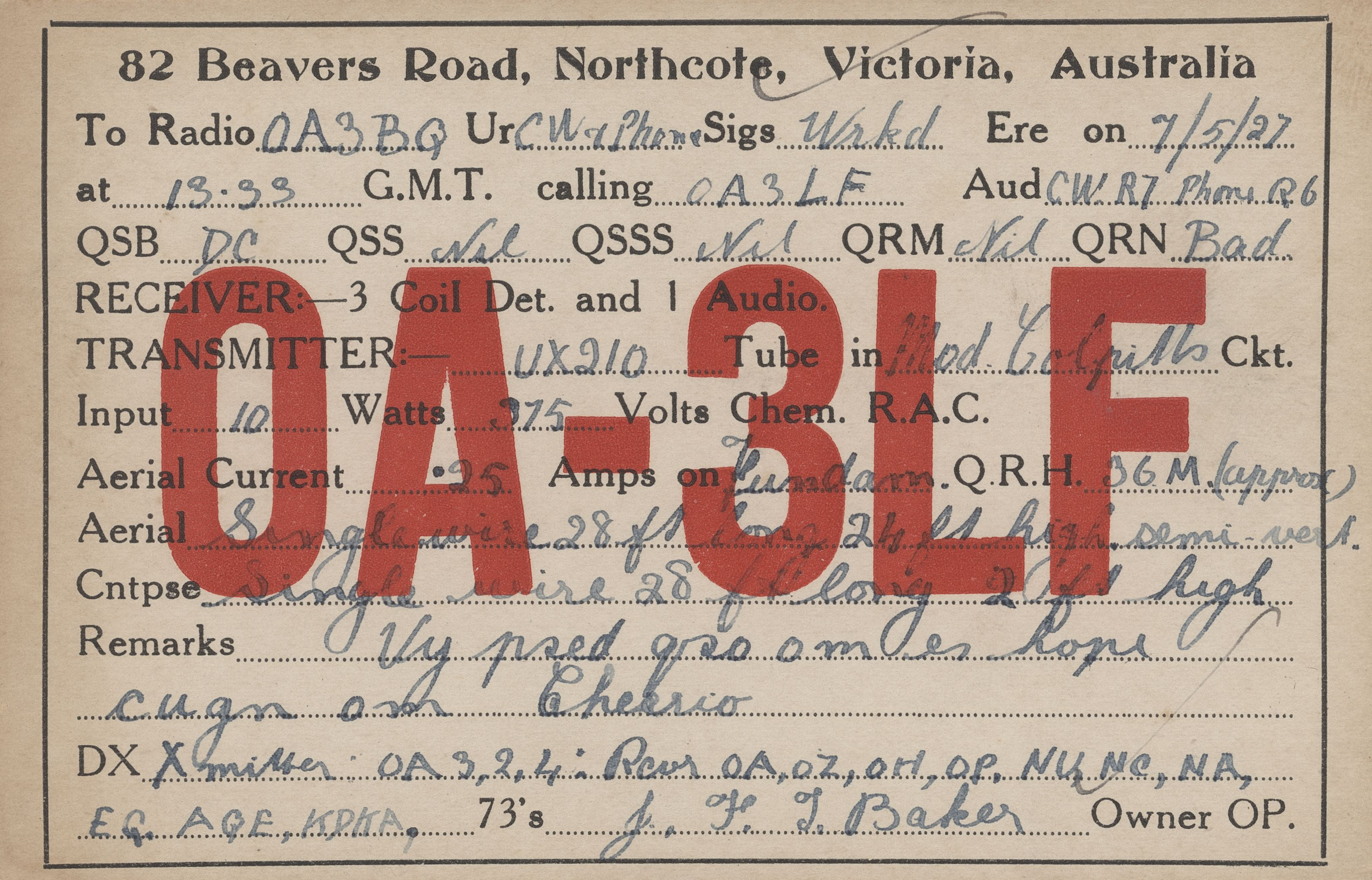
1927 QSL card illustrating use of the OA prefix for Australia

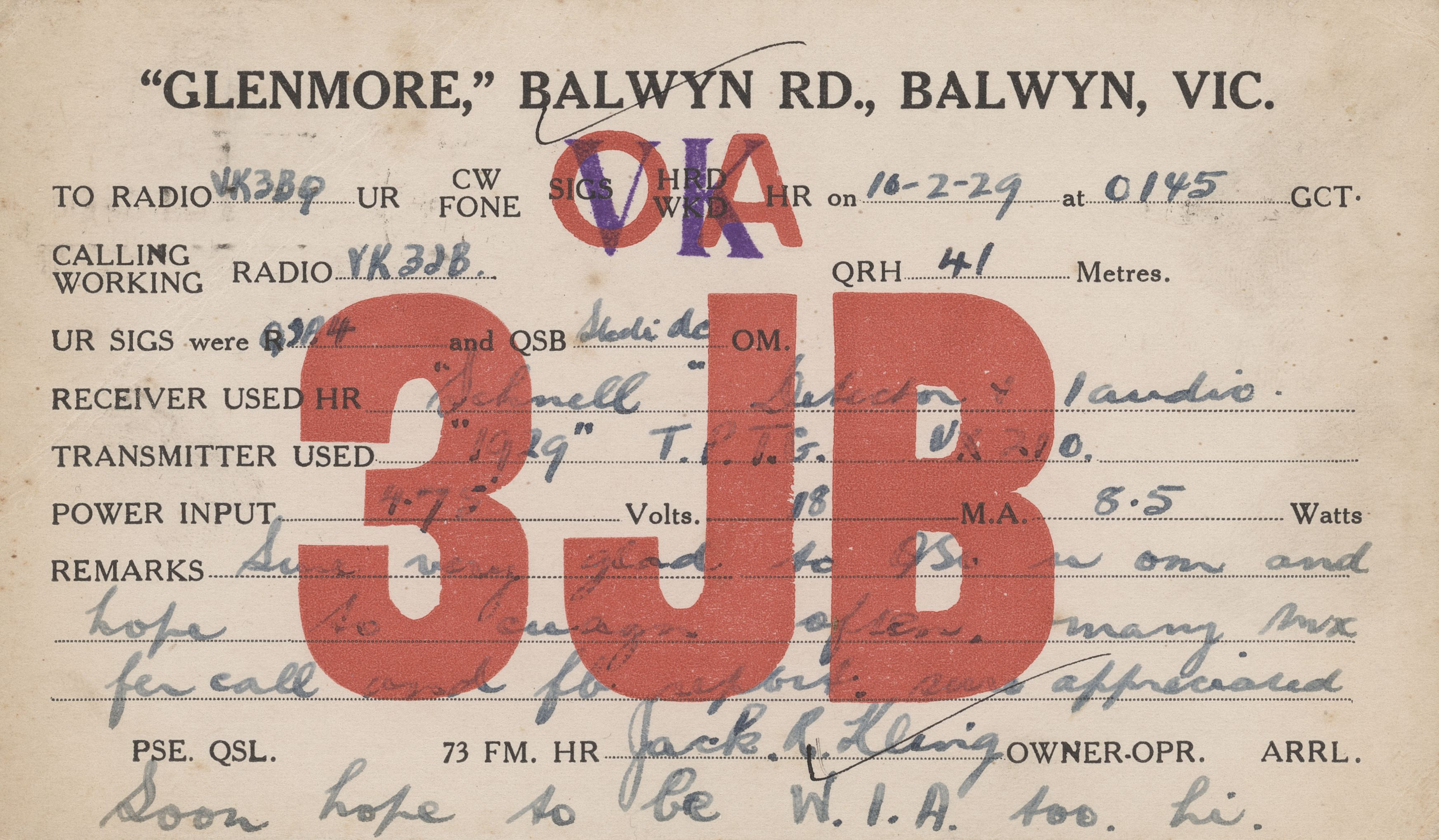
1929 QSL card printed for OA prefix overstamped VK to comply with new prefix requirement

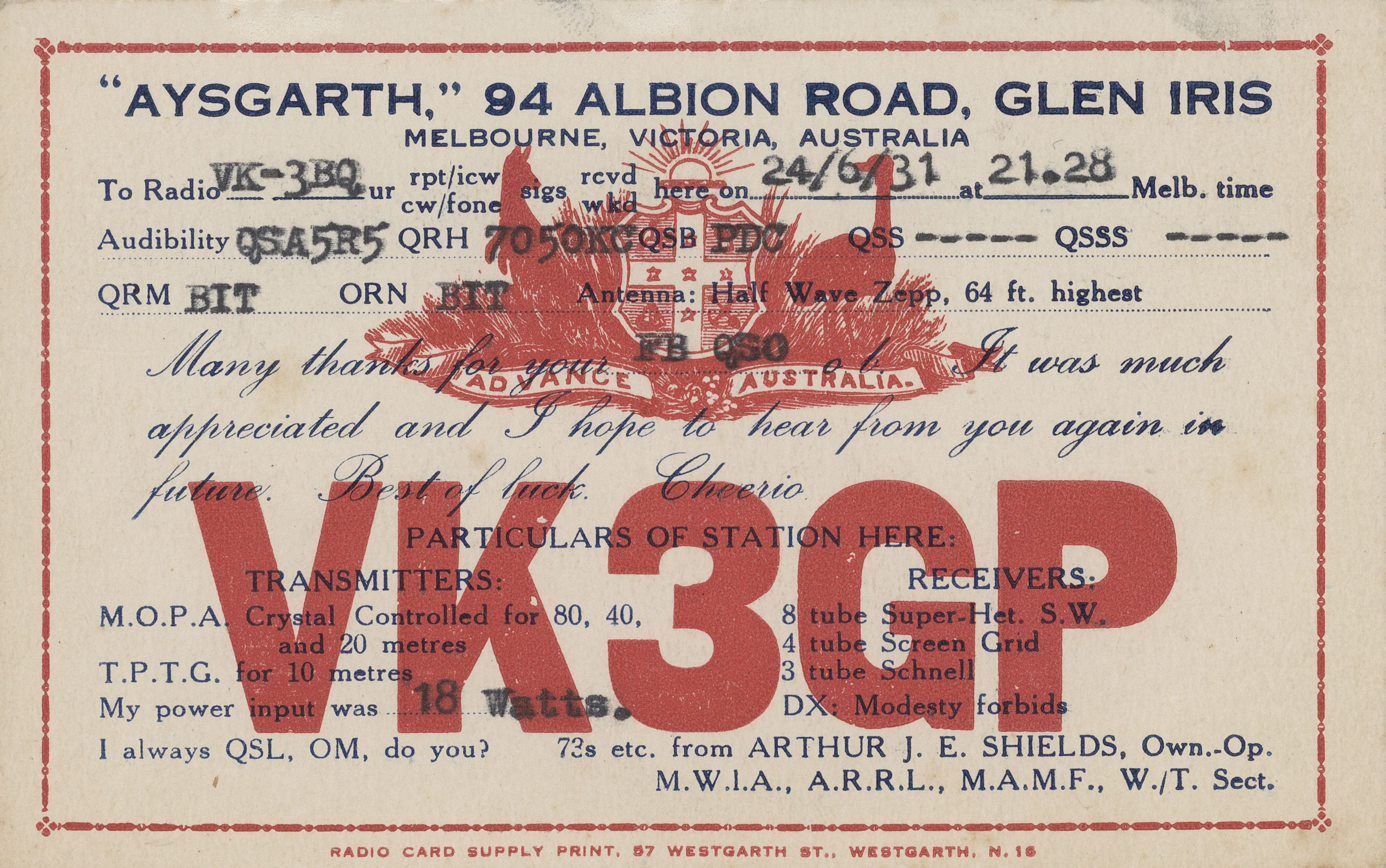
1931 QSL card illustrating use of the VK prefix for Australia

David Burger has written the definitive history of call sign allocation in the country.

Wireless experimenters were in most states by 1897, and the first list of call signs and licensees is from 1911. In 1912 the first system of a designated range for each state was issued by the PMG Department based on an XAA–XZZ block of letters. When all the three letter call signs were issued, provision was made to expand to four (e.g. XAAA). In 1914 a numeral was inserted after the 'X' to indicate the state (e.g. XAA became X1AA).

In 1927 the Washington Radiotelegraph Conference decreed that Australia should use the prefix range of VHA–VNZ for communication identification. However, amateur radio itself was not subject to this designation, and 'OA' became effective for amateurs from 1 February 1927. "O" was for Oceania and "A" for Australia. By 1929 Australia began the practice of using 'VK' for amateurs as well.

With a lack of official issuance, though, some radio experimenters continued with various formats such as XA-4CD, OA2-BH, VK.2AK and VK-4SU. There was even VK3D.L. and VK3H-W.

==== 1947 Atlantic City convention and subsequent ====
As of 19 September 1947 Australia adopted the ITU international call sign protocol and recognised amateur radio stations as valid licensees. The ITU issued Australia with the AXA–AXZ, VHA–VNZ and VZA–VZZ blocks.

VK#xx and VK#Axx call signs were issued to amateurs.

Changes within Australia happened according to this table:

Callsign	Date	State/territory/note
VK#Zxx	1954	limited to VHF and above
VK0	1955	Antarctica
P29	1972	Papua New Guinea changed from VK9
VK#Nxx	1975	Novice licence
VI, AX	1979	first use, also VL, VM, VN and VZ allowed
VK#Jxx	1995	Intermediate licence
VK#xx	2004	2-letter suffix, advanced operators
VK#Fxxx	2006	4-letter suffix, foundation licence
VK9	2006	individual islands formally identified by suffix
VK9	2009	treated the same as all other call areas

== State indicators ==
Letters and numbers used by Australian stations:

State	Radio	Television
Australian Capital Territory	1*	C (after Canberra)
New South Wales	2*	N
Victoria	3	V
Queensland	4	Q
South Australia	5	S
Western Australia	6	W
Tasmania	7	T
Northern Territory	8	D (after Darwin)
Papua New Guinea	9	P (Prior to independence in 1975), e.g., 9PM Port Moresby
Territorial Islands Lord Howe, Norfolk, Christmas, etc.	2 or 6**	W**
Antarctica	0	

* Originally, radio callsigns in the ACT had the format 2xx(x), like those in New South Wales. However, newer stations in the territory have been allocated callsigns with the format 1xxx. See List of radio station callsigns in the Australian Capital Territory for more information.

** Formerly 9. Radio stations in Lord Howe Island and Norfolk Island now use the same call sign format as New South Wales. Radio and television stations in Cocos (Keeling) Islands and Christmas Island now use the same call sign format as Western Australia.

== Call sign history in the territories ==
- Christmas Island: ZC3 (pre-1940), Japan (1940 to 1944), 9V (1945 to 1958), VK9X (since 1958).
- Cocos Keeling island: ZC2 (pre-1940), VK9Y (1955 to 1992), VK9C (since 1992).
- Papua New Guinea: VK4/VK9/P29 (since 1972).
- Nauru: VK9 then C2 (since 31 January 1968).

== See also ==
- List of radio stations in Australia
- History of broadcasting in Australia
- List of Australian television callsigns
- Amateur radio international operation
- List of New Zealand radio station call signs
- ITU prefix (amateur stations)
- Amateur radio
