= News Radio =

News Radio may refer to:

- NewsRadio, the NBC sitcom which aired from 1995–1999
- News radio or All-news radio, the all-news or news/talk radio format
- ABC News, an Australian Broadcasting Corporation radio service
- ABC News Radio, formerly ABC Radio News, a radio service in the United States
