= Call signs in Oceania =

Identifiers for broadcast and amateur radio use

Call signs in Oceania are currently voluntary in Australia radio and TV station, and were previously compulsory in New Zealand. In both countries, stations like 2GB and Newstalk ZB continue to use parts of the call signs in their branding.

The International Telecommunication Union has assigned countries in the Oceania the following call sign blocks for all radio communication, broadcasting or transmission:

== History ==
The conference held in 1927 assigned call prefixes mainly to colonial powers. The only modern Oceanic nation mentioned was an Anglo-French condominium lasting from 1906 until 1980, when the New Hebrides gained their independence as Vanuatu. New Hebrides was assigned YHA–YHZ.

The 1947 Atlantic City ITU Conference reallocated call sign blocks some developing island nations. This time New Hebrides was assigned YJA–YJZ. All other islands were assigned call prefixes according to their colonial or protectorate status.

Since 1947 and the various independence movements, new call signs were assigned by the ITU or a new host country. This is particularly true of Japanese territories occupied by the United States following WWII.

== Melanesia ==
Call sign block	Melanesia	Approx. # hams
3DN–3DZ	Fiji (incl. Conway Reef, Rotuma)	384
FK	New Caledonia (France)	266
P2A–P2Z	Papua New Guinea	230
H4A–H4Z	Solomon Islands	91
YJA–YJZ	Vanuatu	121

== Micronesia ==
Call sign block	Micronesia	Approx. # hams
V6A–V6Z	Federated States of Micronesia	192
AH2, KH2, NH2, WH2	Guam (USA)	
T3A–T3Z	Kiribati	57
V7A–V7Z	Marshall Islands	118
C2A–C2Z	Nauru	41
AH0, KH0, NH0, WH0	Northern Mariana Islands (USA)	121
T8A–T8Z	Palau	201
AH9, KH9, NH9, WH9	Wake Island (USA)	

== Polynesia ==
Call sign block	Polynesia	Approx. # hams
AH8, KH8, NH8, WH8	American Samoa (USA)	
CE0(A, E, F, Y), XQ0Y, XR0(Y, Z)	Easter Island (Chile)	
FO	French Polynesia (France)	400
AH6/7, KH6/7, NH6/7, WH6/7	Hawaii (USA)	
VP6	Pitcairn Islands (UK)	37
5WA–5WZ	Samoa	113
A3A–A3Z	Tonga	179
T2A–T2Z	Tuvalu	48

While not directly related to call signs, the International Telecommunication Union (ITU) further has divided all countries assigned amateur radio prefixes into three regions; countries and territories in Oceania are located in ITU Region 3. They cover CQ Zones 27, 28, 31, 32 and 12.

== Deleted or changed entities ==
These are the deleted or changed DXCC entities in Oceania since World War II:

Call sign block	Deleted entity	Changed to	New prefix
KR6 KR8, JR6, KA6	Okinawa (US military)	Japan	JR6RAA–JR6ZZZ, JS6
KA0	Iwo Jima (US military)	Japan	JD1
KC6	Eastern Carolines	Micronesia	V6
KC6	Western Carolines	Palau	T8
JZ0 7J1 PK5	Netherlands New Guinea	Irian Jaya (Indonesia)	YB9
VR6	Pitcairn Islands	Pitcairn Islands	VP6
KA#, KB6, KC#, KG	USA Islands	standard US prefix	KH#

== Amateur radio call signs ==
Amateur radio or ham radio call signs are unique identifiers for more than 2,500 licensed operators in the western Pacific. Call signs are regulated internationally by the ITU as well as nationally by island national entities, some of which are independent countries and others are under colonial administration. For the purposes of this article, Australia, its dependencies and New Zealand are excluded. Also not included are Oceanic Indonesian areas of Irian Jaya and the Maluku Islands.

Since call sign allocation from the International Telegraph Union is administered by national political authorities and international mandates, it is a story of colonial transition within the 20th Century.
