= Francis McLean =

Francis McLean may refer to:

- Francis McLean (politician) (1863–1926), Australian politician
- Francis McLean (British Army officer) (1717–1781)
- Francis McLean (engineer) (1904–1998), British engineer
