= ABC Radio (Australian network) =

Radio division of the Australian Broadcasting Corporation

- Logo used since 2017
- Type: Division
- Industry: Public broadcasting
- Founded: 23 November 1923; 102 years ago
- Area served: Regional and metropolitan Australia
- Parent: Australian Broadcasting Corporation
- Website: abc.net.au/listen/radio

The Australian Broadcasting Corporation (ABC) owns and operates a network of terrestrial radio stations that broadcast across Australia on AM and FM frequencies, DAB+, DVB-T, and the internet. This includes 11 national networks and 53 local stations operated through the ABC Local Radio division. The ABC also broadcasts to the Asia-Pacific region with Radio Australia.

The ABC was founded in 1932 to take over the production duties of the Australian Broadcasting Company and operation of the Postmaster-General's Department's National Broadcasting Service. Upon its establishment, it operated 12 stations across Australia, and invested in six symphony orchestras. The ABC expanded over the following decades, opening and acquiring more stations, and establishing new national networks: Radio National, ABC NewsRadio, Triple J, and ABC Classic. Consolidation in the 1990s led to the divestment of the orchestras – which spun off into Symphony Australia – and the centralisation of operations into new headquarters in Sydney and Melbourne. Regular digital radio and internet radio broadcasts commenced in 2009 and 2012, respectively.

== History ==
=== Origins ===
The first public radio station in Australia opened in Sydney on 23 November 1923 under the call sign 2SB. Other stations in Melbourne, Brisbane, Adelaide, Perth and Hobart followed. A licensing scheme administered by the Postmaster-General's Department, was soon established allowing certain stations government funding, albeit with restrictions placed on their advertising content. In 1924 the licensing system was changed. The Postmaster-General's Department collected all licence fees and broadcasters were funded as either A-Class or B-Class stations. A-Class stations received government funding and were able to take limited advertising, while B-Class stations received no government funding but could carry more advertising.

By 1925 many of the A-Class stations were in financial difficulty. A 1927 Royal Commission into wireless broadcasting recommended that radio licence fees be pooled to fund larger A-Class stations. The government established the National Broadcasting Service to take over the 12 A-Class licences as they came up for renewal from 1928. The original legislation permitted advertising, but this was removed from the Act before it came into effect. At the same time, the government created the Australian Broadcasting Company to supply programs to the new national broadcaster.

=== Establishment and early years (1932–1940) ===
Initially the Postmaster-General's Department, which operated postal and telephone services, was responsible for operating the National Broadcasting Service, although this arrangement did not have universal political support. As a result, the Australian Broadcasting Commission was established on 1 July 1932 to take over the Australian Broadcasting Company and run the National Broadcasting Service. The ABC was to be based on the BBC model, funded primarily through listener license fees, with some direct government grants. The Australian Broadcasting Commission's original twelve radio stations were:

- 2FC Sydney
- 2BL Sydney
- 3AR Melbourne
- 3LO Melbourne
- 4QG Brisbane
- 5CL Adelaide
- 6WF Perth
- 7ZL Hobart
- 2NC Newcastle
- 2CO Corowa
- 4RK Rockhampton
- 5CK Crystal Brook

These formed the basis for the present-day ABC Local Radio and Radio National networks.

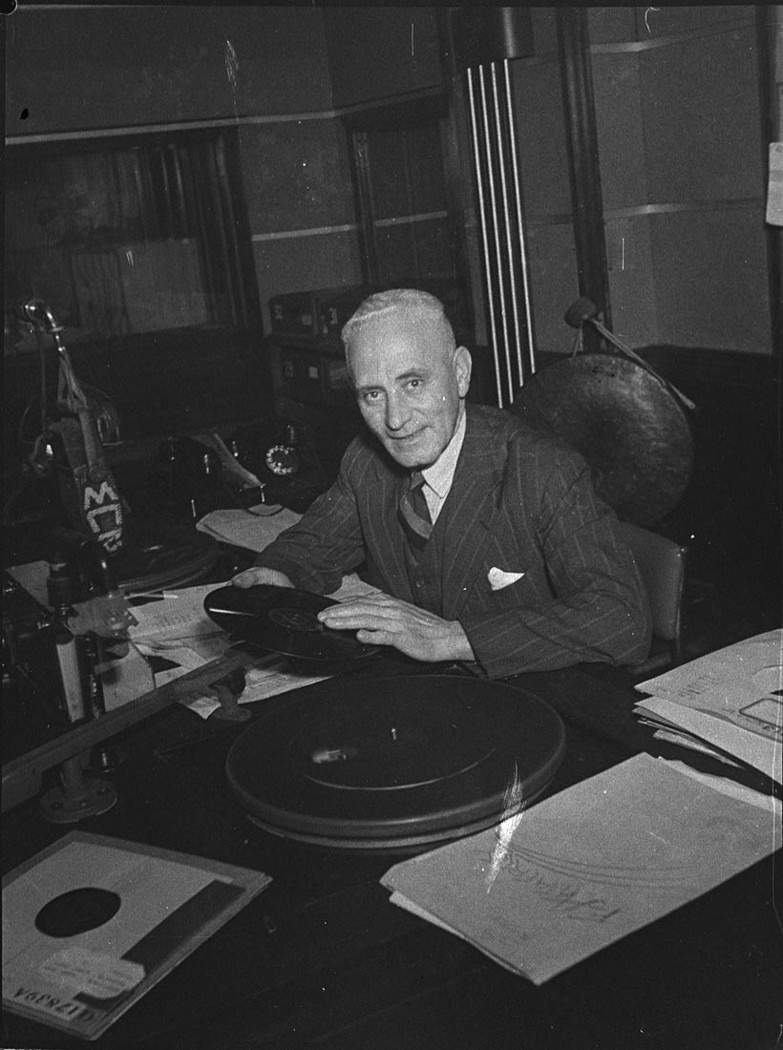
Bobby Bluegum was among the presenters on the ABC's opening-day programming.

The opening-day program included the first "Children's Session" with "Bobby Bluegum"; the first sports program, ‘Racing Notes’, with WA Ferry calling the Randwick races; ‘British Wireless News’, received by cable from London; weather; stock exchange and shipping news; the ABC Women's Association session (on ‘commonsense housekeeping’ and needlecraft); a talk on goldfish and their care; as well as ‘Morning Devotions’ and music. Conductor Sir Bernard Heinze was appointed to the position of part-time musical adviser to the ABC in 1934. In 1937, the network was further expanded with the purchase of Brisbane's 4BC. Two years later, the commission began publishing the ABC Weekly - a radio magazine promoting the ABC's local radio, and later television, programs.

Among the other early programs were the stations' famous 'synthetic' cricket broadcasts - when tests were played in England, commentators in the ABC's Sydney studios used cables from London and sound effects to recreate the match in play. In addition, all 38 of William Shakespeare's plays were performed live between 1936 and 1938. Local drama was produced, with a competition for plays and sketches from Australian authors held in 1934. Talks from prominent figures of the time such as King George V, Pope Pius XI, British Prime Minister Ramsay MacDonald, Adolf Hitler and H. G. Wells were broadcast.

During the broadcaster's first decades, programs generally consisted of music, news and current affairs, sport, drama, children's educational supplements and school broadcasts. The ABC hired its first journalist in 1934, and the service continued to be expanded, with the appointment of a federal news editor in 1936, and in 1939 a Canberra correspondent to cover national politics. Because recording technology was still relatively primitive, all ABC programs (including music) were broadcast live until 1935, when the first disc-based recorder was installed at the commission's Sydney studios. For this purpose, the ABC established broadcasting orchestras in each state, and in some centres employed choruses and dance bands.

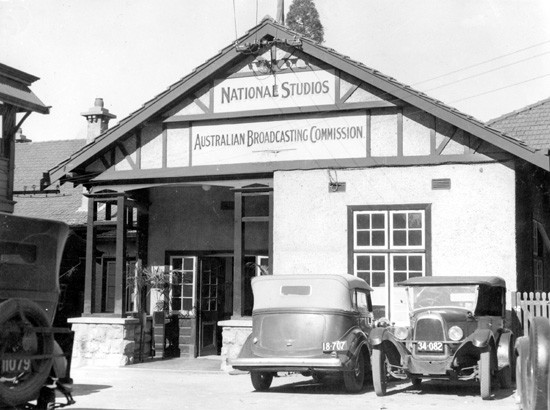
The ABC's Perth headquarters in 1937.

Throughout the early-to-mid 1930s, the stations were reformed into a cohesive broadcasting organisation through regular program relays, coordinated by a centralised bureaucracy. The Australian broadcast radio spectrum at the time was made up of the ABC and the commercial sector. Though regular program relays were in place between the ABC's stations in Sydney, Melbourne, Brisbane, Adelaide and Perth; it was not until 1936 that Hobart was connected with the mainland, through a cable under the Bass Strait. News bulletins, however, continued to be read in each state from local newspapers (by agreement with the Newspaper Proprietors Association).

=== World War II and the post-war period (1940–1969) ===
During World War II, the ABC continued to recruit staff, including a greater proportion of women to replace men who had joined the armed forces. The organisation established reporting and recording facilities in a number of overseas locations, including the Middle East, Greece and around the Asia-Pacific region. An early challenge to its independence came in June, 1940 when wartime censorship was imposed, meaning that the Department of Information (headed by Keith Murdoch) took control of the ABC's 7 p.m. nightly national news bulletin. This lasted until September, when control of the news was returned to the ABC after listeners expressed a preference for independent news presented by the commission.

On 7 January 1941, the ABC revived the Children's Session as a national program, including the Argonauts Club, which was first broadcast in 1933–34 in Melbourne. The Argonauts Club proved hugely popular with young Australians - by 1950 there were over 50,000 members, with 10,000 new members joining each year through the 1950s. The Club encouraged children's contributions of writing, music, poetry and art, and became one of the ABC's most popular programs, running six days a week for 28 years. In the late 1940s, "serious" programming such as news, current affairs, and features — early forms of what became known as documentaries — were moved to the commission's national network, with lighter entertainment programming left for the metropolitan stations. A Light Entertainment department was formed, to produce programs such as ABC Hit Parade, The Wilfrid Thomas Show, Bob Dyer's Dude Ranch and The Village Glee.

In December 1945, rural and regional affairs program The Country Hour premiered. The ABC's coverage of rural affairs was significantly enhanced by the deployment of journalists and 'extension officers' to major country areas. The increasing availability of landlines and teleprinters throughout the late 1940s allowed the organisation to gather and broadcast news and other program material with much greater efficiency than in the previous two decades. By this time, as many as 13 national news bulletins were broadcast daily.

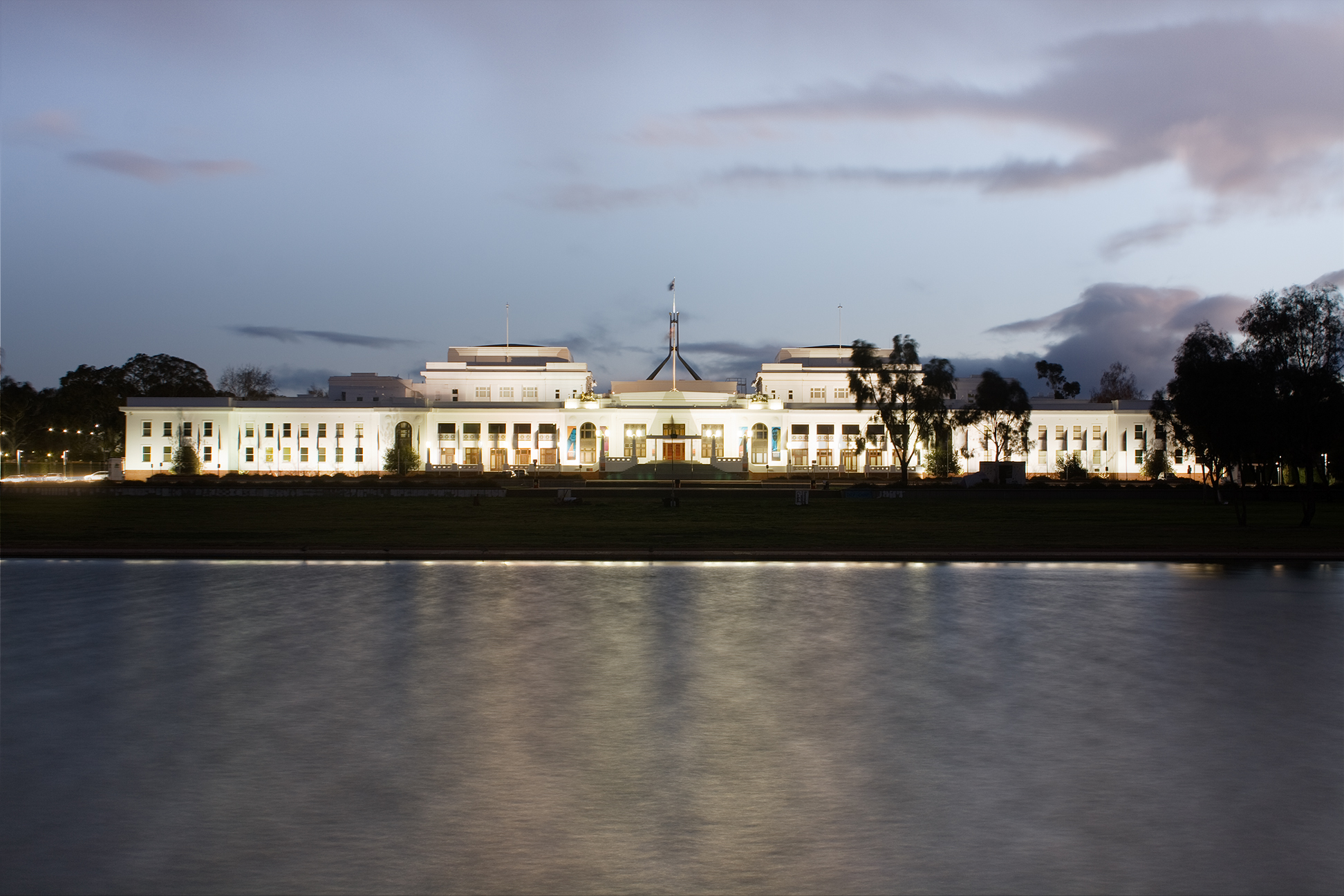
Sessions of the Parliament of Australia were first broadcast by the ABC in 1946.

Legislation passed in 1946 requiring the ABC to broadcast Parliament when in session. The first broadcast from Parliament was of Question Time on 10 July 1946. The broadcasts were put onto the interstate network; however the Commission frequently commented on the disruption this caused to its programming in its annual reports. The ABC was also required to "secure its news for broadcasting purposes within the Commonwealth by its own staff, and abroad through such overseas news agencies and other overseas sources as it desired" (along with its own foreign correspondents). The news department continued to expand, and was inaugurated on 1 June 1947.

9PA in Port Moresby was added to the ABC radio network on 1 July 1946. Additional stations were added to the network in Papua and New Guinea after this time, though they would later split from the ABC and form the National Broadcasting Corporation of Papua New Guinea in 1973, as part of preparations for the country's independence from Australia. In 1948, the ABC began operating experimental FM stations on 92.1 MHz in many capital cities. These had ceased by 1958.

=== Expansion and diversification (1970s and 1980s) ===
In 1975, the ABC introduced a 24-hour-a-day AM rock station in Sydney, 2JJ (Double Jay), which was eventually expanded into the national Triple J FM network. Also in 1975, 3ZZ Access Radio began in Melbourne. It gave access to airtime to people from many language groups that had previously rarely been heard on air. It was closed in 1977, with its assets absorbed by 3EA (later to be part of SBS). A classical music network was established in 1976 on the FM band, broadcasting from Adelaide. It was initially known as ABC-FM - referring both to its 'fine music' programming and type of radio modulation. In 1981, ABC Radio began carrying Aboriginal and Torres Strait Islander broadcasts in Alice Springs and later North Queensland, while at the same time comedy and social history units were set up, and news and current affairs output expanded.

The Australian Broadcasting Corporation Act 1983 changed the name of the organisation from the Australian Broadcasting Commission to the Australian Broadcasting Corporation effective 1 July 1983. At the same time, television and radio operations were split into two separate divisions, with an overhaul of management, finance, property and engineering undertaken.

Following this, ABC Radio was restructured significantly in 1985 - ABC Radio 1 became the ABC Metropolitan Radio network, while Radio 2 became known as Radio National (callsigns, however, were not standardised until 1990). New programs such as The World Today, Australia All Over and the Coodabeen Champions were introduced, while ABC-FM established an Australian Music Unit in 1989. Radio Australia began to focus on the Asia-Pacific region, with coverage targeted at the south west and central Pacific, south-east Asia, and north Asia. Radio Australia also carried more news coverage, with special broadcasts during the 1987 Fijian coups d'état, Tiananmen Square massacre and the Gulf War. A Concert Music department was also established in 1985 to coordinate the corporation's six symphony orchestras, which in turn received a greater level of autonomy in order to better respond to local needs. Open-air free concerts and tours, educational activities, and joint ventures with other music groups were undertaken at the time to expand the Orchestras' audience reach.

The Regional Radio stations provided local programming in Breakfast and Drive, but networked common content for most of their broadcasting hours. Some different, local market formats emerged, including the Darwin Metro 8DDD on FM105.7, and Gold Coast Regional, ABC Coast FM (4SCR), 91.7. A government initiative undertaken in 1987 known as the Second Regional Radio Network established nineteen new studios in regional areas (with an additional sixteen upgraded), as well as approximately 300 additional transmitters. At the same time, Radio National and ABC-FM were expanded into these areas. In August 1988, the Parliamentary Broadcast Network (PBN) was established under the National Metropolitan Radio Plan, as a dedicated station to carry the ABC's mandatory Parliamentary broadcasts on AM transmitters in each state capital as well as Newcastle and Canberra.

=== Divestment and consolidation (1990s) ===
Increasing pressure throughout the 1980s led the ABC to divest its orchestras in 1990. They formed Symphony Australia, an umbrella organisation that coordinates the now independent state-based orchestras (still owned by the ABC). The Sydney Symphony Orchestra was the first to be corporatised in 1996 when Sydney Symphony Orchestra Holdings Pty Ltd was formed.

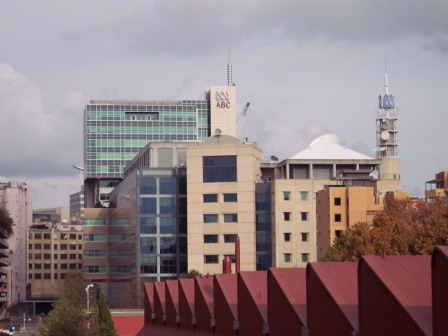
The ABC's Sydney headquarters in Ultimo.

During this period, the ABC set in motion plans to consolidate its properties and buildings in Sydney and Melbourne into single sites in each city. It was not until 1991, however that the corporation's Sydney radio and orchestral operations moved to a new building built by Leighton Contractors on a single site in the inner-city suburb of Ultimo. In Melbourne, the ABC Southbank Centre was completed in 1994, and now houses the radio division in Victoria as well as the Melbourne Symphony Orchestra.

ABC-FM relaunched in 1994 as ABC Classic FM, accompanied by major changes to the station's music and programming. On 15 August 1994, the Parliamentary and News Network (PNN) was launched, to provide a continuous news network broadcast on the same frequencies used by the PBN, when Parliament was not sitting, and in 1996, it was named "ABC NewsRadio on the Parliamentary and News Network".

By the early 1990s, all major ABC broadcasting outlets moved to 24 hour-a-day operation, while regional radio coverage in Australia was extended with 80 new transmitters. Live television broadcasts of selected parliamentary sessions started in 1990. Trials for digital radio began in the 1990s, using the popular Eureka 147 standard. At the same time, the majority of operations were upgraded to fully digitised systems for program playout and storage, as well as a word processing system adapted specifically for the needs of the division's news services. In 1995, D-Cart digital technology developed by ABC Radio attracted worldwide interest and was sold to European, North American and Asian markets. The ABC used D-Radio, the first fully digital audio system, for Triple J.

=== 21st century (2001–present) ===
Up until the mid-1990s, the majority of the local radio stations identified on-air by frequency and callsign. This was changed in the 1990s, where ABC Radio (region) or (region) FM were used to distinguish the stations. In 2000, these two almost identical networks merged as ABC Local Radio. From this point all ABC Local Radio stations ceased to identify themselves according to their callsigns or other existing names, and instead use the format (frequency) ABC (region), or ABC (region) where there are multiple frequencies broadcasting the same service. However, as the callsigns were used continuously for up to seventy years and are much shorter than the new names, many long-term listeners still use these callsigns to refer to ABC Local Radio stations.

Throughout the 2000s, ABC Radio continued to upgrade its studio and transmitter facilities. The ABC attracted large audiences for its non-commercial radio coverage of the 2000 Summer Olympics, with a range of programming across its various networks. All networks celebrated 100 years of radio in 2001 with special broadcasts marking the event and a limited edition CD released, with highlights of the ABC's output since 1932.

ABC NewsRadio began streaming its news programming online while its radio network broadcast parliament in 2002 - amongst the first of the corporation's radio networks to offer live, exclusive, streaming online. The service also expanded into the Gold Coast – the first new coverage area for the network in five years. In 2009 ABC Radio switched on DAB+ services, relaying its main channels and progressively launched new digital channels over subsequent years.

Around 2010, ABC NewsRadio became the full name of what had been "ABC NewsRadio on the Parliamentary and News Network". The ABC Radio app was launched in 2012, to be replaced by the ABC Listen app in September 2017, which included 45 ABC radio stations and audio networks. There was an organisational restructure of the ABC in 2017–18.

In October 2015 a slight restructure of programming and news updates caused controversy. From 2016, Morning programs would be folded into longer Breakfast programs, followed by a new one-hour program, Local Life. There would also be a loss of four local radio news bulletins; instead, headlines would replace two afternoon full news bulletins.

In January 2017, ABC Local Radio rebranded with a new logo, dropping the frequency number of each local radio station as part of the network's multiplatform philosophy. Also that year, 19 regional stations began to stream on the ABC Listen app. In April 2019, ABC Local Radio began a rollout of branding updates for its 44 regional bureaux, 10 regional stations dropping call signs from their names and two undergoing a significant name change to better identify their local region. In March 2026, ABC Local Radio reinstated callsign‑based branding across its on‑air presentation and visual identity for metropolitan stations.

== Stations ==
=== National stations ===
==== AM/FM stations ====
- Radio National – Generalist station broadcasting more than 60 special interest programs per week covering a range of topics including social history, comedy, health, lifestyle, poetry, book readings, religion and ethics and news and current affairs
- ABC NewsRadio – News station broadcasting federal parliamentary sittings, including every session live from the House of Representatives and the Senate, and a delayed broadcast of question time in the evening. It also broadcasts content from the ABC's international broadcast partners.
- ABC Classic – Classical music station also playlisting operas, recitals and live concerts.
- Triple J – Alternative music station catering to young Australians. It broadcasts at least 60 percent Australian music, plus specialty music programs and live music segments including Like a Version and Live at the Wireless.

List of national stations with capital city frequencies
Name	Adelaide	Brisbane	Canberra	Darwin	Hobart	Melbourne	Perth	Sydney
Radio National	729 AM	792 AM	846 AM	675 AM	585 AM	621 AM	103.3 FM	576 AM
ABC NewsRadio	972 AM	936 AM	103.9 FM	102.5 FM	747 AM	1026 AM	104.1 FM	630 AM
ABC Classic	103.9 FM	106.1 FM	102.3 FM	107.3 FM	93.9 FM	105.9 FM	97.7 FM	92.9 FM
Triple J	105.5 FM	107.7 FM	101.5 FM	103.3 FM	92.9 FM	107.5 FM	99.3 FM	105.7 FM

==== Digital stations ====
- ABC Country – Country music.
- ABC Jazz – Jazz music.
- ABC Kids Listen – Children's programming.
- ABC Sport – Sports commentary, news and talk back.
- Double J – Alternative music station aimed at the over-30 demographic.
- Triple J Unearthed – Unsigned and independent Australian artists sourced from the Unearthed website.
- Radio Australia – Indo-Pacific programming in English and Tok Pisin.

==== Internet stations ====
- ABC Classic 2 – Australian performances of classical music; un-presented.
- ABC Sport Extra – sports commentary, news and talk back.
- Triple J Hottest – playlist of tracks from all previous Triple J Hottest 100 countdowns; un-presented.

=== Local stations ===
ABC Local Radio is a national network of eight metropolitan stations in the capital cities, and 45 stations covering regional Australia, across 53 total regions. Each station broadcasts a local mix of news, current affairs, talk back, entertainment, lifestyle, sport, arts and music. Programming can either be purely local (typically on weekday mornings), broadcast from the metropolitan and regional ABC station, or simulcast across all local services across the country (typically overnight, public holidays, in the summer months and on weekends).

The metropolitan and regional stations originate most of their own programming and produce local news updates. There are local news websites for each station. When not airing local programming, the regional stations will usually simulcast the metropolitan station of their state or territory capital; the only exception is ABC Broken Hill, which simulcasts ABC Radio Adelaide because the town is on Central Time. Some programmes are aired first on Radio National, then on the ABC Local Radio network. For example, Speaking Out, hosted by Larissa Behrendt, broadcasts (as of September 2020) on Radio National on Fridays at 8:00 pm and on Local Radio on Sundays at 9:00 pm, and Conversations, hosted by Richard Fidler and Sarah Kanowski, broadcasts (as of April 2026) on Radio National on weekdays at 3:00 pm and on Local Radio on weekdays at 11:00 am.

ABC Local Radio bureaux in New South Wales and the Australian Capital Territory

==== New South Wales ====
- 702 ABC Sydney – Broadcasts to the Blue Mountains and Sydney
- ABC Broken Hill – Broadcasts to Broken Hill, Menindee and Wilcannia
- ABC Central Coast – Broadcasts to Gosford, Peats Ridge and Wyong
- ABC Central West – Broadcasts to Bathurst, Cowra and Orange
- ABC Coffs Coast – Broadcasts to Bellingen, Coffs Harbour and Dorrigo
- ABC Illawarra – Broadcasts to Bowral, Nowra and Wollongong
- ABC Mid North Coast – Broadcasts to Forster, Port Macquarie and Taree
- ABC New England North West – Broadcasts to Armidale, Moree and Tamworth
- ABC Newcastle – Broadcasts to Lake Macquarie, Port Stephens and Lower Hunter
- ABC North Coast – Broadcasts to Byron Bay, Casino and Lismore
- ABC Riverina – Broadcasts to Wagga Wagga and Griffith
- ABC South East NSW – Broadcasts to Batemans Bay, Bega and Cooma
- ABC Upper Hunter – Broadcasts to Merriwa, Muswellbrook and Scone
- ABC Western Plains – Broadcasts to Bourke, Dubbo and Mudgee

==== Australian Capital Territory ====
- 666 ABC Canberra – Broadcasts to Canberra, Queanbeyan and Yass
ABC Local Radio bureaux in Queensland

==== Queensland ====
- 612 ABC Brisbane – Broadcasts to Brisbane, Ipswich and Logan
- ABC Capricornia – Broadcasts to Emerald, Gladstone and Rockhampton
- ABC Far North – Broadcasts to Cairns, Dunk Island and Weipa
- ABC Gold Coast – Broadcasts to Coolangatta, Robina and Surfers Paradise
- ABC North Queensland – Broadcasts to Charters Towers, Ingham and Townsville
- ABC North West Queensland – Broadcasts to Hughenden, Karumba and Mount Isa
- ABC Southern Queensland – Broadcasts to Roma, Stanthorpe and Toowoomba
- ABC Sunshine Coast – Broadcasts to Maleny, Maroochydore and Noosa
- ABC Tropical North – Broadcasts to Mackay, Moranbah and Whitsunday
- ABC Western Queensland – Broadcasts to Barcaldine, Charleville and Longreach
- ABC Wide Bay – Broadcasts to Bundaberg, Hervey Bay and Maryborough

==== Northern Territory ====
- 105.7 ABC Darwin – Broadcasts to Darwin, Katherine and Palmerston
- ABC Alice Springs – Broadcasts to Alice Springs, Tennant Creek and Yulara
- ABC Katherine – Broadcasts to Katherine, Pine Creek and Tindal
ABC Local Radio bureaux in Western Australia

==== Western Australia ====
- 102.5 ABC Perth – Broadcasts to Fremantle, Joondalup and Perth
- ABC Esperance – Broadcasts to Condingup, Esperance and Salmon Gums
- ABC Goldfields – Broadcasts to Esperance, Kalgoorlie-Boulder and Leonora
- ABC Great Southern – Broadcasts to Albany, Denmark, Mt Barker, Katanning, Narrogin and Wagin
- ABC Kimberley – Broadcasts to Broome, Derby and Kununurra
- ABC Midwest & Wheatbelt – Broadcasts to Dalwallinu, Geraldton and Northam
- ABC Pilbara – Broadcasts to Carnarvon, Karratha and Port Hedland
- ABC South West WA – Broadcasts to Bunbury, Manjimup and Margaret River

==== South Australia ====
- 891 ABC Adelaide – Broadcasts to Adelaide, Murray Bridge and Victor Harbor
- ABC Eyre Peninsula – Broadcasts to Ceduna, Port Lincoln and Wudinna
- ABC North and West SA – Broadcasts to Port Augusta, Port Pirie and Whyalla
- ABC Riverland – Broadcasts to Berri, Loxton and Renmark
- ABC South East SA – Broadcasts to Millicent, Mount Gambier and Naracoorte

==== Tasmania ====
- 936 ABC Hobart – Broadcasts to Hobart, Huonville and New Norfolk
- ABC Northern Tasmania – Broadcasts to Burnie, Devonport and Launceston
ABC Local Radio bureaux in Victoria

==== Victoria ====
- 774 ABC Melbourne – Broadcasts to Frankston, Geelong and Melbourne
- ABC Ballarat – Broadcasts to Ararat, Colac and Daylesford
- ABC Central Victoria – Broadcasts to Bendigo, Castlemaine and Maryborough
- ABC Gippsland – Broadcasts to Bairnsdale, Latrobe Valley and Omeo
- ABC Goulburn Murray – Broadcasts to Albury–Wodonga, Corowa and Wangaratta
- ABC Mildura Swan Hill – Broadcasts to Kerang, Ouyen and Robinvale
- ABC Shepparton – Broadcasts to Benalla, Cobram and Echuca
- ABC South West Victoria – Broadcasts to Hamilton, Portland and Warrnambool
- ABC Wimmera – Broadcasts to Horsham, Stawell and Warracknabeal

== ABC Listen ==
ABC Listen is a audio streaming and podcast service that rebroadcasts the ABC's terrestrial stations over internet radio, and provides an on-demand digital library of programs previously broadcast on the stations. It was launched in September 2017, and offers a varying number of internet radio-exclusive stations, such as ABC Classic 2, ABC Sport Extra and Triple J Hottest.

== See also ==
- List of radio stations in Australia
