= Arnold Matters =

Australian baritone (1901 - 1990)

Arnold Hatherleigh Matters OAM (11 April 1901 – 21 September 1990) was an Australian operatic baritone and producer, whose career was mostly in England during the 1930s and 1940s. He was a mainstay of the Sadler's Wells Company in London from 1946 to 1957.

== Biography ==
Arnold Hatherleigh Matters was born in the Adelaide suburb of Malvern on 11 April 1901. His father, Richard Adams Matters, an ironmonger, and his mother, Emily Grace (née Williams), already had three children (including a son, later better known as broadcaster Frank Hatherley). Arnold was educated at Unley High School. Matters at first took up a position in the South Australian bureaucracy and was admitted as an associate of the Federal Institute of Accountants in 1925, but in his spare time pursued his interests in music and singing. He obtained a place at the Elder Conservatorium of Music at Adelaide and studied singing under Clive Carey, graduating AMUA in 1926. In due course he won the Sun Aria Prize and other coveted awards, and began to attract a good deal of attention. He was invited by Dame Nellie Melba to join her touring company, and met with such success that he decided to make music his profession.

In 1930 he abandoned his government position and went to England, at first continuing his studies in London under Johnston Douglas. He became a member of the Westminster Abbey choir and was given a good deal of solo work. But his dramatic ability, fine voice and stage presence led him towards the theatre, and in 1932 he joined the Vic-Wells Opera Company, his debut being as Valentine in Gounod's Faust at the Old Vic in 1933. He soon made himself established as a popular Figaro, Don Alfonso, Silvio, Escamillo, and Sharpless.

He afterwards found his favourite role as Hans Sachs in Die Meistersinger von Nürnberg, and also became known in the title role in Falstaff, as Dr Bartolo, Don Giovanni, the Die Walküre Wotan and as Wolfram in Tannhäuser. In 1935, 1938 and 1939 he joined the British singers in the international seasons at Covent Garden, where he was successful as Kurwenal in Tristan und Isolde, with Eva Turner as Isolde.

During the war he returned to Australia and maintained a very successful concert and opera career there. In 1946 he was invited back to England, to Sadler's Wells, where he resumed his regular position in the company, also making occasional guest appearances at Covent Garden. He was especially effective as Scarpia, and also as Simone Boccanegra in the English revival opposite Howell Glynne's Fiesco, and recorded excerpts of this work at the time. He was also a most effective Papageno, Rigoletto, Don Carlo, Iago, Germont père, Conte di Luna, Amonasro, Pizarro and Governor, Varlaam, Kecal, Peter, Figaro and Almaviva, Mephistopheles, Telramund, and the Dutchman.

In 1949 he took the role of Eochaidh, the King, in the revival of Rutland Boughton's The Immortal Hour at the People's Palace. At Covent Garden on 26 April 1951 he created the role of the Pilgrim in Ralph Vaughan Williams's The Pilgrim's Progress, and in 1953 that of Cecil in Benjamin Britten's Gloriana. In October 1954 he created the role of Sir William Hamilton in Lennox Berkeley's opera Nelson at Sadler's Wells.

Matters returned to Adelaide in 1957 where he produced operas for the Australian Elizabethan Theatre Trust and taught at the Elder Conservatorium. He was awarded the Medal of the Order of Australia in the 1985 Australia Day Honours for "service to music, particularly as an opera singer and teacher". He died on 21 September 1990, a childless widower, in Adelaide.

== Sources ==
- G. Davidson, Opera Biographies (Werner Laurie, London 1954).
- H. Rosenthal and J Warrack, Concise Oxford Dictionary of Opera (London 1974 printing).
