= 1CMS =

Australian multilingual community radio station

Canberra, Australian Capital Territory; Australia
- Broadcast area: Canberra RA1 ()
- Frequency: 91.1 MHz
- Branding: CMS

Programming
- Format: Multilingual

Ownership
- Owner: Ethnic Broadcasters Council of the Australian Capital Territory and Surrounding Districts, Inc.

History
- First air date: 15 July 2000
- Call sign meaning: 1 for the Australian Capital Territory plus Canberra Multicultural Service

Technical information
- ERP: 20,000 watts
- HAAT: 332 m
- Transmitter coordinates: 35°16′32″S 149°5′52″E

Links
- Website: Official website

FM 91.1 CMS (callsign 1CMS) is a multilingual community radio station broadcasting to Canberra, in languages other than English, from studios in the suburb of Holder. CMS is a member of the National Ethnic and Multicultural Broadcasters Council (NEMBC) and the Community Broadcasting Association of Australia (CBAA).

The policy of CMS is to encourage all languages to broadcast for at least an hour each week, providing time on an equitable basis. Programming priorities include youth, women and emerging communities.

== History ==
The EBC (Ethnic Broadcasters Council) as it was then called, started broadcasting by purchasing airtime on community station 2XX. Up to 25 language groups were broadcasting for half an hour each per week during the 1980s. Discontent in the early 1990s saw the EBC and 2XX sever ties with each other. EBC were off the air until August 1992 when they were able to apply for their own test broadcast licence. EBC were back on air on Tuesdays and Fridays using the facilities of ArtSound FM.

In 1999 the EBC received a full-time test licence to broadcast on 103.5 FM. Soon after the on air identity was changed to Canberra Multicultural Service and the frequency moved to the present 91.1 FM. Then an application for a full broadcasting licence was applied for. This was granted on 15 June 2001.

== Current ==
FM 91.1 CMS now has programming in around 30 languages. The station broadcasts live from the Canberra Multicultural Festival each year. Internet streaming was introduced in 2008.

== Programming ==
As of 2008, the station broadcasts in the following languages:

- Bosnian
- Cantonese
- Chilean Spanish
- Croatian
- Cypriot Greek
- Dutch
- Persian
- Belgian Dutch (Flemish)
- French
- German
- Greek
- Hindi
- Indonesian
- Italian
- Lao
- Macedonian
- Mandarin
- Motu/Pigin
- Polish
- Samoan
- Serbian
- Sinhalese
- Slovenian
- Spanish
- Swiss German
- Tamil
- Telugu
- Thai
- Tongan
- Urdu
- Vietnamese

Satellite programming from Deutsche Welle, Radio France International and the National Indigenous Radio Service is also carried.

== See also ==
- List of radio stations in Australia
