= ABC Broken Hill =

Coordinates: 31°57′S 141°27′E

Broken Hill, New South Wales; Australia
- Broadcast area: Broken Hill
- Frequency: 999 kHz AM

Programming
- Format: Talk

Ownership
- Owner: Australian Broadcasting Corporation

History
- First air date: 29 July 1948

Links
- Website: https://www.abc.net.au/brokenhill/

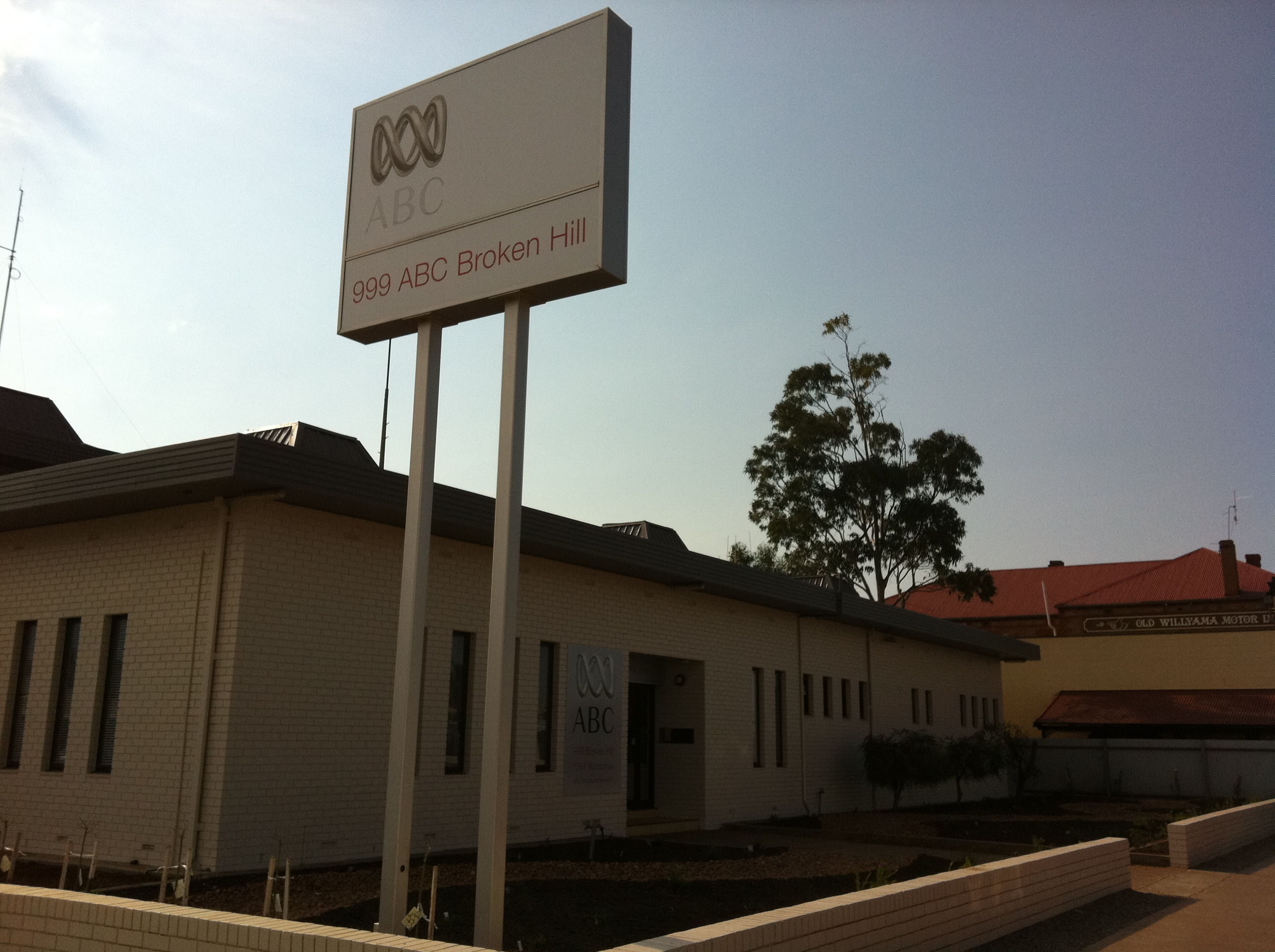
ABC Broken Hill studios

ABC Broken Hill is an ABC Local Radio station based in Broken Hill and broadcasting to the surrounding outback region in New South Wales, including the towns of Menindee, White Cliffs and Silverton.

Unlike the rest of New South Wales, Broken Hill operates as part of South Australia's ABC Local Radio network, and takes network feeds from ABC Radio Adelaide whenever it isn't producing its own content. This is because Broken Hill is on Central Time, while the rest of NSW is on Eastern Time.

== History ==
The station went to air in the evening 29 July 1948 as station 2NB/760 AM. A ceremony was held in honour of the opening at the Broken Hill Town Hall and was attended by Acting Mayor Alderman W. F. Riddiford, Local Federal Member for Parliament J. J. Clark, Postmaster General Senator Cameron and Vice-Chairman of the ABC Mr E. R. Dawe, who stated that "2NB would bring programs nearer to the local Broken Hill people" and that "the Commission hoped that the people of Broken Hill would be better informed".

The Quartet Club, Zinc Corporation Orchestra, Philharmonic Society, and Barrier Industrial Unions Band provided the music entertainment that night. During the station's first year, there were only two staff, Jeff Medwell and Frank Scott.

The original studios on 194 Argent Street were completely destroyed by a fire at 1:06 AM on 1 February 1966, which caused around 6000 pounds/10700 dollars of damage. New studios were built at 454 Argent Street and opened on 23 February 1971 by ABC Chairman Robert Madgwick and the station thus resumed broadcasts. The station celebrated 50 years of broadcasting in 1998.

== Local programming ==
ABC Broken Hill carries locally produced radio programming from 6:15 to 11:00 every weekday morning, with local ABC News bulletins at 6:30, 7:30, 8:30 and midday.

- Breakfast 6:15am to 10:00am – presented by Andrew Schmidt
- Mornings 10:00am to 11:00am – presented by Marcus Wilson
- Saturday Breakfast 5:30am to 7:45am – presented by Ron Josephs
- Saturday Opening Serve 8:30am to 9:00am – presented by Alex Page

When local programs are not being broadcast, programs are relayed from either ABC Adelaide or ABC Sydney.

== Staffing ==
The Chief of Staff at ABC Broken Hill is Andrew Schmidt. The bureau is staffed by a team of three multiplatform news reporters, a rural reporter, a features reporter, a radio presenter, a radio producer and several casual staff. Journalists file stories to local platforms like the breakfast program and social media, as well as television, radio and online destinations across the ABC network.

== Coverage area ==
ABC Broken Hill covers issues and events across a large portion of outback NSW, mostly contained with the Broken Hill City Council, Wentworth Shire Council, Central Darling Shire Council and unincorporated areas.

== See also ==
- List of radio stations in Australia
