= ABC Goldfields =

ABC Goldfields–Esperance
Australia
- Broadcast area: Goldfields–Esperance
- Frequencies: 648 kHz AM (Goldfields); 837 kHz AM (Esperance)

Programming
- Format: Talk

Ownership
- Owner: Australian Broadcasting Corporation

History
- First air date: 10 December 1936

Technical information
- Transmitter coordinates: 30°45′01.60″S 121°28′12.32″E

Links
- Website: https://www.abc.net.au/goldfields/

ABC Goldfields–Esperance is an ABC Local Radio station based in Kalgoorlie. The station broadcasts to the Goldfields–Esperance region of Western Australia, including the towns of Esperance, Coolgardie, Kambalda and Norseman.

The station was formally opened by the then State Member for Kalgoorlie, Herbert Henry Styants, on 10 December 1936.

The station began broadcasting as 6GF from the first floor of the Post Office building in Hannan Street.

Later the station moved its studios to the Salvation Army Citadel, prior to moving to premises on the corner of Porter and Brookman Streets. The station is currently located at 353 Hannan Street.

The transmitter at Esperance (callsign 6ED) was switched on in 1966. There are also a number of low power FM transmitters.

When local programs are not broadcast the station is a relay of 720 ABC Perth.

== See also ==
- List of radio stations in Australia
