= ABC Sunshine Coast =

Coordinates: 26.652311°S 153.090127°E

- Australia
- Broadcast area: Sunshine Coast and Gympie
- Frequencies: 90.3 MHz FM Sunshine Coast; 95.3 MHz FM Gympie

Programming
- Format: Talk

Ownership
- Owner: Australian Broadcasting Corporation

History
- First air date: 14 December 1992

Links
- Website: https://www.abc.net.au/sunshine/

ABC Sunshine Coast is an ABC Local Radio station based in Maroochydore. The station broadcasts to the Sunshine Coast region of Queensland. This includes the towns of Nambour, Caloundra, Noosa and Gympie.

It was originally set-up to target the youth market and broadcast to the Sunshine Coast from a studio at ABC Radio Brisbane. The station is now a news, current affairs and adult contemporary music station.

Like most other ABC Local Radio stations throughout regional Queensland, ABC Sunshine Coast offers local breakfast and morning programs. All other programming originates from metropolitan ABC stations, such as the evenings programs which are broadcast from ABC Radio Brisbane.

In late September 2014, to fall in line with most ABC Local Radio stations in Queensland, ABC Sunshine Coast began broadcasting their own local edition of The Rural Report, broadcast at 6:20 am during the local breakfast program, presented by a Sunshine Coast-based rural reporter. Upon the launch of the local Rural Report, ABC Sunshine Coast also began taking statewide rural affairs program, The Queensland Country Hour, between midday and 1 pm.

== See also ==
- List of radio stations in Australia
