= Hot 100 (Darwin radio station) =

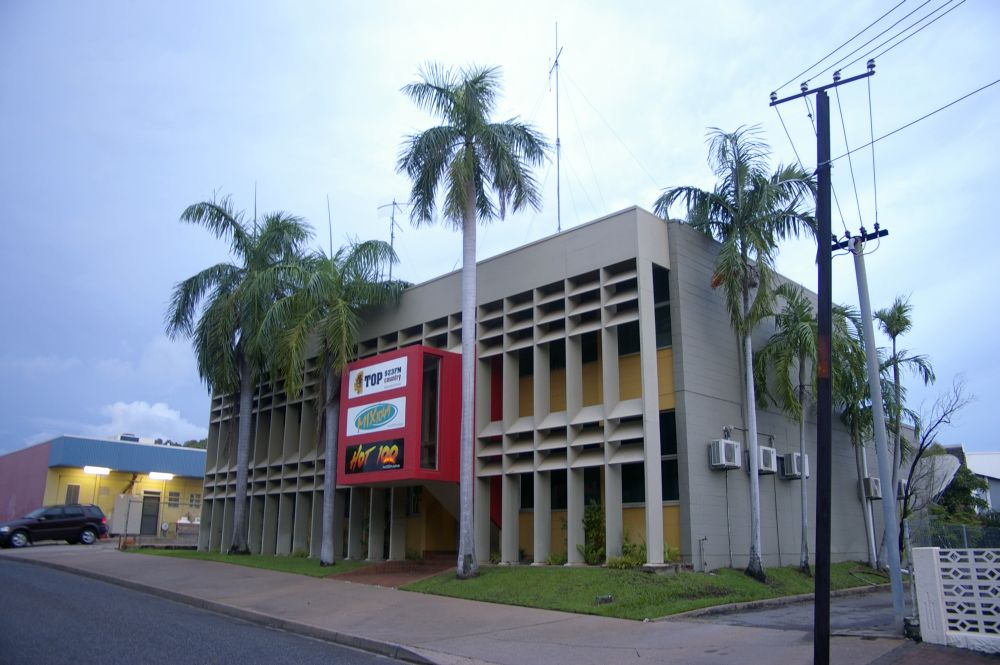
- The Hot 100 studio, shared with Mix 104.9 and KIX Country 92.3

Darwin, Northern Territory; Australia
- Broadcast area: Top End
- Frequency: 100.1 MHz
- Branding: Hot 100

Programming
- Language: English
- Format: Hot adult contemporary

Ownership
- Owner: ARN; (Northern Territory Broadcasters Pty Ltd)
- Sister stations: Mix 104.9, KIX Country 92.3

History
- First air date: 1 July 1991
- Call sign meaning: 8HOT 100

Technical information
- Licensing authority: ACMA
- Transmitter coordinates: 12°24′52.06″S 130°58′9.41″E
- Repeaters: 102.1 MHz Adelaide River; 98.1 MHz Katherine; 90.1 MHz Jabiru

Links
- Website: www.hot100fm.com.au

Hot 100 (call sign: 8HOT) is a CHR-formatted commercial radio station in Darwin, Northern Territory, Australia. The station began broadcasting on 1 July 1991 and has a relay in Katherine and Jabiru.

== History ==
While campaigning for the 2019 Australian federal election, Opposition Leader Bill Shorten was challenged to a thumb war on live radio on the Danii & Jake Show, which is broadcast on Hot 100.

In November 2021, Hot 100, along with other stations owned by Grant Broadcasters, were acquired by the Australian Radio Network. This deal will allow Grant's stations, including Hot 100, to access ARN's iHeartRadio platform in regional areas. The deal was finalized on 4 January 2022. It is expected Hot 100 will integrate with ARN's KIIS Network, but will retain its current name according to the press release from ARN. Local shows on Hot 100 consist of The Sam & Ant Show (Sam Mansfield & Ant Johnston), Workdays With Xy (Xylon 'Xy' McEwan), and Arvos With Jac (Jac Cowan).
