= Mix 104.9 =

Mix 104.9 (8MIX)

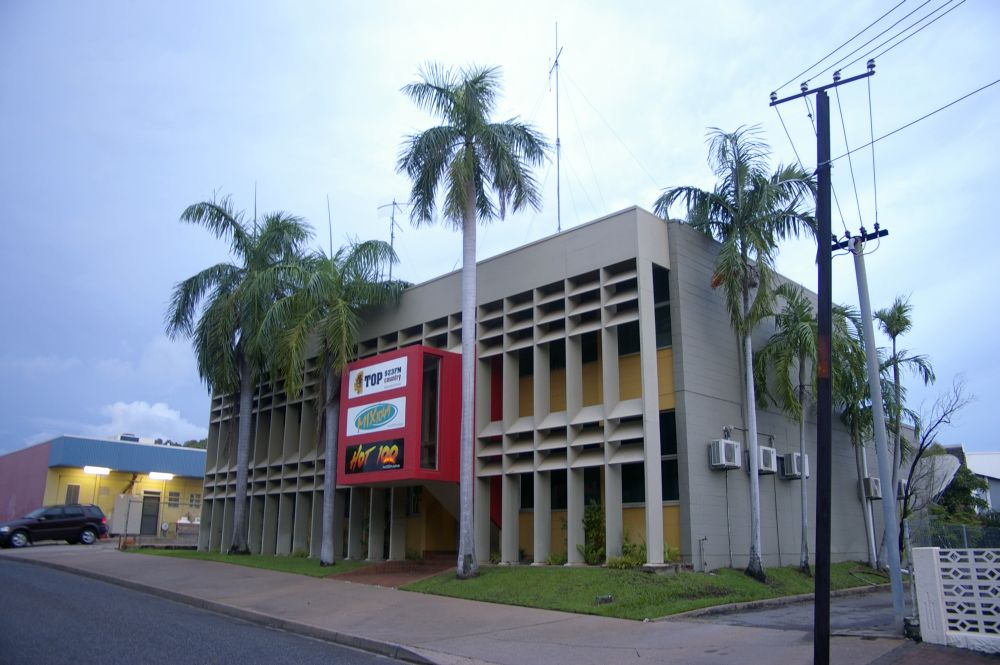
- The Mix 104.9 studio, shared with Hot 100 and KIX Country 92.3

Darwin, Northern Territory; Australia
- Broadcast area: Northern Territory
- Frequency: 104.9 MHz FM

Programming
- Language: English
- Format: Full-service; Adult contemporary

Ownership
- Owner: ARN Regional; (Northern Territory Broadcasters Pty Ltd)
- Sister stations: Hot 100; KIX Country 92.3; Classic Rock Digital

History
- First air date: 1997

Technical information
- Licensing authority: ACMA
- Transmitter coordinates: 12°24′52.06″S 130°58′9.41″E

Links
- Public licence information: Profile
- Webcast: Webcast iHeartRadio Stream
- Website: www.mix1049.com.au

Mix 104.9 (call sign: 8MIX) is a radio station in Darwin, Northern Territory, Australia. It started broadcasting in 1997 – at the time, sister station Hot 100 was the only commercial radio station in Darwin – and has a relay in the remote town of Katherine (106.9 FM) as well as relays in smaller communities such as Pine Creek, Adelaide River and Bathurst Island.

In November 2021, Mix 104.9, along with other stations owned by Grant Broadcasters, were acquired by the Australian Radio Network. This deal allows Grant's stations, including Mix 104.9, to access ARN's iHeartRadio platform in regional areas. The deal was finalised on 4 January 2022. It was expected Mix 104.9 will integrate with ARN's Pure Gold Network, but will retain its current name according to the press release from ARN.
