= ABC Radio Darwin =

105.7 ABC Darwin

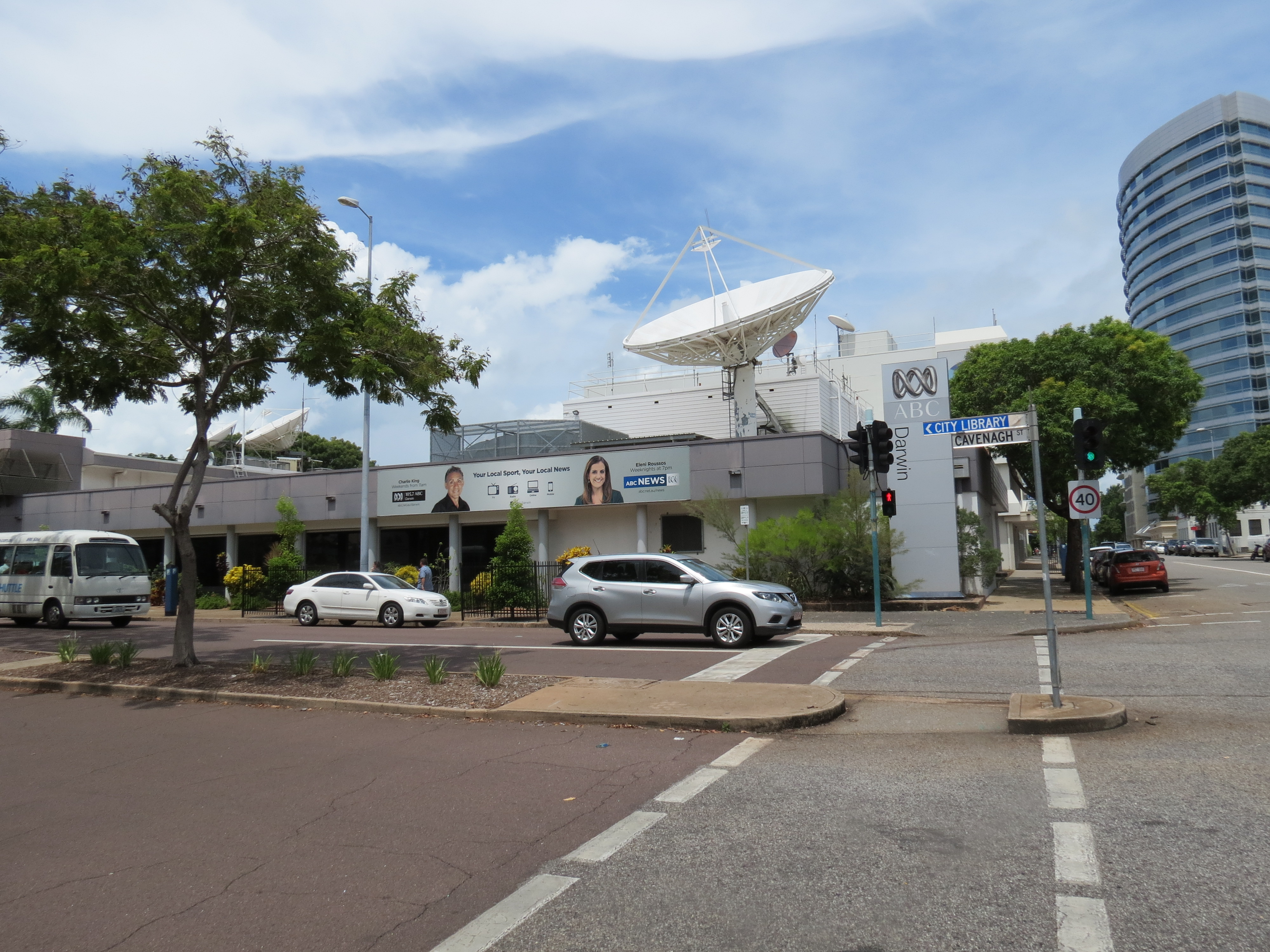
- Darwin, Northern Territory; Australia
- Broadcast area: Darwin and Tiwi Islands
- Frequency: 105.7MHz FM

Programming
- Language: English
- Format: Talk

Ownership
- Owner: Australian Broadcasting Corporation

History
- First air date: 1947
- Former call signs: 5DR (1947–1960); 8DR (1960–1989)
- Former frequencies: 1500 kHz AM (1947–1959), 650 kHz AM (1959-1978), 657 kHz AM (1978-1989)

Technical information
- Licensing authority: Australian Communications and Media Authority
- Transmitter coordinates: 12°24′52.06″S 130°58′9.41″E

Links
- Website: www.abc.net.au/darwin/

105.7 ABC Darwin (call sign: 8DDD) is an ABC radio station which is located in Darwin, Northern Territory. It is one of the stations in the ABC Local Radio network and broadcasts on 105.7MHz on the FM dial. It is an Australian Government sponsored station and is run through the Australian Broadcasting Corporation.

== History ==
In 1947, the ABC took over an old Army station, 5DR, and relaunched it as its first station in the Northern Territory. In the early days, its staffers lived in huts without air conditioning, and most programming was flown up on discs. Since there was only one newspaper in the area, 5DR frequently broadcast funeral arrangements because the Northern Territory's humid climate made it impossible to keep a body for any long period of time.

In 1960 all Northern Territory radio stations moved from the 5 prefix previously shared with South Australia to the 8 prefix, the station becoming 8DR.

The station came into its own in 1974, when Cyclone Tracy slammed into Darwin. Dick Muddimer, one of the station's reporters, was able to get to the studios of local television station NTD-8 and send a message to the ABC studios in Mount Isa asking them to notify Sydney that Darwin had been struck by a cyclone. Due to the great distance between Darwin and the rest of Australia and the fact the storm made landfall on Christmas Day, most of the rest of the nation didn't know about Tracy until mid-afternoon. It was the only station whose transmitter was not completely disabled by the storm, and for the next two days was the only link between Darwin and the outside world. Over the next few weeks, it was on the air for all but 34 hours.

8DDD ABC Darwin began broadcasting in 1989 on 105.7 MHz, replacing 8DR. The former 8DR frequency, 657 kHz, was re-allocated to launching ABC Radio National in Darwin.

8DDD was ABC Radio's ninth metropolitan station and was set up and first managed by Phil Cullen. Its broadcasting facilities are located in Cavenagh Street, in the Darwin City Centre. 8DDD is broadcast throughout the Darwin metropolitan areas and some rural country surrounding Darwin. The station brings Local, National and International news headlines throughout the hour. It also presents Sport and Weather.

ABC Northern Territory Outback Radio services was launched in 1985 as VL8K, VL8T and VL8A. The Katherine and Tennant Creek services broadcast the Darwin Local Radio programming, as well as Alice Springs service broadcasts Alice Springs Local Radio content. Programs are relayed on ABC Outback Radio services which was transmitted on shortwave until January 2017.

== 8DDD ABC Darwin transmitters ==
The 8DDD 105.7 MHz transmitter is located in the Darwin suburb of Berrimah.

== See also ==
- List of radio stations in Australia
