= Frank Hatherley =

Australian radio presenter

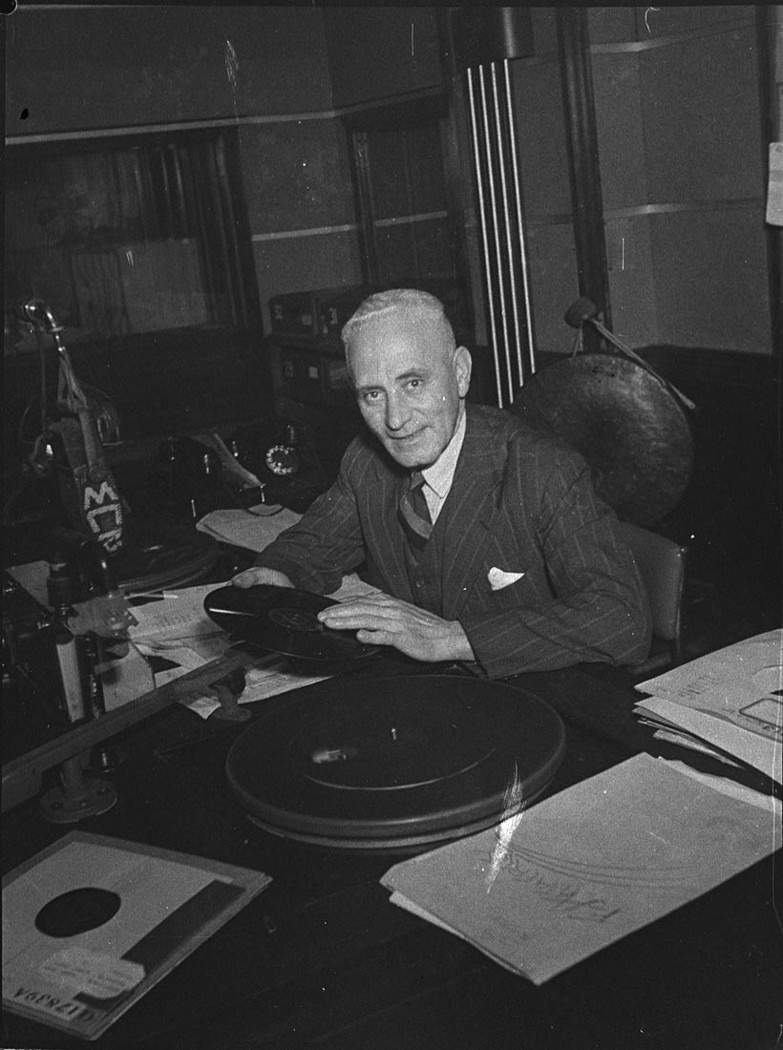
Broadcaster Frank Hatherley, also known as "Bobby Bluegum", May 1944

Frank Hatherley (25 June 1890 - 17 April 1956), also known as 'Bobby Bluegum' was an Australian radio personality, announcer and community singing leader. He was the first children's session presenter at the Australian Broadcasting Corporation.

== Early life ==
Born Frank Hatherleigh Matters, on 26 June 1890, in Semaphore, a coastal suburb of Adelaide, South Australia, he was the third of four children to Richard Matters, an ironmonger, and Emily Williams. His elder siblings were Rosa and Gladys. A younger brother followed 11 years later, Arnold Hatherleigh Matters, the Australian operatic baritone and producer.

He was educated at Adelaide's St. Peter's College, and told Radio Pictorial of Australia (1 May 1936) that he won a bursary from his state school to the private Pulteney School, and a later bursary to the Prince Alfred College.

== Early career ==
Hatherley's first job out of school was as a commercial traveller, selling wholesale clothing and furnishings in south Australia. His interest soon turned to acting, and when he was cast as the hero in a theatrical production of the 1861 book East Lynne, he began touring as a professional actor. During this time he elected to become known as Frank Hatherley, a contraction of his given middle name. By 1914, at 23, Hatherley was touring Australia as support actor and Assistant Stage Manager with Canadian stage actress Muriel Starr for J.C. Williamson's productions.

== Radio career ==
=== Radio 3LO Melbourne ===
Making his Stage Manager’s report to the J.C. Williamson's management in Melbourne in 1925, Frank had to report to the JCW-owned radio station 3LO. After a voice test, he was hired as an announcer and soon after replaced the ill conductor of the station’s weekly community singing session. He stayed with 3LO for the next five years [it became part of the Australian Broadcasting Commission in 1928] and his reputation grew.

‘Story readers’ for child listeners were an important part of early radio and all the 3LO announcers adopted child-friendly aliases. Hatherley’s alter ego was Bobby Bluegum, a name that was to stick with him for the rest of his life. From 5pm to 6.30pm he was on the air at 3LO Melbourne in the 'Children's Session' with birthday calls, ‘singable songs and simple stories’.

=== Radio 2FC National ===
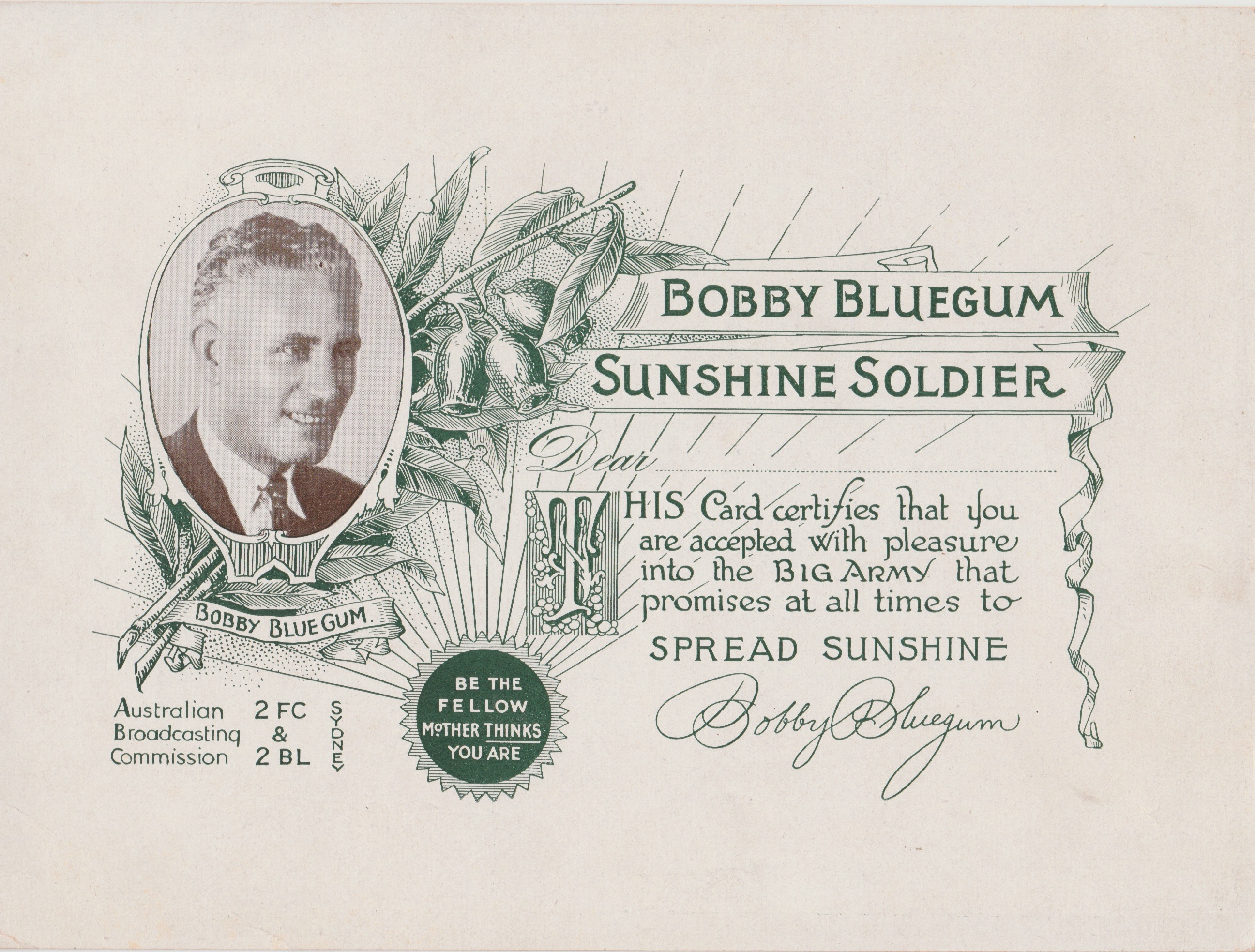
Bobby Bluegum Sunshine Soldier Certificate

In 1930, Hatherley was signed to the brand new ABC national broadcaster 2FC Sydney as ‘Announcer and Community Singing Conductor’. ABC history states: ‘At 8.00pm on 1 July 1932, the Prime Minister Joseph Lyons launched the ABC, the national broadcaster, and opening day programs on the wireless included the first Children's Session with Bobby Bluegum.’ His broadcast sessions moved from the old Opera House (later renamed the Tivoli Theatre) to the cavernous Sydney Town Hall, and from once to twice a week.

For 2FC, he created The Sunshine Soldiers, a radio club for children dedicated to bringing ‘sunshine’ to mums and dads, and to less fortunate children. Children received a certificate from Bobby Bluegum stating that ‘You are accepted with pleasure into the BIG ARMY that promises at all times to SPREAD SUNSHINE’. The club, forerunner to The Argonauts (formed 1940), was a huge success.

Hatherley left the national broadcaster in 1935.

=== Community Vaudeville ===
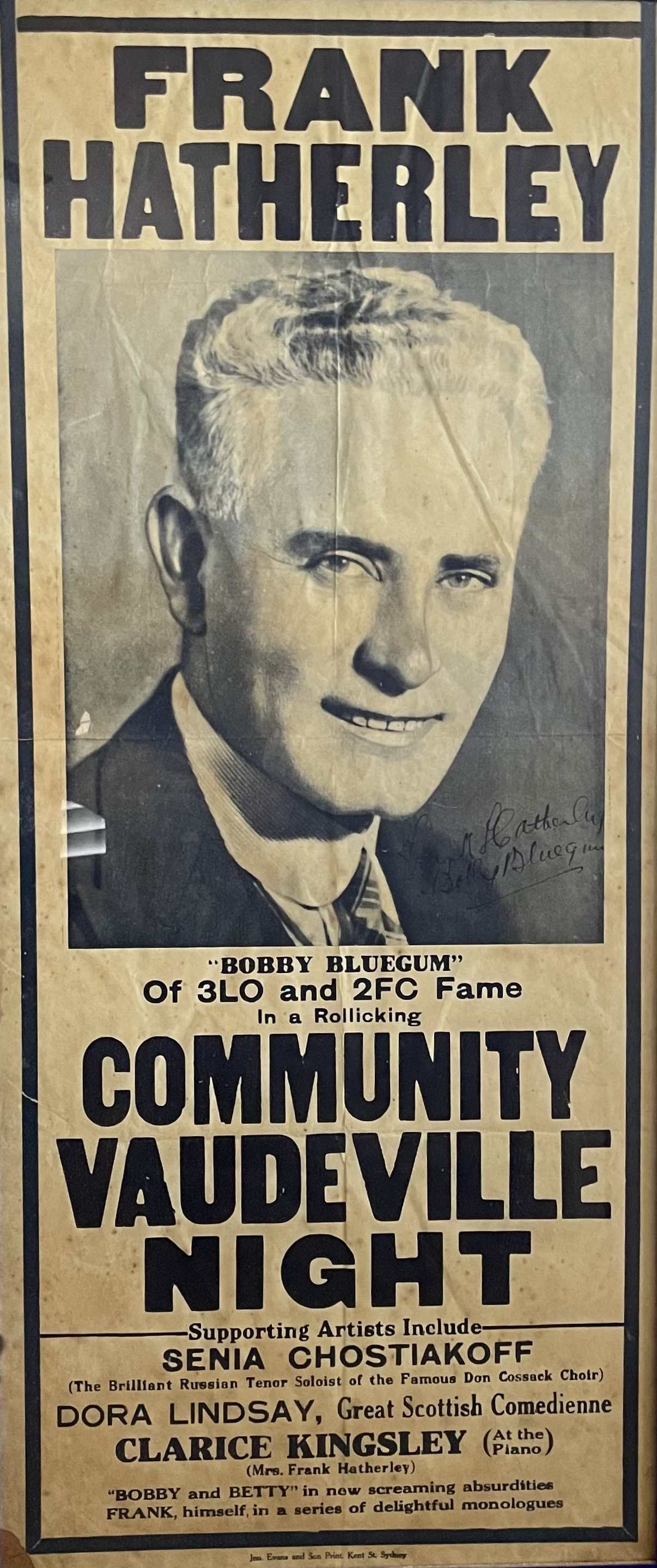
Community Vaudeville Night Poster

Frank and his wife Clarice, now Bobby and Betty Bluegum, toured NSW and Victoria with their ‘Community Vaudeville Night’, playing over 250 one-night stands in 1935.

=== Radio 2UW and 2KY Sydney ===
Frank returned to Sydney radio in 1936, first doing a stint with 2UW and then another with 2KY. Frank and Clarice featured on the front cover of Wireless Weekly in October 1936. The publication Teleradio of 28 May 1938 reported: ‘When a Sydney radio journal conducted a competition to discover the most popular radio announcer in Australia, Frank Hatherley walked away with it.’

=== Radio 4BH Brisbane ===
He moved to 4BH Brisbane in 1938 as ‘Host’ or ‘Chief Announcer’.

=== Return to 2UW Sydney ===
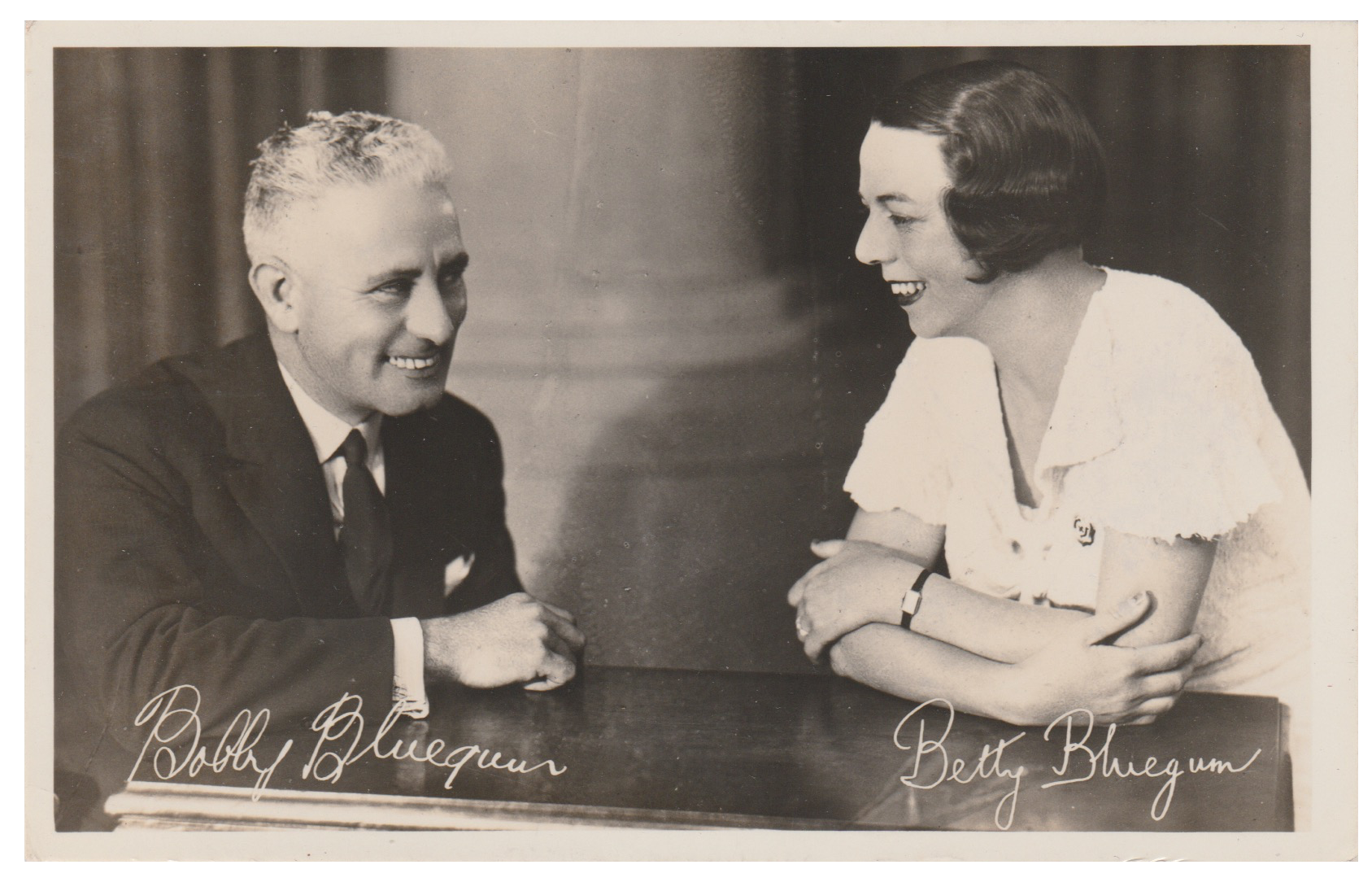
Bobby and Betty Bluegum

In 1942, Frank rejoined commercial station 2UW with whom he worked for the next 14 years, doing the afternoon announcing stint, writing and hosting the ‘Children’s Hour’ and conducting lunchtime community singing at the ‘2UW Theatrette’ in Market Street. For many years he also conducted Sydney's annual Carols by Candlelight concert in Hyde Park.

== Personal life ==
On 13 February 1912, he married Daisy Barton, a 23-year-old actress, in the Methodist Parsonage at Swan Hill, near Melbourne. They were divorced on 20 February 1930. Hatherley met 20-year-old pianist Clarice Kingsley (b 1904) in 1924. They married on 12 April 1930. Their first son, Robert Charles Hatherleigh Matters, was born on 19 August 1932. Their second son, also christened Frank Hatherleigh Matters, was born on 27 August 1941.

== Final years ==
Hatherley moved into daily rostered radio announcing on 2UW. He continued working in community singing. He died on 17 April 1956 at the age of 66.
