= ABC Alice Springs =

- Australia
- Broadcast area: Alice Springs, Northern Territory, Australia
- Frequency: 783 kHz AM

Programming
- Format: Talk

Ownership
- Owner: Australian Broadcasting Corporation

History
- First air date: 30 November 1948
- Former frequencies: 1530 kHz AM (1948–1978), 1377 kHz AM (1978–1983)

Technical information
- Transmitter coordinates: 23.7004°S 133.8809°E

Links
- Website: abc.net.au/alicesprings

ABC Alice Springs (call sign: 8AL) is the ABC Local Radio station in Alice Springs, Northern Territory. It broadcasts on 783 kHz on the AM band, with low-powered relay stations across the Northern Territory Outback.

The station was officially opened as 5AL on 30 November 1948 as a member of the ABC Regional Network relaying programmes out of Adelaide, and transmitting on a frequency of 1530 kHz. The call sign was changed to 8AL in 1960.

Employment of local journalists began around 1970.

In 1978, the transmitting frequency changed from 1530 kHz to 1377 kHz. By the 1982–83 financial year, the station's frequency changed again, to 783 kHz.

The station originates four local programs during the week: Breakfast with Stewart Brash, Mornings with Rick Hind, Drive with Andrew Murdoch and Saturday Breakfast with Rohan Barwick. At all other times, it is a relay of ABC Radio Darwin.

== See also ==
- List of radio stations in Australia
