= Francis McLean (engineer) =

British television and radio engineer (1904–1998)

Sir Francis Charles McLean CBE (6 November 1904 – 19 December 1998) was a British electronics engineer. He was chief engineer of the Psychological Warfare Division of the Supreme Headquarters, Allied Expeditionary Force (PWD Shaef) in World War II, and Director of Engineering at the BBC from 1963 to 1968.

McLean was born in Ladywood, Birmingham, the eldest son of Michael and Alice McLean. He graduated from the University of Birmingham.

In 1966, he delivered a Faraday Lecture on the subject of colour television, in whose development he was instrumental. He was made a Knight Bachelor in 1967 and retired from the BBC in 1968. He chaired the Royal Commission on FM Broadcasting in Australia.

He appeared as a castaway on the BBC Radio programme Desert Island Discs on 12 August 1968.

A dormitory block at the BBC training centre at Wood Norton, Worcestershire, was named in his honour.

He died in West Berkshire.
