= ABC Katherine =

Coordinates: 14°28′00″S 132°15′59″E

Australia
- Broadcast area: Katherine, Northern Territory
- Frequency: 106.1 mHz FM

Programming
- Format: Talk

Ownership
- Owner: Australian Broadcasting Corporation

Links
- Website: https://www.abc.net.au/katherine/

ABC Katherine is an ABC Local Radio station based in and broadcasting to Katherine and Pine Creek in the Northern Territory. It broadcasts on 106.1 MHz on the FM band. The station's local staff consists of a single reporter, and its only local program is The Katherine Rural Report. At all other times the station is a relay of ABC Radio Darwin.

== See also ==
- List of radio stations in Australia
