= ABC NewsRadio =

Australian Broadcasting Corporation radio service

- Australia
- Frequencies: AM/FM: Various; DVB-T: Ch. 204; Foxtel: TV 875, Radio 43; DAB+; online

Programming
- Language: English
- Format: All-news radio
- Network: ABC Radio

Ownership
- Owner: Australian Broadcasting Corporation

History
- First air date: 15 August 1994; 32 years ago
- Former names: ABC News on Radio (2017)

Technical information
- Licensing authority: Australian Communications and Media Authority

Links
- Webcast: Live stream
- Website: abc.net.au/listen/news

ABC NewsRadio is a 24-hour news radio service broadcast by the Australian public broadcaster, the Australian Broadcasting Corporation (ABC). ABC NewsRadio is available via a number of platforms around Australia, including AM/FM radio, online via web or the ABC Listen app, DAB+ radio, free-to-air digital TV, VAST satellite and some pay-TV platforms.

The origins of the radio station lie in the statutory obligation of the ABC to live-broadcast all Australian Parliamentary sessions, which were originally (from 1946) broadcast on its national radio network. In 1988, the Parliamentary Broadcasting Network (PBN) was established as a dedicated parliamentary radio station; in August 1994 this station's frequencies were used to provide news updates when Parliament was not in session, and Parliamentary and News Network (PNN), the forerunner of ABC NewsRadio, was born.

== History ==
=== Background ===
Legislation passed in 1946 (the Parliamentary Proceedings Broadcasting Act 1946 (Note: "4. Broadcasting of parliamentary proceedings. (1) Notwithstanding anything contained in the Australian Broadcasting Corporation Act 1983, the Australian Broadcasting Corporation shall broadcast the proceedings of the Senate, the House of Representatives or a joint sitting from: (a) a medium‑wave national broadcasting station in the capital city in each State and in the city of Newcastle in the State of New South Wales; and (b) such other national broadcasting stations (including shortwave national broadcasting stations) as are prescribed; upon such days and during such periods as the Committee determines.")) requiring the ABC to broadcast Parliament live when in session. The legislation does not determine the name of the network. Parliamentary broadcasting was commenced under Ben Chifley's government on 10 July 1946, of Question Time. The broadcasts were put onto the single nationally broadcast radio network; however, the Commission frequently commented on the disruption this caused to its programming in its annual reports.

=== 1988: PBN ===
In August 1988, the Parliamentary Broadcast Network (PBN) was established under the National Metropolitan Radio Plan, as a dedicated network to carry the ABC's mandatory Parliamentary broadcasts on AM transmitters in each state capital as well as Newcastle and Canberra.

=== 1994: PNN ===
In May 1994 the Interim Report of the Inquiry into the Radio and Television Broadcasting of Parliamentary Proceedings was published, supporting the ABC's proposal to provide news on the PBN. The expanded service would be called the Parliamentary and News Network (PNN).

On 15 August 1994 PNN was launched to provide a continuous news network broadcast on the same frequencies used by the PBN, when Parliament was not sitting, with the service expanding the service to Darwin, Northern Territory in March 1997 to complete its coverage to all capital cities. in the 1996–7 financial year, "ABC NewsRadio on the Parliamentary and News Network" showed the strongest growth of any ABC network, increasing its weekly reach to 397,000 listeners nationally, up 44.9%. (The news service was known for some time as ABC NewsRadio on the Parliamentary and News Network, with the last six words from in parentheses for a few years before being dropped completely in 2010.)

Despite the use of the network by ABC NewsRadio, the PNN exists independent of it. The PNN falls under the Parliamentary Proceedings Broadcasting Act 1946. Parliamentary proceedings must be broadcast on the network defined by the Act.

=== 21st century: other platforms ===
From September 2001, the 24-hour rolling news format began with live audio streaming on the Internet.

ABC NewsRadio began to continue its news programming online while its radio network broadcast parliament in 2002. The service also expanded into the Gold Coast – the first new coverage area for the network in five years.

From 2009, the service was extended to digital radio, first in the capital cities and then rolled out to regional Australia. and subscription TV services. FM transmission was expanded greatly during a 2006-2009 program. It planned to increase the AM/FM coverage from 78% of the population to 95%. In 2009, separate standard and parliamentary feeds were launched on digital terrestrial (DAB+) radio in the state capitals.

In November 2016, the ABC announced that ABC NewsRadio and ABC News 24 would be rebranded as simply ABC News on 10 April 2017, coinciding with a corporate rebrand. The two would be distinguished by context or by descriptors, such as "the ABC News channel" for TV and "ABC News on radio" for radio. Social media accounts were also merged. The radio brand was reverted to ABC NewsRadio in 2018.

== Content and format ==
ABC NewsRadio broadcasts every session live from the House of Representatives and the Senate, and a delayed broadcast of parliamentary question time in the evening, on the AM/FM radio network, and is not streamed online or broadcast on digital radio.

ABC NewsRadio has a 24-hour news format, drawing from all of the ABC News resources, and broadcasts live across Australia, with no delayed broadcasting to accommodate Australian time zones. Schedules may change if there is breaking news. Live parliamentary coverage takes precedence over the station's regular schedule, but while this coverage takes place (whenever Parliament is in session), regular news programming continues online, via digital radio (DAB+) in Adelaide, Brisbane, Canberra, Darwin, Hobart, Melbourne, Perth and Sydney. and on the ABC Listen app.

The station often relays programming from the BBC World Service.

ABC News also broadcasts Australian Football League and National Rugby League matches on weekends in some states.

As of 2017, there were around 700 transmitters across Australia.
