= 2XX FM =

Radio station in Canberra, Australia

1XXR
- Canberra, Australian Capital Territory; Australia
- Broadcast area: Canberra RA1 ()
- Frequency: FM: 98.3 MHz
- Branding: 2XX

Programming
- Language: mostly English
- Format: community radio

Ownership
- Owner: Community Radio 2XX, Inc.

History
- First air date: 2 July 1976
- Former call signs: 2XX (1976–2000)
- Former frequencies: 1010 kHz (1976–1978); 1008 kHz (1978–2000)

Technical information
- ERP: 32787 watts
- HAAT: 32 m
- Transmitter coordinates: 35°16′32″S 149°5′52″E

Links
- Website: Official website

2XX FM (call sign: 1XXR) is a community radio station, broadcasting on the FM band in Canberra, Australia.

2XX FM is one of Australia's longest running community broadcasters. It took over the operation of the former Australian National University student radio station in July 1976, broadcasting as 2XX on 1010 kHz AM from two studios at the Drill Hall Gallery in Acton. It was originally scheduled to launch in February 1976, but was delayed indefinitely until July 1976 because of a technical problem. It moved to 1008 kHz AM in 1978. A third studio, completed in 1985, was fitted out as a multitrack recording studio for local bands to make independent recordings and give live-to-air performances.

In 2000 the station moved into converted studios at the Griffin Centre in Civic and changed the broadcast frequency to 98.3 MHz FM. The callsign was changed to 1XXR, but the station still identifies as "2XX" to this day.

In 2005 the station moved into purpose-built premises in the New Griffin Centre in Civic. The premises include office space and three studios. Two are broadcasting studios, one primary and one for back-up. The latter is used, together with the third studio, for editing and pre-recording.

2XX FM hosts specialty music, talk, opinion and ethnic programmes run by well over a hundred individuals and community organisations. The core focus is on the local community through Canberran current affairs and community service programs, local music, and a range of multicultural programs in first languages as well as some in English. It also takes some programming from the Community Broadcasting Association of Australia Digital Delivery Network.

Prominent personalities that hosted shows on 2XX include Peter Garrett, Sue Maslin, Jonathan Green and Helen Razer.
