= FM broadcasting in Australia =

History of FM radio in Australia

FM broadcasting started in Australian capital cities in 1947 on an "experimental" basis, using a (monaural) ABC national network feed, consisting largely of classical music and Parliament, as a programme source. FM receivers were expensive and the audience consisted largely of hi-fi enthusiasts. The transmitters (operated by the PMG's Dept) were shut down in 1961, as much of the standard FM band (98–108 MHz) was reserved for TV channel 5 (102.25 video carrier).

== Early attempts at introduction ==
In April 1948 the Labor government of Ben Chifley indicated that the introduction of FM broadcasts would occur on a nationalised basis with no commercial stations. After the passage of the Broadcasting Act which gave the Federal Government full control of FM in Australia, it was suggested in January 1949 that the Chifley government would "soft pedal" the development of FM radio.

In their annual report released on 3 January 1956, the Australian Broadcasting Control Board proposed a public inquiry into FM broadcasting once the government passed legislation allowing the use of FM by commercial radio.

The Australian Broadcasting Control Board announced an inquiry, to be held on 15 March to 19 March, into FM broadcasting on 21 January 1971. At the enquiry on 2 March 1971, the chairman of the Australian Broadcasting Corporation, Robert Madgwick called for the introduction of FM broadcasting.

== Royal Commission ==
On 25 September 1973, following the recommendation of the Broadcasting Control Board to use UHF and the interim report of the Senate Standing Committee on Education, Science and the Arts, which recommended using VHF after noting that there were already about 1 million FM radios with VHF support in Australia, Prime Minister Gough Whitlam announced an independent inquiry into how FM broadcasting could work. In November 1973 it was announced that Francis McLean would be chairman and Charles Renwick from the University of Newcastle would be commissioner.

In March 1974 the report was released which said that FM broadcasting could begin in as little as 2 1/2 years by using the VHF rather than the UHF bands as it would be impractical and uneconomic.

== Implementation ==
The first FM station to start broadcasting in Australia was 2MBS Sydney on 15 December 1974. Other stations launched in 1975, including 3MBS Melbourne on 1 July and 4ZZ (now 4ZZZ) Brisbane on 8 December. More public broadcasting (now community radio) stations followed in the following years.

The government-run ABC-FM, (now ABC Classic), launched on January 24 1976, in Sydney, Canberra, Melbourne and Adelaide, later to expand to other capital cities and regional areas.

The first commercial FM station was EON-FM (3EON-FM) Melbourne (now 3MMM or Triple M), on 11 July 1980. By the end of 1980, Sydney and Melbourne had two commercial FM stations, while Brisbane, Adelaide and Perth had one each.

During the 1980s, much of the band was still occupied by a few television transmitters, but by the 1990s these had been reallocated to other bands, and are now closed, along with all other analog broadcast TV services, following the advent of digital television. As AM/FM portable and car radios displaced AM-only receivers, conversion to FM-stereo became progressively more attractive to broadcasters, and the swing to FM with its superior sound quality and immunity from interference, was under way. Many AM stations transferred to FM, with its lower costs, and many new services were opened. Today, as elsewhere in the developed world, most Australian broadcasting is on FM - although AM talk stations are still very popular and high-power AM transmitters, both national and commercial, are valued by travellers and country listeners, and in emergency situations.

== Australian analog TV allocations ==
The FM band was potentially susceptible to interference from these TV stations (obsolete; of historic interest only).

RF range	RF band	TV channel	Australia		
RF range	RF band	TV channel	QAM centre MHz	Vision carrier MHz	FM mono audio sub-carrier MHz
VHF	Band II	3		86.25	91.75
VHF	Band II	4		95.25	100.75
VHF	Band II	5		102.25	107.75
VHF	Band II	5A	140.5	138.25	143.75

== Significant FM networks ==
- ABC Radio
  - ABC Classic
  - Triple J
- ARN
  - Gold
  - KIIS Network
- CAAMA
- Nova Entertainment
  - Nova
  - Smoothfm
- SBS Radio
- Southern Cross Austereo
  - Hit Network
  - Triple M
