= 105.1 FM =

FM radio frequency

The following radio stations broadcast on FM frequency 105.1 MHz:

== Argentina ==
- Centauro in La Tigra, Chaco
- Centro in Basavilbaso, Entre Ríos
- Caroya in Colonia Caroya, Córdoba
- Córdoba in Córdoba
- Escobar in Belén de Escobar, Buenos Aires
- La 100 Rosario in Rosario, Santa Fe
- La 105 Libertad in Neuquén
- La Única in Puerto Madryn, Chubut
- 105.1 in 25 de Mayo, Buenos Aires
- de la Montaña in San Martín de los Andes, Neuquén
- Impacto in Pozo del Molle, Córdoba
- La 105 in Carlos Casares, Buenos Aires
- Municipal in Ulapes, La Rioja
- Parroquial in Buenos Aires
- Radio María in General Pico, La Pampa
- Radio Sur in Berisso, Buenos Aires
- Ser Otro Ser in San Martín, Buenos Aires
- Tiempo in Cutral Có, Neuquén
- San Cayetano in Tigre, Buenos Aires

== Australia ==
- Triple M Melbourne
- Life FM in Bendigo
- 5TRX in Port Pirie
- ABC Classic in Renmark
- 2PB in Wagga Wagga
- Radio National in Cairns
- Rhema FM in Bundaberg

== Belarus ==
- Autoradio in Minsk.

== Canada (Channel 286) ==
- CBDE-FM in Brochet, Manitoba
- CBDG-FM in Shamattawa, Manitoba
- CBDH-FM in Uranium City, Saskatchewan
- CBDL-FM in Destruction Bay, Yukon
- CBGA-9-FM in Cloridorme, Quebec
- CBI-FM in Sydney, Nova Scotia
- CBIG-FM in Arviat, Nunavut
- CBIH-FM in Cape Dorset, Nunavut
- CBII-FM in Igloolik, Nunavut
- CBIJ-FM in Pangnirtung, Nunavut
- CBIK-FM in Pond Inlet, Nunavut
- CBIL-FM in Resolute, Nunavut
- CBIN-FM in Cambridge Bay, Nunavut
- CBIO-FM in Kugluktuk, Nunavut
- CBIQ-FM in Taloyoak, Nunavut
- CBKC-FM in Ile-a-la-Crosse, Saskatchewan
- CBKN-FM in Island Falls, Saskatchewan
- CBMP-FM in Chisasibi, Quebec
- CBMQ-FM in Waskaganish, Quebec
- CBMR-FM in Fermont, Quebec
- CBMW-FM in Nouveau-Comptoir, Quebec
- CBND-FM in Postville, Newfoundland and Labrador
- CBNP-FM in Port Hope Simpson, Newfoundland and Labrador
- CBOK-FM in Kapuskasing, Ontario
- CBQB-FM in Rae/Edzo, Northwest Territories
- CBQD-FM in Fort Resolution, Northwest Territories
- CBQE-FM in Fort Good Hope, Northwest Territories
- CBQK-FM in Faro, Yukon
- CBQO-FM in Deline, Northwest Territories
- CBQP-FM in Pickle Lake, Ontario
- CBQR-FM in Rankin Inlet, Nunavut
- CBRY-FM in Alert Bay, British Columbia
- CBUF-FM-5 in Kitimat, British Columbia
- CBU-FM-2 in Metchosin/Sooke, British Columbia
- CBVW-FM in Waswanipi, Quebec
- CBWD-FM in Waasagomach, Manitoba
- CFAI-FM-1 in Grand-Sault, New Brunswick
- CFIC-FM in Restigouche/Listuguj, Quebec
- CFMD-FM in Muskrat Dam, Ontario
- CFRL-FM in Rigolet, Newfoundland and Labrador
- CHOQ-FM in Toronto, Ontario
- CITA-FM in Moncton, New Brunswick
- CJED-FM in Niagara Falls, Ontario
- CJVR-FM in Melfort, Saskatchewan
- CKDG-FM in Montreal, Quebec
- CKHI-FM in Holman Island, Northwest Territories
- CKHY-FM in Halifax, Nova Scotia
- CKQM-FM in Peterborough, Ontario
- CKRY-FM in Calgary, Alberta
- VF2210 in Kemano, British Columbia
- VF2278 in Snowdrift/Lutselk, Northwest Territories
- VF2305 in McBride, British Columbia

== China ==
- CNR Business Radio in Anshan
- CNR Music Radio in Shijiazhuang
- CNR The Voice of China in Xianyang

== Costa Rica ==
- Omega Estereo in San Jose, Costa Rica

== Indonesia ==
- RRI Batam Pro-1 in Batam and Singapore
- Prambors in Makassar, Indonesia
- I-Radio in Bandung, Indonesia

== Israel ==
- Kan Tarbut in Jerusalem and Safed

== Malaysia ==
- Asyik FM in Cameron Highlands, Pahang
- Molek FM in Kota Bharu, Kelantan

== Mexico ==
- XHATM-FM in Morelia, Michoacán
- XHCJZ-FM in Ciudad Jiménez, Chihuahua
- XHCPAK-FM in Campeche, Campeche
- XHCPAZ-FM in Tampico, Tamaulipas
- XHERJ-FM in Mazatlán, Sinaloa
- XHEZUM-FM in Chilpancingo, Guerrero
- XHIM-FM in Ciudad Juárez, Chihuahua
- XHJF-FM in Tierra Blanca, Veracruz
- XHLEO-FM in León, Guanajuato
- XHMBM-FM in Guadalajara, Jalisco
- XHMMO-FM in Hermosillo, Sonora
- XHNAY-FM in Bucerias, Nayarit
- XHNI-FM in Nogales, Sonora
- XHNUC-FM in Cancún, Quintana Roo
- XHOLA-FM in Puebla, Puebla
- XHRCG-FM in Ciudad Acuña, Coahuila
- XHTNC-FM in Tancítaro, Michoacán
- XHYD-FM in Francisco I. Madero, Coahuila
- XHYJ-FM in Nueva Rosita, Coahuila
- XHZ-FM in Mérida, Yucatán

== Philippines ==
- DWBM-FM in Mega Manila
- DZBM in Baguio
- DYUR in Cebu City
- DXYS in Davao City
- DXLR in Lebak, Sultan Kudarat
- Juander Radyo in Zamboanga City

== United Kingdom ==
- Heart West in East Cornwall
- Mearns FM in Portlethen
- Radio Essex in Southend-on-Sea

== United States (Channel 286) ==
- KAKT in Phoenix, Oregon
- KAMT in Channing, Texas
- KAOC in Cavalier, North Dakota
- KARL in Tracy, Minnesota
- KAVM in Cold Bay, Alaska
- KBLP in Lindsay, Oklahoma
- KCFL-LP in Aberdeen, Washington
- KCJK in Garden City, Missouri
- KCRV-FM in Caruthersville, Missouri
- KCYZ in Ames, Iowa
- KEAN in Abilene, Texas
- KEVK-FM in Sanderson, Texas
- KFCB-LP in Douglas, Wyoming
- KFLX in Kachina Village, Arizona
- KFTE in Abbeville, Louisiana
- KGUM in Dededo, Guam
- KHOV-FM in Wickenburg, Arizona
- KIDI in Lompoc, California
- KINE in Honolulu, Hawaii
- KJOT in Boise, Idaho
- KJXN in South Park, Wyoming
- KKBZ in Auberry, California
- KKCB in Duluth, Minnesota
- KKGO in Los Angeles, California
- KKRG-FM in Santa Fe, New Mexico
- KLXB in Bermuda Dunes, California
- KMAT in Seadrift, Texas
- KMEC-LP in Ukiah, California
- KMIL in Cameron, Texas
- KMJX in Conway, Arkansas
- KNCI in Sacramento, California
- KOCN in Pacific Grove, California
- KOSB in Perry, Oklahoma
- KOSP in Willard, Missouri
- KPFN-LP in Laytonville, California
- KPGN-LP in Pierre, South Dakota
- KPLD in St. George and Cedar City, Utah
- KQRT in Las Vegas, Nevada
- KQWB-FM in Breckenridge, Minnesota
- KRFH-LP in Arcata, California
- KRSK in Molalla, Oregon
- KTKU in Juneau, Alaska
- KTMC-FM in Mcalester, Oklahoma
- KTTY in New Boston, Texas
- KTUG in Hudson, Wyoming
- KUAV-LP in Winterhaven, California
- KUDD in American Fork, Utah
- KVTY in Lewiston, Idaho
- KWMW in Maljamar, New Mexico
- KWOL in Whitefish, Montana
- KXGB-LP in Great Bend, Kansas
- KXIQ-LP in Brownsville, Texas
- KXKL in Denver, Colorado
- KXMX in Muldrow, Oklahoma
- KYKS in Lufkin, Texas
- KYSX in Billings, Montana
- KZKR in Jonesville, Louisiana
- KZPL in Encinal, Texas
- KZQD in Liberal, Kansas
- KZYS-LP in St. Cloud, Minnesota
- WALJ in Northport, Alabama
- WAMQ in Great Barrington, Massachusetts
- WASJ in Panama City Beach, Florida
- WAVA in Arlington, Virginia
- WBKZ in Havelock, North Carolina
- WBNH-LP in Bedford, New Hampshire
- WCIS-FM in Deruyter, New York
- WCLC in Jamestown, Tennessee
- WCYC-LP in London, Ohio
- WDCG in Durham, North Carolina
- WEJT in Shelbyville, Illinois
- WFOZ-LP in Winston-Salem, North Carolina
- WGEM-FM in Quincy, Illinois
- WGFG in Branchville, South Carolina
- WGFM in Cheboygan, Michigan
- WGHL in Shepherdsville, Kentucky
- WGVX in Lakeville, Minnesota
- WHCC in Ellettsville, Indiana
- WHQT in Coral Gables, Florida
- WHTR-LP in Rosemark, Tennessee
- WILQ in Williamsport, Pennsylvania
- WIOC in Ponce, Puerto Rico
- WIOV in Ephrata, Pennsylvania
- WJDX-FM in Kosciusko, Mississippi
- WFSH-FM in Sheffield, Pennsylvania
- WJZM in Waverly, Tennessee
- WKLC in Saint Albans, West Virginia
- WKOL in Plattsburgh, New York
- WKUB in Blackshear, Georgia
- WLVG in Clermont, Georgia
- WMGC in Detroit, Michigan
- WMHX in Waunakee, Wisconsin
- WMNM-LP in Mount Morris, Wisconsin
- WMUG-LP in Indiana, Pennsylvania
- WOJO in Evanston, Illinois
- WOMX in Orlando, Florida
- WOXF in Oxford, Mississippi
- WPDT in Johnsonville, South Carolina
- WPFL in Century, Florida
- WQHK in Decatur, Indiana
- WQNS in Woodfin, North Carolina
- WQSB in Albertville, Alabama
- WQXK in Salem, Ohio
- WRFS in Rockford, Alabama
- WRNZ in Lancaster, Kentucky
- WSBW in Ephraim, Wisconsin
- WTAO-FM in Murphysboro, Illinois
- WTOS in Skowhegan, Maine
- WTUK in Harlan, Kentucky
- WUBE in Cincinnati, Ohio
- WUIE in Lakesite, Tennessee
- WWLI in Providence, Rhode Island
- WWPR in New York, New York
- WWRE in Bridgewater, Virginia
- WWZT-LP in Tampa, Florida
- WXNV-LP in Loganville, Georgia
