= WBNH =

WBNH may refer to:

- WBNH (FM), a radio station (88.5 FM) licensed to serve Pekin, Illinois, United States
- WBNH-LP, a low-power radio station (105.1 FM) licensed to serve Bedford, New Hampshire, United States
