= Gosford =

City in New South Wales, Australia

- City
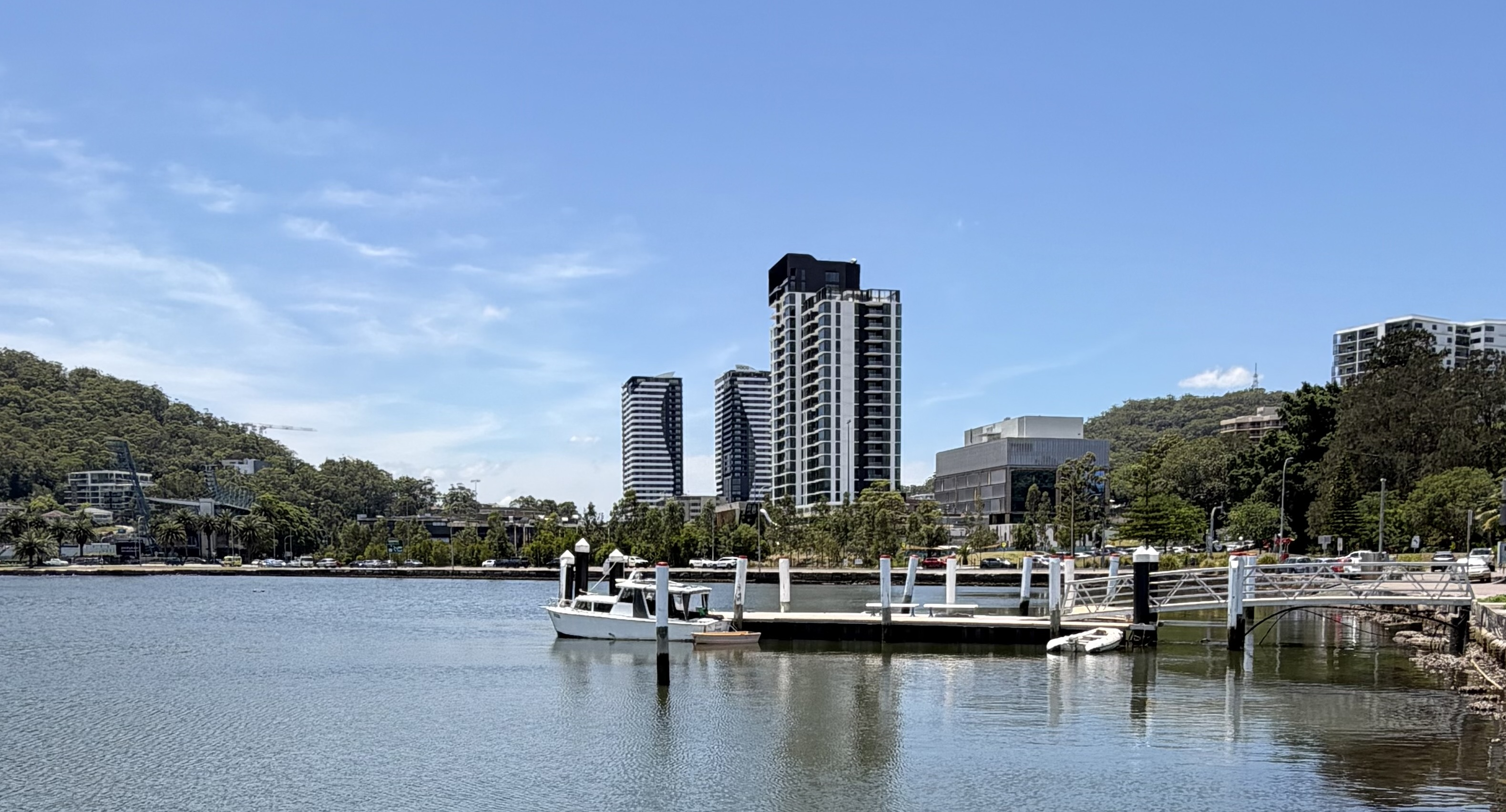
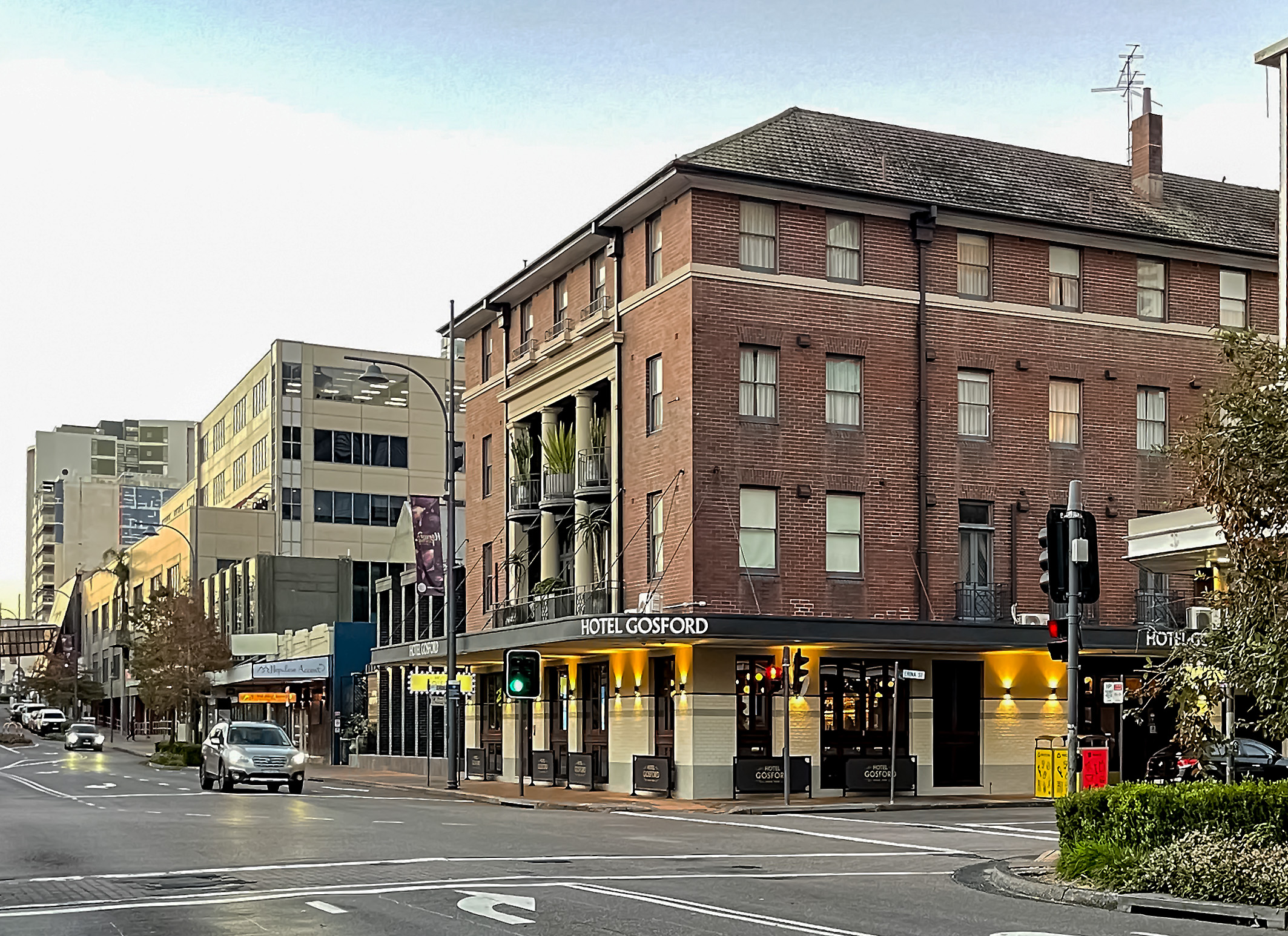
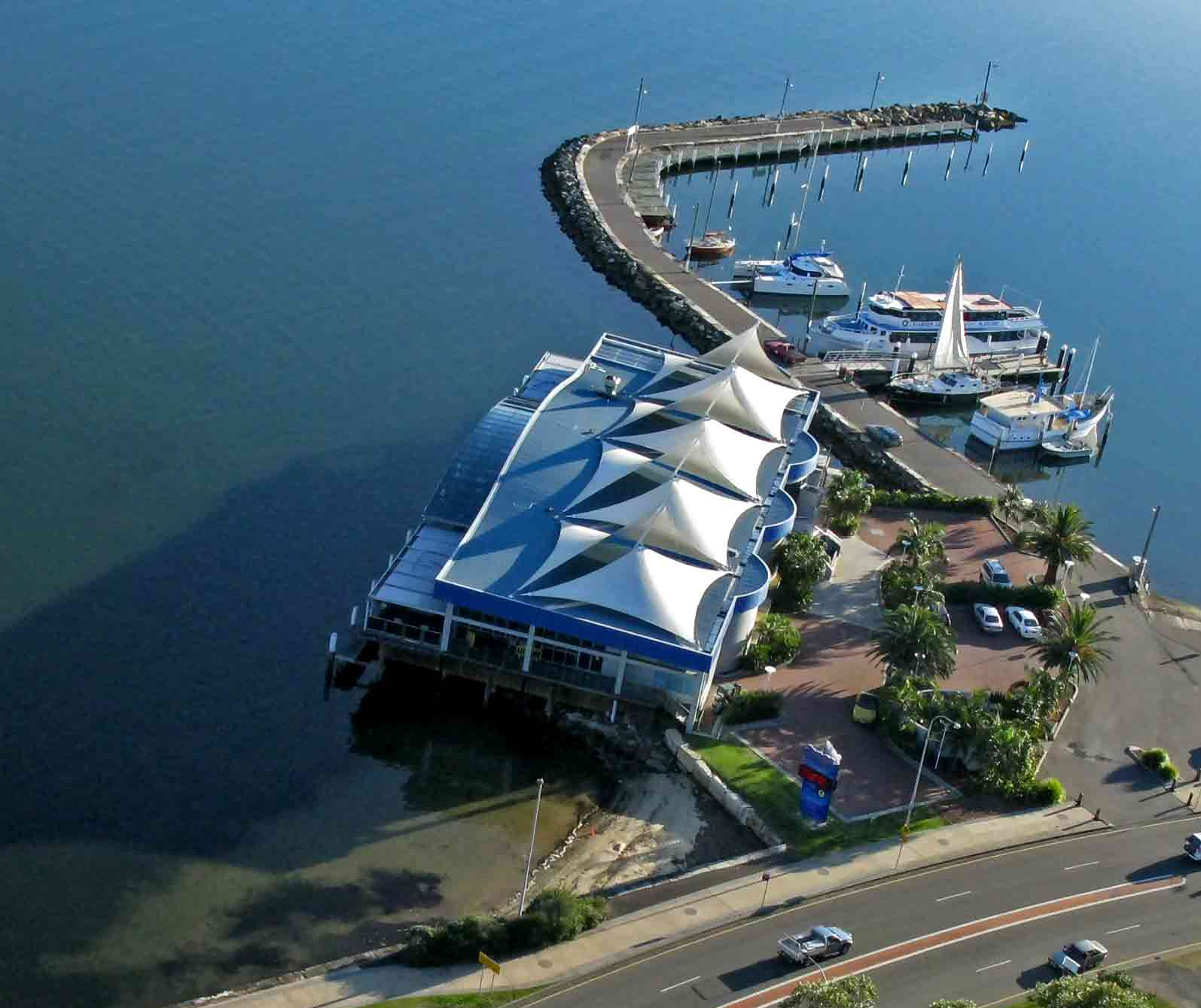
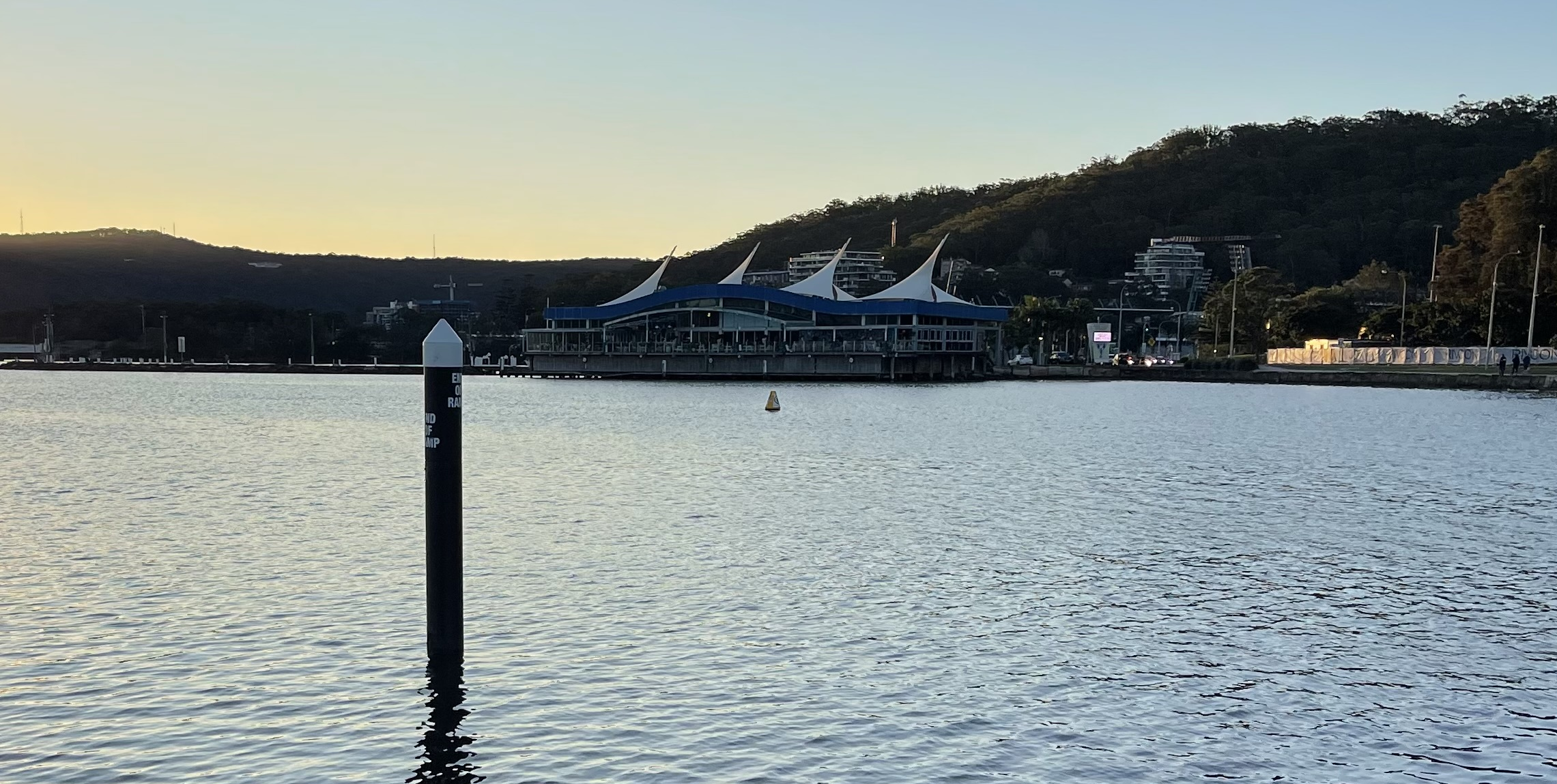
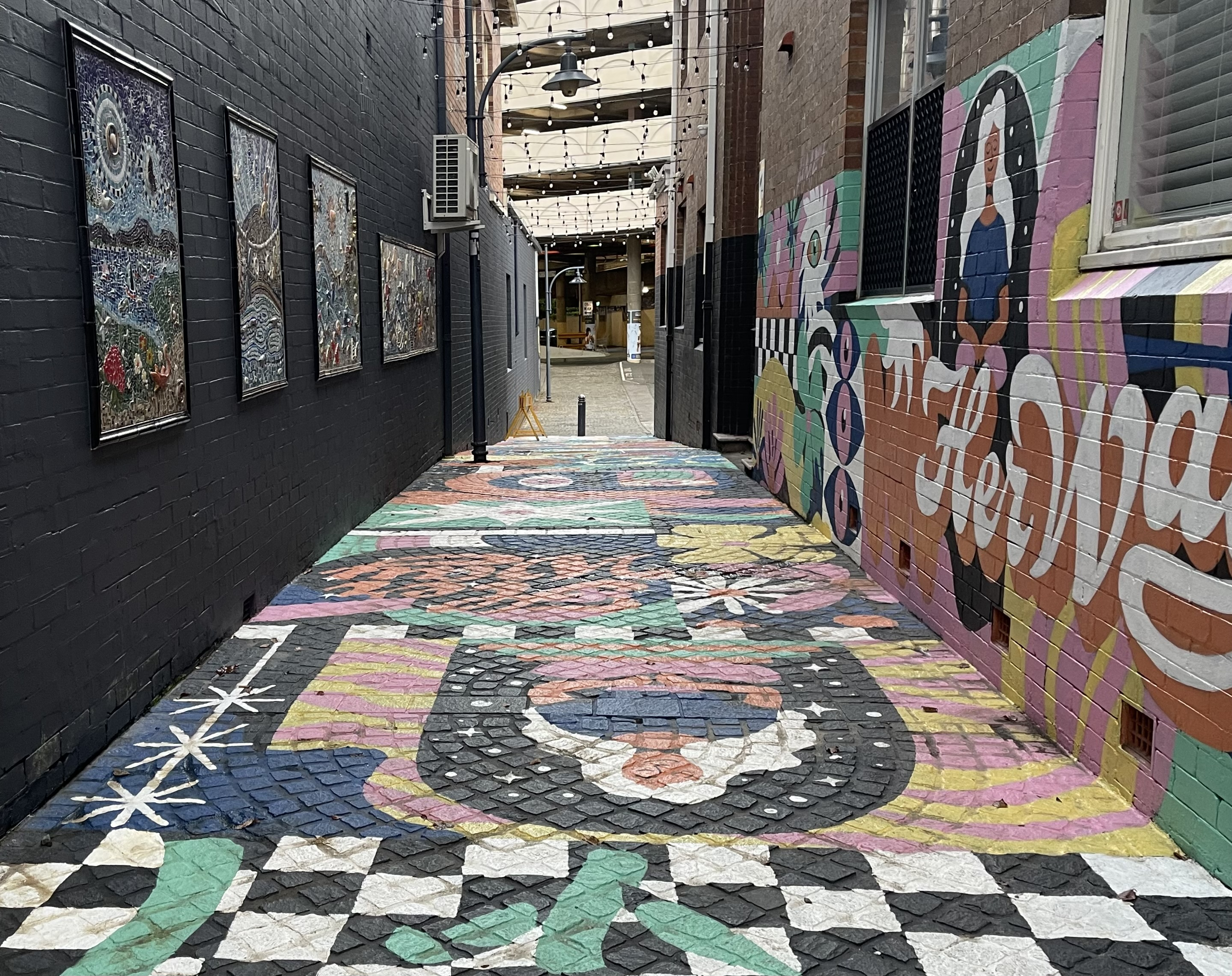
- Gosford City Centre Hotel Gosford Drifters Wharf Gosford Waterfront Mann Street Art Laneway

- Coordinates: 33°25′S 151°20′E
- Country: Australia
- State: New South Wales
- Region: Central Coast
- City: Central Coast
- LGA: Central Coast Council
- Location: 77 km (48 mi) NNE of Sydney; 839 km (521 mi) SSW of Brisbane; 86 km (53 mi) SW of Newcastle; 21 km (13 mi) SW of Wyong; 22 km (14 mi) SSW of The Entrance

Government
  - State electorates: Gosford; Terrigal
  - Federal division: Robertson
- Elevation: 20 m (66 ft)

Population
  - Total: 178,427 (2021 census)
- Time zone: UTC+10 (AEST)
  - Summer (DST): UTC+11 (AEST)
- Postcode: 2250
- County: Northumberland
- Mean max temp: 23.3 °C (73.9 °F)
- Mean min temp: 11.4 °C (52.5 °F)
- Annual rainfall: 1,333.0 mm (52.48 in)
Localities around Gosford
Narara	North Gosford	Wyoming
West Gosford	Gosford	East Gosford
Point Clare	Brisbane Water	Brisbane Water

Gosford is a waterfront city at the northern end of Brisbane Water on the Central Coast in the state of New South Wales, Australia. The Gosford Waterfront is known for its boating and scenic views on the shores of Brisbane Water. Gosford is the main commercial hub and gateway of the Central Coast. It is situated approximately 77 km (48 mi) north of Sydney and 86 km (53 mi) south of Newcastle. Gosford is located in the local government area of the Central Coast Council.

Gosford, locally nicknamed 'Gossie', is located in the north-eastern part of the Sydney Basin in the traditional Darkinjung country.

The regional city is one of the two shared administrative hubs of the Central Coast Council, along with Wyong. Gosford is the central business district of the Central Coast region and is the third largest urban area in the state of New South Wales after Sydney and Newcastle. Gosford has been deemed a vital CBD spine under the NSW Metropolitan Strategy following the merging of City of Gosford Council and Wyong Shire Council in 2016, forming the current Central Coast Council administration. The population of the Gosford area was 178,427 in 2021.

== History ==
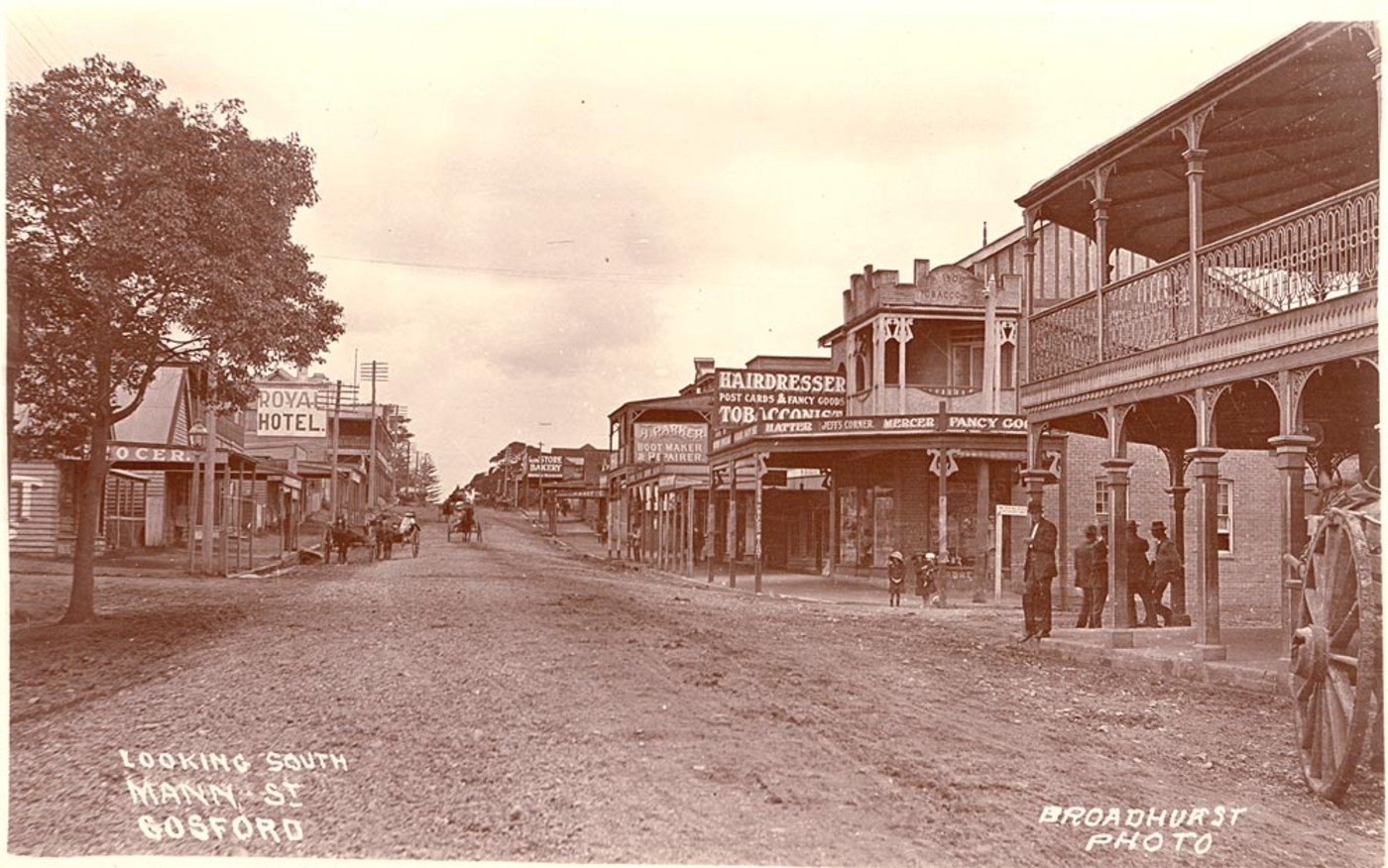
Gosford, prior to 1927

Until colonisation, the area around Gosford was inhabited by the Guringai peoples, who were principally coastal-dwellers, and the Darkinjung people that inhabited the hinterland. Along with the other land around the Hawkesbury River estuary, the Brisbane Water district was explored during the early stages of the settlement of New South Wales.

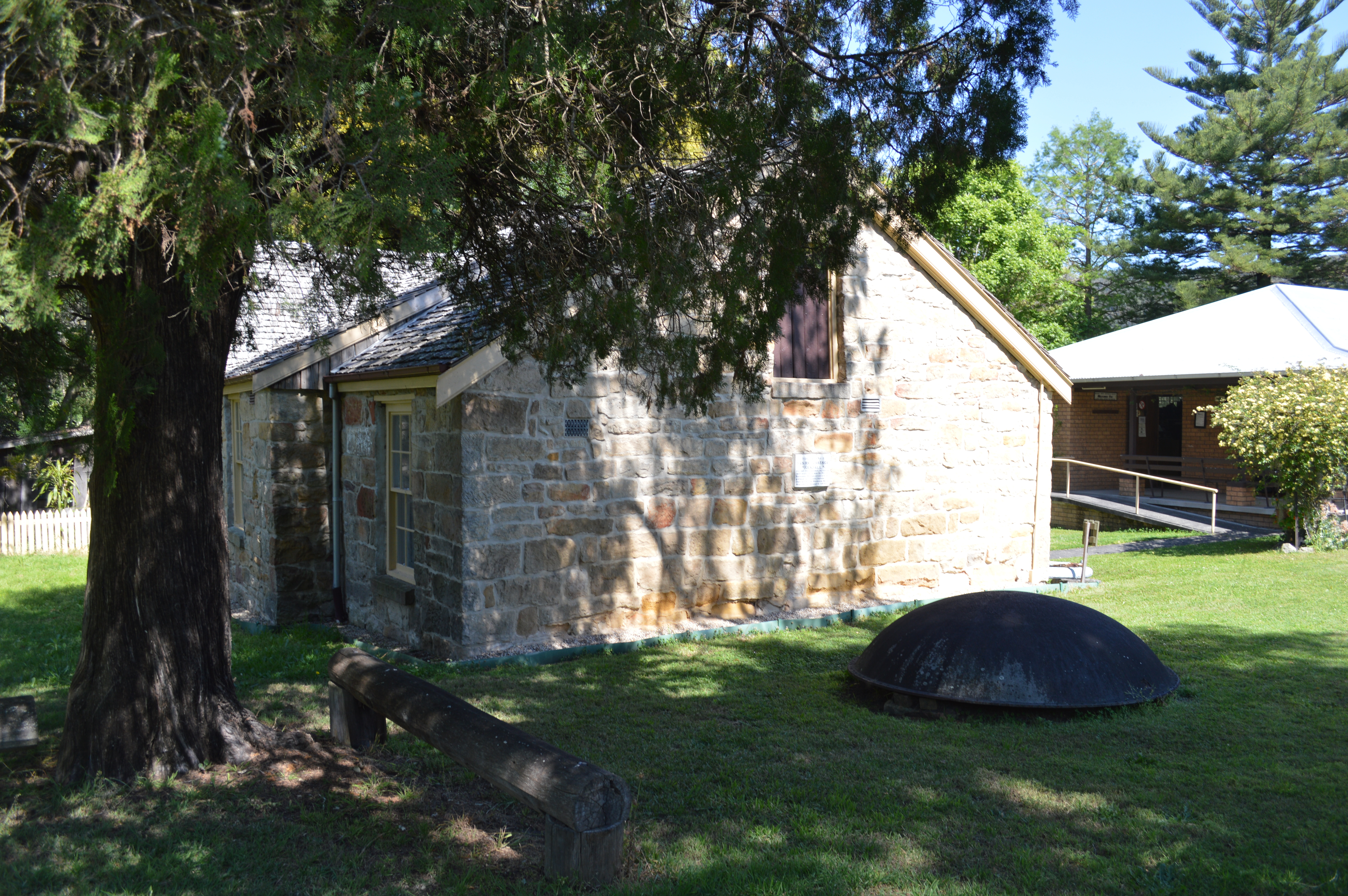
The Henry Kendall Cottage and Historical Museum at West Gosford

Gosford itself was explored by State Governor Arthur Phillip between 1788 and 1789. The area was difficult to access, and settlement began around 1823. By the late 19th century, the agriculture in the region was diversifying, with market gardens and citrus orchards occupying the rich soil left after the timber harvest. As late as 1850, the road between Hawkesbury (near Pittwater) and Brisbane Water was a cart wheel track.

East Gosford was the first centre of settlement. Gosford was named in 1839 after Archibald Acheson, 2nd Earl of Gosford – a friend of the then Governor of New South Wales George Gipps. Acheson's title derives its name from Gosford, a townland (sub-division) of Markethill in County Armagh in Northern Ireland.

In 1887, the Main Northern railway line to Sydney was completed, requiring a bridge over the Hawkesbury River and a tunnel through the sandstone ridge west of Woy Woy. The introduction of this transport link and then the Pacific Highway in 1931 accelerated the development of the region.

Gosford became a town in 1885 and was declared a municipality in 1886. It was then declared a Shire in 1947, and a City on 1 January 1980.

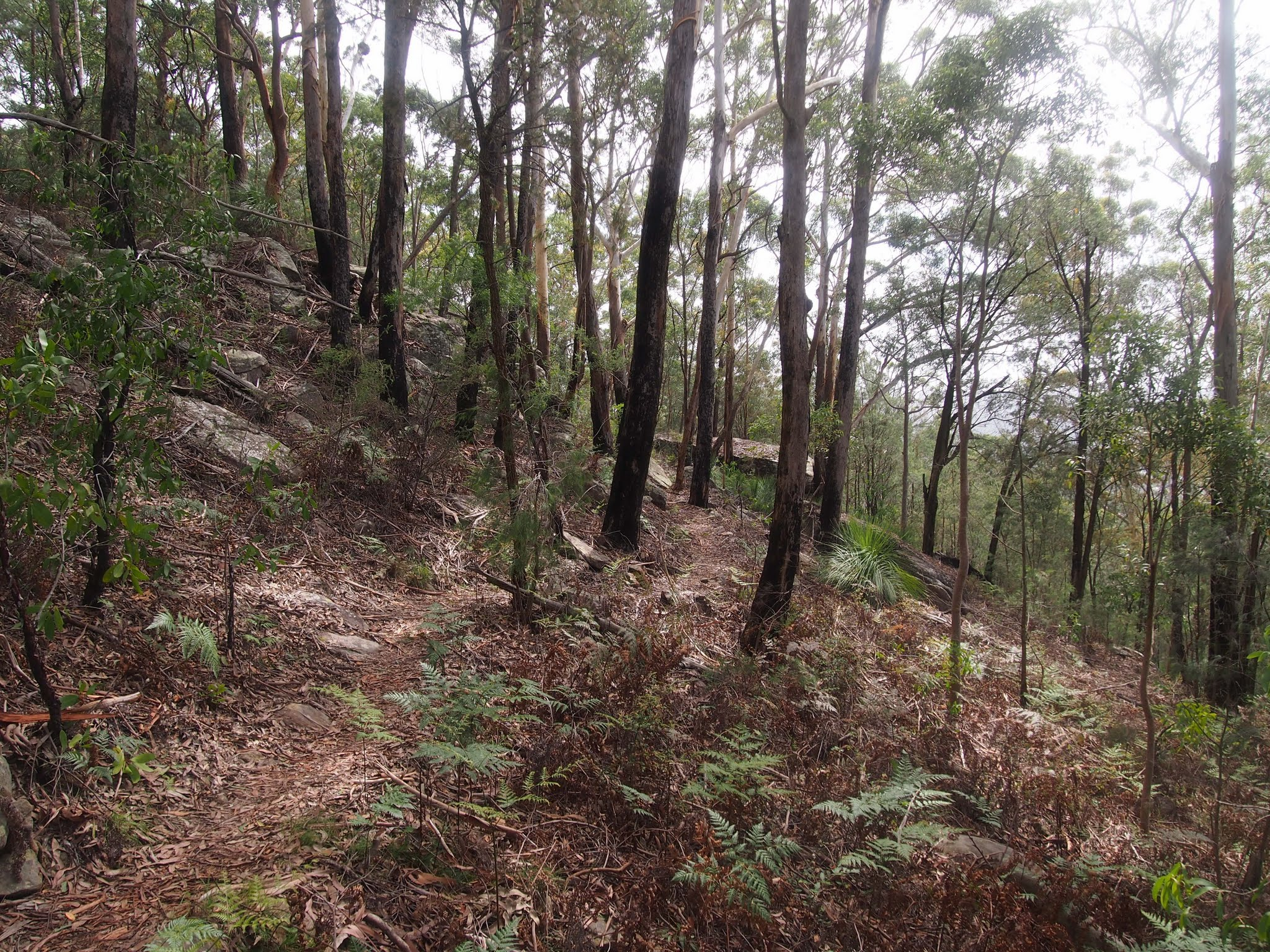
Rumbalara Reserve Gosford

== Demographics ==
As of the 2021 census, there were 4,873 people in Gosford CBD. 58.1% of people were born in Australia. The next most common countries of birth were India 5.0%, and Nepal 4.1%. 64.0% of people spoke only English at home. Other languages spoken at home included Nepali at 3.8% and Mandarin at 3.3%. The most common responses for religion were No Religion 40.1% and Catholic 15.8%.

The Gosford Statistical Area, which incorporates the whole of Gosford's city and suburbs, includes Avoca Beach, Erina, Ettalong Beach, Kariong, Kincumber, Narara, Terrigal, Woy Woy, and Wyoming, and at the 2021 census had a population of 178,427.

== Geography ==
=== Climate ===
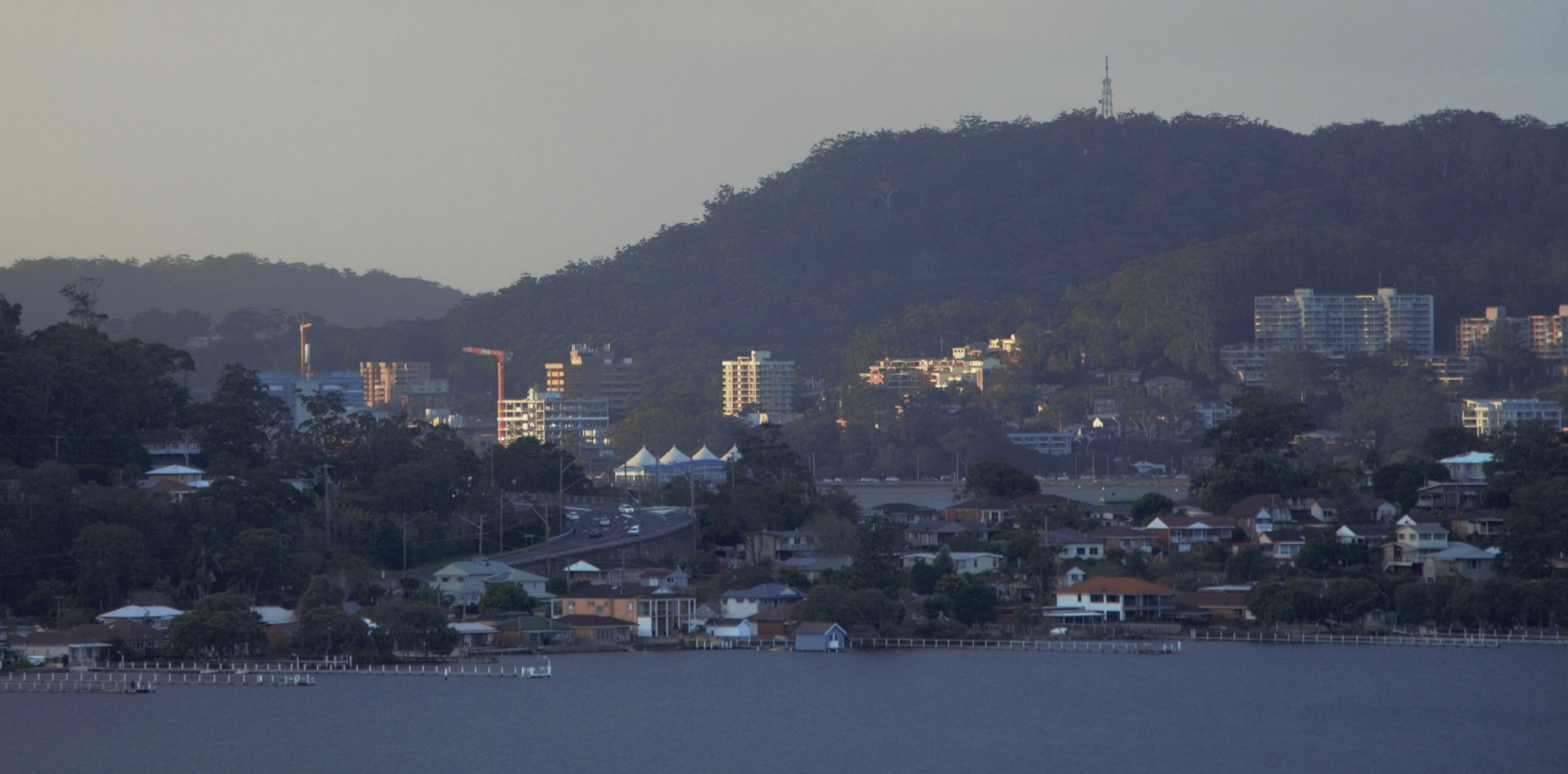
Gosford at dusk

Gosford has a humid subtropical climate (Köppen climate classification: Cfa) with warm summers and mild winters. In summer, temperatures average about 27–28 °C (81–82 °F) in the day with high humidity and about 17–18 °C (63–64 °F) at night. Winters are mild with cool overnight temperatures and mild to occasionally warm daytime temperatures with lower humidity. Records range from a maximum of 44.8 °C (113 °F) on 18 January 2013, to a low of −4.2 °C (24 °F) on 16 July 1970.

Average rainfall is 1,314.3 mm (51.74 in), much of which falls in the late summer and autumn. Rainfall is less common in late winter and early spring because of the foehn effect, as the city is located on the leeward side of the Great Dividing Range. The reason for the relatively high amount of annual rainfall compared to other places in the vicinity is the shape and orientation of the coastline, which makes Gosford (and the Central Coast region in general) slightly more prone to rain from southerly winds.

Climate data for Gosford, New South Wales, Australia (1997–2013 normals, extremes 1954–2013)
Month	Jan	Feb	Mar	Apr	May	Jun	Jul	Aug	Sep	Oct	Nov	Dec	Year
Record high °C (°F)	44.8 (112.6)	43.0 (109.4)	40.1 (104.2)	32.9 (91.2)	28.8 (83.8)	25.0 (77.0)	25.5 (77.9)	29.9 (85.8)	36.1 (97.0)	38.0 (100.4)	41.8 (107.2)	43.0 (109.4)	44.8 (112.6)
Mean daily maximum °C (°F)	28.1 (82.6)	27.4 (81.3)	26.0 (78.8)	23.3 (73.9)	20.5 (68.9)	18.3 (64.9)	17.6 (63.7)	19.4 (66.9)	22.2 (72.0)	23.9 (75.0)	25.1 (77.2)	26.6 (79.9)	23.2 (73.8)
Daily mean °C (°F)	22.7 (72.9)	22.3 (72.1)	20.8 (69.4)	17.7 (63.9)	14.6 (58.3)	12.5 (54.5)	11.6 (52.9)	12.5 (54.5)	15.3 (59.5)	17.4 (63.3)	19.5 (67.1)	21.2 (70.2)	17.3 (63.2)
Mean daily minimum °C (°F)	17.3 (63.1)	17.2 (63.0)	15.5 (59.9)	12.1 (53.8)	8.6 (47.5)	6.7 (44.1)	5.5 (41.9)	5.6 (42.1)	8.3 (46.9)	10.8 (51.4)	13.8 (56.8)	15.7 (60.3)	11.4 (52.6)
Record low °C (°F)	7.5 (45.5)	9.7 (49.5)	5.8 (42.4)	1.5 (34.7)	0.1 (32.2)	−1.5 (29.3)	−4.2 (24.4)	−1.1 (30.0)	−0.6 (30.9)	1.1 (34.0)	3.9 (39.0)	6.0 (42.8)	−4.2 (24.4)
Average precipitation mm (inches)	107.0 (4.21)	189.9 (7.48)	146.6 (5.77)	135.8 (5.35)	121.5 (4.78)	133.5 (5.26)	77.7 (3.06)	60.4 (2.38)	63.0 (2.48)	73.8 (2.91)	85.0 (3.35)	120.1 (4.73)	1,314.7 (51.76)
Average precipitation days (≥ 1.0 mm)	9.0	8.9	8.8	8.4	8.1	8.1	7.2	5.7	5.8	7.1	9.0	8.6	94.7
Average relative humidity (%)	59	63	62	61	61	62	55	48	51	54	59	59	58
Average dew point °C (°F)	17.0 (62.6)	17.8 (64.0)	16.4 (61.5)	13.5 (56.3)	10.7 (51.3)	8.9 (48.0)	6.8 (44.2)	6.0 (42.8)	8.6 (47.5)	10.7 (51.3)	13.7 (56.7)	15.5 (59.9)	12.1 (53.8)
Source 1: Bureau of Meteorology – extremes 1954–2013
Source 2: Bureau of Meteorology – 1997–2013 normals

=== Central business district ===
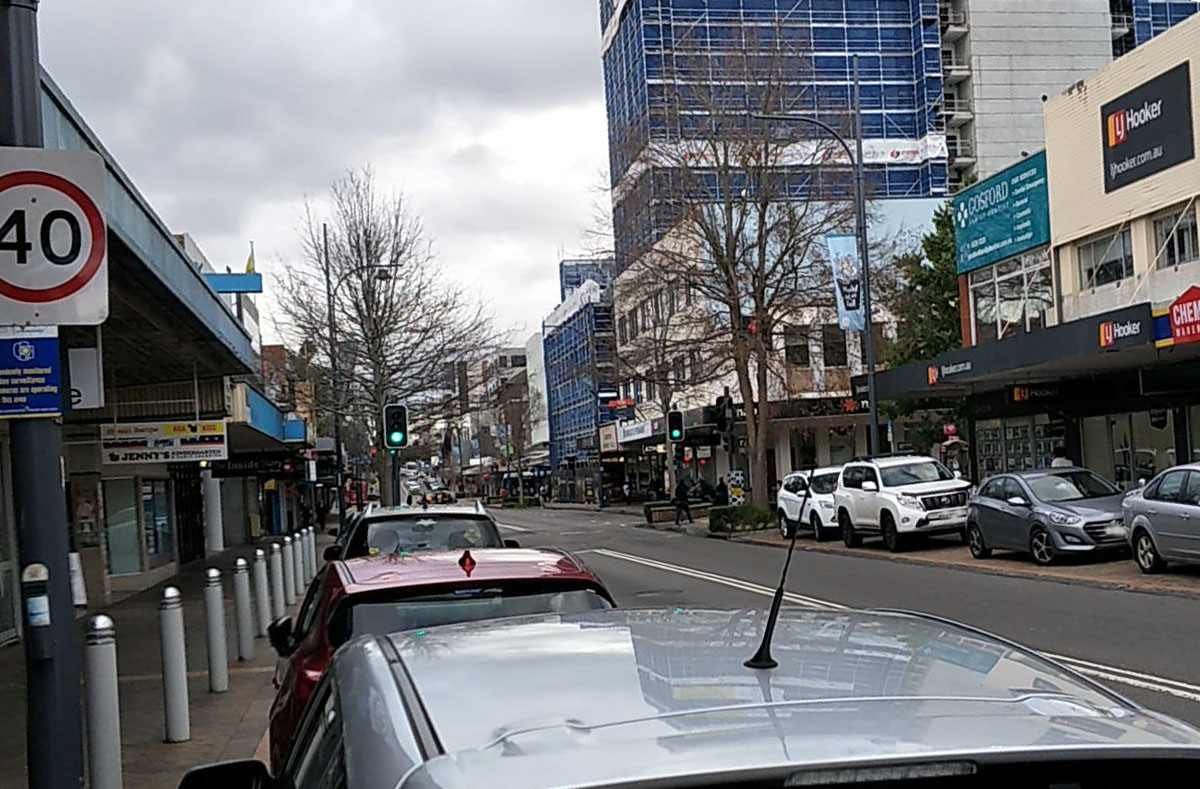
Residential and commercial redevelopment along Mann Street, Gosford 2018

Gosford proper is located in a valley with President's Hill on the city's western border, Rumbalara Reserve on its eastern border, and Brisbane Water to the city's south. Mann Street, Gosford's main street and part of the Pacific Highway, runs north–south and contains the frontage for much of the commercial district.

In the centre of Gosford is a shopping and community precinct, including Kibble Park, William Street Mall, Gosford City Library, the Imperial Shopping Centre and a full range of shops, cafes, banks and services.

A renewed period of optimism has followed the demolition of several derelict buildings and several infrastructure investment projects including the full fibre optic telecommunications rollout of the National Broadband Network in 2012 in the city's CBD as well as the so-called Kibbleplex project, announced in 2013 that plans to house the new regional library, tertiary teaching rooms and associated organisations. The building, formerly known as Marketown, Marketplace and Gosford Town Centre, later became known as Kibbleplex. By 2015, the lower levels of the former shopping centre were vacant.

== Economy and infrastructure ==
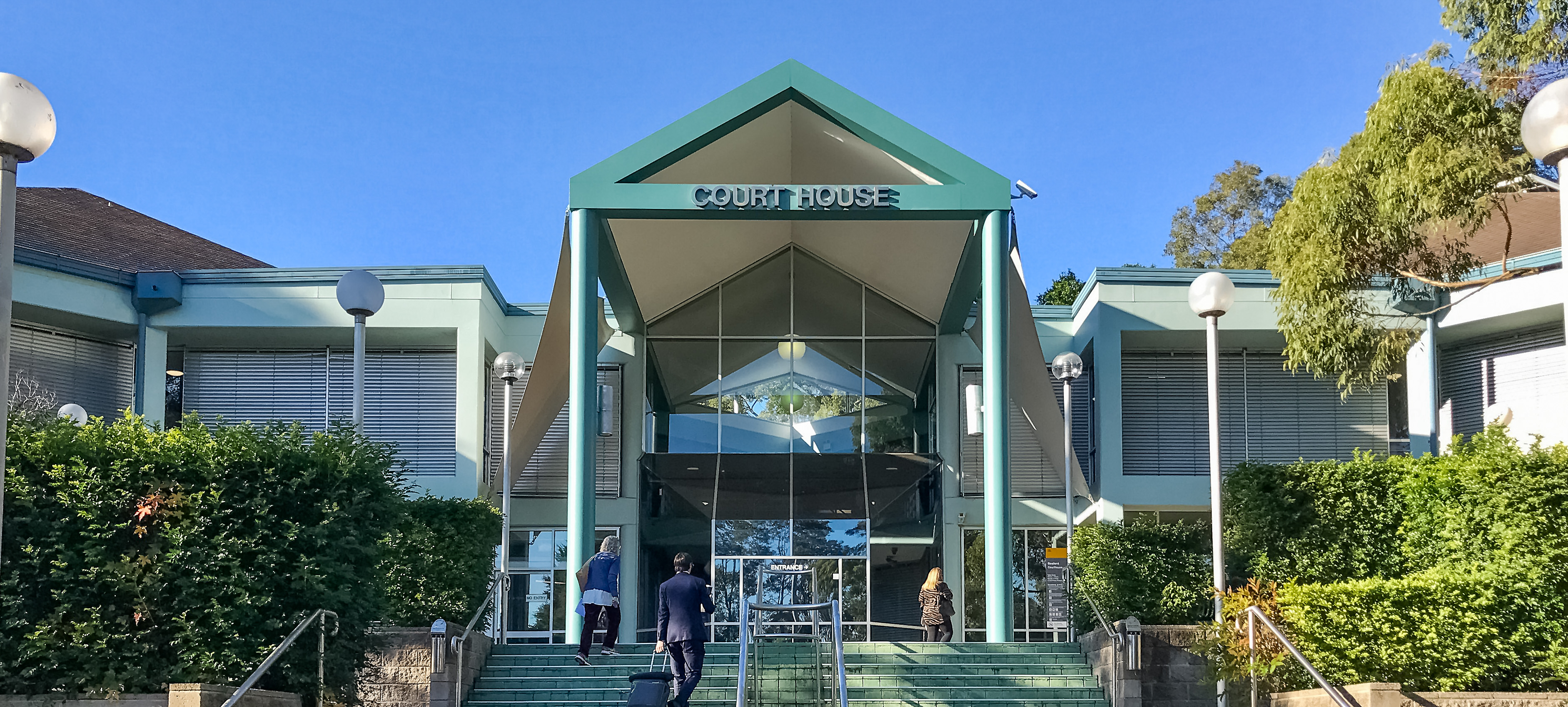
Gosford District Court

Gosford is situated along an identified business growth corridor between Erina, the West Gosford light industrial zone, and Somersby. Connectivity of main roads and rail travel times between Sydney, the Central Coast and the Hunter region are key issues for corporate business relocation to the region. Aged and personal care and retail are major employers in Gosford.

As an entertainment hub, Mann Street has relatively accessible public transport links and is a popular spot for pubs and clubs on the Central Coast. This can be credited to its close proximity to cultural and sporting events.

Yacht and other boat building has been undertaken by East Coast Yachts since 1964 in West Gosford.

=== Facilities ===
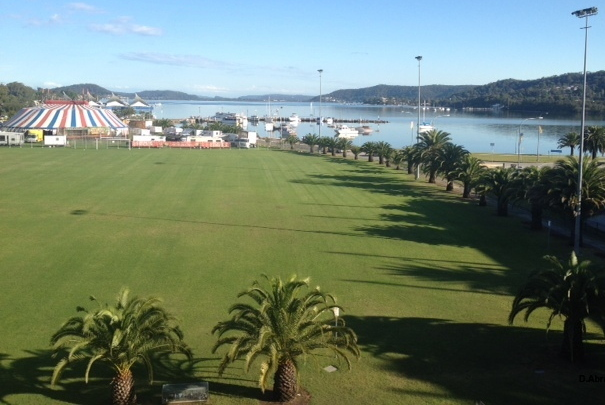
Gosford looking over Brisbane Water

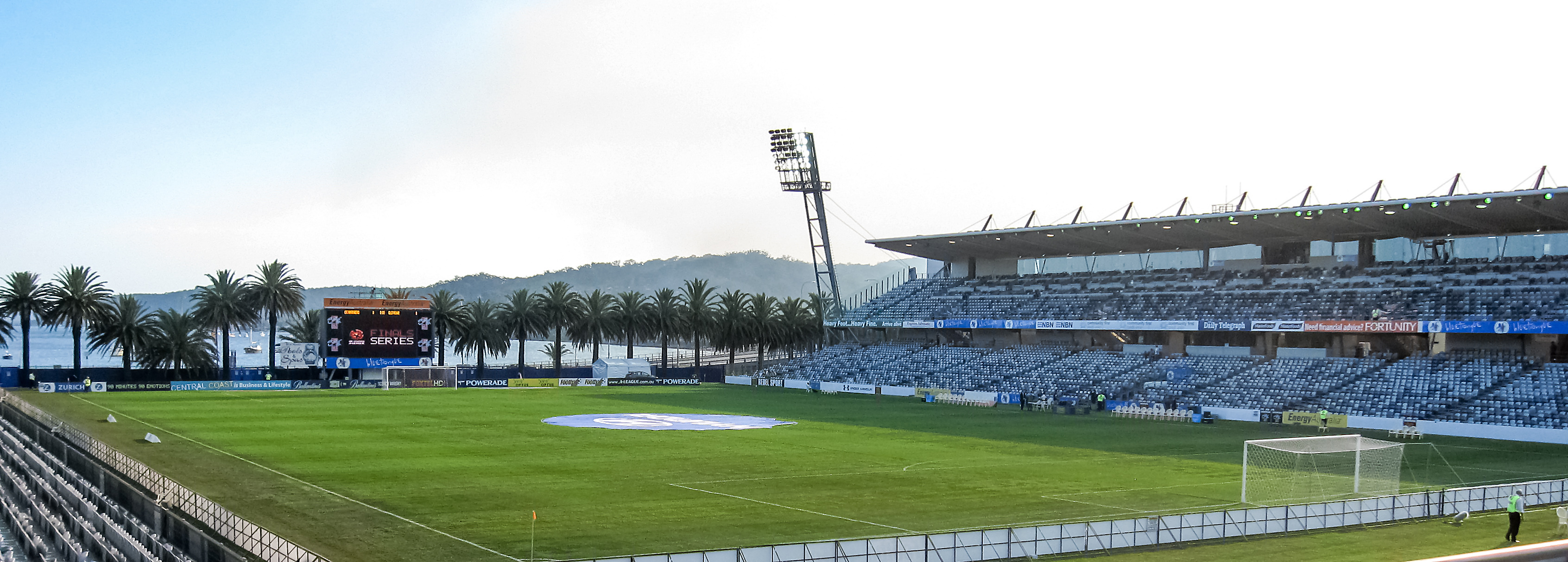
Central Coast Stadium

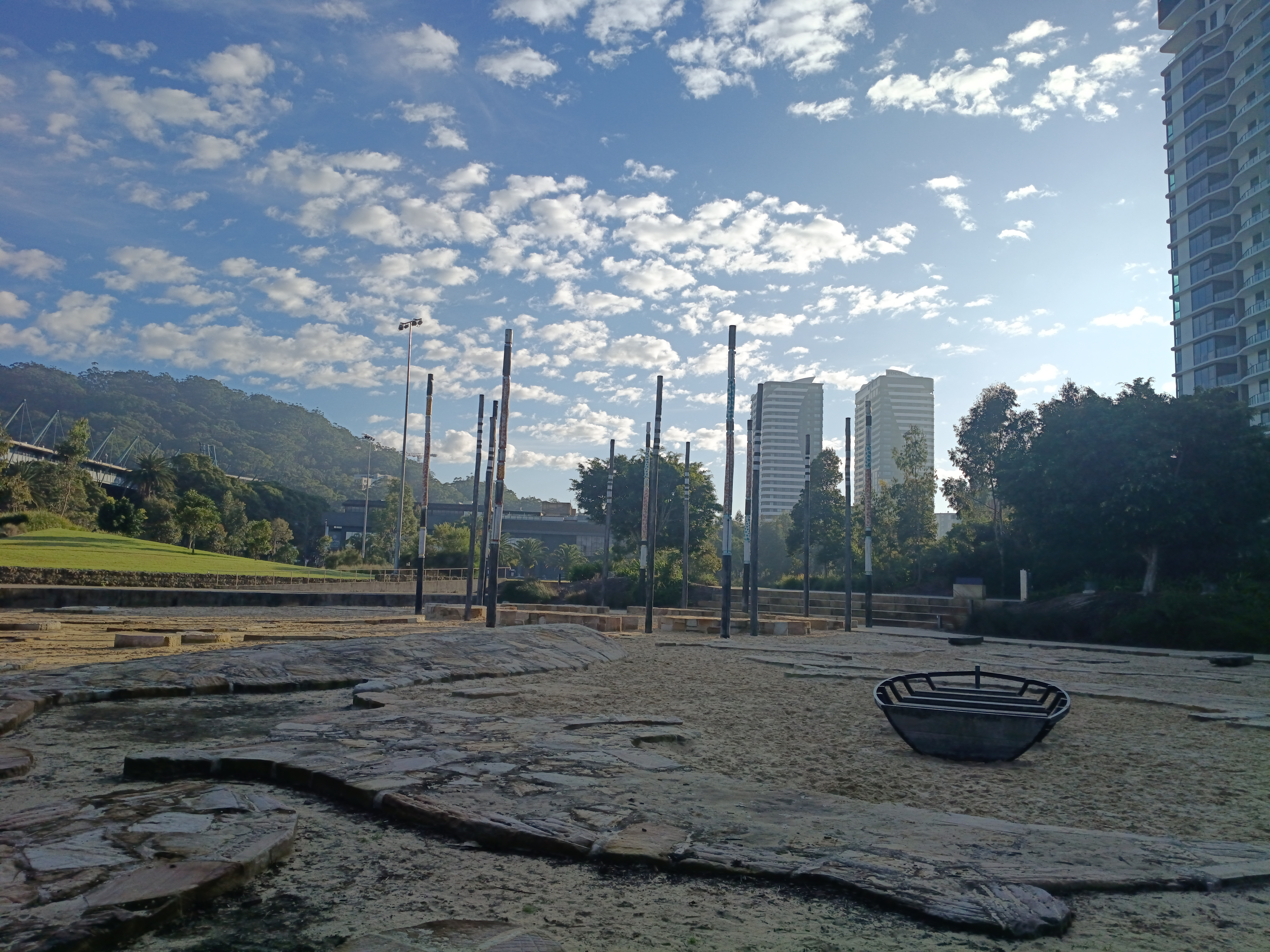
The tidal water play area at Gosford Leagues Club Park, which fills and drains with the tides of Brisbane Water.

Gosford is home to:

- Gosford Hospital — the largest public hospital on the Central Coast
- Laycock Street Community Theatre — the only professional, proscenium arch theatre venue on the Central Coast. Home of Gosford Musical Society who in fact provided financial support in the construction of the theater.
- The Central Coast Conservatorium (in the original Gosford Courthouse)
- Central Coast Stadium — originally built for the North Sydney Bears of the NRL, the ground was instead the home of the unsuccessful Northern Eagles franchise from their inception in 2000 until their dissolution in 2002. Since 2005 it has been the home of the Central Coast Mariners football club. The ground was briefly home to the Central Coast Rays rugby union team.
- Central Coast Leagues Club — is the largest community sporting and social club in the region
- The Entertainment Grounds, formerly known as Gosford Racecourse
- Gosford Showground, home to greyhound racing organised by Gosford Greyhounds and motorcycle speedway.
- The headquarters of the Government of New South Wales workplace health and safety regulator, SafeWork NSW
- Gavenlock Oval — home ground of the Gosford City Dragons, a football club associated with Central Coast Football.
- Gosford Regional Gallery and Gosford/Edogawa Commemorative Garden — the Commemorative Garden is a Japanese garden that was built as a gift to residents of the City of Gosford by the Ward of Edogawa, Tokyo, Japan. They were opened in September 1994. Gosford Regional Gallery hosts the annual Gosford Art Prize. Previous finalists include Geoffrey Proud, Csongvay Blackwood, and Anna Glynn.
- Gosford Leagues Club Park — a waterfront recreation area featuring a tidal water play area connected to Brisbane Water that fills and drains with the tides, along with playgrounds and picnic facilities.

== Transport ==
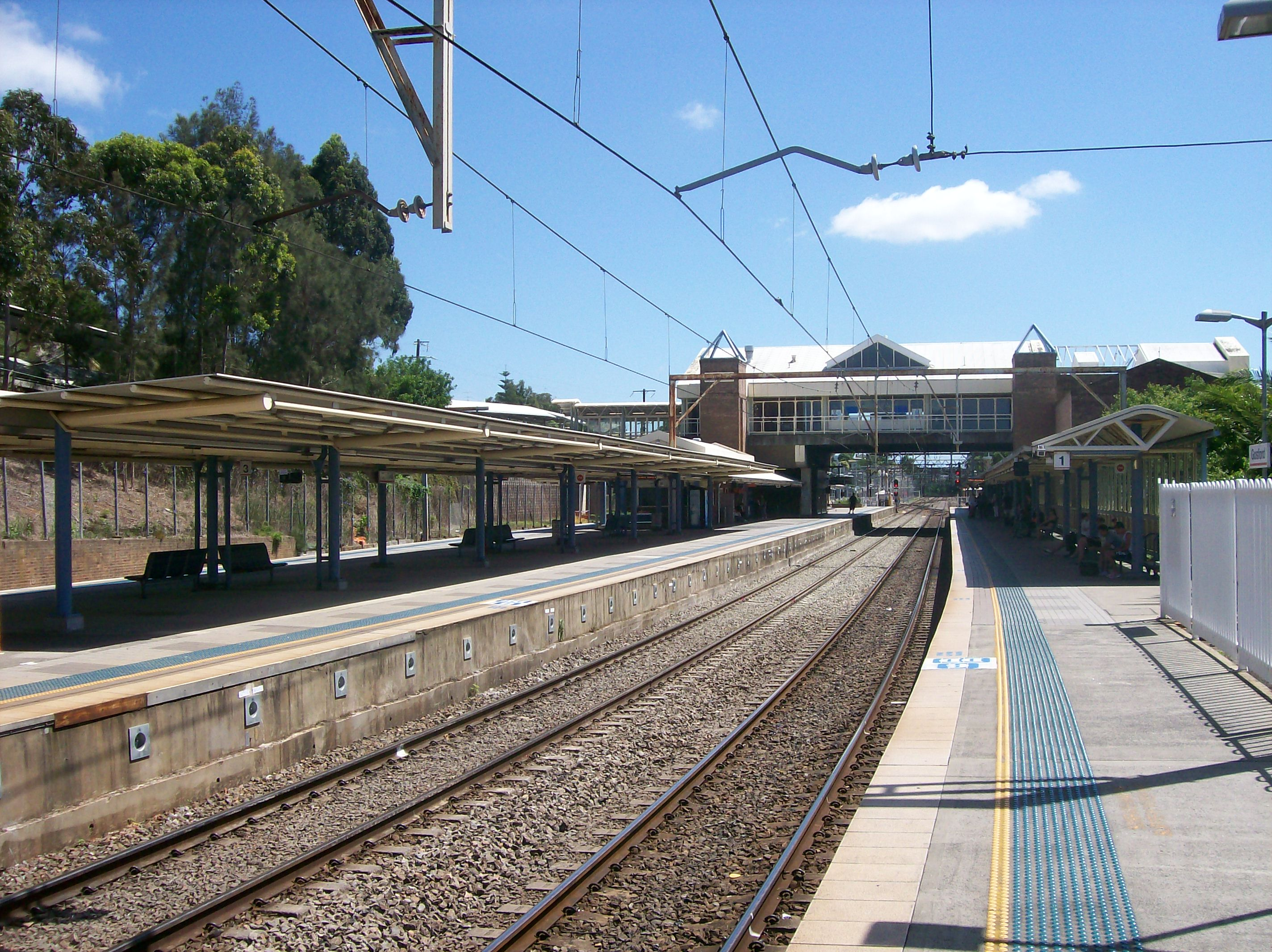
Gosford railway station

Bus services in Gosford are operated by Busways and Red Bus CDC NSW.

The Central Coast Highway cuts through Gosford's waterfront area, while its predecessor, the Pacific Highway, takes on several names through the CBD itself.

Mann Street contains the main public transport links for Gosford, including Gosford railway station, with Sydney Trains services twice an hour in the off-peak to Sydney Central and Newcastle Interchange, with more frequent services in the morning and evening peaks.

Sydney Airport is located 94 km (58 mi) south of Gosford.

== Education ==
- Gosford Public School and Henry Kendall High School in Faunce Street
- Gosford High School – the only academically selective high school on the Central Coast
- St Philip's Christian College Gosford
- St Joseph's Catholic College, East Gosford is an all girls Catholic school
- St Edward's College, East Gosford – is an all boys Catholic school
- TAFE NSW
- University of Newcastle Central Coast Clinical School

== Media ==
=== Television ===
All major digital-only television channels are available in Gosford. The networks and the channels they broadcast are listed as follows:

- Seven (formerly Prime7 and Prime Television), 7two, 7mate, 7Bravo, 7flix. Seven Network owned and operated station channels.
- Nine (NBN), 9Go!, 9Gem and 9Life. Nine Network affiliated operated channels – owned by WIN Corporation.
- 10, 10 Drama and 10 Comedy. Network 10 owned and operated station channels.
- ABC, ABC Family, ABC Kids, ABC Entertains and ABC News, part of the Australian Broadcasting Corporation.
- SBS, SBS2, SBS World Movies, SBS WorldWatch, SBS Food and NITV, part of the Special Broadcasting Service.

Of the three main commercial networks:

- The Seven Network airs a half-hour local Seven News bulletin for the Central Coast at 6 pm each weeknight. It is broadcast from studios in Canberra with reporters based at a local newsroom in the city.
- WIN Television airs NBN News, a regional half-hour long program including opt-outs for the Central Coast, every weeknight at 5:30pm. It is broadcast from studios in Newcastle with reporters based at a local newsroom in the city.
- Network 10 airs short local news updates throughout the day, broadcast from its Hobart studios.

=== Radio ===
Radio stations that broadcast to the city are:

- ABC Central Coast on 92.5 FM which has its studio located on Donnison St in the city.
- ABC NewsRadio on 98.1 FM
- Raw FM on 88.0 FM
- Hit101.3 Central Coast on 101.3 FM
- Triple M Central Coast on 107.7 FM
- Star 104.5 on 104.5 FM
- Rhema FM Central Coast on 94.9 FM
- Coast FM on 96.3 FM
- Radio Five-O-Plus on 93.3 FM

== Sport ==
Gosford formerly had a professional team in the National Rugby League from 2000 until 2002, the Northern Eagles. The club, formed as a merger between the previously Gosford-bound North Sydney Bears and the Manly Warringah Sea Eagles, played its allocation of Gosford home matches at the purpose-built Central Coast Stadium. The club licence however reverted to Manly in 2003 and the club was dissolved.

The Central Coast Mariners professional football club was formed in 2005 to participate in the A-League. The club has won two titles to date, most recently defeating Melbourne City in the 2023 A-League Men Grand Final.

Locally, Gosford is the headquarters of the Central Coast Division Rugby League, which owns the Central Coast League Club in downtown Gosford. The suburb of Gosford has one current club, the St. Edwards Bears, and one junior club, the Gosford Kariong Storm. The Storm were initially a senior club as well, formed from the merger of the Gosford Townies/Giants and the nearby Kariong Kookaburras.

The Central Coast Rugby Union features eight first grade clubs and is one of the strongest local rugby union competitions in the state.

The city also has local Australian rules and cricket clubs as well as basketball and Netball teams.

== Notable people ==
- Craig Anderson – pitcher for Sydney Blue Sox of the Australian Baseball League
- Estelle Asmodelle – model, dancer, and activist. She is known as Australia's first legal transsexual
- Cindy-Lu Bailey – deaf former Olympic athlete
- Bradman Best – rugby League player for Newcastle Knights
- Charlotte Best – actress, known for her role as Annie Campbell on Home and Away
- Anthony Biddle – Paralympian tandem cyclist and athlete
- Matt Burke – former rugby union player
- Alan Davidson – former cricketer
- Grant Denyer – television and radio presenter
- Bill Dunk – professional golfer
- Mark Edmondson – former tennis professional and winner of the 1976 Australian Tennis Open
- David Fairleigh – former Rugby League forward, primarily with the North Sydney Bears
- James Gleeson – one of Australia's earliest and most recognised surrealist painters, also a poet and art critic. His family lived in Narara
- Tim Harding – former member of the Australian children's musical group Hi-5
- Des Hasler – former professional rugby league footballer, former coach of Manly Warringah Sea Eagles
- Nicho Hynes – rugby league player for Cronulla Sharks
- Matt Ikuvalu – rugby league player for Cronulla-Sutherland Sharks
- Allyson McConnell – convicted killer who drowned her two children in Alberta, Canada
- Julia Morris – actress and television host
- Matt Orford – former NRL halfback
- Chris Payne – footballer playing for the North Queensland Fury in the A-League
- Ron Peno – Punk & 1980s Rock musician; Lead Singer of Died Pretty
- Jonah Pezet – rugby league player for the Melbourne Storm
- Troy Pezet – former rugby league player
- Brad Porter – retired Football Midfielder
- Andrew Redmayne – goalkeeper for Central Coast Mariners, previously for Sydney FC
- Sam Retford – actor, known for his role as Cory Wilson on Ackley Bridge
- Mark Skaife – 5-time Supercars champion and 6-time Bathurst 1000 winner
- Ethan Strange – rugby league player
- Matthew Zions – European PGA professional golfer (2003–present), 2011 Saint-Omer Open winner
- Matt Graham – skier
- Jacob Farrell – soccer player for Portsmouth

== Sister cities and twin towns ==
- Edogawa, Tokyo, Japan
- Nitra, Slovakia

== See also ==
- Electoral district of Gosford, a seat in the New South Wales Legislative Assembly
