= Rhema FM =

Australian Christian broadcaster

Rhema FM is the name used for a number of Christian radio stations established with the help of, and assisted for many years by United Christian Broadcasters (UCB) in Australia. Each station is independent, being run and programmed locally with many having moved away from the Rhema name. UCB has also established the Vision Radio Network across Australia, which is entirely networked from UCB's Brisbane studios.

The name and logo of "Rhema FM" was derived from one of UCB's affiliate networks in New Zealand that was then of the same name. See New Zealand's Rhema.

UCB no longer recognises affiliations with other radio stations because it has given up its role as a co-ordinating body to focus on operating as a broadcaster in its own right. Rhema stations, and UCB's own Vision Radio Network retain affiliation with each other by being members of Christian Media Australia (formerly the Association of Christian Broadcasters), which operates as the peak body for Christian media.

== Formats ==
In the majority of cases, the format of Christian Radio is loosely based on commercial radio styles, generally infusing Christian content by means of music tracks and short segments, such as Focus On The Family and other widely acceptable forms of Christian content.

Other stations present talk based formats, such as 3ABN, Faith-FM and similar services.

== Stations ==
=== Current stations ===
The following stations are currently using the Rhema FM name in Australia:

- Rhema FM 89.7 Tamworth
- Rhema FM 94.9 Central Coast
- Rhema FM 99.9 Port Macquarie
- Rhema FM 99.7 Newcastle
- Rhema FM 106.5 Manning Great Lakes/Taree
- Rhema FM 105.1 Wide Bay
- Rhema FM 101.7 Mount Isa

=== Former stations ===
Other stations originally started under the Rhema FM name, but now under another name:

- 1WAY FM 91.9 Canberra, Australian Capital Territory
- 2KA FM 87.6 Katoomba, New South Wales
- 2MV FM 87.6 Moss Vale, New South Wales
- 3WAY FM 103.7 Warrnambool, Victoria
- 4CRM FM 107.5 Mackay, Queensland
- 4TVR FM 92.3 Cairns/Mareeba, Queensland
- 6DBY FM 97.9 Derby, Western Australia
- 6TWR AM 693 Kununurra, Western Australia
- 8KTR FM 101.3 Katherine, Northern Territory
- 96three FM (96.3) Geelong, Victoria
- Life FM 101.9 Wagga Wagga, New South Wales
- Orange's 103.5 Orange, New South Wales
- Proclaim FM 92.1 Armidale, New South Wales
- Son FM 89.1 Mildura, Victoria
- Ultra 106five FM (106.5) Hobart, Tasmania
- Ark FM 107.1 Shepparton, Victoria
- Cooloola Christian Radio 91.5 Gympie, Queensland
- Cross FM 94.9 Broken Hill, New South Wales
- Freedom FM 94.1 Coffs Harbour, New South Wales
- Fresh FM 91.9 Gladstone, Queensland
- Live FM 99.9 Townsville, Queensland
- Ram FM 103.3 Goulburn, New South Wales
- Star FM 90.3 Griffith, New South Wales
- Way FM 105.3 Launceston, Tasmania
- Darwin's 97 Seven (97.7) Darwin, Northern Territory
- Dubbo's 94.3 Dubbo, New South Wales
- Life FM 100.1 Bathurst, New South Wales
- Life FM 103.9 Lithgow, New South Wales
- Loving Life 103.1 Grafton, New South Wales
- Lime FM 104.9 Mount Gambier, South Australia
- Pulse FM 94.1 Wollongong, New South Wales
- Purpose FM 89.1 Port Augusta, South Australia
- Soncity FM 97.3 Geraldton, Western Australia
- The Light 98.3 Albury, New South Wales/Wodonga, Victoria
- Beta FM 102.9 Coober Pedy, South Australia
- Fish Radio 94.5 Bourke, New South Wales
- Good News Radio 103.9 Ballarat, Victoria
- Hope FM 103.9 Esperance, Western Australia
- Juice FM 107.3 Gold Coast, Queensland
- Life FM 105.1 Bendigo, Victoria
- Life FM 103.9 Sale/Traralgon, Victoria
- Riverland Life FM 100.7 Renmark, South Australia
- Salt FM 106.5 Sunshine Coast, Queensland
- Voice FM 92.9 Toowoomba, Queensland
