= WAVU =

- Albertville, Alabama; United States
- Frequency: 630 kHz
- Branding: Power 107.5

Programming
- Format: Contemporary Christian
- Affiliations: Christian FM format, AP Radio

Ownership
- Owner: Sand Mountain Broadcasting Service, Inc.
- Sister stations: WQSB, WKXX

History
- First air date: 1948

Technical information
- Licensing authority: FCC
- Facility ID: 58944
- Class: D (AM & FM)
- Power: AM: 1,000 watts (day); 28 watts (night)
- ERP: FM: 250 watts
- Transmitter coordinates: 34°14′19″N 86°9′59″W
- Translator: 107.5 MHz (W298BG)

Links
- Public license information: Public file; LMS
- Webcast: http://streamdb4web.securenetsystems.net/v5/WAVU
- Website: wavuam.com

WAVU (630 AM) is a radio station licensed to serve Albertville, Alabama, United States. The station, founded in 1948, is owned by Sand Mountain Broadcasting Service, Inc. The station is branded as Power 107.5 after its FM translator W298BG 107.5 FM licensed to Blue Mountain, Alabama.

WAVU broadcasts a Contemporary Christian music format and includes some news programming from AP Radio.
