= Kibble Park =

Park in Gosford, New South Wales, Australia

Coordinates: 33°25′36″S 151°20′36″E

Kibble Park is an urban park in the Gosford city centre on the Central Coast of New South Wales, Australia. The park is a common location for public events in Gosford City.

== History ==
City officials announced construction plans for a library, fountain, and plaza on 11 November 1979. Construction on the fountain was completed in November 1989. It officially opened on 21 November 1989.

== Description ==
The park is centrally located in the Gosford City central business district. The park has seating, a stage, and a sheltered area. The Gosford City Library was located on the southern edge of the park, but was re-located across to the other side of Donnison Street in 2025.

== Events in the park ==
Kibble Park hosts annual public events, such as the Mad Hatters Tea Party and Midday Monster Mash. The park also hosts event for public holidays, such as Australia Day and Harmony Day. On Christmas Eve and Christmas Day, Christmas carolers hold an annual caroling sing-along event in Kibble Park.

== Development project ==
On 31 August 2015, Lederer Group announced a $650 million development project to improve Gosford's central business district. Lederer Group plans to upgrade Kibble Park as part of the project.
