= WKXX =

- Attalla, Alabama; United States
- Broadcast area: Gadsden, Alabama
- Frequency: 102.9 MHz
- Branding: 102.9 WKXX

Programming
- Format: Classic country

Ownership
- Owner: Broadcast Media LLC
- Sister stations: WAVU, WQSB

History
- First air date: June 1, 1992

Technical information
- Licensing authority: FCC
- Facility ID: 957
- Class: A
- ERP: 1,100 watts
- HAAT: 214 meters (702 feet)
- Transmitter coordinates: 33°58′28″N 86°12′24″W

Links
- Public license information: Public file; LMS
- Webcast: Listen Live
- Website: wkxx.com

WKXX (102.9 FM) is a radio station licensed to the community of Attalla, Alabama, United States. The station is owned by Broadcast Media LLC. WKXX broadcasts a classic country music format to the greater Gadsden, Alabama area.

== History ==
This station received its original construction permit from the Federal Communications Commission on June 10, 1991. The new station was assigned the call sign WKXX by the FCC on July 12, 1991. WKXX received its license to cover from the FCC on June 1, 1992.

In October 1992, Kerry Rich contracted to sell this station to Alexandra Victoria Broadcasting Company, Inc. The deal was approved by the FCC on November 20, 1992, and the transaction was consummated the same day.

In November 1997, Alexandra Victoria Broadcasting Company, Inc., made a deal to sell this station to Broadcast Media LLC. The deal was approved by the FCC on January 16, 1998, and the transaction was consummated on April 3, 1998.

On August 11, 2020, WKXX changed its format from hot adult contemporary music to sports, branded as Fox Sports 102.9.

On January 16, 2023, WKXX changed its format from sports to classic country.
