= 4RGL =

Australian community radio station

4RGL is an Australian community radio station located in Gladstone, Queensland.

The station is currently broadcasting as Fresh FM and transmits to the Gladstone Region on 91.9 FM.

Prior to June 2013, the station was known as Rhema FM due to a former affiliation with the United Christian Broadcasters network of Rhema FM stations, but its name was changed to Fresh FM when it underwent a relaunch.

After struggling to find a permanent location for the radio station, the station purchased land from the Uniting Church and constructed studio facilities on the site which the radio station moved into on 25 May 2013.

On 7 November 2016, the station announced that after reaching an agreement with Seven Queensland, it would commence simulcasting the Central Queensland edition of Seven News at 6pm each weeknight from 11 November 2016.
