= XHYJ-FM =

Radio station in Nueva Rosita, Coahuila

- Nueva Rosita, Coahuila; Mexico
- Frequency: 105.1 FM
- Branding: Viva FM

Programming
- Format: Pop

Ownership
- Owner: Grupo M; (Radiotelevisión Norteña, S.A. de C.V.)

History
- First air date: April 2, 1955 (concession)

Technical information
- Licensing authority: CRT
- Class: B1
- ERP: 25 kW
- HAAT: 62.27 m (204.3 ft)
- Transmitter coordinates: 27°56′52.7″N 101°14′42.4″W

Links
- Webcast: Listen live
- Website: grupomradio.mx

XHYJ-FM is a radio station on 105.1 FM in Nueva Rosita, Coahuila, Mexico. It is owned by Grupo M and is known as Viva FM with a pop format.

== History ==
XEYJ-AM 950 received its concession on April 2, 1955. It operated with 1,000 watts daytime and 100 nighttime. In the 1980s, its power was increased to 10,000 watts during the day, and in the 2000s, it moved to 940 kHz.

It was authorized to move to FM in 2011.
