= XHTNC-FM =

Community radio station in Tancítaro, Michoacán

Tancítaro, Michoacán; Mexico
- Frequency: 105.1 FM
- Branding: Radio Cultural Tancítaro

Programming
- Format: Community

Ownership
- Owner: Comunicadores de Tancítaro, A.C.

History
- First air date: April 24, 2014 (unlicensed); December 2017
- Call sign meaning: "Tancítaro"

Technical information
- Class: A
- ERP: 374 watts
- HAAT: 46 m
- Transmitter coordinates: 19°20′32.4″N 102°21′50.1″W

Links
- Website: XHTNC-FM on Facebook

XHTNC-FM is a community radio station on 105.1 FM in Tancítaro, Michoacán. It is known as Radio Cultural Tancítaro.

== History ==
Radio Cultural Tancítaro began operations formally on April 24, 2014, as the first station in town, signing on during the Third Annual Avocado Fair. The unlicensed station broadcast on 107.1 MHz. A lightning strike and lack of resources had the station off air as of June 15, 2016.

XHTNC-FM, on its new frequency of 105.1, was among the last new stations approved in 2017, getting Federal Telecommunications Institute approval on December 13 and signing on within two weeks.
