= XHMBM-FM =

Radio station in Guadalajara, Jalisco, Mexico

- Guadalajara, Jalisco; Mexico
- Frequency: 105.1 FM
- Branding: Millenium Bella Música

Programming
- Format: Classical music

Ownership
- Owner: Mi Gran Esperanza, A.C.

History
- First air date: 1999
- Former call signs: XHMGE-FM
- Call sign meaning: Millenium Bella Música

Technical information
- Licensing authority: CRT
- Class: B
- ERP: 45 kW
- HAAT: 59.7 meters (196 ft)
- Transmitter coordinates: 20°39′4.98″N 103°23′49.61″W

Links
- Webcast: Listen live
- Website: milenio.fm

XHMBM-FM is a radio station in Guadalajara, Jalisco, Mexico. It broadcasts on 105.1 FM and is known as Millenium Bella Música, carrying a classical music format. XHMBM is owned by Mi Gran Esperanza, A.C. ("My Great Hope"), a civil association devoted to serving children with cancer, and operated by Promomedios from its studios and transmission facility in the Verde Valle neighborhood of Guadalajara.

== History ==
The station received its permit in 1999.

XHMBM carries classical music and also transmits appeals for donations to Mi Gran Esperanza.

In 2018, XHMBM was approved for a major power increase to 45 kW.
