= XHNAY-FM =

Radio station in Bucerías, Nayarit (Puerto Vallarta, Jalisco)

- Bucerías, Nayarit; Mexico
- Broadcast area: Puerto Vallarta, Jalisco
- Frequency: 105.1 FM
- Branding: Oreja FM

Programming
- Format: Spanish adult hits

Ownership
- Owner: Grupo Radiorama; (XENAY-AM, S.A. de C.V.)
- Operator: Grupo AS Comunicación
- Sister stations: XHPVJ-FM

History
- First air date: June 28, 1977 (concession)
- Former frequencies: 1400 kHz, 910 kHz
- Call sign meaning: NAYarit

Technical information
- Licensing authority: CRT
- Class: B1
- ERP: 25 kW
- HAAT: 0.6 m (2 ft 0 in)
- Transmitter coordinates: 20°45′25″N 105°15′50″W

Links
- Webcast: Listen live
- Website: orejafm.com

XHNAY-FM is a radio station on 105.1 FM in Bucerías, Nayarit, Mexico, primarily serving Puerto Vallarta, Jalisco. The station is operated by Grupo AS Comunicación, a component of Radiorama, known as Oreja FM with a Spanish adult hits format.

== History ==
XENAY-AM 1400 received its concession on June 28, 1977. It broadcast from Ahuacatlán and was owned by José de Jesús Cortés y Barbosa. XENAY became part of the Radio Korita group, being sold to Radio Impulsora del Nayar. In the 1990s, it moved from 1400, where it had broadcast with 250 watts, to broadcast on 910 kHz with 10 kW.

When Korita sold most of its stations to Radiorama, XENAY was included. Radiorama conducted XENAY's migration to the FM band.

The station carried the Arroba FM (@FM) pop format until June 2019, when it changed names to Oreja FM 105.1, keeping the pop format.
