= Darwin's 97 Seven =

Radio station in Darwin, Northern Territory

Darwin; Australia
- Broadcast area: Northern Territory, Australia
- Frequency: 97.7 MHz FM Darwin

Programming
- Format: Christian music

Ownership
- Owner: Darwin Christian Broadcasters Association

Technical information
- Class: Community
- Transmitter coordinates: 12°27′21″S 130°55′56″E

Links
- Website: darwins97seven.com

Darwin's 97 Seven is an Australian radio station that aims to broadcast the Christian message of salvation to the Greater Darwin and Palmerston region as well as the rural areas extending past Humpty Doo. Along with broadcasting a wide variety of Christian music and secular music, 97 Seven carries content from other Christian radio stations and ministries, including Focus on the Family, Adventures in Odyssey and Enjoying Everyday Life.

It was previously known as 97.7 Rhema FM.

== See also ==
Rhema FM
