= XHEZUM-FM =

Radio station in Zumpango del Río–Chilpancingo, Guerrero, Mexico

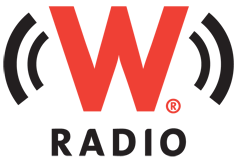
- Chilpancingo, Guerrero; Mexico
- Frequency: 105.1 FM
- Branding: W Radio

Programming
- Format: News/talk

Ownership
- Owner: NTR Medios de Comunicación; (Radio Cañón, S.A. de C.V.)

History
- First air date: November 29, 1993 (concession); 2011 (FM)
- Former call signs: XEZUM-AM
- Former frequencies: 1050 kHz
- Call sign meaning: Nearby locality of Zumpango del Río

Technical information
- ERP: 25 kW
- Transmitter coordinates: 17°34′49″N 99°29′21″W

XHEZUM-FM is a radio station on 105.1 FM in Chilpancingo, Guerrero, Mexico. It is owned by NTR Medios de Comunicación and carries the W Radio format from Radiópolis.

== History ==
XHEZUM began as XEZUM-AM 1050, a daytimer owned by Francisco Alejandro Wong and first licensed in 1993. It was sold to Organización Editorial Mexicana (OEM) in 2010 and received approval to move to FM the next year.

In April 2021, NTR acquired the ABC Radio network from OEM. On April 24, 2023, as part of a national alliance between the company and Radiópolis, 22 NTR-owned stations adopted franchise formats from Radiópolis, with XHEZUM adopting programming from W Radio as its format.
