= XHPVJ-FM =

Radio station in Puerto Vallarta, Jalisco, Mexico

- Puerto Vallarta, Jalisco; Mexico
- Frequency: 94.3 MHz
- Branding: La Poderosa

Programming
- Format: Grupera
- Affiliations: Grupo Radiorama

Ownership
- Owner: Grupo Radiorama; (XEPVJ-AM, S.A. de C.V.)
- Operator: Grupo AS Comunicación
- Sister stations: XHNAY-FM

History
- First air date: February 24, 1993 (concession); 1994 (FM)
- Former call signs: XEPVJ-AM
- Call sign meaning: "Puerto Vallarta, Jalisco"

Technical information
- Licensing authority: CRT
- Class: B1
- ERP: 10 kW
- HAAT: −174.2 m (−572 ft)
- Transmitter coordinates: (FM) 20°38′03.84″N 105°13′48.4″W

Links
- Webcast: Listen live
- Website: lapoderosalaquetegusta.com

XHPVJ-FM 94.3 is a radio station in Puerto Vallarta, Jalisco, Mexico, with FM transmitter at Bahía de Banderas, Nayarit. It is owned by Radiorama and carries a grupera format known as La Poderosa.

== History ==
Logo as "Fiesta Mexicana" until 2018

XEPVJ received its first concession on February 24, 1993. It added its FM station the next year.
