= WMUG-LP =

Coordinates: 40.623°N 79.152°W

- Indiana, Pennsylvania; United States
- Broadcast area: Johnstown, Pennsylvania
- Frequency: 105.1 MHz
- Branding: 105.1 WMUG

Programming
- Format: Christian

Ownership
- Owner: The Christian Witness, Inc.

History
- First air date: September 1, 2004
- Call sign meaning: Worldwide Media Under God

Technical information
- Licensing authority: FCC
- Facility ID: 133191
- Class: L1
- ERP: 25 Watts

Links
- Public license information: LMS
- Webcast: WMUG-LP Webstream
- Website: http://www.wmugradio.org/

WMUG-LP (105.1 FM) is a low-powered, conservative Christian-formatted American radio station, licensed in the Pittsburgh suburb of Indiana, Pennsylvania and serving the Pittsburgh and Johnstown media markets. The station is owned by The Christian Witness, Inc.

== History ==
The roots of WMUG can be traced back to as early as 1965, when Christian Witness founder J.D. Varner was healed from a life-threatening illness. Transformed by the experience, Varner began to search within himself for a gift that he could give back to God.

As a member of Toast Masters International, Varner entered a speech competition. A woman came up to him following his speech and said, "With a voice like that, you could say anything and people would listen." Her comment provided spiritual direction to Varner's life, and he later would act on it through radio ministry.

In February 1966, Varner began a Sunday interview program with average Christian people on local station WDAD AM 1450 in Indiana, Pennsylvania; the only radio station on the air in Indiana County at that time. The program was then called "The Laymen's Witness". Over the next 41 years, the program has expanded from a half hour to five hours, and today is called "The Christian Witness". Varner's reputation in the community as a respected Christian aided in his winning election to the position of Indiana borough mayor in 1989.

Despite his highly successful program on WDAD, Varner for many years aspired to buy or build a radio station in his hometown that would serve the conservative Christian community on a full-time basis. When the FCC opened a window for low-power FM broadcasters after the turn of the 21st century, Varner and a board of trustees he had assembled petitioned the FCC for an FM license. The FCC granted The Christian Witness a non-commercial license to broadcast on 105.1 in 2002. However, the station would not go on the air until almost two years later, largely due to the incredible expense of putting a brand-new station on the air, which required real estate, a studio building, and professional-grade broadcast equipment.

Nevertheless, The Christian Witness pressed onward and was able to secure a hilltop location on Coolspring Road, right at the Indiana borough limit. The Christian Witness was able to choose 105 Coolspring Road (to match the assigned frequency) as the address for the undeveloped parcel of land, and local petroleum distributor William G. Satterlee provided the gift of a studio building (two converted mobile homes) for the new station. Funding also had to be secured to pay Doug Varner Sound Company a modest fee for their excellent engineering and development work and to provide for the overall tower and antenna construction, as well as the transmitter installation. A portion of the work was performed by volunteers who believe in the ministry's cause.

The work was finally completed in 2004. On September 1, the station officially signed on the air.

== WMUG-LP Today ==
Todd Marino served as WMUG's first station manager and as the host of the afternoon "MUG" at the time of its sign-on. Today he continues his duties as afternoon drive person on WMUG and as a co-host of "This Sunday Morning" on WDAD.

Doug Varner has been the morning mug host since the station went on the air and is currently on family leave, with Lillian Clemons in the morning position.

Former WDAD morning show host Bill Otto hosts a weekday program called "Music on the Menu", an hour-long easy-listening music show on WMUG.

WMUG founder J.D. Varner died Friday, May 19, 2023 at the age of 87.
