= WQSB =

- Albertville, Alabama; United States
- Broadcast area: Gadsden, Alabama
- Frequency: 105.1 MHz
- Branding: 105.1 WQSB

Programming
- Format: Country

Ownership
- Owner: Sand Mountain Broadcasting Service, Inc.
- Sister stations: WAVU, WKXX

Technical information
- Licensing authority: FCC
- Facility ID: 58945
- Class: C
- ERP: 2,700 watts
- HAAT: 1949
- Transmitter coordinates: 34°09′27″N 86°02′44″W

Links
- Public license information: Public file; LMS
- Webcast: http://streamdb3web.securenetsystems.net/v5/WQSB
- Website: wqsb.com

WQSB (105.1 FM) is a radio station licensed to serve Albertville, Alabama, United States. The station is owned by Sand Mountain Broadcasting Service, Inc.

It broadcasts a country music format to the greater Gadsden, Alabama area. WQSB currently is known as the Country Giant in Albertville, Alabama at 105.1 FM.

WQSB airs Alabama's #1 high school football scoreboard show.
