= KMEC-LP =

Radio station in Ukiah, California

- Ukiah, California; United States
- Broadcast area: Metro Ukiah
- Frequency: 105.1 MHz
- Branding: KMEC 105.1

Programming
- Format: Variety

Ownership
- Owner: Mendocino Environmental Center

History
- First air date: December 2, 2005
- Call sign meaning: Mendocino Environmental Center

Technical information
- Licensing authority: FCC
- Facility ID: 124562
- Class: L1
- ERP: 75 watts
- HAAT: −180.5 meters (−592 ft)
- Transmitter coordinates: 39°09′15″N 123°12′24″W

Links
- Public license information: LMS
- Webcast: Listen live

KMEC-LP is a variety formatted broadcast radio station licensed to and serving Ukiah, California. KMEC-LP is owned and operated by Mendocino Environmental Center. The station was assigned the KMEC-LP call sign on August 12, 2003, and was licensed on December 2, 2005.
