= CFIC-FM =

First Nations radio station in Quebec, Canada

Coordinates: 48°00′52″N 66°41′22″W

- Listuguj, Quebec; Canada
- Frequency: 105.1 MHz

Programming
- Format: First Nations community radio

Ownership
- Owner: Micmac Historical Cultural Arts Society

History
- First air date: 1995

Technical information
- Class: LP
- ERP: 50 watts vertical polarization only
- HAAT: −27 metres (−89 ft)

CFIC-FM is a First Nations community radio format operates at 105.1 FM in Listuguj, Quebec, Canada.

== Background ==
Owned by Micmac Historical Cultural Arts Society, the station was licensed in 1999. The radio station was started in 1995 with a Native American music format.
