= KBLP =

- Lindsay, Oklahoma; United States
- Frequency: 105.1 MHz
- Branding: Oklahoma Country 105

Programming
- Format: Country music
- Affiliations: Citadel Media

Ownership
- Owner: Jason Wollenberg and Kevin Scruggs; (KBLP Partners, LLC)

History
- First air date: 1989

Technical information
- Licensing authority: FCC
- Facility ID: 60727
- Class: A
- ERP: 2,000 watts
- HAAT: 172 meters (564 ft)
- Transmitter coordinates: 34°54′1″N 97°33′56″W

Links
- Public license information: Public file; LMS
- Webcast: http://stream.kblpradio.com:8000/stream
- Website: http://www.kblpradio.com/

KBLP (105.1 FM, "Oklahoma Country 105") is a radio station broadcasting a country music format. Licensed to Lindsay, Oklahoma, United States, the station is currently owned by Jason Wollenberg and Kevin Scruggs, through licensee KBLP Partners, LLC, and features programming from Citadel Media.

== History ==
The Federal Communications Commission issued a construction permit for the station on January 12, 1988. The station was assigned the KBLP call sign on February 10, 1988, and received its license to cover on June 26, 1989.

logo under sports talk format
