= KVTY =

- Lewiston, Idaho; United States
- Broadcast area: Lewiston area
- Frequency: 105.1 MHz
- Branding: 105.1 The River

Programming
- Format: Hot adult contemporary

Ownership
- Owner: Lee and Angela McVey; (McVey Entertainment Group, LLC)

History
- First air date: July 20, 1998

Technical information
- Licensing authority: FCC
- Facility ID: 57193
- Class: A
- ERP: 500 watts
- HAAT: 335 meters (1,099 ft)
- Transmitter coordinates: 46°27′33″N 117°2′18″W

Links
- Public license information: Public file; LMS

KVTY (105.1 FM) is a radio station broadcasting a hot adult contemporary music format. Licensed to Lewiston, Idaho, United States, the station serves the Lewiston area. The station is currently owned by Lee and Angela McVey, through licensee McVey Entertainment Group, LLC.

On June 7, 2021, KVTY rebranded as "105.1 The River".
