= WFOZ-LP =

- Winston-Salem, North Carolina; United States
- Broadcast area: Winston-Salem, North Carolina
- Frequency: 105.1 MHz
- Branding: The Forse

Ownership
- Owner: Forsyth Technical Community College

History
- First air date: March 23, 2015
- Call sign meaning: Forse

Technical information
- Licensing authority: FCC
- Facility ID: 194129
- Class: L1
- ERP: 100 watts
- HAAT: 17.2 meters (56 ft)
- Transmitter coordinates: 36°04′09″N 80°16′20″W

Links
- Public license information: LMS

WFOZ-LP (105.1 FM, "The Forse") is a radio station licensed to Winston-Salem, North Carolina, United States. The station on the campus of Forsyth Technical Community College is being used to train students for broadcasting careers. It signed on March 23, 2015 at 9:00 A.M., after broadcasting online starting in October 2014. The startup was delayed by cutbacks in state funding. The format includes news about the college and community, and a wide range of music including country, adult contemporary, Top 40, classic rock, and Rhythm and blues. Though the station will not have advertising, students in the broadcasting program will learn how to sell time.
