= WXNV-LP =

- Loganville, Georgia; United States
- Frequency: 105.1 MHz
- Branding: Vision Radio 105.1 FM

Programming
- Format: urban contemporary gospel

Ownership
- Owner: New Vision Outreach & Performing Arts Ministries

Technical information
- Licensing authority: FCC
- Facility ID: 196729
- Class: L1
- ERP: 39 watts
- HAAT: 49 metres (161 ft)
- Transmitter coordinates: 33°46′47.80″N 83°51′9.20″W

Links
- Public license information: LMS
- Webcast: Listen Live

WXNV-LP (105.1 FM) is a Christian radio station licensed to serve the community of Loganville, Georgia, United States. The station is owned by New Vision Outreach & Performing Arts Ministries, and airs an urban contemporary gospel format.

The station was assigned the WXNV-LP call letters by the Federal Communications Commission on February 7, 2015.
