= KZQD =

Radio station in Liberal, Kansas

- Liberal, Kansas; United States
- Broadcast area: Southwest Kansas
- Frequency: 105.1 MHz
- Branding: Radio Libertad

Programming
- Format: Silent

Ownership
- Owner: Mario Loredo

History
- First air date: 1998

Technical information
- Licensing authority: FCC
- Facility ID: 14982
- Class: C2
- ERP: 50,000 watts
- HAAT: 118 meters (387 ft)
- Transmitter coordinates: 37°2′53″N 100°54′34″W

Links
- Public license information: Public file; LMS
- Webcast: Listen live
- Website: Official website

KZQD (105.1 FM, "Radio Libertad") is a currently silent radio station broadcasting a Spanish variety format. Licensed to Liberal, Kansas, United States, the station serves the Southwest Kansas area. The station is currently owned by Mario Loredo.

== History ==
The Federal Communications Commission issued a construction permit for the station on August 13, 1991. The station was assigned the KZQD call sign on October 4, 1991, and received its license to cover on January 30, 1998.

Former logo
