= WPFL =

Coordinates: 31.119°N 87.268°W

- Century, Florida; United States
- Broadcast area: Pensacola, Florida
- Frequency: 105.1 MHz
- Branding: Legends 105.1

Programming
- Format: Classic Country

Ownership
- Owner: Tri-County Broadcasting

History
- Call sign meaning: W Pensacola FLorida

Technical information
- Licensing authority: FCC
- Facility ID: 74576
- Class: C3
- ERP: 8,600 watts
- HAAT: 170.1 meters

Links
- Public license information: Public file; LMS
- Website: http://www.wpflradio.com

WPFL (105.1 FM, "Legends 105.1") is a classic country music formatted radio station in the Pensacola, Florida, market owned by Tri-County Broadcasting, Inc. The station is licensed to serve the community of Century, Florida.
