= KXMX =

Radio station in Muldrow, Oklahoma (Fort Smith, Arkansas)

- Muldrow, Oklahoma; United States
- Broadcast area: Fort Smith, Arkansas
- Frequency: 105.1 MHz
- Branding: Mix 105.1

Programming
- Format: Variety

Ownership
- Owner: M&M Media Group, LLC

Technical information
- Licensing authority: FCC
- Facility ID: 189538
- Class: A
- ERP: 6,000 watts
- HAAT: 98 meters (322 ft)
- Transmitter coordinates: 35.51364°N 94.58836°W

Links
- Public license information: Public file; LMS
- Webcast: Listen live
- Website: kxmx.com

KXMX (105.1 FM) is a radio station licensed to serve Muldrow, Oklahoma. The station broadcasts a variety format and is owned by G2 Media Group LLC.
