= Rhema FM Central Coast =

Christian radio station in Australia

Coordinates: 32°55′30″S 151°45′25.6″E

Rhema 94.9 FM is a local Christian radio station broadcasting for the Central Coast, NSW, Australia.
