= WBNH-LP =

- Bedford, New Hampshire; United States
- Broadcast area: Manchester, New Hampshire
- Frequency: 105.1 MHz
- Branding: Bedford 105-1

Programming
- Format: Alternative rock

Ownership
- Owner: Town of Bedford, New Hampshire

History
- First air date: February 8, 2016
- Call sign meaning: Bedford, New Hampshire

Technical information
- Licensing authority: FCC
- Facility ID: 193211
- Class: L1
- ERP: 100 watts
- HAAT: −0.6 meters (−2.0 ft)
- Transmitter coordinates: 42°56′48.3″N 71°30′54.2″W

Links
- Public license information: LMS
- Webcast: Listen live
- Website: bedford1051.com

WBNH-LP is an alternative rock formatted broadcast radio station licensed to Bedford, New Hampshire, serving Manchester, and its immediate southern and western suburbs in New Hampshire. WBNH-LP is owned and operated by the Town of Bedford, New Hampshire.

The station was assigned the WBNH-LP call sign on November 6, 2014, and was licensed on February 8, 2016.
