= Life FM (Bendigo) =

Central Victorian Gospel Radio (CVGR) was established on 23 September 1983 and incorporated in 1986. Since that time CVGR have conducted many test transmissions. CVGR is an inter-denominational non-profit gospel radio station fully supported and operated by local Christian volunteers.

== History ==
CVGR’s earliest application was for an ‘S’ (Special) Class licence. The first transmissions being from the channel 8 TV site on Mt Alexander in Harcourt. Training of presenters was conducted before the test transmissions began on 3 December 1984. Fog, snow and ice were endured during some of these broadcasts.

The only equipment CVGR owned was a small mixer which was donated. The transmitter was on loan from Melbourne Christian Radio. All other equipment was borrowed from presenters and supporters. The studio and a 2.5 ton transmitter with a 75 ft tower were transported to the top of Mt Alexander where they were assembled by a team of men, about twenty in number and then disassembled and transported off site when transmissions were complete.

Test transmissions lasted a week at a time running 24 hrs with presenters broadcasting on 104.7 FM. By the time the broadcast was completed all expenses were met. The test programmes were short for a start, they were extended over the years to periods of twelve months, most were on a site north of the transmitter hut that we now use today.

As time progressed some equipment was donated in memory of a loved one while other items were gradually purchased as support for the station increased.

When things looked more promising CVGR purchased a link transmitter which enabled the broadcasts to have the studio down in Harcourt at several locations, which made the job much better and safer.

On Wednesday, 20 May 1998 a permanent site for the studio was obtained in the Harcourt valley, just 6 km west as the crow flies from the original broadcasting site in the town of Harcourt.

Further advances have been made with the introduction of automated play lists and used when presenters are unavailable. Life FM's transmitter is now located on the top of Specimen Hill.

In 2011 the studio was moved into Central Bendigo and broadcasts commenced on the frequency 105.1 FM.
