= List of radio stations in Southland =

This is a list of radio stations in Southland, New Zealand.

Most Southland stations broadcast to Invercargill or Gore.

== Full-power stations ==
=== FM stations ===
Frequency	Name	Format	Location (transmitter)	Effective power (kW)	Broadcasting on frequency since	Previous stations on frequency
89.2 FM	More FM	Adult contemporary music	Hedgehope	16	1991	Foveaux FM
89.6 FM	Sanctuary	Christian radio	Te Anau (Ramparts Road)	0.1	14 February 2025	Until 14 February 2025: Star rebranded
90.0 FM	RNZ Concert	Classical music	Hedgehope	40	1990	Concert FM
90.4 FM	Hokonui	Adult contemporary music	Te Anau (Mount Prospect)	1.6	Dec 2022	1997 – Nov 2022: The Hits, 4ZA, Classic Hits
90.8 FM	The Rock	Active rock	Hedgehope	40	1999	1992: Lithgow School Radio; 1997–1999: C91FM
91.2 FM	Life FM	Contemporary Christian music	Te Anau (Ramparts Road)	0.1		
91.6 FM	The Breeze	Easy listening	Hedgehope	40	2007	2001 – 2007: Radio Trackside, Radio Pacific
92.0 FM	RNZ National	Public radio	Milford Sound (Hotel)	0.008		
92.4 FM	Coast	Classic hits	Hedgehope	40	2005	1990s: Southland's 92.4FM; 1996 – 2005: Hokonui Gold
93.2 FM	Radio Hauraki	Active rock	Hedgehope	40	2003	
94.0 FM	Channel X	Classic alternative	Hedgehope	16	8 May 2023	1992–2005: Radio Pacific; 2005 – 2019: Radio Live; 2019 – 20 March 2022: Magic Talk; 21 March 2022 – 30 March 2023: Today FM
94.4 FM	Radio Rhema	Christian radio	Te Anau (Ramparts Road)	0.32		
94.8 FM	Hokonui	Adult contemporary music	Hedgehope	40	1996	4ZG Radio Hokonui
95.2 FM	Hokonui	Adult contemporary music	Gore (High Peak)	1.25	2006	4ZG Radio Hokonui
95.6 FM	95-6ZM	Contemporary hit radio	Hedgehope	40	1997	96ZM
96.0 FM	More FM Southland	Adult contemporary music	Te Anau (Mount Prospect)	1.6	2007	
96.4 FM	Radio Southland 96.4	Community radio	Forest Hill	3.2	1992	
97.2 FM	The Edge	Contemporary hit radio	Hedgehope	16	1999	
98.0 FM	The Sound	Classic rock	Hedgehope	16	1999	1989: Southland Polytechnic; 1990: Crossfire FM; 1992: Southland's 98FM; 1997–1999 Lite FM; Solid Gold
98.4 FM	Brian FM	Adult contemporary/Classic rock	Te Anau (Ramparts Road)	0.1	2022	
98.8 FM	The Hits 98.8	Adult contemporary music	Hedgehope	40	1991	4ZA, Classic Hits 98.8 ZAFM
99.2 FM	Radio Rhema	Christian radio	Gore (High Peak)	1	13 April 2023	Rhema Switzers Road Tapanui until 13 April 2023
99.2 FM	Silent		Te Anau (Milford Crescent)	0.1		2015–? Ski FM, The Basin
99.6 FM	Tahu FM	Urban contemporary & Iwi radio	Forest Hill	8	2000	Iwi Radio
100.0 FM	Life FM	Contemporary hit radio	North Southland (Mid Dome)	2	2005	
101.2 FM	RNZ National	Public radio	Hedgehope	8	2004	
101.6 FM	RNZ National	Public radio	Te Anau (Ramparts Road)	0.2		
103.6 FM	PMN 531	Pacific radio	Forest Hill	4	2002	
104.0 FM	Brian FM	Adult contemporary/Classic rock	Gore (High Peak)	1	24 December 2022	
104.0 FM	Brian FM	Adult contemporary/Classic rock	Milford Sound (Downer Comm Hut)	0.008	24 January 2022	
105.2 FM	Newstalk ZB	Talk radio	Hedgehope	40	22 April 2026	Country Radio
105.6 FM	Life FM	Contemporary Christian music	Gore (High Peak)	1	2004	Moved from Croydon Bush to High Peak 13 April 2023
106.0 FM	Breeze Classic	1970s	Hedgehope	16	1 November 2025	2015 – 31 October 2025: Magic
106.4 FM	Cave FM	Community radio	Gore (High Peak)	1	2015	Moved from Croydon Bush to High Peak 13 April 2023

=== AM stations ===
Frequency	Name	Format	Transmitter	Effective power (kW)	Broadcasting on frequency since	Previous stations on frequency
558 AM	iHeartCountry	Country music	Dacre	16	4 May 2026	1980–1996: 4ZG, Hokonui Gold; 1996–1998: Classic Hits ZAFM; 1998 – 30 March 2020: Radio Sport; 30/03 – 30 June 2020: Newstalk ZB; 01/07/2020-04/05/2026: Gold Sport
720 AM	RNZ National	Public radio	Dacre	63	1935	National Radio
864 AM	Newstalk ZB	Talk radio	Dacre	32	1994	1956–1994: 4ZA (on 820AM until 1978)
1026 AM	Sanctuary	Christian radio	Tussock Creek	8	2007	1994–1999: Sports Roundup; 1999–2007: Southern Star; 2007–2015 The Word; 2015 – 14 February 2025: Star rebranded
1224 AM	Ceased		Kennington	16		1981–2007: Foveaux Radio; Foveaux FM; More FM; 2007 – 2010: BSport/Radio Trackside; 2010–2015: LiveSport/Radio Trackside; 2015–2020: TAB Trackside; 2021–2024: SENZ; 2024 – 1 July 2025: Sport Nation
1314 AM	AM Network/Sanctuary	Legislature/Christian radio	Dacre	20	2007	Until 14 February 2025: Star rebranded
1404 AM	Radio Rhema	Christian radio	Tussock Creek	16	1987	

== Low-power FM stations (LPFM) ==
Frequency	Name	Format	Broadcast area	Broadcasting on frequency since
87.6 FM	Chopper FM	Music/Talk	Invercargill	23 April 2022 (from 87.7)
87.8 FM	Appears there are uncited future plans Feb 2024			2021–2022: The Drop
87.8 FM	Truelight FM	Christian radio	Gore	
88.0 FM	KAOS FM NZ	Rock music, Hard rock, Heavy metal music	Bluff & Invercargill	07/2022. (previously Kiwi Pie Radio ceased 25 March 2022)
88.0 FM	The Fridge (relay of 88.3 Christchurch)		Gore	
88.1 FM	Otatara 88.1	Pop, rock, alternative, indie, CCM	Otatara	May 2023 (previously CCM FM 1999–2003 Newfield, 2003–2005 Otatara)
88.2 FM	Country Radio	Country music	Invercargill	
88.3 FM	3ABN	Christian radio	Gore	
88.3 FM	3ABN	Christian radio	South Invercargill	
88.3 FM	Lignite FM	Various	Ashers	2016
88.3 FM			Te Anau	Fm Te Anau ceased 2011
88.4 FM			Invercargill	Country Radio ceased 2009
106.7 FM	3ABN	Christian radio	North Invercargill	
107.1 FM			Invercargill	TAB Trackside ceased 12 April 2020; 2009: Waihopai School
107.3 FM	Country Radio	Country music	State building, Invercargill	25 March 2022 from 105.2; previously Classic Gold
107.5 FM	Classic Gold	Easy listening	North Invercargill	
107.7 FM	The Pits FM	Music & Speedway	Invercargill	2020
