= Radio Forestland =

- Tokoroa; New Zealand
- Broadcast area: South Waikato
- Frequency: 97.3 MHz

Programming
- Language: English language
- Format: Adult contemporary

Ownership
- Owner: Radio New Zealand until 1996; The Radio Network after 1996

History
- First air date: 1970s

Technical information
- Transmitter coordinates: 38.2175938°S 175.8721301°E

Radio Forestland was a radio station in Tokoroa, New Zealand.

The station was started by Radio New Zealand as Radio Forestland, broadcasting on 1420AM with the call sign 1ZO. The station was started in the mid-1960s and in 1978 moved to 1413AM after the frequency spacing on the AM band in New Zealand was changed from 10 kHz to 9 kHz. Local content on the station was limited to mornings only, and outside this time the station broadcast the 1ZH Hamilton programme.

In July 1996 the New Zealand Government sold off the commercial arm of Radio New Zealand, the sale included Radio Forestland. The new owner was The Radio Network, a subsidiary of APN News & Media and Clear Channel Communications, which operated as a division of the Australian Radio Network.

In 1998, Radio Forestland became part of the Community Radio Network with all programming outside of the breakfast show being fed from a central studio originally based in Taupo. In 2001 all Community Radio Network stations became part of the Classic Hits FM network with programming outside of the breakfast show based from Auckland. At this point the station became known as Classic Hits Radio Forestland. In 2013 the local breakfast was replaced with a feed of the breakfast show from Classic Hits in Hamilton.

On 28 April 2014, all stations part of the Classic Hits network were rebranded as The Hits. A networked breakfast presented by Polly Gillespie and Grant Kareama was introduced to almost all The Hits stations with the former breakfast announcer moved to present a 6-hour show between 9 am and 3 pm. The Hits in South Waikato contains the same local programming as Hamilton.
