= ZGFM =

- Gisborne; New Zealand
- Frequency: 90.9 MHz

Programming
- Language: English language
- Format: Adult contemporary

Ownership
- Owner: Radio New Zealand until 1996; The Radio Network after 1996

History
- Former call signs: 2ZG

Technical information
- Transmitter coordinates: 38.66625°S 178.02269°E

Links
- Webcast: Livestream
- Website: Official website

ZGFM was a radio station in Gisborne, New Zealand.

The station was originally started by Radio New Zealand on 1010 AM with the callsign 2XG. The station callsign and branding was later changed to 2ZG.

In 1978 2ZG moved to 945AM, the change in frequency was due to the New Zealand AM band changing from 10 kHz frequency spacing to 9 kHz spacing. Coinciding with the change, the station became known on air as The Coaster 2ZG.

The Coaster 2ZG began broadcasting on 90.9FM during the 1990s and was rebranded as ZGFM.

In July 1996 the New Zealand Government sold off the commercial arm of Radio New Zealand, the sale included ZGFM. The new owner was The Radio Network, a subsidiary of APN News & Media and Clear Channel Communications, which operated as a division of the Australian Radio Network.

In 1998 The Radio Network grouped all their local stations in smaller markets together to form the Community Radio Network. ZGFM continued to run a local breakfast show between 6am and 10am but outside breakfast all stations part of the Community Radio Network took network programming from a central studio based in Taupo.

In 2001 the Community Radio Network was discontinued and all stations become part of the Classic Hits FM network, as a result ZGFM was rebranded as Classic Hits 90.9 ZGFM. The station continued to run a local breakfast but now outside breakfast all programming originated from the Classic Hits studios in Auckland. The original 945AM frequency was replaced with Newstalk ZB.

On 28 April 2014, all stations part of the Classic Hits network were rebranded as The Hits. A networked breakfast presented by Polly Gillespie and Grant Kareama was introduced to almost all The Hits stations with the former breakfast announcer moved to present a 6-hour show between 9 am and 3 pm. The local 9 am-3 pm show is presented by Connor Ruston.

The studios were located on the corner of Grey Street and Childers Road in Gisborne which has now been reutilised as a restaurant and bar.
