= Radio Marlborough =

Blenheim; New Zealand
- Broadcast area: Marlborough
- Frequencies: Picton - 89.1 MHz; Blenheim - 96.9 MHz

Programming
- Language: English language
- Format: Adult contemporary

Ownership
- Owner: Radio New Zealand until 1996; The Radio Network after 1996

History
- First air date: 1965; 61 years ago

Technical information
- Transmitter coordinates: 41.5111122°S 173.9550409°E

Links
- Website: Official website

Radio Marlborough was a New Zealand radio station based in Blenheim.

The station was started by Radio New Zealand (which at the time was known as the New Zealand Broadcasting Corporation) in 1965 as 2ZE broadcasting on 1540AM. The station moved to 1539AM in 1978, when the AM band in New Zealand was adjusted from 10 kHz spacing to 9 kHz spacing at this time the station became Radio Marlborough.

In 1981, a relay to Picton was established also on 1539AM with the call sign 2ZF and in 1993, the Picton frequency was adjusted to 1584AM. In 1991, Radio Marlborough began broadcasting on 96.9FM.

In July 1996, the New Zealand Government sold off the commercial arm of Radio New Zealand, the sale included Radio Marlborough. The new owner was The Radio Network, a subsidiary of APN News & Media and Clear Channel Communications, which operated as a division of the Australian Radio Network.

In 1998, The Radio Network grouped all their local stations in smaller markets together to form the Community Radio Network. Radio Marlborough continued to run a local breakfast show between 6am and 10am but outside breakfast all stations part of the Community Radio Network took network programming from a central studio based in Taupo.

In 2000, the Community Radio Network was discontinued and all stations become part of the Classic Hits FM network, as a result Radio Marlborough was rebranded as Classic Hits Radio Marlborough. The station continued to run a local breakfast but now outside breakfast all programming originated from the Classic Hits studios in Auckland.

In 2001, the 1539AM frequency in Blenheim was used to broadcast Radio Sport into the Marlborough region but continued to broadcast on 1584AM in Picton, until 2010 when it was changed back to 1539AM in Picton, and Radio Sport moved to 98.5FM in Blenheim. On 1 March 2012, Classic Hits ceased broadcasting on 1539AM frequency in Picton.

On April 28, 2014, all stations part of the Classic Hits network were rebranded as The Hits. A networked breakfast presented by Polly Gillespie and Grant Kareama was introduced to almost all The Hits stations with the former breakfast announcer moved to present a 6-hour show between 9 am and 3 pm. With Polly and Grant leaving The Hits in 2017, all South Island stations reverted to local breakfast programming. Scott Radovanovich presented the breakfast show to both The Hits Nelson and The Hits Marlborough until 2018. Today, the station receives a localised daytime show which is hosted by Breffni O’Rourke from the Nelson studio.
