= Wairarapa FM =

Masterton; New Zealand
- Broadcast area: Wairarapa
- Frequency: 90.3 MHz

Programming
- Language: English language
- Format: Adult contemporary

Ownership
- Owner: Radio New Zealand until 1996; The Radio Network after 1996

History
- First air date: 1958

Technical information
- Transmitter coordinates: 40.9508696°S 175.6525697°E

Links
- Website: Official website

Wairarapa FM was a radio station in Wairarapa, New Zealand broadcasting from studios in Masterton.

The station was started by Radio New Zealand (which at the time was known as the National Broadcasting Service) in 1958 on 840AM with the callsign 2XB. The station was originally branded as its callsign 2XB. In 1968 2XB changed became known as 2ZD when the station changed callsigns. In 1978 the station moved to 846AM when AM frequency spacing in New Zealand was adjusted from 10 kHz to 9 kHz. During the 1980s the station became known on air as Radio Wairarapa.

In July 1996 the New Zealand Government sold off the commercial arm of Radio New Zealand, the sale included Radio Wairarapa. The new owner was The Radio Network, a subsidiary of APN News & Media and Clear Channel Communications, which operated as a division of the Australian Radio Network.

In 1998 The Radio Network grouped all their local stations in smaller markets together to form the Community Radio Network. The station continued to run a local breakfast show between 6 am and 10 am but outside breakfast all stations part of the Community Radio Network took network programming from a central studio based in Taupo. Coinciding with the change Radio Wairarapa began broadcasting on 90.1FM and renamed to 90.1 Wairarapa FM.

In 2001 the Community Radio Network was discontinued and all stations become part of the Classic Hits FM network, as a result Wairarapa FM was rebranded as Classic Hits Wairarapa FM. The station continued to run a local breakfast but now outside breakfast all programming originated from the Classic Hits studios in Auckland.

In 2010 the station moved to 90.3FM are part of a government alignment of frequencies around New Zealand, at this point the station became known as Classic Hits 90.3

In 2013 the local breakfast show was dropped and Wairarapa listeners began hearing the Classic Hits Wellington breakfast show instead.

On April 28, 2014, all stations part of the Classic Hits network were rebranded as The Hits. A networked breakfast presented by Polly Gillespie and Grant Kareama was introduced to almost all The Hits stations with the former breakfast announcer moved to present a 6-hour show between 9 am and 3 pm. As the Wairarapa station already previously ran the local Wellington breakfast, and contained no local Waiarapa programming, the change was to run both the network breakfast and daytime show creating a complete networked station.
