= King Country Radio =

Coordinates: 38.885°S 175.2637°E

King Country Radio was a radio station in Taumarunui broadcasting on 1512AM. The station was first started in 1966 broadcasting 1520AM with the call sign 1ZU. The station moved to 1512AM in 1978 after the AM frequency spacing in New Zealand was adjusted from 10 kHz to 9 kHz. Local content on the station was limited to mornings only outside this time the station broadcast 1ZH from Hamilton or National Radio. During the late 1980s and 1990s the station shared air time with Radio Waitomo and on air the station was announced as King Country Radio and Radio Waitomo all programming originated from King Country studios.

In July 1996 the New Zealand Government sold off the commercial arm of Radio New Zealand, the sale included King Country Radio. The new owner was The Radio Network, a subsidiary of APN News & Media and Clear Channel Communications, which operated as a division of the Australian Radio Network.

In 1998 King Country Radio became part of the Community Radio Network with all programming outside of the breakfast show being fed from a central studio originally based in Taupo.

In December 2000 all Community Radio Network stations became part of the Classic Hits FM network with programming outside of the breakfast show based from Auckland. At this point, the station became known as Classic Hits King Country Radio.

In 2003 the station began broadcasting on 99.9FM from a transmitter located on the station's Huia Street premises, as a result the station on FM was limited to Taumarunui listeners. In 2006 the station began broadcasting at full power on 92.7FM with coverage to listeners in all of King Country.

In 2009, the local breakfast show was dropped and replaced by a newly established network breakfast from Classic Hits studios in Auckland, the show is hosted by Jason Tikao (J.T.) and features one localised voice break for the King Country Listeners as well as local weather.

On 8 February 2010, it was announced the station would close at the end of March, due to declining commercial revenues. The station's frequencies were sold to Peak FM and at midnight on 31 March 2010 Classic Hits King Country Radio went off the air and was replaced with Raetihi-based Peak FM.
