= 95 BOP FM =

Tauranga; New Zealand
- Broadcast area: Bay of Plenty
- Frequency: 95.0 MHz

Programming
- Language: English language
- Format: Adult contemporary

Ownership
- Owner: Radio New Zealand until 1996; The Radio Network after 1996

History
- First air date: 1961
- Last air date: 28 April 2014

95 BOP FM was a radio station in Tauranga, New Zealand.

The station was started by Radio New Zealand (which was then known as the National Broadcasting Service) in 1961. The station was originally branded as it is callsign 1ZD and broadcasts on 1000AM.

In 1978, the AM band in New Zealand was changed from 10 kHz spacing to 9 kHz spacing as a result 1ZD moved to 1008AM.

In the 1980s, 1ZD became known as Radio BOP and relocated to the Bay Savings Bank building on Devonport Road in Tauranga. In the late 1980s, the station was known as Hits & Memories BOP

In 1990, the station began broadcasting on 95.0FM and became known as 95 BOP FM, the AM frequency was now used to broadcast an easy listening format as Easy BOP AM. The same year 95 BOP FM relocated to Harrington House on Harrington Street

In 1993, Radio New Zealand rebranded many of their heritage stations as Classic Hits. For 95 BOP FM the station became known as Classic Hits 95 BOP FM. In the early nineties, Radio New Zealand also began rolling Newstalk ZB out across the country. The 1008AM frequency was replaced with Newstalk ZB.

In July 1996, the New Zealand Government sold off the commercial arm of Radio New Zealand, which included, among other things, the Classic Hits branded stations. The new owner was The Radio Network, a subsidiary of APN News & Media and Clear Channel Communications, which operated as a division of the Australian Radio Network.

In 1998, Classic Hits 95 BOP FM was reduced to just 4 hours of local programming between 6 and 10 am 7 days a week. Outside this time nationwide shows based from Auckland took over, and the network announcers simply called the station Classic Hits. The breakfast show was shortened to a 3-hour show in 2012 on all Classic Hits stations and local weekend programming was removed.

On 28 April 2014, all stations part of the Classic Hits network were rebranded as The Hits. A networked breakfast presented by Polly Gillespie and Grant Kareama was introduced to almost all The Hits stations with the former breakfast announcer moved to present a 6-hour show between 9:00 am and 3:00 pm. The daytime show on The Hits Bay of Plenty is hosted by Will Johnston.
