= 3ZE =

Radio station in Ashburton, New Zealand

- Ashburton; New Zealand
- Frequency: 89.3 MHz

Programming
- Language: English language
- Format: Adult contemporary

Ownership
- Owner: Radio New Zealand until 1996; The Radio Network after 1996

History
- First air date: 1937

Technical information
- Transmitter coordinates: 43.9043195°S 171.7446111°E

Links
- Website: Official website

3ZE was a radio station in Ashburton, New Zealand.

The station was originally launched on 873 AM frequency as a local station operated by the government owned Radio New Zealand, the station was originally branded as its callsign 3ZE. The station operated out of the second floor of the former Loan Society Building on Tancred Street, before moving across the road to Highgate House in the early 1990s.

== Move to FM and Change of ownership ==
In 1995, the station began broadcasting on 92.5FM and was rebranded 'Ashburton's 3ZE FM'. In July 1996 the New Zealand Government sold off the commercial arm of Radio New Zealand, the sale included 3ZE. The new owner was The Radio Network, a subsidiary of APN News & Media and Clear Channel Communications, which operated as a division of the Australian Radio Network.

In 1998 The Radio Network grouped all their local stations in smaller markets together to form the Community Radio Network. 3ZE continued to run a local breakfast show between 6 am and 10 am but outside breakfast all stations part of the Community Radio Network took network programming from a central studio based in Taupo. The station added an FM frequency which improved reception and suited the inclusion of a significant amount of music within its programme, becoming 92.5 3ZE FM. 3ZE's AM frequency is now used to re-broadcast Newstalk ZB.

== Rebranding to Classic Hits 92.5 ZEFM ==
On 1 December 2000 the Community Radio Network was discontinued and all stations become part of the Classic Hits FM network, as a result 3ZE FM was rebranded as Classic Hits 92.5 ZEFM. The station continued to run a local breakfast but now outside breakfast all programming originated from the Classic Hits studios in Auckland. In the early 2010s the station moved to the newly redeveloped Somerset House.

== Rebranding to The Hits ==
On 28 April 2014 all stations part of the Classic Hits network were rebranded as The Hits. A networked breakfast presented by Polly Gillespie and Grant Kareama was introduced to almost all The Hits stations with the former breakfast announcer moved to present a 6-hour show between 9 am and 3 pm. At this stage breakfast presenter, Phill Hooper, was moved to the 9 am-3 pm timeslot.

== Replacement with Hokonui ==
When the station was branded from Classic Hits to The Hits feedback from local listeners in the Ashburton region was not positive, both with the removal of the local breakfast and change in music format. A decision was made later in 2014 to network Gore based radio station Hokonui into the Ashburton market using the 92.5FM frequency and have Phill Hooper present a local breakfast on this station to Ashburton listeners.

The Hits remains in the Ashburton region on 89.3FM running total network programming.
