= Radio Nelson =

New Zealand radio station

- Nelson; New Zealand
- Broadcast area: Nelson and Tasman
- Frequencies: 89.6 MHz and 1269 KHz in Golden Bay

Programming
- Language: English language
- Format: Adult contemporary

Ownership
- Owner: Radio New Zealand until 1993; Radio Nelson Limited after 1993; The Radio Network

History
- First air date: 1932; 94 years ago

Technical information
- Transmitter coordinates: 41.2751°S 173.2809°E

Links
- Webcast: Livestream
- Website: Official website

Radio Nelson was a New Zealand radio station in Nelson. The station was started by Radio New Zealand (which at the time was known as the New Zealand Broadcasting Board) in 1932.

The station originally broadcast on 1340AM with the callsign 2ZR. The station changed call signs to 2YN followed by 2XN and finally 2ZN. In 1978 the AM band in New Zealand was adjusted from 10 kHz to 9 kHz, as a result 2ZN moved to 1341AM. Originally the station was branded by its callsign name and did not become known as Radio Nelson until the 1980s.

In 1985 Radio Nelson began broadcasting in Tākaka on 1269AM with the call sign 2ZT. Radio Nelson began broadcasting on 89.8FM in 1992 (around the same time as opposition station Fifeshire FM) as well as on the existing AM frequencies.

In 1993 Radio New Zealand rebranded many of their heritage stations as Classic Hits. For Radio Nelson the station became known as Classic Hits 90FM. Around the same a company called Radio Nelson Limited was registered, it is believed that Radio Nelson was sold to this private company in 1993. At the same time Radio New Zealand was rolling out their Newstalk ZB brand across the country using the AM frequency of stations that had converted to FM. Classic Hits 90FM Nelson however continued using the AM frequency and in the mid nineties was used to run a talkback programme, this station on air was known as 1341 AM – Entertaining & Informing Nelson. The 1341 AM was eventually used for Newstalk ZB later in the 1990s.

In 1995 programming was extended to the Tasman Bay and Golden Bay areas broadcasting on 90.4FM.

In 1998 Classic Hits 90FM was reduced to just 4 hours of local programming between 6 and 10 am 7 days a week. Outside this time nationwide shows based from Auckland took over, and the network announcers simply called the station Classic Hits. The breakfast show was shortened to a 3-hour show in 2012.

In 2002 the station was renamed to Classic Hits 89.8 & 90.4 and Classic Hits 89.8 in 2006 after the station began broadcasting only on 89.8FM.

In 2006 Radio Hauraki was introduced on the 90.4FM frequency which at the time was occupied by Classic Hits, leaving Classic Hits to then broadcast only on 89.8FM.

Radio Nelson Limited was struck off the New Zealand Companies Office Register in 2008.

In 2010 the government realigned radio frequencies in New Zealand, which altered all FM station frequencies for both The Radio Network and Mediaworks. As a result, Classic Hits 90FM moved from 89.8FM to 89.6FM. All AM frequencies remained unchanged.

In 2012, an application was made to the Companies office to register Radio Nelson as a newly incorporated company, by former Radio Network employee, Murray Leaning. This company was registered but struck off in 2013. Negotiations were apparently underway between a group of local investors and the owners of a radio frequency in the district, with a view to Radio Nelson recommencing broadcasts as a private radio station in 2014 however this did not eventuate.

On 28 April 2014, all stations part of the Classic Hits network were rebranded as The Hits. A networked breakfast presented by Polly Gillespie and Grant Kareama was introduced to almost all The Hits stations with the former breakfast announcer moved to present a 6-hour show between 9 am and 3 pm. With Polly and Grant leaving The Hits in 2017 all South Island stations reverted to local breakfast programming. From 2017 Scott Radovanovich presented the breakfast show to both The Hits Nelson and The Hits Marlborough.

Today, a local 9 am-3 pm show is generated from the Nelson studios, hosted by Hayden Rose.
