= Radio New Zealand =

Public-service radio broadcast network

Coordinates: 41°17′06″S 174°46′27″E

Radio New Zealand (RNZ)
- Native name: Te Reo Irirangi o Aotearoa (Māori)
- Type: Crown Entity
- Predecessors: Radio New Zealand (SOE); New Zealand Broadcasting Corporation; National Broadcasting Service; New Zealand Broadcasting Board; Radio Broadcasting Company
- Founded: 1995
- Headquarters: Radio New Zealand House, Wellington
- Key people: Hon Paul Goldsmith (Minister for Media and Communications); Paul Thompson (CEO and editor-in-chief)
- Owner: Minister of Finance (50%); Minister for Media and Communications (50%) (New Zealand government)
- Website: www.rnz.co.nz

Radio New Zealand (Māori: Te Reo Irirangi o Aotearoa), commonly known as RNZ or Radio NZ, is a New Zealand public service broadcaster, non-commercial and Crown entity. Established under the Radio New Zealand Act 1995, it operates news and current affairs station, RNZ National, and a classical music and jazz station, RNZ Concert, with full government funding from NZ On Air. Since 2014, the organisation's focus has been to transform from a radio broadcaster to a multimedia outlet, increasing its production of digital content in audio, video, and written forms, utilising rnz.co.nz and the RNZ app.

The organisation plays a central role in New Zealand public broadcasting. The New Zealand Parliament fully funds its AM network, used in part for the broadcast of parliamentary proceedings. RNZ has a statutory role under the Civil Defence Emergency Management Act 2002 to act as a "lifeline utility" in emergencies. It is also responsible for an international service, RNZ Pacific, which broadcasts to the South Pacific in both English and Pacific languages through its shortwave service, and publishes online news in Simplified Chinese.

== History ==
=== Early years ===
The first radio broadcast in New Zealand was made on 17 November 1921 by radio pioneer Professor Robert Jack. Government-funded public service radio in New Zealand was historically provided by the Radio Broadcasting Company between 1925 and 1931, the New Zealand Broadcasting Board between 1931 and 1936, the National Broadcasting Service between 1936 and 1962, the New Zealand Broadcasting Corporation between 1962 and 1975, and the Radio New Zealand state-owned enterprise between 1975 and 1995. The organisation placed a strong emphasis on training its staff in Received Pronunciation, until it began promoting local and indigenous accents in the 1990s.

As part of the process of privatisation carried out by the fourth National government, the government's commercial radio operations were sold to private investors as The Radio Network in 1996, and the government's non-commercial assets (known previously as New Zealand Public Radio) became the current Radio New Zealand Crown entity.

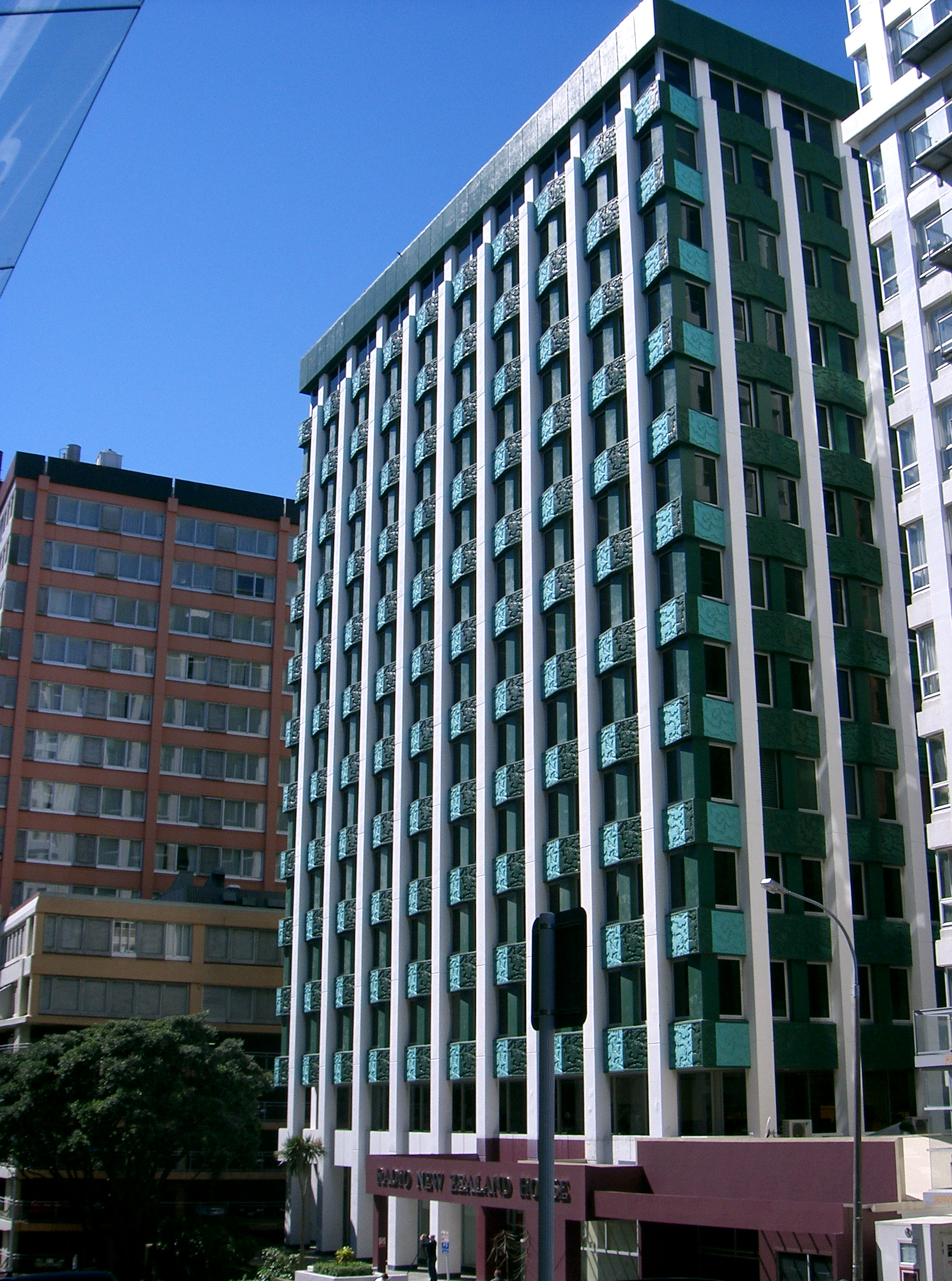
Radio New Zealand House in Wellington

RNZ had its headquarters in Broadcasting House in Bowen St, Wellington, behind the parliamentary buildings. Construction of the Bowen St building began in 1959, and it was opened in 1963. The building was demolished in 1997, and RNZ moved to Radio New Zealand House on The Terrace. In 2025 a time capsule which had been buried in the tunnel between the RNZ building and Parliament Buildings in 1996 was discovered and opened.

=== Later years ===
The broadcaster is bound by the Charter and Operating Principles included in the Radio New Zealand Act, which is reviewed by the New Zealand Parliament every five years. The Radio New Zealand Amendment Act 2016 received Royal assent on 1 April 2016.

Purpose:

- As an independent public service broadcaster, the public radio company's purpose is to serve the public interest.
- Freedom of thought and expression are foundations of democratic society, and the public radio company as a public service broadcaster plays an essential role in exercising these freedoms.
- The public radio company fosters a sense of national identity by contributing to tolerance and understanding, reflecting and promoting ethnic, cultural, and artistic diversity and expression.
- The public radio company provides reliable, independent, and freely accessible news and information.

RNZ broadcasts over three nationwide networks: RNZ National; RNZ Concert; and the AM network, which relays Parliamentary proceedings. RNZ Pacific (formerly Radio New Zealand International or RNZI) is its overseas shortwave service, broadcasting to the South Pacific and beyond, while Radio New Zealand News provides comprehensive, up-to-the-minute news and current affairs information. RNZ also allows for the archiving of broadcast material of historical interest.

It must also produce and commission high quality programming based on research of public needs, and balance mass appeal and minority appeal programming. In achieving these objectives, it must be socially and financially responsible.

=== Merger attempt ===
On 23 June 2022, Broadcasting Minister Willie Jackson introduced draft legislation to formally merge public broadcasters Radio New Zealand and TVNZ into a new non-profit autonomous Crown entity called Aotearoa New Zealand Public Media (ANZPM), commencing 1 March 2023. Under the draft legislation, RNZ would become a subsidiary of the new entity, which would be funded through a mixture of government and commercial funding. The proposed ANZPM would be headed by a board, and operate under a media charter outlining goals and responsibilities including editorial independence.

On 8 February 2023, Prime Minister Chris Hipkins announced that the merger of TVNZ and RNZ into ANZPM had been cancelled, stating that "support for public media needs to be at a lower cost and without such significant structural change." He confirmed that both TVNZ and RNZ would receive additional government funding. Prior to the public media entity's cancellation, the two public broadcasters had spent a total of NZ$1,023,701 on the merger process, with RNZ spending NZ$431,277 by mid-November 2022.

=== 2025–2026 budget cuts ===
During the release of the 2025 New Zealand budget, the Sixth National Government reduced RNZ's budget by NZ$18 million over the next four years (roughly NZ$4.6 million per year). In response, RNZ sought voluntary redundancies in July 2025.

In early October 2025, RNZ confirmed it would close its youth podcast series TAHI, the "Sunday Sampler" and "At the Movies" radio show as a result of budget cutbacks. In addition, RNZ reduced the number of presenters on its "Culture 101" radio show from two to one.

During the release of the 2026 New Zealand budget in late May 2026, the Government reduced RNZ's budget by another $1.4 million, in addition to the $4.6 million annual reduction announced in the 2025 budget. On 9 November 2026, RNZ confirmed during a company-wide staff meeting that it would cut 58 jobs by March 2027 after reporting a record NZ$11.8 million deficit. This deficit was caused by several factors including $2 million worth in land sales being incorrectly accounted as revenue in the public broadcaster's budget, personnel expenses exceeding $3.2 million over budget, $1.4 million worth of redundancy payments and operating expenses exceeding $6.4 million over budget. The over budget operating expenses were caused by several factors including the $1.85 million cost to relocate its Auckland office, $1.1 million being written off following the closure of its former Auckland office and Henderson transmission site, $1 million costs incurred from decommissioning its Henderson towers, and $1.7 million remediation costs from the sale of its Titahi Bay site. The public broadcaster also forecast a $7.8 million loss for the 2026/27 financial year. Outgoing RNZ chief executive Paul Thompson said that he and the broadcaster took responsibility for the result, and would also commission an independent review. These losses had been preceded by the sudden resignation of the broadcaster's chief financial officer Hilary Parker in October 2026. On 16 November, Prime Minister Christopher Luxon declined the use of government funding to bail out the public broadcaster, stating "we shouldn't have to bail out, you know, their mistakes there."

== Radio services ==
=== RNZ National ===
RNZ National, formerly National Radio, is RNZ's independent news and current affairs platform, and offers both its own on-air and online services and those from third party services. It includes the news and current affairs programmes Morning Report (which began on 1 April 1975), Midday Report, and Checkpoint, as well as having news bulletins every hour. Its news service has specialist correspondents, overseas correspondents, reporters, and a network of regional reporters. Magazine programmes include a broad range of contributors, interviews, music pieces, and dramas, with reports and regular features in English and Māori. The network provides coverage of business, science, politics, philosophy, religion, rural affairs, sports, and other topics.

RNZ National broadcasts on AM and FM via mono terrestrial transmitters based around New Zealand and the Koreasat 6 satellite. It is also available on Sky Digital TV channel 421, Freeview satellite channel 50, and is available in stereo on the terrestrial Freeview HD service.

=== RNZ Concert ===
RNZ Concert is an FM radio network broadcasting classical and jazz music, as well as world music, specialist programmes, and regular news updates. Founded in 1975 as the Concert Programme, the network was renamed Concert FM in the mid-1990s, and assumed its current name in 2007 as part of a wider name change within Radio New Zealand to associate Concert FM with the RNZ brand. RNZ Concert was refreshed in February 2018, with several new programmes and presenters, and a renewed focus on live music and storytelling on New Zealand's music and arts communities.

The station broadcasts in FM stereo via terrestrial transmitters located around New Zealand, as well as from the Koreasat 6 satellite. It is also available on Sky Digital TV channel 422, and on Freeview's satellite and terrestrial services on channel 51.

=== AM Network ===
The AM Network is a network of radio transmitters operated by RNZ, which broadcast all sittings of the New Zealand Parliament through a contract with the clerk of the House of Representatives. Sitting hours are seasonal, and may be extended due to certain circumstances, but are generally 14:00 to 18:00 Tuesday and Wednesday, 14:00 to 17:00 Thursday, and 19:00 to 22:00 Tuesday and Wednesday. AM Network Parliamentary coverage is also streamed online, with podcasts and transcripts available.

The House is broadcast on RNZ on the House sitting days at 6:55 pm and Sunday at 7:30 am and 10:45 pm. It looks at legislation, issues, and insights from Parliament.

To help fund the operation of the station, RNZ has leased the remaining hours to Christian broadcaster Rhema Media since 1997, which uses the frequencies to broadcast the low-budget easy listening Star network. The transmitters were previously used by the Concert Programme before it moved to FM broadcasting.

=== RNZ Pacific ===
The RNZ Pacific network (also known outside New Zealand as RNZ International, or RNZI) broadcasts on shortwave and via Digital Radio Mondiale to New Zealand's neighbouring countries in the Pacific from transmitters located at Rangitaiki, near Taupō, in the North Island. There also is a relay via WRN Broadcast and a livestream on the internet.

=== RNZ podcasts and series ===
RNZ has a wide variety of podcasts and series. Series can be downloaded in Oggcast format.

== RNZ News ==
RNZ's main news centres are located in Wellington and Auckland, with additional reporters based in Whangārei, Hamilton, New Plymouth, Napier and Hawkes Bay, Palmerston North, Nelson, Christchurch, and Dunedin. There is also a Parliamentary Press Gallery office situated in Parliament.

In addition to hourly news bulletins, RNZ's news service provides 24-hour programming and news and current affairs with programmes such as Morning Report with Ingrid Hipkiss and John Campbell, Nine to Noon with Kathryn Ryan, and Checkpoint with Lisa Owen. The organisation also operates rnz.co.nz and the RNZ app with stories which are syndicated by other news publishers.

Before 1996, the organisation's news service provided news to all commercial stations operated by Radio New Zealand, as well as many independently owned stations. New owner, The Radio Network, launched its own news service.

=== Correspondents ===
- Politics – Jo Moir / Craig McCulloch / Anneke Smith / Katie Scotcher / Giles Dexter
- Business – Gyles Beckford / Nona Pelletier / Anan Zaki
- Health – Rowan Quinn
- Education – John Gerritsen
- Te Manu Korihi – Taiha Molyneux / Tu Natanahira / Pokere Paewai

Regional Reporters:

- Northland – Peter de Graaf
- Waikato – Natalie Akoorie / Libby Kirkby-McLeod
- Hawke's Bay – Tom Kitchin
- Taranaki/Whanganui – Robin Martin
- Manawatu – Jimmy Ellingham
- Nelson – Samantha Gee
- Otago – Timothy Brown / Tess Brunton

== Websites ==
The RNZ website, rnz.co.nz (formerly radionz.co.nz), was launched in October 2005, and includes news coverage, programme information, online station streaming, and podcasting. RNZ National, RNZ Concert, AM Network coverage of Parliament, and RNZ Pacific are available as Windows Media Audio streams. Almost all RNZ-produced programmes are available dating back to January 2008, and have MP3 and Ogg Vorbis and download and podcasts options. Some material is not available due to insufficient copyright clearances.

The website was awarded the Qantas Media Award for Best Website Design in 2007, a New Zealand Open Source Award in 2008, New Zealand Radio Award for Best Radio Website in 2009, and ONYA awards for Best use of HTML and CSS and Best Accessibility in 2010. The site was re-launched on 26 May 2013 with a new design and a custom CMS built using the open source Ruby on Rails framework.

The website was further redesigned and relaunched in July 2016, and the domain was moved to rnz.co.nz in May 2019.

In July 2023, two news portals were opened for Chinese and Indian New Zealander community audiences, with the Chinese section featuring stories in Simplified Chinese.

=== The Wireless ===
Logo of The Wireless when it was launched in 2013.

In October 2013, Radio New Zealand launched the youth-focused and non-commercial website 'The Wireless.' The website emerged from the push for a youth radio station as part of Radio New Zealand's offerings. Instead of creating a youth radio station, RNZ decided to create a website or online magazine that focused on 18- to 30-year-olds, which would be more relevant to the demographic.

Project manager Marcus Stickley noted that: "RNZ has had the wisdom to recognize that it didn't necessarily need to be under the RNZ brand. It needed to develop something specifically for that audience, and they've given us the freedom to go away and figure out exactly how to do that." In April 2014, the CEO of RNZ commented that The Wireless was "the most exciting innovation from RNZ in recent years."

The Wireless ceased operating as an independent publication in 2018, and was folded back into RNZ.

=== Tahi ===
Tahi, a youth-oriented platform, was launched in December 2021 and closed down in late 2025.

== Former commercial stations ==
Prior to 1996, Radio New Zealand operated a large number of commercial stations around New Zealand. These stations were typically local stations with their own local identity, with the origins of many stations going back to the 1930s up until more recent stations created in the 1990s. Stations in the larger centres were usually local 24 hours a day, and stations in the smaller centres featured a mixture of part-local and part-networked programming.

In 1996, the New Zealand Government sold off all of their commercial stations to a syndicate that included United States radio company Clear Channel Communications and publisher Wilson & Horton; in New Zealand, the new owner became known as The Radio Network.

The following stations were previously owned by Radio New Zealand. Some listed stations were closed down before the 1996 sale, while Gore radio station Radio Hokonui was sold privately in 1994.

=== Heritage Classic Hits and Newstalk ZB stations ===
All of the early local radio stations started by Radio New Zealand originally broadcast on an AM frequency. FM broadcasting did not begin in New Zealand until the 1980s. In the 1980s and early 1990s, most stations listed below switched to an FM frequency, but continued to broadcast on the original AM frequency. Some stations utilised the AM frequency for specialised shows, such as local talkback, sports talk, and local news shows. In 1993, the majority of these stations were split in two, with the AM frequency used to broadcast Auckland based Newstalk ZB, which was originally Auckland's 1ZB. The local station on the FM frequency adopted a common format and brand called Classic Hits, with all stations retaining local programming under Radio New Zealand's operation.

- Radio Northland – Whangārei
- Newstalk 1ZB – Auckland (first Newstalk ZB station, adopted talk format in 1987)
- Classic Hits 97FM – Auckland (first Classic Hits station and originally 1ZM)
- ZHFM – Waikato
- 95 BOP FM – Tauranga
- Geyserland FM – Rotorua
- Bay City Radio – Hawkes Bay
- Radio Taranaki – Taranaki
- 2ZA – Palmerston North
- 2ZB and B90FM – Wellington (2ZB became Newstalk ZB, B90FM became Classic Hits B90)
- Radio Nelson – Nelson
- 3ZB and B98FM – Christchurch (3ZB became Newstalk ZB, B90FM became Classic Hits B98)
- Radio Caroline – Timaru
- ZBFM – Dunedin
- 4ZA – Southland

=== Community stations ===
Radio New Zealand community stations operated in the heartland areas of New Zealand. These stations typically ran limited local programming, such as a local breakfast show, and at other times relayed a nearby station or National Radio. Following the sale to The Radio Network, most of these stations became part of the Community Radio Network, with programming outside the breakfast show originating from Taupō. These stations later became part of the Classic Hits network in 2001.

- Radio Forestland – Tokoroa
- King Country Radio – Taumarunui
- Radio Waitomo – Te Kūiti
- Lakeland FM – Taupō
- ZGFM – Gisborne
- River City FM – Whanganui
- Wairarapa FM – Wairarapa
- Radio Marlborough – Marlborough
- Scenicland FM – West Coast
- 3ZE – Ashburton
- Radio Waitaki – Oamaru
- 4ZG Radio Hokonui – Gore (sold in 1994 to independent owner)

=== ZM stations ===
Radio New Zealand operated a youth network of stations under the ZM brand, with the three original stations being in Auckland, Wellington, and Christchurch. The Auckland station, 1ZM, changed format in 1987 to Classic Hits, leaving just the Wellington and Christchurch stations. Since the sale to The Radio Network, ZM has been expanded to a nationwide network based in Auckland.

- 93ZM Whangārei
- 91ZM Wellington
- 91ZM Christchurch

=== Sports Roundup ===
Sports Roundup was a network which conducted seasonal sports broadcasts in the main centres during the 1980s and 1990s, particularly used to broadcast Cricket matches in New Zealand. Following the sale to The Radio Network, Sports Roundup became known as Radio Sport, which went off the air permanently in 2020.

=== Other stations ===
- 89X – Auckland (purchased by Radio New Zealand in 1992, closed down 1993)
- Rock 99 – Rotorua (closed down 1996)
- Classic Rock 96FM – Hawkes Bay (replaced with ZM)
- Classic Rock Q91FM – Palmerston North (formerly known as 2QQ, later replaced with ZM)

== Controversies ==
=== Proposed RNZ Concert closure ===
In February 2020, it was announced by Music Content Director Willy Macalister and Chief Executive Paul Thompson that RNZ Concert was to undergo major changes: it would be moved from the FM to the AM band, streamed online, and the current service replaced by an automated non-stop play format. Seventeen jobs would be lost from RNZ Music, including all the Concert presenters. It would be replaced on FM radio with music for a younger audience as part of a new multimedia music brand.

The move was widely condemned across New Zealand, with many people seeing it as a gutting of the arts in New Zealand. Former Prime Minister Helen Clark issued a statement on Twitter saying that it "equates to a dumbing down of cultural life in NZ." Two thousand protesters signed a petition. The RNZ board reversed its decision when the government announced it would grant RNZ a third FM channel.

=== Inappropriate editing of articles about international affairs ===
On 9 June 2023, Radio New Zealand launched an investigation after discovering several stories that it said gave a false account of the Russian invasion of Ukraine. Wire agency articles were said to have been "edited to align with the Russian view of events." The editing was linked to one employee, journalist Michael Hall, who subsequently resigned. An RNZ audit identified 49 examples of what it called inappropriate editing on various international affairs. Nearly half of the affected content related to the war in Ukraine, while others related to China, Israel, and countries in Europe and South America. A Stuff reporter interpreted the edits to be broadly from a tankie point of view, in which aggression from authoritarian governments with a communist past are supported or downplayed, usually as part of opposition to the United States and its allies.

In early August 2023, the independent review found that Hall had breached both Radio New Zealand's editorial standards and the company's contract with Reuters. The review also criticised RNZ's management for overreacting to coverage of Hall's actions, and found that internal cultural, system, and teamwork issues contributed to Hall's inappropriate edits. The review's panel recommended that RNZ merge its digital news team with its main news team, and appoint someone to focus on improving the organisation's editorial standards. The RNZ board chairperson, Jim Mather, stated that RNZ accepted the report, and would implement its recommendations.
