= Radio Caroline (New Zealand) =

Timaru; New Zealand
- Broadcast area: South Canterbury
- Frequency: 94.7 MHz

Programming
- Language: English language
- Format: Adult contemporary

Ownership
- Owner: Radio New Zealand (until 1996); The Radio Network after 1996

History
- First air date: 1949; 77 years ago

Technical information
- Transmitter coordinates: 44.4003971°S 171.2486191°E

Links
- Website: Official website

Radio Caroline was a radio station in Timaru, New Zealand.

The station began as a government-owned community based radio station in on 18 January 1949 with the original call sign of 3XC broadcasting on 1160AM. Radio Caroline also broadcast in Twizel originally on 1550AM; the Twizel station ran a hybrid of Radio Caroline and National Radio programming.

In 1978 Radio Caroline moved to 1152AM in Timaru and 1485AM in Twizel, the change in frequency was due to the New Zealand AM band changing from 10 kHz frequency spacing to 9 kHz spacing. Coinciding with the change in frequency the station call sign was changed to 3ZC.

== Rebranding as Classic 99FM ==
From 1993 onwards Radio New Zealand consolidated most of their local adult contemporary stations into the Classic Hits brand. In 1995 Radio Caroline began broadcasting on 98.7FM in addition to the AM frequency and became part of the Classic Hits FM network as Classic Hits 99FM. The station initially retained local programming between 6 am - 7 pm.

== Change of ownership and exit from Classic Hits network ==
In July 1996 the New Zealand Government sold off the commercial arm of Radio New Zealand, which included, among other things, the Classic Hits branded stations. The new owner was The Radio Network, a subsidiary of APN News & Media and Clear Channel Communications, which operated as a division of the Australian Radio Network.

As part of cost-cutting measures The Radio Network began reducing local content on all Classic Hits stations, limiting local programming to a local breakfast show. Stations in smaller regions were also consolidated together to form a network called the Community Radio Network. Community Radio Network stations retained their local identity and continued to run a local breakfast show between 6 am and 10 am and outside these times took a network show from studios in Taupo. As a result of these changes the Timaru station was removed from the Classic Hits network and now rebranded as South Canterbury's 99FM. This is the only known station to be removed from the Classic Hits network.

== Return to Classic Hits network ==
In 2001 the Community Radio Network was discontinued with all stations in this group joined to the Classic Hits network as a result South Canterbury's 99FM became Classic Hits 98.7. The stations breakfast show remained local and outside breakfast all programming came from Classic Hits studios in Auckland. The same year the original AM frequency was reassigned to Newstalk ZB.

In 2005 the station began broadcasting on 94.7FM in addition to the 98.7FM frequency.

== Rebranding as The Hits ==
On April 28, 2014 all stations part of the Classic Hits network were rebranded as The Hits. A networked breakfast presented by Polly Gillespie and Grant Kareama was introduced to almost all The Hits stations with the former breakfast announcer moved to present a 6-hour show between 9 am and 3 pm. The local 9 am-3 pm show was originally presented by Sam Wilson but later in 2014 The Hits Waitaki announcer Josh McIntyre took over this show broadcasting to both Timaru. With Polly and Grant leaving The Hits in 2017 all South Island stations reverted to local breakfast programming with Josh McIntyre moving to this time slot followed by network programming from 9 am.

== Other Radio Caroline ==
A small station using the name Radio Caroline now broadcasts from Palmerston, Otago on 756AM; coverage includes Dunedin.
