= Radio Caroline (disambiguation) =

Radio Caroline is a British radio station founded in 1964 by Ronan O'Rahilly.

It may also refer to:

- Radio Caroline (Netherlands), a Dutch station styled after Radio Caroline, and later changed its name to Radio Waddenzee
- Radio Caroline (New Zealand), an earlier radio station in Timaru, New Zealand
- Radio Caroline International, name adopted of the earlier Radio North Sea International
- Radio Caroline Volume 1, the second DJ mix album by Miss Kittin
