= House Hunt =

- Genre: Reality television
- Country of origin: New Zealand

Original release
- Network: TV One

House Hunt is a New Zealand reality television series about the New Zealand property market, which follows house-hunters looking to buy property. It airs on TV One.

Series director Robyn Paterson spoke on the Breakfast with Brian Kelly program on the Coast radio network in June 2015, just before the series aired. When asked how they found their house hunters, she said, "We literally hit the streets. We wanted to find people who were genuinely on that journey. We went to open homes, we contacted real estate agents, we contacted mortgage brokers. We were just seeing who was out there looking for a house at the time."
