= 4ZA =

Invercargill; New Zealand
- Broadcast area: Southland
- Frequencies: 98.8 MHz; 90.4 MHz Te Anau; 864 KHz (until 1994)

Programming
- Language: English
- Format: Adult contemporary

Ownership
- Owner: Radio New Zealand until 1996; The Radio Network after 1996

History
- First air date: 1956; 70 years ago

Technical information
- Transmitter coordinates: 46.4105°S 168.3540°E

Links
- Webcast: Livestream
- Website: Official website

4ZA (now known as The Hits Southland 98.8) was an adult contemporary radio station in Southland, New Zealand.

== Early years ==
4ZA began broadcasting in Southland on 820 AM in 1956 as a commercial station operated by the Radio New Zealand (which at the time was known as the National Broadcasting Service). With the change in band frequency spacing in late 1978, 4ZA moved to 864 AM. Before 1989 radio stations in New Zealand were assigned call signs; 4ZA was branded as its call sign name 4ZA until 1993, when it became Classic Hits ZAFM.

In 1979 John "Boggy" Mcdowall joined the station and took on the role as the breakfast show host. Despite all the changes made to the station, Boggy remained the station's breakfast host until the end of 2012. For a time Boggy was also the station's Programme Director.

== Switch to FM ==
In 1991 when it began broadcasting on 98.8 FM, 4ZA was the first commercial station in Southland to broadcast on FM. Years later 4ZA also switched to FM in Te Anau, broadcasting on 90.4FM. Between 1991 and 1993 4ZA ran a country music show on the AM frequency on Sunday mornings and a Classic Hits show at the same time on the FM frequency; the same was done weekday mornings where Talkback would run on the AM frequency. It was at this time that announcers started calling the station Classic Hits 4ZA-FM. From 7 pm to 6 am the station carried RNZ Community Network programming in simulated stereo.

== Rebranding as Classic Hits ZAFM ==
In 1993 Radio New Zealand rebranded many of their heritage stations as Classic Hits, but some of the stations maintained part of the heritage name into the branding. For 4ZA the station became known as Classic Hits ZAFM. For most locals the change was seamless, as if the announcers had simply started calling the station ZA-FM instead of 4ZA-FM. The 7pm to 6am show was replaced with a stereo feed from Auckland branded Classic Hits, originally with Auckland advertising.

In the early nineties Radio New Zealand began rolling Newstalk ZB out across the country. In 1994 the 864AM frequency originally used for 4ZA was reassigned to Newstalk ZB with some local news content on the Newstalk ZB station read out by a Classic Hits ZAFM newsreader.

The station branding under the Classic Hits brand changed slightly from Classic Hits ZAFM to Classic Hits 98.8 ZAFM in 2001 and Classic Hits 98.8 in 2005.

== Change of ownership and reduction in local programming ==
In July 1996 the New Zealand Government sold off the commercial arm of Radio New Zealand, which included, among other things, the Classic Hits branded stations. The new owner was The Radio Network, a subsidiary of APN News & Media and Clear Channel Communications, which operated as a division of the Australian Radio Network.

In 1998 Classic Hits ZAFM was reduced to just 4 hours of local programming between 6 and 10 am 7 days a week. Outside this time nationwide shows based from Auckland took over, and the announcers simply called the station Classic Hits. Competitions also became nationwide competitions, for example the Rices Southland of Southland (sponsored by a local and now defunct appliance store) was replaced with The Secret Sound. Listeners also were required to call a nationwide 0800 number when entering competitions even during the local breakfast show. The breakfast show was shortened to a 3-hour show in 2012 on all Classic Hits stations and local weekend programming removed.

2006 marked the 50th anniversary of 4ZA and Classic Hits ZAFM. In October a reunion was held for all employees that ever worked on this station.

== Rebranding as The Hits ==
On 28 April 2014 all stations part of the Classic Hits network were rebranded as The Hits. A networked breakfast presented by Polly Gillespie and Grant Kareama was introduced to almost all The Hits stations with the former breakfast announcer moved to present a 6-hour show between 9am and 3pm. Southland however retained its local breakfast show and continued to run network programming after 9 am. Today The Hits Southland runs a networked breakfast show and local programming between 9am and 3pm.

== Programming ==
=== Breakfast ===
From 1 June 1979 until 21 December 2012 the breakfast show on 4ZA and later Classic Hits was presented by John "Boggy" McDowell. Despite a lot of changes on the station, from a change in branding, ownership of the station and reduction of local content, the breakfast show remained much unchanged.

"Bertie Budgies" birthday calls are believed to have been part of the breakfast show since the 1960s. Bertie Budgie had his origins in the 1960s as a budgie in a cage at the station's reception. Later Bertie Budgie became the station's mascot appearing at local events in costume form. The intro jingle to Bertie Budgies birthday calls remained in place until 2009, when it was replaced with the same birthday calls intro used on other Classic Hits stations. In 2011 this was reduced to Boggy just reading out the birthdays. "Wooly Woofter Awards" on Wednesdays were also a part of the breakfast show from the 1980s. The award was given to a person who had done a rather embarrassing act and was usually nominated by a friend, family member or colleague.

Another long serving member of the breakfast crew was newsreader Malcolm Gayfer, who read out a local news bulletin for Southland during the breakfast show followed by the national and international sports news, adding in any local Southland sports news. The same news bulletin was also read out on Southland's Newstalk ZB. Malcolm Gayfer read out his final bulletin on the same day Boggy left the station. For a time Malcolm Gayfer was Boggy's breakfast co-host.

On 2 April 2012 it was announced that breakfast show presenter John "Boggy" McDowell would move to Coast, presenting the afternoon show to a nationwide audience. At the same time an announcement was made that Boggy's then co-host Tracy Kilkelly would move to an administrative role within The Radio Network, effective 5 April 2012, and James McRobie would take over as Boggy's co-host for the remainder of 2012 before moving to the role of the show's main presenter in 2013.

== Studio location ==
The 4ZA studios were located on the corner of Don and Deveron Streets in the Invercargill CDB, in a two-story building with a courtyard in the middle. During the station's heyday the entire building was occupied by 4ZA, with the studios on the first floor. With the reduction of local programming, many of the offices in the building became empty. In the 2000s the ground floor of the building was occupied by the Southern Institute of Technology, known as the SIT Sound campus or ZA Campus. SIT uses this campus for music and radio-related courses. The top floor continued to house the studios for Classic Hits ZAFM and also used to host programming for Hokonui and Newstalk ZB with announcer Marcus Lush presenting the nationwide night show on Newstalk ZB from Invercargill. In 2024 NZME relocated their Invercargill studios to a smaller building at 111 Spey Street in Invercargill.
