= 4ZB =

Dunedin; New Zealand
- Broadcast area: Dunedin
- Frequencies: 89.4 MHz; 1044 KHz

Programming
- Language: English language
- Format: Adult contemporary

Ownership
- Owner: Radio New Zealand until 1996; The Radio Network after 1996

History
- First air date: 1937; 89 years ago

Technical information
- Transmitter coordinates: 45.8726558°S 170.504569°E

4ZB was an adult contemporary radio station in Dunedin, New Zealand.

== History ==
=== Early years ===
The station was started by the New Zealand Broadcasting Service in 1937 originally broadcasting on 1040AM. The station was branded from the stations callsign 4ZB. ZB stations were assigned to the four main regions in New Zealand, Auckland, Wellington, Christchurch and Dunedin. While content was local some network shows were heard such as Aunt Daisy up until 1963. In 1978 the station moved to 1044AM after New Zealand changed from 10 kHz spacing on the AM band to 9 kHz spacing. From the 1970s programming was extended into Central Otago on 640AM (callsign 4YW) and Queenstown (callsign 4YQ) on 1120AM, these stations moved to 639AM and 1134AM, respectively, in 1978. The Queenstown and Central Otago stations ran a mixture of National Radio and 4ZB programming. Both Queenstown and Central Otago frequencies were later used to solely broadcast RNZ National, however they were both switched off in April 2019.

=== Switch to FM ===
In September 1990 4ZB switched to FM, broadcasting on 89.4FM and became known as ZBFM. 4ZB continued to use the AM frequency and launched a parallel station called 4ZB The Talk of Dunedin. Both stations ran the same breakfast show but following the breakfast show programming on the AM frequency had a talkback focus including community news and easy listening music.

=== Rebranding as Classic Hits 89FM ===
In 1993 Radio New Zealand rebranded many of their heritage stations as Classic Hits. For 4ZB the station became known as Classic Hits 89FM.

In the early nineties Radio New Zealand began rolling Newstalk ZB out across the country. In 1993 the 1044AM frequency used for 4ZB The Talk of Dunedin became Newstalk ZB with some local news and talkback retained.

The station branding under the Classic Hits brand changed slightly from Classic Hits 89FM to Classic Hits 89.4 in 2001.

=== Change of ownership and reduction in local programming ===
In July 1996 the New Zealand Government sold off the commercial arm of Radio New Zealand, which included, among other things, the Classic Hits branded stations. The new owner was The Radio Network, a subsidiary of APN News & Media and Clear Channel Communications, which operated as a division of the Australian Radio Network.

In 1998 Classic Hits 89FM was reduced to just 4 hours of local programming between 6 and 10 am 7 days a week. Outside this time nationwide shows based from Auckland took over, and the network announcers simply called the station Classic Hits. The breakfast show was shortened to a 3-hour show in 2012 on all Classic Hits stations and local weekend programming removed.

=== Rebranding as The Hits ===
On 28 April 2014, all stations part of the Classic Hits network were rebranded as The Hits. A networked breakfast presented by Polly Gillespie and Grant Kareama was introduced to almost all The Hits stations with the former breakfast announcer moved to present a 6-hour show between 9am and 3pm. Dunedin however retained its local breakfast show presented by Callum Procter and Patrina Roche. and continues to run network programming after 9 am.
