= 1ZH =

- Hamilton; New Zealand
- Broadcast area: Waikato
- Frequency: 98.6 MHz

Programming
- Language: English
- Format: Adult contemporary

Ownership
- Owner: Radio New Zealand until 1996; The Radio Network after 1996

History
- First air date: 1949
- Former names: 1XH (1949–1968); 1ZH (1968–1990); ZHFM (1990–1993); Classic Hits ZHFM (1993–1998); Classic Hits (1998–2014)
- Former frequencies: 1310 kHz (1949–1978); 1296 kHz (1978–1990)

Technical information
- Transmitter coordinates: 37.7856°S 175.2828°E

1ZH was a New Zealand radio station based in Hamilton, New Zealand.

The station was originally known as 1XH which was the station's original callsign. 1XH was started by the New Zealand Broadcasting Service [predecessor of the New Zealand Broadcasting Corporation, and later to be Radio New Zealand] in 1949, broadcasting on 1310 AM. In 1968 the station callsign was changed to 1ZH [under the NZBC] and the station was known on air by this name.

In 1978, after AM band in New Zealand was changed from 10 kHz spacing to 9 kHz spacing, as a result 1ZH was moved to 1296AM. On air names included 1300 1ZH and Hits and Memories 1ZH during the 1980s.

On 25 May 1990 1ZH switched to FM broadcasting on 98.6FM at this time the station became known as ZHFM. A television advertisement for the switch to FM used the song Time Warp from The Rocky Horror Show with the line "Let's switch ZHFM" instead of "Let's do the Time Warp again." A similar advertisement was used for 4ZB Dunedin when this station switched to FM in September 1990, with the line "Let's switch ZBFM." The 98.6 ZHFM frequency can also be heard in Tauranga, the outskirts of Auckland and in a number of places in Northland due to its high power and the high elevation of its transmission site.

In 1993 Radio New Zealand rebranded many of their heritage stations as Classic Hits. For ZHFM the station became known as Classic Hits ZHFM. At the same time Radio New Zealand began rolling out Newstalk ZB across the country. The original 1296AM frequency was replaced with Newstalk ZB.

In July 1996 the New Zealand Government sold off the commercial arm of Radio New Zealand, which included, among other things, the Classic Hits branded stations. The new owner was The Radio Network, a subsidiary of APN News & Media and Clear Channel Communications, which operated as a division of the Australian Radio Network.

The original studios were located in the basement of the then Hamilton City Council headquarters in Alma Street. The whole building became Broadcasting House once the City moved its HQ to the back of Garden Place in mid-1960. The basement later housed The Rock 93FM when this station launched in Hamilton in 1991. In 1996 Classic Hits ZHFM moved to its current location on Hardley street.

In 1998 Classic Hits ZHFM was reduced to just 4 hours of local programming between 6 and 10 am 7 days a week. Outside this time nationwide shows based from Auckland took over, and the network announcers simply called the station Classic Hits. The breakfast show was shortened to a 3-hour show in 2012 on all Classic Hits.

On 28 April 2014, all stations part of the Classic Hits network were rebranded as The Hits. A networked breakfast presented by Polly Gillespie and Grant Kareama was introduced to almost all The Hits stations, with the former breakfast announcer moved to present a 6-hour show between 9 am and 3 pm. Waikato originally kept its local breakfast presented by Mark Bunting. However, just prior to the rebranding Bunting had tendered his resignation with The Radio Network and accepted a position on rival station The Breeze Waikato. A week after rebranding Mark Bunting left the station and Sunday night network announcer Blair Dowling became the new Waikato local announcer. However, he presented the daytime 9 am – 3 pm show instead and Waikato began taking the network breakfast.
