= Community Radio Network (New Zealand) =

Former radio network in New Zealand

The Community Radio Network (CRN) was a network of radio stations based in provincial centres across New Zealand. The network was operated by The Radio Network (TRN).

The Community Radio Network (CRN) was a distinctive collection of 13 provincial radio stations operating throughout New Zealand, from Te Kuiti in the north, to Oamaru in the south, under the management of The Radio Network (TRN). Established in 1998, the network introduced a hybrid broadcasting model that allowed each station to retain its local identity while benefiting from a centralised programming structure. Local breakfast shows continued to originate from each station’s home region, preserving the familiar voices and community connection listeners valued. After breakfast, stations switched to a network feed broadcast from Taupō, which carried programming through the day and overnight.

Before CRN’s launch, many of the participating stations were still running fully manual operations, relying on records, CDs, and cartridges. The introduction of the network prompted a complete digital transformation, with new computer systems installed and all audio material digitised.

The network on-air line up originally included:

- Mark Bramley (10a – 2p)
- Aaron Gillions (2p – 7p)
- Peter Gosney (7p – 12a)

In late 1998, the lineup would change to:

- Mark Bramley (10a – 2p)
- Scott Armstrong (2p – 7p) (Brian Gentil in 2000)
- Peter Gosney (7p – 12a) (Duncan Allen in 2000)

Across the network, listeners also heard a range of other presenters including Geoff Bargas, Rebecca Ali, Nadine Christiansen, Sarah McMullan, Chris Auer, Marke Dickson, and Paul Frost. Most shifts were broadcast live, with the exception of the overnight hours and certain weekend periods.

The network’s programming was originally overseen by Aaron Gillions, with Paul Frost later stepping into the role.The Network Manager was Brian Jennings.

One of the network’s most memorable programmes was the Saturday Night Party Vault, a show broadcast live each Saturday evening. Initially running from 7pm until midnight and later extended to 1am, the programme blended 70s disco, 80s pop, and contemporary dance hits. Hosted by Mark Bramley - who also served as the show’s music director - the Party Vault embraced a loose, playful format that welcomed requests, giveaways, and a sense of carefree fun. Bramley later reflected that the show’s deliberately free form, “pick and mix” style was part of its charm, and audiences embraced its upbeat, unpretentious spirit.

Technically, the network was originally powered by Wavestation, a simple but effective automation system that served its purpose well in the early days. In late 1999, the network upgraded to Simian, a more advanced system that offered smoother handling of automated tasks. The network feed itself originated from Studio 1 - the main Lakeland FM studio in Taupō - while most recorded shifts were produced in Studio 2, which also functioned as the production voice booth. Studio 3 was occasionally used for recording network content or producing material for Lakeland FM.

The CRN era came to a close on 1 December 2000, when the stations transitioned to the Classic Hits network broadcast from Cook Street in Auckland, also operated by TRN. In markets with both AM and FM frequencies, the FM signal typically carried the localised Classic Hits feed, while the AM frequency was used to broadcast Newstalk ZB. Although the on air network ceased, the CRN division continued within TRN, providing creative services - including commercial writing and production - for stations across the country.

CRN was later renamed to 'The Provincial Group'.

== Members ==
- Te Kuiti – 1ZW / Radio Waitomo (Sold in 2004, ceased broadcasting in 2005)
- Tokoroa – Radio Forestland
- Taumarunui – King Country Radio (Ceased broadcasting in 2010)
- Taupō – Lakeland FM
- Gisborne – 2ZG / 90.9 ZGFM
- Masterton – Radio Wairarapa / 90.1 Wairarapa FM
- Whanganui – River City FM
- Blenheim – Radio Marlborough
- West Coast – Scenicland FM
- Ashburton – 3ZE / ZEFM
- Timaru – South Canterbury's 99FM
- Oamaru – Radio Waitaki
