= Hokonui (radio station) =

Radio station in Gore, New Zealand

New Zealand
- Broadcast area: Southland/Mid-Canterbury/South Taranaki
- Frequencies: 94.8 FM Southland, 91.3 FM & 88.3 FM South Otago, West Otago 95.2 FM, 92.5 & 96.5 FM Ashburton, 1485 AM Twizel, 88.2FM & 1557 AM Hāwera

Programming
- Format: Adult Contemporary

Ownership
- Owner: Radio New Zealand until 1994; Independently owned 1994 - 2004; Since 2004 - Independent but operated by NZME

History
- First air date: 1994; 32 years ago
- Former call signs: 4ZG
- Call sign meaning: 4ZG

Technical information
- Transmitter coordinates: 46.094°S 168.7114°E

Hokonui (previously known as Hokonui Gold) is an adult contemporary radio station that first launched in Gore, New Zealand, broadcasting across Southland and now also broadcasts across South Otago and Mid Canterbury. Hokonui also from April 2015 was broadcasting in Taranaki until late in 2020 when it was disestablished by NZME and replaced by Gold AM. The name Hokonui comes from the Hokonui Hills which can clearly be seen in Gore and the Southland Plains.

== History ==
The original station in Gore was formerly known as 4ZG or Radio Hokonui, which broadcast on 558 AM and was operated by Radio New Zealand. 4ZG was first started in 1981 and the station was used in the evenings to broadcast the Concert Programme until 1990 when Concert FM began broadcasting on its own frequency in Southland. Overnight during the 1980s the station carried the ZM All Nighter from the 1ZM studios in Auckland. In 1992 4ZG was reduced to just 4 hours a day of programming and outside this time a simulcast of 4ZA was played. In the eyes of many, this change seemed the station was dying of a slow and painful death so as a result, two locals purchased the station. In 1994 4ZG became Hokonui Gold and reverted to being live and local.

In 1996 Hokonui Gold made the move to FM when it began broadcasting on 92.4 (Forest Hill) and 94.8 (High Peak) but with a lack of FM Stereo sound found on most FM Stations. The 558 AM frequency was taken over by The Radio Network and was first used as a second frequency for Classic Hits ZAFM but later this frequency was used for Radio Sport. Over the years Hokonui Gold continued to operate independently and competed well against many new network stations that arrived in Southland during the late 1990s. Hokonui Gold pride itself on being a local station and once published advertisements stating We believe Auckland radio should stay in Auckland and Our bosses don't live in Canada or Ireland, emphasizing the fact the station is locally owned and operated.

In 2004 the station was leased back to The Radio Network, the successor to Radio New Zealand's commercial operations. Despite this change, Hokonui Gold still remained live and local but now used Newstalk ZB news service and The Radio Network advertising. One of the most popular shows on Hokonui Gold at the time was The Farming Show and this show is now played on Newstalk ZB in all markets across New Zealand except Auckland and on RadioSport nationwide, re-branded as "The Country". The show is now originated from the Radio Network studios (now NZME) in Dunedin since Jamie McKay moved from Gore to live in Dunedin. In 2005 both frequencies were moved to Hedgehope and the 92.4 FM frequency reassigned to Coast. In 2006 spot coverage to West Otago was established on 95.2 FM High Peak. FM Stereo broadcasting was introduced after 2009.

The original Gore station continues to produce a local weekday breakfast show, which also plays on Hokonui Balclutha, and an hour-long local rural show. A Hokonui station in Ashburton also produces a local breakfast show.

In February 2022 NZME purchased Wanaka radio station Radio Wanaka. While Radio Wanaka retains its own identity the station runs the same playlist as Hokonui and the Hokonui afternoon announcers provide voice breaks for Radio Wanaka in addition to Hokonui. In the case of the weekday afternoon show Peter Mac produces a local voice for Hokonui Ashburton, Southland and Radio Wanaka.

== Hokonui Lineup ==
The Best of The Muster: 5-6 AM with Andy Muir

Southland & South Otago Breakfast: 6-10 AM with Kirstin "Chitty" Chittock.

Ashburton Breakfast: 6-10 AM with Luke Howden

Mornings: 10AM-Midday "The 70s, 80s and 90s Mix 'til Midday"

The Country: 12-1 PM with Jamie MacKay (presented from NZME's Dunedin studios)

The Muster: 1-2 PM with Andy Muir (presented from NZME's Gore studios for Southland stations only)

Afternoons: 1-6 PM (except Southland stations) / 2-6 PM (Southland stations only) with Peter Mac (presented from NZME's Ashburton studios)

Southland and South Otago Saturday Mornings are presented by Patrina Roche. Mid Canterbury Saturday Mornings are hosted by Phill (Hoops) Hooper. Saturday afternoons are hosted by Craig "Wal" Waddell, who also hosts Saturday Sports Scoreboard. Sundays are hosted by Scott Armstrong and Liam Simpson. All other times the station plays non-stop music. The station has news on the hour 24/7 and weather and marine forecasts for all stations provided by Newstalk ZB.

=== The Country ===
The Country (previously The Farming Show) with Jamie Mackay airs from midday to 1 pm weekdays and is presented and produced in Dunedin. The Country can be also heard on Newstalk ZB in all markets except Auckland and on Gold AM. The show was first started in 1994 coinciding with the launch of Hokonui Gold and was originally a 20-minute weekday show called "Farming Today." While the show could previously be heard online as well as on Hokonui Gold, programming was extended to selected Newstalk ZB and Radio Sport stations in 2004. The show was originally produced from the Hokonui Gold Gore studios but was moved to Dunedin in 2009 after Jamie Mackay relocated to Dunedin. A second Southland-focused rural programme, the Muster, presented by Andy Thompson, can be heard exclusively on Hokonui's Southland and South Otago stations.

In 2009, the Broadcasting Standards Authority rejected a complaint about a discussion of vegetarianism advocate Lord Johan Steyn in which MacKay called the Lord a "pommy git". The authority ruled the term pommy was "unlikely to offend, insult or intimidate" and the expression pommy git was not derogatory. Australian cricketer Peter Gardiner was found guilty of racism by the Western Australian Cricket Association for using the same term four years earlier, but the Australian Human Rights and Equal Opportunity Commission no longer considered the term offensive. The decision sparked a public discussion about profanity and racial terminology.

In 2013, the authority upheld a complaint against MacKay for naming a Queenstown bar, and criticising both the venue and its staff. It found McKay and his companions been refused service at a Queenstown bar due to "intoxication and aggressive behaviour", and McKay had then gone to make on-air comments which were unfair, vengeful and personally motivated. The National Business Review compared the case to that of National Party MP Aaron Gilmore, who resigned over controversial comments he made to a Hanmer Springs waiter. However, McKay said he had a different understanding of events. He made a formal apology to the business, and was not penalised for his comments.

== Stations ==
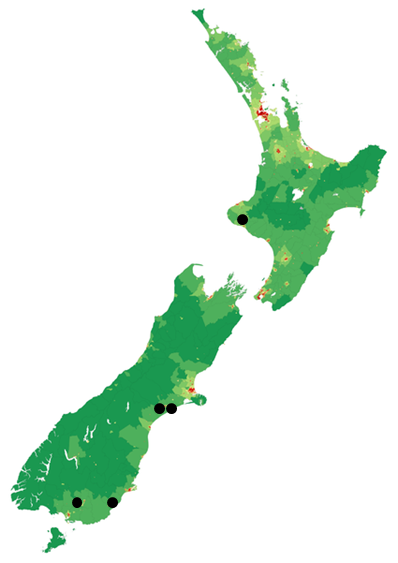
This is a map of Hokonui stations operating in 2017.

=== Southland ===
The Southland Hokonui station is the original station, based on the Main Street of Gore. The majority of the programming on the station previously originated from this studio however in more recent years some announcing originates from the NZME studios in Invercargill, Dunedin, Christchurch, Wellington and Ashburton.

In May 2012 Hokonui Gold simply became Hokonui. This was part of a rebrand exercise which included new station imaging, logo along with a shift to a contemporary country music format. The format change was not well received by many listeners and by July the format was reverted to an adult contemporary format. Hokonui Southland can also be listened to online 24/7 on iHeart Radio.

=== South Otago ===
As part of the changes Hokonui Gold's sister station Radio Clutha was also rebranded to Hokonui 91.3 but retained its breakfast show. Radio Clutha itself used to receive its programming outside of breakfast from Hokonui Gold but retained its own continuity and commercials. The station today continues to produce its own local continuity, weather forecasts and News bulletins are fed through from Newstalk ZB. In 2013 the South Otago breakfast was dropped and replaced with the Gore-based breakfast show.

=== Ashburton ===
Hokonui was expanded into Ashburton in July 2014 broadcasting on 92.5FM and 96.5FM. This station was originally a local station known as 3ZE and later became part of the Classic Hits network as Classic Hits 92.5. Local programming was reduced to a local breakfast show in the 1990s and for much of the 2000s this show was presented by Phill Hooper. In April 2014 all Classic Hits stations were rebranded as The Hits and in most markets the local breakfast presenter was moved to a daytime 9am - 3pm timeslot. The rebrand of Ashburton's Classic Hits 92.5 to The Hits was not received well by local Ashburton listeners both with a change in music format and the loss of a local breakfast show. In July 2014 a decision was made to launch Hokonui into the Ashburton market replacing The Hits on 92.5FM, local announcer Phill Hooper became the local breakfast announcer with the Hokonui station. The Hits remain in Ashburton on 89.3FM with no local programming. Hokonui Ashburton can also be listened to online 24/7 on iHeart Radio.

=== Taranaki ===
Hokonui began broadcasting in Hāwera in April 2015 on 88.2FM and 1557AM and closed down in December 2020. The 1557AM frequency previously broadcast NZME's network station Coast which featured a local breakfast show hosted by Bryan Vickery from their Hāwera studios. As part of Hokonui's launch in the area, Bryan Vickery moved to provide the breakfast show as part of the new station. Additionally, Hokonui used to broadcast in New Plymouth and Stratford on local FM frequencies. Hokonui Taranaki could also have been listened to online 24/7 on iHeartRadio.
