= The Hits (radio station) =

New Zealand adult CHR network

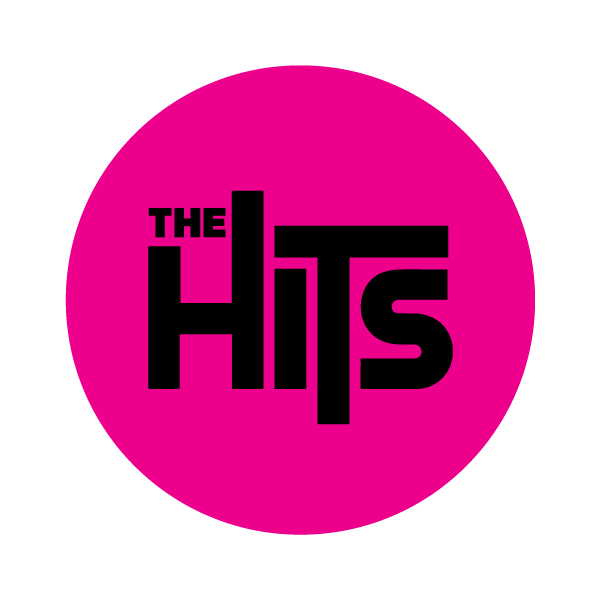
- 26 markets; New Zealand
- Broadcast area: New Zealand
- Frequency: 89.1 FM – 106.1 FM

Programming
- Language: English language
- Format: Adult CHR

Ownership
- Owner: New Zealand Media and Entertainment

History
- First air date: 1993; 33 years ago
- Former call signs: 1ZM in Auckland

Technical information
- Transmitter coordinates: 36.847°S 174.765°E

Links
- Webcast: 18 webcasts via iHeartRadio
- Website: thehits.co.nz

The Hits is an adult contemporary hit music radio network, broadcasting to 26 markets across New Zealand. It was set up by the government broadcaster Radio New Zealand in 1993 by consolidating existing stations into a single brand and has been privately owned since 1996. The Hits has had the broadest broadcast reach of any radio network in the country since 1996, and is now available on 40 full-power FM frequencies and 18 iHeartRadio streams.

Most of the individual stations started out as local AM stations owned by state broadcaster Radio New Zealand. Many have given a platform to broadcasting names like Selwyn Toogood, Paul Holmes, Peter Sinclair, Jenny-May Clarkson (née Coffin) and Jason Gunn. John "Boggy" McDowell was an announcer on the Southland station for 33 years. Despite a major reduction in local programmes since 1993, most stations still have a local four-hour breakfast programme or a five-hour daytime programme.

An estimated 461,200 people listen to The Hits every week, including 123,600 people in Auckland region. The network targets 25- to 54-year-old homeowners, socially-active parents and price-conscious household shoppers. In April 2014, the network re-branded from Classic Hits to The Hits to attract more younger listeners. Later that year, it came under the ownership of New Zealand Media and Entertainment.

== History ==
=== Early years ===
The Hits was originally known as Classic Hits up until April 2014. Classic Hits unofficially began in Auckland in 1987 when 1ZM (also known as 1251ZM at the time) changed music format to play "classic hits" music and branding was changed to Classic Hits Twelve Fifty One. In 1989 Auckland's Classic Hits moved to FM, becoming Classic Hits 97FM. The ZM station that exists in Auckland today is a new station created in 1997 to replace Magic 91FM.

The local version of the green diamond Classic Hits logo used by Classic Hits 97FM Auckland in the 1990s.

Other stations in the Classic Hits group began as local commercial stations owned by the Government-owned Radio New Zealand, at a time when the New Zealand Government had a monopoly on the New Zealand radio market. In some regions, the station that would eventually become The Hits, was the only available radio station in that region. By the early 1990s, Radio New Zealand had switched most of their stations to FM but retained the stations original AM frequency for coverage in areas where the FM frequency could not be reached or for listeners with an AM only radio. The AM frequency was used for talkback and specialist shows in addition to the regular programming on the FM frequency. To cut costs and prepare the stations for commercial sale, Radio New Zealand began rebranding AM stations to Newstalk ZB and rebranding the FM stations as Classic Hits. The Classic Hits stations originally retained their heritage identity until 2009, and used a uniform green diamond logo until June 2011.

The first group of the stations adopted the brand in late 1993 or early 1994. Waikato's 1ZH became Classic Hits ZHFM, Bay of Plenty's 1ZD Radio BOP became Classic Hits BOP FM, Rotorua's Geyserland FM became Classic Hits Geyserland FM, Radio Taranaki became Classic Hits Taranaki FM, and Hawke's Bay's Bay City Radio became Classic Hits Bay City Radio. Similar names were adopted by Radio Northland, Radio Nelson, South Canterbury's Radio Caroline, Dunedin's 4ZB and Southland's 4ZA.. Wellington Goldtime Oldies B90FM and Christchurch's Goldtime Oldies B98FM also rebranded as Classic Hits but retained the stations oldies format playing music from the 1960s and 1970s, all other Classic Hits stations at the time were playing music from the 1960s to current 1990s hits. Programming remained local on all stations between 6 am and 7 pm with a networked night show originally based in Hamilton and with Hamilton advertising, at this stage Auckland, Wellington and Christchurch were still local 24 hours a day. In 1995 the night show was moved to Auckland.

=== Privatisation ===
In July 1996 the New Zealand Government sold off the commercial arm of Radio New Zealand, which included, among other things, the Classic Hits brand. The new owner was The Radio Network, a subsidiary of APN News & Media and Clear Channel Communications, which operated as a division of the Australian Radio Network. The company expanded its reach with new purchases, converting most of its local stations to the Classic Hits brand.

The new business controlled 60% of the radio advertising market in November 1998 and more than half the market in 2002. However, in response to increased competition and falling market share, it looked for ways to cut costs. In its early years Classic Hits broadcast live local programmes in every region from Monday to Saturday, taking Auckland network programmes at night and on Sundays. In 1998 it reduced local programming to four hours a day in all regions except Christchurch, and introduced new network shows for mornings and afternoons. As Christchurch announcers left, their shows were also replaced with network programmes.

=== Network programming ===
In 1998 local programming on almost all Classic Hits stations was reduced down to a 4-hour breakfast show between 6 am and 10 am. By using new satellite networking technology, Classic Hits stations were able to have local shows at breakfast time, and have network shows presented from the Classic Hits Auckland studios with local advertisements, weather forecasts and breakouts at other times of the day. The local stations remained commercially viable in otherwise unviable markets and the network was able to invest in its brand and programmes. The company was able to leverage its reach for national advertising clients, including agency campaigns. At this stage Classic Hits 98FM in Christchurch was exempt from these changes and continued to run local shows 24 hours a day. Local content was also retained in Auckland as network presenters began presenting separate voice breaks for local Auckland listeners.

Also in 1998 all of The Radio Network's remaining local stations formed the Community Radio Network. Each station retained its local brands and breakfast shows, but took network programmes from Lakeland FM in Taupō at other times of the day. South Canterbury's Radio Caroline left Classic Hits to join the new network. Other stations included Lakeland FM, Whanganui's River City Radio, Tokoroa's Radio Forestland, Radio Wairarapa, Marlborough's Radio Marlborough, the West Coast's Radio Scenicland and Ashburton's 3ZE. In 2001 the stations were rebranded as Classic Hits, giving Classic Hits the broadest reach of any station in the country. A new Southern Lakes station was introduced in Queenstown in 2005, and the Radio Waitomo station in Te Kūiti closed down.

This Classic Hits logo was used after 2011, with a space for a local frequency.

In 2008, stations dropped heritage titles from their names. In 2009, a network breakfast show was introduced for King Country and for other markets when local hosts were away. In 2010, the King Country station was scrapped and local weekend breakfast shows were replaced with network shows. In late 2010, highlights of Christchurch and Wellington breakfast shows began to be broadcast during the weekend breakfast timeslot. Classic Hits Southland retained a local breakfast show with an unpaid announcer, and Dunedin produced a highlights show.

In 2012 local breakfast shows were cut back one hour, and the networked morning and afternoon shows were shortened to make way for a new drive show with Jason Gunn and Dave Fitzgerald from the Christchurch studio. The remaining local Saturday breakfast shows in Manawatū and Southland were also cut.

=== Relaunch as The Hits ===
On 4 April 2014 the National Business Review reported Polly Gillespie and Grant Kereama were planning to move from ZM to a new network breakfast show on Classic Hits. The newspaper's source claimed 20 local breakfast announcers would be made redundant. Polly and Grant had previously worked together on ZM originally to just a local Wellington audience from the 1980s and to a national audience from 2001. On 15 April The Radio Network confirmed Classic Hits would become The Hits, and on 28 April the change took effect. The Classic Hits brand ended at midnight the previous evening, and The Hits brand was used from breakfast that morning. The first song played under the new format was Best Day of My Life by American Authors.

Polly Gillespie and Grant Kereama took over the network breakfast programme. Most stations discontinued their local breakfast shows in favour of the new show, moving breakfast announcers to a new daytime slot. Others kept their breakfast shows, and continued taking network morning and afternoon shows. Stations began taking a single network programme when hosts were away, and many local breakfast co-hosts took on other roles within the company or found other jobs. The network's parent company, The Radio Network, became part of New Zealand Media and Entertainment in October 2014. At the end of 2016 Fairfax Media reported an article to say Polly and Grant had been axed from their morning show in favour of an Auckland-based show presented by Sam Wallace and Toni Street. The article initially failed to mention the change only affected Auckland and that Polly and Grant would continue presenting their breakfast from Wellington to those markets already taking the Polly and Grant show. In February 2017 Polly and Grant were taken off the air after a dispute with their employer and in March 2017 their departure from The Hits was confirmed at the conclusion of their contract that same month. The recently launched Auckland breakfast show consisting of Sarah Gandy, Toni Street and Sam Wallace were confirmed to take over the network breakfast timeslot on 26 March 2017. In February 2020 an announcement was made that Jono Pryor and Ben Boyce (Jono and Ben) would replace the current network breakfast with Toni Street and Sam Wallace moving to Coast. Jono and Ben previously hosted the drive show on The Edge and between 2012 and 2018 Jono and Ben had their own TV show self titled TV show Jono and Ben on TV3. In 2024, Megan Papas joined The Hits Breakfast show as newsreader and announcer. The show is now branded The Hits Breakfast with Jono, Ben and Megan. In 2024, Matty Mclean and PJ Harding also joined The Hits, as hosts of The Hits Drive show, broadcasting nationwide from 3 pm – 7pm.

== Music ==
=== Historic playlists ===
Classic Hits was named for its classic hits format, and the original Auckland station promoted itself as "The best of the 1960s, 1970s and the 1980s". When other stations started joining the network from 1993, they continued to create their own playlists. Regional stations retained a broad range of music, using the slogan "All the Hits from the 1960s to the 1990s". The Wellington and Christchurch stations played only music from the 1960s and 1970s, using the taglines "Good Time Oldies" and A Better Music Mix".

In 1996, regional stations dropped music from the 1960s and adopted the slogan "From the Nineties to the Seventies". In 1998, the Auckland and Wellington stations followed suit and a shared network playlist was rolled out. Classic Hits was the station of the "Hits of the 70s, 80s and 90s" from 1998, and the station of the "Hits of the 70s, 80s, 90s and Today" from 2000. The network dropped music from the 1970s in 2005, becoming the station of "80s, 90s and Whatever". It added more current hits in 2007, becoming the station of the "80s, 90s and now". It dropped more music from the 1980s in 2011, becoming the station of the "80s, 90s, today".

=== Current playlist ===
From 2014 to 2026, the network has had an hot adult contemporary playlist between the 1980s and the 21st century. It used the tagline "All the Hits, All the Time" in 2014, followed by "All Your Favourite Hits" in 2015 then "90's Till Now" from 2016 and "All The Hits You Know And Love" from 2022 to 2026.

Since mid-2026, 1980s music on The Hits was dropped to become the station that plays "90's 'til Now", with a strong focus on music from the 21st century and the current tagline "Love The Hits". Many of its tracks are from top 40 stars, like Coldplay, Taylor Swift, Ed Sheeran, Sam Smith, Pink, Olivia Dean, and Bruno Mars.

== Programming ==
The Hits run a standard breakfast, daytime, drive and night schedule with breakfast running between 6:00 am and 10:00 am daytime programming between 10:00 am and 3:00 pm, drive show between 3:00 pm and 7:00 pm and a 7:00 pm to midnight night show. The network broadcasts music, commentary and celebrity interviews. Some hosts have also carried out on-air stunts or recorded parody songs.

=== Breakfast ===
Jono Pryor, Ben Boyce and Megan Papas host a live network breakfast broadcast from Auckland, currently heard across most markets (excluding Hawke's Bay & Dunedin). News, sport and weather sourced from the NZME newsroom is heard on the hour and half-hour headlines by Megan Papas (Network) and Brin Rudkin (Regional), and traffic reports is broadcast every 15 minutes. Former newsreaders include Alison Leonard (2004–2007), Melanie Homer (2007–2010), Glen Stuart (2011–2014), Ash Thomas (2014–2019) Rachel Jackson-Lees (2020–2022), and Sam Worthington (2022–2023). Local breakfast shows can be heard in Hawke's Bay and Dunedin.

=== Weekdays ===
Since the rebrand to The Hits in 2014, most markets initially ran a local 6-hour daytime show between 9 am and 3 pm, in some cases the local show is spread across two markets, for example the same announcer presents a local show for Taranaki and Rotorua. Local content has since been reduced across the network with some stations receiving only network content.

As of 2026, the day show is presented between 10 am and 3 pm. The network daytime show is presented by Hayley Bath can be heard in markets that have a local breakfast show as well as markets with no local shows. This show is presented from The Hits Tauranga studios.

Prior to 2017 the network day shows were hosted by Sarah Gandy from the Auckland studios between 9 am-12 pm and Dave Fitzgerald from the Christchurch studios between 12 pm and 3 pm. Each of these presenters produced voicetracks for the network show as well as a local Auckland show with Dave Fitzgerald also providing local voicebreaks for Christchurch. Murray Lindsay hosted the daytime show for 16 years, from 1997 to 2012.

=== Other programmes ===
The Hits Drive is hosted by Matty McLean and PJ Harding. The show was previously hosted by Pat Courtenay (1998–1999), Andrew Dickens (1999–2000), Grant Bailey (2000–2003), Mark Bunting (2003–2007), Jason Reeves (2007–2010), Jason Gunn (2012–2013), Justin Brown (2014), Guy Parsons (2014), Stacey Morrison and Paul Flynn (2015–2019), Stacey Morrison, Mike Puru and Anika Moa (2019–2021), and Brad Watson and Laura McGoldrick (2022–2023).

The Hits Nights is hosted by Brin Rudkin. Former hosts include Peter Sinclair (1993–1997), Andy Dye (1998–1999), Gael Ludlow (2001–2002), Dene Young (2003–2004), Dave Smart (2004–2007), Will Johnston (2007–2008), Heemi Katene-Hill (2008–2009), Mike Plant (2009) and Estelle Clifford (2009–2021).

Saturday Morning Breakfast with Jono, Ben and Megan is a replay of their show and Sunday Morning is Best of Matty & PJ. Weekend afternoons feature a rotation of announcers. House Party, a commercial-free, announcer-free party music show, plays on Saturdays from 6 pm.

== Broadcasting ==
The Hits frequencies
Market	Frequency (MHz)
Northland	89.2
Auckland	97.4
Waikato	98.6
South Waikato	97.3 Tokoroa
Coromandel	100.3 Pauanui/Tairua & Whangamatā; 106.9 Whitianga; 106.0 Thames
Bay of Plenty	95.0 Tauranga
Rotorua	97.5 Rotorua; 90.8 Reporoa
Taupō	96.8
Gisborne	90.9
Taranaki	90.0 New Plymouth & Ōakura; 91.2 Ōpunake
Hawke's Bay	89.5 Napier/Hastings; 99.7 Wairoa
Whanganui	89.6
Manawatū	97.8
Kāpiti/Horowhenua	92.7
Wairarapa	90.3
Wellington	90.1
Nelson	89.6 Nelson & Tākaka; 1269 AM Tākaka
Marlborough	96.9 Blenheim; 89.1 Picton
West Coast	90.9 Westport; 97.5 Reefton; 90.7 Greymouth; 93.1 / 97.1 Hokitika; 90.5 South Westland
Canterbury	91.5 Kaikōura; 97.7 Christchurch; 96.5 Sumner
Mid Canterbury	89.3 Ashburton
South Canterbury	94.7 / 98.7 Timaru
North Otago	98.4 Oamaru
Dunedin	89.4 / 96.2
Southern Lakes	90.4 Queenstown; 99.9 Alexandra; 96.2 Wānaka
Southland	98.8 Invercargill

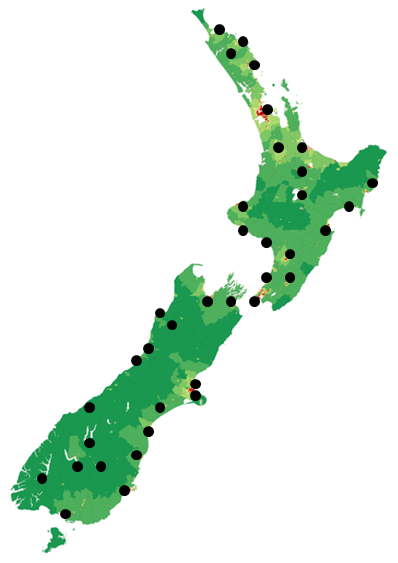
This map shows the distribution of the New Zealand population, and the location of The Hits stations.

=== Northland ===
The Hits is covered through the Northland region on 89.2FM.

Originally known as Radio Northland and broadcasting on 1026 AM and 1215 AM with the call sign 1ZN, the station moved to 96.0 FM in Whangārei during the late 1990s.

=== Auckland 97.4 FM ===
The Hits 97.4 is the flagship of the brand. The majority of the network announcers are based here.

The station is located at NZME Radio headquarters in Graham Street in central Auckland.

Local programming: The Hits runs a local day show, hosted by Hayley Bath, weekdays from 10 am – 3pm.

=== Waikato 98.6 FM ===
Originally Waikato's 1ZH this station was first started in 1949 broadcasting on 1310 AM. The station moved to 1296 AM in 1978. On air names included 1300 1ZH and Hits and Memories 1ZH during the 1980s.

The station became 98.6 ZHFM on 25 May 1990 when the station switched to FM. The Classic Hits name was actually used on a bumper sticker as well as A Better Music Mix before the station was re branded as Classic Hits ZHFM in 1993. The 98.6 ZHFM frequency can also be heard in Tauranga, the outskirts of Auckland and in a number of places in Northland due to its high power and the high elevation of its transmission site.

Mark Bunting joined the station in 2000 as the breakfast host, and moved to Classic Hits Auckland to present the Drivetime show over the entire Classic Hits network between 2003 and 2006. He moved back to the Waikato breakfast show in 2007.

Mark Bunting continued presenting breakfast following the rebrand to The Hits but was later fired when it was announced he would be moving to opposition The Breeze in Waikato. and the networked breakfast was put in place of this show.

The station is located on Hardley Street in Hamilton Central.

Local programming: Blair Dowling presents the local day show between 10 am am to 3 pm.

=== South Waikato 97.3 FM ===
Originally known as 1ZO or Radio Forestland on 1413 AM in the 1980s and 1990s, then 'Classic Hits Radio Forestland' before switching to FM in 2006. The station was part of the Classic Hits Community Radio Network.

The station used to have its own local breakfast show, but in 2012 this was replaced with the Waikato breakfast show hosted by Mark Bunting with local advertising. Following the rebrand to The Hits the station now has the same programming as Waikato

The station still has a local office located on Bridge Street in Tokoroa.

Local programming: Blair Dowling presents the local day show between 10 am to 3 pm.

=== Coromandel ===
The Hits Coromandel is the most recent station in the network which launched in December 2017. Prior to this, the station was called Sea FM and was an independently run station which merged with NZME in 2017. The station initially retained a local daytime show, however this ended in February 2018. The station broadcasts on the following frequencies across the Coromandel region, Thames 106 FM, Paunui, Tairua, Whangamatā 100.3 FM and Whitianga 106.9 FM.

=== Bay of Plenty 95.0 FM ===
Originally 1ZD Radio B.O.P. broadcasting on 1008 AM. The station moved to 95.0 FM around 1990 becoming 95 B.O.P. FM. The station was rebranded as Classic Hits in 1993. The Hits 98.6 FM Hamilton can also be heard in Tauranga.

The station is located on Cameron Road in Tauranga City.

Local programming: Hayley Bath presents the local weekday show between 10 am and 3 pm.

Will Johnston now hosts the local weekend show on Saturday's from 9 am – 12 pm.

=== Rotorua 97.5 FM ===
Originally known as Radio Geyserland on 1350 AM. The station moved to FM in 1988 and became known as 97.5 Geyserland FM. When the station was rebranded as Classic Hits in 1993 the name Geyserland was no longer used on air, however it still appeared on the station's logo at the time of rebranding. The Hits in Rotorua also broadcasts on 90.8 FM to the Reporoa, Broadlands, Ngakuru and Waikite Valley areas.

The station is located on Fenton Street in Rotorua City.

Local programming: Paul Hickey presents the local daytime show between 10 am and 3 pm.

=== Taupo 96.8 FM ===
Originally known as Radio Lakeland, broadcasting on 1494 AM in Taupō and 1386 AM in Tūrangi. The station moved to 96.7 FM in 1988 and was then known as Lakeland FM. For a short time a second frequency served Tūrangi on 89.6 FM, and later 92.4 FM but was discontinued.

Lakeland FM was the host of the Community Radio Network, a network established between community radio stations then operated by The Radio Network. Outside of the breakfast show, all Community Radio Network stations received content from the Lakeland FM studio. In 2001 all the Community Radio Network stations joined up with Classic Hits, with all programming outside of breakfast now coming from Auckland. At this point Lakeland FM became known as Classic Hits Lakeland FM. The station still has a local office located on Paora Hapi Street in Taupō.

Following the rebrand to The Hits the local breakfast was dropped and now the station initially had the same local daytime show as Rotorua.

Local programming: Local programming was cancelled in 2023.

=== Gisborne 90.9 FM ===
Originally known as 2ZG on 1010 AM, then 'The Coaster 2ZG' on 945 AM, before moving to 90.9 FM, and later being rebranded as Classic Hits 90.9. As of 2018 the station does not feature locally produced programming.

The station is located on the corner of Grey Street and Childers Road in Gisborne.

=== Taranaki 90 FM ===
The Hits in Taranaki originates from 2ZP Radio Taranaki, which broadcast on 1053 AM in New Plymouth and 1557 AM in Hāwera (as 2ZH). Around 1992, the station began simulcasting on 90.0 FM which was previously occupied by its sister station 'Q90FM'. It was then known as '90FM Radio Taranaki' before becoming Classic Hits 90FM in 1993.

Previous breakfast host for 15 years, Barney (Brent Procter) retired from broadcasting as of 20 December 2013.

The station is located in Broadcasting House on the corner of Powderham and Brougham Streets in New Plymouth Central. Taranaki originally had a local breakfast show between 6 am and 9 am presented by Adam Green and Eryn Deverson. From 2017 the Breakfast became networked from Auckland however local broadcasting remained with a new local workday show

Local programming: Paul presents a local 10 am to 3 pm show for Taranaki on 90.0 FM and South Taranaki on 91.2 FM.

=== Hawke's Bay 89.5 FM ===
Originally known as 2ZC or Bay City Radio broadcasting on 1280 AM, later 1278 AM, since 1 October 1957, the station moved to 89.5 FM in 1994 and it became 'Classic Hits 89FM – Bay City Radio'. In 2002, the station's name was altered to 'Classic Hits 89.5 – Bay City Radio'. From 1 January 2011, the station began a relay station in Wairoa on 99.7 FM.

This station broadcasts from the famous Broadcasting House building on the corner of Dickens & Dalton Streets in Napier – one of only two central city building's left standing following the 1931 Napier earthquake. Hawkes Bay maintained a local breakfast show as it transitioned into The Hits originally presented by Martin Good and Sarah Van Der Kley. Martin Good departed the station at the end of 2016 and Sarah Van Der Kley left to join Martin on another radio venture in September 2018. From 10 am all programming is networked.

Local programming: Breakfast with Adam Green and Megan Banks between 6 am-10 am.

=== Whanganui 89.6 FM ===
Originally known as 2XA this station began broadcasting in Whanganui in October 1949 on 1200 AM. The station was later renamed to 2ZW and moved to 1197 AM in 1978. The station was renamed to River City Radio in 1988 and 89.6 River City FM in 1993 after the station began broadcasting on 89.6 FM. In 2001 the station became Classic Hits River City FM after joining the Classic Hits network.

The station is located on the corner of Guyton and Campbell Streets, Whanganui. As of 2018, there are no local shows with all content networked from Auckland.

=== Manawatu 97.8 FM ===
Originally known as 2ZA and broadcasting on 940 AM, later 927 AM, the station began simulcasting on 97.8 FM in the early 1990s under the name 'AM-FM 2ZA'. Soon after the station was relaunched as 'The New 98FM'. 98FM eventually joined the Classic Hits network, but due to the 'Classic Hits' name already being used by an opposition station within the same market, 98FM was forced to adopt the name 'Greatest Hits 98FM'. Presumably, as a result of an agreement or settlement between the two companies, the opposition station dropped the 'Classic Hits' slogan and 98FM became 'Classic Hits 97.8'. Later, after more than 5 years of not using it, part of the 2ZA call sign was returned when the station became Classic Hits 97.8 ZAFM. Eventually all local programming was removed and today the station is fully networked.

The station is located on Main Street in Palmerston North.

=== Kāpiti Coast-Horowhenua 92.7 FM ===
Originally Classic Hits broadcast on 89.4 FM as a relay of Classic Hits 90FM in Wellington, this station broadcast on 89.4 FM as far back as 1991 when the station was 2ZB and later B90FM. In 2001 this relay was dropped and replaced with Newstalk ZB. Classic Hits made a return to the Kapiti area in 2004 on 92.7 FM a frequency previously used by Sports Roundup/Radio Sport. Programming on the new station was separate to Classic Hits 90FM in Wellington with the station presenting its own local breakfast. However, in 2009 this local breakfast show was dropped and replaced with Wellington's Classic Hits breakfast show. Following the rebrand to The Hits the Kapiti station takes the same local shows as Wellington.

Despite no local shows, the station still has a local office on Kapiti Road, Paraparaumu.

=== Wairarapa 90.3 FM ===
Originally known as 2XB this station was first started in March 1958 broadcasting on 840 AM. The stations call sign was changed to 2ZD in 1968 and in 1978 the station moved to 846 AM. The station was known on air during the 1980s and 1990s as Radio Wairarapa before becoming 90.1 Wairarapa FM in 1999, when the station began broadcasting on 90.1 FM. In 2001 the station was rebranded as Classic Hits Wairarapa. The broadcast frequency was changed to 90.3 FM in October 2010.

From 2013 the station no longer has any local show – following the rebrand as The Hits all shows are networked.

Despite no local shows, the station still has a local office on Church Street, Masterton.

=== Wellington 90.1 FM ===
Originally an FM repeater for Wellington's 2ZB (89.8 FM) in the early 1990s, the station was then relaunched as 'Goodtime Oldies B90FM' which also broadcast to the Kāpiti Coast on 89.4 FM. The station ran a 60s and 70s music format which originated from the Wellington studio and took no network programming. Around 1996, B90FM became 'Classic Hits 90FM' and an adjustment was made to the station's frequency, shifting from 89.8 FM to 90.0 FM. Unlike the rest of the Classic Hits network, 90FM ran with a "60s, 70s and 80s" format, whereas all other Classic Hits stations (with the exception of Auckland and Christchurch) were playing "70s, 80s and 90s". Programming continued to originate from Wellington until 1998 when local shows succumbed to network programming. The Kāpiti Coast repeater was eventually dropped and replaced with Newstalk ZB. On 27 October 2010, the station shifted frequencies to 90.1 FM to comply with Government broadcasting regulations.

Despite no local shows, the station still has a local office on Tory Street, Wellington.

=== Nelson 89.6 FM ===
Originally an FM simulcast of 'Radio Nelson' (also on 1341 AM), this station later became part of the Classic Hits family and was known as Classic Hits 90FM. The station broadcast to Nelson City on 89.8 FM and to the wider area (including Motueka and Tākaka) on 90.4 FM. There is also a relay in Golden Bay on 1269 AM. More recently, 90FM was known as 'Classic Hits 89.8 and 90.4' but this name was dropped in late 2006 after the 90.4 frequency was shifted to 89.8 (in synchronous transmission with the Nelson City outlet). This left Nelson launching Radio Hauraki on 90.6 FM in early 2007. **A national realigning of frequencies created another slight shift in frequencies with 'Classic Hits' moving to 89.6 FM, and 'Hauraki' to 90.4 FM, where they broadcast today.

The Classic Breakfast was hosted by Kent Robertson until his last show, on Friday 12 October 2012.

Today, now known as 'The Hits 89-6', the station remains located on Selwyn Place in Nelson City, Scott Radovanovich presented a local breakfast show across Nelson and Marlborough until it was replaced with the Auckland-based breakfast show towards the end of 2018. There is no local programme in Nelson, the show is networked out of Auckland.

=== Marlborough 96.9 FM ===
Originally branded as Radio Marlborough, this station was first launched in 1965 as 2ZE broadcasting on 1540 AM. The station moved to 1539 AM in 1978 and then became Radio Marlborough. A relay to Picton was also established in 1981, also on 1539 AM, but in 1993 moved to 1584 AM. Radio Marlborough began broadcasting on 96.9 FM in 1991. The station became Classic Hits Radio Marlborough in 2001 and at the same time the AM frequency was used to launch Radio Sport in the Marlborough region.

The station is located in Cavalier House on Market Street, Blenheim. The main transmitter is located in the Wither Hills, 4 km south-southwest of Blenheim, with a second transmitter broadcasting on 89.1FM in the Picton area.

During its time as The Hits the station had a local day show which then became a breakfast show. Scott Radovanovich presented the local breakfast show across Marlborough as well as Nelson until it was replaced with the Auckland-based breakfast show towards the end of 2018. No local programming originates from the Blenheim studios.

=== West Coast ===
Formerly known as Radio Scenicland, launched in 1968 on 747 AM in Greymouth (callsign 3ZA), 1287 AM in Westport (callsign 3ZW) and 1521 AM in Reefton (callsign 3ZR), this station was part of the Community Radio Network. The station later became known as Scenicland FM after moving to the FM band in November 1992, then joined the Classic Hits network around 2001. Today the station can be heard on 90.9 FM in Westport, 97.5 FM in Reefton, 90.7 FM & 93.1 FM in Greymouth, 97.1 FM in Hokitika and 90.5 FM in South Westland. This station is fully networked from Auckland with no local programming.

=== Christchurch 97.7 FM ===
Originally known as "B98FM – The Best Music Mix" in the early 1990s, this station was rebranded as 'Goodtime Oldies B98FM' several years later, taking on an oldies music format. By the mid-1990s, the name was altered to 'Classic Hits B98FM', then again to 'Classic Hits 98FM' and finally 'Classic Hits 97.7'. This was the only Classic Hits station to not have its local programming reduced to 4 hours in 1998. It remained live and local 24 hours a day until 2002, operating independently from the rest of the Classic Hits network. In 2003 the station began reducing local content to air during the daytime only, and as announcers left the station, reduced even further. From 2006 the only local content was the breakfast show, as with other Classic Hits stations at the time. The station was located on Worcester Street, Central Christchurch in the former TVNZ studio building. However, due to the devastating earthquake on 22 February 2011, the studio moved temporarily to Riccarton Road, Christchurch. The station is now on Armagh Street in the city centre.

Until Friday 20 July 2012, the local breakfast show was hosted by Jason Gunn and Dave Fitzgerald. From 23 July 2012 Jason and Dave moved to broadcasting a nationwide Drive show between 4 pm and 7 pm broadcast from the Classic Hits Christchurch studios to all of New Zealand. Jason and Dave also pre-recorded a show for the nationwide network to air on Saturday mornings, featuring the best bits from their show each week, but this was later axed in November 2013. At the end of 2013 Jason left Classic Hits and in 2014 a new afternoon show was started presented by Dave Fitzgerald and Guy Parsons still from Christchurch.

Prior to the rebranding to The Hits the local breakfast show was hosted by AJ Funnell, Chloe Emirali and Andy Ellis. With the changeover to The Hits, AJ Funnell was moved to present a local show between 9 am and 12 pm and Dave Fitzgerald presented a network show from Christchurch but at the same time separate voice breaks are recorded for local Christchurch and Auckland audiences. A local breakfast was reinstated in 2017 presented by Dave Fitzgeral and Brodie Kane, this show was networked to Ashburton and Timaru. The local breakfast was axed in March 2020 From 29 May 2017, the station began a relay station in Kaikōura on 91.5 FM.

Local programming: George Smith presents a local 10 am to 3 pm show for Christchurch.

=== Ashburton 89.3 FM ===
Originally known as 3ZE on 873 AM, this station was part of the Classic Hits Community Radio Network. The station began broadcasting on 92.5 FM in 1995 with the station rebranding to Ashburton's 3ZE FM, and in 2001 and became known as Classic Hits 92.5 ZEFM. Additional frequencies on 89.3 FM and 96.5 FM were later added.

When the station was rebranded The Hits, previous breakfast announcer Phil Hooper was shifted to the 9 am–3 pm slot. However, due to listener dissatisfaction with the changes, The Hits' parent company, The Radio Network, opted to launch the Gore based Hokonui brand into Ashburton on the 92.5 FM frequency. At the same time The Hits local announcer Phil Hooper was moved to Hokonui to present a local breakfast for an Ashburton audience with all other programming on Hokonui originating from Southland or Dunedin. The Hits continued to broadcast in Ashburton on 89.3 FM but now with complete network programming. The Hits 96.5 FM frequency was also reassigned to Radio Hauraki in 2014.

Between 2017 and 2020 The Hits Ashburton received its breakfast show from the Christchurch station, today Ashburton takes the networked breakfast. Despite having no local shows, the station still has an office in Somerset House, Ashburton.

=== South Canterbury 94.7 FM/98.7 FM ===
Originally Radio Caroline broadcasting on 1160 AM with the call sign 3XC from January 1949. In 1978 the station moved to 1152 AM and changed call sign to 3ZC.

The station joined the Classic Hits network in 1995, originally as Classic Hits 99FM. In 1998 the station was dropped from the Classic Hits network and became part of the Community Radio Network as South Canterbury's 99FM. At this stage programming was reduced to a local breakfast show, and outside this time all programming came from the Community Radio Network studio in Taupō. In 2001 all Community Radio Network stations became part of Classic Hits, and as a result the station rejoined the Classic Hits network as Classic Hits 98.7. At the same time the 1152 AM frequency was reassigned to Newstalk ZB.

In 2005 the station began broadcasting on 94.7 FM as well as the existing 98.7 FM frequency; as a result the station became known as Classic Hits 98.7 and 94.7. The station is located on North Street in Timaru. The former Sophia Street studios were demolished to make way for car parking.

Following the rebrand to The Hits the former breakfast announcer Sam Wilson was moved to present the 9 am – 3 pm show. Later in 2014 The Hits Waitaki announcer Josh McIntyre took over this show broadcasting the same show to both Timaru and Oamaru listeners. Josh McIntyre presented a local breakfast show for South Canterbury until 2018. This show was replaced from 2019 with the Christchurch-based breakfast show and in 2020 the network breakfast show.

=== Oamaru 98.4 FM ===
Originally known as 'Radio Waitaki' on 1395 AM, then as 'Classic Hits 98.4 Waitaki FM' after they converted to FM. The 'Waitaki' name was later dropped from most station identification and the station was then known as 'Waitaki's Classic Hits 98.4'.

Following the rebrand to The Hits the breakfast announcer Josh McIntyre was moved to present the local 9 am – 3 pm show but later in 2014 Josh was moved to The Hits Timaru in the same time slot presenting the same show to both Timaru and Oamaru listeners.

From 2017 The Hits Oamaru receives its breakfast show from the Dunedin station.

=== Dunedin 89.4 FM ===
Originally known as 4ZB on 1044 AM, then ZBFM on 89.4 FM when the station switched to FM in 1990. ZBFM joined the Classic Hits network in 1993 under the name 'Classic Hits 89FM' which was later changed to 'Classic Hits 89.4'.

The station is located on George Street.

Local programming: Breakfast with Callum Procter and Patrina Roche between 6 am and 10 am.

=== Southern Lakes ===
Launched in 2005 as Classic Hits Southern Lakes. The station covers Queenstown on 90.4 FM, Wānaka on 96.2 FM and Alexandra on 99.9 FM.

The station is based on Earl Street, Queenstown.

=== Southland 98.8 FM ===
This station was originally Southland's 4ZA on 864 AM. After converting to FM in the early 1990s, the station was known as 'Southland's 4ZA 98.8 FM' for some time before joining the Classic Hits network as 'Classic Hits ZAFM'. The station in the past broadcast in Te Anau on 90.4 FM but this frequency was reassigned to Hokonui in 2022.

Historically the breakfast show was hosted by John "Boggy" McDowell. Boggy started on the 4ZA breakfast show on 1 June 1979 and remained presenting this show until 21 December 2012. Local news and sport was read by Malcolm Gayfer until the end of 2012. A local news service is no longer available. Malcolm Gayfer was with the station for 25 years and for a time was Boggy's co-host. More recently the breakfast show was presented by James McRobbie and Liv McBride, James left in early 2018 with his short lived replacement being Bradley Craig (BC). Following the departure of BC and with Liv going on maternity leave a decision was made to network Dunedin's breakfast show presented by Callum and P into Southland. In April 2020 the network breakfast from Dunedin was replaced with the national network breakfast show. Craig Waddell (Wal) presents the daytime show between 10 am and 3 pm.

The station is located on the corner of Don and Deveron Streets, Invercargill. The studios are also used to broadcast the Marcus Lush night show on Newstalk ZB and some programming for Hokonui.

== Other services ==
=== Events and promotions ===
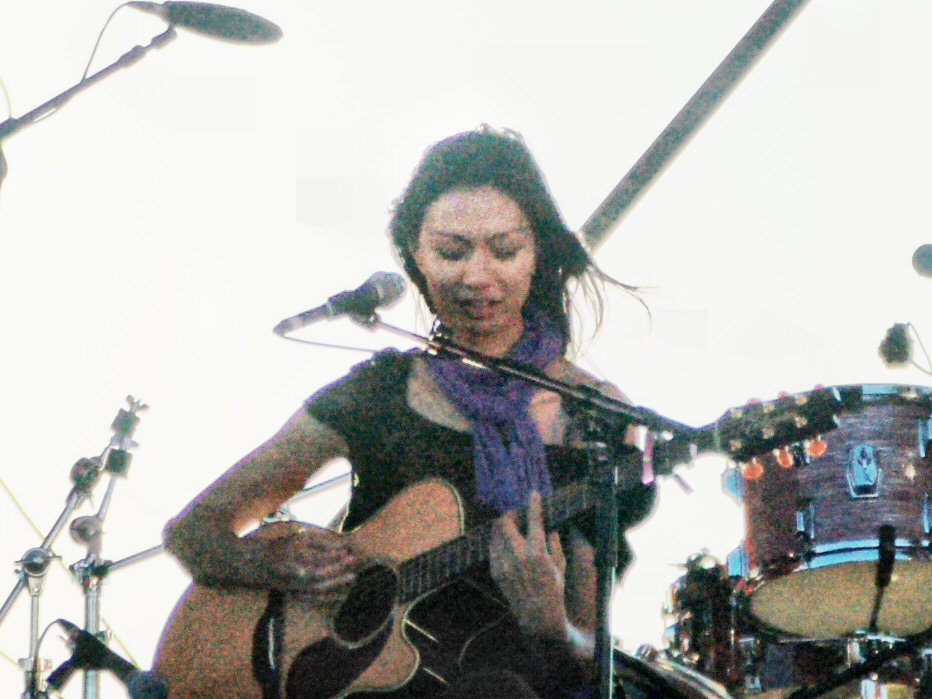
Boh Runga performing at the Acoustic Winery Tour, an event which Classic Hits has sponsored.

The Hits runs a range of promotions, from activities at shops and gyms to giveaways of cash, cars and travel. It is the official media partner of Netball New Zealand;Silver Ferns netball squad, the Fast5 Netball World Series and ANZ Premiership.

Local stations are involved in marathons, airshows, sporting events, concerts, Christmas celebrations and more. They work and have worked closely with a number of New Zealand charities including KidsCan, Plunket, NZ Blood, Cancer Society and more.

=== News and information ===
The Hits broadcasts its own news and sport bulletins on weekdays drawing from NZME resources, and broadcasts bulletins from Newstalk ZB on weekends. Brin Rudkin presents the breakfast Newsfeed updates on the regional stations (6 am-9 am), before taking over the network updates (10 am-12 pm) – while Megan Papas reads news, sport and weather during Jono, Ben and Megan's network show (6 am-10 am).

The stations feature regular traffic information, including TimeSaver Traffic updates in Auckland, Hamilton, Tauranga, Hawke's Bay, Wellington, Christchurch and Dunedin. Community notices and cancellations are also broadcast on a daily basis.

Local hosts often editorialise about local events, politicians and organisations. Some hosts been elected to local councils or have been the focus for political campaigns. Some have also been the subject of on-air abuse by hosts on rival stations, being described as "fuckwits" or a "catty bitch".

The network is one of New Zealand's five nationwide civil defence broadcasters. Some local stations have performed this role during emergencies, and others have committed to do so if emergencies occur. The Christchurch station provided updates during the 2010 Canterbury earthquake, and continued broadcasting from a temporary studio in a motel room when its studio was damaged in the 2011 Christchurch earthquake.

=== Website and social media ===
The Hits website and social media pages keep communities up to date with local events and promotions. The website was launched in 2005, and redesigned in 2007, 2011 and 2014. It currently features sections on recipes, parenting issues, videos, events, galleries, competitions and breaking news. The network has Twitter and Facebook pages, and each station has a Facebook page.

== Ratings ==
As of May 2026, The Hits has the ninth-highest share of the New Zealand commercial radio market at 5.0%.
