= Radio Waitomo =

Radio station in Te Kūiti, New Zealand

Coordinates: 38.3348°S 175.1407°E

Radio Waitomo 1ZW was a radio station that broadcast on 1170 kHz on the AM band in Te Kūiti, New Zealand. The station was started on 15 March 1985 by the Radio New Zealand Commercial network. Local content was limited to just a few hours per day, programming was shared with King Country Radio at other times and on air at these times branded as King Country Radio and Radio Waitomo.

In July 1996 the New Zealand Government sold off the commercial arm of Radio New Zealand, the sale included Radio Waitomo. The new owner was The Radio Network, a subsidiary of APN News & Media and Clear Channel Communications, which operated as a division of the Australian Radio Network. Local content was limited to just a few hours per day. At other times the station took a feed from King Country Radio or 1ZH (Hamilton) or National Radio.

In June 1998, Radio Waitomo joined the newly established Community Radio Network. As a result, the station continued to run a local breakfast show between 6-10am, but outside of these times the station carried the network feed from Taupo.

On 1 December 2000, the Taupo-based Community Radio Network was replaced with the Classic Hits network programme from Auckland. Radio Waitomo was subsequently re-branded as Classic Hits Radio Waitomo.

In November 2003, due to dwindling listenership and rising costs, The Radio Network decided to close the station.

The following year, The Voice Of Waikato/Waitomo Trust arranged a lease of the station and the frequency and it was re-launched as The Voice Of Waitomo.

In July that year, the station reverted to its original name: Radio Waitomo 1ZW.

Less than a year later, Radio Waitomo closed down permanently due to poor management and lack of local support.
