= Radio Sport =

- New Zealand
- Frequency: Various

Programming
- Format: News, sports talk, sports commentary

Ownership
- Owner: NZME Radio

History
- First air date: 1996
- Last air date: 30 March 2020

Links
- Website: www.radiosport.co.nz

Radio Sport (previously Sports Roundup) was a New Zealand sports radio network and the talkback sister network of Newstalk ZB. It held commentary rights for most cricket matches, international and domestic rugby union games, NRL rugby league games, trans-Tasman basketball and New Zealand tennis tournaments.

The network also updated developments at golfing events, bowls tournaments and other sporting events. At other times Radio Sport played talkback and hourly news and sports updates.

== History ==
=== Sports Roundup ===
Sports Roundup

Radio Sport began as Sports Roundup, a Radio New Zealand programme during the 1980s and early 1990s that provided live commentary of summer sports like cricket. It was broadcast on several frequencies around the country on a time-share with the AM Network on frequencies historically used for The Concert Programme.

=== Radio Sport ===
Radio Sport

Sports Roundup was replaced with dedicated Radio Sport network through its privatisation of the sports commentary department in 1996.

The station was targeted at male sports fans from its outset. As Newstalk ZB's sister network, Radio Sport provided all sports news coverage for the Newstalk ZB news service carried by Newstalk ZB, Classic Hits FM, ZMFM, Radio Rhema, Radio Hauraki, Southern Star, Coast and Life FM since its inception. Unless the network was taking live commentary from a sporting event, Radio Sport simulcasted Newstalk ZB Monday–Thursday 19:00–20:00 and weekends 6:00–9:00 and 12:00–18:00.

Due to the COVID-19 pandemic affecting most major sporting events, Radio Sport was closed at 1 pm on 30 March 2020 and replaced with a simulcast of Newstalk ZB.

== Programmes ==
Radio Sport consisted of nationally broadcast domestic and international sports programming. Local opt-outs were limited to ad breaks and some seasonal programming.

Radio Sport also provided a sports-based news service, produced in house, and updated at regular intervals.

=== Early Breakfast ===
The Country 'Early Edition' presented by Rowena Duncam aired Monday-Friday from 5 am until 6 am from the Dunedin Studios, and featured highlights of the 12 pm show and a cross to the Radio Sport Breakfast team.

=== Breakfast ===
Radio Sport's programming was led by its breakfast programme. Since 2017 the breakfast programme was Radio Sport Breakfast with Kent Johns, Nathan Rarere and Marc Peard from 6 am until 9 am. The programme also featured News and Sport Every 30 minutes. Until 17 July 2008 the programme was presented by ONE News sports presenter Tony Veitch, but Veitch resigned from his roles with Radio Sport and ONE News after allegations that Veitch assaulted his girlfriend in 2006. Veitch confessed on 8 July 2008 that such allegations were true, at a press conference and resigned on 17 July. The vacancy was filled by former drive-time presenter D'Arcy Waldegrave, with former New Zealand cricketer Mark Richardson as his co-host. Richardson was joined by Andrew Mulligan joining him in late 2013 to host the Crowd Goes Wild Breakfast. In 2015 it was announced that Richardson was to leave the show in the middle of that year, with former New Zealand cricketer Simon Doull to take over as co-host a fortnight after Richardson's departure. The Crowd Goes Wild Breakfast remained on air until the end of 2016.

=== Mornings ===
Radio Sport Mornings was hosted by Jason Pine & Sam Hewitt. The 9–12 slot was filled by veteran sports broadcaster Brendan Telfer until 2013. From 2014 experienced sport broadcaster Martin Devlin took over the slot after being shifted from sister station Radio Hauraki. In mid 2018 Jason & Sam took over. The show featured regular correspondents, interviews and talkback, it also contained light hearted segments based entirely on TV game shows, sport matches predictions & a comical, lighthearted look at the weekends sports presented in a 1950s BBC style. A common theme on the show was WWSD (what would Sam do).

=== Afternoons ===
The Country with Jamie MacKay presented from the Dunedin studios aired between 12 pm – 1 pm. This show was broadcast on all Radio Sport stations except in Auckland.

The afternoon talkback programme between midday and 4 pm on the station was hosted by Daniel McHardy from the Wellington studios. Between 12–1 pm the show only aired on the Auckland station, due to all other stations airing the rural based programme The Country. After 1 pm though, the show aired nationwide. The show primarily featured calls from its listeners and predicts the weekend's sports on Friday afternoons.

=== Drive Show ===
D'Arcy Waldegrave and Angus Mabey hosted the drive show between 4 pm and 7 pm weekdays which featured regular guests, interviews and sums up the days top sporting stories.

=== Sportstalk ===
Sportstalk with D'Arcy Waldegrave aired from Monday–Thursday nights 7 pm – 8 pm (Simulcast from Newstalk ZB).

=== Evenings ===
Reloaded hosted by Eli Mwaijumba aired from 8 pm until 10 pm. Reloaded featured interviews, highlights, reaction and the best live sport. Until 2017 the previous night show 'The Night Train' was a Talkback-based show.

=== Overnights ===
Overnight, Radio Sport aired FOX Sports Radio from America, through a live internet feed or Talksport simulcast during the English Premier League season.

=== Weekends ===
Weekends were dominated by live commentaries, punctuated by shows with Veitch (until 2018) and Watson and other simulcast programming from Newstalk ZB.

- Fridays 7 pm – 10 pm – Super Rugby commentaries
- Fridays 10 pm – 12 am – The Continuous Call Team
- Saturdays 6 am – 9 am – The All Sports Breakfast with Nigel Yalden (Simulcast from Newstalk ZB)
- Saturdays & Sundays 9 am – 12 pm – Radio Sport Weekender with Mark Watson
- Saturdays & Sundays 12 pm – 6 pm – Weekend Sport with Mark Watson (Simulcast from Newstalk ZB).
- Saturdays 2 pm – 5 pm Saturday Rugby Club (Radio Sport Wellington Only)
- Saturdays 2 pm – 5 pm Otago Score Board (Radio Sport Dunedin Only)
- Saturdays 2 pm – 5 pm Sportswave (Radio Sport Nelson Only)
- Saturdays 6 pm – 12 am – Saturday Night Sport: Live sports commentaries with the Radio Sport commentary team
- Sundays 6 am – 8 am – Sunday Mornings with The Resident Builder (Simulcast from Newstalk ZB)
- Sundays 8 am – 9 am – The Sports Power Hour with Mark Watson (Simulcast from Newstalk ZB)
- Sundays 6 pm – 8 pm – NRL Live' courtesy of ABC Radio Grandstand

== Stations ==
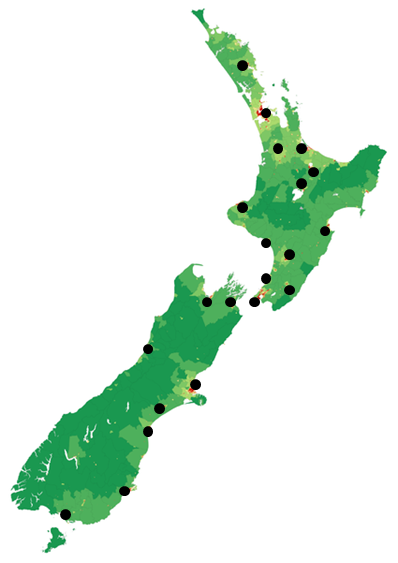
This is a map of Radio Sport stations operating in 2016.

=== Frequencies ===
These are the frequencies Radio Sport previously broadcast on at 30 March 2020 closure:

- Whangārei – 729 AM
- Auckland – 1332 AM
- Hamilton – 792 AM
- Tauranga – 1521 AM
- Rotorua – 1350 AM
- Taupō – 107.7 FM
- New Plymouth – 774 AM
- Napier – 1125 AM
- Wanganui – 1062 AM
- Manawatu – 1089 AM
- Wairarapa – 87.6 FM
- Wellington – 1503 AM
- Nelson – 549 AM
- Blenheim – 98.5 FM
- Westport – 91.7 FM
- Greymouth – 89.9 FM
- Christchurch – 1503 AM
- Ashburton – 702 AM
- Timaru – 1494 AM
- Dunedin – 693 AM
- Invercargill – 558 AM

The former Radio Sport AM and Wairarapa and Taupo LPFM frequencies were rebranded as Gold AM on 1 July 2020. Match commentaries continue as part of Gold AM programming. The other FM frequencies were rebranded; Blenheim as Radio Hauraki, Westport and Greymouth as ZM.

=== Historic frequencies ===
These are the frequencies Sports Roundup broadcast on:

- Auckland – 882 AM
- Hamilton – 792 AM
- Napier – 909 AM
- Wellington – 657 AM
- Christchurch – 963 AM
- Dunedin – 900 AM
- Invercargill – 1026 AM
