= Coast (radio station) =

New Zealand radio network

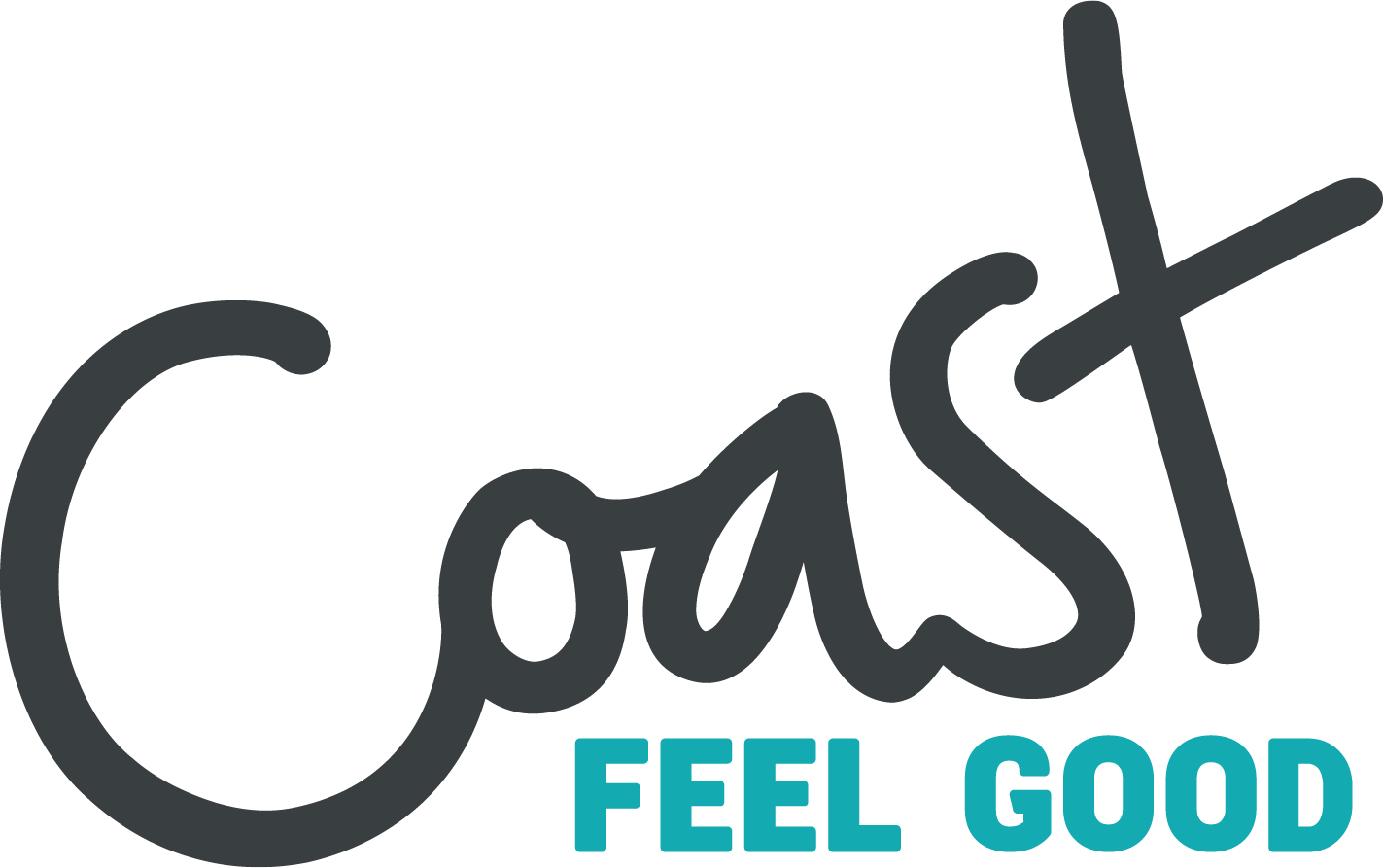
- New Zealand
- Broadcast area: 22 markets in New Zealand
- Frequencies: FM: 89.6 MHz-107.1 MHz; AM: 900 KHz-1593 KHz

Programming
- Format: Classic hits

Ownership
- Owner: NZME Radio

History
- First air date: 26 April 2004; 22 years ago

Links
- Website: http://www.thecoast.net.nz

Coast is a New Zealand radio network playing a mix of "feel good" hits predominantly from the 1970s and 1980s. The network includes stations in 22 towns and cities. It broadcasts from studios in central Auckland, owned and operated by New Zealand Media and Entertainment.

The Coast network reaches an estimated 315,100 listeners each week. The audience is almost equally male and female, with a 52% female skew.

Coast format was launched 26 April 2004.

== History ==
=== Early years ===
Coast originally started in Hawke's Bay in 2002, as a local station. The history of this station dates back to 1995 as The Wireless Station broadcasting on 1530 AM and playing music from the 1930s, 1940s and 1950s. The Wireless Station was started/operated by The Wireless Station Ltd for three years from November 1995 and was then leased or sold to Hawke's Bay Media Group in 1998 and re-branded as Goodtime Gold, playing music from the 1960s and 1970s. In 1999 it was renamed simply Gold 1530.

Gold 1530 was leased (or sold) to The Radio Network in 2000 and was re-branded as Jammin' Oldies 1530 AM or JO 1530 in June 2000. In 2002 the station became the very first station under the Coast brand name and in 2004 Coast began producing their programme from Auckland networked back to Hawke's Bay on 1530 AM (then on 1584 AM from 2011), and later to the rest of New Zealand.

=== Relaunch ===
The final re-branding of the station was to the current name Coast 1530. In 2004 the station became voice tracked from Auckland in preparation for its launch in the Auckland market on 26 April 2004. The network expanded beyond Auckland and Hawke's Bay to other markets later in the year. Initially, the playlist consisted of music from the 50s, 60s and 70s, with a very small portion from the late 40s.

The network rose to third place in the Auckland radio survey ratings in 2006, just two years after it began. Then programme director Mike Regal credited the station's success to serving the baby boomer gap in the market that had previously been ignored by marketers, advertisers and media companies. He said the station was a fine balancing act between being neither a station for the young or a station for seniors. "We don't want to be too cool and hip with it and risk alienating people, but on the other side we didn't want to sound too old either," he told the New Zealand Herald.

=== Recent years ===
In the current radio survey results Coast has 100,000 listeners in Auckland each week and a 5.1% market share, making it the sixth highest-rating radio stations in the highly competitive Auckland radio market.

By 2014 most of the older playlist (pre-1960) had been dropped, and at times more recent artists could be heard, including Adele, as the station moved to a more Classic Hits-type format.

Coast is now a complete FM network after migrating to FM in late 2018 and early 2019 in a number of markets where coverage had previously on been only available on AM - including Hawke's Bay, Whangarei, and Taranaki.

In 2011 the original 1530 AM frequency leased by The Radio Network and used to start the first Coast Station in Hawke's Bay was returned to its original owners.

== Programmes ==
=== Coast Breakfast ===
Coast's Feel Good Breakfast hosted by Toni Street, Jason Reeves and Sam Wallace was launched in May 2020. In January 2021 the show was introduced in Tauranga, Coromandel and Thames, replacing a local breakfast show hosted by Bay of Plenty identity Brian Kelly, the former host of the Coast network breakfast show. The change was made with the move of Kelly to host of Gold Sport's breakfast show.

The station's foundation breakfast host was well-known veteran announcer Mike Oliver, who left in early 2011 before dying from illness in 2014. Oliver had previously worked as a host on Radio Liberty and a voice over artist on Prime TV.

For a period, Hāwera had its own local breakfast show called The 1557 Breakfast. This show was originally aired on Newstalk ZB in the Hāwera region when Newstalk ZB used the 1557 AM frequency. After Newstalk ZB in Hāwera changed to frequency 1278 AM, the show was dropped and replaced with the Auckland-based programme, but it was later picked up by Coast. The 1557 AM frequency in Hāwera has since been reassigned to Hokonui.

=== Other programmes ===
Lorna Riley has hosted the weekday time slot on Coast since 2015. The former Easy Mix breakfast host also served as a traffic presenter for Newstalk ZB During more than 25 years in the media industry, she has appeared on Shortland Street and Interrogation and a host of advertisements and advertorials like Family Health Diary. Founding daytime host Jacqui Taite left the station at the end of 2011. Gael Ludlow filled the role in 2012 and Murray Lindsay hosted in 2013. During 2014, the station ran with a day show hosted by Nik Brown.

Coast's Feel Good Drive Home, the afternoon show on Coast, is currently hosted by Grant Kereama, who took over in October 2025 from Jon Dunstan. Jon had taken over from Jason "JT" Tikao and Mel Homer during 2020. JT and Mel began hosting in January 2018 when Jason Reeves moved to Coast Breakfast. Reeves replaced Murray Lindsay, formerly the long-running day time host of Classic Hits. Drive has also been hosted by Rick Morin until 2012. During 2013 Southland radio identity John "Boggy" McDowell hosted the drive show after a 33-year stint as host of Southland's Classic Hits 4ZA since 1979. The move had been prompted by a desire for more leisurely mornings and the chance to broadcast to a national audience. He told The Southland Times certain things had "fallen into place that made it a perfect time to move to a new time slot". However, despite dropping his Southland nickname "Boggy", McDowell was moved to Gore's Hokonui radio station in 2014, swapping places with Nik Brown.

Jason "JT" Tikao now hosts Coast's Night Show between 7pm - 12 midnight. Before 2013 the night programme was automated.

Jon Dunstan hosts Coast Feel Good Weekends, from 6am - 12pm.

== Stations ==
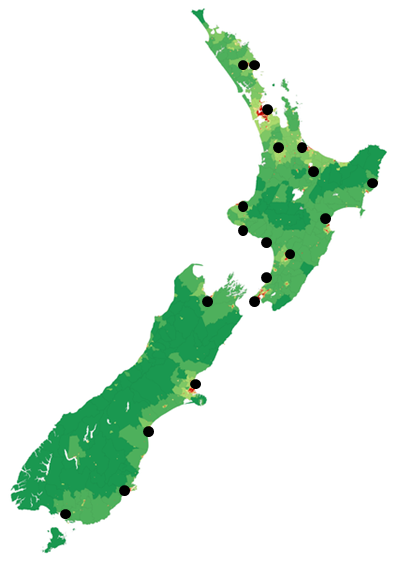
This map shows the Coast stations.

Coast's station group has expanded rapidly since its Auckland launch in 2004. It was initially introduced in coastal markets before being introduced provincial inland markets like Rotorua in 2008.

=== Frequencies ===
- Bay of Islands - 89.6 FM
- Northland - 96.4 FM/900 AM
- Auckland - 98.2 FM
- Waikato - 105.0 FM
- Coromandel - 97.9 FM
- Thames - 107.1 FM
- Tauranga - 97.4 FM
- Rotorua - 96.7 FM
- Gisborne - 106.1 FM
- Hawke's Bay - 99.9 FM
- Taranaki - 106 FM/1323 AM
- Whanganui - 98.4 FM
- Manawatū - 105.8 FM
- Kāpiti Coast/Horowhenua - 95.9 FM
- Wairarapa - 91.9 FM
- Wellington - 95.7 FM
- Nelson - 100.8 FM
- Marlborough - 94.5 FM
- Christchurch - 90.1 FM/105.7 FM/1593 AM
- Dunedin - 104.6 FM/954 AM
- Wānaka - 94.6 FM
- Southland - 92.4 FM

Coast's network stream is also available on the iHeartRadio website and app.

== Other services ==
=== News ===
Coast has news, sports, traffic and weather bulletins from the NZ Herald newsroom at the start of every hour, followed by music, comments from the announcers on the music being played and issues of the day.

During breakfast Coast has half-hourly news and sports updates, presented by Brin Rudkin (6am-12pm inclusive). During afternoons Raylene Ramsay presents hourly news and sports updates from the ZB Affiliates (1pm-6pm inclusive).

During weekend days, there are hourly news and sports updates and weather forecasts.

=== Promotions ===
Coast regularly runs competitions and is famous for Toni Street's Big Spender, where one listener can enter to win a $10,000 shopping spree. Previous locations have included Hawaii, Las Vegas, and New York State. Coast also runs Feel Good 500 Countdown, a week-long countdown of the top 500 Feel Good songs, as voted by listeners.

== Ratings ==
As of May 2025, Coast has the tenth-highest share of the New Zealand commercial radio market at 5.0%.

Coast commercial radio ratings (May 2025)
Market	Station share	Change	Rank
All markets	5.0	▼ −0.2	10
Auckland	5.2	▼ −0.4	4
Christchurch	1.8	▼ −0.2	12
Wellington	4.6	no change	8
Waikato	6.9	▲ +0.3	6
Tauranga	8.4	▲ +0.6	2
Manawatū	5.6	▼ −0.8	12
Hawke's Bay	2.8	▲ +0.7	11
Northland	15.3	▲ +0.1	1
Dunedin	3.7	▼ −0.5	11
Taranaki	5.4	▲ +0.4	9
Nelson	2.8	▼ −0.3	12
Southland	4.8	▲ +0.6	10
Rotorua	5.1	▼ −1.1	8
