= Grant Kereama =

New Zealand radio and Television presenter, actor (born 1967)

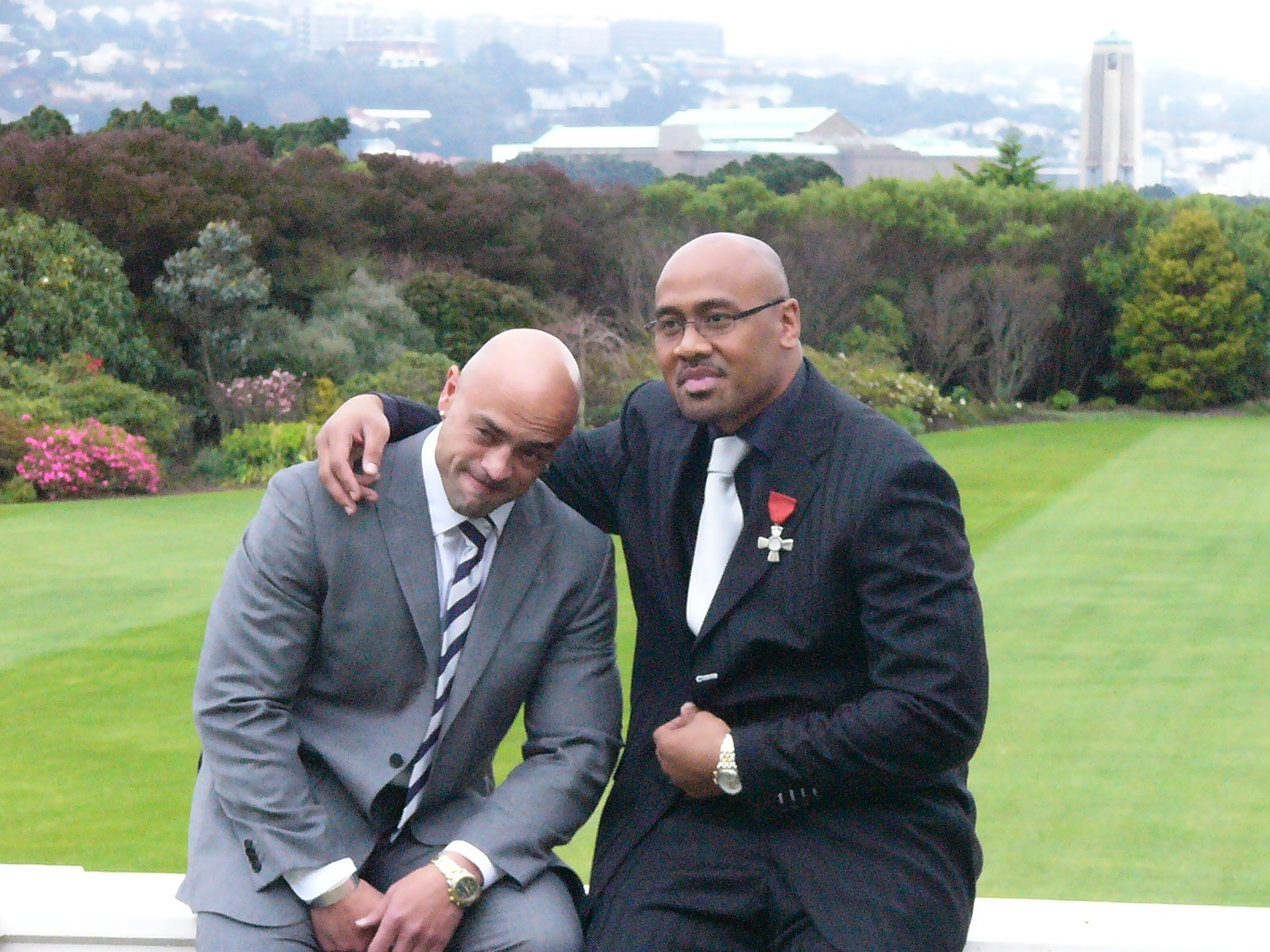
- Kereama (left) and Jonah Lomu in 2007
- Born: 30 May 1967 (age 59); New Zealand
- Spouses: Polly Gillespie (m. 1989; div. 2016) Lisa Brockelsby (m. 2017)
- Presenting career
- Show: The Polly and Grant Show
- Stations: ZM, The Hits, More FM, Gold FM, Coast
- Network: NZME; MediaWorks New Zealand
- Style: Disc Jockey
- Country: New Zealand

Grant Rodney Hokowhitu Kereama (born 30 May 1967) is a New Zealand radio host, formerly on The Polly and Grant Show on the ZM and More FM network. Kereama co-hosted his morning show with his ex-wife Polly Gillespie.

== Career ==
Kereama began in radio in 1987 on ZMFM The Music Leader in Wellington. His first full time show was the 7 to midnight slot from 1988 to 1990. He then was promoted to the ZMFM day show until 1991. Kereama moved north to Auckland to host the 9 to 12 show on 89FM for six months, then returned to Wellington where he became the anchor of the "ZMFM Morning Crew" alongside his wife, Polly Gillespie, and Nick Tansley. The Morning Crew was hugely successful in the 1990s taking the number one ratings spot in 1995. In 2001, the ZM Morning Crew became a nationally syndicated show broadcasting throughout New Zealand.

From February 1992 to November 1996 Kereama was a lottery host alongside Hilary Timmins.They presented the weekly live Lotto draw every Saturday night.

In 2014, Kereama and Gillespie left ZM and launched a morning show on a new radio station called The Hits, which replaced the previous Classic Hits stations.

Kereama and Gillespie left The Hits in 2017, and later moved to More FM. In mid-2020, MediaWorks New Zealand restructured More FM and laid off Kereama and his co-host.

Kereama has acted in two feature films. In 2019 he played Tohunga Makutu in High Octane Pictures' Killer Sofa. In 2020, he played Dean in the New Zealand Film Commission's Lowdown Dirty Criminals. In 2022, Kereama co-starred as Myles in the New Zealand web production Self Help, produced by Wrestler.

Kereama is currently the afternoon drive announcer on NZME's Coast.

Kereama competed in amateur bodybuilding from 2004 to 2007. He won the 80 kg to 90 kg open men's category at the IFBB Wellington Championships in 2005, and finished in second place in the same category at the IFBB New Zealand championships later that year. In 2006 Kereama placed 3rd in the 80 kg to 90 kg category in the IFBB Wellington championships, and again placed second at the New Zealand championships.

== Personal life ==
In 1989, Kereama married Polly Gillespie, who would become his longtime co-host. They have three children together.

They split in 2015, with the divorce concluding in 2016. Kereama married Lisa Brockelsby in 2017.

Kereama donated a kidney to then-All Black rugby player Jonah Lomu.
