= Polly Gillespie =

New Zealand radio broadcaster

- Born: Pauline Gillespie
- Spouse: Grant Kereama 1989–2016
- Presenting career
- Show: The Polly and Grant Show
- Stations: More FM, rova, Today FM
- Network: MediaWorks New Zealand
- Time slot: 6–10am Monday – Saturday on More FM, 6–9am Weekdays on rova
- Style: Disc jockey, comedian
- Country: New Zealand
- Website: www.morefm.co.nz/home/shows/polly---grant-on-more-fm.html

Pauline "Polly" Gillespie is a New Zealand former radio presenter. She co-hosted The Polly and Grant Show on Saturday mornings from 6-10am and the All-Day Breakfast show on Rova with her ex-husband, Grant Kereama.

Gillespie and Kereama hosted the ZM breakfast show from 1991 to 2014, making them the longest-serving breakfast duo in New Zealand. The show rated well in Wellington, and enjoyed success across New Zealand after it was launched nationwide in 2001.

On 28 April 2014, Gillespie and her ex-husband launched a new show on The Hits, owned by NZME. They left The Hits in 2017, and moved to a Wellington weekday breakfast show on More FM that ended in June 2020.

Gillespie also wrote an agony aunt column for Woman's Day New Zealand until the magazine closed in April 2020. She has written an autobiography, titled The Misadventures of Polly Gillespie. She had previously outlined her family history in an opinion article published in The New Zealand Herald in 2016.

In November 2021, Gillespie was announced as part of the lineup for MediaWorks' brand new talk radio network, Today FM which launched in March 2022 but ceased broadcasting a year later. Gillespie was retained by station owners MediaWorks to present a series of short-form podcasts, under the brand name The Polly Podcast Network, which launched in June 2023 and ended in early 2024.

She has since left the broadcasting industry, and retrained to become a counsellor and therapist.
