= ZM Whangarei =

New Zealand
- Broadcast area: Whangārei, New Zealand

Programming
- Format: Hit Music

Ownership
- Owner: Radio New Zealand before 1996; The Radio Network after 1996

History
- First air date: 1995

Technical information
- Transmitter coordinates: 35.7144°S 174.337°E

Links
- Website: zmonline.com

94.8ZM Whangarei (originally known as 93ZM) is a hit music radio station in Whangārei, New Zealand. It is a station of the ZM network, and is owned and operated by New Zealand Media and Entertainment.

== History ==
ZM was first started in the Northland town of Whangārei in 1995 by Radio New Zealand broadcasting on 93.1 MHz as 93ZM. At the time local ZM stations were operating in Wellington as 91ZM Wellington and Christchurch as 91ZM Christchurch. A ZM station did previously exist in Auckland as 1ZM but this station became the very first Classic Hits station in 1987.

In July 1996 the New Zealand Government sold off the commercial arm of Radio New Zealand, which included, among other things, the ZM stations. The new owner was The Radio Network, a subsidiary of APN News & Media and Clear Channel Communications, which operated as a division of the Australian Radio Network.

In 1997 new owner The Radio Network began expanding the ZM brand to other markets, a new local station was established in Auckland as 91ZM Auckland (creating a return to the Auckland market). Networked ZM stations were also introduced from 1996 onwards.

In 1997 93ZM became a network station with programming originating from the 91ZM Auckland studios and Auckland announcers producing pre-recorded local voice breaks to a Whangārei audience, some announcers from 93ZM were relocated to Auckland. The breakfast show on 93ZM originally remained local but in 1998 announcers Jaala Dyer and Sandy Antipas were moved to Hamilton to produce a local breakfast for 89.8ZM Waikato with the show networked back to Whangārei.

In 2000 ZM switched to a single network feed and the Waikato-based breakfast show was discontinued. From 2000 onwards 93ZM heard the same Auckland based announcers but the local voice breaks were dropped in favour of single nationwide voicebreaks in all markets. At this point the announcers simply called the station ZM.

In 2005 93ZM moved from 93.1 to 93.2 MHz and in 2006 93ZM traded places on the Northland radio dial with Radio Hauraki 93ZM shifted to 95.1 MHz and Hauraki took over ZM's vacated 93.2 MHz frequency. On air the station was now known as 95.1ZM.

In 2010 ZM in Whangārei moved to 94.8 MHz as part of the government move to re-align radio frequencies around New Zealand.

== Past Local Programming ==
- Breakfast 6 am–10 am
  - 1995–1998: Jaala Dyer
  - 1995–1998: Sandy Antipas
  - 1997–1998: Dave Smart
  - 1998-1999: Networked from Hamilton
  - 2000 onwards: Networked from Auckland/Wellington
- Daytime 10 am–3 pm
  - 1995-1996: Mike Chapman
  - 1996-1997: Jason Winstanley
  - 1997: Andrew Szusterman
  - 1997 onwards: Networked from Auckland
- Drive 3 pm–7 pm
  - 1995-1996: Trudi McRae
  - 1996–1997: Dave Smart
  - 1997 onwards: Networked from Auckland
- Nights 7 pm–Midnight:
  - 1995–1997: Dallas Gurney
  - 1997 onwards: Networked from Auckland
