= Polly & Grant =

- Genre: AC; Gossip
- Running time: 6 am–9 am Monday - Friday; 6 am–10 am Saturday
- Country of origin: New Zealand
- Language: English
- Home station: rova and More FM
- Hosted by: Polly Gillespie; Grant Kereama
- Produced by: Dave Rybinski
- Recording studio: Wellington
- Original release: 2001 (ZM 2001–April 2014; The Hits April 2014–2016; More FM July 2017–June 2020; rova July 2017–2020) – 2020

Polly & Grant (previously known as The ZM Morning Crew and The Polly and Grant Show) was a radio breakfast show on New Zealand radio network More FM, and an internet-only radio station on Rova. The show was presented by Polly Gillespie and Grant Kereama. It was previously produced by Marc Peard, known as "New Hot Guy", and previously aired on ZM and The Hits.

In 2007 the Morning Crew won the Best Metropolitan Music Breakfast Hosts award at the New Zealand Radio Awards.

== Show history ==
Polly and Grant first teamed up together in the late eighties along with Nick Tansley presenting their show exclusively on ZMFM in Wellington; this was at a time when ZM in Wellington was live and local 24 hours a day and not networked to any other region. Polly and Grant initially started out working different shifts before moving together to the breakfast show. The show has always been a top rating show in the Wellington market and Polly and Grant have won awards at the New Zealand Radio Awards.

The Wellington-based breakfast show hosted by Polly, Nick and Grant was networked into Palmerston North in 1997 when ZM launched in Palmerston North. The Palmerston North show was the same as the Wellington show with live voice breaks mostly tailored to the Wellington audience. In 2000 Polly, Nick and Grant went off the air in Palmerston North when all shows on ZM in Palmerston North were replaced with Auckland-based shows.

In 2001 the Wellington-based ZM breakfast show went nationwide, previously other regions had the Auckland-based morning show hosted by Marcus Lush, however this show did not rate that well so as a result the Wellington-based show became the nationwide breakfast show. Originally ZM ran their breakfast show between 6AM and 9AM for all regions and then after 9AM the ZM Morning Crew would continue their show exclusively for Wellington only with other regions starting the workday show at 9AM, ZM chose to do this so that one hour of the show could still be treated as a local show for the Wellington audience.

At the start of 2004 ZM decided not to renew Nick's contract and the show was now presented by just Polly and Grant, Nick worked on the breakfast show on Wellington's ZM between 2005 and 2008. Later in 2004 ZM ran a competition to find an extra for their show who would be known as their apprentice. The winner was Cam Bisley who was known as the 19 Year old virgin from the Hawkes Bay. Cam lasted on the station until 2007. From 2004 the show was produced by Mark Peard who was known on air as New Hot Guy.

In 2014 a decision was made to rebrand the Classic Hits network as The Hits with Polly and Grant to present the breakfast show to 20 markets, for most markets this meant the loss of a local breakfast but the addition of local programming between 9am and 3pm, some markets did retain their local breakfast. For markets that chose not to take Polly and Grants show listeners could opt to hear a highlights show between 6pm and 7pm. The show content is also available online.

On August 12, 2015 Polly and Grant announced on air their decision to separate however they assured listeners they will continue to host the show together.

They left The Hits in March 2017, later moving to More FM to present a local breakfast show. Initially this was weekends only, however it later expanded to weekdays as well. However, due to downsizing by Mediaworks, their More FM show was cancelled in June 2020.

== Previous ZM Morning Shows ==
While Polly and Grant have presented their show to the Wellington audience since the 1990s other region previously had their own local shows or a network show.

=== Si and Phil (Christchurch) ===
During the 1990s the ZM Morning Crew on 91ZM Christchurch was hosted by Simon Barnett and Phil Gifford. The show rated well in the Christchurch market and was networked into Dunedin when ZM launched in Dunedin as 96ZM in 1996. Si and Phil left ZM in April 1997 after being offered a large amount of money to work on local station 92 More FM at the same time More FM was started in Dunedin as 98 More FM and Si and Phils show was networked onto the station but shows on More FM in Dunedin during the daytime were local. Today Simon Barnett presents an afternoon show with Phil Gifford on Newstalk ZB.

=== Rik and Katrina (Christchurch) ===
Rik van Dyke and Katrina Smith were the hosts of the ZM Morning Crew on 91ZM Christchurch between 1997 and 2001 after Si and Phil left. Their show was also networked onto 96ZM Dunedin and 96ZM Invercargill. Previously Rik and Katrina had worked together as the morning hosts on Taranaki's Energy FM (now More FM). Rik and Katrina were originally joined by Chuckie Shearer in 1997 until the middle of 1998 when Chuckie left to go to Christchurch's Classic Hits 97.7. After Chuckie left the 91ZM Christchurch drive host Jason Royal joined the show for a year as the third member of the crew. However Jason made a return to the drive show in 1999. Rik and Katrina's show was axed at the start of 2001 when ZM made a decision to close their Christchurch studio and network the Wellington breakfast show into Christchurch with other shows being based from Auckland. Rik accepted a job hosting the breakfast show on Classic Hits 97.7 in Christchurch and Katrina was also offered this position but instead took a job with Fifeshire FM (now More FM) instead. Rik is now the programme director for The Breeze in Christchurch and Katrina is at The Breeze in Wellington.

=== Jaala and Sandy (Northland and Waikato) ===
Jaala Dyer and Sandy Antipas were the hosts of the ZM Morning Crew in Northland and Waikato during the late nineties. The show originated on Whangarei's 93ZM as a local breakfast show when ZM started in Northland, the show was moved to Hamilton and networked back to Whangarei in 1998 to 1999 with local 'out and about' content provided by Andrew Hepworth in Waikato and Dave Smart in Northland. Both shows were replaced with the Auckland-based breakfast show in 2000.

=== Marcus Lush ===
Marcus Lush was the host of the 91ZM Auckland breakfast show after ZM made a return to the Auckland region around 1996. The show was later networked to northern regions such as Rotorua and Hawkes Bay after ZM began expanding to these regions and in 2000 the show went nationwide replacing network shows in all regions except Wellington and Christchurch where these regions kept their local shows. The show rated poorly and as a result was axed at the start of 2001 when the Wellington Crew took place as the new nationwide breakfast show.
