= 1ZM (New Zealand) =

Auckland; New Zealand
- Frequency: 97.4 MHz (from 1989)

Programming
- Language: English

Ownership
- Owner: Radio New Zealand (until 1996); The Radio Network (after 1996)

History
- First air date: 1920s
- Former call signs: 1ZM, 1ZD, 1YD, 1ZM
- Former frequencies: 1251 KHz (1978–1989)

Technical information
- Transmitter coordinates: 36.847°S 174.765°E

1ZM was a radio station in Auckland, New Zealand operated by Radio New Zealand and was originally part of the ZM group of stations and later became the very first Classic Hits station. Today this station is owned by New Zealand Media and Entertainment and is host station of The Hits network.

== History ==
=== Early years ===
The ZM name derives from the original 1ZM radio station founded by W.W. (Bill) Rodgers in the late 1920s in Manurewa, then a farming village south of Auckland. The original station broadcast on 1250AM.

The station was later acquired by the NZ Government owned Radio New Zealand (which at the time was known as the National Broadcasting Board) and moved 26 km north to Auckland City, where it shared space in the 1941 Art Deco Broadcasting House studios of 1ZB. In April 1944 1ZM was handed over to the US AFRS military broadcasting service to provide entertainment for US troops on R & R leave in Auckland, as part of the AES Mosquito Network. The American programming, drawn from all three US radio networks (ABC, NBC and CBS) and played without commercial advertisements, proved popular not only with US troops but also with Aucklanders who appreciated the lively style of presentation and the latest American hits. After the war 1ZM was returned to the government broadcasting department, New Zealand Broadcasting Service (NZBS) and its successor, but still state-owned, New Zealand Broadcasting Corporation (NZBC).

As part of a reshuffle of frequencies and callsigns 1ZM was renamed, first 1ZD and then 1YD, in line with the Wellington metro station 2YD which had opened in 1937. 1ZM /1YD was turned into a low-power non-commercial metro music station, broadcasting retro hits and oldies from 5 pm to 10 pm weeknights, and from 10 am to 10 pm weekends. Later, to help meet demand for advertising in the single State owned commercial station 1ZB, 1YD was authorised to carry low-level commercials read live at the microphone, and by the 1960s transmitter time in Auckland was leased in the mornings to a private commercial operator Radio i, which later secured its own AM channel.

=== Rise of ZM ===
The start of 'pirate' broadcasting in 1966 from Radio Hauraki, based on a barge in the Hauraki Gulf, and the consequent opening up of NZ radio to private investors led to a sharp rise in competition. In 1973 the NZBC looked to sharpen up the rather fusty image of its metro stations by rebranding the three YD stations in Auckland, Wellington and Christchurch back to ZM and promoting them under the brand ZM Maxi Music.

In 1978, channel spacing in the AM band in New Zealand was adjusted from 10 kHz to 9 kHz. As a result, 1ZM moved to 1251AM.

=== Introduction of overnight programming ===
In 1981, Radio New Zealand stations were finally granted the right to broadcast 24 hours per day; previously only the domain of private operators. Overnight networked programming was introduced with the ZM All-Nighter show. Programming was produced from the 1ZM studios in Auckland and networked to 2ZM Wellington and 3ZM Christchurch. 2ZK in Hawkes Bay and 4ZG in Gore also took the ZM All-Nighter. The show was offered as an 'alternative music choice to the top 40-based formats offered by the private stations and was originally hosted by Barry Jenkin from Auckland. With his departure in 1983, the alternative format remained, but the music played was more top-40-based with the large percentage of NZ music. The ZM All Nighter continued until 1989 even after 1ZM Auckland changed format in 1987.

=== Commercial-free era ===
In 1982, 1ZM lost its bid for an FM license and with the Broadcasting Tribunal allowing two new private radio stations into the Auckland market, 1ZM was required to re format and adopt a 'Limited Sponsorship' model in place of its full commercial licence. This was an attempt to assist the new operators in establishing a revenue base. For 1ZM this meant that although the station could still run paid-for advertisements, those messages could not have music underneath, mention price or be longer than 25 words. Within 2–3 years, both 1ZM's financial and audience market share dropped significantly as advertisers and young listeners were attracted by the higher quality sound of the FM stations, despite the absence of long commercial breaks on 1ZM. 1ZM at the time promoted itself as "Total Music ZM" to emphasise the commercial-free format. The station's management was still determined to secure an FM warrant and even employed a sales team to sell '30-second shares' in its first day of broadcast in stereo.

=== Exit from ZM brand and introduction of Classic Hits brand ===
By 1987, 1ZM was still running as a limited commercial station. With its final attempt unsuccessful under the old Broadcasting Warrant scheme, a decision was made to attempt a further re-format and a 'Classic Hits' format was first introduced. This format had been successful for a number of years in the USA. The small, tightly rotated playlist of 'Hit Radio' tunes was abandoned and the station instead targeted 25- to 44-year-olds with a playlist containing over 3,500 songs, playing everything from Dean Martin to AC/DC. The 1987 version of Classic Hits was unlike anything else available at that time. The re formatting was essentially an attempt to recover audience, but was still costing Radio NZ over $1 million per annum to operate as it was the only "commercial station" legally required to run no commercials. The change to the Classic Hits format saw 1ZM drop the ZM name and become Classic Hits Twelve Fifty One.

The change in name marked the birth of the Classic Hits brand that would eventually be rolled out to other radio stations across New Zealand. The ZM stations in Wellington and Christchurch were not affected by the requirement to run limited commercials and went on to switch to FM stations during the mid 1980s.

=== Switch to FM ===
The Lange government's liberalisation of the broadcasting warrant system (which was ultimately abolished in 1989/1990) saw the station finally win the right in December 1989 to broadcast in stereo on 97.4 MHz in Auckland and broadcast commercials. The 1251 kHz frequency licence was transferred to Christian broadcaster Radio Rhema. The move to FM saw the station change branding to Classic Hits 97FM. The original line up was: 06:00am Peter Mac and Mary-Jane Tomasi, 09:00am John Hawkesby, 12:00pm Bob Gentil & 3:00pm Darren Mills.

=== Nationwide roll-out of Classic Hits brand ===
In 1992 Classic Hits 97FM in Auckland changed its logo to a green diamond with the words Classic Hits on a banner above and the 97FM frequency inside the diamond. A year later Radio New Zealand decided to rebrand many of their local stations to use the same logo as Classic Hits 97FM with the station's local frequency in the middle. The on-air imaging was standardized across all stations now branded as Classic Hits but initially all stations remained live and local.

=== Privatisation ===
In 1996 the New Zealand Government sold the Radio New Zealand commercial group of stations, the sale included all stations branded as Classics Hits and the ZM stations. From 1998 most Classic Hits stations were reduced to a local breakfast show between 6am and 10am and outside these times took network programming from the Classic Hits Auckland studio. The announcers on Classic Hits 97FM Auckland started producing two voices break outside of breakfast programming, a localized voice break for Auckland listers and a second voice break targeted at a nationwide audience.

=== Return of ZM to Auckland ===
The ZM brand returned to Auckland on 91.0FM as 91ZM Auckland in 1997 on a frequency previously used by local Auckland station 91FM. This station was a completely separate station to the original 1ZM station and is now the host of the ZM network.

=== Station today ===
On 28 April 2014, all stations part of the Classic Hits network were rebranded as The Hits. A networked breakfast presented by Polly Gillespie and Grant Kareama was introduced to almost all The Hits stations with the former breakfast announcer moved to present a 6-hour show between 9am and 3pm. In Auckland the then breakfast announcers Justin Rae and Stacey Morris were moved to the Drive show now presented as a nationwide show for all markets. Estelle Clifford was moved from the night show slot to the 9am to 12pm timeslot presenting her show to regions that take network programming during this time. The former network drive host Dave Fitzgerald, who presented his show from Christchurch, was moved to the 12pm - 3pm show now producing a localized show for Christchurch and Auckland listeners in additional to a network show. Other weekday network days originate from the Auckland studios and usually contain a localized voice break for Auckland and a networked voice break for other regions. In February 2017 The Hits Auckland started a new local breakfast show for Auckland, the show is presented by Sarah Gandy, Sam Wallace and Toni Street. With Polly and Grant leaving The Hits in March 2017 this Auckland breakfast show became the new network breakfast show on The Hits.
