= ZM Waikato =

New Zealand
- Broadcast area: Hamilton, New Zealand

Programming
- Format: Hit Music

Ownership
- Owner: New Zealand Media and Entertainment

History
- First air date: 1984

Technical information
- Transmitter coordinates: 37.7925°S 175.5614°E

Links
- Website: zmonline.com

This was the logo of 88.8 FM in 1984.

ZM Waikato (also known as 89.8ZM) is contemporary hit radio network in Hamilton, New Zealand. It is owned by New Zealand Media and Entertainment, and broadcasts via FM, and worldwide via the Internet. The network targets the 15–39 demographic specialises in a chart-music playlist of pop, rock, hip hop and dance music.

== History ==
The ZM station in the Waikato region has its origins as an independently owned station called 898FM and later part of an early incarnation of The Breeze and finally became part of the ZM network after the station was sold to The Radio Network.

== 898FM and Kiwi FM ==
898FM was started in 1984 broadcasting on 89.8FM with the call sign 1JJJ. The original station played a Contemporary hit radio format. 898FM broadcast from Mount Te Aroha with the station boasting the greatest FM coverage area in New Zealand, the station could be heard throughout the Waikato region including Coromandel Peninsula, King Country and Taupo and in the Western Bay of Plenty region including Tauranga, Mt. Maunganui and Rotorua.

In 1986 898FM became known as 89.8 Kiwi FM and later Kiwi FM, this station has no connection to the Kiwi FM network stations that operated between 2005 and 2015.

== The Breeze 89.8FM ==
Throughout the 1990s the station changed ownership several times. In 1993 Kiwi FM in Waikato, 91FM Auckland and Radio Windy were all rebranded as The Breeze. All three stations continued to operate as local stations and in Waikato this station was known as The Breeze on 89.8. The Auckland station The Breeze on 91 and Waikato The Breeze on 89.8 ran a Hot AC format which the slogan Not Too Heavy, Not Too Soft. The Wellington station ran an Easy Listening format.

== 89.8ZM ==
By 1996 the station was owned by Prospect Media Limited which operated 11 stations in Auckland and Waikato including Easy Listening i and Radio Hauraki. In late 1996 Prospect Media was purchased by The Radio Network.

In early 1997 Auckland station The Breeze on 91 and The Breeze on 89.8 in Waikato were closed down. A new ZM station was started in Auckland as 91ZM Auckland on the 91.0FM frequency. In Waikato the 89.8FM frequency was used to start ZM as 89.8ZM with all programming initially originating from the 91ZM Auckland studios with announcers producing local pre-recorded voice breaks for the Waikato audience, giving the illusion of a local show. ZM in Invercargill and Dunedin used a similar method to receive network programming from 91ZM Christchurch.

In 1998 the 93ZM Whangarei breakfast announcers Jaala Dyer and Sandy Antipas moved to Hamilton and began producing a local breakfast show for Waikato with the show networked back to Whangarei. Outside breakfast the station continued to network from 91ZM Auckland.

In 2000 the local breakfast show was discontinued with 89.8ZM and 93ZM Whangarei now taking the Auckland-based network breakfast at the same time ZM switched to a single network feed with the local voice breaks dropped in favour of a single live voice break heard on almost all ZM stations.

Originally 89.8ZM broadcast from Mount Te Aroha with coverage reaching all of the Waikato and the Bay of Plenty, in the early 2000s this was changed to broadcasting from two separate transmitters, Ruru east of Hamilton and Kopukairua in Tauranga, allowing the Bay of Plenty listeners to hear local advertising and local information such as weather separate from the Waikato listeners but both stations remained on 89.8 MHz.

In 2010, the Bay of Plenty frequency was changed from 89.8 FM to 89.4 FM.
