= Bay City Radio =

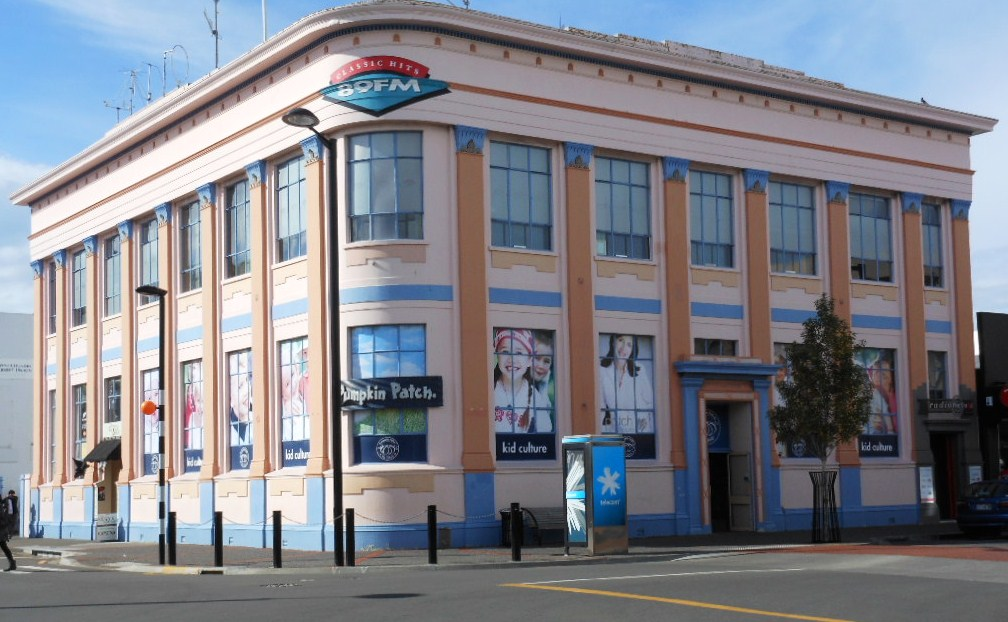
- Dalgety's Building, Napier in 2011, the broadcasting location for Classic Hits 89FM
- Napier; New Zealand
- Broadcast area: Hawke's Bay
- Frequency: 89.5 MHz

Programming
- Language: English language
- Format: Adult contemporary

Ownership
- Owner: Radio New Zealand until 1996; The Radio Network after 1996

History
- First air date: 1957
- Former call signs: 2ZC

Technical information
- Transmitter coordinates: 38.8054583°S 175.4641228°E

Bay City Radio was a radio station in Napier, New Zealand.

The station was started by Radio New Zealand (which at the time was known as the National Broadcasting Service) on 1 October 1957 using the call-sign 2ZC and broadcasting on 1280 kHz AM. On air the station was branded as its callsign 2ZC with the slogan Twin-City Radio as the station served both Napier and Hastings.

In 1977 Radio New Zealand started a second station called Apple Radio. When Apple Radio commenced as a stand-alone station from the previously shared Hastings studio, 2ZC was re-branded as Bay City Radio.

In 1978 after AM band in New Zealand was changed from 10 kHz spacing to 9 kHz spacing as a result the station moved to 1278AM In December 1981 a fire started in one of the studios causing considerable damage. The whole top floor of the Dalgety building (Broadcasting House) was then completely refurbished and modernised with state-of-the-art equipment.

In 1993 Bay City Radio joined the Classic Hits network and became known as Classic Hits Bay City Radio. In 1994, the station moved to 89.5FM and became Classic Hits 89FM Bay City Radio. Later the AM frequency would be used to broadcast Newstalk ZB into the Hawke's Bay region.

In July 1996 the New Zealand Government sold off the commercial arm of Radio New Zealand, which included, among other things, the Classic Hits branded stations. The new owner was The Radio Network, a subsidiary of APN News & Media and Clear Channel Communications, which operated as a division of the Australian Radio Network.

In 1998 Classic Hits 89FM Bay City Radio was reduced to just 4 hours of local programming between 6 and 10 am 7 days a week. Outside this time nationwide shows based from Auckland took over, and the announcers simply called the station Classic Hits. The breakfast show was shortened to a 3-hour show in 2012 on all Classic Hits stations.

In 2010, now known as Classic Hits 89.5, programming was extended to the Wairoa area broadcasting 99.7FM. Previously the 99.7FM frequency had been used to broadcast Hawkes Bay's ZM station and historically for Greatest Hits FM96, Better Music 96FM and Classic Rock 96FM.

On April 28, 2014 all stations part of the Classic Hits network were rebranded as The Hits. While most regions dropped their local breakfast show in favour of a networked breakfast presented by Polly Gillespie and Grant Kareama, The Hits in Hawke's Bay was one of four regions to retain the local breakfast show.

Local breakfast Monday to Friday is currently hosted by Adam and Megan. Outside these times the station runs The Hits networked programs which originate from either Auckland, Wellington or Christchurch.
