= 91.8 FM =

FM radio frequency

The following radio stations broadcast on FM frequency 91.8 MHz:

== Morocco ==
- Radio Mars at Agadir

== China ==
- GRT News Radio in Shenzhen

== New Zealand ==
- More FM in Auckland

== Uganda ==
- Boona FM

== Indonesia ==
- Radio FBI 91.8 Bali
