= ZM Christchurch =

- New Zealand
- Broadcast area: Christchurch, New Zealand
- Frequencies: 91.3 MHz; 90.9 MHz (Sumner)

Programming
- Format: Hit Music

Ownership
- Owner: New Zealand Media and Entertainment

History
- First air date: 1969
- Former call signs: 3YD, 3ZM (1323AM); 3ZZM (91.3FM)

Technical information
- Transmitter coordinates: 43°36′12″S 172°38′58″E (Sugarloaf)

Links
- Website: zmonline.com

ZM Christchurch (previously 3ZM, Radio Nova, ZMFM and 91ZM) is a hit music radio station in Christchurch, New Zealand. It is a station of the ZM network, and is owned and operated by New Zealand Media and Entertainment.

== History ==
=== Early years ===
The ZM station in Christchurch has a history dating back to 1963 as local station 3ZM which originally broadcast on 1400AM. The station was started by the New Zealand government owned Radio New Zealand (which at the time was known as the New Zealand Broadcasting Corporation). In 1973 3ZM was joined with 1YD Auckland and 2ZM in Wellington to form to youth orientated ZM network, 1YD became 1ZM.

In 1978, in a bid to compete against local Christchurch station Radio Avon 3ZM was rebranded as Radio Nova (coincidentally 'Avon' spelt backwards) playing an Easy Listening format similar to that of Radio i in Auckland. Listener interest was strong at first but later ratings dropped and the station was reverted to 3ZM playing the same music format as that of 1ZM and 2ZM. 3ZM later moved to 1323 kHz in 1978 after the AM band in New Zealand was changed from 10 kHz spacing to 9 kHz spacing.

=== FM broadcasting ===
3ZM switched to FM in 1986 and was relaunched as ZMFM using similar branding to ZMFM Wellington which had switched to FM in 1985. Originally when ZM in Christchurch was switching to FM they believed they would be broadcasting on 92.9 MHz and printed stickers with this frequency on it. Test transmissions took place on this frequency but when the station finally launched on FM the frequency 91.3 MHz was used instead with 92.9 MHz being allocated to C93FM. Following the switch to FM, ZMFM ceased broadcasting on AM several months later. The 1323 kHz frequency was used for Maori broadcasting by Aotearoa Radio in the early 1990s, then by Radio Liberty in the mid-1990s. It is no longer in use by any station in the region.

Since the main Sugarloaf transmitter in the Port Hills could not serve the Sumner area, a second transmitter and frequency for 91ZM Christchurch was established there on 89.2 MHz; in 2009 this was adjusted to 90.9 MHz. Today the station is referred to as Canterbury's 91-3ZM.

In 1989 ZMFM Christchurch was rebranded as 91 Stereo ZM and later 91ZM. ZMFM Wellington retained its branding as ZMFM. In 1994 ZMFM Wellington was rebranded as 91ZM with both stations now using the same slogan 91ZM. Nationally most listeners knew the ZM brand as 91ZM during the 1990s.

=== Dunedin and Invercargill 96ZM stations ===
96ZM Dunedin was the very first networked ZM station, the station began broadcasting on 95.8 MHz in June 1996. An automated computer system allowed an announcer in the 91ZM Christchurch studio to produce two separate voice breaks, one for listeners on 91ZM Christchurch and a second voice break for listeners on 96ZM Dunedin. In June 1997 96ZM Invercargill was launched with its programming also originating from 91ZM Christchurch. The announcer now produced 3 separate voice breaks, programming between the 3 stations was not in-sync with each other due to varied lengths of voice breaks and advertising, often the final song heard each hour was cut short as the 3 stations synced together at the top of the hour. With the high amount of talk on the breakfast show breakfast was kept to a single show mostly tailored to the Christchurch audience, at this time the announcers would call the station ZM.

91ZM Manawatu used a similar system to receive its programming from 91ZM Wellington. In 2000 ZM switched to a single network feed with all networked ZM stations now receiving their programming from Auckland, as a result 96ZM Dunedin and Invercargill now contained the same programming as 91ZM Auckland instead of Christchurch.

=== Closure of 91ZM Christchurch studio ===
In 2000 ZM created a nationwide network with all networked ZM stations receiving their content from Auckland, Christchurch remained a local station for the following year using the tagline "Today's Hit Music for Christchurch". In 2001 more changes were made to ZM which resulted in the closure of the Christchurch studio. The drive show announcer Jason Royal and his producer Jason Wistanley were moved to Auckland to present a nationwide drive show on the ZM network. Local programming was reintroduced in 2005 but was limited to a local daytime show between 10 am and 3 pm and the show was dropped again in 2009.

With the advent of network programming, from 2001 the station was known simply as ZM and localized station id's used the name 91-3ZM.

== Past announcers ==
James Daniels and Ken Ellis were the breakfast hosts for much of the late eighties and until 1992. James and Ken's replacement were Simon Barnett and Phil Gifford (Si and Phil). Si and Phil grew the breakfast audience – ultimately becoming Christchurch's number one rating breakfast show. Si and Phil eventually departed to 92 More FM in 1997. Their replacement was Rik Van Dijk, Katrina Smith and Chuckie Shearer. Unfortunately this show did not rate well enough for the management at ZM to justify keeping on the air when in 2001 a decision was made to close down the Christchurch studios and replace all local programming with networked shows.

- Breakfast 6 am–10 am:
  - 1984–1992: Ken Ellis and James Daniels
  - 1992–1992: Mark Kennedy and Danny Watson (MAD in the Morning)
  - 1992–1997: Simon Barnett and Phil Gifford
  - 1997–1998: Rick Van Dijk, Katrina Smith and Chuckie Shearer
  - 1998–2001: Rick Van Dijk and Katrina Smith
  - 2001 onwards: Networked from Auckland/Wellington
- Daytime 10 am–2 pm:
  - 1990s–1998: Val Robinson
  - 1998–2001: Breffni O'Rourke
  - 2001–2005: Networked from Auckland
  - 2005–2009: Bridget Howard (10 am–3 pm)
  - 2009 onwards: Networked from Auckland
- Drive 2 pm–7 pm:
  - 1980s: Ric Ditchburn
  - 1990-1993: Jeff Sim
  - 1993–1997: Mark Fahey
  - 1997–1998: Jason Royal
  - 1998: Dallas Gurney
  - 1999–2000: Jason Royal
  - 2001 onwards: Networked from Auckland
- Nights:
  - 1980s: Eddie Hribar
  - 1989-1992: Karen Neill
  - 1990s: Christian Boston
  - 1990s–1998: Willy Macalister
  - 1998 onwards: Networked from Auckland

== Studio location ==
Prior the sale of Radio New Zealand's Commercial stations to The Radio Network in 1996, 91ZM, Newstalk ZB and Classic Hits (along with Radio New Zealand and the NZ Sound Archives) were located at Kent House on the corner of Chester Street West and Durham Street North (51 Chester Street West).

The original 3ZM studios were located at 205 Gloucester Street, the building was also used for other Radio New Zealand stations such as National Radio and 3ZB. Following the arrival of television in New Zealand the National Broadcasting Service converted their existing radio studio buildings for television, the building was used as studios for CHTV3 which eventually became TVNZ 1.

In the 1980s TVNZ and Radio New Zealand used a building on Worcester Street located behind the Gloucester Street building to produce many of their TV and radio shows. From the 1990s onwards The Radio Network Christchurch stations were housed in the Worcester Street building. While ZM Christchurch has not produced any local shows since 2009 this building was used for Newstalk ZB Christchurch and Classic Hits 97.7 Christchurch up until the Christchurch earthquake on 22 February 2011. The Radio Network Christchurch never returned to their Worcester Street premises and eventually set up in a new location. The Worcester Street building was taken down in August 2012, in New Zealand's first ever controlled building demolition with explosives.
