= Classic Rock 96FM (Hawkes Bay) =

Former local radio station in Hawke's Bay, New Zealand

- New Zealand
- Broadcast area: Hawke's Bay, New Zealand

Programming
- Format: Classic rock

Ownership
- Owner: Radio New Zealand until 1996; The Radio Network after 1996

History
- First air date: 1977
- Former call signs: 2ZK

Technical information
- Transmitter coordinates: 39°44′23″S 176°50′28″E

Classic Rock 96FM was a radio station in Hawke's Bay, New Zealand that broadcast several different formats and eventually became part of the ZM network, operated by Radio New Zealand, The Radio Network, and New Zealand Media and Entertainment.

== Apple Radio and Concert Programme relay ==
The station was started by Radio New Zealand in 1977 as Apple Radio broadcasting on 730AM. The station was also used to broadcast the Concert Programme into the Hawke's Bay market outside of regular broadcast hours which originally ended at 5pm and later extended to 7pm.

In 1978 after AM band in New Zealand was changed from 10 kHz spacing to 9 kHz spacing, as a result Apple Radio was moved to 765AM.

== 77ZK ==
In 1983 the Concert Programme relay was dropped when the Concert Programme began broadcasting on its own full-time frequency, 91.1FM. At the same time programming was extended to evenings and Apple Radio was rebranded as The All New 77ZK and later Hit Radio 77ZK.

=== Change of format to Adult Contemporary ===
In 1988 77ZK changed format to play a blend of oldies and adult contemporary music and the station was rebranded as Greatest Hits 77ZK.

== Greatest Hits FM96 ==
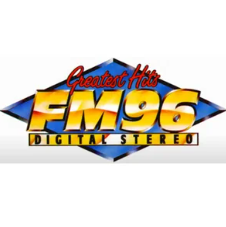
The iconic FM96 logo

On 1 December 1989, Greatest Hits 77ZK made the leap to FM, switching to 95.9FM (from Mt Erin) and rebranding as Greatest Hits FM96. At the same time, a secondary frequency was launched in Wairoa on 99.7FM, and AM broadcasting on 765 was switched off. The move to FM was marked live at 7am during the Breakfast Show - a symbolic moment that ushered in a new era for the station. FM96 quickly built a loyal following among the 40+ audience - listeners who, until then, had no FM station truly catering to their musical tastes. Many had long been faithful Bay City Radio listeners, but hearing their favourite songs delivered with FM clarity proved an irresistible draw. The station’s playlist was broad and carefully balanced, blending 60s, 70s and 80s pop and soft rock with “fresh sounds” from contemporary adult artists of the time, including Toni Childs, Martika, Bryan Adams, Amy Grant, Aaron Neville, Rod Stewart, Aswad and Wilson Phillips. FM96 featured a live weekday Breakfast Show, originally hosted by Cath White and Bazza Ross, with Graeme “Goldie” Goldsborough later stepping in to replace Bazza. Weekend Breakfast duties were handled first by Craig Wilson, followed by Kev Stanton. Outside of Breakfast, the station was fully automated - making FM96 one of the first radio stations in the country to embrace computer automation. The system, known as Systemation, was cutting‑edge for its time: racks of digital cassette decks and 8mm VTRs driven by a Commodore 64. When it worked, it was brilliant. When it didn’t, it could leave the station off air for extended periods - particularly over weekends. FM96 also invested heavily in its sound. A package of incredibly catchy jingles, produced by JAM in the United States, gave the station a bold and polished identity. Combined with a perfectly tuned Optimod 8100 FM processor, the on‑air sound was genuinely market‑leading. You didn’t need to look at the dial - you knew instantly you were listening to FM96.

The station’s afternoon presenter, Bernard Duncan, also served as Programme Director.

FM96 became famous for one of Hawke’s Bay’s most memorable retail promotions - the '69 Cent Dollar'. The station would roll into local stores and hotspots, selling vouchers where listeners paid just 69 cents and walked away with an FM96 69 Cent Dollar - giving them a full $1 of genuine spending power at participating retailers across the region. The idea struck a chord immediately. What started as a clever promotion quickly became a Hawke’s Bay institution. Whenever the 69 Cent Dollars went on sale, listeners showed up in droves, lining up to get their hands on as many as their budget would allow.

Apple Radio, 77ZK and FM96 were all broadcast from their Radio New Zealand owned studios located on the corner of Warren and Eastbourne Streets in Hastings.

== Better Music 96FM ==
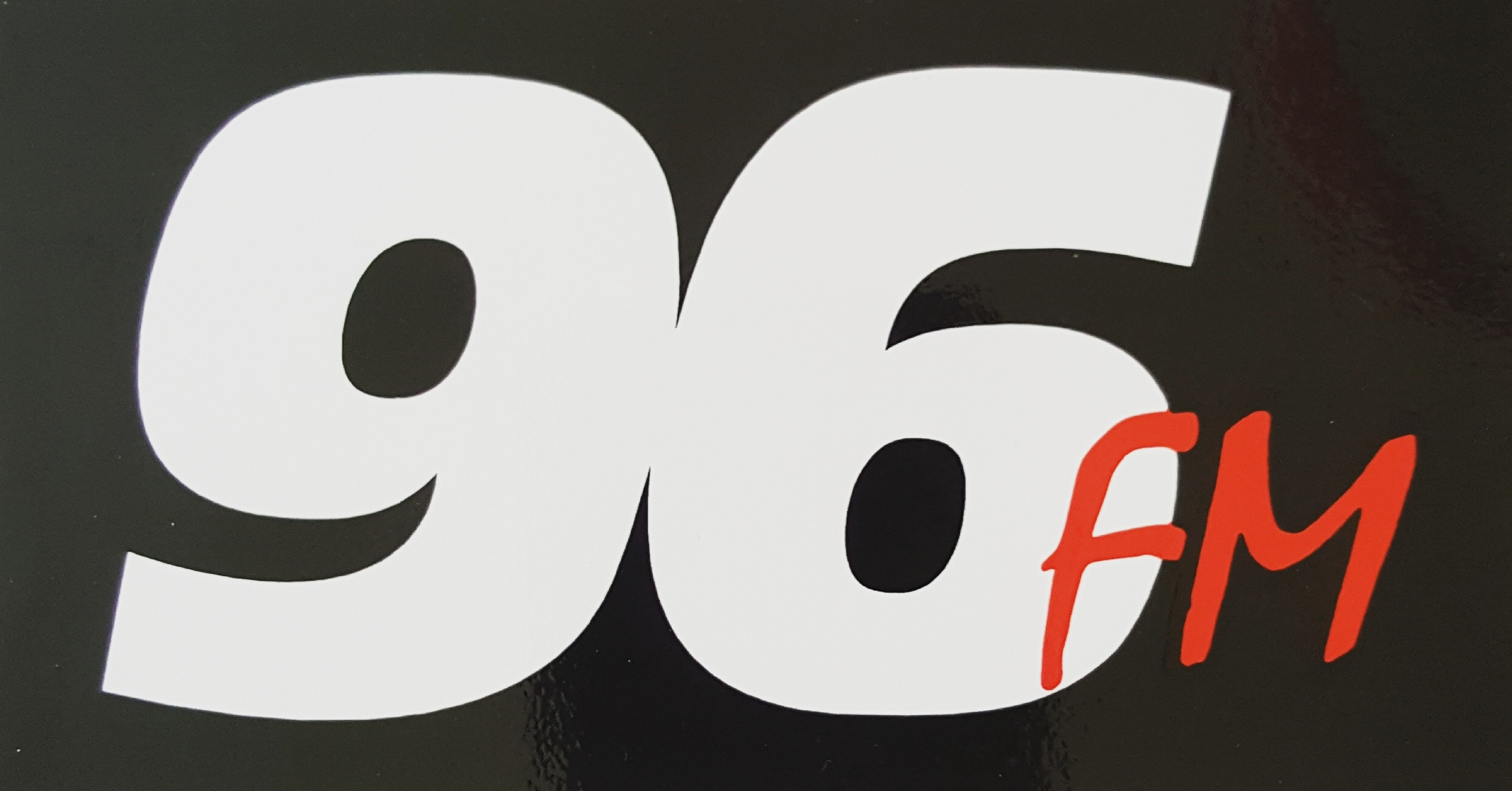
The Better Music 96FM logo from 1992

In February 1992, Greatest Hits FM96 rebranded as Better Music 96FM, marking a clear shift in direction for the station. The playlist moved away from 60s and 70s classics, replacing them with more contemporary tracks aimed at a much younger adult audience. Alongside the music change, Better Music 96FM expanded its live programming beyond weekday breakfast. "Shannon’s High 9 at 9" quickly became a standout evening show - a listener‑driven Top 9 countdown where the audience called in earlier in the night to vote for their favourite new songs, before tuning in at 9pm to hear them counted down. Jane Reid appeared as 'Shannon' on 96FM, while using her real name when reading local news bulletins earlier in the day on Bay City Radio - a deliberate move to avoid any perception of crossing brands, long before networking or station sharing was commonplace. The show became a must‑listen part of the nightly lineup gaining strong popularity with teenagers and the 18–30 demographic.

The station remained largely automated across weekends. The format changes paid off. For the first time in its FM history, Better Music 96FM out‑rated long‑time rival 93FM, which had traditionally dominated the FM ratings.

== Classic Rock 96FM ==
=== Change of format to Classic Rock ===
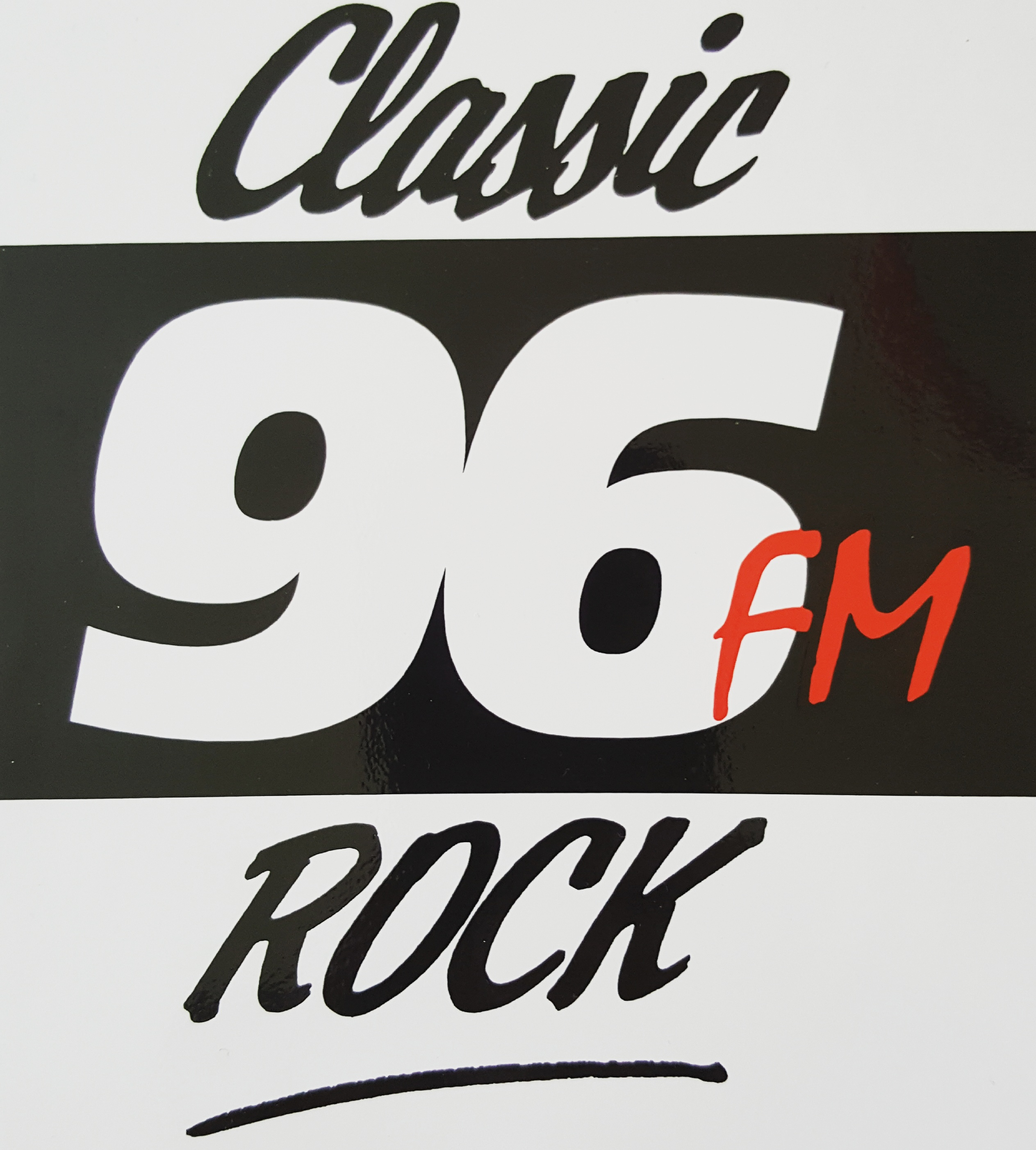
The words Classic Rock were added to the recently established 96FM logo under the 'Better Music' format

In a surprise move, and coming so soon after the successful rebrand from FM96 to 96FM, the station shifted direction again in October 1992. The format was changed to classic rock, and the station was relaunched as Classic Rock 96FM. The transition wasn’t without its challenges. Ratings initially dipped as the former pop‑leaning audience went in search of a new home. However, as the Classic Rock identity bedded in, momentum returned. The format steadily gained traction, and the station once again delivered strong ratings performance. Classic Rock 96FM would prove to be the station’s final name and format before being replaced by Radio Hauraki. Outside of Breakfast, the station operated as fully automated. The station’s imaging was voiced by legendary Channel Nine Australia corporate announcer Steve Britten, lending Classic Rock a commanding and unmistakably professional sound. Systemation was eventually phased out and replaced by two new automation systems: Pristine and Audisk. Pristine was responsible for controlling the station’s newly installed fleet of eighteen 6‑disc Pioneer CD cartridge machines, while Audisk handled commercials, voice‑tracking, and station imaging. Unlike Systemation, Audisk delivered noticeably inferior audio quality. Due to hard‑drive storage limitations, all audio was stored in mono, resulting in a flatter, less dynamic on‑air sound. Despite this compromise, the system remained on air for several years, until Audisk was eventually replaced by Wizard, bringing an end to this era of automation. Classic Rock 96FM eventually relocated to Broadcasting House in Napier, joining Classic Hits 89FM and Newstalk ZB under the same roof.

== Station closure and replacement with Radio Hauraki ==
In 1996 The Radio Network purchased radio company Prospect Media Limited which included several radio station in Auckland including former pirate radio station Radio Hauraki. In July 1998 The Radio Network replaced Classic Rock 96FM with the Auckland-based Radio Hauraki with the station branded as Radio Hauraki 96FM.

== Replacement with 96ZM ==
In March 1999 Radio Hauraki was replaced with the Auckland-based version of ZM branded as 96ZM and during the 2000s branded as 95-9 and 99-7 ZM. Radio Hauraki returned to the Hawke's Bay market in 2000 on 99.9FM.

In December 2010 the 99.7FM Wairoa relay was discontinued and now used to relay Classic Hits 89.5 Hawke's Bay into the Wairoa area.
