= ZM Wellington =

- New Zealand
- Broadcast area: Wellington, New Zealand

Programming
- Format: Hit Music

Ownership
- Owner: New Zealand Media and Entertainment (formerly known as The Radio Network); Radio New Zealand before 1996

History
- First air date: 1969
- Former call signs: 2ZM (1161AM); 2ZZM (90.9FM)

Technical information
- Transmitter coordinates: 41°13′53.29″S 174°46′40.76″E

Links
- Website: zmonline.com

ZM Wellington (previously 2ZM, ZMFM and 91ZM) is a hit music radio station in Wellington, New Zealand. It is a station of the ZM network, and is owned and operated by New Zealand Media and Entertainment.

== History ==
=== Early years ===
The ZM station in Wellington has a history dating back to 1937 as local station 2YD which originally broadcast on 1130AM. The station was started by the New Zealand government owned Radio New Zealand (which at the time was known as the National Broadcasting Board). In 1969, the call sign was changed to 2ZM and in 1973, 2ZM was joined with 1YD and 3ZM in Christchurch to form to youth orientated ZM network, 1YD then became 1ZM.

The first 2ZM breakfast DJ (6 am to 9 am) was Stewart Macpherson, who had just returned from broadcasting in the UK with both the BBC and Radio Luxembourg. Using the show title 'Macphersonland', his innovations included introducing News Bulletins onto the station (despite management opposition), and a weekly published Top 40 chart available at leading music stores. In 1978, 2ZM moved to 1161 kHz after the AM band spacing in New Zealand was adjusted from 10 kHz to 9 kHz.

=== FM broadcasting ===
Wellington's 2ZM was the first ZM station to broadcast on FM from 21 December 1985 as ZMFM 91 (90.9). As the Mount Kaukau transmitter could not cover parts of the Hutt Valley effectively, the station continued to broadcast on AM until 1986, when a second transmitter at Towai (on the Wainuiomata Hill between Seaview and Wainuiomata) was commissioned broadcasting on 93.5 to cover the Hutt Valley. Its AM frequency (1161 kHz) was reallocated to Maori station Te Upoko o Te Ika. During the late eighties ZMFM relocated its studio from Broadcasting House to Alder House (on the corner of Vivian and Victoria streets in Wellington). Slogans used by ZMFM included Hit Radio, ZMFM The Music Leader, Rock of the Nineties ZMFM.

In late 1994, ZMFM Wellington became known as 91ZM sharing the same name that had been used in Christchurch since 1989, and the studios were relocated their current location on the corner of Taranaki and Abel Smith streets in Wellington.

In March 2007, ZM altered its Hutt Valley frequency from 93.5 to 90.9, to form a synchronous transmission with the signal from Mt Kaukau, also on 90.9. This meant that commuters no longer had to switch their radio dials between the two frequencies when driving between Wellington and the Hutt Valley. In June 2008, Easy Mix was networked on ZM's old 93.5 frequency.

=== Privatisation ===
In July 1996, the New Zealand Government sold off the commercial arm of Radio New Zealand, which included, among other things, the ZM stations. The new owner was The Radio Network, a subsidiary of APN News & Media and Clear Channel Communications, which operated as a division of the Australian Radio Network.

=== 90.6ZM Manawatu station ===
ZM originally commenced transmission to Manawatu on 9 March 1987, on 90.6 MHz. The programme was a relay of the Wellington ZMFM station with local commercial breaks and station identification. ZMFM Manawatu also ran its own breakfast show – "Jackson and The Morning Crew" featuring Pete Jackson. In 1989, 90.6 ZMFM re-branded as 2 Double Q (2QQ), subsequently dropping the relay of ZMFM Wellington and beginning a seven-year absence of the ZM name in Manawatu. The ZM brand did not return to the Manawatu market until 1997 when Classic Rock Q91FM (formerly 2 Double Q) reverted to ZM (as 91ZM). The new ZM programme created in 1997 used a computerised automation system to provide a local programme recorded minutes before from the Wellington studio. 96ZM in Dunedin and Invercargill used a similar system to receive their programming from 91ZM Christchurch. In 2000, ZM switched to a single network feed with all networked ZM stations now receiving their programming from Auckland, as a result 91ZM Manawatu now contained the same programming as 91ZM Auckland instead of Wellington.

=== 91.1ZM Kapiti station ===
ZM began broadcasting on its own frequency in the Kapiti region in 2004 with localised advertisement breaks for the Kapiti region. While ZM in Wellington did contain some local programming at this point the Kapiti station took all network programming from Auckland despite the 'Top of the Hour Station id' mentioning the Wellington 90.9FM frequency.

== Past local announcers ==
During the 1980s, announcers Polly Gillespie, Grant Kereama and Nick Tansley joined ZMFM Wellington, and all three announcers were teamed up in 1991, after the departure of Steve Parr, to present the breakfast show. This show was very successful and has been a number 1 rating show in Wellington since the nineties. In 2001, the Wellington breakfast show became the new nationwide breakfast, originally Wellington ran their own local news breaks on the half-hour while the rest of the country used the Auckland-based ZM Newsbeat Service. For the first year the ZM Morning Crew show ran from 6 am to 10 am in Wellington but finished an hour earlier in the rest of New Zealand. This was so Polly, Nick and Grant could present the final hour of their show to a Wellington only audience. Paradoxically, the final hour of their show was always pre-recorded and ran automated.

Outside breakfast programming remained local but between 2003 and 2009, local content was reduced to a point where from 2009 the breakfast show was the only show to come out of Wellington. Wellington did run their own local news service until 2006 when this was replaced with the networked Newsbeat. In April 2014, Polly and Grant moved to The Hits (formerly known as Classic Hits) and ZM launched their new breakfast show produced by Fletch, Vaughan and Megan out of Auckland. Polly and Grant presented their nationwide breakfast show on The Hits from Wellington until they left in 2017, later moving to More FM. As a result, the ZM Wellington studios are no longer used.

- Breakfast 6 am – 10 am:
  - 1969–1972: Stewart Macpherson (show ran 6 am – 9 am)
  - 1982–1984: JR (James Ring) & Anne Marie (St Ledger-Higgens)
  - 1985–1987: Mark MacLeod, Sue Bergin
  - 1987–1990: Steve Parr, Polly Gillespie and Nick Tansley
  - 1991–2003: Nick Tansley – Breakfast co-host on Polly and Grants show
  - 1991–2014: Polly Gillespie and Grant Kereama
  - 2004–2014: Mark Peard (show producer)
  - 2014 onwards: Networked from Auckland
- Daytime 10 am – 3 pm:
  - 1991–1998: Phil Darkins (Also Music Director)
  - 1998–1999: Justin Rae
  - 1999–2003: Aroha Hathaway
  - 2003–2008: Simon O'neil
  - 2008 onwards: Networked from Auckland
- Drive 3 pm – 7 pm:
  - 1992–1998: Sandy Antipas
  - 1998–2003: Julian Burn
  - 2003 onwards: Networked from Auckland
- Nights 7 pm – midnight:
  - 1996–1998: Dallas Gurney
  - 1998 onwards: Networked from Auckland
