= Orban (audio processing) =

International company making audio processors

- Industry: Audio electronics
- Founded: 1967
- Headquarters: San Francisco, California, United States
- Website: www.orban.com

Orban is an international company making audio processors for radio, television and Internet broadcasters. It has been operating since founder Bob Orban sold his first product in 1967. The company was originally based in San Francisco, California.

== History ==
The Orban company started in 1967 when Bob Orban built and sold his first product, a stereo synthesizer, to WOR-FM in New York City, a year before Orban earned his master's degree from Stanford University. He teamed with synthesizer pioneers Bernie Krause and Paul Beaver to promote his products. In 1970, Orban established manufacturing and design in San Francisco. Bob Orban partnered with John Delantoni to form Orban Associates in 1975. The company was bought by Harman International in 1989, and the firm moved to nearby San Leandro in 1991. In 2000, Orban was bought by Circuit Research Labs (CRL) who moved manufacturing to Tempe, Arizona, in 2005, keeping the design team in the San Francisco Bay Area. Orban expanded into Germany in 2006 by purchasing Dialog4 System Engineering in Ludwigsburg. Orban USA acquired the company in 2009, based in Arizona. The Orban company was acquired by Daysequerra in 2016, moving manufacturing to New Jersey. In 2020, Orban Labs consolidated divisions and streamlined operations, with Orban Europe GmbH assuming responsibility for all Orban product sales worldwide.

Over its years of trading, the Orban company has released many well-known audio-processing products, including the Orban Optimod 8000, which was the first audio processor to include FM processing and a stereo generator under one package, an innovative idea at the time, as no other processor took into account 75 μs pre-emphasis curve employed by FM, which leads to low average modulation and many peaks.

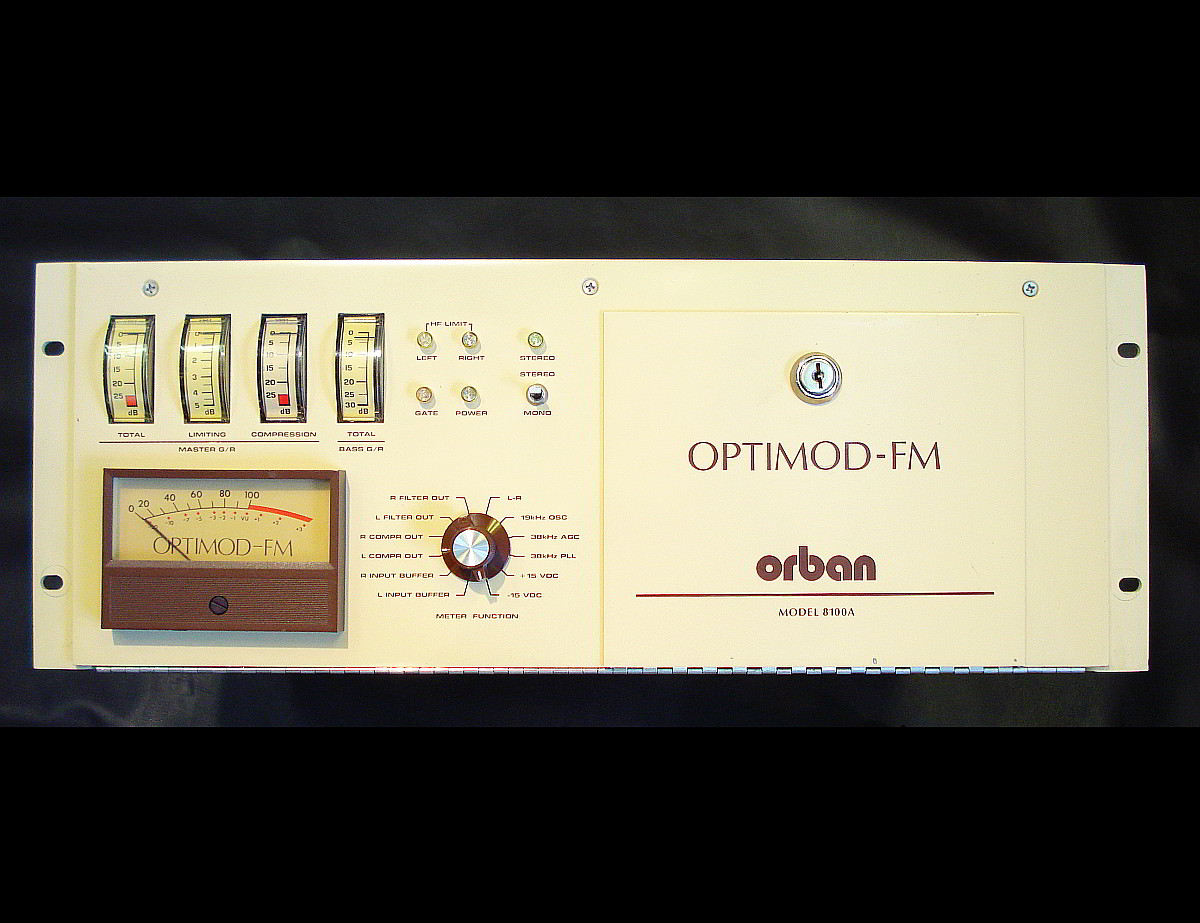
The 8100A Optimod.

This was followed by the Orban Optimod 8100, which went on to become the company's most successful product, and the Orban Optimod 8200, the first successful digital signal processor. It was entirely digital and featured a two-band AGC, followed by five-band or two-band processing, with phase cancellation of clipping distortion. Processors were also made for AM and digital radio as well, including the Orban Optimod 9200 and the Orban Optimod 6200, the first processor made exclusively for digital television, digital radio and Internet radio.

During the 2000s, Orban followed up the 8200 by creating the Orban Optimod 8400 in 2000, the Orban Optimod 8500 in 2005, and the Orban Optimod 8600 in 2010.

== Present day ==
The company's current product line includes its flagship audio processor, the Optimod-FM 5950 Other processors include the Orban Optimod-FM 5750, the Trio, the Optimod PCn1600 for digital, internet and mastering applications and the XPN-AM/ Optimod 9300 for AM radio.
