= 89FM (Auckland) =

New Zealand
- Broadcast area: Auckland, New Zealand
- Frequency: 89.4FM

History
- First air date: 1983

89FM was a local FM radio station in Auckland between 1983 and 1993 and one of the first radio stations to broadcast on FM in both Auckland and New Zealand. The first FM station in New Zealand was Whakatane station, FM 90.7 in January 1982 but this station was only a temporary summer radio station. The other station to start around the same time as 89FM was Magic 91FM in Auckland. The station was originally branded as 89 Stereo FM broadcasting on 89.4FM using the callsign 1ROQ. The station was based in Aetna House at 57 - 59 Symonds Street.

In 1984 the station became part of Triple M and was rebranded as Triple M 89FM using the same logo and station imaging as the Triple M stations in Australia, all programming remained local, at the same time the stations callsign was changed to 1MMM. In 1988 the station dropped the Triple M branding and became 89FM. Station branding included Auckland's Music Leader and in 1991 The All New 89FM.

In 1991 the station changed format to a Rock format was rebranded as 89Rock and in 1992 was once again changed to become 89X. In 1992 the station was sold to Radio New Zealand.

On 10 February 1993 Radio New Zealand closed down 89X and used the frequency to broadcast Newstalk ZB on FM in Auckland as well as the existing AM frequency that Newstalk ZB was broadcasting on.

== Breakfast show ==
In the late 1980s the stations breakfast show was presented by Mark Kennedy and Mark Staufer and was known as The Top Marks. The show was a top rating breakfast during its run. Both Kennedy and Staufer both went separate directions but in 2014 were reunited when they began presenting the breakfast show on nationwide radio station The Sound. Unfortunately the reunion was short lived, after just 5 weeks on the air the duo were taken off the air.
