= CIDC =

CIDC may refer to:

- CIDC-FM, a radio station in Ontario
- Coney Island Development Corporation, New York
- United States Army Criminal Investigation Command
