= Phil Gifford =

New Zealand writer and broadcaster (1947–2026)

Phil Gifford ONZM
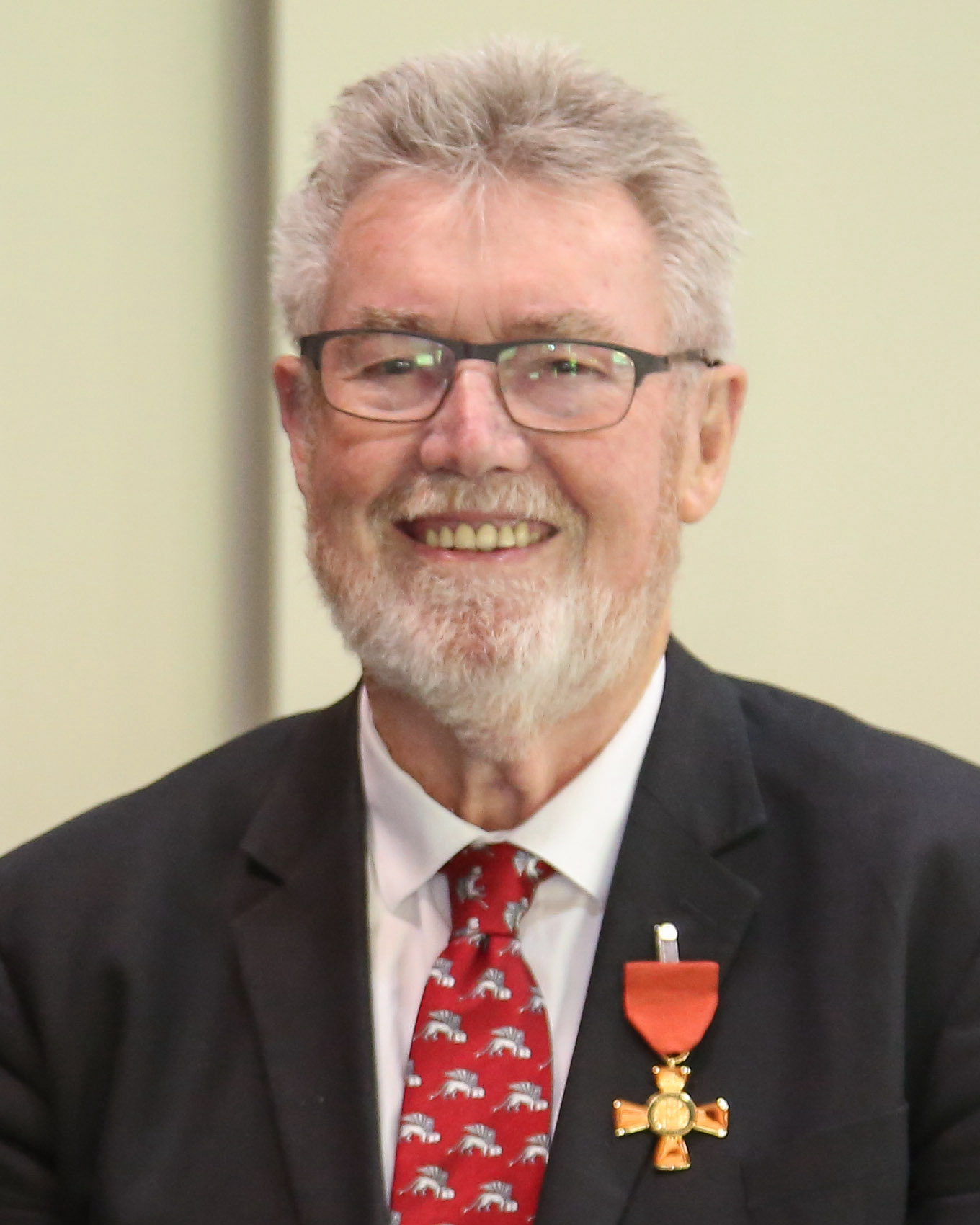
- Gifford in 2024
- Born: Philip Douglas Gifford; 1947; Hamilton, New Zealand
- Died: 29 September 2026 (aged 79); Auckland, New Zealand
- Presenting career
- Station: Newstalk ZB
- Time slot: Weekday Afternoons
- Country: New Zealand

Philip Douglas Gifford ONZM (1947 – 29 September 2026) was a New Zealand sportswriter and broadcaster. He had his own rugby radio show Front Row on Radio Sport from 8 to 10am on Saturdays. He wrote a weekly column in the country's highest circulation weekend paper, The Sunday Star-Times, and was a contributing editor to North & South magazine. He created the satirical rugby character Loosehead Len in 1973, and has seven books under that name.

Gifford wrote rugby best-sellers including his book on Alex Wyllie, Grizz, The Legend (1991, ISBN 0908630360), which has sold 30,000 copies, making it the biggest-selling New Zealand sports book of the 1990s. He co-hosted a top rating breakfast show with Simon Barnett. Barnett and Gifford hosted the breakfast show on 91ZM Christchurch between 1992 and 1997 before being enticed to work on opposition station 92 More FM for a large sum of money. Gifford continued to co-host breakfast on More FM, Christchurch until 2003 when he moved to Radio Sport. 91ZM Christchurch was a top rating station in Christchurch when he and Barnett hosted breakfast and More FM Christchurch enjoyed the top rating spot in the years following this. In 2019, Gifford rejoined Simon Barnett on Newstalk ZB Weekday Afternoons until mid-2021.

In 2002, he won a celebrity special of The Weakest Link raising $9600 for a nominated charity.

He wrote a music column for Auckland magazine North & South.

In the 2024 New Year Honours, Gifford was appointed an Officer of the New Zealand Order of Merit, for services to broadcasting and sports journalism.

Gifford died in Auckland on 29 September 2026, at the age of 79.
