= Simon Barnett =

New Zealand broadcaster (born 1967)

- Born: Simon Andrew Barnett; 23 March 1967 (age 59); Ashburton, New Zealand
- Presenting career
- Station: More FM
- Time slot: Breakfast Show
- Style: Program Host
- Country: New Zealand
- Website: More FM Canterbury

Simon Barnett (born 23 March 1967) is a radio and television host and presenter in New Zealand.

== Career ==
Barnett hosted Clash of the Codes, a television programme in the 1990s where sportspeople participated in various physical challenges. He presented a similar show in 2018 called XVenture Family Challenge.

Barnett co-hosted the morning show on Christchurch radio station 92 More FM with Gary McCormick until 2018, and previously with Phil Gifford. He has hosted a breakfast slot on 91ZM, worked for Radio Nelson and has acted, appearing in a New Zealand feature film Ruby and Rata (1990). Barnett also won the 2015 series of the New Zealand version of Dancing with The Stars.

Barnett was a host on the children's TV programme What Now? from 1988 to 1992. He hosted the New Zealand version of the UK musical talent show, Stars in Their Eyes from 2008 to 2009. He was the host of the 2013 series of Mitre 10 Dream Home in the post-earthquake town of Kaiapoi, Canterbury.

In 2019, Simon Barnett joined Newstalk ZB in Christchurch but shifted back to More FM in January 2025, saying "for me it [is] like walking in the front door of the family home after doing my OE for a few years".

== Personal life ==
Barnett was born in Ashburton, near Christchurch in Canterbury, attending Ashburton College from 1980 and graduating in 1984, when he was Head Boy.

He was married since 1991, to wife Jodi, with whom he had four daughters. In October 2023, Jodi died of brain cancer. She had suffered from seizures, which prompted Barnett to leave his role as Christchurch More FM's breakfast show host.

He opposed the Child Discipline Bill proposed in the New Zealand Parliament, supporting the "Vote NO" campaign in the 2009 corporal punishment referendum.

== See also ==
- List of New Zealand television personalities
