= 91FM (Auckland) =

Magic 91FM
- New Zealand
- Broadcast area: Auckland, New Zealand
- Frequency: 91.0 FM

Programming
- Format: Hit Music

History
- First air date: 1983

91FM (originally known as Magic 91FM) was a local radio station in Auckland. 91FM began broadcasting on 91.0 FM using the call sign 1MJK in 1983 and was one of the first FM stations to start in Auckland and New Zealand, along with 89 Stereo FM. 91FM played Hit Music format similar to that of ZM and in the early nineties actually used the same "Rock of the Nineties" slogan used by 91ZM in Christchurch and ZMFM in Wellington.

In 1993 91FM changed format and became The Breeze on 91FM; also at the same time Kiwi FM in Waikato and Radio Windy in Wellington were all renamed to The Breeze but all three stations operated separately. 91FM had several owners during its run and in the mid-nineties was sold to Prospect Media who also owned Radio Hauraki and Easy Listening i98FM as well as several other stations. In 1996 Prospect Media was purchased by The Radio Network. During 1997 The Radio Network made several changes to their radio stations in Auckland and Hamilton, and as a result The Breeze on 91.0 FM and also The Breeze on 89.8 FM in Hamilton ceased operating and The Radio Network used these frequencies to start ZM in Auckland and Hamilton. The Breeze station in Wellington was not owned by Prospect Media or The Radio Network so was not affected by this change. In 2006 The Breeze, now owned by Mediaworks New Zealand made a return to Auckland as an Easy Listening station.
