= ZM (radio station) =

New Zealand rhythmic CHR network

- New Zealand
- Broadcast area: 31 markets

Programming
- Format: Rhythmic CHR

Ownership
- Owner: New Zealand Media and Entertainment

History
- First air date: c.1973; 53 years ago

Links
- Webcast: iheart.com/live/ZM-6190/
- Website: zmonline.com

ZM (/ˈzɛdɛm/ ZED-em) is a New Zealand rhythmic contemporary hit radio network owned by New Zealand Media and Entertainment. It broadcasts to 31 markets throughout mainland New Zealand via terrestrial FM, and worldwide via the Internet. The network targets the 18–39 demographic specialises in a chart-music playlist of pop, rock, hip hop, country and dance music. It reaches approximately 480,300 listeners weekly, making it the fifth largest commercial radio station in New Zealand.

The ZM network was founded in the early 1970s as three separate commercial music stations owned by Radio New Zealand in Auckland, Wellington and Christchurch. The name is derived from the former callsigns of the stations: 1ZM, 2ZM and 3ZM. The stations were transferred to The Radio Network (now merged into New Zealand Media and Entertainment) in 1996, and ZM expanded across the country, initially as three separate networks before merging to form one nationwide network in 2000.

The network's head office and main studios are based in Auckland, where all of the programming is produced.

== Current line-up ==
=== Breakfast ===
ZM's Fletch, Vaughan & Hayley, hosted by Carl 'Fletch' Fletcher, Vaughan Smith and Hayley Sproull.

=== Workday ===
ZM's Jam Packed Workday, hosted by Brooke Koppens.

=== Afternoon Drive ===
ZM's Bree & Clint, hosted by Bree Tomasel & Clint Roberts.

=== Nights ===
ZM's Late Show, hosted by Shannon Trim.

== ZM History ==
=== Early years ===
- ZM in its current format was first started in 1973 by the government owned New Zealand Broadcasting Corporation (which became Radio New Zealand in 1975). The three original ZM stations were based in Auckland, Wellington and Christchurch and had been on air for the past few decades, most recently as 1YD, 2YD and 3ZM in their respective markets.
- The three original stations were known by their ZM call signs: 1ZM in Auckland on 1250AM, 2ZM in Wellington on 1130AM and 3ZM in Christchurch on 1400AM.
- In 1978, the AM frequency step in New Zealand was changed from a 10 kHz step to a 9 kHz step. As a result, all three stations changed frequencies: 1ZM moved to 1251 kHz, 2ZM Wellington moved to 1161 kHz (sometimes branded as 1162ZM), and 3ZM Christchurch moved to 1323 kHz.

=== 1980s: AM to FM transition ===
- In 1981, Radio New Zealand stations were finally granted the right to broadcast 24 hours per day, previously only the domain of private operators. Overnight networked programming was introduced with the ZM All-Nighter show, produced from the 1ZM studios in Auckland and networked to 2ZM Wellington and 3ZM Christchurch. 2ZK in Hawkes Bay and 4ZG in Gore also took the ZM All-Nighter.
- In 1982, 1ZM Auckland lost its bid for an FM licence. With the Broadcasting Tribunal allowing two new private radio stations (Magic 91FM and 89 Stereo FM) into the Auckland market, 1ZM was required to reformat and adopt a 'Limited Sponsorship' model. This was an attempt to assist the new operators in establishing a revenue base, but it resulted in significant drops in both financial and audience market share for 1ZM.
- By 1987, a decision was made to change the format of 1ZM Auckland from a Contemporary Hit Radio format to a Classic Hits format. The Auckland station was rebranded as Classic Hits Twelve 51, marking the birth of the Classic Hits brand which would later be rolled out across New Zealand.
- In 1985, 2ZM Wellington switched to FM broadcasting on 90.9FM, and in 1986 Christchurch also made the move to FM broadcasting on 91.3FM. Following these changes, both stations rebranded to become Hit Radio ZMFM.
- In 1987, a ZMFM station was established in Palmerston North on 90.6FM with a local breakfast show, but all programming outside breakfast was networked from Wellington. This station became a local station in 1989 branded as 2QQ.
- In 1989, ZMFM Christchurch became known as 91 Stereo ZM and later 91ZM, while Auckland's Classic Hits Twelve 51 was finally given a licence to broadcast on FM as Classic Hits 97FM.

=== 1990s: Privatisation and Expansion ===
- Both 91ZM Christchurch and ZMFM Wellington used the slogan "Rock of the Nineties" during the early 1990s. In late 1994, ZMFM Wellington was rebranded to 91ZM using the same logo as 91ZM Christchurch. Both stations changed their slogan to "Just Great Music of the 80s and 90s".
- In 1997, ZM changed their logo on all stations to include a green globe behind the station name and adopted the slogan Today's Hit Music, reflecting the modern music played on the station. This slogan was used until 2014.
- A significant change came in July 1996 when the New Zealand Government sold off the commercial arm of Radio New Zealand, including the ZM stations. The new owner was The Radio Network, a subsidiary of APN News & Media and Clear Channel Communications.
- ZM rapidly expanded during this period. A new ZM station was established in Northland in 1995 as 93ZM. The first fully networked ZM station was established in Dunedin in 1996 as 96ZM, networked from 91ZM studios in Christchurch using an automated computer system allowing announcers to produce localised voice breaks for different markets.
- In 1997, programming was extended to Invercargill on 95.6FM as 96ZM, and ZM returned to Palmerston North on 90.6FM. After The Radio Network purchased assets of Prospect Media (including Radio Hauraki and Easy Listening i), new local ZM stations were started in Auckland on 91.0FM and Hamilton on 89.8FM.
- Further expansion continued with programming extended to Rotorua in 1998 as 98ZM (replacing local station Classic Rock 98.3FM), a new station in Taranaki as 98.8ZM, and into Hawkes Bay in 1999 on the former Radio Hauraki 95.9FM frequency.
- Nationwide networked programming was introduced in 1997, first with the ZM Essential 30 Countdown on Saturday afternoons, followed by the ZM Club Mix on Saturday nights and a nationwide night show on weeknights in 1998.

=== 2000s: Unified network ===
- By 2000, ZM was broadcasting in multiple regions with programming networked from three main centers: Invercargill and Dunedin from Christchurch, Palmerston North from Wellington, and a northern network with Hawkes Bay, Rotorua, Taranaki, Waikato and Northland all receiving networked programming from Auckland.
- In 2000, ZM changed to a single network format based from Auckland. All ZM stations in smaller regions became part of this network, with only Christchurch and Wellington initially remaining local except during evenings and overnight. Voice breaks that were previously prerecorded for each region were replaced with live voice breaks tailored to a nationwide audience.
- The original nationwide network lineup consisted of Marcus Lush on breakfast with The Marcus Lush breakfast show, Nicki Sunderland and Lana Coc-Kroft presenting the daytime show, Mike McClung and Tim Homer presenting drive, and Geoff Stagg on nights.
- In 2001, Christchurch and Wellington were fully integrated into the network. The Christchurch studio was closed with some announcers relocated to Auckland, while Wellington ZM's local breakfast announcers Polly Gillespie, Nick Tansley and Grant Kareama became the hosts of a new nationwide breakfast show still presented from Wellington.
- In 2003, more changes were made to the announcer lineup with shock jock Iain Stables hired to present the ZM drive show. The Christchurch studio briefly reopened in 2005 for local daytime programming but was closed again by 2009. The Wellington studio remained until 2014 as it housed the nationwide ZM Morning Crew.
- Throughout the decade, ZM continued to expand with new stations including ZM Gisborne (2002), ZM Wanganui (2004), ZM South Canterbury (2004), ZM Blenheim (2007), and ZM Wairarapa (2010).

=== 2010s to present: Digital expansion and lineup changes ===
In April 2014, long-standing breakfast hosts Polly Gillespie & Grant Kereama departed after over 20 years in Wellington and 13 years nationally. They were replaced by Carl "Fletch" Fletcher, Vaughan Smith & Megan Papas, who moved from rival station The Edge.

Other significant lineup changes followed:

- Jay and Flynny finished their show in December 2014, replaced by Jase & PJ.
- The Night Show with Guy and Georgia was replaced by The ZM Snapchart with Cam Mansel in December 2016.
- Jase & PJ departed the drive show in 2017, replaced by Bree & Clint in July 2018
- Comedian Hayley Sproull temporarily replaced Megan Papas during her maternity leave in 2020, later becoming a permanent host in 2022 when Papas moved to The Hits.
- In 2021, ZM rebranded its night show to "ZM's Late Show," still presented by Cam Mansel.
- In late 2024, newcomer Brooke Koppens took over as host of "ZM's Late Show"

Meanwhile, ZM expanded its digital presence:

- In December 2010, ZM launched an online stream as ZMonline, becoming the 20th ZM station to join the network with its own imaging and commercial options.
- The station introduced an iPhone app in 2011, followed by an Android app, which was later replaced by iHeartRadio after its New Zealand launch in August 2013.
- ZM continued its expansion with new stations in Taupo (2013), Queenstown (2014), West Coast (2020), and Coromandel (2021).

== Frequencies ==
=== North Island ===
- ZM Whangarei - Northland 94.8 MHz
- ZM Auckland - Auckland 91.0 MHz
- ZM Waikato - Hamilton 89.8 MHz
- Waihi - 96.4 MHz
- Waihi Beach - 99.4 MHz
- Coromandel - 96.4 MHz, 99.1 MHz
- Thames - 88.0 MHz
- Paeroa - 88.0 MHz
- Tauranga - 89.4 MHz
- Rotorua - 98.3 MHz
- Taupō - 90.4 MHz
- Gisborne - 107.4 MHz, 107.7 MHz
- Hawke's Bay - 95.9 MHz
- Taranaki - 98.8 MHz
- Whanganui - 96.8 MHz
- Manawatu - 90.6 MHz
- Kāpiti Coast and Horowhenua - 91.1 MHz
- Wairarapa - 94.3 MHz
- ZM Wellington - Wellington and Hutt Valley - 90.9 MHz

=== South Island ===
- Nelson - 96.8 MHz
- Marlborough - 90.5 MHz
- Westport - 91.7 MHz
- Greymouth - 89.9 MHz
- ZM Christchurch - Christchurch - 91.3 MHz, Sumner - 90.9 MHz
- Timaru - 96.3 MHz
- Dunedin - 88.6 MHz
- Queenstown - 88.8 MHz
- Wānaka - 100.2 MHz
- Invercargill - 95.6 MHz

=== ZM Online Stream ===
In early December 2010, ZM relaunched its online stream as a new station, rather than relaying an existing station as it had done previously. This gave ZMonline its own imaging & commercial options.

As of 2025, ZM is also available through the iHeartRadio platform with dedicated iHeart stations for the ZM network as a whole, as well as location-specific stations for Auckland, Waikato, Wellington, and Christchurch. This expansion provides listeners with more options to access ZM content tailored to their specific region.

=== ZM News Service ===
Like most radio stations in New Zealand, ZM originally featured news on the hour every hour, initially provided by the Radio New Zealand News Service, later becoming The Radio Network News Service. In 1997, ZM stations began reducing news breaks to only play during the breakfast show, reflecting a trend of increasing music and reducing talk time.

The current news service provides news reports and local weather updates from the Auckland studio for each individual region. The bulletins are sourced from the NZME newsroom (Newstalk ZB & NZ Herald).

Timesaver Traffic reports are read out for larger regions including Auckland, Wellington, Christchurch, Hamilton, Tauranga, and Dunedin. Ten-second weather updates are read out on weekdays before the Newsfeed updates, with individual weather reports pre-recorded for each region.

Current weekday news presenters include Brin Rudkin and Pixie Cockerill. Former presenters include Raylene Ramsay, Glen Stuart, Bridget Hastie, Debbie Griffiths, Dan Bernstone, Ash Thomas, Adam Cooper, Paul Stenhouse, Jacob Brown, Rachel Jackson-Lees, Lee Plummer and Sam Worthington.

== ZM in the New Zealand Radio Awards ==
ZM has won the following awards at the New Zealand Radio Awards:

=== 2002 ===
- Air Personality of the Year – Non-Breakfast: Nicki Sunderland (Personality), Lana Coc-Kroft (Co-Host) – ZM Network

=== 2006 ===
- Best New Broadcaster: Sarah Gandy – ZM Network
- Best Promotional or Image Trailer for a Radio Station: One Hit Wonder - U2 – Chris Nicoll – ZM Network
- Commercial or Trailers: One Hit Wonder, U2 – Chris Nicoll – ZM.
- Station Imaging: ZM Network Imaging – Chris Nicoll – ZM (Joint Winner)

=== 2007 ===
- Best Music Breakfast Host or Hosts - Metropolitan: The ZM Morning Crew – ZM Network
- Best Non-Breakfast Host or Hosts - Metropolitan: Stables – ZM Network
- Best Promotion of a Radio Station – Networks: Live Rent Free – Christian Boston & Kate McGowan – ZM Network
- Best Promotional or Image Trailer for a Radio Station: Carrot Fest – Chris Nicoll – ZM
- Client Promotion: Telecom 3 Minute Hour – Leanne Hutchinson – ZM Network

=== 2008 ===
- Programmer of the Year: Christian Boston – ZM Network.
- Best Client Promotion: 0800 New Cops – Leanne Hutchinson & Cam Bisley – ZM
- Best Promotional Trailer: Live Rent Free – Chris Nicoll – ZM

=== 2009 ===
- Best Programmer of the Year: Christian Boston – ZM Network.
- Best Promotional Trailer: The Timbaland Trip – Chris Nicoll & Georgia Cubbon – ZM Network
- Station Imaging: Chris Nicoll – ZM Network Imaging, ZM Network

=== 2010 ===
- Best Programmer of the Year: Christian Boston – ZM Network
- Station Imaging: ZM Network Imaging – Chris Nicoll & Kieran Bell – ZM Network
- Best New Broadcaster - Technical: Kieran Bell – ZM Network

=== 2011 ===
- Station Imaging: Kieran Bell & Christian Boston – ZM Network

=== 2012 ===
- Best Promotion: Top 100 of 2011 – Kieran Bell – ZM Network

=== 2013 ===
- Best Promotional Trailer: ZM Free Fuel Summer – Kieran Bell – ZM Network
- Station Imaging: Kieran Bell – ZM Network

=== 2014 ===
- Best Agency Client Campaign: Telecom Free WiFi Summer – Sarah Catran, Michaela Pickworth, Charlotte Cubitt – ZM, Network, The Radio Network.
- Best New Broadcaster - Promotions: Dan Peek – ZM – ZM Network
- One-Off Community Campaign: ZM's Break & Enter Christmas – Anna Strachan, Dan Peek, Amy Nola, Polly Gillespie, Grant Kereama, Marc Peard, Paul Flynn, Matt Anderson, Kate Britten, Sarah Gandy – ZM Network
- Overall Best New Broadcaster: Dan Peek – ZM – ZM Network

=== 2015 ===
- Best Marketing Campaign: Join The Movement – Fletch, Vaughan and Megan, Jodie Marinkovich, Tracey Fox, John Galliers – ZM Network
- Best New Broadcaster - Off-Air: Lucy Carthew, Online Producer - ZM Network

=== 2016 ===
- Best Promotional Trailer: ZM's Radioke - Maroon 5 in Tokyo – Kieran Bell – ZM Network

=== 2017 ===
- Station of the Year - Network: ZM Network
- Best Station Trailer: Justin Bieber Campaign – Alistair Cockburn, Gary Pointon, Abi Banks, Dan Bernstone, Caitlin Marett
- Best Client Digital/Social Promotion: ZM and Friskies Cat News – Carl "Fletch" Fletcher, Cameron Maurice, Sarah Catran, Vaughan Smith, Megan Sellers

=== 2018 ===
- Best Music Breakfast Show - Network: ZM's Fletch, Vaughan & Megan – Carl "Fletch" Fletcher, Vaughan Smith, Megan Papas, Caitlin Marett, James Johnston, Anna Henvest
- Best Network Station Promotion: Flochella
- Best Digital Content: www.zmonline.com – Lucy Carthew, Ellie Harwood, Trinette Sands, Sarah Mount
- Best Marketing Campaign: ZM's $50,000 Secret Sound – Justine Black, Fiona Kerr, Ashleigh Van Graan, Alistair Cockburn
- Best Station Trailer: ZM's Secret Sound – Alistair Cockburn
- Best Video: Lorde - The Babysitter – Vaughan Smith, Indie Smith, August Smith, Ella Yelich-O'Connor, Travis Hughes

=== 2019 ===
- Station of the Year - Network: ZM Network
- Best Music Breakfast Show - Network: ZM's Fletch, Vaughan & Megan - Carl "Fletch" Fletcher, Vaughan Smith, Megan Papas, Caitlin Marett, James Johnston, Anna Henvest
- "The Blackie Award' - Fletch Vaughan Meghan's Final Conversion - Carl "Fletch" Fletcher, Vaughan Smith, Megan Papas, Caitlin Marett, James Johnston, Anna Henvest
- Best Marketing Campaign - Friday Jams LIVE - Jacqui Robins, Emily Hancox, Ross Flahive, Dannii Gardiner, Ashleigh Van Graan
- Best Network Station Promotion - ZM's Secret Sound - ZM Network Team
- Best Station Imaging - Alistair Cockburn
- Best Station Trailer - Alistair Cockburn
- Best New Broadcaster - On Air: Anna Henvest – ZM News / Announcer
- Best Client Promotion/Activation - Single Market: Fletch, Vaughan & Megan's Car Raffle - Ruby Bain, Mary Outram, Jimmy Farrant, Caitlin Marett, Anna Henvest, James Johnston, Carl "Fletch" Fletcher, Vaughan Smith, Megan Papas, Jordyn Mihell

=== 2020 ===
- Best Breakfast Show - Music Network: ZM's Fletch, Vaughan & Megan – Carl "Fletch" Fletcher, Vaughan Smith, Megan Papas, Caitlin Marett, James Johnston, Anna Henvest
- Best Client Promotion/Activation: ZM's Float with Tip Top Trumpet
- Best Show Producer - Music Show: ZM's Bree & Clint – Ben McDowell, Ellie Harwood
- Best Station Imaging: Alistair Cockburn, Brynee Wilson
- Best Station Trailer: ZM's Bonus Banger – Alistair Cockburn, Claire Chellew, Dan Bernstone
- Associated Craft Award: Harry Pali

=== 2021 ===
- Best Breakfast Show - Music Network: ZM's Fletch, Vaughan & Megan – Carl "Fletch" Fletcher, Vaughan Smith, Megan Papas, Anna Henvest, Sarah Mount, Jared Pickstock
- Best Station Imaging: Alistair Cockburn, Brynee Wilson
- Best Station Trailer: ZM's $100k Secret Sound – Alistair Cockburn, Claire Chellew, Richie Simpson, Tom Harper, Gary Pointon

=== 2022 ===
- Best Network Team Show: ZM's Fletch, Vaughan & Megan – Carl "Fletch" Fletcher, Vaughan Smith, Megan Papas, Anna Henvest, Sarah Mount, Jared Pickstock, Carwen Jones, Hayley Sproull
- The Blackie: Hayley's Driver's Licence – Hayley Sproull
- Best Digital Content: ZM Online – Megan Sagar, Carwen Jones, Sarah Mount, Rowan Naude, Ella Shepherd, Gary Pointon
- Best Network Station Promotion: The Box – Alistair Cockburn, Gary Pointon
- Best Show Producer or Producing Team - Music Show: Ben McDowell, Anastasia Loeffen – ZM's Bree & Clint
- Best Station Imaging: Alistair Cockburn, Brynee Wilson, Sam Harvey, Zoe Norton
- Best Station Trailer: ZM's Add to Cart – Alistair Cockburn, Tom Harper, Sarah Accorsi, Claire Chellew

=== 2023 ===
- Best Music Network Breakfast Show: ZM's Fletch, Vaughan & Hayley – Carl "Fletch" Fletcher, Vaughan Smith, Hayley Sproull, Anna Henvest, Carwen Jones, Jared Pickstock

=== 2024 ===
- Best Music Network Breakfast Show: ZM's Fletch, Vaughan & Hayley – Carl "Fletch" Fletcher, Vaughan Smith, Hayley Sproull, Carwen Jones, Jared Pickstock, Shannon Trim
- Best Network Station Promotion: ZM's Girl Math – Carwen Jones, Shannon Trim, Lucy Wymer, Hayley Sproull, Jared Pickstock, Carl "Fletch" Fletcher, Vaughan Smith
- The Blackie: ZM's Girl Math – Carl "Fletch" Fletcher, Vaughan Smith, Hayley Sproull, Carwen Jones, Jared Pickstock, Shannon Trim
- Best Digital Content: ZM Online – Megan Sagar, Kaitlyn Bolton
- Best Health & Wellbeing Podcast: Sex.Life – Morgan Penn, Hayley Sproull, Helen King, Sarah Catran, Lauren Simpkins, Kaitlyn Bolton, Adam Pomana
- Best Marketing Campaign: Sex.Life Podcast – Jacqui Davis, Jennifer Pryor, Kelly Gunn, Morgan Penn

=== 2025 ===
- Best Music Network Breakfast Show: ZM's Fletch, Vaughan & Hayley – Carl "Fletch" Fletcher, Vaughan Smith, Hayley Sproull, Carwen Jones, Shannon Trim, Jared Pickstock
- Best Digital Content: ZM Online – Kaitlyn Bolton, Megan Sagar, Pixie Cockerill, Chen Wang, Ana Diaz-Emerson, Shannon Trim, Ella Shepherd
- Best New Talent - Off-Air: Pixie Cockerill
- Best New Talent - Presenter: Jazz Thornton
- Best Station Imaging: Sam Harvey, Pixie Cockerill, Gary Pointon
- Best Station Trailer: ZM's Human Shazam - Sam Harvey, Pixie Cockerill
- Best Client Promotion/Activation: ANZ Donation Station
- Best Health & Wellbeing Podcast: Sex.Life – Morgan Penn, Hayley Sproull, Helen King, Evan Paea, Sarah Catran, Lauren Simpkins

== Slogans ==
ZM has used the following slogans in the past:

c1985–c1988:

- Hit Radio ZMFM (Wellington, Christchurch and Manawatu)

c1988–c1988:

- More Music ZMFM (Manawatu only)

c1988–c1990:

- The Music Leader ZMFM (Wellington and Manawatu only)

c1988–c1990:

- 91 Stereo ZM (Christchurch only)

1991–1994:

- Rock of the Nineties ZMFM (Wellington only)

1991–1994:

- Rock of the Nineties 91ZM (Christchurch only)

1994–1997:

- Just Great Music of the '80s and '90s

1997–2014:

- Today's Hit Music

2014:

- Fletch, Vaughan and Megan & Hot Tunes or NZ's Hit Music

2015:

- ZM Is My Station!

2016–2022:

- Hit Music Lives Here

2020–present:

- Play ZM

== Ratings ==
As of May 2025, ZM has the ninth-highest share of the New Zealand commercial radio market at 5.5%. It has the third-highest share of NZME stations, behind Newstalk ZB and The Hits.

ZM commercial radio ratings (May 2025)
Market	Station share	Change	Rank
All markets	5.4	▼ −0.1	9
Auckland	3.6	▼ −0.1	11
Christchurch	6.1	▼ −0.5	8
Wellington	8.3	▲ +0.8	3
Waikato	9.9	▼ −1.3	3
Tauranga	7.5	▼ −0.4	5
Manawatū	6.0	▼ −0.6	9
Hawke's Bay	4.5	▼ −1.2	10
Northland	2.1	▼ −0.6	13
Dunedin	4.3	▼ −0.3	10
Taranaki	5.4	▲ +0.7	9
Nelson	3.1	▲ +0.1	10
Southland	6.4	▲ +0.9	6
Rotorua	3.0	▲ +0.3	13

== Controversy ==
=== Broadcasting standards breaches ===
In September 2024, the Broadcasting Standards Authority upheld a complaint against ZM for a segment aired on the Fletch, Vaughan and Hayley show that was found to irresponsibly promote excessive alcohol consumption. The segment on 15 March 2024, which discussed seeking the cheapest alcohol with the highest alcohol content, was deemed to breach broadcasting standards on promoting illegal or antisocial behaviour. While the broadcaster NZME acknowledged the breach and removed the content from online platforms, the Authority ruled that these actions were insufficient and ordered ZM to broadcast a public statement acknowledging the breach to its audience.
