= ZM Auckland =

New Zealand
- Broadcast area: Auckland, New Zealand
- Frequency: 91.0 MHz

Programming
- Format: Hit Music

Ownership
- Owner: New Zealand Media and Entertainment

History
- First air date: 1997

Technical information
- Transmitter coordinates: 36.8484°S 174.7621°E

Links
- Website: zmonline.com

ZM Auckland is a hit music radio station in Auckland, New Zealand. The station is the host of the ZM network, and is owned and operated by New Zealand Media and Entertainment.

Several stations have been set up since 2002 to carry ZM programmes from Auckland with local advertisements – ZM Gisborne in 2002, ZM Wanganui in 2004, ZM South Canterbury in September 2004, ZM Blenheim in January 2007, ZM Wairarapa in 2010, ZM Taupo in 2013, ZM Queenstown in 2014, ZM Wanaka in May 2016, ZM West Coast in July 2020 and ZM Coromandel in December 2021.

== History ==
ZM was first started by the government-owned Radio New Zealand as three separate AM radio stations in Auckland (1ZM), Wellington (2ZM) and Christchurch (3ZM) in 1973; however, all these stations had been on air under different identities in earlier decades. The Auckland 1ZM station changed format to Classic Hits in 1987 and went on to become the first Classic Hits branded station creating a 10-year absence of the ZM brand in Auckland. Wellington and Christchurch ZM stations carried on as two separate local stations, switching to FM and spawning their own regional networks.

In July 1996 the New Zealand Government sold off the commercial arm of Radio New Zealand, which included, among other things, the ZM stations. The new owner was The Radio Network, a subsidiary of APN News & Media and Clear Channel Communications, which operated as a division of the Australian Radio Network.

ZM made a return to the Auckland market in February 1997 as a local station broadcasting on 91.0 MHz as 91ZM. This move was made by The Radio Network after purchasing stations in Auckland and the Waikato previously owned by Prospect Media. TRN closed Auckland station The Breeze on 91 and replaced this station with 91ZM. In Waikato The Breeze on 89.8 was closed and replaced with a network feed of Auckland's 91ZM branded as 89.8ZM. The Waikato station did contain its own local breakfast show between 1998 and 1999.

In 2000 ZM was consolidated into a single network feed with all programming on the networked ZM stations now originating from the 91ZM Auckland station. Between 2001 and 2014 the ZM breakfast show presented by Polly Gillespie and Grant Kereama was networked from Wellington to a nationwide audience including Auckland. In recent years the 10 am – 3 pm the announcer produced a localised show for Auckland with local voice breaks for Auckland listeners and then a generic voice break for the rest of New Zealand. As of 2013 all ZM stations contain the same content.

== Local programming ==
The following list of shows were heard on 91ZM Auckland as local shows, after each listed time period the content heard on 91ZM Auckland was the same as the ZM network.

- Breakfast 6 am– 9 am
  - 1997–2001: Marcus Lush (show ran from 6 am–9 am)
  - 1997–2001: Natalie Crook (show producer)
  - 2001-2014: Networked from Wellington (6am – 10am)
  - 2014 onwards: Networked from Auckland to all regions
- Daytime 9 am– 3 pm
  - 1998–1999: Melanie Homer
  - 1999–2000: Nicki Sunderland and Lana Coc-kroft
  - 2000 onwards: Networked from Auckland to all regions
- Drive 3 pm– 3 pm
  - 1999–2000: Mike McClung and Tim Homer
  - 2000 onwards: Networked from Auckland to all regions
- Night Show 7 pm–midnight
  - 1997–1998: Melanie Homer
  - 1998 onwards: Networked from Auckland to all regions
