= List of print media in New Zealand =

This is a list of print media in New Zealand. New Zealand once had several daily newspapers in each major city, usually for the morning and evening. However now most cities only have one daily or weekly paper.

There are no national newspapers however The New Zealand Herald is distributed widely outside of its core distribution area and the same is true but to a lesser extent for the Otago Daily Times and The Post. The four main centres of New Zealand each have a major newspaper based in them Auckland (The New Zealand Herald), Christchurch (The Press), Dunedin (Otago Daily Times) and Wellington (The Post). Along these there are several low-budget and free papers which cater for particular areas or subcultures. The majority of newspapers published in New Zealand are owned by NZME or Stuff.

== Newspaper circulation and readership ==
Publication	City	Circulation	Readership (2024/2025)	Owned by (2024)	Founded
The New Zealand Herald	Auckland	100,073 (2021)	504,000	NZME	1863
Herald on Sunday	Auckland		308,000	NZME	2004
The Star	Christchurch		80,000	Star Media	1868
Sunday Star-Times	Auckland	77,000 (2017)	195,000	Stuff	1994
The Post	Wellington	30,473	116,000	Stuff	2002
The Press	Christchurch	31,207 (2021)	93,000	Stuff	1861
Otago Daily Times	Dunedin	24,904 (2023)	91,000	Allied Press	1861
The Star	Dunedin			Allied Press	1863
Rodney Times	Auckland		39,000	Stuff	1901
Hawke's Bay Today	Hastings	15,690 (2019)		NZME	1999
Te Puke Times	Te Puke	15,418 (2023)		NZME	1912
Manawatū Guardian	Palmerston North	14,497 (2023)		NZME	1972
Horowhenua Chronicle	Levin	12,984 (2023)		NZME	1893
Waikato Times	Hamilton	11,633 (2021)	57,000	Stuff	1872
Katikati Advertiser	Katikati	11,062 (2023)		NZME	1967
Bay of Plenty Times	Tauranga	10,162 (2019)		NZME	1872
The Northern Advocate	Whangārei	9,676 (2019)		NZME	1875
The Southland Times	Invercargill	9,501 (2021)		Stuff	1862
Taranaki Daily News	New Plymouth	8,704 (2021)		Stuff	1857
Whanganui Chronicle	Whanganui	7,498 (2019)		NZME	1856
The Nelson Mail	Nelson	5,532 (2021)		Stuff	1866
Rotorua Daily Post	Rotorua	5,207 (2019)		NZME	1885
Manawatū Standard	Palmerston North	5,058 (2021)		Stuff	1880
Wairarapa Times-Age	Masterton	5,053 (2021)		Stuff	1878
The Timaru Herald	Timaru	4,885 (2021)		Stuff	1864
Gisborne Herald	Gisborne	4,648 (2021)		NZME	1874
Ashburton Guardian	Ashburton	4,306 (2019)		Ashburton Guardian Co.	1879
Marlborough Express	Blenheim	2,917 (2021)		Stuff	1866
Westport News	Westport	1,884 (2008)		The Westport News	1871

== Magazine circulation and readership ==
Rank	Name	Circulation (2025/2026)	Founded	Publisher
1	AA Directions	397,000	1991	SCG Media / New Zealand Automobile Association
2	New Zealand Listener	198,000	1939	Are Media
3	Fish & Game	147,000	1993	Fish & Game New Zealand
4	Kia Ora	132,000	2004	Are Media / Air New Zealand
5	New Zealand Woman's Day	122,000	1989	Are Media
6	Dish	103,000	2004	SCG Media
7	TV Guide	100,000	1983	Stuff
8	Cuisine	99,000	1986	Slick & Sassy Media
9	Habitat	90,000	2004	SCG Media / Resene
10	Consumer	85,000	1959	Consumer NZ
10	New Zealand Gardener	85,000	1944	Stuff
10	New Zealand Woman's Weekly	85,000	1932	Are Media
11	The Australian Women's Weekly New Zealand	83,000	1993	Are Media
12	NZ House & Garden	79,000	1994	Stuff
13	Mindfood	77,000	2008	McHugh Media
14	Heritage New Zealand	65,000	1983	Heritage New Zealand
15	Bunnings Magazine	60,000	2019	Bunnings
16	National Geographic	59,000	1888	National Geographic Partners
17	Life & Leisure	55,000	2010	Countrywide
17	North & South	55,000	1986	School Road Publishing
18	New Idea	54,000	1902	Are Media
19	Home	52,000	1936	Nook Publishing
20	Your Home & Garden	51,000	1996	Are Media
21	New Zealand Geographic	48,000	1989	Kowhai Media
22	That's Life!	41,000	1994	Are Media
23	Kiwi Gardener	40,000	1998	Allied Media
24	Metro	38,000	1981	Metro Media Group
25	Time	37,000	1923	Time USA, LLC.
26	New Zealand Fashion Quarterly	32,000	1980	Elcoat Media
26	New Zealand Outdoor Hunting	32,000	1937	eQube publishing
27	New Zealand Fishing News	31,000	1978	NZ Fishing News Inc.
28	New Zealand Autocar	30,000	1996	Autocar Ltd.
29	Good	28,000		
30	Grapevine	26,000	1981	Grapevine Communications
30	New Zealand Classic Car	26,000		Rusty Media

== Newspapers ==
List of defunct and operating newspapers in New Zealand by date of launch.

1830s

- New Zealand Gazette

1840s

- Nelson Examiner and New Zealand Chronicle
- New Zealand Spectator and Cook's Strait Guardian
- New Zealander

1850s

- The Colonist
- Daily Southern Cross
- Hawke's Bay Herald
- Lyttelton Times
- New Zealand Chronicle
- Otago Witness
- Taranaki Herald

1860s

- Bruce Herald
- The Star (Christchurch)
- The Star (Dunedin)
- The Evening Post
- Evening Star
- Grey River Argus
- Greymouth Star (1866–2026)
- Nelson Evening Mail
- The Timaru Herald
- Tuapeka Times
- The Wellington Independent
- West Coast Times (1865–1884)

1870s

- Auckland Star
- Bay of Plenty Times
- Clutha Leader
- The Ensign
- Hokitika Guardian (1882–2026)
- The New Zealand Times (1874–1927)
- The Oamaru Mail
- North Otago Times
- Southland Times
- Timaru Herald
- Wanganui Chronicle
- Wanganui Herald

1890s

- Horowhenua Chronicle (1893–2024)
- Paeroa Gazette
- The Kawhia Settler and Raglan Advertiser (1901–1936)

1900s

- Raglan Chronicle
- Rodney Times

1910s

- Industrial Unionist
- Maoriland Worker, aka the Standard
- Northern News
- Te Puke Times (1912–2024)

1920s

- The Hutt News

1930s

- Manukau Courier
- Te Awamutu Courier (1936–2024)
- Zealandia

1940s

- North Shore Times

1960s

- Central Leader
- Katikati Advertiser (1967–2024)
- Stratford Press (1960–2024)
- Sunday News
- Western Leader

1970s

- Bush Telegraph (1977–2024)
- National Business Review

1980s

- CHB Mail (1988–2024)
- Auckland City Harbour News
- Eastern Courier
- River City Press
- Waihī Leader (1981–2020)
- Whanganui Midweek (1988–2024)

1990s

- Cook Strait News
- East & Bays Courier
- The Flagstaff
- The Hastings Leader (1996–2004; 2006–2024)
- Napier Courier (1996–2024)
- Selwyn Times
- Sunday Star-Times

2000s

- Hibiscus Matters
- Mahurangi Matters
- Herald on Sunday
- The Weekend Sun

2010s

- Manawatū Guardian (2010–2024)
- Taupō & Tūrangi Herald (2014–2024)

2020s

- Hauraki-Coromandel Post (2020–2024)
- The Waikato Local (since 2024)
- West Coast Times (since 2026)

Unknown launch date

- Hamilton Press

== Magazines ==
=== Operating ===
List of operating magazines in New Zealand by date of launch.

1920s

- Forest & Bird, originally Birds (since 1923)

1930s

- New Zealand Woman's Weekly (1932 to 2020, since 2020)
- New Zealand Listener (since 1939)

1940s

- New Zealand Gardener (since 1944)

1970s

- NZ Rugby News (since 1970)
- Art New Zealand (since 1977)
- Art News Aotearoa, originally Art News New Zealand (since 1979)

1980s

- Fashion Quarterly, originally Fashion (1980 to 2020, since 2020)
- Metro (since 1981)
- Cuisine (since 1986)
- North & South (since 1986)
- New Zealand Geographic (since 1989)
- Woman's Day (since 1989)

1990s

- The Australian Women's Weekly New Zealand (since 1993)
- NZ House & Garden (since 1994)
- Lucire (since 1997)
- Remix (since 1997)
- Kiwi Gardener (since 1998)
- Metropol (since 1998)

2000s

- NZ Classic Driver (since 2003)
- Avenues (since 2004)
- Kia Ora (since 2007)
- Mindfood (since 2008)

2010s

- Denizen (since 2011)
- Capital (since 2013)
- Denizen Modern Living (since 2016)
- Playboy New Zealand (since 2019)

2020s

- Viva (since 2020, also as a weekly supplement to The New Zealand Herald since 1998)
- Harper's Bazaar Australia / New Zealand (since 2021)
- Rolling Stone AU / NZ (since 2022)
- FHM New Zealand (since 2025)

=== Defunct ===
List of defunct magazines in New Zealand by date of launch.

1840s

- New Zealand Journal (1840 to 1852)

1850s

- New Zealand Magazine (1850)

1860s

- Auckland Punch (1868 to 1869)
- Canterbury Punch (1865)
- Chapman’s New Zealand Monthly Magazine (1862)
- Otago Punch (1866 to 1867)
- Southern Monthly Magazine (1863 to 1866)
- Taranaki Punch (1860 to 1861)

1870s

- New Zealand Tablet (1873 to 1996)

1880s

- New Zealand Punch (1888)
- Zealandia (1889)

1890s

- New Zealand Graphic and Ladies’ Journal (1890 to 1908)

1920s

- Aussie New Zealand (1923 to 1932)
- The Mirror (1922 to 1963)
- New Zealand Railways Magazine (1926 to 1940)

1930s

- Home and Building (1937 to 1975)
- New Zealand Mercury (1933 to 1936)
- Oriflamme and Sirocco (1933)
- Spilt Ink (1932 to 1937)
- Tomorrow (1934 to 1940)
- Women To-day (1936 to 1939)

1940s

- All Sports Monthly, Sports Digest from 1963 (1949 to 1979)
- Arena (1942 to 1975)
- Here and Now (1948 to 1957)
- Junior Digest (1945 to 1965)
- New Zealand Farmer (1946 to 2001)
- New Zealand Sportsman (1946 to 1960)
- New Zealand Woman and Stitch (194? to 1974)

1950s

- Playdate as Cinema and then Cinema, Stage & TV till 1960 (1956 to 1972)
- Te Ao Hou / The New World (1952 to 1974)
- Vogue New Zealand (1957 to 1968) - from 1955 to 1957 as a supplement to "British Vogue"

1960s

- Elegance in Australia & New Zealand (1960s) - Australian/New Zealand version of Flair
- Eve (1966 to 1975)
- Life New Zealand (1967 to 1968)
- The Northlander (1961 to 1977)
- Thursday (1968 to 1976)

1970s

- Broadsheet (1972 to 1997)
- The New Zealand Charity and Legal Gazette (1975 to 2016)
- Out! (1976 to 2009)
- Penthouse Forum New Zealand (1973 to 1985)
- Rip It Up (1977 to 2015)

1980s

- ChaCha (1983 to ?)
- Dolly New Zealand (1985 to ?)
- More (1983 to 1996)
- Sheila New Zealand (1980s)
- W5 (1980s)
- Wellington Cosmo (1984 to 1987)

1990s

- Cleo New Zealand (1995 to 2016)
- Creme (1999 to 2014)
- Fashion Quarterly Entertaining (1997 to 1998, 2011 to ?)
- Grace (1999 to 2001)
- Mana (1993 to 2017)
- Next (1991 to 2020)
- Pavement (1993 to 2006)
- Real Groove (1993 to 2010)
- Simply You (1998 to 2020)

2000s

- BLACK (2008 to 2020)
- FQ Men (2004 to ?)
- Investigate (2000 to 2015)
- Nylon Aust / NZ (2005 to 2006)
- Spasifik (2004 to 2019)

2010s

- FQ Life (2015 to ?)
- FQ Occasions (2010 to ?)
- Miss FQ (2016 to 2019)
- Maxim New Zealand (2019 to 2025)

2020s

- Thrive (2020 to 2022)
- Woman (2020 to 2022, 2023 to 2024)
- FQ Living (2023 to 2023)
- Cosmpolitan Australia, New Zealand version (2025 to 2025)

=== Never launched ===
L'Officiel New Zealand was planned to launch in 2014, however, it never entered publication, it was to be published by the publisher of Australian L'Officiel.

=== Student magazines ===
List of student magazines in New Zealand by date of launch.

- Critic Te Ārohi (University of Otago; since 1925)
- Craccum (University of Auckland; since 1927)
- Canta (University of Canterbury; since 1930)
- Salient (Victoria University of Wellington; since 1938)
- Gyro (Otago Polytechnic; 1960s to 2014)
- Nexus (University of Waikato; since 1967)
- Debate (Auckland University of Technology (AUT); since 1997)
- Massive (Massey University; since 2012)
- Ram (Lincoln University; since 2016)

=== Literary magazines ===
1930s

- Phoenix (1932)

1940s

- Book (1942–1947)
- Landfall (1947 to present)
- New Zealand New Writing (1943 to 1945)

1980s

- Sport (1988–2019)

== See also ==
- Joseph Ivess (1844–1919), who had an association with about 40 newspapers and founded many of them
- News Publishers' Association, industry body representing news publishers in New Zealand
