= Project Runway New Zealand =

- Created by: Eli Holzman
- Starring: Georgia Fowler (host); Benny Castles; Sally-Ann Mullin; Andreas Mikellis
- Country of origin: New Zealand
- No. of episodes: 12

Original release
- Network: TVNZ 2
- Release: 1 October – 17 December 2018

Project Runway New Zealand is a New Zealand-based reality competition show, and an adaptation of the international Project Runway franchise. The show aired for one season, from 1 October to 12 November 2018, on TVNZ 2. It was hosted by Georgia Fowler, and featured 14 contestants from the country, competing to win a Holden Astra car, a cash prize of $50,000 NZD, and a six-page cover spread in Fashion Quarterly magazine.

The winner of the season was Benjamin Alexander, who resides in Auckland, New Zealand, whilst the runner-up of the competition was Jess Hunter.

== Overview ==
=== Contestants ===
(Ages and names stated are at time of contest)

Contestant	Age	Hometown	Outcome
Benjamin Alexander	23	Auckland, New Zealand	Winner
Jess Hunter	23	Auckland, New Zealand	Runner-Up
Kerry Ranginui	33	Whanganui, New Zealand	3rd place
Judy Gao	24	Auckland, New Zealand	4th place
Peni Moala	29	Arrowtown, New Zealand	5th place
Caitlin Crisp	22	Christchurch, New Zealand	6th place
Misty Ratima	40	Napier, New Zealand	7th place
Camille Richard	22	Auckland, New Zealand	8th place
Beth Hornsby-Hunt	31	Auckland, New Zealand	9th place
Beau Takapu	37	Auckland, New Zealand	10th Place
Massey Williams	38	Christchurch, New Zealand	11th Place
Matt Costello	26	Nelson, New Zealand	12th Place
Lenon Wakauwa	27	Invercargill, New Zealand (Note: Lenon Wakauwa's location was reported as Invercargill on the official TVNZ 2 website, but on the pilot episode, her location was stated as Timaru.)	13th Place
Nicole Schmidt	29	Central Hawkes Bay, New Zealand	14th Place

=== Models ===
All of the models on the Project Runway New Zealand are represented by elite Auckland-based modeling agency Red 11 Model Management.

Models
Julia Makhovskaya
Rael Wright
Maddy Mossman
Tia Harris
Chloe Wilson
Heidi Watson
Gracie Lambert
Dante Numa
Christina Katherine
Tashi Sylva Levett
Lola Audrey
Courtney Armour
Isabelle Steinmann
Jaimee McLaughlan
Jenna Watermeyer
Houston Murray
Lana Van Hout
Deanna Yearbury

== Contestant progress ==
Elimination Chart
Contestant	1	2	3	4	5	6	7	8	9	10	11	12
Benjamin	WIN	HIGH	IN	HIGH	HIGH	WIN	HIGH	HIGH	HIGH	HIGH	HIGH	Winner
Jess	IN	IN	IN	IN	HIGH	HIGH	IN	LOW	WIN	HIGH	WIN	Runner-up
Kerry	IN	IN	WIN	IN	IN	IN	LOW	LOW	LOW	WIN	LOW	Second Runner Up
Judy	IN	LOW	HIGH	WIN	WIN	LOW	IN	IN	HIGH	LOW	OUT	
Peni	IN	IN	LOW	HIGH	LOW	HIGH	HIGH	HIGH	LOW	OUT		
Caitlin	HIGH	IN	IN	IN	LOW	LOW	WIN	WIN	OUT			
Misty	IN	IN	HIGH	LOW	IN	IN	LOW	OUT				
Camille	HIGH	HIGH	LOW	IN	IN	IN	OUT					
Beth	IN	LOW	HIGH	IN	IN	OUT						
Beau	IN	IN	LOW	LOW	OUT							
Massey	LOW	WIN	IN	OUT								
Matt	LOW	IN	OUT									
Lenon	IN	OUT										
Nicole	OUT											

The designer won the challenge.
The designer was part of the winning team, but did not win the main challenge.
The designer had the second highest score for that challenge.
The designer received positive critiques but ultimately moved to the next challenge.
The designer received judges critiques but ultimately moved to the next challenge.
The designer received negative critiques but ultimately moved to the next challenge.
The designer was in the bottom two.
The designer was eliminated.

== Episodes ==
No. overall	No. in season	Title	Original release date
1	1	"New Series"	1 October 2018
The 14 designers meet each other in Auckland, New Zealand, where they are greeted by the show's host Georgia Fowler and mentor Andreas Mikellis. For their first challenge, Fowler tasked the designers to create a cocktail dress that is inspired by the variety of flavors of the Scandinavian drink franchise, Höpt. Additionally, the models for each contestant appeared for the very first time, and were assigned particularly for each designer by the judges. On the runway, Beau Takapu, Beth Hornsby-Hunt, Jess Hunter, Judy Gao, Kerry Ranginui, Lenon Wakauwa, Misty Ratima and Peni Moala were declared safe by earning enough points by the judges. Designers Benjamin Alexander and Caitlyn Crisp received positive remarks for their runway looks by the judges, with the former contestant winning the overall challenge and receiving immunity for the next challenge. Camille Richard and Matt Costello received mixed remarks, but ultimately moved to the next challenge. Massey Williams and Nicole Schmidt did not impress the judges with their runway looks, and were both placed in the bottom two. After the judges final decision, Williams was saved for the next challenge, whilst Schmidt was eliminated from the competition.: Guest Judge: Jessica Grubiša; Challenge: Construct a runway outfit inspired by the cocktail drink Höpt.; Challenge Winner: Benjamin Alexander; Bottom Two: Massey Williams and Nicole Schmidt; Eliminated: Nicole Schmidt
2	2	"Episode 2"	8 October 2018
The 13 designers are tasked by Andreas Mikellis to create a look inspired by streetwear. Each designer have to look for one specific fashion item in Sylvia Park, Auckland, and based their conceptual design on that item. After this, Mikellis asks each contestant to swap their chosen product with another designer, effectively changing their initial ideas; each designer is then given a time limit for sketching their outfit, and executing it in the work room. On the runway, Beau Takapu, Caitlin Crisp, Jess Hunter, Kerry Ranginui, Matt Costello, Misty Ratima, and Peni Moala were declared safe by earning enough points by the judges. Designers Benjamin Alexander and Massey Williams were praised for their runway looks, with the latter contestant receiving rave reviews for his redemption of last weeks runway look; Williams was declared the winner of the challenge and received immunity for the next challenge. Camille Richard's and Judy Gao's ideas for their runway look was commended, but the execution was criticized by the judges; they were ultimately put through the next challenge. Beth Hornsby-Hunt and Lenon Wakauwa were criticized for not having cohesive designs, and were both placed in the bottom two. After the judges final decision, Hornsby-Hunt was saved for the next challenge, whilst Wakauwa was eliminated from the competition.: Guest Judge: Challenge: Create streetwear that is inspired by a chosen fashion item.; Challenge Winner: Massey Williams; Bottom Two: Beth Hornsby-Hunt and Lenon Wakauka; Eliminated: Lenon Wakauka
3	3	"Episode 3"	15 October 2018
The 12 designers are tasked by Andreas Mikellis to create a two-piece runway look using unconventional materials. Each designer are paired into a team of two: Beau and Matt, Benjamin and Caitlin, Beth and Misty, Camille and Peni, Jess and Massey, and Judy and Kerry. The teams have to include their own signature style of design-making, and each member must create either one of the two-pieces for their runway look. Each designer is then given a time limit for sketching their outfit, and executing it in the work room. On the runway, teams Benjamin and Caitlin, and Jess and Massey were declared safe by earning enough points by the judges. Team Beth and Misty were complimented for their runway presentation and narrative, and were declared safe. Judy and Kerry were deemed the winning team for their collaboration, with Kerry winning the main challenge and receiving immunity for the next challenge. Camille and Peni received mixed reviews for their runway look, but were ultimately declared safe. Beau and Matt are the losing team, and were criticized for their lack of teamwork and conceptual ideas. After the judges final decision, Beau was saved for the next challenge, whilst Matt was eliminated from the competition.: Guest Judge: Challenge: Create a two-piece look using unconventional materials whilst in a pair of two.; Challenge Winner: Kerry Ranginui; Bottom Two: Beau Takapu and Matt Costello; Eliminated: Matt Costello
4	4	"Episode 4"	22 October 2018
The 11 designers are tasked by Andreas Mikellis to create a new design for reusable shopping bags at the New Zealand-based supermarket New World, as an ode to environmental issues throughout the world. Additionally, the design will be a loose influence for their runway look, which is to create a red carpet-inspired runway look. Each designer is then given a time limit for sketching their outfit, and executing it in the work room. On the runway, Beth Hornsby-Hunt, Caitlin Crisp, Camille Richard, Jess Hunter and Kerry Ranginui were declared safe. Benjamin Alexander and Peni Moala were commended for their runway looks and designs, though Alexander was critique for his lack of red carpet elements; both were declared safe. Judy Gao's design was complimented for her entire design and New World bad, and was declared the winner of the challenge, receiving immunity for next week's challenge. Beau Takapu, Massey Williams and Misty Ratima received mixed feedback for their runway looks, though Ratima's bag was deemed the best. Ratima is deemed safe for the next challenge, leaving Takapu and Williams in the bottom two. After the judges final decision, Takapu was saved for the next challenge, whilst Williams was eliminated from the competition.: Guest Judge: Ashleigh Good; Challenge: Create a red-carpet inspired runway look.; Challenge Winner: Judy Gao; Bottom Two: Beau Takapu and Massey Williams; Eliminated: Massey Williams
5	5	"Episode 5"	29 October 2018
The 10 designers are tasked by Andreas Mikellis to create an avant garde-inspired look that included certain interior and exterior designs/ideas of the Holden Astra car. Each designer is then given a time limit for sketching their outfit, and executing it in the work room. On the runway, Beth Hornsby-Hunt, Camille Richard, Kerry Ranginui and Misty Ratima were declared safe by earning enough points by the judges. Benjamin Alexander and Jess Hunter were commended for their runway looks and designs, though the judges noted that Alexander's outfit was becoming uncomfortable for his model, which required her to remove the garment post-runway during the judges deliberation; both were declared safe. Judy Gao's design was heavily praised for its design and commercial appeal; Gao was declared the winner of the challenge, receiving immunity for next week's challenge. Peni Moala was criticized for his unfinished design, whereas Beau Takapu and Caitlin Crisp received criticism for their lack of avant garde inspiration. Moala was deemed safe for the next challenge, leaving Takapu and Crisp in the bottom two. After the judges final decision, Crisp was saved for the next challenge, whilst Takapu was eliminated from the competition.: Guest Judge: Tanya Carlson; Challenge: Create an avant-garde look inspired by the designs of a Holden Astra.; Challenge Winner: Judy Gao; Bottom Two: Beau Takapu and Caitlin Crisp; Eliminated: Beau Takapu
6	6	"Episode 6"	29 October 2018
The 9 designers were taken to a forest by their mentor Andreas Mikellis. There, Mikellis had revealed a range of wallpapers placed on trees throughout the forest; he tasks the designers to run and grab any wallpaper of choice, and create a high-fashion piece inspired by the patterns of their chosen wallpaper. Each designer is then given a time limit for sketching their outfit, and executing it in the work room. On the runway, Camille Richard, Kerry Ranginui and Misty Ratima were declared safe by earning enough points by the judges. Benjamin Alexander and Jess Hunter received rave reviews for their runway looks, with the former contestant winning the challenge, receiving immunity for next week's challenge. Peni Moala's runway look was commended for its design, but criticized for execution; Moala was declared safe. Beth Hornsby-Hunt, Caitlin Crisp and Judy Gao received negative feedback for their looks, though Crisp was commended for the detailing of her outfit. Crisp was declared safe, leaving Hornsby-Hunt and Gao in the bottom two. Because Gao received immunity from last weeks challenge, she was automatically saved, and Hornsby-Hunt was eliminated from the competition.: Guest Judge: Marc Moore; Challenge: Create a high-fashion piece inspired by their chosen wallpapers.; Challenge Winner: Benjamin Alexander; Bottom Two: Beth Honsby-Hunt and Judy Gao; Eliminated: Beth Honsby-Hunt
7	7	"Episode 7"	12 November 2018
Taking place at Boxing Alley gym, the 8 designers were tasked by Andreas Mikellis and Georgia Fowler to create a look that was useful to use as gym-wear and street fashion. The best runway look will be modeled by Fowler herself in the show's campaign, alongside the additional immunity prize. Each designer is then given a time limit for sketching their outfit, and executing it in the work room. On the runway, Judy Gao and Jess Hunter were declared safe by earning enough points by the judges. Cailtin Crisp and Peni Moala received rave reviews for their runway designs, with Crisp winning the challenge, receiving immunity for next week's challenge. Benjamin Alexander's runway look was commended for his fabric choices, but criticized for execution; he was declared safe. Furthermore, Kerry Ranginui was criticized for his editing choices of his look, but was deemed safe for the next challenge. Camille Richards and Misty Ratima were placed in the bottom two for their runway looks. After the judges final decision, Ratima was saved for the next challenge, whilst Richards was eliminated from the competition.: Guest Judge: Challenge: Create a look inspired by gym wear and street fashion.; Challenge Winner: Caitlin Crisp; Bottom Two: Camille Richards and Misty Ratima; Eliminated: Camille Richards
8	8	"Episode 8"	19 November 2018
Guest Judge: Robert Niwa; Challenge: Repurpose second-hand bridesmaid's dress into fashionable as request.; Challenge Winner: Caitlin Crisp; Bottom Two: Jess Hunter and Misty Ratima; Eliminated: Misty Ratima
9	9	"Episode 9"	26 November 2018
Challenge: Create an evening wear.; Challenge Winner: Jess Hunter; Bottom Two: Caitlin Crisp and Peni Moala; Eliminated: Caitlin Crisp
10	10	"Episode 10"	3 December 2018
Guest Judge: Paris Mitchell Temple; Challenge: Create a look inspired by tailored suiting.; Challenge Winner: Kerry Ranginui; Bottom Two: Judy Gao and Peni Moala; Eliminated: Peni Moala
11	11	"Episode 11"	10 December 2018
Guest Judge: Georgia Currie; Challenge: Create one look from their own Spring-Summer 2019's collection that showcases their personal design aesthetic.; Challenge Winner: Jess Hunter; Bottom Two: Judy Gao and Kerry Ranginui; Eliminated: Judy Gao
12	12	"Episode 12"	17 December 2018
Guest Judge: Kylie Cooke, Sean Patrick Kelly; Challenge: Create all 5 looks from their own Spring-Summer 2019's collection.; 2nd runner-up: Kerry Ranginui; Runner-up: Jess Hunter; Project Runway New Zealand winner: Benjamin Alexander
