= Centrist (website) =

New Zealand alternative media website

- Website type: News, alternative media
- Available in: English
- Owners: Jim Grenon (until 2023), Tameem Adam Abdul-majeed Barakat
- Website: centrist.nz
- Commercial: Yes
- Registration: Optional
- Launched: 2023; 3 years ago
- Current status: Online

Centrist is an alternative news platform that was launched in 2023 by Canadian-New Zealand billionaire Jim Grenon. Its stated goal is to provide links and summarise content from various independent, alternative and mainstream media sources. NZ News Essential (NZNE), another alternative media website launched by Grenon, was a sister website of the Centrist until the former was integrated as a weekly summary newsletter called Centrist Exclusives (or CE) in August 2024.

== Coverage and editorial standpoint ==
The Centrist is a self-described news aggregator that summarises, curates and distributes media content including news reports, opinion columns and blogs. Its stated goals have included informing New Zealanders about the "big issues" facing them, "distilling" a broad range of media sources, providing "critical thinking" original content, claiming to promote a "centrist" standpoint, and "strengthen power and democracy." The Centrist has claimed to "present under-served perspectives and reason-based analysis" that have been ignored or neglected by mainstream media.

The Centrist has taken right-wing editorial standpoints; publishing articles criticising tax reform, diversity, equity and inclusion (DEI) programmes, rent controls, the World Economic Forum, the Sixth Labour Government and left wing parties. It has also focused on controversial issues such as transgender rights, the Treaty of Waitangi and vaccine injury and efficacy. The Centrist has also republished content from conservative figures and groups such as Bob McCoskrie of Family First New Zealand, Avi Yemini of Rebel News and Cameron Slater's BFD website. The platform has also expressed climate skepticism, contending that climate activists were promoting emissions schemes that would cripple New Zealand's agricultural sector while allegedly making zero impact on global methane levels.

Stuff journalist Charlie Mitchell, Auckland University of Technology (AUT) head of journalism Greg Treadwell and AUT researcher Danielle Selman Julian have described the Centrist along with The Platform and Reality Check Radio as part of a wave of "anti-establishment media" that emerged in New Zealand during the post-COVID-19 period as a "backlash" against traditional media coverage of cultural and political issues.

== History ==
After the Canadian billionaire Jim Grenon immigrated to New Zealand in 2012, he registered a company called JTG3 Ltd in 21 October 2016. In March 2023, JTG3 Ltd was renamed The Centrist Ltd. Grenon was the Centrist's sole shareholder and director until 27 June and 2 August 2023, when he was succeeded by Tameem Adam Abdul-majeed Barakat, a fellow Canadian emigrant. Grenon launched the Centrist in 2023 in response to the NZME-owned The New Zealand Herald and Business Desk's alleged editorial imbalance on co-governance, climate science, the New Zealand government response to the COVID-19 pandemic, the Three Waters reform programme and Inland Revenue Department's high net worth project.

During the period leading up to the 2023 New Zealand general election on 14 October 2023, the Centrist spent NZ$100,000 on promoting several advertisements on Facebook and Instagram attacking Te Pāti Māori and the Labour Party while supporting the ACT, National and New Zealand First parties.

On 17 August 2024 NZ News Essential, a second media platform launched by Grenon and his associates Matthew Gray and Glenn James Arthur, merged with the Centrist and became an associated periodic online magazine called Centrist exclusives (or CE).

The website has also financially supported certain stories and financed legal actions to combat perceived power abuses and censorship. According to Stuff, the Centrist has supported influencer Chantelle Baker's defamation cases against The New Zealand Herald and The Disinformation Project researcher Kate Hannah, with the former settling with Baker for an undisclosed sum in late September 2024.

In 2025, the Centrist supported "Stop Co-Governance" founder Julian Batchelor's defamation lawsuit against public broadcaster TVNZ and disinformation researcher Sanjana Hattotuwa. In late March 2026, Justice David Clark of the Auckland District Court dismissed Batchelor's case against TVNZ and Hattotuwa, finding Grenon liable for paying Batchelor's fees. In early July 2026, Clark ordered Grenon and Batchelor to pay legal damages to TVNZ and Hattotuwa, as well as further costs for additional submissions.
