= Boxing Alley =

Boxing gym in Auckland, New Zealand

Coordinates: 36°51′05″S 174°46′35″E

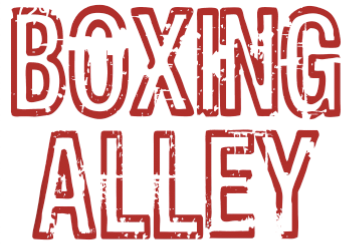

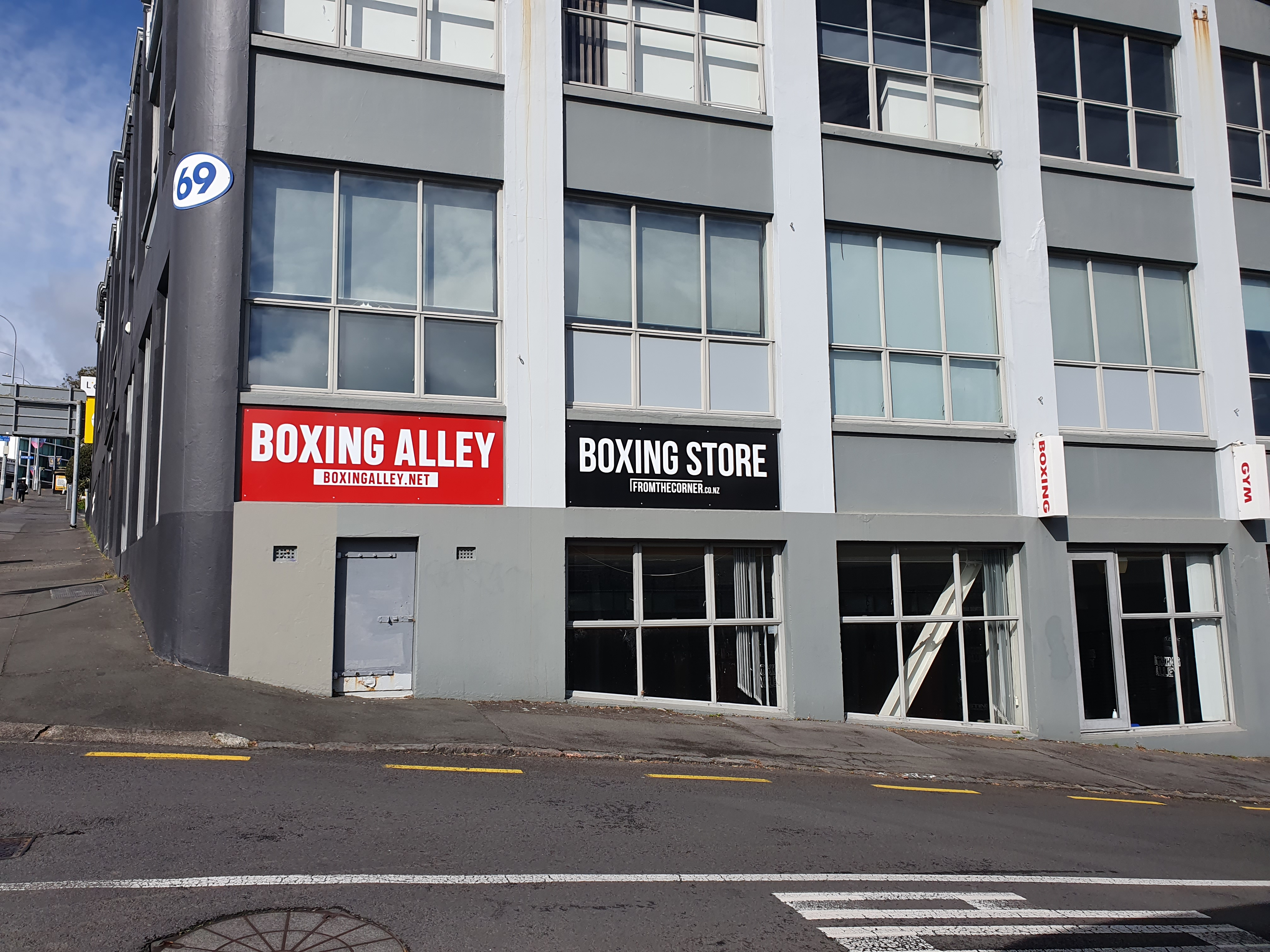
- Founded: 2006
- Headquarters: 65 Parnell Rise, Parnell, Auckland, New Zealand 1052
- Website: www.boxingalley.net

Boxing Alley is a boxing gym located in Auckland, New Zealand.

The gym is known for training many professional athletes and celebrities in boxing, most notably Monty Betham, a former rugby league footballer and professional boxer. It now caters to many boxing fitness enthusiasts.

== Charity work ==
Boxing Alley has helped raise funds for various charity organizations such as Blue Dragon Children's Foundation, Kiwis for Kiwi, Auckland Women's Refuge, and Monty Betham's Steps for Life Foundation.

In 2017, Boxing Alley formed their charity foundation called Wood For The Trees alongside Moa Brewing Company and Auckland Harley-Davidson. The foundation's mission is to help New Zealanders suffering from mental illness by providing funding to grassroots organizations.

== Television appearances ==
In 2013, an episode of The X Factor (New Zealand series 1) was filmed at Boxing Alley.

In 2018, in the seventh episode of Project Runway New Zealand (season 1), a segment was filmed at Boxing Alley featuring a challenge for the contestants. The segment also featured host and Victoria's Secret model, Georgia Fowler displaying her boxing skills with mentor Andreas Mikellis.

== Notable athletes ==
- Joseph Parker, boxer
- Sonny Bill Williams, professional boxer, rugby league and rugby union footballer
- Dustin Martin, Australian rules footballer
- Liam Messam, rugby union footballer and professional boxer
- Rose Keddell, field hockey player
- Sugar Ray Leonard, former boxer
- Jonah Lomu, former rugby union footballer
- Kali Meehan, former boxer
- Willis Meehan, boxer and rugby league footballer
- Anthony Mundine, former boxer
- Jeff Horn, boxer
- Brian Minto, former boxer
- Dan Carter, rugby union footballer
- Piri Weepu, former rugby union footballer
- DJ Forbes, former rugby union footballer
- Akira Ioane, rugby union footballer
- Ma'a Nonu, rugby union footballer
- Jerome Kaino, rugby union footballer
- Manu Vatuvei, rugby league footballer and boxer
- Konrad Hurrell, rugby league footballer
- Roger Tuivasa-Sheck, rugby league footballer
- Krystal Forgesson, hockey player
- Jimmy Spithill, yachtsman
- Alexander Ustinov, martial artist
- Brian Minto, former boxer
- Dean Lonergan, former rugby league footballer
- Martin Guptill, cricketer
- Brendon McCullum, former cricketer
- Nathan McCullum, former cricketer
- Jesse Ryder, cricketer
- Wendell Sailor, former rugby league and rugby union footballer
- Grant Dalton, sailor
- Piri Weepu, former rugby union footballer
- Karl Te Nana, former rugby union footballer
- Quade Cooper, rugby union footballer
- Iafeta Paleaaesina, former rugby league footballer
- Jerome Ropati, former rugby league footballer
- Wairangi Koopu, former rugby league footballer
- Aaron Smith (rugby union)

== Notable celebrities ==
- Lorde, singer, songwriter, and record producer
- Georgia Fowler, high fashion model
- Peter Berg, director, producer, writer, and actor
- Calum Von Moger, bodybuilder, YouTuber, and actor
- Hayley Holt, television presenter, former snowboarder, and ballroom dancer
- Sharyn Casey, television personality and radio host
- Jaime Ridge, fashion blogger
- Stan Walker, singer
- Whenua Patuwai, singer
- Pua Magasiva, actor
- Amber Peebles, television personality
- Jimi Jackson, YouTuber
- Clint Roberts, radio host
- Lily Taurau, radio host
- Nate Nauer, radio host
- Nickson Clark, radio host
- Art Green, reality television personality
- Bree Peters, actress
- Lisa O'Loughlin, reality television personality
- Andrew Mulligan, television personality and radio host
- James McOnie, television personality
- Bryce Casey, radio host
- Erin Simpson, television personality
- Laura McGoldrick, television personality
- Josef Rakich, YouTuber

== Notable sports teams ==
- New Zealand national rugby league team
- New Zealand national rugby sevens team
