= White Fungus =

Art magazine and project based in Taichung City, Taiwan

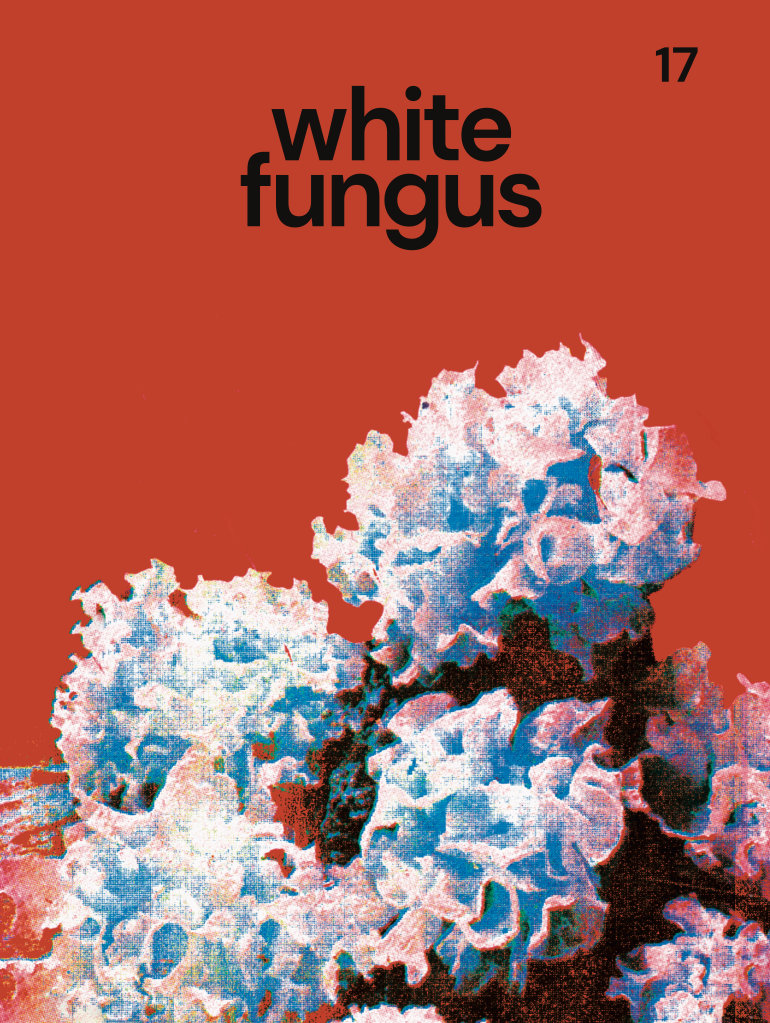
- Editor: Ron Hanson
- Categories: Arts magazine
- Frequency: Biennial
- Publisher: White Fungus
- Founded: 2004
- Based in: Taichung, Taiwan
- Language: English
- Website: www.whitefungus.com
- ISSN: 1177-1097

White Fungus is an arts magazine and project based in Taichung City, Taiwan. Founded by brothers Ron Hanson and Mark Hanson in Wellington, New Zealand in 2004, it began as an intended one-off, photocopied political zine. Over time, the publication evolved into a widely distributed print magazine with an international readership.

The name of the publication comes from a can of "white fungus" the Hansons discovered in their local Taiwan supermarket in 2003. Each cover of the magazine is derived from a scan of that can. In 2009, White Fungus relocated to Taichung City, where it has since been based.

== History ==
The first issue of White Fungus was published in October 2004 as a protest against the building of an inner-city bypass in Wellington, New Zealand. The proposed road project threatened to demolish heritage buildings and displace artists from their studios. The project had been successfully opposed by Wellingtonians for more than 40 years but was now being vigorously pushed forward by Mayor Kerry Prendergast, who is married to one of the city's biggest property developers, Rex Nicholls.

White Fungus attacked Prendergast's leadership, listed her financial holdings, and explored the history of Wellington's Te Aro area which was at risk due to the proposed road. The publication also profiled various groups of artists who were being evicted from their studios due to inner-city development, while Prendergast was simultaneously branding Wellington as New Zealand's "creative capital".

The publication was produced and distributed in the lead-up to Wellington's 2004 local body elections. It was published anonymously with articles written using pseudonyms. Copies of the first issue were printed on a photocopier, wrapped in Christmas paper, and thrown through the entrances of businesses across the city. Wellington community newspaper the Cook Strait News reported on the stunt and the mayor's response.

"Ms Prendergast has dismissed the magazine, gift-wrapped in Christmas paper and anonymously delivered to Cuba Street shops on Wednesday and Thursday. Ziggurat retail assistant Kate Bryant says: 'It was hurled in through the door by three guys, who then disappeared down the street.'

"Ms Prendergast told the Cook Strait News she welcomes intelligent and reasoned debate but not of the sort contained in White Fungus. 'I will not dignify with comment the untruths, lies and innuendo contained in White Fungus. They don't even have the integrity to say who they are,' she says. She says the only message contained in the magazine she agrees with is the importance of voting."

Prendergast was re-elected and the road was built. The first issue of White Fungus is now on permanent display at Wellington Museum as part of its exhibit about the city's protest movement against the bypass.

After an impactful beginning, the Hansons decided to continue the publication and evolve it into an arts magazine. The next two issues were also photocopied with the fourth issue being the first to be offset printed. Wellington art dealer Peter McLeavey was the first to place an advertisement in the publication, beginning in the second issue. McLeavey would continue to place advertisements in White Fungus, which he drew by hand or produced on his typewriter, until his passing in 2015. One of these advertisements was republished in Jill Trevelyan's 2013 biography Peter McLeavey: The Life and Times of a New Zealand Art Dealer.

White Fungus began building an international audience with its fifth issue in 2006. San Francisco bookstore City Lights was the first to stock the publication outside of New Zealand. In 2007, White Fungus signed a distribution deal with Ontario-based company Disticor to distribute the magazine in Canada and the US. White Fungus would subsequently work with several different distributors in Australia, New Zealand, the UK, Europe, South Korea, and Taiwan before signing a global distribution deal with London company WhiteCirc in 2013.

A pivotal moment came for the magazine when the Hansons met Taipei artist Yao Jui-Chung who visited Wellington to participate in the exhibition Islanded at Adam Art Gallery in 2006. The Hansons had spent four years living in Taiwan before beginning the magazine. Yao urged the Hansons to return to Taiwan. Meeting Hong Kong artist Lee Kit during his residency in Wellington in 2007 also stimulated the Hansons' interest in returning to Asia.

In 2009, White Fungus relocated to Taichung City, Taiwan. The Hansons have continued publishing White Fungus in Taiwan while becoming immersed in the local arts scene. As well as publishing, they have directed interdisciplinary art events in Taiwan and throughout the world. In 2020, the Hansons served as international monitors of the Taipei Art Awards at Taipei Fine Arts Museum.

== Magazine content ==
White Fungus covers a diverse range of subjects spanning art, music, politics, and history. The magazine has featured interviews with influential cultural figures. White Fungus editor Ron Hanson's interview with Carolee Schneemann in the magazine's 12th issue was subsequently republished in the 2015 monograph Unforgivable: Carolee Schneemann by Black Dog Publishing. Additionally, the publication offers in-depth explorations into various themes, including bats, art scenes in Indonesia and Hungary, The East German Stasi, Folk religion in Taiwan, Animal music, New Zealand's Pink and White Terraces, the prospect of human settlements on Mars, The global travels of Nicolai Michoutouchkine and Aloï Pilioko, and the deep fascination of Dolly Parton

The magazine features coverage of Taiwan's visual art and experimental music scenes, with a particular focus on the development of experimental music and sound art on the island following the end of martial law in Taiwan in 1987.

White Fungus has featured articles on a number of significant composers and musicians. The magazine has included articles by notable New Zealand art writers and artists, including Tao Wells.

== The Subconscious Restaurant ==
In 2012, White Fungus began a new publication and event series titled The Subconscious Restaurant, named after a former restaurant in Taipei which is now closed.

The first issue of The Subconscious Restaurant was commissioned by the Christchurch art gallery The Physics Room. It focused on experimental music in Taiwan and New Zealand, including an article by Bruce Russell about the history of DIY music in New Zealand. The publication was launched with a series of events in Christchurch, Wellington, Auckland, and Hamilton introducing Taiwanese noise music and sound art pioneer Wang Fujui to New Zealand audiences. There was also a solo exhibition, Sound Dots, by Wang at The Physics Room.

The second issue of The Subconscious Restaurant focused on the underground experimental music and art scenes in Taiwan. This was the first bilingual (English and Chinese) edition of the publication; subsequent issues are also bilingual. It was released in 2014 through events in Beijing, Hong Kong, and Macau.

The Subconscious Restaurant #3 was commissioned in 2014 by curator Kit Hammonds on the occasion of the inaugural edition of Index Art Book Fair in Guadalajara, México. This issue focused on art and music from México and Taiwan, including poetry by Hsia Yu. The publication was released at the fair with a reading in Chinese, English and Spanish of Hsia Yu’s poems, accompanied by a live mariachi band. The event was organized by Hammonds and Nick Yeck-Stauffer.

The Subconscious Restaurant #4 was commissioned in 2015 by the New Zealand Commerce and Industry Office in Taipei on the occasion of New Zealand being the Guest of Honor at the Taipei International Book Exhibition. This issue introduced New Zealand art, literature, and culture to Taiwan. It was released at an event at Huashan 1914 Creative Park in Taipei featuring New Zealand musicians Campbell Kneale, Jeff Henderson, and Greg Malcolm.

The fifth issue of "The Subconscious Restaurant" was commissioned by the Taichung Art Museum in 2025 on the occasion of its grand opening. It forms part of a collaborative project connected to the museum’s inaugural exhibition, "A Call of All Beings: See you tomorrow, same time, same place" (13 December 2025–12 April 2026).

On 7 March 2026, "White Fungus" held the first-ever event at the museum’s open-air rooftop Culture Forest. The programme included sound performances by Wang Fujui, Yenting Hsu, Nick Tsai, and Lai Shi-Chao, a live performance by Tokyo-based artist HANASAKI Kaya, and a DJ set by Lim Giong incorporating field recordings from his personal archive.

== Exhibitions ==
White Fungus has been featured in several exhibitions, including:

- Kiosk: Modes of Multiplication (2007), Artists Space, New York
- Motto Storefront (2010) at Artspeak, Vancouver
- De Zines (2010) at La Casa Encendida, Madrid
- Millennium Magazines (2012) at the Museum of Modern Art (MoMA), New York
- Facing Pages (2012) at the Dutch Art Institute, Arnhem
- Zines aus Neuseeland (2012) at the Weltkulturen Museum, Frankfurt
- Mag Is In (2012) at Casa del Pingone, Turin
- The Light of Independence (2012) at the Guangdong Times Museum, Guangzhou (The Hansons gave a talk at the museum as part of the exhibition program.)
- Mag Dossier 01 (2012–2013) at the Visual Artists Association, Municipal Garden of Nicosia, Cyprus
- TAMIZDAT (2013) at Family Business, New Holland, Saint Petersburg
- Small Press (2014) at Ramp Gallery, Hamilton
- Édition Florale (2014) by Collectif Blanc, Nomad Nation, Montreal
- Photobookshow Malmö (2014) at Vasli Souza, Malmö
- The Editorial (2016) at Taipei Fine Arts Museum
- Publishing Against the Grain (2017-ongoing) by Independent Curators International (Exhibition debuted at the Zeitz Museum of Contemporary Art Africa, Capetown in 2017 and has since toured internationally)
- The Novembre Lounge (2023) at Low Classic, Yaksu, Seoul

In 2010, White Fungus created work for the exhibition An Imaginary Archive at Enjoy Contemporary Art Space in Wellington, New Zealand. Organized by Gregory Sholette, the exhibition featured an archive of imaginary—“what if”—novels, brochures, catalogs, pamphlets, newsletters, and similar publications. The archive presented an alternative vision of the realities our society might inhabit, had the world been shaped differently. White Fungus created covers for the unrealized third and fourth issues of its zine Blank Canvas. The evolving exhibition was later installed at 126 Artist-run Gallery, Galway, Ireland (2011); Center for Contemporary Art, Graz, Austria (2013); Les Kurbas Center, Kyiv, Ukraine (2014); White Box Project Space, Friedrichshafen, Germany (2013); and Institute of Contemporary Art, Philadelphia (2015).

In 2012, White Fungus had a solo exhibition, The Consumers of the Future, at Te Pātaka Toi Adam Art Gallery in Wellington, New Zealand. The exhibition featured a series of three posters, remixing Wellington City Council publicity materials together with a quote by the New Zealand Prime Minister and former Merrill Lynch currency trader, John Key: “Our children are important... They’re the consumers of the future.” The Consumers of the Future was a commissioned project by White Fungus that accompanied the exhibitions We Will Work With You! Wellington Media Collective 1978-1998, and Martha Rosler, The Bowery in Two Inadequate Descriptive Systems.

== Residencies ==
In 2013, White Fungus was the magazine in residence at Kadist Art Foundation in San Francisco. During its time in the Bay Area, White Fungus released its 13th issue with events at Kadist and The Lab. This issue includes an article entitled "The First Woman on Mars", written by American writer and independent scholar Ron Drummond. He gave a reading of his article at the Kadist event and engaged in a conversation with Science Fiction author Kim Stanley Robinson about the viability and desirability of humans living on Mars.

== Awards ==
In 2016, White Fungus founders Ron Hanson and Mark Hanson received the inaugural Special Achievement for Contribution to the New Zealand-Taiwan Relationship at the ANZCHAM Business Awards in Taipei. The award was presented to the Hansons by Taiwan's then Vice Minister of Economic Affairs Yang Wei-fuu.
