= Jim Grenon =

Canadian-born billionaire

James Terrence Omer Grenon is a Canadian-New Zealand private equity investor and billionaire, who is the founder of Canadian investment company Tom Capital Management and director of the media company New Zealand Media and Entertainment. He also formerly owned the alternative media publications Centrist and NZ News Essentials (NZNE).

== Early life and education ==
Jim Grenon completed a Bachelor of law at the University of Manitoba in 1980. He briefly worked as a lawyer before pursuing a career in corporate and financial equity.

== Business career ==
=== Tom Capital Management and tax litigation ===
In 1995, Grenon founded a Calgary-based investment company called Tom Capital Management. The company took an interest in oil, gas, financial services, manufacturing and the real estate sectors. As of September 2023, Grenon was still listed as an advisor to Tom Capital Management. According to Newsroom, Grenon resided in Calgary during the early 2000s.

Between 2003 and 2006, Grenon set up sophisticated investment fund structure that involved diverting income funds into his personal superannuation trust. This retirement fund was registered with the Canadian Imperial Bank of Commerce. Between 2004 and 2011, Grenon's superannuation trust had earned C$58 million from these two 2003 and 2006 income funds. Thirty of these two income funds' subscribers were minors, including the children of TOM Capital employees. In addition, other adults signed on for other adults, and Grenon's superannuation fund also received funding from third parties. This fund enabled Grenon to avoid a Canadian tax on investment returns.

In 2013, Grenon withdrew C$55 million (NZ$68.2m) from his retirement fund and transferred it to New Zealand. He subsequently withdrew Can$15 million and transferred it to a high-interest account. That same year, the Canada Revenue Agency (CRA) obtained a jeopardy order against Grenon's superannuation trust, allowing it to take immediate action to collect tax debt. The CRA argued that the 2003 and 2006 income funds were not properly constituted and that Grenon had deliberately established them with deficiencies. The CRA also issued two proposal letters against Grenon's retirement trust for C$283 million and against Grenon for CAD$205 million.

The CRA's jeopardy order failed to halt the transfer of C$55 million to New Zealand, which led to a lengthy legal battle between Grenon and Canadian authorities. In 2015, the Federal Court of Canada overturned the jeopardy order on the basis that an alleged tax debt of C$283 million might not be repaid should the agency win its case. The Federal Court also awarded legal costs to both the trust and Grenon, ruling that there was no evidence that Grenon's superannuation trust would be "hollowed out."

In 2021, the Tax Court of Canada ruled against the subscription structure of Grenon's 2003 and 2006 investment funds, stating that they no longer fulfilled the conditions to be qualifying investments for Grenon's superannuation trust in order to avoid taxation. The Court also described the funds of minors as "contrary to the public policy objective of investor protection." The judge also ruled that the structure of Grenon's investment funds constituted a form of tax avoidance but disagreed with the CRA's argument that he had "recklessly disregarded" Canadian securities legislation. Grenon subsequently appealed against the CRA's reassessment of his tax bill but his superannuation trust's appeal was not upheld. The CRA reassessed his superannuation trust's tax liability including the C$152.8 million worth of units that the trust acquired in 2005.

Grenon also sued the Canadian Revenue Agency and 11 of its employees, alleging malfeasance and extortion. In December 2023, a Canadian court allowed Grenon to assert his grievances against the defendants. He alleged that the CRA's five-year audit of his and his partner's finances has caused his tax assessment liabilities to rise from C$3.8 million to C$205 million.

In November 2024, several businesses and entities associated with another scheme involving Grenon's superannuation trust and funds reorganisation had their appeal dismissed by the Federal Court of Appeal. Federal Court Madam Justice Siobhan Monaghan ruled that three of Grenon's companies engaged in tax avoidance during a 2005–2006 investment fund reorganisation, accruing C$113 million in tax-free gains. In response, lawyers representing Grenon's companies filed an appeal with the Supreme Court of Canada contending that authorities took too long to decide that tax was owing, that they complied with the "letter of the law," and that the transactions were outside the scope of Canada's tax avoidance laws.

In July 2025, the Federal Court of Appeal overturned a 2021 Tax Court finding in favour of the Grenon retirement entity, placing C$136.6 million worth of funds subject to tax. In addition, a tax court ordered Grenon's retirement entity and the corporates to pay C$1.2 million to the Canadian government. On 19 March 2026, the Supreme Court of Canada declined to hear the Grenon entity's appeal, ending 13 years of litigation.

=== Media ventures ===
In 2022, Grenon launched two alternative media websites called NZ News Essential (NZNE) and Centrist to challenged perceived mainstream media bias. The Centrist had initially been founded as JTG3 Ltd, which was registered between 2016 and 2019. In March 2023, JTG3 Ltd was renamed The Centrist Ltd. Grenon was the Centrist's sole shareholder and director until 27 June and 2 August 2023, when he was succeeded by Tameem Adam Abdul-majeed Barakat, who is also from Canada. Grenon and Barakat had also appeared in social media videos from influencer Chantelle Baker's media outfit Operation People. NZNE was initially registered as XYZ Sashi Limited by Matthew Gray in November 2022, before being renamed NZNE a few days later. Gray was succeeded as NZNE's shareholder by Glenn James Arthur. By September 2023, New Zealand Media and Entertainment (NZME) had objected to NZNE's name as a trademark infringement due to its similar name.

NZNE and Centrist have taken right-wing editorial standpoints; publishing articles criticising tax reform, diversity, equity and inclusion (DEI) programmes, rent controls, the World Economic Forum, the Sixth Labour Government and left wing parties. Both websites has also republished content from conservative figures and groups such as Bob McCoskrie of Family First New Zealand, Avi Yemini of Rebel News and Cameron Slater's BFD website. As of September 2023, both publications were offered free without subscriptions. The NZNE's contributors used pseudonyms such as Citizen Joe, Diogenes, and Blake from Downtown. According to Newsroom, NZNE and Centrist have also curated and distributed content by other media.

By September 2023, NZNE had 3,500 followers on Facebook and 2,600 followers on X (formerly Twitter). NZNE's social media accounts have published posts attacking DEI programmes, co-governance and questioning whether colonialism was responsible for the poor outcomes of Māori people. In September 2023, Centrist published an article criticising The New Zealand Herald's alleged editorial imbalance on co-governance, climate science and the New Zealand government response to the COVID-19 pandemic, and its perceived acceptance of the Sixth Labour Government's narrative on the Three Waters reform programme and Inland Revenue Department's high net worth project. On 17 August 2024, NZ News Essentials was rebranded as a periodic online magazine called Centrist exclusives (or CE) on the Centrist's website.

The Centrist has also offered to pay readers' legal fees. According to Stuff, The Centrist has supported Baker's defamation cases against The New Zealand Herald and The Disinformation Project researcher Kate Hannah, with the former settling with Baker for an undisclosed sum in late September 2024. In addition, the Centrist has supported "Stop Co-Governance" founder Julian Batchelor's defamation lawsuit against public broadcaster TVNZ and disinformation researcher Sanjana Hattotuwa. In late March 2026, Justice David Clark of the Auckland District Court dismissed Batchelor's case against TVNZ and Hattotuwa, with Grenon liable to pay Batchelor's legal fees. Clark also directed that a case management conference be held on 3 April 2026 to discuss whether Grenon wanted to be heard in Batchelor's case. On 28 May 2026, Clark rejected Grenon's lawyer Chris Patterson's bid to suppress media coverage of his client's involvement in Batchelor's lawsuit, citing "genuine public interest" in the case. On 3 July 2026, Clark rejected Patterson's argument that Grenon should not pay costs and ordered Grenon and Batchelor to pay $128,818.65 to TVNZ and $107,137 to Hattotuwa in legal costs. Clark also ordered the plaintiffs to pay further costs for additional submissions. He ruled that Grenon had instigated Batchelor's legal proceedings against TVNZ and Hattotuwa, and had sought to hide his involvement.

=== 2025 NZME takeover bid ===
On 3 March 2025, Grenon bought a 9.3 percent stake (worth NZ$9 million) in the media company New Zealand Media and Entertainment (NZME), which owns The New Zealand Herald. On 6 March, Grenon wrote to NZME proposing to remove all the directors from the board and to replace them with new directors, including himself. The journalist Andrea Vance has suggested that Grenon's takeover bid was motivated by NZME's decision not to publish advertisements by right-wing groups such as Hobson's Pledge, the anti-vaccination Voices for Freedom and the conservative Christian lobby group Family First New Zealand. Grenon has also expressed sympathy for the Free Speech Union's stated support for free speech and "plurality of voices in the Fourth Estate."

In response to Grenon's takeover bid, the media company Stuff confirmed on 21 March that it has suspended talks with NZME to acquire its Wellington and South Island newspapers. NZME had wanted to acquire these newspapers in order to promote its OneRoof rental business revenue and audience. By 26 March, Grenon said that he was willing to compromise to appease shareholders opposing his plans, including appointing NZME CEO Michael Boggs to the company's new board, as long as Grenon himself became chair. Grenon had also nominated Des Gittings, Philip Crump, and Simon West as the three other new directors.

On 31 March, the NZME board delayed its shareholder meeting on 31 March to allow the consideration of both proposals and counter-proposals, and for information to be presented to shareholders. In response to Grenon's takeover bid, the New Zealand Shareholders' Association lobbied the NZME board to ensure that the small shareholders retained their independence, that the board would have the right composition of skills needed to govern the company, and to ensure a smooth leadership election that would retain the institutional knowledge required to create stability and minimise disruption for NZME and its shareholders. On 15 April, NZME's director David Gibson resigned.

In early May 2025, former National Party MP and cabinet minister Steven Joyce was nominated to become a director and expressed willingness to replace Barbara Chapman as chair, ahead of NZME's annual shareholders meeting scheduled for 3 June 2025. On 9 May, Grenon's company JTG 4 Limited accepted a compromise arrangement for Grenon to be appointed as a director of NZME at the next annual shareholder meeting. In return, JTG withdrew its proposal for Philip Crump, Des Gittings and Henri Eliot to be appointed to replace the three remaining directors of NZME. Under this arrangement, Chapman would resign at the end of the shareholder meeting but the other three directors Sussan Turner, Guy Horrocks and Carol Campbell would remain for another term.

NZME's annual board shareholder meeting was held on 2 June 2025. During that meeting, Grenon was appointed as NZME's director while Joyce became the company's chair. On 29 August, Grenon increased his stake in NZME to 16.6%, owning NZ$29.95 million worth in shares. By 27 March 2026, Grenon had increased his stake in the company to 19.90%, acquiring 1.78 million shares for NZ$1.984 million.

=== Unauthorised Jacinda Ardern memoir ===
In 2025, NZME editor Shayne Currie and Stuff columnist Damien Grant reported that Grenon had financially supported National Business Review journalist David Cohen's unauthorised biography Jacinda: The Untold Stories. Cohen's book was written with the assistance of journalist Rebecca Keillor and drew upon interviews with various figures who had interacted with Ardern including broadcaster Mike Hosking, Heather du Plessis-Allan, microbiologist Siouxsie Wiles, Oliver Hartwich, ACT party leader David Seymour, trade unionist Matt McCarten and Stuff journalist Luke Malpass.

== Political involvement ==
During the 2023 New Zealand general election, Grenon registered as a promoter, allowing him to advertise about a candidate, political party or electoral issue.

== Personal life ==
Jim Grenon is married to Candice. The couple have lived in Auckland since 2012. Grenon owns a NZ$14.6 million property, which he acquired for about NZ$10 million in 2012.

Grenon has two children through his former wife. Between 2001 and 2016, Grenon was locked in litigation with the Canadian courts over tax deductibility payments arising from a child custody dispute with his ex-wife. During his legal battles, Grenon appealed to both the Supreme Court of Canada and Federal Court of Appeal, arguing that most child care support payers were men, who were prevented by their gender from claiming legal expenses as a tax deduction. The Federal Court ultimately dismissed his argument.
