= Radio Waitaki =

- Oamaru; New Zealand
- Broadcast area: Waitaki
- Frequencies: 1395 KHz until 2001; 98.4 MHz

Programming
- Language: English
- Format: Adult contemporary

Ownership
- Owner: Radio New Zealand until 1996; The Radio Network after 1996

History
- First air date: 1980; 46 years ago

Technical information
- Transmitter coordinates: 45.09°S 170.96°E

Links
- Website: Official website

Radio Waitaki was a radio station in Oamaru, New Zealand.

Radio Waitaki began broadcasting on 1395AM on 5 July 1980, with the late John "JR" Ramsay behind the microphone. The station was originally a commercial station operated by the government owned Radio New Zealand and used the callsign 4ZW.

Hosts included Russ Leadley, Tony Dudley, Charles Pierard, Mike Yardley, Scott Radovanovich, Luke Spittle, Steve Jukes, Mike Plant, Lana Searle, Sarah Van Der Kley, Dave Nicholas, Joel Palmer, Becky Morgan, Finley Brentwood and Sam Wilson. Past station managers include Lyall Flett (first manager), Chris Rowland, Roy Woodward, Phil Gully, Phil Stephens, Stella Nicholson, Nigel Newberry, Dan Lewis, Aaron Gillions and Gary Watling.

In July 1996 the New Zealand Government sold off the commercial arm of Radio New Zealand, the sale included Radio Waitaki. The new owner was The Radio Network, a subsidiary of APN News & Media and Clear Channel Communications, which operated as a division of the Australian Radio Network.

In 1998 The Radio Network grouped all their local stations in smaller markets together to form the Community Radio Network. Radio Waitaki continued to run a local breakfast show between 6 am and 10 am but outside breakfast all stations part of the Community Radio Network took network programming from a central studio based in Taupo.

In December 2000 the Community Radio Network was discontinued and all stations become part of the Classic Hits FM network, as a result Radio Waitaki was rebranded as Classic Hits Radio Waitaki. The station continued to run a local breakfast but now outside breakfast all programming originated from the Classic Hits studios in Auckland. In 2001, Classic Hits began broadcasting on 98.4 FM, with the original 1395AM frequency carrying Newstalk ZB.

On 28 April 2014 all stations part of the Classic Hits network were rebranded as The Hits. A networked breakfast presented by Polly Gillespie and Grant Kareama was introduced to almost all The Hits stations with the former breakfast announcer moved to present a 6-hour show between 9 am and 3 pm. The local 9 am-3 pm show was originally presented by Josh McIntyre, in 2014 Josh was moved to Timaru to present the same show for both The Hits in Timaru and Oamaru. With Polly and Grant leaving The Hits in 2017 all South Island stations reverted to local breakfast programming, today The Hits in Oamaru takes the Dunedin-based breakfast show.
