= SunMedia =

News publishing company based in Tauranga, New Zealand

- Company type: Subsidiary
- Industry: Mass media
- Headquarters: Tauranga, New Zealand
- Key people: Brian Roger (founder); Claire Rogers (founder)
- Products: Newspaper; Magazine; Digital
- Parent: New Zealand Media and Entertainment
- Website: sunlive.co.nz

SunMedia is a media company in Tauranga, New Zealand. Founded by Claire and Brian Rogers in 2000, the company was acquired by New Zealand Media and Entertainment (NZME) in 2024. SunMedia's assets consist of the SunLive website, The Weekend Sun, Coast & Country News and New Farm Dairies newspapers, and Waterline and MySpace magazines.

== History ==
SunMedia was founded around 2000 by Tauranga couple Claire and Brian Rogers. Their SunLive platform and newspapers operate in the Bay of Plenty region of the North Island. Following Brian's death in 2022, his wife Claire continued managing the company.

On 5 March 2024, SunMedia and its assets were acquired by the media company New Zealand Media and Entertainment (NZME). As part of the purchase, SunMedia's 28 employees including 17 permanent/fixed term staff received conditional employment offers from NZME. Rogers said that the NZME acquisition would preserve the viability of local journalism and advertising in Tauranga and the surrounding region. NZME CEO Michael Boggs said that the acquisition demonstrated NZME's commitment to local journalism and its publishing strategy of serving local communities and advertisers, and providing a digital news offering.

Between 2008 and 2024, SunMedia's office was based at the historic Bond Store on 1 Strand Street, Tauranga. The Category 1 heritage building was first built as a storage and customs facility in 1883. Following NZME's acquisition, SunMedia relocated its operations to NZME's office on 405 Cameron Road. SunMedia also donated its newspaper archives to the Tauranga City Library.

== Assets and organisation ==
As of June 2024, SunMedia's assets consists of the SunLive and Rotorua Now websites, the newspapers The Weekend Sun, Coast & Country News and New Farm Dairies, and the magazines Waterline and MySpace. The company also had 28 employees including 17 permanent/fixed term staff as of March 2024.

The Weekend Sun is a free weekend newspaper while Coast & Country News is a rural news publication targeting farmers, orchardists, lifestylers, suppliers, contractors and rural service industries. New Farm Dairies is a building guide aimed at new dairy farmers. Waterline is a watersports and boating magazine while MySpace is a free magazine targeting builders and renovators.
