= The Weekend Sun =

Regional newspaper in Tangura, New Zealand

The Weekend Sun is a regional newspaper based in Tauranga, New Zealand. It was launched by SunMedia in 2000 alongside Coast & Country News and Waterline magazine. In March 2024, the Weekend Sun was acquired by New Zealand Media and Entertainment (NZME) as part of its acquisition of SunMedia.

The Weekend Sun is published every Friday by NZME within the Bay of Plenty. In September 2011, it had a circulation of 63,100 homes.
