= The Wellington Independent =

Defunct New Zealand newspaper

The Wellington Independent was an early newspaper published in Wellington, New Zealand. The first issue of it was on 2 April 1845 and it continued until 1874 when it was replaced by Julius Vogel's The New Zealand Times.

The paper was published twice weekly from July 1854 and thrice weekly from July 1862, and went daily in January 1871.

Digital copies of all issues are available online via the National Library of New Zealand.
