= The Planet 97FM =

Coordinates: 41.2719°S 173.2807°E

New Zealand
- Broadcast area: Nelson, New Zealand

Programming
- Format: Hit Music

Ownership
- Owner: Planet Media Ltd 1999-2001; The Radio Network 2001-2004

History
- First air date: April 1999
- Last air date: April 2004

The Planet 97FM was a hit music radio station in Nelson, New Zealand.

== History ==
The station was founded in 1999 at 1 Haven Road, Nelson by Kevin Ihaia who was the former manager and founder of Fifeshire FM in Nelson. Ihaia left Fifeshire in 1998 after the station was sold to Radio Otago. Several ex-Fifeshire staff followed him to the new station. Ihaia left the station in 2001 and died in 2004. Originally The Planet was a locally owned and operated station playing Hot AC music.

After Ihaia left in 2001 the station was purchased by The Radio Network (TRN) and the music format was changed from Hot AC to a Hit Music format similar to the format used on network station ZM. The Planet FM slogan was changed to Today's Hit Music, the same slogan used by ZM. Following the sale the station also moved its studios to The Radio Network's Nelson premises on Selwyn street.

In April 2004 TRN purchased the frequency that had previously been leased and The Planet FM was replaced with ZM with the station branded as 97ZM. Local content was replaced with content from the ZM network and The Planet brand was phased out altogether.
