= Höpt =

Hops-flavored soda line

Höpt is a hops-flavored soda line. Fruit flavored hops sodas in the flavors of salted lychee, pear and basil, watermelon and mint, and elderberry and herb are offered. In 2014 it won the A' Design Award and Competition in the category Food, Beverage and Culinary Arts Design.
