= Bay of Plenty Times =

New Zealand regional daily paper

- Type: Daily/Morning (except Sunday) Newspaper
- Format: Tabloid
- Owner: NZME
- Editor: Scott Inglis
- Founded: 1872
- Headquarters: Tauranga, New Zealand
- Circulation: 10,162
- ISSN: 1170-0068
- Website: www.nzherald.co.nz/bay-of-plenty-times/

The Bay of Plenty Times is the regional daily paper for the Bay of Plenty area, including Tauranga, in the North Island of New Zealand.

== History ==
The Bay of Plenty Times was first produced on 4 September 1872 as a bi-weekly publication. It consisted of four tabloid-sized pages and cost three pence per issue. The founder and editor was WB Langbridge. Ownership of the newspaper changed many times over the next 40 years, including several times through mortgagee sales. Despite these hardships the Times issued a Christmas supplement in 1897 which featured one of the earliest use of photographs in New Zealand newspapers. From 1913 the paper's viability stabilised under the Gifford and Cross families. Both families were associated with the paper until it was sold to Wilson and Horton in 1992. Ownership changed again in 1996 when Independent Newspapers PC from Dublin acquired a controlling interest in Wilson and Horton. In 1976 a fire destroyed the newspaper's entire collection of back issues. The publisher had kept copies on microfilm, which are held by the Alexander Turnbull Library. The Times became more successful from the early 1950s, with its progress linked with the Bay of Plenty's rapid growth since Mt Maunganui became an export port. However, from the early 2000s it began to face challenges of declining circulation and advertising. On 5 February 2011, the Saturday edition was re-branded as the Bay Of Plenty Times Weekend. On 4 March 2013, the weekday Bay Of Plenty Times changed from broadsheet to tabloid format and from afternoon to morning delivery.

The Bay of Plenty Times has the ninth-largest circulation of New Zealand's 19 daily newspapers, at just under 11,000.

== Other publications ==
The Bay of Plenty Times also publishes the following newspapers:

=== Coastal News ===
The Coastal News is delivered free every Thursday to Whangamatā, Whiritoa, Onemana, Pauanui, Tairua and up the eastern seaboard to Whitianga.

=== Waihi Leader ===
The Waihi Leader is distributed free every Thursday to homes in Waihi, Waihi Beach, Athenree, Katikati, Waikino, MacKay Town, Karangahake, Paeroa and the surrounding areas.

=== Katikati Advertiser ===
The Katikati Advertiser is distributed free every Thursday to all Katikati urban and rural areas and Ōmokoroa.

=== Bay News ===
The Bay News was distributed every Thursday to homes in Papamoa, Te Puke, Mount Maunganui, Welcome Bay, Tauranga, Bethlehem, Pyes Pa, Te Puna, Katikati, Ōmokoroa, Waihi Beach, Waihi and Whangamatā. Publication ceased in 2018.

=== Te Puke Times ===
The Te Puke Times is distributed free every Thursday to Te Puke, Paengaroa, Maketu, Pukehina, Pongakawa, and Welcome Bay urban and rural deliveries.
