= Horowhenua Chronicle =

- Type: Weekly newspaper
- Format: Tabloid
- Owner: Richard Christie
- Editor: Ashleigh Collis
- Founded: 1893
- Relaunched: 2008; 2024
- Headquarters: Levin, New Zealand
- Circulation: 17,000
- Sister newspapers: Kapiti News
- Website: https://horowhenuachronicle.com/

Horowhenua Chronicle is a regional newspaper for the Horowhenua district, encompassing Foxton, Shannon, Tokomaru and Levin. It is published on Thursdays and delivered free to certain homes in the Horowhenua region on Fridays.

It was established in 1893, and was originally a daily paid newspaper called the Daily Chronicle until 2008, when it become a free community newspaper delivered on Wednesdays and Fridays.

In May 2020 the Horowhenua Chronicle was reduced to only one edition each week on Fridays only.

Previously, Stuff's Horowhenua Mail was delivered on Thursdays until October 13, 2022.

Slated for closure in 2024 by NZME, the Horowhenua Chronicle was bought by local media specialist Richard Christie.

Former Horowhenua Chronicle logo
