= Fashion Quarterly =

New Zealand fashion magazine

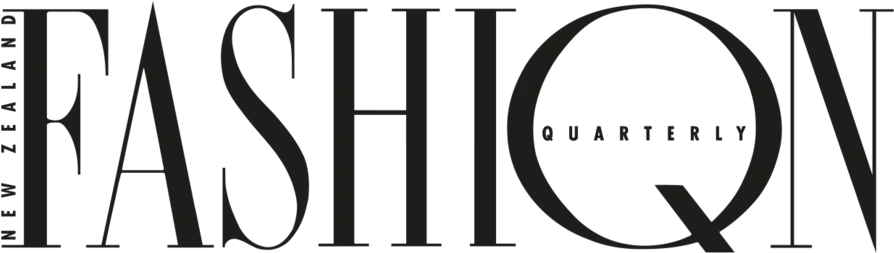

- Cover of the Summer 1988 issue, with Rachel Hunter
- Editor-in-Chief: Sarah Murray
- Categories: Fashion
- Frequency: Quarterly
- Circulation: 34,000
- Founder: Paula Ryan; Don Hope
- Company: Coordination Publishing (1980–1990); Australian Consolidated Press (1990–2012); Bauer Media Group (2013–2020); Via Media (2020–2023); Elcoat Media (2023–present)
- Country: New Zealand
- Based in: Christchurch (1980–1987); Auckland (1987–present)
- Language: English
- Website: fq.co.nz
- ISSN: 1172-4102

Fashion Quarterly (stylised in all caps), full name New Zealand Fashion Quarterly, often-abbreviated FQ, is a New Zealand quarterly fashion magazine that covers haute couture, ready-to-wear fashion, beauty, wellness, lifestyle, and culture. Founded by Paula Ryan and Don Hope, the publication is now under the control of Elcoat Media. Since 2022, Sarah Murray has served as editor-in-chief. Once boasting a readership of over one million, the magazine now circulates 34,000 copies a year.

Based in Auckland, Fashion Quarterly began publication in 1980 from Christchurch and is the oldest fashion magazine of New Zealand origin in publication.

== Background ==
Fashion Quarterly is a New Zealand fashion magazine founded in 1980 by Paula Ryan and Don Hope as Fashion (till late 1982, then as Fashion in New Zealand/Fashion till 1986, as Fashion Quarterly since 1986), it is the oldest fashion magazine of New Zealand origin in publication.

The magazine is a quarterly publication, published six times per year for autumn, winter, spring, and summer.

=== Editors ===
| Editor-in-Chief | Start year | End year |
|---|---|---|
| Paula Ryan | 1980 | 1996 |
| Christina Sayers Wickstead | 1996 | 2000 |
| Leonie Barlow | 2000 | 2007 |
| Jane Binsley | 2006 | 2006 |
| Melissa Williams King | 2007 | 2008 |
| Fiona Hawtin | 2008 | 2015 |
| Sally-Ann Mullin | 2015 | 2018 |
| Zoe Walker Ahwa | 2019 | 2020 |
| Nicole Saunders | 2020 | 2022 |
| Sarah Murray | 2022 | present |

== History ==
Inspired by the lack of a magazine dedicated to fashion in New Zealand (the last being Vogue New Zealand, 1957–1968), Paula Ryan and Don Hope launched biannual, Fashion, in 1980. Distributed freely by letterbox drop to 75,000 homes across Christchurch and assembled at their home in Fendalton. It later became available on newsstands across the country and following the launch of editions for Auckland, Wellington, and Dunedin/Invercargill, circulation rose to 300,000.

In 1986 the magazine transitioned to from biannual to quarterly, rebranding from Fashion to Fashion Quarterly. The magazine relocated its headquarters from Christchurch to Auckland in 1987.

The magazine was sold to Australian Consolidated Press (APC) in 1990. APC was later sold to the Bauer Media Group.

In 2006, APC acquired Runway Reporter it operated as the digital home of Fashion Quarterly until 2008. In 2015, fq.co.nz launched as the official website for the magazine.

Bauer Media Group ceased its New Zealand operations in April 2020 due to the economic downturn caused by the COVID-19 pandemic, several titles including Fashion Quarterly ceased publication. It was then acquired by Parkside Media (later rebranded to Via Media) and resumed publication in December. Georgia Fowler featured on the cover of the relaunch issue. In November 2023, editor-in-chief Sarah Murray acquired the magazine through Elcoat Media.

== Other editions ==
- Australian Fashion Quarterly (1993 to 1994)
- FQ Focus (1994 to 1995)
- FQ Entertaining (1997 to 1998)
- FQ Men (2004 to 2007)
- Miss FQ (2017 to 2018)
- FQ Living (2023 to 2023)
