= The New Zealand Times =

New Zealand newspaper (1874–1927)

The New Zealand Times was a daily newspaper published in Wellington, New Zealand, from 1874 to 1927.

== Background ==
The newspaper was founded by Julius Vogel, who had had involvement with newspapers as an editor or owner since his goldfield days in Dunolly, Victoria, in 1856. Vogel was a correspondent for The Melbourne Argus before he edited the Dunolly Advertiser, which became the Maryborough and Dunolly Advertiser. He then founded the Inglewood and Sandy Creek Advertiser. When the Victorian gold rush lost its momentum and after an unsuccessful attempt to enter the Victorian Parliament in the Avoca district in August 1861, Vogel moved to Dunedin. There, he worked for the Otago Colonist but within a short time, he co-founded the Otago Daily Times. Vogel owned the newspaper until 1866 when it was taken over by a company, but stayed on as editor for another two years. When he lost the editorship, he set up a competing newspaper, the New Zealand Sun. This newspaper failed within a few months, and Vogel became editor and general manager of the Daily Southern Cross in Auckland in April 1869. His family moved from Dunedin in May 1869.

In October 1873, Vogel set up The New Zealand Times Newspaper Company Ltd. His co-directors were Joseph Dransfield, George Hunter, Walter Johnston, Fredrich August Krull (German Consul), and Edward William Mills). Later that year, this company bought The Wellington Independent.

== History ==
The first issue of The New Zealand Times was published on 1 June 1874. In its editorial and via the newspaper's masthead, it was announced that this publication would now incorporate The Wellington Independent. Like its predecessor, it was a daily morning paper. Vogel's idea was to establish a national newspaper, but this did not happen.

Chantrey Harris bought the newspaper in 1880 and owned it until 1890, when he sold to William Baldwin. When Baldwin decided to retire to Australia the Liberal Party purchased the newspaper from him. John Ballance and William Pember Reeves were directors during that time. Competition arrived in 1907 with The Dominion, another morning newspaper but conservative-leaning. William Geddis bought the newspaper in 1912. The Dominion won the market and its parent company, the Wellington Publishing Company, bought The New Zealand Times and shut it down. The last edition was published on Saturday, 29 January 1927.

== Contributors ==
Notable contributors to The New Zealand Times include:

- Ebenezer Fox
- Leonard Cronin
