= The Northern Advocate =

Regional newspaper in Whangārei, New Zealand

- Type: Daily/Morning (except Sunday)
- Format: Monday to Friday: tabloid, Saturday: broadsheet
- Owner(s): NZME
- Editor: Rachel Ward
- Founded: 1875
- Headquarters: Whangārei
- Circulation: 11,406
- ISSN: 1170-0769
- Website: www.nzherald.co.nz/northern-advocate/

The Northern Advocate is the regional daily paper for the city of Whangārei and the Northland Region in New Zealand.

== History ==
The Whangarei Comet and Northern Advertiser was founded in 1875 as a weekly paper by George Alderton and, despite a small population which led to a prediction the paper "would go up like a comet, and come down like a stick", the paper flourished and within two years had expanded to 12 pages and become the Northern Advocate and General Advertiser, with a small section printed in Māori. The paper began daily publication in 1902. On Monday, 23 April 2012, the weekday Northern Advocate changed to tabloid format.

After a long period of decline, owner NZME announced in 2024 that major staff cuts would be made to the Advocate alongside other regional newspapers.

== Other publications ==
=== The Whangarei Report ===
The Whangarei Report is a weekly tabloid-format community paper, delivered free on Thursdays to all homes south of the Brynderwyns, across to Dargaville and north to Ōakura, Northland.

=== The Northland Age ===
The Northland Age is a twice-weekly broadsheet community paper, delivered free on Tuesdays and Thursdays to all retailers and homes in Kerikeri, the Bay of Islands area down to Moerewa in the south.
