= Gisborne Herald =

Newspaper published in Gisborne, New Zealand

The Gisborne Herald
- Type: Daily/Evening
- Format: Tabloid
- Owner(s): NZME
- Editor: Jeremy Muir
- Founded: 1874
- Headquarters: Gisborne
- Circulation: 8,586
- ISSN: 1170-0432
- Website: Official website

The Gisborne Herald is the daily evening newspaper for Gisborne and environs. It was one of only four independently owned daily newspapers in New Zealand but was bought by NZME in 2024.

== History ==
Established in 1874 as the Poverty Bay Herald it was published biweekly in the morning by Carlile and Co. In 1877 it was taken over by Poverty Bay Printing and Publishing Co., who turned it into an evening paper. In June 1875, publishing began tri-weekly, and changed again in October 1878 to become a daily paper. The Poverty Bay Herald Co. Ltd. (now the Gisborne Herald Co. Ltd.) was formed in 1908. The paper was renamed The Gisborne Herald in 1939.

In 1999 it changed from a broadsheet to a tabloid format, making it New Zealand's only daily tabloid newspaper.

In mid March 2024, the Gisborne Herald and its website were acquired by NZME. Since 1987, NZME had owned a minority stake in The Gisborne Herald Company.
