= Julian Batchelor =

New Zealand anti-co-governance activist

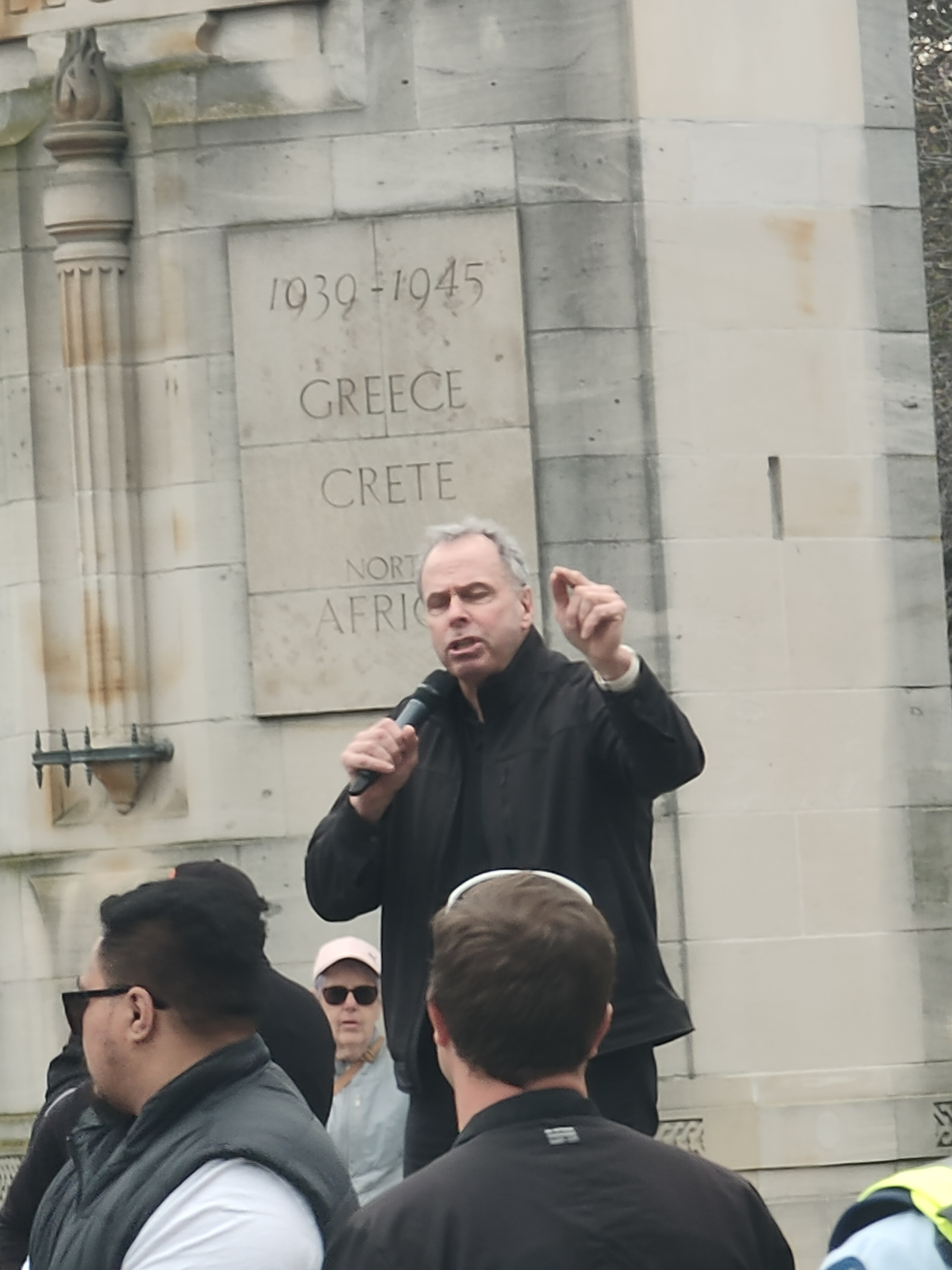
Julian Batchelor speaking at a rally in Christchurch. September 2023

Julian Geoffrey Peter Batchelor (born 4 May 1958) is a New Zealand Christian evangelist, writer and blogger who led the controversial nationwide 2023 "Stop Co-governance" roadshow, which was accused of promoting hostility towards Māori people and disinformation about co-governance.

== Early life and religious conversion ==
Batchelor was born in Kenya on 4 May 1958, where his parents lived during the colonial period. Kenya was granted independence by Britain in 1963. Batchelor emigrated with his parents from Britain to New Zealand in 1967. He studied educational psychology at Massey University's Palmerston North campus from 1980 to 1985 where he underwent a born again experience in 1982 and converted to Christianity. He attended Palmerston North Teachers' College (1983–1985). Although he initially considered becoming a Roman Catholic priest, Batchelor became an evangelical Christian. He obtained a degree in theology from New Zealand's Laidlaw College (1988–1990). He regards Anglican theologian J.I. Packer, Anglican cleric and theologian John Stott, and theologian, Anglican priest, and Christian apologist Michael Green as his faith heroes.

== Evangelical activities ==
Around 1992, Batchelor left his brief teaching career of about two years and became a Christian evangelist, believing that God had called him to share the Christian Gospel with other New Zealanders. He spent about ten years writing his book Evangelism: Strategies from Heaven in the War for Souls that was published in 2006, which articulated the evangelical Christian view that there was a battle between the forces of light and darkness for human souls.

In 2007, Batchelor established the Evangelism Strategies International Christian charity, of which he is the director, to promote his evangelical ministry. Batchelor criticised mainstream Christianity for allegedly downplaying the doctrine of Hell, and he also criticised the Anglican Church of New Zealand for its alleged pro-gay agenda. Journalist Matthew Scott has likened Batchelor's evangelical zeal to American televangelists Billy Graham and Joel Osteen. According to Otago Daily Times columnist Jean Balchin, Batchelor subscribes to a binary evangelical Christian worldview of good versus evil which framed his political views on Māori social and cultural objectives and co-governance.

== Oke Bay Lodge dispute ==
In 2008, Batchelor purchased Oke Bay Lodge at Rawhiti in the eastern Bay of Islands. With the help of mainly voluntary labour from Christian colleagues, Batchelor restored the two-storey villa and established a Christian retreat that would serve as accommodation for visitors to the Cape Brett track. To fund the development and restoration of the Lodge, Batchelor briefly became a real estate agent for Barfoot & Thompson in Auckland and Whangārei. By 2016, Batchelor had established a multimillion-dollar property portfolio.

In late 2015, Batchelor became locked in a dispute with local Rawhiti residents over the construction of a conspicuous 3-metre-high retaining wall at the frontage to the Lodge that is next to a public road and the sea. Although Batchelor had obtained resource consent to build the wall, a local group called "Te Komiti o te Kaitiaki o Opourua" petitioned the Far North District Council (FNDC) to take action against Batchelor over alleged by-law breaches of the council's consent and adverse impact on the local environment and wāhi tapu (sites of cultural significance to local Māori). Key complaints to FNDC against Batchelor included that his retaining wall was constructed on unstable land; he had removed or heavily pruned very old and culturally-important pohutukawa trees next to the road; his earthworks polluted the beach during a storm; and his activities and land changes around the Lodge had disrupted Māori access to a culturally-important cemetery. In December 2015, Council staff inspected the site and found that work on the retaining wall failed to fully comply with the FNDC consent and other work on the property was undertaken without consent. Despite being ordered to stop work, Batchelor's contractor continued to work on the retaining wall during the 2015–2016 Christmas break. Batchelor was also requested to carry out an archaeological assessment of the Lodge property after Heritage New Zealand said it contained several archaeological sites associated with "living platforms".

The FNDC issued Batchelor and his company (Gracealone Oke Bay Holdings) four infringement notices for non-compliance totalling NZ$3,000. Although Batchelor had appealed against two of the fines, he missed the 28-day deadline for the other two. On 10 August 2020, the FNDC took him to court for non-payment of fines. Since the court was preoccupied with a murder trial, Judge Greg Davis requested Batchelor and the FNDC resolve their differences out of court. As part of the settlement, Batchelor and his company agreed on 12 August 2020 to pay a total of $1,500 to the FNDC.

In July 2020, a local iwi (tribe) applied for Heritage New Zealand to designate parts of his land as wāhi tapu. Batchelor said that he did not see the notifications from Heritage New Zealand before it approved the application in March 2022, after which he lodged an objection. He considered that designation to be equivalent to someone gaining unauthorised control of his land. He decided at that moment to channel his energy into anti co-governance activism, stating that "I'm mobilizing. That's enough - 14 years of living in tribal rule. It's absolute hell. And if this is what's coming to New Zealand, I need to go and warn people".

== Political activism ==
=== Anti-gay protests ===
In 1997, Batchelor organised an anti-gay letter-writing campaign and over 200 letters arrived at Auckland City Council protesting the Hero Parade. In 1999, he co-founded and acted as spokesperson for a local chapter of American organization Stop Promoting Homosexuality. In 2000, Batchelor used images of Martin Luther King, Dame Whina Cooper, Mother Teresa and Mahatma Gandhi to protest against gay rights in Auckland. Both Cooper's family and King's Estate expressed upset that their images had been used without permission.

=== General elections ===
Batchelor was the New Zealand First candidate in the Mount Albert electorate in the 2005 New Zealand general election. He gained fourth place, winning 1,089 votes. The electorate was retained by Prime Minister Helen Clark. Batchelor was reported in 2022 to still be a member of the New Zealand First Party. His presentation at the Party's annual conference in Christchurch on 16 October 2022 stated that he had been "... on the other end of apartheid" because he claimed that "some of his land in the Bay of Islands had been classified as Māori land and that Pākehā are being oppressed". He also wanted English to be the official language in New Zealand to stop it being erased by Te Reo.

=== Stop Co-Governance tour ===
In August 2022, Batchelor launched a "Stop Co-Governance Tour" roadshow tour of New Zealand, claiming that co-governance measures that had been derived from an interpretation of the Treaty of Waitangi, along with Māori electorates and Māori wards, were anti-democratic and racially divisive. His roadshow was controversial, with critics accusing Batchelor of promoting anti-Māori racism and disinformation about the Government's co-governance policies. His meetings were attended by predominantly older, European New Zealanders.

Batchelor claimed the media's participation in the government's $55 million Public Interest Journalism Fund contractually obliged the media to "push the government narrative" on Māori issues and deliberately to mislead the public on the meaning and intention of the Treaty of Waitangi. Batchelor failed to substantiate his claim that the media had "twisted, contorted and fraudulently manipulated the Treaty to give elite Māori massive wealth and assets that belong to all New Zealanders".

Batchelor claimed that co-governance was part of a conspiracy by so-called "elite Māori" to take over New Zealand; that policies supporting Māori as Treaty partners constituted apartheid; and that Māori were over-represented in the New Zealand Parliament. H advocates racial equality and "one man, one vote". He has opposed efforts to promote the Māori language and to rename New Zealand "Aotearoa". Batchelor claimed that teaching children the Māori language amounted to child abuse and he likened the Māori phrase Kia Ora (meaning "hello") to the Nazi salute "Sieg heil". He referred to the diabolical behaviour of dictators in his talks in order to motivate his audience to reject co-governance by instilling fear.

Batchelor said there was "fraud and corruption" around the Treaty of Waitangi. He denied allegations of racism and claimed he was opposed to race-based legislation. Batchelor had previously filed a submission opposing the Rotorua District Council Representation Arrangements Bill that proposed local council have an equal number of Māori and general ward seats. Batchelor and others argued that Māori councillors needed to be elected, stating that "it was the democratic way of doing it". The council had withdrawn its support for the Bill on 23 February 2023.

Batchelor's Stop Co-Governance meetings in 2023 in many locations were picketed by protesters and attended by police including in Dargaville (9 March), Kerikeri (12 March), Orewa (18 March), Hastings (24 July), Whangārei (6 August). Protestors wanted Batchelor's remarks fact-checked. Batchelor's supporters at his meeting in Palmerston North called for protestors to be evicted from his meeting or became physically hostile toward protestors.

Batchelor and his co-organizers of meeting appeared to selectively exclude Māori from meetings. Batchelor denied he was being racist but claimed that he only denied entry to "activists" or those that were not "good Māori" who would listen and be respectful. Batchelor recalled, however, that the crowd in Picton was "fully supportive" of his remarks and "there was not one Maori in the crowd".

A petition organised by Kaipara District Council Māori ward councillor Pera Paniora that gathered 1700 signatories in 24 hours requested Attorney-General David Parker take action against Batchelor for allegedly inciting racial disharmony as a result of his "misinformation, lies and insults toward Maori".

Reports of protest against Batchelor's tour in 2023 led venue owners to cancel his venue reservations in many locations including Rotorua (30 April), Dunedin (17 June), Picton and Blenheim (21 July), New Plymouth (25 July) which led to alternative venues or the use of a tent. Batchelor claimed his supporters had made the booking in good faith and he criticised the actions of the protesters for taking away his right to free speech. Batchelor "video-streamed" his meeting from private accommodation when venues were not available, which he reported increased his audience size considerably compared to holding a meeting in a physical venue.

Venues were cancelled by owners often at short notice who typically cited safety reasons for their decision. Batchelor criticized venue owners for cancelling on his blog. He published the venue owner's contact details and photograph and encouraged his followers to send an email to them objecting to their decision. Batchelor was also critical of the police when he considered they had not adequately protected him and meeting attendees. The contact details of the police person in charge at the time and their photo was published on his blog, and Batchelor encouraged his followers to send an email to them and to the Minister of Police to complain about the inadequate police presence at his meetings.

Some local mayors voiced support for and against Batchelor's tour. The mayor of Clutha District Bryan Cadogan, for example, said that he was not welcome in Balclutha and he denied Batchelor a venue. An online petition called for the mayor to apologise for his alleged "poor behaviour and cancellation of free speech". The mayor of Invercargill expressed support for the tour. At the meeting, Batchelor said that he had been told that his supporters had purchased guns and he called for peace. The mayor of the Kaipara District Council invited Batchelor to summarise his tour at a local council meeting, despite objections to his presence by council attendees. Batchelor advised that 350,000 of his "Stop Co-Governance" booklets had been published and distributed.

The Electoral Commission alleged in August 2023 that Batchelor's 31-page booklet breached electoral advertising laws during the lead-up to the 2023 New Zealand general election because the name and address of the promoter was not stated. Batchelor considered the infringement "extremely minor" and "difficult to prove in court". The Electoral Commission referred the matter to the police. Batchelor amended the online version of the booklet on 1 September 2023 with an official promoter statement, but he was unable to add a promoter statement to booklets already published and distributed.

On 10 August 2023 and in an effort to counter the disinformation provided in Batchelor's Stop Co-Governance roadshow, Taranaki Cathedral's Dean Jay Ruka announced that he would convene meetings with the local community to discuss the benefits of co-governance and the Treaty of Waitangi.

DB Breweries distanced itself from several Stop Co-Governance billboards that had appropriated the company's "Yeah, right" catchphrase. Batchelor's billboards that were erected on roadsides in various locations had slogans such as "Co-governance is in the Treaty" and "No cultural group receives special rights in NZ" alongside the sceptical catchphrase "Yeah, right".

Batchelor held about 60 Stop Co-Governance meetings from February to September 2023. Stop Co-Governance also held protest marches some 2–3 weeks before the general election in Christchurch (16 September 2023), Auckland (23 September 2023) and in the capital Wellington (28 and 30 September 2023). Many roads close to parliament were closed as a safety precaution, which disrupted traffic and inconvenienced many shop owners and workers in central Wellington. Batchelor provided his views against co-governance at Destiny Church in Auckland. Batchelor joined with Destiny Church leader Brian Tamaki in the protest march on 28 September 2023, which ended with a political rally in support of Tamaki's The Freedoms & Rights Coalition and Convoy Coalition against the United Nations' 2030 Agenda and transgender rights. The march was met by a small group of counter protesters from Pōneke Anti-Fascist Coalition. All of the Stop Co-Governance marches contained far fewer marchers than Batchelor's goal of 300,000 to 400,000 people. The second march in Wellington comprised 30-100 of Batchelor's supporters who were well-outnumbered by counter-protesters, including Pōneke Anti-Fascist Coalition and Christian leaders opposed to his message. The Stop Co-Governance protesters sang the national anthem God Defend New Zealand in English but not Māori.

Issues highlighted by New Zealand's anti co-governance movement were recently summarised and compared with Australia's "Indigenous Voice to Parliament" referendum. The New Zealand First and ACT New Zealand parties have objected to the co-governance arrangements currently in place because they are 'divisive and undemocratic', and one has called for a referendum on the issue. However, Professor Dominic O'Sullivan from Charles Sturt University stated that Batchelor's objections to co-governance "did not have any foundation in democratic principles or inclusion – they are purely racist".

Batchelor's "Vision 2023-2026" strategy included the development of an on-line teaching resource for discussion by small groups whose purpose would be to "counter the government's narrative on the Treaty, to inform the public regularly about key issues of co-governance and to raise an army of 100's of thousands who would be willing to go into battle to stop co-governance completely at the next election in 2026". Batchelor's goal would be to have 1000 groups meeting regularly in homes by the end of 2024.

=== Defamation suit against TVNZ and Dr Hattotuwa ===
Batchelor advised on 9 September 2023 that he would file a defamation lawsuit against TVNZ and The Disinformation Project director Dr Sanjana Hattotuwa, who had allegedly accused him of inciting racism against Māori people. Batchelor claimed the comments were hurtful and false. He sought a payment of $50,000 and a public apology.

Batchelor's legal action was funded by Canadian New Zealander billionaire and private equity investor Jim Grenon. A hearing took place at the Auckland District Court in December 2025. Broadcaster Peter Williams testified during the proceedings. On 24 March 2026, Justice David Clark dismissed Batchelor's defamation claim against TVNZ and Dr Hattotuwa, ruling in favour of the broadcaster's defence based on truth, honest opinion and responsible communication. Clark also found Grenon liable to pay for Batchelor's legal fees and directed that a case management conference be held on 3 April 2026 to discuss whether Grenon wanted to be heard in Batchelor's case. On 28 May 2026, Clark rejected Grenon's lawyer Chris Patterson's bid to stop media coverage of Grenon's involvement as a "non-party," citing "genuine public interest" in the case.

On 3 July 2026, Clark ordered Grenon and Batchelor to pay $128,818.65 to TVNZ and $107,137 to Hattotuwa in legal costs. Clark also ordered the plaintiffs to pay further costs for additional submissions. He found that Grenon had instigated Batchelor's legal proceedings against TVNZ and Hattotuwa by providing a lawyer, and had sought to hide his involvement in Batchelor's proceedings against the defendants.
