= Rotorua Daily Post =

Regional New Zealand newspaper

- Type: Daily/Morning (except Sunday) Newspaper
- Format: Compact
- Owner: NZME
- Editor: Scott Inglis
- Founded: 1885
- Headquarters: Rotorua, New Zealand
- Circulation: 10,550
- ISSN: 1170-0254
- Website: www.nzherald.co.nz/rotorua-daily-post/

The Rotorua Daily Post is the regional newspaper for central North Island of New Zealand including the greater Rotorua area as well as Taupō and the surrounding areas.

== History ==
The paper was founded in 1885 as the Hot Lakes Chronicle, and received a major scoop when it covered the eruption of Mount Tarawera in June 1886. It was founded by a Mr Watt, and upon his death his wife took over. She in turn sold it to Mr David Gardner, who emigrated from Queensland, in 1905. Gardner's sons, Robin and Russell, took over upon his death in 1918. Originally published weekly, the Hot Lakes Chronicle was published twice a week by Gardner in an effort to stave off competition from a rival paper.

In 1931, the Rotorua Chronicle became the Rotorua Morning Post; in 1947 becoming the Rotorua Post; in 1960 becoming part of the United Publishing and Printing newspaper group; and in 1964, became the Rotorua Daily Post.

Originally a broadsheet, the paper was reissued in a new compact format in 2013

== Other publications ==
The Rotorua Daily Post also publishes:

=== Rotorua Weekender ===
Rotorua Weekender is a weekly paper delivered free each Friday to all homes in the greater Rotorua area.

=== Whakatane News ===
The Whakatane News is delivered free every Thursday to all homes in the greater Eastern Bay of Plenty region.

=== The Taupo & Turangi Weekender ===
The Taupo & Turangi Weekender is a free weekly paper delivered to each home in the greater Taupo and Turangi area.

=== Thermal Air ===
Thermal Air is a weekly tourist guide to the region's attractions. It is delivered to information sites across New Zealand as well as all accommodation in Rotorua and its surrounds.

=== Hamilton News ===
Hamilton News was delivered weekly on a Friday to Hamilton and the surrounding area, until May 2020, when it became Waikato News.

=== Te Awamutu Courier ===
The Te Awamutu Courier was a biweekly community newspaper published on Tuesdays and Thursdays. It closed at the end of 2024.

==== History ====
Te Awamutu's first newspaper was Te Pihoihoi Mokemoke, in te reo Māori, edited by John Eldon Gorst, and published to counter the influence of the Māori King’s newspaper, Te Hokioi. Only 5 issues had been published in February and March 1863, before a Ngāti Maniapoto group seized the printing press.

The Waipa Post was started on 18 April 1911 by Arthur George Warburton (1888–1956), a former New Zealand Herald worker. From 17 April 1936 it was renamed Te Awamutu Courier due to increased use of the name Te Awamutu for the area, rather than Waipa. When Arthur Warburton died, his son, George, became manager, followed by his son, John, in 1986, who remained as manager until 2008, though the paper was sold to Wilson and Horton (now NZME) in 1992. Until 1998 the Courier employed 35 people to print newspapers, books, magazines, invitations, flyers, etc. In 2014 the Courier moved from Alexandra Street to Sloane Street. In 2018 a new free weekly newspaper started on Tuesdays, reviving the Waipa Post name, but, after a brief ban on non-daily newspapers during the Covid-19 lockdown, the Post again ended. In December 2024 NZME confirmed the loss of 29 jobs and 14 North Island local papers by Christmas, including the Te Awamutu Courier, due to less advertising and higher distribution costs. The other papers to be closed were the Hauraki-Coromandel Post, Katikati Advertiser, Te Puke Times, Napier Courier, Hastings Leader, Hawke’s Bay’s CHB Mail, Stratford Press, Tararua’s Bush Telegraph, Whanganui Midweek, Manawatū Guardian, Horowhenua Chronicle and Kāpiti News, but some, such as Taupō & Tūrangi Herald, which was bought out by its editor, survived.
