= Remix (fashion magazine) =

New Zealand magazine

- Editor: Amber Baker
- Categories: Fashion, pop culture, beauty, lifestyle, entertainment
- Frequency: Quarterly
- Circulation: 100,000
- Publisher: Tim Phin
- First issue: November 1, 1997
- Company: Remix Media Ltd
- Country: New Zealand
- Based in: Auckland, Los Angeles
- Language: English
- Website: remixmagazine.com
- ISSN: 1175-1401

Remix Magazine is a quarterly fashion magazine established in November 1997 in New Zealand and now distributed around the world. The content is predominantly fashion, beauty, pop culture and entertainment conveyed through original editorial and photography.

Published independently by Remix Media Ltd, Remix magazine has two titles; A New Zealand edition released throughout Australasia quarterly and an international edition released throughout the United States and Europe twice yearly. Founder and owner Tim Phin remains the publisher. The current editor is Amber Baker.
