= The New Zealand Charity and Legal Gazette =

The New Zealand Charity and Legal Gazette was an annual compendium of organisations and bodies dedicated to the betterment of humankind, the animal world and the environment. First published in 1975 under the editorship of Wellington lawyer George Joseph, the editorship then passed to journalist Nadoo Balantine Scott and, in 2001, to broadcaster and publisher Michael Woolf, who introduced an online supplement - the New Zealand Charity and Legal Internet Gazette - in 2003.

The New Zealand Charity and Legal Gazette magazine was distributed gratis to every law practice in New Zealand, and to the offices of the Public Trust, Guardian Trust, Perpetual Trustees, banks and other interested parties. It was primarily used by the legal profession to help donors in an understanding of the roles and ethos of each listed organisation.

The Gazette ceased publication in 2016, following the death of editor and publisher Michael Woolf.
