= The Disinformation Project =

Misinformation research group in New Zealand

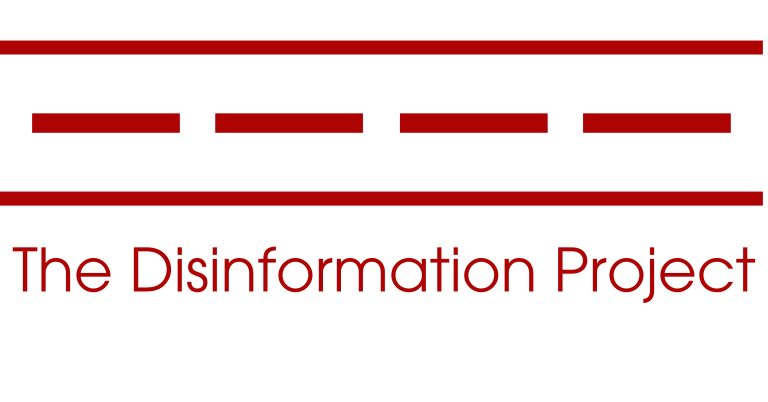
- Products: Publicly available research, disinformation resources
- Country: New Zealand
- Key people: Kate Hannah (Director); Sanjana Hattotuwa (Research Director); Nicole Skews-Poole (Director of Communications)
- Established: February 2020
- Disestablished: 3 October 2024
- Status: Defunct
- Website: thedisinfoproject.org

The Disinformation Project was a research group studying the effects of disinformation in the context of the COVID-19 pandemic in New Zealand. The research group was established in 2020 to combat disinformation during the COVID-19 pandemic but subsequently expanded its scope to cover other "conspiracy theory beliefs" including anti-vaccine, climate change denial, anti-immigration, the anti-gender movement, anti-Māori racism and hatred towards the LGBTQ+ community. The Disinformation Project also took an interest in monitoring neo-Nazism, far right activism, antisemitism and Islamophobia.

== Background ==
The Disinformation Project was an independent, interdisciplinary and non-governmental New Zealand research team that collected and analysed data on the causes and impact of mis- and disinformation within the country's society from the early days of the COVID-19 pandemic in 2020 through to, and beyond, the 2022 Wellington protest when the grounds of Parliament House and surrounding streets were occupied by anti-vaccine and anti-mandate groups. It was led by social historian Kate Hannah.

The project claimed its research identified how the digital world, shaped by social media platforms globally, has the potential to make elements of a society more vulnerable to disinformation and social exclusion. Hannah has acknowledged the importance of showing empathy toward people who are "hoodwinked into extremist beliefs."

== Methodology and positions ==
The Disinformation Project's research used mixed methods which combined open and quantitative data from social media platforms, social and mainstream media and other forms of information-sharing, looking for patterns and meaning in super-spreader events and qualitative research and discourse analysis to identify shifts over time.

Key to the project's approach was researching and assessing how scientific uncertainty, due to the presentation and distribution of unreliable information within the context of an infodemic, could manifest as narratives that linked to conspiracy theories. The project held that while some people might have genuine reasons to be wary of the state and mainstream media, they could be influenced by those holding conspiracy theories or extremist beliefs in social media spaces that appeared to offer support, but are often driven by groups with different agendas. The position is therefore taken that "those most marginalised by or disaffected within contemporary society, are more likely to have lived experiences that might make them more susceptible to unreliable sources and untrustworthy stories."

Exploring what Hannah has described as a "shared information landscape", underpinned the research of the project into how New Zealand society understood and managed the infodemic that has come to the fore as a result of COVID-19. The project's work emphasized the impact of colonisation on the health and wellbeing of individuals and communities, increasing their vulnerability to mis- and disinformation.

The researchers took the position that the lack of a shared narrative can shape how a country understands and builds its "historical memory", with the storming of the Capitol in the United States in January 2021 as an example of how contemporary myths such as conspiracy theories can cause different groups to interpret events in different ways. As events such as these began to influence the international information landscape, the researchers contended that their work was to help New Zealand develop values that are "democratic, inclusive, and progressive" to consolidate social cohesion built on trust and cooperation. The potential of the Treaty of Waitangi to enable a partnership is cited as a "necessary starting point for any discussion or development of a strategy which seeks to address and make redress for the impacts of online harm, hateful and violent extremism, and disinformation for New Zealand...[and]...it is from a position of the partnership that Te Tiriti provides that Aotearoa can make a global contribution to these pressing and immediate issues."

Hannah warned against increasing censorship as a way to manage disinformation, expressing the importance of people being "self-regulating...[talking to each other]...at an interpersonal community-based level."

== Distrust in authority and disinformation ==
During the first six months of the project, researchers observed disinformation fueled a growing distrust in government and health officials in New Zealand. Disconnected from their local communities, some people relied more often on online spaces where they might feel informed and respected, but were also more exposed to disinformation and extremist views.

Starting in August 2020, the group took a wider approach of studying mis- and disinformation ecosystems in New Zealand, focusing on "dangerous speech, hateful expression, and criminal behaviour" and how these aligned with "global trends, themes, narratives, and actors who influence online harms in Aotearoa." They observed a shift from vaccine hesitancy to vaccine resistance, as well as the normalisation of online and offline harassment.

Reports published by the project in 2021 and 2022 observe an acceleration of the trend toward normalization of hate the criminal behaviour on a variety of social media platforms, especially against minority groups, notably Māori, other ethnic minorities, women and gender minorities, LGBTQ+ people, and those with disabilities. Common far-right disinformation about COVID-19 and public health was becoming more popular, opening the way for to influence public opinion on issues such as gun control, Māori sovereignty land rights, free speech, abortion, euthanasia and cannabis law reform. Hannah suggested that "minimization of Covid-19 has been like a Trojan horse...it has become a really significant recruitment tool and then has created an ability to coalesce around a set of ideas that are against the state."

== Occupation of the New Zealand Parliament grounds 2022 ==
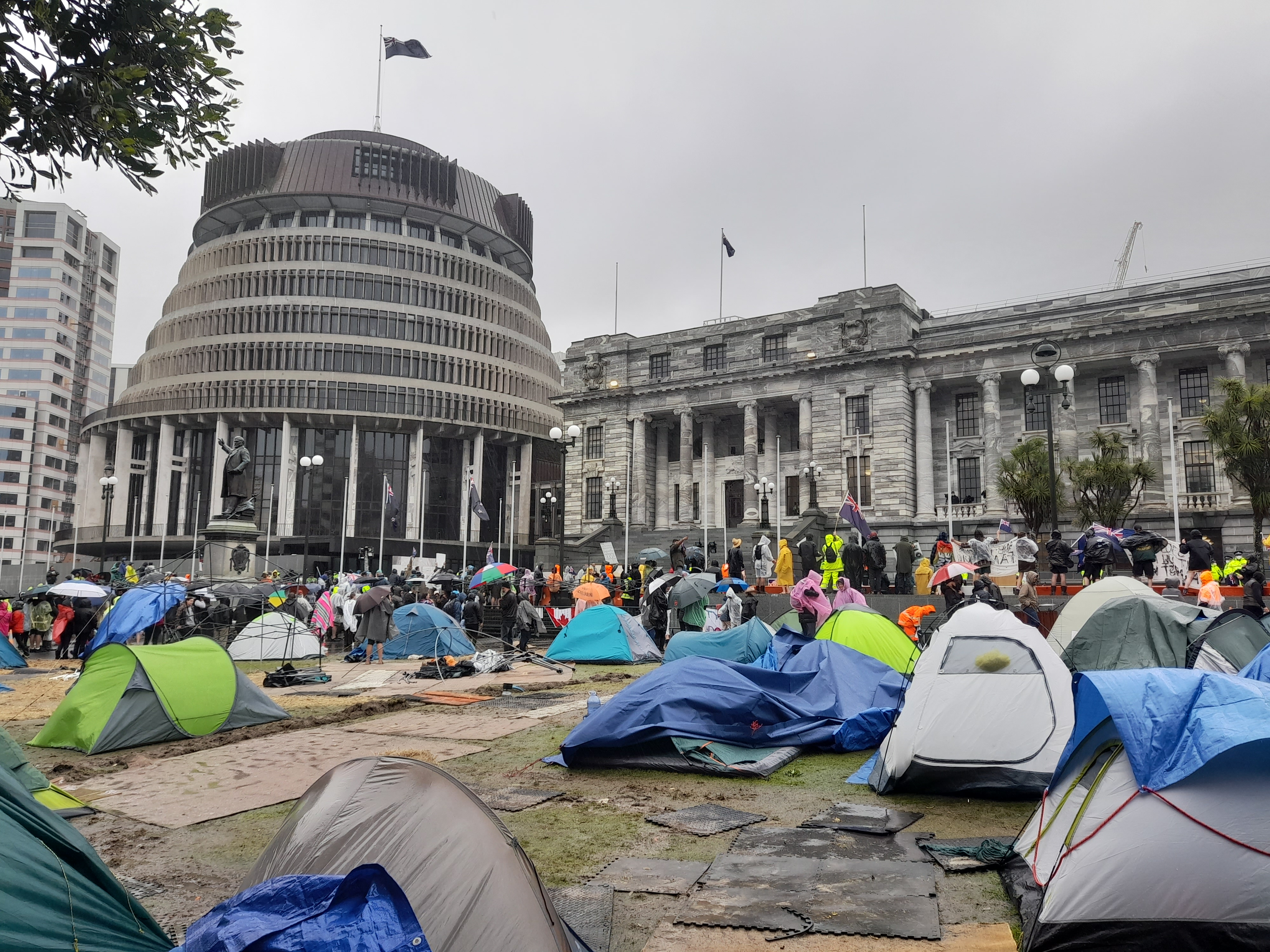
Occupation, 13 February 2022

After the initial occupation in February 2022, the Disinformation Project monitored social media and identified a small group of people responsible for the spreading of the majority of false information during and after the event. The researchers claimed that during the occupation a great number of New Zealanders were exposed through social media to a "splintered reality...[and pushed toward]...racist and violent ideologies." After a clash between police and protestors on 2 March, the data showed a strong increase in engagement with disinformation content, with 73 per cent of Facebook interactions over misinformation and disinformation originating with twelve accounts.

Hannah concluded that for a large number of New Zealanders, their vision of key events was constructed from disinformation, including "extreme misogyny and racism, (...) anti-Māori, Islamophobic and antisemitic sentiment". In May 2022, the project's Kayli Taylor expressed concerns, based on data, that "the Parliament Protest [had] entrenched violent expression...toxic masculinities, and other hallmarks of dangerous speech as the norm within anti-mandate and anti-vaccine social media ecologies", effectively undermining "civic life, political culture, and inclusion – pillars of social cohesion." Journalist Toby Manhire in a comprehensive coverage of the project's research, insisted super-spreaders of misinformation and conspiracy theory outstripped mainstream outlets in reaching online audiences.

The Project's work showed propagation of foreign propaganda using anti-vaccine activist networks. As Russian-linked propaganda and disinformation was being reported at the occupation site,, Disinformation Project Research Fellow Sanjana Hattotuwa, used monitoring of more than 100 Telegram channels and dozens of Facebook, YouTube, Instagram and Twitter accounts" to show that the Russian invasion of Ukraine was one of the two dominant topics in New Zealand anti-vaccination forums and the discussion was pro-Putin. Anti-government rhetoric from protest leaders was also strongly present.

A two-day event where project researchers and independent academics were scheduled to present information sessions on political disinformation in November 2022 was initially canceled when protestors were seen organizing online to disrupt it. Hannah had already received death threats and believed she, with other experts, was on a list of people to be executed for supporting public health measures.

== Threat to local democracy ==
In August 2022, Disinformation Project researcher Sanjana Hattotuwa said peddlers of disinformation were organizing to hide their affiliations and stand for councils and school Boards of Trustees. The number of candidates running for public office, discouraged by the racism and other forms of harassment experienced by elected council members, appeared to present an opportunity for fringe candidates who could hide their affiliations. Hattotuwa worried that "new foundations" for disinformation had now been laid in New Zealand and would change how the country engaged with elections in the future.

While only two candidates with connections to conspiracy theories or misinformation were elected in the Southern region of the country, Hattotuwa warned that this new possible threat should not be underestimated.

== Antisemitism and Islamophobia ==
Following the outbreak of the Gaza war in 7 October 2023, Hannah reported a sharp rise in both antisemitic and Islamophobic rhetoric on various platforms including X (formerly Twitter), Instagram, Snapchat, TikTok and various gaming platforms that were popular with young people. She warned that the conflation of ethnic and religious identities with racist and xenophobic stereotypes and misinformation increased animosity and division both online and offline in New Zealand.

== Controversies ==
In September 2023, political activist Julian Batchelor indicated he filed a defamation suit against Research Director Sanjana Hattotuwa, for asserting that Batchelor was inciting racism against Māori people in an interview with TVNZ.

Kate Hannah and media company Stuff were also the subject of a lawsuit filed by "independent journalist" and influencer Chantelle Baker, who alleged that the two parties defamed her in Stuff's 2022 documentary Fire and Fury by saying that she promoted disinformation during the 2022 Wellington protest. While Baker subsequently settled a similar lawsuit against The New Zealand Herald in late September 2024, she announced that she would file a new lawsuit against Hannah and Stuff for defamation.

== Closure ==
On 3 October 2024, The Disinformation Project announced its closure as its team members Sanjana Hattutowa, Kate Hannah and Nicole Skews-Poole moved on to other ventures. In its closing statement, the group claimed that the various anti-COVID vaccine and lockdown, anti-Māori, anti-LGBTQ+ and other "disinformation networks" were "deeply connected" to various domestic and foreign far-right, neo-Nazi and "accelerationist" actors.

== Selected publications ==
- Working Paper: Mis- and disinformation in Aotearoa New Zealand from 17 August to 5 November 2021 (2021). This research is an observation and analysis on data related to COVID-19 that is readily available to the public of New Zealand. The conclusion reached, is that from August 2021, there had been a considerable increase in COVID-specific disinformation and the spread of far-right ideologies and that posed a threat to safety and inclusion in New Zealand society.
- The murmuration of information disorders Aotearoa New Zealand’s mis- and dis-information ecologies and the Parliament Protest (2022). This paper extended the examination begun in November 2021 into the tactics used by the demonstrators during the 2022 Wellington protest to disseminate mis- and dis-information that led to "a set of tipping points: shifts from vaccine hesitancy to vaccine resistance, increasingly competing ideas regarding state versus individual rights, and the normalisation of the targeting of individuals and communities with online and offline harassment". The authors concluded this "cannot be treated as a minor incursion to an otherwise equitable society...and...[r]enewing efforts for social cohesion, honouring Te Tiriti o Waitangi, and reflecting critically on our past, our shared present, and our ideas for the future must be the starting point to re-building trust in Aotearoa New Zealand in 2022 and beyond".

== See also ==
- Christchurch Call to Action Summit
- He Whenua Taurikura
