= New Zealand Media and Entertainment =

New Zealand media business

- Type: Public
- Traded as: NZX: NZM
- Industry: Radio broadcasting Print media E-commerce
- Predecessor: APN New Zealand; The Radio Network; GrabOne
- Founded: Auckland, New Zealand (2014; 12 years ago)
- Headquarters: Auckland, New Zealand
- Number of locations: 25 markets
- Area served: New Zealand
- Key people: Steven Joyce (chair); Michael Boggs (CEO); Jim Grenon (director)
- Services: Print media; The New Zealand Herald; Bay of Plenty Times; Rotorua Daily Post; Northern Advocate; The Aucklander; The Northland Age; Hawkes Bay Today; Whanganui Chronicle; The Whangarei Report; Waihi Leader; Katikati Advertiser; Bay News; Te Puke Times; Hamilton Times; Te Awamutu Courier; Rotorua Weekender; Whakatane News; Taupo & Turangi Weekender; Whanganui Mid Week; Horowhenua Chronicle; Stratford Press; Kapiti News; Hastings Leader; Napier Courier; Havelock North Village Press; Central Hawkes Bay Mail; Bush Telegram; Manawatu Guardian; Weekend Sun; Coast & Country News; New Farm Dairies; Gisborne Herald; Radio; Newstalk ZB; The Hits; ZM; Gold; Radio Hauraki; Flava; Coast; Hokonui; Gold Sport; Digital media; The New Zealand Herald; iHeartRadio; GrabOne; WatchMe; TheCountry; The New Zealand Herald Focus; SunLive
- Divisions: SunMedia
- Website: nzme.co.nz

New Zealand Media and Entertainment (abbreviated NZME) is a New Zealand newspaper, radio and digital media business. It was launched in 2014 as the merger of APN New Zealand (a division of APN News & Media), the Radio Network (formerly part of the Australian Radio Network) and GrabOne, one of New Zealand's biggest ecommerce websites.

NZME brands include flagship national newspaper The New Zealand Herald, and regional newspapers Bay of Plenty Times, Rotorua Daily Post, Hawke's Bay Today, Northern Advocate and Gisborne Herald. Its radio division operates multiple networks, including the country's largest commercial station Newstalk ZB, The Hits, ZM, Radio Hauraki, Flava, Coast, and Gold. The company owns the New Zealand rights to the iHeartRadio service. It also owns the Tauranga-based SunMedia company.

== History ==
=== Formation ===
NZME was formed in September 2014 through the merger of the New Zealand division of APN News & Media, APN New Zealand, The Radio Network, part of the Australian Radio Network, and GrabOne, one of New Zealand's largest ecommerce websites. The launch of the business fuelled speculation APN News and Media could be planning to fully separate its New Zealand operations, or issue an initial public offering for up to 60 percent of its New Zealand assets on the NZX. Fairfax Media declined to confirm speculation in The Australian Financial Review that it could buy some or all of those assets.

In June 2016, APN News & Media completed the demerger of NZME, and NZME was listed on the New Zealand Exchange on 27 June 2016.

=== Attempted acquisition of Stuff ===
In 2016, NZME and Stuff Ltd. proposed merging their operations in New Zealand, with Stuff's Australian parent company Fairfax Media receiving a 41% stake in the combine business plus $55 million cash. On 2 May 2017, the Commerce Commission declined to approve the proposed merger. The two companies appealed the Commissions' decision at the Wellington High Court, which upheld the commission's decision on 18 December 2017. In June 2018, the companies appealed the commission's decision at the New Zealand Court of Appeal, which rejected their merger bid on 25 September 2018. In October 2018, NZME and Stuff abandoned their first merger attempt.

In November 2019, NZME confirmed that it had entered into negotiations with Stuff's new Australian owners, Nine Entertainment, to purchase Stuff. As part of the second merger proposal, NZME proposed a "Kiwishare" arrangement that would ringfence Stuff's editorial operations and protect local journalism.

On 11 May 2020, NZME made a second attempt to purchase Stuff for NZ$1 under the pretext of saving jobs during the pandemic. In response, Nine Entertainment terminated further negotiations with NZME. In response, NZME filed an emergency injunction at the Auckland High Court to force Nine Entertainment back into negotiations. On 19 May, the Auckland High Court ruled against NZME's bid for an interim injunction against Nine Entertainment. On 25 May, Nine Entertainment sold Stuff to Stuff CEO Sinead Boucher.

=== 2020s job cuts ===
On 14 April 2020, NZME announced that they were making 15% of their workforce redundant (a loss of roughly 200 jobs) as a result of the economic fallout caused by the coronavirus pandemic.

In early June 2024, NZME proposed cutting 10 to 12 regional and community vacant roles across the country in order to reinvest in new regional roles.

In November 2024, NZME announced plans to eliminate 30 jobs and close 14 community newspapers, including Hauraki-Coromandel Post, Katikati Advertiser, Te Puke Times, Taupō & Tūrangi Herald, Napier Courier, Hastings Leader, CHB Mail, Stratford Press, Bush Telegraph, Whanganui Midweek, Manawatū Guardian, Horowhenua Chronicle and Kāpiti News.

In January 2025, NZME announced plans to eliminate 14 reporting and 24 production jobs as part of a restructuring process. These restructuring measures included merging news desks, producing fewer but more focused stories and developing a specialist print team. On 20 February, NZME confirmed plans to layoff several senior reporters and create a new Free ad-supported streaming television (FAST) channel. Notable staff members affected by the restructuring include political editor Claire Trevett, deputy business editor Grant Bradley, senior sports reporter Chris Rattue, science reporter Jamie Morton, investigative journalist Nicholas Jones, reporter Kirsty Wynn and social media head Mitch Powell. In late February 2025, NZME reported a net loss of NZ$16 million for the 2024 financial year after taking a non-cash write-down of NZ$24 million on its publishing assets.

=== 2024 acquisitions ===
On 5 March 2024, NZME acquired the Tauranga–based regional media company SunMedia for an undisclosed confidential sum. SunMedia was founded by Claire and Brian Rogers in 2001 and owned the SunLive website, the Weekend Sun, Coast & Country News and New Farm Dairies publications. On 12 March, the company acquired the Gisborne Herald and its website from the Muir family. NZME previously owned a 49% minority stake in the Gisborne Herald through the former New Zealand Herald publisher Wilson and Horton Ltd in 1987.

=== Use of artificial intelligence ===
In early August 2024, NZME admitted that it had used artificial intelligence to create editorials that appeared in the Weekend Herald and other publications as well as an editorial on MMA boxer Israel Adesanya. Following criticism, NZME's editor-in-chief Murray Kirkness stated that AI "was used in a way that fell short of its standards and more journalistic rigour would have been beneficial".

=== 2025 leadership changes ===
On 3 March 2025, Canadian private equity billionaire Jim Grenon, the founder of TOM Capital, acquired a 9.3 percent stake in NZME. Grenon owns the alternative media publications Centrist and NZ News Essentials (NZNE). On 6 March, Grenon wrote to NZME proposing to remove all the directors from the board and to replace them with new directors, including himself. On 21 March, NZME said that it had been in talks with Stuff since late 2024 to purchase several of its Wellington and South Island newspapers to try to boost its OneRoof business revenue and audience. However, these talks had been paused due to Grenon's takeover bid.

On 26 March, Grenon said that he was willing to compromise to appease shareholders opposing his plans, including appointing NZME CEO Michael Boggs to the company's new board, as long as Grenon himself became chair. Grenon had also nominated Des Gittings, Philip Crump, and Simon West as the three other new directors.

In early May 2025, former National Party MP and cabinet minister Steven Joyce was nominated to become a director and expressed willingness to replace Barbara Chapman as chair, ahead of NZME's annual shareholders meeting scheduled for 3 June 2025. On 2 June, Joyce succeeded Chapman as chair of NZME during a board meeting. Grenon was also appointed as the company's director during that same meeting. By late March 2026, Grenon had become the company's largest shareholder, acquiring 19.9% of the company's shares (1.78 million shares)

== Publishing ==
The publishing division of NZME reaches an estimated 2.1 million people each week by print, desktop computer and mobile. It includes national New Zealand Herald titles, six other daily newspapers, 23 non-daily newspapers and over 20 websites, mobile sites and apps.

=== New Zealand Herald ===
The New Zealand Herald is the flagship title of NZME and is the daily newspaper of Auckland. It has the largest circulation of any newspaper in New Zealand, peaking at over 200,000 copies in 2006, with numbers down to 162,181 by December 2012. Auckland is its main delivery area, but it is also delivered to much of the north of the North Island including Northland, Waikato and King Country.

The Herald's main book publications include New Zealand Herald, Weekend Herald and Herald on Sunday. Its supplements include Be Well on Monday, Travel on Tuesday, Viva, Driven and Herald Homes on Wednesday, TimeOut on Thursday, Canvas on Saturday, and Spy on Sunday.

=== Regional newspapers ===
NZME's flagship daily regional papers include The Northern Advocate, Bay of Plenty Times, Rotorua Daily Post, Hawke's Bay Today and the Whanganui Chronicle – New Zealand's oldest newspaper, founded in 1856.

The company also publishes multiple weekly community papers, such as the Bay News, Katikati Advertiser, Te Puke Times, Coastal News, Waihi Leader, Hamilton News, Country News, Taupo & Turangi Weekender, Manawatū Guardian, Whanganui Midweek, and Horowhenua Chronicle.

In March 2024, NZME acquired SunMedia and its assets including the SunLive website, the Weekend Sun, Coast & Country News and New Farm Dairies publications. That same month, the company acquired full ownership of the Gisborne Herald and its website.

=== Joint publications ===
NZME co-owned the Chinese New Zealand Herald between October 2016 and December 2019. In 2019, it was reported that the website and content of the Chinese New Zealand Herald is under the operational and editorial control of the state-run China News Service, controlled by Chinese Communist Party's United Front Work Department and subject to state censorship and government propaganda.

In late June 2023, NZME partnered with Australian media company Are Media to launch an online digital exclusive version of the New Zealand Listener. The website is hosted on The New Zealand Herald's website.

== Radio ==
Radio Network House in Christchurch was imploded on 5 August 2012

NZME Radio began as The Radio Network in 1996 when the commercial radio activities of Radio New Zealand were divested by the fourth National government as part of the Ruthanasia free market economic policies of that government. Radio New Zealand Commercial, which included talk networks Newstalk ZB and Radio Sport and music networks Classic Hits and ZM, became privately owned and was renamed The Radio Network. In 2014, it became part of NZME and was rebranded again as NZME Radio.

The majority of the programming on stations is networked from the main studios on Graham Street in Auckland Central. However, Newstalk ZB run local programmes in Wellington, Nelson, Christchurch and Dunedin. The Hits run local breakfast and morning programmes. Auckland station Mix 98.2 was relaunched in 2014, based on stations previously known as Radio i, Easy Listening i, Viva and Easy Mix, later being rebranded in 2020 as Gold. Privately owned Gore station Hokonui Gold is operated by NZME under a long-term lease contract.

=== History ===
Publicly owned Radio New Zealand Commercial became privately owned The Radio Network in 1996, and later that year it also purchased Prospect Media Limited and its eleven Auckland and Hamilton stations. The brands of Auckland's Radio Hauraki and Easy Listening i were retained and launched as nationwide networks, while Hamilton's Easy Listening i, Auckland's The Breeze on 91, Hamilton's The Breeze on 89.8 and the other stations were converted to the former Radio New Zealand brands.

The company was bought out by a syndicate that included United States radio company Clear Channel Communications and publisher Wilson & Horton. Wilson & Horton was then purchased by Ireland-based media conglomerate Independent News & Media, and on-sold to Independent's Australian subsidiary APN. The Radio Network became an APN and Clear Channel networked commercial radio joint venture, like the Australian Radio Network already was, and as a result The Radio Network became part of the Australian Radio Network.

Radio Network House in Christchurch was damaged in the February 2011 Christchurch earthquake beyond repair. The building became infamous for being the first New Zealand demolition by implosion in August 2012. The implosion was conducted by US specialists and went without problems, providing reassurance for contractors planning to carry out similar operations.

=== Community Radio Network ===
The Radio Network previously ran a group of provincial radio stations known as the Community Radio Network. Established in June 1998, the network retained the local names and live breakfast shows of each station but began broadcasting a network feed from Taupō for other times of the day. The line-up included Mark Bramley (10a – 2p), Aaron Gillions, Scott Armstrong and Brian Gentill (2p – 7p), and Peter Gosney, Corey K and Duncan Allen (7p – 12a). Other voices heard on the network included Geoff Bargas, Rebecca Ali, Nadine Christiansen, Sarah McMullan, Chris Auer, Marke Dickson and Paul Frost.

On 1 December 2000 CRN stations joined the Classic Hits programme fed from Cook Street Auckland, also operated by TRN. Where the station had both an FM and AM frequency the FM frequency was usually used to broadcast a localised version of Classic Hits while the AM frequency was used to broadcast Newstalk ZB. Two stations, Radio Waitomo 1ZW and King Country Radio closed down. Classic Hits was rebranded as The Hits in April 2014. Stations continuing to operate as The Hits include Tokoroa's Radio Forestland, Taupō's Lakeland FM, Gisborne's 2ZG, Masterton's Radio Wairarapa and Wanganui's River City FM. It also included South Island stations Radio Marlborough in Blenheim, Scenicland FM on the West Coast, 3ZE in Ashburton, Radio Caroline in Timaru and Radio Waitaki in Oamaru.

=== Current networks ===
The NZME radio networks are the result of the re-branding of the Community Radio Network and several further years of brand consolidation. In 2004, Cool Blue 96.1FM in Auckland became the first Flava station and Jammin' Oldies in Hawke's Bay became the first Coast station. Original stations of The Breeze in Auckland and Hamilton, 2QQ in Palmerston North and The Planet 97FM in Nelson became ZM. Classic Rock 96FM in Hawke's Bay was replaced with Radio Hauraki. The station once known as Easy Listening i has subsequently been rebranded as Viva FM, Easy Mix, Mix 98.2 and now Gold (on 105.4FM, replaced by iHeart Country).

In 2014, the entire Classic Hits network was rebranded as The Hits. Newstalk ZB and The Hits now reach 25 markets, and ZM and Gold AM reach 19 markets. Radio Hauraki reaches 16, Coast reaches 12, and Flava reaches 8.
