= Georgia Fowler =

New Zealand fashion model (born 1992)

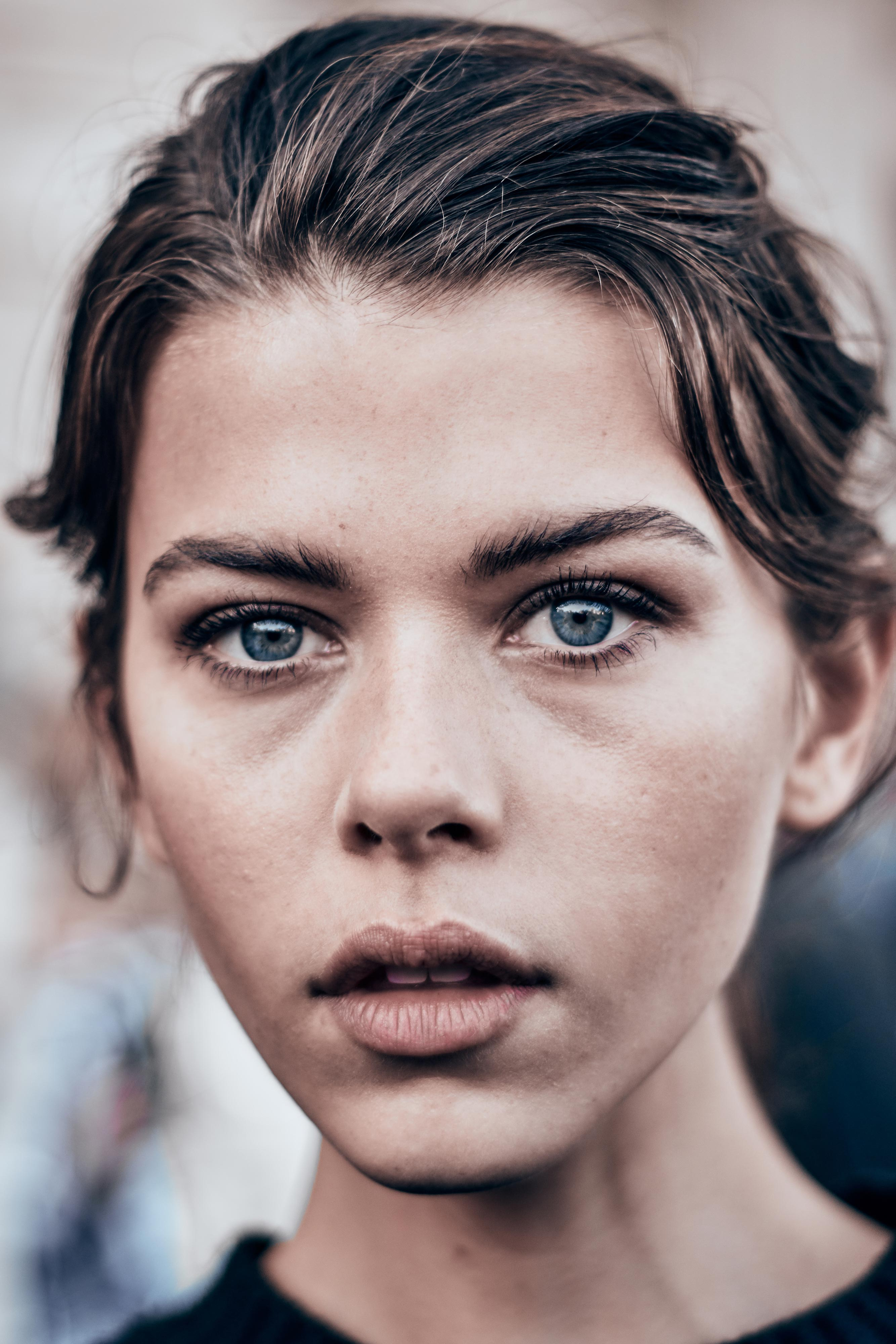
- Georgia Fowler, Paris Fashion Week Spring Summer 2019
- Born: 17 June 1992 (age 34); Auckland, New Zealand
- Occupation: Model
- Known for: Victoria's Secret
- Spouse: Nathan Dalah (m. 2023)
- Children: 2
- Modelling information
- Height: 1.77 m (5 ft 9 1/2 in)
- Hair colour: Brown
- Eye colour: Blue
- Agency: IMG Models (worldwide)

Georgia Fowler (born 17 June 1992) is a New Zealand model, known for walking in the Victoria's Secret Fashion Show in 2016, 2017 and 2018. In 2018, she was the presenter of season 1 of Project Runway New Zealand.

== Early life ==
Fowler was born in Auckland, New Zealand to Australian golfer Peter Fowler and Kim Fowler. Fowler and her sister, Kate, attended private school, Diocesan School for Girls.

== Modelling career ==
Fowler was discovered at the age of 12, and was represented by a modelling agency in Auckland. Four years later, she signed with IMG Models and moved to New York City .

Fowler is known for walking the Victoria's Secret Fashion Show from 2016 to 2018. She shoots regularly with Victoria's Secret and was quoted saying that Victoria's Secret was her goal that she had been working towards for five years. She has also modelled for Miu Miu, DKNY, Prada and other fashion lines. Fowler has walked the runway for Chanel and Kanye West's Yeezy label, and been featured in publications such as Vogue Girl Korea, has worked with brands like Banana Republic and H&M, and three times she has been a cover model for Harper's Bazaar Australia.

Fowler starred in a music video for the song It Ain't Me by Kygo & Selena Gomez.

Fowler was prominently featured at the Mercedes-Benz Fashion Week in Australia in 2018, and she hosted the Australian Fashion Laureate Award alongside Ash Williams.

Since 2018, she has been listed on models.com as a "Money Girl".

In 2017, and 2018, Fowler appeared in magazines such as Marie Claire Australia, Vogue, The File, W, and Harper's Bazaar, to share her beauty and fitness regimen.

In late 2018, Fowler was the presenter of New Zealand's version of the Project Runway television show.

== Personal life ==
Fowler is married to Australian restauranteer Nathan Dalah. In April 2021, Fowler and Dalah announced that they were expecting their first child. Their daughter was born on 17 September 2021. She married Nathan Dalah in January 2023.

On September 4, 2023, in an Instagram post, she revealed that she is expecting her second child. Their son was born on February 15, 2024.
