= Cook Strait News =

New Zealand newspaper

Cook Strait News was a free community newspaper in Wellington, New Zealand, which covered the Eastern and Southern suburbs of the city. It was published between 5 April 1994 and 13 June 2006. At some point after 2006, it resumed publication, with the last edition dated 28 March 2019.

According to a 2012 ABC audit, Cook Strait News printed 25,456 copies weekly. The deadline for the newspaper was on Friday afternoons with it being delivered throughout the area on Mondays.

From 2013 it was part of Wellington Suburban Newspapers which is owned by Blenheim-based publisher Les Whiteside and his wife Katrina. Wellington Suburban Newspapers also publish the Independent Herald and the Wainuiomata News.
