= Call signs in New Zealand =

Call signs in New Zealand are no longer generally used to identify broadcast stations. However, New Zealand's radio stations were once known by their call signs and would usually broadcast their call signs as a number followed by X, Y, or Z, and another letter (e.g. 1YA). Call signs are regulated internationally by the ITU and nationally by the Ministry of Business, Innovation and Employment (MBIE), formerly the Ministry of Economic Development. The ministry is also responsible for providing policy advice to Government on the allocation of New Zealand's radio spectrum to support, efficient, reliable and responsive wireless telecommunications and broadcasting infrastructure.

In 1924, New Zealand was granted the prefix 'Z', and in 1925 the number of licensed amateur(?) reached 100. In 1927, the International Telecommunication Union Conference in Washington (D.C., USA) established internally agreed upon call sign prefixes – New Zealand was assigned 'OZ'. In 1929 this was expanded to the ZK–ZM letter block, with New Zealand opting for the ZL prefix for land-based stations. 'OZ' by 1927 was reassigned to Denmark. In 1969 the ZM prefix was allowed to celebrate the Captain James Cook bicentenary. In 1974, the prefix was allowed again to celebrate the Commonwealth Games, as well as in 1989 when the Games returned. In 1981, the ZL0 prefix was allowed for visitors to New Zealand.

== Allocations and assignments ==
The International Telecommunication Union has assigned New Zealand the following call sign blocks for all radio communication, broadcasting or transmission:

Call sign block	Allocation
E5A–E5Z	New Zealand – Cook Islands
ZKA–ZMZ	New Zealand

While not directly related to call signs, the International Telecommunication Union (ITU) further has divided all countries assigned amateur radio prefixes into three regions; New Zealand is located in ITU Region 3, within ITU Zone 60.

There are 4 possible 2-letter prefixes and 40 2-letter/1-number prefixes available to New Zealand operators based on the ITU blocks (ZK, ZL, ZM and E5). This provides for about 720,000 three-character-suffix call signs and significantly more if numerals comprise either or both of the first two characters of the suffix. A further 18.8 million 4-character call signs are potentially available, as well as considerably more when digits are assigned in the suffix.

Of these prefixes, 1 is currently assigned (ZL) for normal amateur radio operation. ZM can be used in place of ZL for short special events (e.g. contests), and E5 calls are issued in the Cook Islands (both North and South Cooks).

Although ZL1 to ZL4 were previously issued strictly according to the operator's location within New Zealand, that is no longer the case.

New Zealand is assigned DXCC entity #170. Primary callsign suffixes can be from one letter to four letters in the A–Y, AA–YZ, AAA–YZZ and AAAA–YZZZ blocks. Temporary special event callsigns may have five or six letter suffixes.

Prefixes	Subseries	Purpose	# issued	DXCC Entity #
ZK	1–9	Niue and Tokelau	74	#188
E5A–E5Z		North Cook Island, used to be ZK1/N	193	#191
E5A–E5Z		South Cook Island, used to be ZK1/S	(incl in N. Cook)	#234
ZL1	A–Y to AAAA–YZZZ	New Zealand	2,306	#170
ZL2	A–Y to AAAA–YZZZ	New Zealand	1,985	#170
ZL3	A–Y to AAAA–YZZZ	New Zealand	1,011	#170
ZL4	A–Y to AAAA–YZZZ	New Zealand	664	#170
ZL5	A–Y to AAAA–YZZZ	Antarctica	1	
ZL6	A–Y to AAAA–YZZZ	NZART	15	#170
ZL7	A–Y to AAAA–YZZZ	Chatham Islands	6	#034
ZL8	A–Y to AAAA–YZZZ	Kermadec Islands	2	#133
ZL9	A–Y to AAAA–YZZZ	Sub-Antarctic Territories	2	#016
ZL	10–100	Temporary Commemorative Callsigns		#170

=== Use of 'ZM' ===
The ZM prefix can be substituted for ZL for contests and commemorative events, at the discretion of the licensee.

=== Single-letter call signs ===
ZL licence holders may apply for up to one secondary single-letter call sign, such as ZL1W. A "stand-down" period of six months applies in regard to the reallocation of temporary call signs to the same licence holder or club. However, the call sign may be reallocated for further 12-month periods without stand-down, provided the licence authority receives at the time of the application (which must be made prior to the expiry of the then current 12-month period) evidence to the licensing authority's satisfaction that a temporary call sign is being used on a regular basis.

=== Two-numeral call signs ===
The E5 prefix for the Cook Islands produces two-numeral callsigns when the separating numeral is attached. The 'E51' prefix is most often used.

=== Five- and six-letter call signs ===
Temporary callsigns may be issued with up to 6-letter suffixes, such as ZL1ABCDEF. Such callsigns may be allocated for up to 12 months, typically for special events and notable anniversaries.

=== Allocation of temporary call signs in the ZL10 to ZL100 Series ===
A licence holder with a primary or secondary callsign in the ZL1 to ZL9 series may be allocated, as a temporary callsign for a period not exceeding 3 months, a ZL10 to ZL100 prefix to commemorate their anniversary as an active amateur (or the establishment of the club). For example, the holder of ZL1WZZ celebrating 40 years in amateur radio may be allocated, for a 3-month period, the callsign ZL40WZZ.

== Nomenclature ==
Radio dials like this one from a vintage Philco (circa 1953) included New Zealand call signs.

All radio stations call signs started with ZL, although this was excluded when broadcast.

The number referred to the geographical area:

1	North Island north of Taupō
2	North Island south of Taupō, Nelson and Marlborough
3	South Island north of the Waitaki River, excluding Nelson and Marlborough
4	South Island south of Waitaki River

The first letter referred to the type of station:

X	Private commercial stations
Y	Radio New Zealand non-commercial stations
Z	Radio New Zealand commercial stations (now part of New Zealand Media and Entertainment)

For private stations, beginning with X, the final letter in the call sign was usually the first letter of the name of the station or the name of the town the station was based in or simply a letter chosen by the station.

For non-commercial stations beginning with the letter Y, the four main centres (Auckland, Wellington, Christchurch and Dunedin) had YA stations, the second largest centre at the time was typically assigned a YZ station such as 3YZ in Greymouth and 4YZ in Southland, this was for National Radio. For other regions the final letter was typically the first letter the location. The Concert Programme in the four main centres was assigned YC and at this stage only broadcast in the main centres though the Concert Programme was relayed onto other stations during evenings.

The last letter was either the first letter of the location, (e.g. 1ZH in Hamilton and 4ZG in Gore) or was assigned in order with ZB going to the four main centres (Auckland, Wellington, Christchurch and Dunedin) and ZA going to the second largest region at the time such as 1ZA Taupo, 2ZA Palmerston North, 3ZA Greymouth and 4ZA Invercargill.

This system of allocating call signs was for AM radio stations only; the very few FM radio stations that were operating had 3 letters in the call sign, the first number remained the same. Radio stations that were originally on AM but began broadcasting on FM often kept the AM call sign name or an additional letter was added to the existing call sign name. Some examples are 2ZM in Wellington became 2ZZM (but at this point branded as ZMFM) and 1XX in Whakatane became 1XXX but remained branded as One Double X. Call signs for these stations were often abbreviations of the stations' brand names. The FM call signs assigned to Concert FM usually followed the format of the area number, the first letter of the city or region and then the letters CP (Concert Programme), for example 1ACP in Auckland and 4DCP in Dunedin. National Radio was not broadcasting on FM when stations were allocated call signs so no call signs were ever allocated to National Radio's FM frequencies.

== List of call signs ==
The following is a list of some of the call signs assigned to radio stations prior to 1990 when New Zealand stopped assigning call signs to radio stations.

=== Region 1 ===
==== AM stations ====
Radio stations that originally broadcast on an AM frequency.

Call sign	Station Location	Original AM frequency	Call sign Meaning	Notes
1XA	Auckland	1476 kHz		Radio Hauraki—holder of the first comm. licence
1XB	Auckland	950 kHz		Radio Bosom - later became Radio B then subsequently bFM. March 1975.
1XC	Coromandel	1030 kHz	C = Coromandel	Radio SAM - Short term station run in 1978. Frequency changed soon after to 1170 kHz. In 1980, 1XC was assigned to Radio Contact in Hamilton - a station at the Waikato University. Now Radio Rhema Tauranga 540 kHz.
1XD	Auckland	1476 kHz		Radio Trackside
1XG	Auckland	1251 kHz		Radio Rhema
1XH	Hamilton	1310 kHz	H = Hamilton	Commenced 1949 - became 1ZH in 1968. In 1988, 1XH was reassigned to Radio Rhema in Hamilton on 855 kHz.
1XI	Auckland	1332 kHz	I = Radio i	Originally Radio i and later Easy Listening i, known as Easy Mix before the network closed down in 2012
1XK	Tauranga	1440 kHz		Now Moana Radio
1XM	Auckland	702 kHz	M = Manurewa (the original location of the transmitter)	
1XN	Whangarei	970 kHz	N = Northland	Started in 1949. In 1981, 1XN was issued to a short term station called Radio Nambassaland which ran for 5 days during the Nambassa Festival at Waitawheta, near Waihi. Now Radio Pacific Rotorua 1548 kHz.
1XP	Auckland	1593 kHz	P = Radio Pacific	The original Radio Pacific station, now LiveSport.
1XT	Tauranga	1368 kHz	T = Tauranga	Village Radio 1XT
1XW	Hamilton	954 kHz	W = Waikato	Originally issued to Radio Waikato as the third private licence in mid-1970. Radio Waikato became Radio Pacific 954 kHz, then LiveSport, later TAB Trackside. SENZ now uses 954 kHz. How the call sign ever switched to Rhema's "The Word" on 576 kHz before calls were abolished is mysterious.
1XX	Whakatane	1242 kHz		What began as 1XX/R. Whakatāne now uses the slogan/brand One-Double-X.
1YA	Auckland	756 kHz		Radio NZ National network, located at 74 Shortland Street New Zealand's first purpose-built public radio facility that was later the site for New Zealand's first official television broadcast in 1960 and is now home to The University of Auckland's Gus Fisher Gallery. As a protected heritage feature, the transmitter mast remains on the roof
1YB	Auckland			Commenced in 1923. Became 1ZB in 1933.
1YC	Auckland	882 kHz	C = Concert	Formerly used for Radio NZ Concert programme
1YD	Auckland	1250 kHz		Commenced January 1926. Became 1YQ in June 1926.
1YE	Kaikohe	981 kHz		Radio NZ National network
1YK	Kaitaia	837 kHz	K = Kaitaia	Radio NZ National network
1YQ	Auckland			Commenced June 1926. Became 1ZQ August 1926.
1YT	Taupō	1314 kHz	T = Taupo	Radio NZ National network, was 1ZT's frequency, then used as 1YT, this frequency is no longer used, now on 101.5 MHz
1YW	Hamilton	1143 kHz	W = Waikato	Radio NZ National network
1YX	Whangarei	837 kHz		Radio NZ National network. Originally 1YX in Auckland - July 1933 - then became 1YC September 1948.
1YZ	Rotorua	1188 kHz		Radio NZ National network
1ZA	Taupō	1494 kHz		Originally on 1500 when founded in 1964, Radio Lakeland rebranded as Classic Hits 96.7 in 2001 and The Hits Taupo in 2014.
1ZB	Auckland	1080 kHz		Originally 1ZB and then Newstalk 1ZB now Newstalk ZB (the first Newstalk ZB station)
1ZC	Rotorua	1350 kHz		Originally on 1520 kHz, Radio Geyserland moved to 1350 kHz in early '65, rebranded as Rotorua's Classic Hits 97.5 in 1993 and The Hits Rotorua in 2014
1ZD	Tauranga	1008 kHz		Opened simply as 1ZD/1000, Radio B.O.P. rebranded as Classic Hits 95 BOP FM in 1993 and The Hits Bay of Plenty in 2014. Now Newstalk ZB.
1ZE	Kaikohe	1215 kHz		Relay of Radio Northland programme which is now The Hits Northland
1ZH	Hamilton	1296 kHz	H = Hamilton	Originally 1XH/1310 and later ZHFM rebranded as Waikato's Classic Hits 98.6 ZHFM in 1993 and The Hits Waikato in 2014
1ZJ	Auckland			Commenced November 1930 - close December 1938.
1ZK	Kaitaia	1026 kHz	K = Kaitaia	Relay of Radio Northland programme which is now The Hits Northland
1ZM	Auckland (originally Manurewa)	1251 kHz	M = Manurewa	Originally 1ZM or 1251ZM. Classic Hits 1251 from 1987 to 1989. Frequency taken over by Radio Rhema in 1989 with Classic Hits 1251 moving to 97.4 MHz and rebranded as Classic Hits 97FM.
1ZN	Whangarei	1026 kHz		Originally Radio Northland, Classic Hits Northland from 1993 and The Hits Northland from 2014
1ZO	Tokoroa	1413 kHz		Originally Radio Forestland, Classic Hits Forestland 96.4 from 2001 and The Hits South Waikato from 2014.
1ZQ	Auckland			Commenced August 1926 - closed March 1933.
1ZR	Auckland			Commenced December 1930 - closed December 1933.
1ZS	Auckland			Commenced January 1931 - closed June 1934
1ZT	Turangi	1386 kHz	T = Turangi	Relay of Radio Lakeland, rebranded as Classic Hits 96.7 in 2001 and The Hits Taupo in 2014.
1ZU	Taumarunui	1512 kHz		King Country Radio from 1966, rebranded as Classic Hits King Country Radio in 2001. Closed down in 2010.
1ZW	Te Kuiti	1170 kHz	W = Waitomo	Originally Radio Waitomo - became Classic Hits Radio Waitomo, subsequently renamed back to Radio Waitomo - station closed permanently in 2005.

==== FM stations ====
Stations that originally broadcast on an FM frequency or existing stations that were assigned a new call sign after beginning broadcasting on FM.

Call sign	Station Location	Call sign Meaning	Notes
1KCC	Northland		Originally KCC FM, now More FM Northland.
1MJK	Auckland	MJK = Magic	Used for Magic 91FM in Auckland. Station no longer operating and frequency used for 91ZM
1ROQ	Auckland		Used for 89 Stereo FM. Station no longer operating and frequency used for Newstalk ZB
1STU	Auckland	STUdent radio	Used for 95bFM Auckland
1ACP	Auckland	A = Auckland CP = Concert Programme	Used for Radio New Zealand Concert
1KIW	Waikato	KIW = Kiwi	Used for 89.8 Kiwi FM. Station no longer in operation and frequency used for 89-8ZM
1WCP	Waikato	W = Waikato CP = Concert Programme	Used for Radio New Zealand Concert
1GEY	Rotorua	GEY = Geyserland	Used for Radio Geyserland, became Rotorua's Classic Hits 97.5 in 1993 and The Hits Rotorua in 2014
1KIS	Taupō		Used for KIS FM Taupo, now More FM Taupo
1TRR	Taupō	T = Taupo RR = Radio Rhema	Radio Rhema Taupo

=== Region 2 ===
==== AM stations ====
Radio stations that originally broadcast on an AM frequency.

Call sign	Station Location	Original AM Frequency	Call sign Meaning	Notes
2XA	Levin	1602 kHz		Originally assigned to 1200 in Whānganui, which became 2ZW. Call sign then allocated for Radio for the Print Disabled, based in Levin - shut down February 2019.
2XG	Wellington	1503 kHz, now on 972 kHz.		Call sign allocated for Radio Rhema.
2XM	Wellington	1161 kHz	M = Maori	Originally for private station 1180/Gisborne till the owner's death in early 60's, when 1180 kHz became 2YW. Call sign allocated to Te Upoko O Te Ika on the former 2ZM frequency.
2XO	Wellington	1233 kHz		Call sign allocated when BBC World Service was on air in Wellington in the 1990s, frequency was used by Radio Live and now Sport Nation.
2XP	Wellington	711 kHz	P = Pacific	Call sign allocated to Radio Pacific's Wellington frequency, now B Sport - decommissioned 2024.
2XQ	Wellington	1323 kHz		Call sign that was allocated for Radio Aotearoa when on the air from 1988 until shut down in 1994.
2XS	Palmerston North	828 kHz		Originally used for 2XS, Call Sign for 2XS became 2XXS after switching to FM. 2XS used for Magic 828 & 98.6FM which is now The Breeze Manawatu
2XX	Kapiti	1377 kHz		Originally 2XX then More FM Kapiti then Radio Sport - decommissioned February 2020.
2XW	Wellington	1080 kHz then 891 kHz	W = Wellington or Radio Windy	Originally Radio Windy then The Breeze Wellington then Magic - decommissioned 2024.
2YA	Wellington	567 kHz		Radio NZ National network.
2YB	Wellington	783 kHz		Call sign used for Access Radio Wellington until 2017 - now decommissioned.
2YC	Wellington	657 kHz	C = Concert	Formerly used for Radio NZ Concert programme.
2YM	Palmerston North	1449 kHz		Radio NZ National network - decommissioned May 2025.
2YX	Nelson	1116 kHz		Radio NZ National network - decommissioned March 2025.
2ZA	Palmerston North	927 kHz		Originally 2ZA, rebranded Manawatu's Classic Hits 97.8 ZAFM in 1993, rebranded as The Hits Manawatu in 2014 - decommissioned May 2025.
2ZB	Wellington	1035 kHz		Originally 2ZB, now part of Newstalk ZB
2ZC	Napier	1278 kHz		Originally Bay City Radio, rebranded as Hawke's Bay's Classic Hits 89.5 in 1994, rebranded as The Hits Hawke's Bay in 2014 - now Newstalk ZB
2ZD	Masterton	846 kHz		Originally Radio Wairarapa became Classic Hits Wairarapa 90.1 in 2001 and The Hits Wairarapa in 2014 - decommissioned late January 2025.
2ZE	Blenheim	1539 kHz		Call sign was originally used for the Blenheim frequency of Radio Marlborough, which became Classic Hits Marlborough 96.9 in 2001 and The Hits Marlborough in 2014. Eventually became Radio Sport. Decommissioned March 2020. Today a station in Eketahuna called 2ZE operates. The E = Eketahuna, this station is a private station was never part of Radio New Zealand's Commercial group of stations.
2ZF	Picton	1584 kHz		Call sign for Picton frequency of Radio Marlborough, known as Classic Hits Marlborough 96.9 since 2001 and The Hits Marlborough since 2014. Decommissioned August 2020.
2ZG	Gisborne	945 kHz	G = Gisborne	Originally 2XG/1160, 2ZG The Coaster, became Gisborne's Classic Hits 90.9 ZGFM in 1993, rebranded as The Hits Gisborne in 2014. Currently Newstalk ZB
2ZH	Hāwera	1557 kHz	H = Hawera	Originally as a relay station for Radio Taranaki, Radio Taranaki began broadcasting on 90.0 MHz in 1991 and became Taranaki's Classic Hits 90FM in 1993 and The Hits Taranaki from 2014. The 1557 kHz frequency was used for Newstalk ZB from 1993 to 2005, then used for Coast and now carries Gold Sport.
2ZK	Hawkes Bay	765 kHz		Started as 77ZK or Radio Apple, frequency later used for local station 96FM, then ZM and now Radio Kahungunu.
2ZM	Wellington	1161 kHz	M = Music	Now part of ZM
2ZN	Nelson	1341 kHz	N = Nelson	Originally 2XN/1360. Used for Radio Nelson which became Nelson's Classic Hits 90FM in 1993 and The Hits Nelson in 2014. Eventually became Gold Sport. Decommissioned March 2025.
2ZP	New Plymouth	1053 kHz	P = New Plymouth	Opened as 2XP/1370 in the late 40's .Became 1ZP Radio Taranaki. Radio Taranaki began broadcasting on 90.0 MHz in 1991 and became Taranaki's Classic Hits 90FM in 1993 and The Hits Taranaki from 2014. Frequency was used for Newstalk ZB since 1993 until the transmitter was decommissioned in November 2020.
2ZW	Wanganui	1197 kHz	W = Wanganui	Opened as 2XA/1200 in the late 40's Originally used for 2ZW which later became River City Radio. Station became Classic Hits River City FM in 2001 and The Hits Whānganui from 2014. Now Newstalk ZB

==== FM stations ====
Stations that originally broadcast on an FM frequency or existing stations that were assigned a new call sign after beginning broadcasting on FM.

Call sign	Station Location	Call sign Meaning	Notes
2NRG	New Plymouth	NRG = Energy	Assigned to Energy FM when station began broadcasting. Station branded as More FM Taranaki.
2ZZP	New Plymouth	P = New Plymouth	Assigned to Radio Taranaki when station began broadcasting on FM, 2ZP used for AM frequency. Station branded as Taranaki's Classic Hits 90FM from 1993 and The Hits Taranaki since 2014.
2HCP	Hawkes Bay	H = Hawkes Bay CP = Concert Programme	Radio New Zealand Concert
2BAY	Hawkes Bay	BAY = Radio Hawkes Bay	Originally used for Radio Hawkes Bay which became HOT 93FM and later More FM Hawke's Bay
2ZZK	Hawkes Bay		Originally used for 77ZK Radio Apple as 2ZK, FM call sign was 2ZZK and station was later branded as Greatest Hits FM96 and later Classic Rock 96FM. Station was replaced with Radio Hauraki and later ZM.
2SON	Hawkes Bay	SON = Son FM	Used for Son FM
2MCP	Manawatu	M = Manawatu CP = Concert Programme	Radio New Zealand Concert
2MMM	Manawatu		Radio Control
2MZM	Manawatu	M = Manawatu ZM	Original call sign for ZMFM when relay from Wellington was established. Later replaced with 2QQ FM in 1989 and then reverted to 91ZM in 1997.
2XXS	Manawatu		Used for 2XS FM in Palmerston North after switching to FM now More FM Manawatu
2ZZM	Wellington	M = Music	Call sign used for ZMFM Wellington after switching to FM
2WCP	Wellington	W = Wellington CP = Concert Programme	Radio New Zealand Concert
2VUW	Wellington	VU = Victoria University W = Wellington	Radio Active
2FFF	Nelson		Used for Fifeshire FM, now More FM Nelson
2NCP	Nelson	N = Nelson CP = Concert Programme	Radio New Zealand Concert
2STA	Blenheim		Used for X-Static FM, 89FM Easy FM, now The Breeze Marlborough

=== Region 3 ===
==== AM stations ====
Radio stations that originally broadcast on an AM frequency.

Call sign	Location	Original AM Frequency	Call sign Meaning	Notes
3XA	Christchurch	1260 kHz	A = Avon	Radio Avon, this station merged with C93FM which was closed down in 2001. FM frequency was replaced with network station Solid Gold. Solid Gold was rebranded as The Sound in 2012.
3XG	Christchurch	1575 kHz		Radio Rhema Christchurch
3XP	Christchurch	1413 kHz		Still operating today as Radio Ferrymead
3YA	Christchurch	675 kHz		Radio NZ National network
3YC	Christchurch	963 kHz	C = Concert	Formerly used for Radio NZ Concert programme
3YW	Westport	1458 kHz	W = Westport	Radio NZ National network, still broadcasting on 1458AM
3YZ	Greymouth	918 kHz		Radio NZ National network, FM only now
3ZA	Greymouth	747 kHz		Used to broadcast Radio Scenicland which became Scenicland FM in November 1992, then West Coast's Classic Hits Scenicland FM in 2001 and The Hits West Coast in 2014.
3ZB	Christchurch	1098 kHz		Now part of Newstalk ZB
3ZC	Timaru	1152 kHz		Originally Radio Caroline, became Classic Hits 99FM in 1995, South Canterbury's 99FM in 1997 (after leaving the Classic Hits network) and Classic Hits 99FM in 2001 (after rejoining the Classic Hits network) and The Hits South Canterbury from 2014.
3ZE	Ashburton	873 kHz		Originally 3ZE, became Ashburton's Classic Hits 92.5 ZEFM in 2001 and The Hits Ashburton since 2014.
3ZM	Christchurch	1323 kHz	M = Music	Now part of ZM
3ZO	Twizel	1485 kHz		Twizel call sign for relay of Radio Caroline programme, discontinued in the 1990s.
3ZR	Reefton	1521 kHz	R = Reefton	Used to broadcast Radio Scenicland which became Scenicland FM in November 1992, then West Coast's Classic Hits Scenicland FM in 2001 and The Hits West Coast in 2014

==== FM stations ====
Stations that originally broadcast on an FM frequency or existing stations that were assigned a new call sign after beginning broadcasting on FM.

Call sign	Station Location	Call sign Meaning	Notes
3CCP	Christchurch	C = Christchurch CP = Concert Programme	Radio New Zealand Concert
3CCT	Christchurch		Plains FM
3FMX	Christchurch		Used for C93FM Christchurch, station no longer in operation and frequency used for Solid Gold
3RDU	Christchurch		Used for RDU-FM
3ZZM	Christchurch	M = Music	Call sign used for ZMFM Christchurch after switching to FM

=== Region 4 ===
==== AM stations ====
Radio stations that originally broadcast on an AM frequency.

Call sign	Location	Original AM frequency	Call sign Meaning	Notes
4XA	Central Otago	531 kHz	A = Alexandra	Originally Radio Central now More FM Central Otago
4XC	Queenstown	1359 kHz		Originally Resort Radio now More FM Queenstown
4XD	Dunedin	1431 and 1305 kHz	D = Dunedin	The very first radio station in New Zealand Radio Dunedin
4XE	Wanaka			Radio Wanaka
4XF	Southland	1224 kHz	F = Foveaux Radio	Originally Foveaux Radio and later Foveaux FM now More FM Southland. The 1224 kHz frequency has been used to broadcast LiveSport since 2007.
4XI	Southland	1548 kHz	I = Invercargill	Original frequency for Radio Rhema Southland used for tests in 1987
4XL	Southland	1404 kHz		Radio Rhema Southland
4XO	Dunedin	1206 kHz		Originally known as 4XO now More FM Dunedin
4YA	Dunedin	810 kHz		Radio NZ National network
4YC	Dunedin	900 kHz	C = Concert	Formerly used for Radio NZ Concert programme
4YQ	Queenstown	1134 kHz	Q = Queenstown	Radio NZ National network and was once used as a relay of the 4ZB programme.
4YW	Alexandra	639 kHz		Radio NZ National network and was once used as a relay of the 4ZB programme.
4YZ	Southland	720 kHz		Radio NZ National network
4ZA	Invercargill	864 kHz		Used to broadcast 4ZA, began broadcasting on 98.8 MHz in 1991. 4ZA became known as Classic Hits ZAM since 1993 and The Hits Southland since 2014. The 864 kHz frequency has been used to broadcast Newstalk ZB since 1994.
4ZB	Dunedin	1044 kHz		Originally 4ZB. Became ZBFM when the station began broadcasting on 89.4 MHz, rebranded as Classic Hits 89FM in 1993 and The Hits Dunedin in 2014. The 1044 kHz frequency has been used to broadcast Newstalk ZB since 1994.
4ZG	Gore	558 kHz	G = Gore	Originally Hokonui Radio or 4ZG now known as Hokonui Gold
4ZW	Oamaru	1395 kHz	W = Waitaki	Originally Radio Waitaki. Began broadcasting on 89.4 MHz in 2001 coinciding with the rebrand as Classic Hits Radio Waitaki. Became The Hits Oamaru in 2014. The 1395 kHz frequency has been used to broadcast Newstalk ZB since 2001.

==== FM stations ====
Stations that originally broadcast on an FM frequency or existing stations that were assigned a new call sign after beginning broadcasting on FM.

Call sign	Station Location	Call sign Meaning	Notes
4SKI	Queenstown		Used by Q92 FM Queenstown, now The Breeze Queenstown
4DCP	Dunedin	D = Dunedin CP = Concert Programme	Radio New Zealand Concert
4SAO	Dunedin		Radio One
4ZZB	Dunedin		Call sign used for 4ZB FM frequency, station branded as ZBFM after switching to FM, followed by Classic Hits 89FM in 1993 and The Hits Dunedin in 2014.
4SCP	Southland	S = Southland CP = Concert Programme	Radio New Zealand Concert
4KYG	Invercargill	KYG = Knox Youth Group	Crossfire FM - a short term broadcast during 1990 by a city youth group.

=== Maritime Radio ===
Coastal radio stations operated by the New Zealand Post Office to serve shipping traffic were allocated callsigns consisting of the ZL prefix and a single letter. The only remaining coastal station as of 2018 is Taupo Maritime Radio ZLM, operated by Kordia on behalf of Maritime New Zealand.

Call Sign	Station	Period of Operation	Notes
ZLA	Awanui Radio	18 December 1913 – 10 February 1930	NZA until 5 July 1912, then VLA until 31 December 1928
ZLB	Awarua Radio	18 December 1913 – 30 August 1991	VLB until 31 December 1928
ZLC	Chatham Islands Radio	18 September 1913 – 30 August 1991	VLC until 31 December 1928
ZLD	Auckland Radio	24 October 1912 – 30 September 1993	NZK until 5 July 1912, then VLD until 31 December 1928
ZLM	Taupo Maritime Radio	Unknown, but still in operation	Operated remotely from Maritime Operations Centre, Avalon, Lower Hutt
ZLQ	Scott Base	January 1957 – March 1992	NZPO (Later Telecom New Zealand) provided HF voice & telex links to New Zealand until commissioning of Satellite Earth Station in 1992 - ZLQ still used for local, deep field & back up intercontinental HF SSB communications
ZLW	Wellington Radio	26 July 1911 – 30 September 1993	NZW until 5 July 1912, then VLW until 31 December 1928
ZLX, ZLZ	Himatangi Radio	9 November 1953 – 30 September 1993	

== See also ==
- List of radio stations in New Zealand
- Amateur radio international operation
- ITU prefix – amateur and experimental stations
- Amateur radio
