= Floods in Greymouth =

Natural disasters in New Zealand

The town of Greymouth, at the mouth of the Grey River on New Zealand's West Coast, has been regularly flooded since its founding. Many floods were assigned names, such as: The Great Flood (1872); The Jubilee Flood (1887); The Big Flood (1905); The Biggest Since 1887 (1936); The Biggest Since 1936 (1977); The Big One (May 1988); and The Biggest (September 1988). A flood protection wall was completed in 1990, and the town has not since experienced flooding from the river.

== Historic floods ==
=== The Great Flood (1872) ===
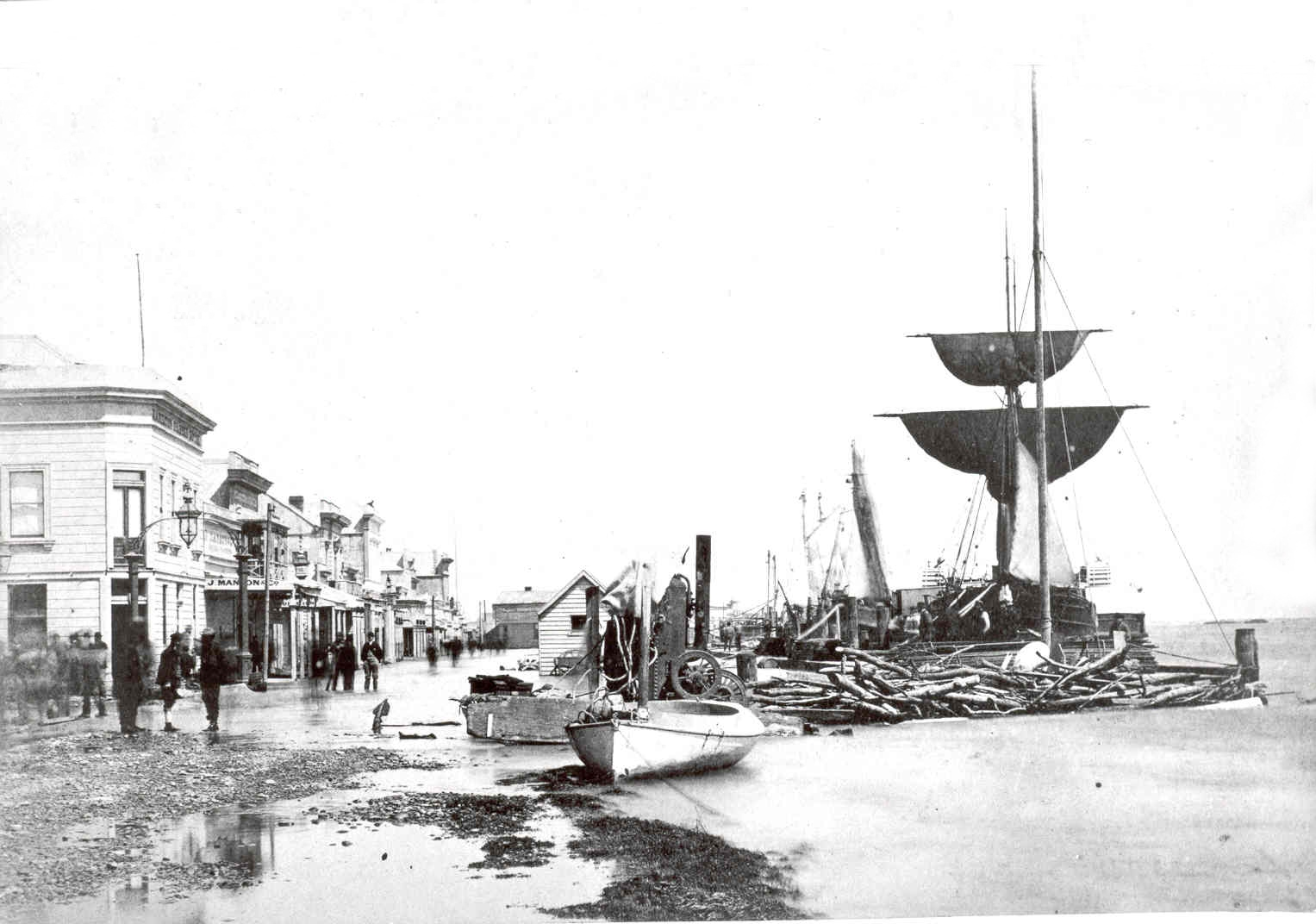
1872 Greymouth Flood

This flood occurred on 9 February 1872 after a week of heavy rain combined with heavy seas along the coast. The high sea exacerbated the situation as the flood waters were prevented from draining away and consequently backed up. Richmond Quay was the most affected area; whole blocks of offices, shops and other structures were washed out to sea. Dozens of houses were lifted off their piles and floated down the river, their kerosene lamps still burning. As soon as they crossed the Bar however, the lights were extinguished and the houses broken into matchwood by the sea. One life was lost, the youngest son of William Dale was drowned. The flood did a great deal of damage and extended over a wide area. Luckily the Prime Minister, Sir William Fox, was visiting Westport on the night of the flood. He travelled to Greymouth the next day and made an inspection, ordering the building of a protective wall which was completed in 1885 at a cost of five thousand pounds.

=== The Jubilee Flood (1887) ===
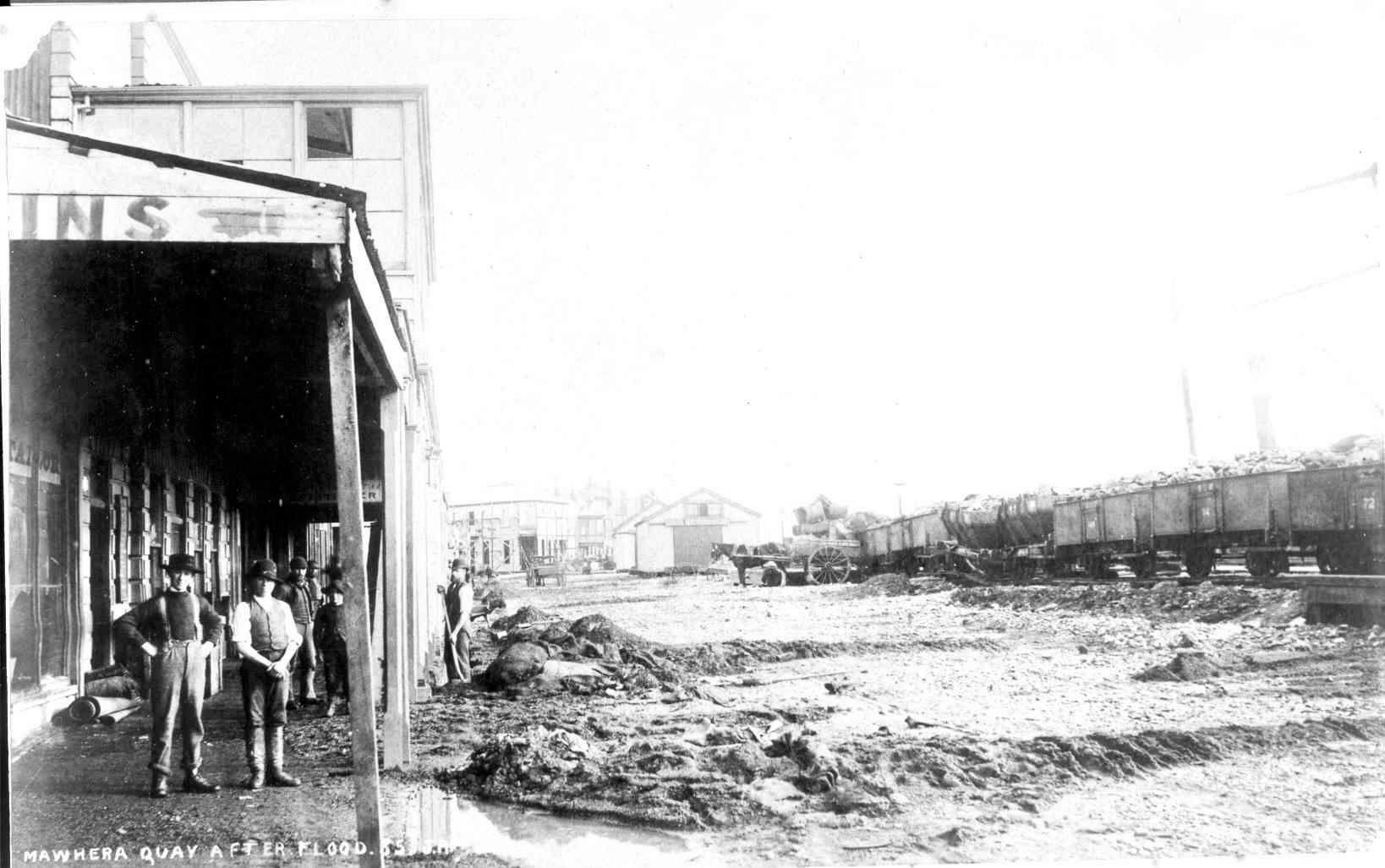
1887 Greymouth Flood

Wednesday 6 July 1887 witnessed the worst flooding in Greymouth since the great flood of 1872 with water reaching two feet higher. Water invaded many homes with hundreds made homeless, needing to seek refuge in churches and in the State School. Flood waters overflowed the wharf and 9.00am, peaked at noon, and receded by dusk. Every business and house along Māwhera Quay was flooded to a depth of at least 1 metre and boats were needed to rescue people between 3.00am and 10.00am. At its peak the river nearly touched the base of the Cobden Bridge; the water level in the mid-channel area was reported to be about 1 metre higher than at the banks.

=== The Big Flood (1905) ===
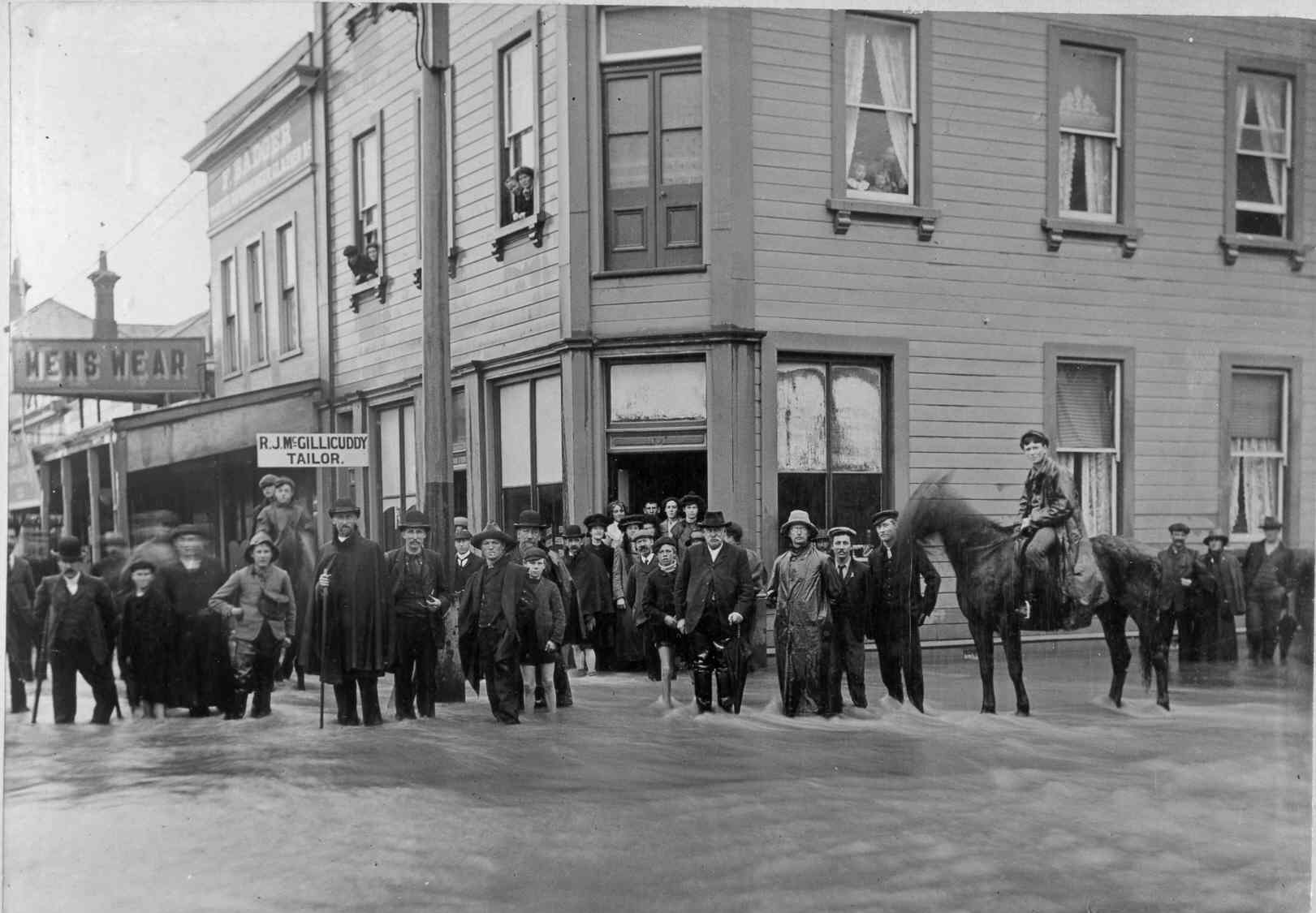
1905 Greymouth Flood

At 4am on Saturday 24 June 1905 the firebell sounded the alarm bringing businessmen rushing to their premises to lift goods from floor level. Many people had kept watch on the Friday night but although there was a howling gale and heavy rain, the river did not give the indications of the forthcoming heavy flood. It rose rapidly however in the following two hours and was lapping the wharf at 5am. All the main streets of the town were flooded with the current in Māwhera Quay a raging torrent.

In the twenty-four hours between 9am on Friday to 9am on Saturday 4 3/4 inches (120 mm) of rain fell at Greymouth, even more in the country areas. At Bealey 11 inches (280 mm) were recorded. In spite of the falling tide, the river continued to rise and from 11am to 2pm it was at its height.

The borough engineer, Mr E. I. Lord, took a desperate step to relieve the pressure of water backing up into the town area. At about 10am he sent a gang of workmen to the Blaketown area. Near the site of the old powder magazine, a channel was cut between the lagoon and the sea and helped prevent even worse damage to the town.

The work of rescuing was accomplished with boats and vehicles with great difficulty getting some families out of their flood-surrounded homes. The whole of the Greymouth business area was under water. In the quay below Tainui Street and in Mackay Street, Hospital (now Guinness Street), Boundary and Albert Streets and Richmond Quay, dangerously deep streams were rushing down, tearing the thoroughfare up in all directions. The water was rushing over the top of the wharf and tearing away the embankments, undermining and destroying the railway tracks along Māwhera Quay.

The Brian Boru, Albion, Club, Caledonian, Commercial, Imperial, Oriental and Criterion Hotels all faced the full force of the rushing water as it poured over the wharf. The Imperial Hotel had a concrete cellar and as there was no means of getting rid of the water, one of the fire brigade's manual pumps was brought in on Monday morning.

Though the ships in port had a trying time at the height of the flood, no damage was reported. One large snag was caught in the wharf between the hydraulic cranes but this was removed on Monday afternoon. The Greymouth Bar which had been shallow for a number of weeks, had 24 feet of water with a straight channel to sea. In consequence, shipping movements were unhampered, vessels taking away full cargoes.

At Coal Creek several settlers lost nearly all their stock while several of them, with their families, were perched on the tops of buildings until mid-day on Saturday before being rescued. Further up the Grey Valley, settlers were heavy losers, large numbers of cattle, sheep and horses being drowned.

Railway traffic was completely suspended with a number of wash-outs on the Greymouth-Reefton and Greymouth-Otira lines. There was one wash-out on the Greymouth-Hokitika line but traffic on this section resume on the Saturday afternoon.

The water began to recede about 4pm and by 10pm the main thoroughfares in the town were clear. Huge holes had been torn in the main streets and the estimated cost of repairs was 500 pounds. The flood proved disastrous for the district as the completion of the railway was postponed indefinitely. An embankment in the form of a wing dam, a distance of 10 or 12 chains and almost a year's work, was completely levelled. The damage here was estimated at 2,000 pounds.

=== Biggest Since 1887 (1936) ===
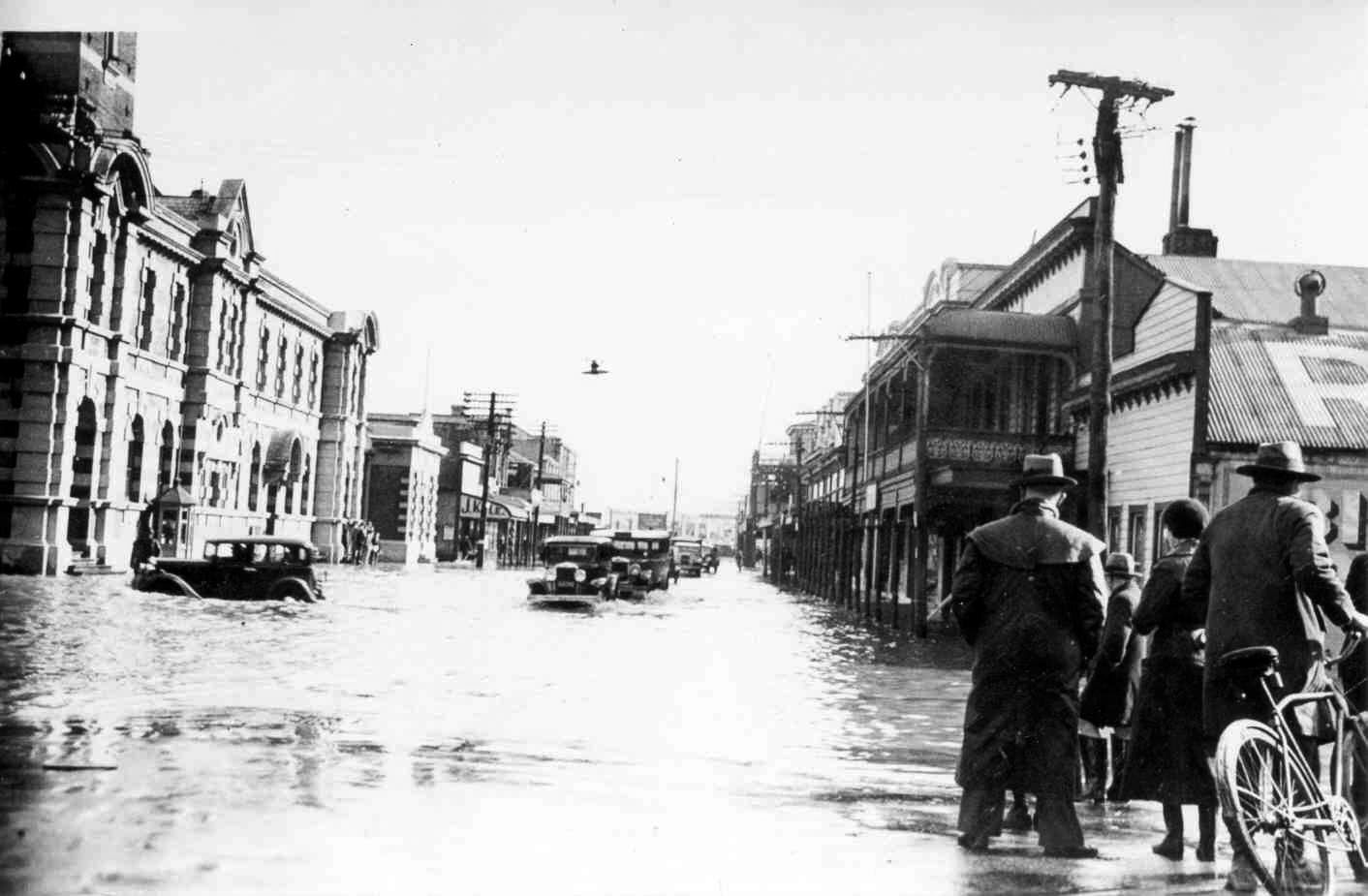
1936 Greymouth Flood

What was described as a once in 50 year flood, Greymouth felt the effects of 55 mm of rain over a 36 hour period, 35 mm of which fell in six hours causing the Grey River to breach its banks on Saturday, 10 October 1936. The rising floodwaters, backed up by the tide, forced gaping holes in the railway ballast and protection works at the lower end of the town. Within a comparatively short time the waters had reached as far as the railway line, extending from Tainui Street to Karoro. For over five hours the raging river continued to overflow. With the fall of the tide shortly after 9 o'clock, the situation eased and the waters started receding until noon when little water remained on the streets in the business area.

There were no deaths but many narrow escapes were recorded, rescue work being done by many who secured rowboats.

When the waters cleared, a thick layer of silt covered the inundated areas. Great as was the loss in Greymouth, it was a fraction of the enormous damage in the Grey Valley. Thousands of pounds worth of stock was swept down the Grey River and its tributaries, some farmers losing hundreds of pounds worth.

At its height in this flood, the Grey River was running at 12 knots (22 km/h). Older residents, who retained marks on the walls of their homes, indicated that the waters were 9 inches (230 mm) higher than in 1913.

=== Biggest Since 1936 (1977) ===
On Tuesday, 18 January 1977 the Grey River burst its banks at 1.30am sending a torrent of water through the main business area. A state of civil emergency was declared by the district civil defence controller, Mayor O. H. Jackson at 3.30am. The flooding was described as the worst in Greymouth since the big flood in March 1936.

The burst bank occurred almost opposite the Tainui Street – Māwhera Quay corner, flooding dozens of shops, hotels and other businesses. Blaketown, Cobden and the Arney-Leonard Street area bore the brunt of the damage to homes and about 40 people had to be evacuated. Flood water was five feet deep in some houses. Mayor Jackson closed the town centre to sightseers although some businesses re-opened by mid-afternoon.

The state of emergency was in place until 4pm on Saturday 22 January to allow the town centre to be cleared of silt. Mr Jackson saw this flood proved the need for a flood protection wall.

=== The Big One (May 1988) ===
In 1988 flooding occurred in May and September. The May event brought flooding to the entire West Coast, particularly the Greymouth area. On the morning of 19 May, warnings were broadcast (locally on Radio Scenicland) that up to 150mm of rain was expected in the Greymouth area, and with heavy rain already falling in the back country, this posed a serious threat of flooding. By 5pm the rivers up country were running approximately 30cms higher than the level of the November 1984 flood. It was predicted the Grey River would come over the wharf at 10pm. At 8.30pm it was decided to close the town from the railway crossings at Herbert, Tarapuhi, Albert and Tainui Streets and Māwhera Quay. By 9pm the lagoons were overflowing and water was entering houses and businesses in Blaketown and the lower town areas. Water was pouring through the Richmond Hotel at 9.20pm. The river was running at 14.5 knots against a heavy sea.

A Civil Defence Emergency was declared for the Greymouth Borough on 20 May, and roads and properties suffered damage. Four hundred people had to be evacuated with 102 houses affected and 2 being condemned.

Greymouth floods of May 1988

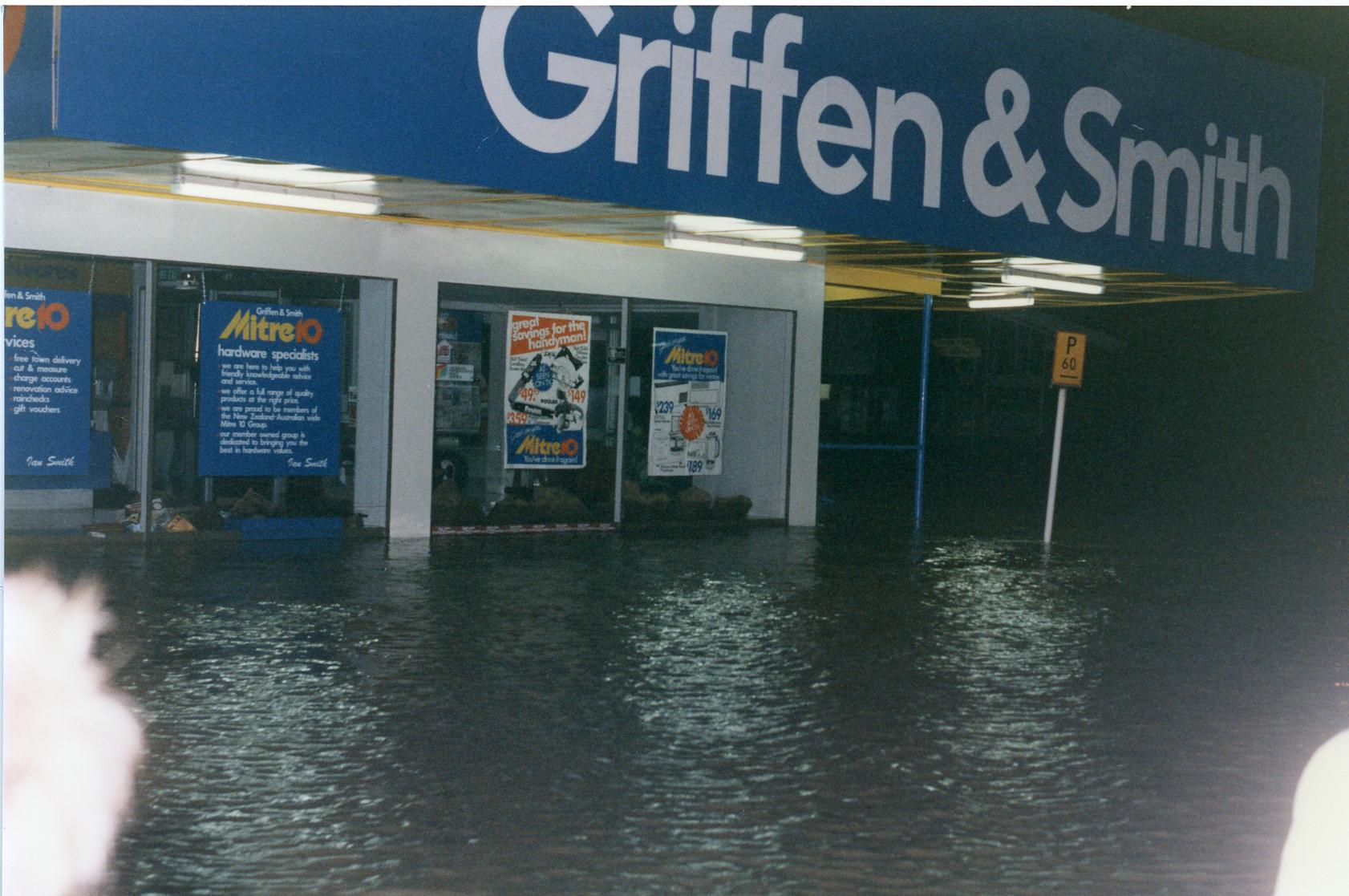

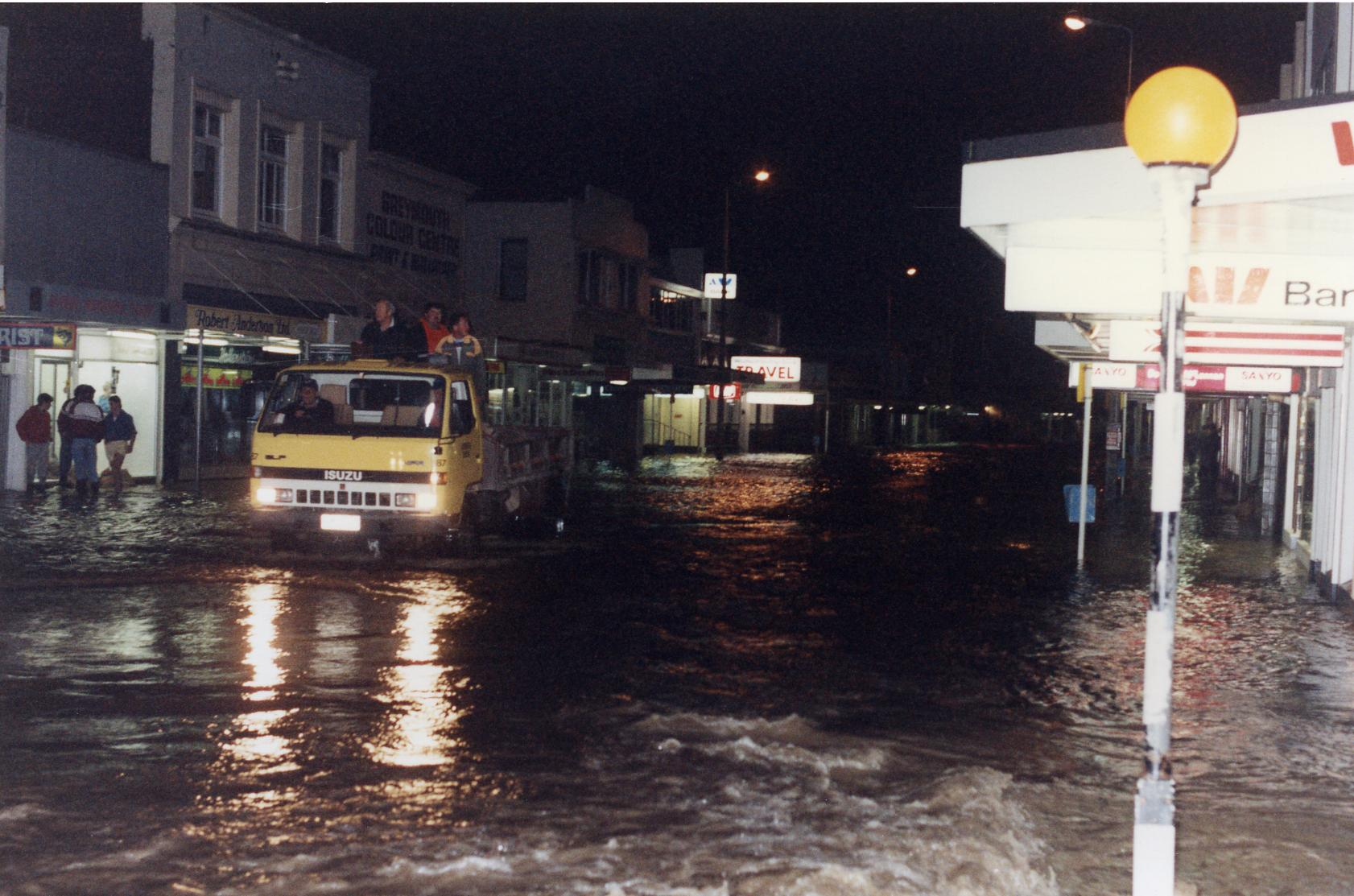

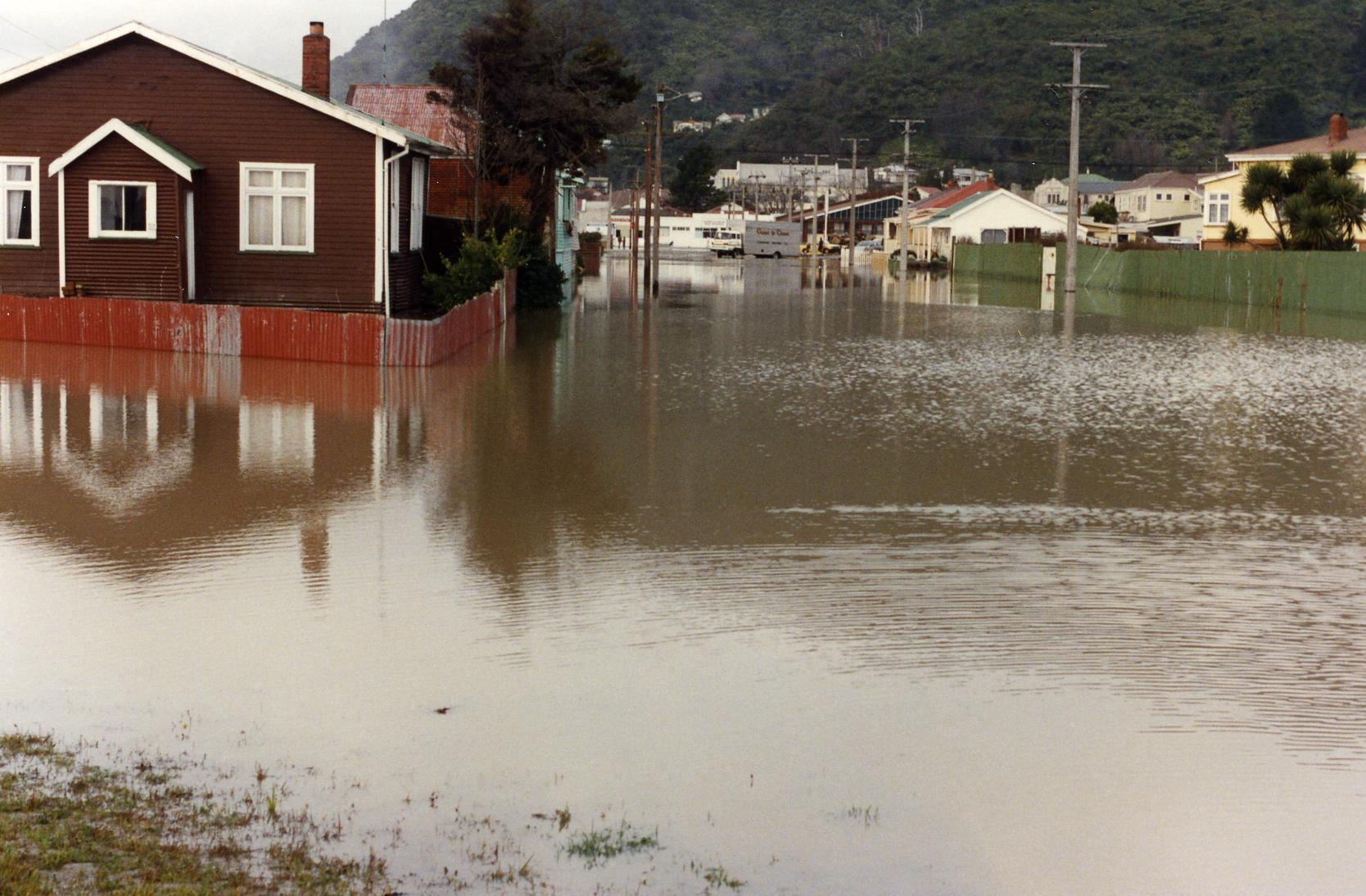

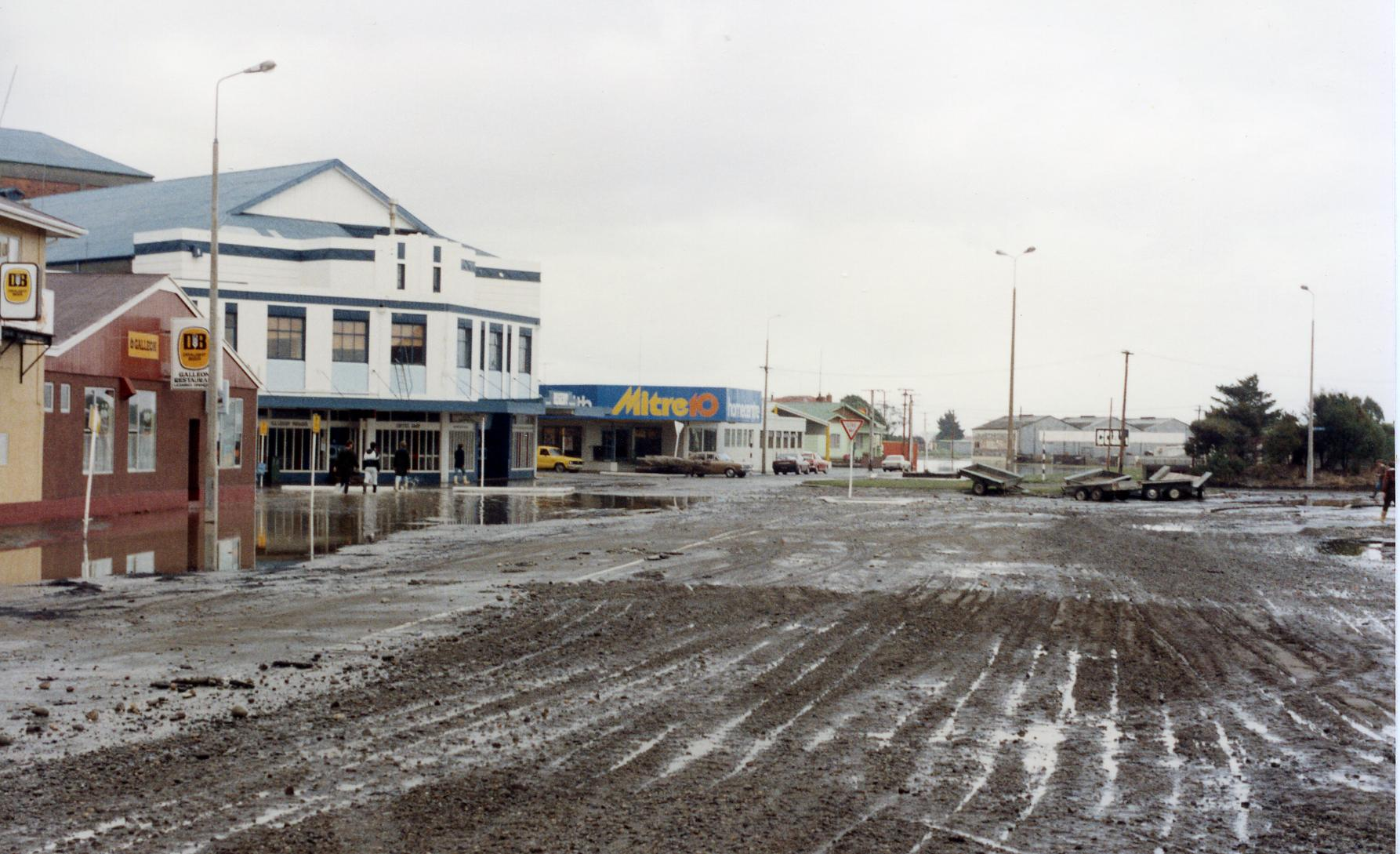

=== The Biggest One (September 1988) ===
On Monday 12 September 1988 farmers were warned to move stock to high ground. The Meteorological Service advised that up to 250mm of rain would fall in the region over a 36 hour period. By mid afternoon, all rivers and creeks in the Grey catchment rose rapidly over the next few hours. By 8.30am on Tuesday 13 September the river was spilling its banks at Richmond Quay, the Blaketown lagoons were overflowing and water was starting to enter houses. Heavy seas combined with a high tide left no doubt the flooding would be disastrous. When the river peaked about 3.35pm it was overflowing its banks from the Cobden Bridge to the Railways goods shed in Gresson Street to a depth of one metre. The Greymouth aerodrome runways were under more than a metre of water and the basement of the Greymouth Hospital was flooded. The whole town was a lake. Over 300 people had to be evacuated, many by jet boat from Blaketown, Kaiata and Coal Creek.

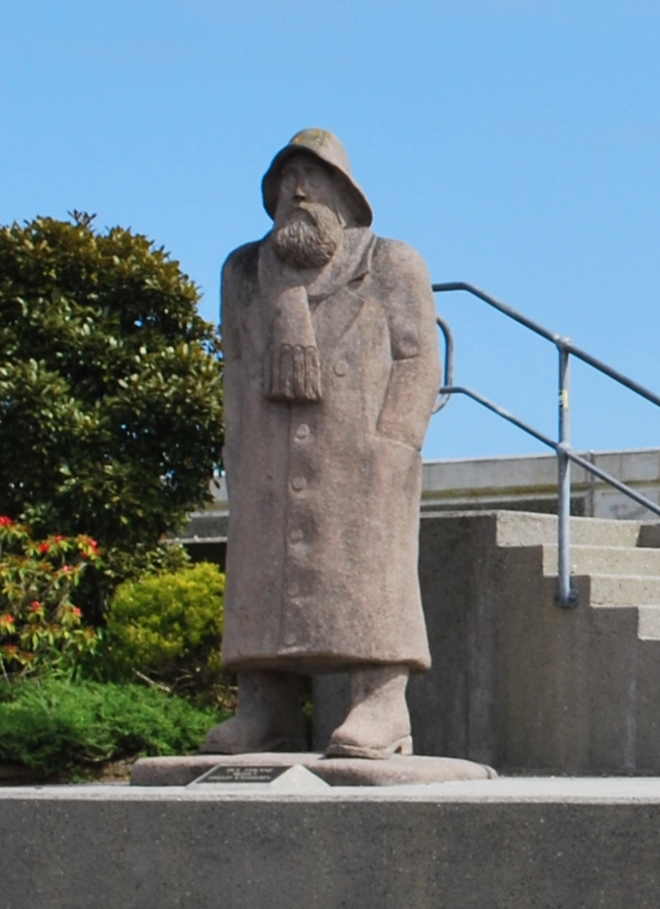
Statue commemorating volunteer work in the 1988 floods

A state of regional civil emergency was declared. The flooding caused two massive landslips, one of which claimed the life of Rewanui mine site caretaker, Keith Butler, as it swept away the old bath house there. Overall damage was extensive: there were broken stormwater, sewerage and high pressure service lines, smashed shop windows and goods scattered throughout the town which was several centimetres deep in silt, much of it contaminated with oil and sewage. For several days the town was under curfew to allow the cleanup to proceed.

== Flood protection ==
After the floods of 1988, the mayor of Greymouth, Barry Dallas, embarked on an ambitious project to build a flood protection wall. The wall was completed in September 1990 at an overall cost of NZ$4m: 80% from the New Zealand government and 20% from Grey District Council. Since its completion, river flooding has not affected the town again. Construction of the floodwall necessitated the removal of a train line which had been there previously. To commemorate the work of the hundreds of locals who helped sandbag, fruitlessly, against the 1988 floods, and who assisted in the cleanup afterwards, the town erected a statue of a fisherman on the new flood wall. Cast in concrete by local sculptor Stephan Newby, a plaque at its base has the dedication "To those who help others".
