= River City FM =

- Whanganui; New Zealand
- Frequencies: 89.6 MHz; 1197 KHz until 2001

Programming
- Language: English language
- Format: Adult contemporary

Ownership
- Owner: Radio New Zealand until 1996; The Radio Network after 1996

History
- First air date: 1949; 77 years ago

Technical information
- Transmitter coordinates: 39.9299418°S 175.0490149°E

River City FM was a radio station in Whanganui, New Zealand.

The station was started by Radio New Zealand (which was known as the National Broadcasting Service at the time) in October 1949 broadcasting on 1200AM with the callsign 2XA. The callsign was later changed to 2ZW and the station was rebranded as 2ZW.

In 1978 2ZW moved to 1197AM after New Zealand changed from 10 kHz spacing on the AM band to 9 kHz spacing. 2ZW was rebranded as River City Radio in 1988 and 89.6 River City FM in December 1993 after the station began broadcasting on 89.6FM.

In July 1996 the New Zealand Government sold off the commercial arm of Radio New Zealand; the sale included River City FM. The new owner was The Radio Network, a subsidiary of APN News & Media and Clear Channel Communications, which operated as a division of the Australian Radio Network.

In 1998 The Radio Network grouped all their local stations in smaller markets together to form the Community Radio Network. River City FM continued to run a local breakfast show between 6 am and 10 am but outside breakfast all stations part of the Community Radio Network took network programming from a central studio based in Taupo.

In 2001 the Community Radio Network was discontinued and all stations become part of the Classic Hits FM network, as a result River City FM was rebranded as Classic Hits 89.6 River City FM. The station continued to run a local breakfast but now outside breakfast all programming originated from the Classic Hits studios in Auckland. At the same time the original 1197AM frequency was replaced with Newstalk ZB.

On 28 April 2014, all stations part of the Classic Hits network were rebranded as The Hits. A networked breakfast presented by Polly Gillespie and Grant Kereama was introduced to almost all The Hits stations with the former breakfast announcer moved to present a 6-hour show between 9 am and 3 pm. The local daytime programme was presented by Jesse Archer for a time, and was also be heard on The Hits Manawatu.

The station was located on the corner of Guyton and Campbell Streets, Whanganui. There is no local programming on the station today.

The station is now branded as The Hits 89.6

== See also ==
- Radio in New Zealand
