= Lakeland FM =

- Taupō; New Zealand
- Frequency: 96.8 MHz

Programming
- Language: English language
- Format: Adult contemporary

Ownership
- Owner: Radio New Zealand until 1996; The Radio Network after 1996

History
- First air date: 1960; 66 years ago
- Former call signs: 1ZA

Technical information
- Transmitter coordinates: 38.685673°S 176.0695057°E

Lakeland FM was a New Zealand radio station based in Taupō.

The station was started by Radio New Zealand (which at the time was known as the National Broadcasting Service) in the 1960s as Radio Lakeland at 1500AM with the call sign 1ZA. Radio Lakeland also broadcast in Turangi on 1390AM with the call sign 1ZT. In 1978 after AM band in New Zealand was changed from 10 kHz spacing to 9 kHz spacing the Taupō station moved to 1494AM and the Turangi station moved to 1386AM.

In 1988 the station began broadcasting on 96.7FM in Taupō with the AM frequency later being taken over by National Radio in 1989. In 1988 the station ceased broadcasting in Turangi but later returned on 89.6FM and then moved to 92.4FM. The station became known on air as Lakeland FM in 1989.

In July 1996 the New Zealand Government sold off the commercial arm of Radio New Zealand, the sale included Lakeland FM. The new owner was The Radio Network, a subsidiary of APN News & Media and Clear Channel Communications, which operated as a division of the Australian Radio Network.

In 1998 The Radio Network grouped all their local stations in smaller markets together to form the Community Radio Network. Lakeland FM became the host of the Community Radio Network, Lakeland FM and all other stations retained their local identity and ran a local breakfast show followed by networked programming from the Lakeland FM Taupō studios.

In 2000, the relay to Turangi (92.4FM) was replaced with Radio Hauraki but listeners in Turangi could now tune to the Taupō frequency (96.7FM) to hear Lakeland FM and later that year the Community Radio Network was discontinued, and all stations became part of the Classic Hits FM network, as a result, Lakeland FM was rebranded as Classic Hits Lakeland FM. The station continued to run a local breakfast but now outside of breakfast all programming originated from the Classic Hits studios in Auckland, as a result, the Taupō-based shows were discontinued.

In 2010, the station adjusted its frequency to 96.8FM as part of the NZ Government's change of FM frequencies. The station became known as Classic Hits 96.8.

In 2014 all stations on the Classic Hits network were rebranded as The Hits. As a result, the station became known as The Hits 96.8. The rebranding of the station coincided with a change in the station lineup, including a networked breakfast presented by Polly Gillespie and Grant Kareama. Most regions had their former breakfast announcer move to a newly introduced local 9 am – 3 pm timeslot. For Taupō, the change meant the end of all local programming on the station as now between 9 am and 3 pm The Hits in Taupō shares the same programming as The Hits Rotorua with Paul Hickey presenting this show from Rotorua.
