= Geyserland FM =

Rotorua, New Zealand; New Zealand
- Broadcast area: Rotorua, New Zealand
- Frequency: 97.5 MHz

Programming
- Language: English language
- Format: Adult contemporary

Ownership
- Owner: Radio New Zealand until 1996; The Radio Network after 1996

History
- First air date: 1959; 67 years ago
- Former call signs: 1ZC, 1GEY

Technical information
- Transmitter coordinates: 38.1346°S 176.2542°E

Geyserland FM was a radio station in Rotorua, New Zealand.

== History ==
The station was originally started in 1959 by Radio New Zealand (which at the time was known as the National Broadcasting Service) on 1350AM, the station was originally branded as its callsign 1ZC.

The studios were originally located on Eruera Street in Rotorua, but moved to Arawa Street on 14 October 1967. The station was also rebranded as Radio Geyserland.

In 1988 Radio Geyserland began broadcasting on 97.5FM and became known as 97.5 Geyserland FM using the callsign 1GEY. The 1350AM frequency was discontinued and later was assigned to independent station Today AM and eventually taken over by Radio Sport.

In 1993 Radio New Zealand rebranded many of their heritage stations as Classic Hits. For Geyserland FM the station became known as Classic Hits 97FM. The name Geyserland was no longer used on air, however it still appeared on the station's logo.

In July 1996 the New Zealand Government sold off the commercial arm of Radio New Zealand, which included, among other things, the Classic Hits branded stations. The new owner was The Radio Network, a subsidiary of APN News & Media and Clear Channel Communications, which operated as a division of the Australian Radio Network.

In 1998 Classic Hits 97FM was reduced to just 4 hours of local programming between 6 and 10 am 7 days a week. Outside this time nationwide shows based from Auckland took over, and the announcers simply called the station Classic Hits. The breakfast show was shortened to a 3-hour show in 2012 on all Classic Hits stations.

The station can also be heard in Reporoa, Broadlands, Ngakuru and Waikite Valley areas on 90.8FM. The frequency was adjusted from 90.9FM to 90.8 in 2010.

On 28 April 2014 all stations part of the Classic Hits network were rebranded as The Hits. A networked breakfast presented by Polly Gillespie and Grant Kareama was introduced to almost all The Hits stations with the former breakfast announcer moved to present a 6-hour show between 9 am and 3 pm. The daytime show is presented by Paul Hickey and can also be heard on The Hits Taupo. The studios are now located on Fenton Street in Rotorua.
