= Magic 828 & 98.6FM =

New Zealand
- Broadcast area: Palmerston North, New Zealand
- Frequencies: 828AM & 98.6FM

Programming
- Format: Easy Listening

Ownership
- Owner: RadioWorks

History
- First air date: 1986
- Call sign meaning: 2XS

Technical information
- Power: 300 Watts
- Transmitter coordinates: 40.2546°S 175.8578°E

Magic 828 & 98.6FM was a radio station in Manawatu, New Zealand. The station was first started in 1986 as Bright and Easy 828 by the operators of 2XS FM on 828AM the frequency previously used by 2XS before the station switched to FM. Bright and Easy 828 used the 2XS call sign while the call sign for 2XS FM was actually 2XXS. The station played a mixture of Classic Hits and Easy Listening music.

In 1988 the station actually became 828 2XS and later Classic Hits 2XS followed by Classic Hits 828. In 1993 the station began broadcasting on 98.6FM and was renamed to Classic Hits 828 & 98.6FM. The renaming to Classic Hits was in no way connected to radio stations around New Zealand rebranding to Classic Hits FM as it was radio stations operated by Radio New Zealand that were affected by this change. However, with the station named Classic Hits 828 this prevented local Radio New Zealand station 98FM (formally 2ZA) from rebranding as Classic Hits and instead became Greatest Hits 98FM using the Classic Hits logo.

In 1994 the station was renamed to Magic 828 & 98.6FM and as a result Greatest Hits 98FM was able to take on the Classic Hits name.

Magic 828 & 98.6FM and 2XS were later sold to RadioWorks with both stations becoming part of RadioWorks group of local stations known as LocalWorks. In 2004 Magic 828 and 98.6FM was rebranded as The Breeze. In 2005 the 828AM frequency was replaced by Radio Pacific after the Radio Pacific frequency in the Manawatu was used to launch Radio Live, Radio Pacific became BSport in 2007. After Magic was rebranded as The Breeze programming remained live and local but in 2007 all programming outside breakfast was replaced with network programming from Auckland. The breakfast show remains live and local (Breakfast with Chris 'Burnzee' Burn) and was not affected by the recent introduction of a network breakfast on The Breeze.
