= 2ZA =

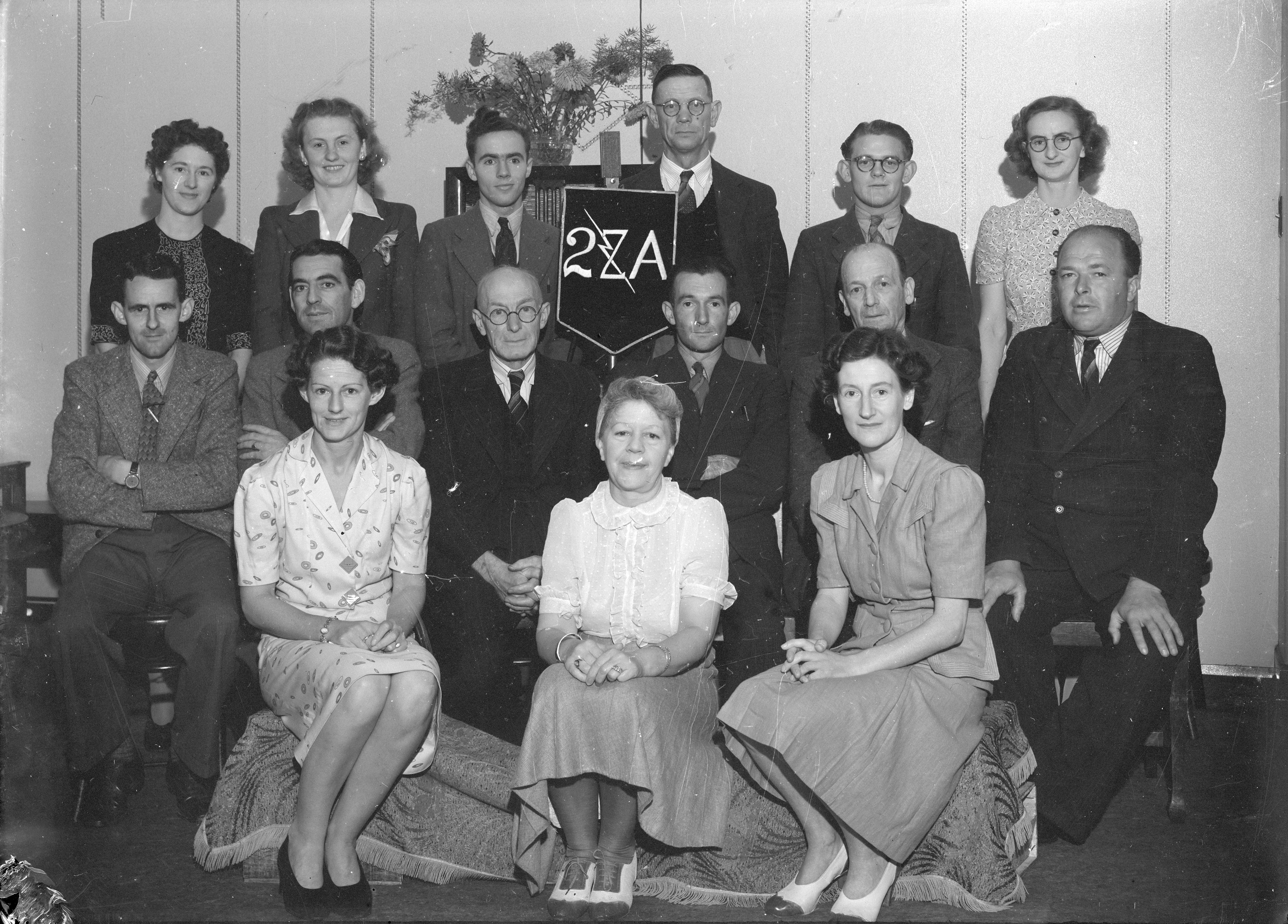

Palmerston North; New Zealand
- Broadcast area: Manawatu
- Frequencies: 97.8 MHz; 927 KHz until 1994

Programming
- Language: English language
- Format: Adult contemporary

Ownership
- Owner: Radio New Zealand until 1996; The Radio Network after 1996

Technical information
- Transmitter coordinates: 40.3518459°S 175.6182481°E

2ZA was a radio station in Palmerston North, New Zealand.

== History ==
=== Early years ===
2ZA was started by Radio New Zealand, which, in 1938, was known as the National Broadcasting Service, broadcasting on 940AM. The station was branded as call sign 2ZA. In 1978 the station moved to 927AM after New Zealand changed from 10 kHz spacing on the AM band to 9 kHz spacing.

=== Switch to FM ===
In 1991 2ZA began broadcasting on 97.8FM in addition to the 927AM frequency. On air the station became known as AM-FM 2ZA. In September 1992 AM-FM 2ZA was divided into two separate stations. The FM frequency was relaunched as a music station as The New 98FM and later shortened to 98FM, the AM frequency was used to run talkback, news and sports shows as The Manawatu's 2ZA.

=== Rebranding as Greatest Hits 98FM ===
In 1993 Radio New Zealand began rebranding most of their local heritage stations as Classic Hits. At the time of rebranding there was already a local independent station in the Manawatu market branded as Classic Hits 828 and 98.6FM as a result Radio New Zealand chose to rename 98FM as Greatest Hits 98FM instead of Classic Hits, the station used the same logo as the other Classic Hits stations and on air imaging was similar to all other Classic Hits stations. At the same time the 927AM frequency used to broadcast The Manawatu's 2ZA was used to launch network station Newstalk ZB into the Manawatu with some local content initially retained.

In 1994 rival station Classic Hits 828 and 98.6FM was rebranded as Magic 828 & 98.6FM and as result Radio New Zealand were able to rename Greatest Hits 98FM to Classic Hits 97.8FM.

=== Change of ownership and reduction in local programming ===
In July 1996 the New Zealand Government sold off the commercial arm of Radio New Zealand, which included, among other things, the Classic Hits branded stations. The new owner was The Radio Network, a subsidiary of APN News & Media and Clear Channel Communications, which operated as a division of the Australian Radio Network.

In 1997 Classic Hits 97.8FM was renamed to Classic Hits ZAFM, at the time Southland's Classic Hits station was also known as Classic Hits ZAFM.

In 1998 Classic Hits ZAFM was reduced to just 4 hours of local programming between 6 and 10 am 7 days a week. Outside this time nationwide shows based from Auckland took over, and the announcers simply called the station Classic Hits. The breakfast show was shortened to a 3-hour show in 2012 on all Classic Hits stations and local weekend programming removed.

In 2001 branding was changed to Classic Hits 97.8 ZAFM and changed to Classic Hits 97.8 in 2008.

=== Rebranding as The Hits ===
On 28 April 2014, all stations part of the Classic Hits network were rebranded as The Hits. A networked breakfast presented by Polly Gillespie and Grant Kareama was introduced to almost all The Hits stations with the former breakfast announcer moved to present a 6-hour show between 9am and 3pm. The Hits Wanganui daytime show presented by Daryl Mallett was networked into Manawatu. Between 2017 until around 2020, the day show was presented by Jesse Archer, live from the Main Street studio, however there is no longer any local programming on the station.
