= 2XS FM =

New Zealand radio station

Coordinates: 40.355746°S 175.61219°E

New Zealand
- Broadcast area: Palmerston North, New Zealand
- Frequency: 92.2 FM
- RDS: 1.2XS; 2.FM
- Branding: 2XS FM

Programming
- Format: Adult Contemporary

Ownership
- Owner: RadioWorks

History
- Call sign meaning: 2XS

Technical information
- Power: 5000 Watts

2XS FM is a radio station in Palmerston North, New Zealand. 2XS started on 29 May 1981 at 8:28 in the morning, broadcasting on 828AM, the name was taken from the stations call sign 2XS. In 1986 2XS began broadcasting on 92.2FM with the call sign 2XXS and the station became known as 92.2XS FM.

The 828AM frequency was later used by 2XS FM to start a second station Bright and Easy 828AM, this station was later known as Classic Hits 828 (no connection to Classic Hits FM network) before becoming Magic 828 & 98.6FM.

The station has enjoyed a significant market share, anchored by local long-serving breakfast host Mike West, since the early 1990s. A string of personalities have worked on the station, including Stu Tolan (MORE FM network), Dom Harvey (under his pseudonym Baldrick; The Edge Breakfast), Mark Smith (Sound/Magic Network), Robert Scott (The Breeze Drive), Martin Good (Classic Hits Hawkes Bay Breakfast), Hamish McKay (Newshub sports presenter) and others.

In 1998, 2XS FM and Magic 828/98.6FM, along with the rest of the XS Radio Group, were sold to RadioWorks and became part of RadioWorks group of local stations known as LocalWorks. In 2005 2XS FM was rebranded as MORE FM when RadioWorks rebranded the majority of their local Adult Contemporary music stations as MORE FM.

Radio industry commentators speculated on its return to its original format on a different frequency with original branding. This eventually happened in 2021, when 2XS relaunched under a different owner, broadcasting on 1548AM, 106.7FM (low power) or via an online stream.

In a growing trend in NZ radio, MORE FM Manawatu has increased its networked programming from Auckland, particularly across the weekend.

== Awards ==
- 1997 New Zealand Radio Award finalist – Regional Station of the Year
- 1998 New Zealand Radio Award – Best Music & Entertainment Team – Regional – Mike West & Baldrick
- 1998 New Zealand Radio Award – Regional Station of the Year
- 1999 New Zealand Radio Award – Best Music & Entertainment Team – Regional – Mike West & Baldrick
- 1999 New Zealand Radio Award – Outstanding Community Campaigns
- 1999 New Zealand Radio Award finalist – Regional Station of the Year
- 2000 New Zealand Radio Award finalist – Best Music & Entertainment Team – Regional – Mike West & Baldrick
- 2000 New Zealand Radio Award finalist – Best Individual Air Personality, Talk Host or Interviewer – Regional – Stewart Tolan
- 2000 New Zealand Radio Award – Station of the Year – Regional
- 2001 New Zealand Radio Award finalist – Best Music & Entertainment Team – Regional – Mike West & Baldrick
- 2001 New Zealand Radio Award – finalist – Programmer of the Year – Darren Wallace
- 2002 New Zealand Radio Award finalist – Best Music & Entertainment Team – Regional – Mike West & Stu Tolan
- 2003 New Zealand Radio Award – Best Music & Entertainment Team – Regional – Mike West & Stu Tolan
- 2005 New Zealand Radio Award – Best Music & Entertainment Team or Individual Breakfast Air Personality – Regional – Mike West & Gareth Pringle
- 2005 New Zealand Radio Award – Best Promotion of a Radio Station – Individual Station – The 2XS FM Joker – Mike West
- 2005 New Zealand Radio Award finalist – Best Client Promotion – Underwater Wedding 2004 – Mike West
- 2005 New Zealand Radio Award finalist – Station of the Year – Regional
- 2025 New Zealand Radio and Podcast Awards finalist - Independent Station Of the Year
