= Radio Northland =

Whangārei; New Zealand
- Broadcast area: Northland
- Frequencies: Russell - 106.1 MHz; Kaitaia/Kaikohe - 95.6 MHz; Doubtless Bay - 105.9 MHz; Whangārei - 95.6 MHz

Programming
- Language: English language
- Format: Adult contemporary

Ownership
- Owner: Radio New Zealand until 1996; The Radio Network after 1996

History
- First air date: 1949; 77 years ago
- Former call signs: 1ZN (Whangārei); 1ZE (Kaikohe); 1ZK (Kaitaia)

Technical information
- Transmitter coordinates: 35.7209301°S 174.320869°E

Radio Northland was a radio station based in Whangārei, New Zealand.

The station was started by Radio New Zealand (which at the time was known as the New Zealand Broadcasting Service) in 1949. The original callsign was 1XN and the station was originally known by this name, the callsign was later changed to 1ZN. The station originally broadcast on 970AM in Whangārei (callsign 1ZN), Kaikohe on 1220AM (callsign 1ZE) and Kaitaia on 1440AM (callsign 1ZK). On air the station later became known as Radio Northland. The station is located on Bank Street, Whangārei.

In 1978 after the AM band in New Zealand was changed from 10 kHz spacing to 9 kHz spacing the Whangārei and Kaitaia stations moved to 1026AM and the Kaikohe station moved to 1215AM.

In 1993 Radio New Zealand rebranded many of their heritage stations as Classic Hits. For Radio Northland the station became known as Classic Hits Radio Northland. The station was later renamed to Classic Hits Northland.

In July 1996 the New Zealand Government sold off the commercial arm of Radio New Zealand, which included, among other things, the Classic Hits branded stations. The new owner was The Radio Network, a subsidiary of APN News & Media and Clear Channel Communications, which operated as a division of the Australian Radio Network.

In 1998, Classic Hits Northland was reduced to just 4 hours of local programming between 6 and 10 am 7 days a week. Outside this time nationwide shows based from Auckland took over, and the network announcers simply called the station Classic Hits. The breakfast show was shortened to a 3-hour show in 2012 on all Classic Hits stations.

In 2001 Classic Hits Northland began broadcasting on 96.0FM in Whangārei in addition to the original AM frequencies. The 1026AM frequency in Whangārei was later replaced with network station Newstalk ZB, however the AM frequencies in Kaikohe and Kaitaia continued to broadcast Classic Hits Northland. In 2005 FM broadcasting of Classic Hits Northland was extended to Dargaville on 96.0FM, Kaikohe on 97.2FM, Kaitaia on 97.6FM and in 2006 broadcasting was extended to the Bay of Islands on 96.8FM. The remaining AM frequencies were now used to broadcast Newstalk ZB into Kaikohe and Kaitaia.

The station frequencies were adjusted in 2010 after an alignment of FM frequencies around New Zealand. Whangārei moved to 95.6FM, Kaikohe to 96.4FM, Kaitaia also to 96.4FM and the Bay of Islands to 106.1FM. Programming was also extended to Doubtless Bay on 105.9FM.

On April 28, 2014, all stations part of the Classic Hits network were rebranded as The Hits. A networked breakfast presented by Polly Gillespie and Grant Kareama was introduced to almost all The Hits stations with the former breakfast announcer Mike Plant moved to present a 6-hour show between 9 am and 3 pm. Today the local daytime show is presented by Charmaine Soljak.
