= Scenicland FM =

- Greymouth; New Zealand
- Broadcast area: West Coast
- Frequencies: Reefton - 97.5 MHz; Westport - 90.9 MHz; Greymouth - 90.7 MHz; Hokitika - 93.1 MHz; South Westland down to Haast - 90.5 MHz

Programming
- Language: English language
- Format: Adult contemporary

Ownership
- Owner: Radio New Zealand until 1996; The Radio Network after 1996

History
- First air date: 1968; 58 years ago

Technical information
- Transmitter coordinates: 42.4485959°S 171.2071324°E

Links
- Webcast: Livestream

Scenicland FM was a New Zealand radio station broadcasting on the West Coast of the South Island.

The station was started by the New Zealand Broadcasting Corporation (which later became Radio New Zealand) in 1968 as Radio Scenicland. Radio Scenicland originally transmitted on three AM frequencies from Radio House on Mackay Street, Greymouth. This building was demolished in late 2022 due to structural concerns following the Canterbury earthquakes in 2010 and 2011, and NZME's premises were relocated to Tainui Street.

Original callsigns are in brackets:

- 747 AM — Greymouth & Hokitika (3ZA)
- 1287 AM — Westport (3ZW)
- 1521 AM — Reefton (3ZR)

Radio Scenicland moved to FM to improve coverage on the Coast in November 1992 and after the move became Scenicland FM. As a result of the move to FM, the station relinquished the two AM frequencies of 747 AM & 1521 AM. The relinquishment of the 747 AM frequency, in particular, was due to poor signal coverage and poor soil quality at the Kumara AM transmitter site. The station initially transmitted in an FM mono signal until this was upgraded to FM stereo in late 1996 with further enhancements to the quality of the stereo signal in late 2000. The 1287 AM signal in Westport continued to transmit the Scenicland FM programme due to FM coverage issues along the Coast Road; in particular south of Charleston, until late 2007 when the transmitter was changed to Newstalk ZB.

In July 1996 the New Zealand Government sold off the commercial arm of Radio New Zealand, the sale included Scenicland FM. The new owner was The Radio Network, a subsidiary of APN News & Media and Clear Channel Communications, which operated as a division of the Australian Radio Network.

In 1998 The Radio Network grouped all their local stations in smaller markets together to form the Community Radio Network. Scenicland FM continued to run a local breakfast show between 6 am and 10 am, but outside breakfast all stations part of the Community Radio Network took network programming from a central studio based in Taupo.

In December 2000 the Community Radio Network was discontinued, and all stations become part of the Classic Hits FM network; as a result Scenicland FM was rebranded as Classic Hits Scenicland FM. The station continued to run a local breakfast, but now outside of breakfast all programming originated from the Classic Hits studios in Auckland.

On 28 April 2014, all stations part of the Classic Hits network were rebranded as The Hits. A networked breakfast presented by Polly Gillespie and Grant Kereama was introduced to almost all The Hits stations. A local show between 9 am and 3 pm was then introduced and presented by Andy Mack. Following his departure, Israel Bai took over the local show, until October 2016. With Polly and Grant leaving The Hits in 2017 all South Island stations reverted to local breakfast programming. Currently, there is no local programming on the station, and it is entirely networked.

Today, the station now known as The Hits West Coast can be heard on the following frequencies.

- 90.5FM — South Westland
- 90.9FM — Westport
- 90.7FM/93.1FM — Greymouth & Hokitika
- 97.5FM — Reefton
