= NZRB =

NZRB may stand for:

- New Zealand Rifle Brigade (Earl of Liverpool's Own), a military unit 1915–1919
- New Zealand Racing Board, now TAB New Zealand
