= Problem Gambling Foundation of New Zealand =

National non-profit combating problem gambling in New Zealand

- Abbreviation: PGF
- Predecessor: Compulsive Gambling Society
- Formation: 2001
- Type: Nonprofit
- Legal status: Foundation
- Purpose: Healthcare
- Services: Treatment counseling Public health promotion
- Affiliations: Ministry of Health
- Staff: 70 (2011)
- Website: Official website

The Problem Gambling Foundation of New Zealand (PGF) is a national non-profit organisation in New Zealand predominantly funded by the Ministry of Health with funds received from the gambling levy.

== History ==
PGF is the largest single treatment provider for problem gambling in Australasia, with over 60 locations throughout New Zealand and a staff of 70. Qualified counselors provide free, professional and confidential counseling services for gamblers and others affected by gambling; a dedicated public health team works on problem-gambling issues in the community with a health promotion approach.

PGF's Asian Family Services provides professional counseling and advice in Cantonese, Mandarin, Korean, Vietnamese, Khmer and Thai.

The PGF began as the Compulsive Gambling Society (CGS) in 1988 with funding from the New Zealand Lottery Grants Board. Psychiatrist Fraser McDonald helped three men who were experiencing problems with gambling establish the CGS because, at that time, there were no services available for gambling problems. CGS started out as a telephone service, with the first national hotline of its type beginning in 1992. As the need grew, services expanded to include face-to-face services; a second clinic was opened in Manurewa in 1993.

In 2001 The PGF succeeded the CGS, moving from an addictions and medical-based philosophy to a public-health approach.

== See also ==
- Gambling in New Zealand
