= Christchurch Casino =

Casino in Christchurch, New Zealand

Coordinates: 43°31′33″S 172°37′59″E

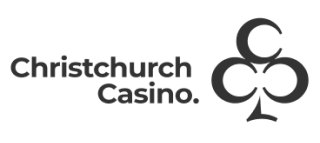
- Logo of Christchurch Casino

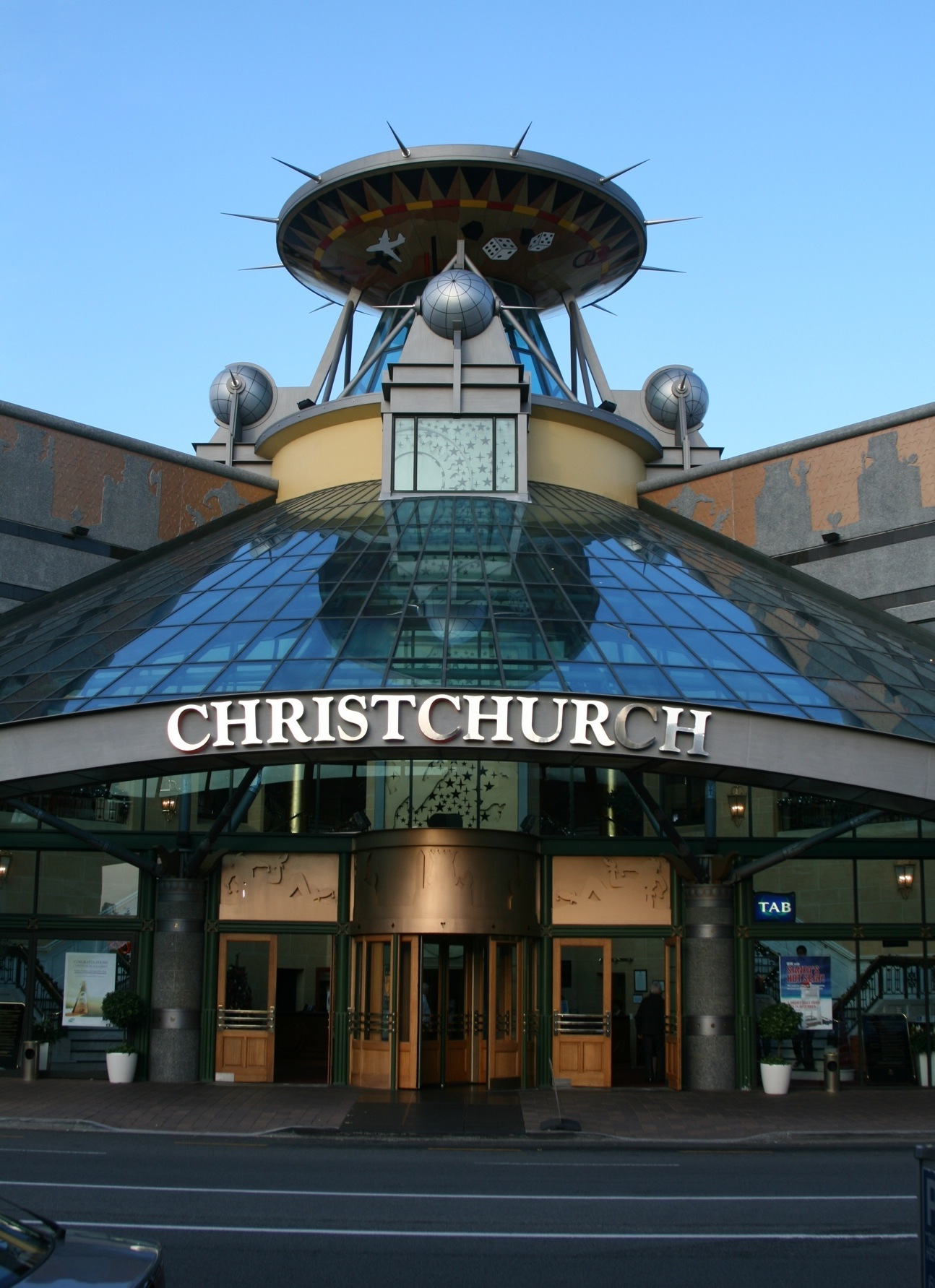
- Main entrance to Christchurch Casino on Victoria Street
- Interactive map of Christchurch Casino
- Location: 30 Victoria Street Christchurch, New Zealand
- Opened: 1994
- Gaming space: 4,087.5 m^{2} (43,998 sq ft)
- Casino type: Land
- Owner: Skyline Enterprises; Queenstown Tourist Co Limited
- Website: www.christchurchcasino.co.nz www.christchurchcasino.com

Christchurch Casino is a casino in Christchurch, New Zealand, owned by Skyline Entertainment. The 4,087.5 m^{2} (43,998 sq ft) casino was New Zealand's first when it opened in 1994. The casino operates four hundred fifty slot machines and thirty-two table games. The property has two restaurants, two bars and one cafe. Entry is restricted to patrons over 20 years of age.

== Ownership ==
Christchurch Casino is majority owned by Skyline Enterprises, it has undergone several changes in its ownership structure over its lifetime.

On 29 June 2004, SkyCity Entertainment Group announced that it had settled the acquisition of Aspinall (NZ) Limited, which held a 40.5% shareholding in Christchurch Casinos Limited. The purchase price was NZ$93.75 million (on a debt-free basis). The deal marked the end of an era for Aspinall.

Skyline Enterprises, which controls a 41 per cent stake in the casino, had opposed SkyCity's purchase of a matching stake from Aspinall earlier in 2004. As part of his resistance to the deal, Mr. Thomas refused to cooperate with overdue diligence. Skyline had attempted to purchase the 41 per cent stake from Aspinall but had been rebuffed.

Skyline Enterprises chairman Barry Thomas had objected to the SkyCity purchase on the basis that it gave SkyCity an interest in five out of six New Zealand casinos. The deal was nonetheless approved by both the Casino Control Authority and the Commerce Commission. In clearing SkyCity's application, the Commerce Commission said that the deal would not substantially restrict competition in the Auckland, Christchurch and Dunedin Casino entertainment markets.

SkyCity Entertainment Group Managing Director, Evan Davies, said that SkyCity's acquisition of the shares in Aspinall and its interest in CCL was a logical extension of its New Zealand operations and in line with the company's investment strategy. The acquisition was motivated in part by the 2003 Gambling Act which outlaws the opening of any new casinos in New Zealand.

In December 2012, both partners reached a deal, in which SkyCity sold its shares in the casino to Skyline for $80 million, and bought Skyline's 40% stake in SkyCity Queenstown for $5 million. As a result, Skyline Enterprises became the major owner of Christchurch Casino.

== Online operations ==
Christchurch launched its digital operations in 2000 under the brand Kiwi Gaming. They subsequently launched Fast Win casino in 2005. In 2007, Christchurch Casino was forced to exit its digital operations due to an order from the Kiwi government Internal Affairs Department.

In October 2023, to bypass New Zealand restrictions on online gambling, Christchurch Casino launched an online casino licensed by the Malta Gaming Authority. The business operates a partnership with White Hat Gaming to provide the platform and appointed Keith O'Loughlin as the Executive Chairman of the online business Chrischurchcasino.com Limited.

== Expansion plans ==
In November 2016, Christchurch Casino announced it would build a 200-room hotel. In September 2017, it purchased 4,047 square meters of adjacent bare land at auction. A revised plan for the hotel was confirmed in 2024, with an 11-storey hotel featuring 148 rooms being proposed.

== New Zealand Poker Championships ==
Christchurch hosts the New Zealand Poker Championships annually in August. This is one of the country's biggest events and can have a prize pool of up to $1m.

== Gallery ==
Original logo (1994–2021)

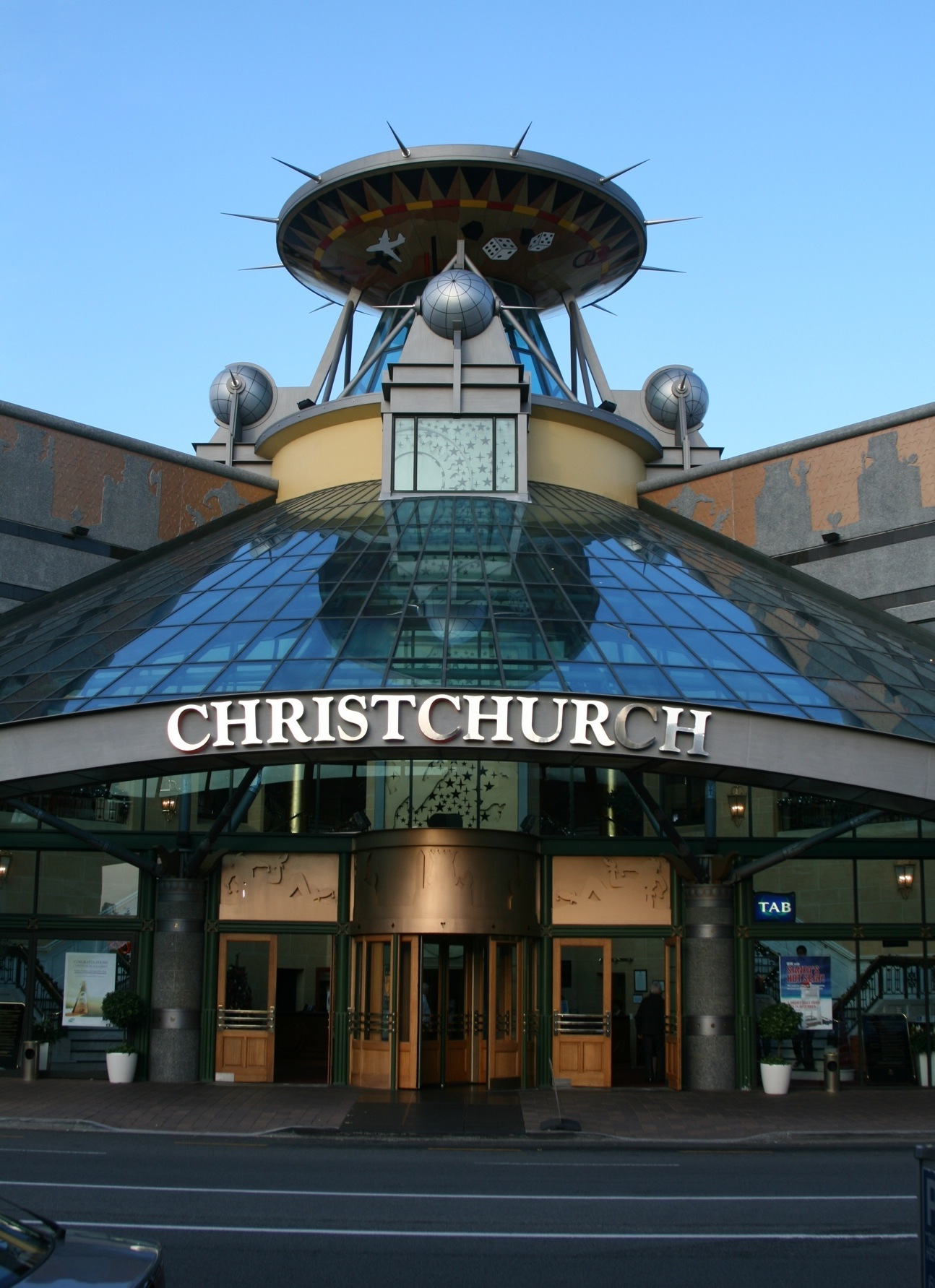
Main entrance

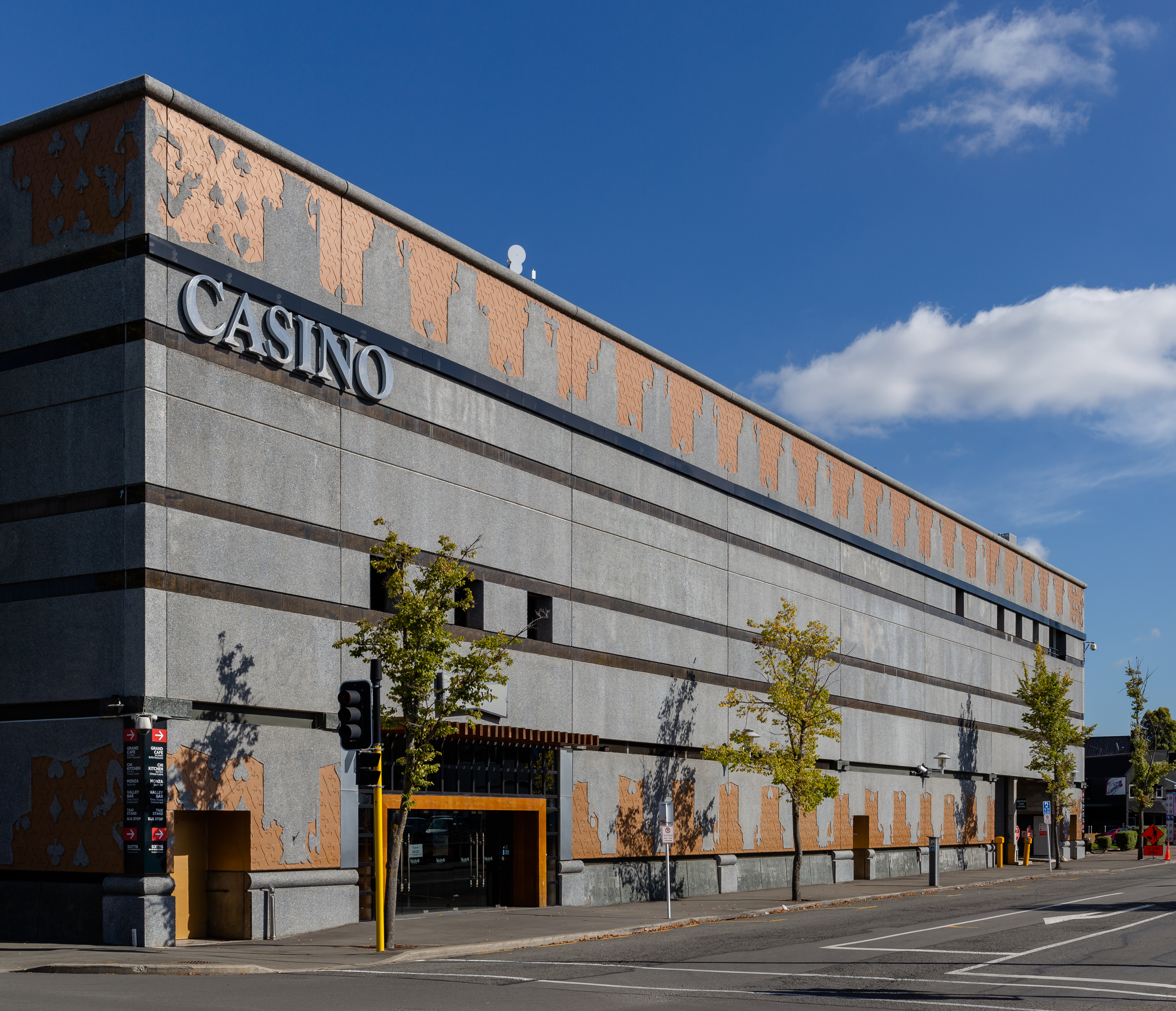
Back of the Casino

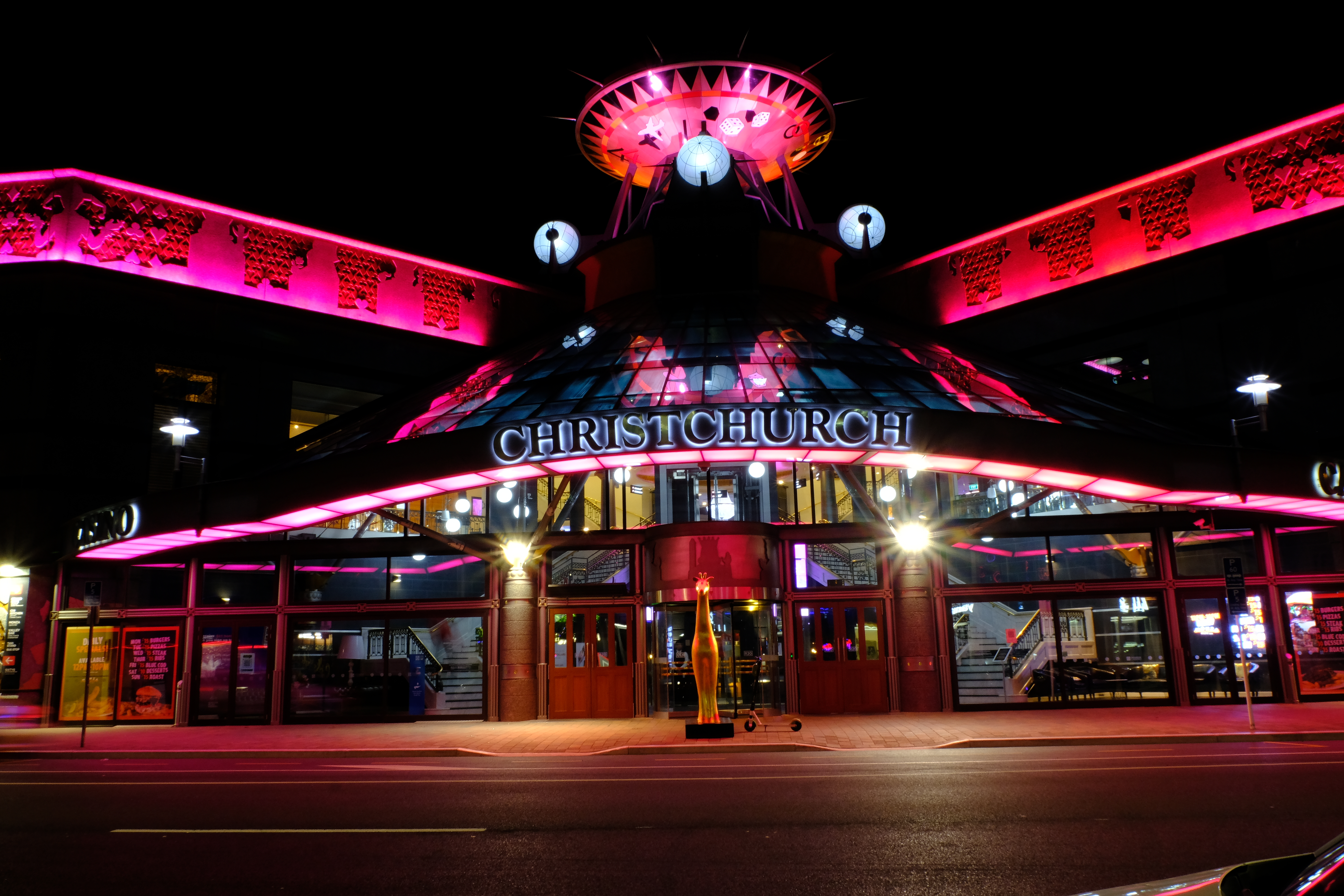
The casino at night

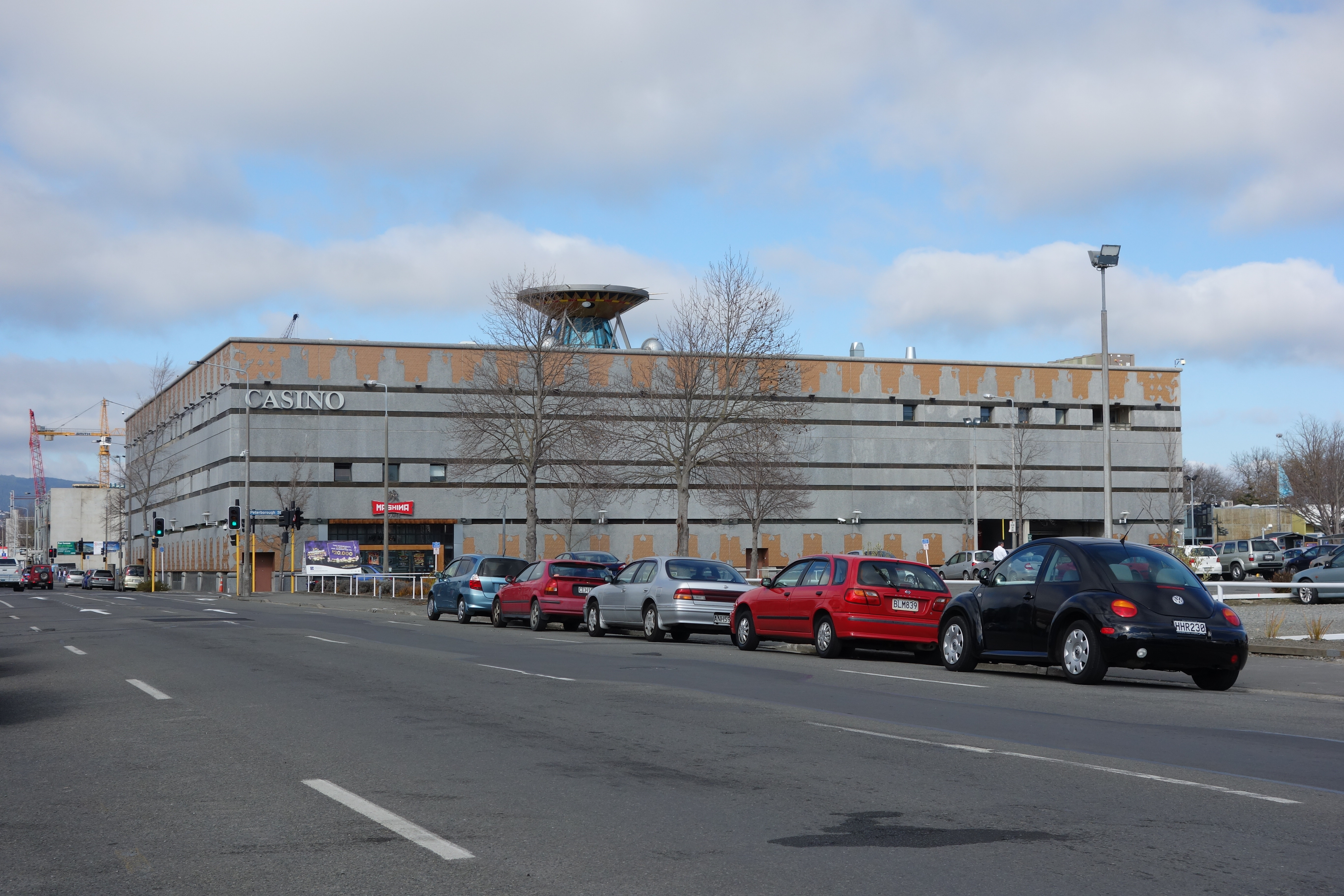
Back of the Casino

== See also ==
- Gambling in New Zealand
