= SkyCity Queenstown =

Casino in New Zealand

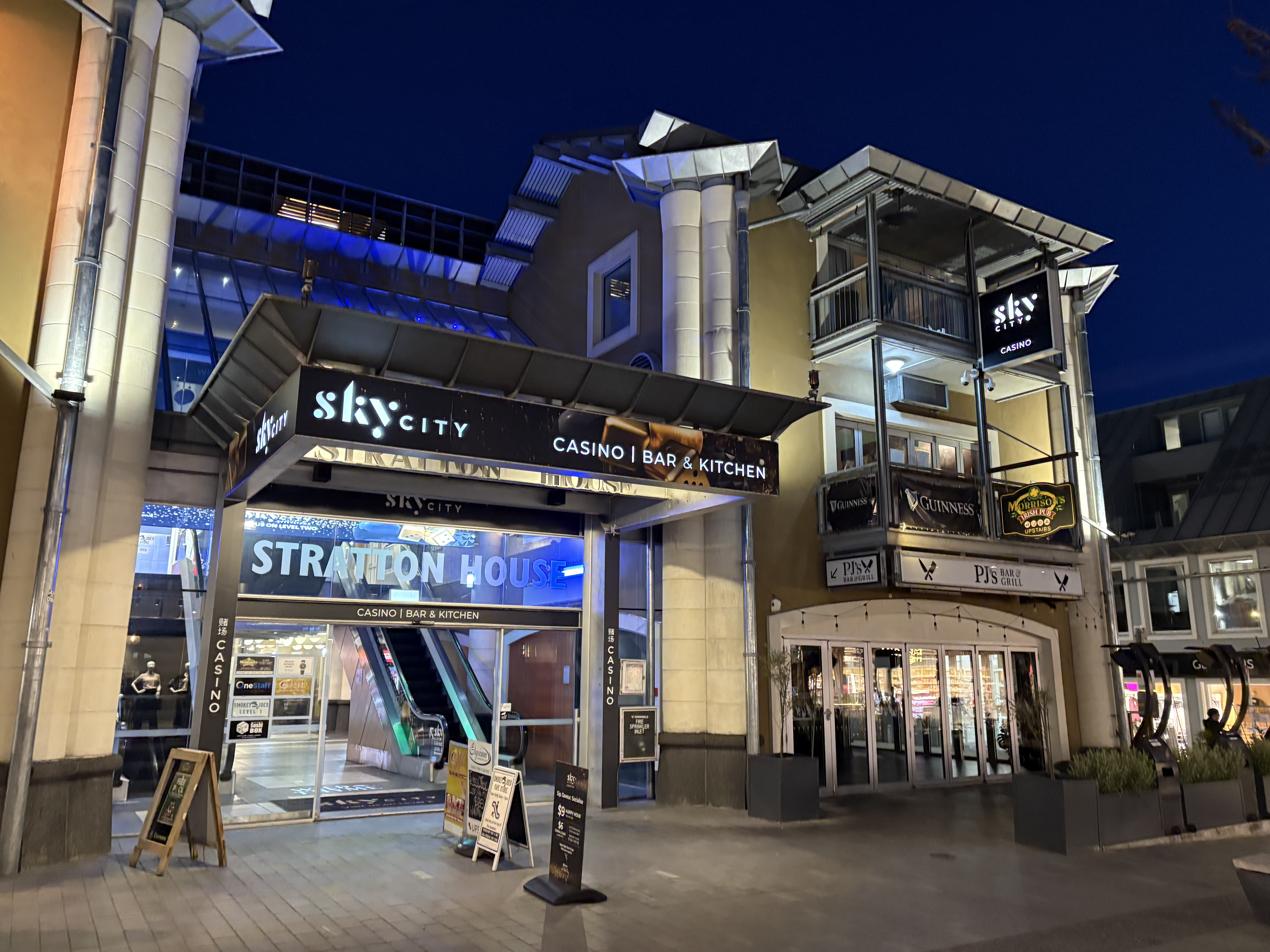
- Interactive map of Skycity Queenstown
- Location: 16–24 Beach Street, Queenstown, New Zealand; 45°01′55″S 168°39′37″E
- Opened: 7 December 2000
- Casino type: Land-based
- Owner: SkyCity Entertainment Group
- Website: skycityqueenstown.co.nz

SkyCity Queenstown is a casino located in Queenstown, New Zealand, that opened in December 2000. It is one of six casinos operating in New Zealand. It is owned by SkyCity Entertainment Group.

== History ==
The casino opened on December 7, 2000, the fourth casino to open in New Zealand. The casino has eight gaming tables, an additional four gaming tables in the VIP room, and 86 gaming machines. The casino is authorized to offer a maximum of 339 gaming machines and 23 tables.

In 2012, SkyCity bought Skyline Enterprises' 40% stake in the casino, and became the sole owner of the casino, and as part of the deal, it sold its 41% shares in the Christchurch Casino to Skyline.

The casino's license currently runs until December 2025.

=== SkyCity Wharf Casino ===
In June 2013, SkyCity acquired Otago Casinos Limited, a subsidiary of Singapore's Lasseters International Holdings Ltd, which had held the Wharf Casino operating license. It was rebranded as SkyCity Wharf Casino. The casino's license runs until September 2024. The casino is authorized to operate six gaming tables and 74 gaming machines. It is currently closed and is not operational, though its license persists. Under New Zealand law, casinos are not able to relocate. SkyCity Wharf Casino was unable to successfully renegotiate its lease of the building it operated out of. As it cannot relocate, it had to close its doors.

== Community ==
To date, SkyCity Queenstown Casino Community Trust has donated more than NZ$1.92 million in grants to community groups and charities.

SkyCity Queenstown is also a major sponsor or co-sponsor of local events, such as the SkyCity Gibbston Wine and Food Festival, the American Express Queenstown Winter Festival, and Winter Pride Queenstown. Since May 2016, it has sponsored the local ice hockey team, the SkyCity Southern Stampede.

== See also ==
- Gambling in New Zealand
