= Louis Boldini =

Italian architect in New Zealand and Australia

Louis Boldini (born Luigi Boldini; 9 April 1832 – 12 October 1908) was an Italian-born architect who made considerable contributions to the architecture of Dunedin, New Zealand and Victoria, Australia.

For many years, little was known of Boldini's life, with New Zealand printed references (such as Southern People: A dictionary of Otago-Southland biography) lamenting "It is remarkable that so little is known about Boldini [...] It would be good to know more about this man who left a distinctively continental stamp of the predominantly British architecture of old Dunedin."

== Early life ==
Born Luigi Boldini in Ferrara, Italy, Boldini was the eldest son of prominent local artist Antonio Boldini and Benvenuta (née Caleffi). During his childhood, his family moved in with his grandparents, the Ferdonzis. Luigi Ferdonzi, Antonio's stepfather, was a civil engineer and architect, triggering Luigi's interest in architecture.

A legacy from a wealthy uncle in 1846 allowed the Boldini children the opportunity to study for careers in the arts and sciences. Luigi was able to study civil engineering in Rome and Paris, brothers Giuseppe and Giovanni became artists, and a further brother, Gaetono, became a railway engineer.

Following his graduation, Luigi became a city engineer in Ferrara and in 1861 he married Adelina Borelli. Adelina died young, and after her death in the mid 1870s Boldini, together with his two young sons migrated to New Zealand, possibly advised to do so for his health, and settled in the wealthy southern city of Dunedin.

== New Zealand and Australia ==
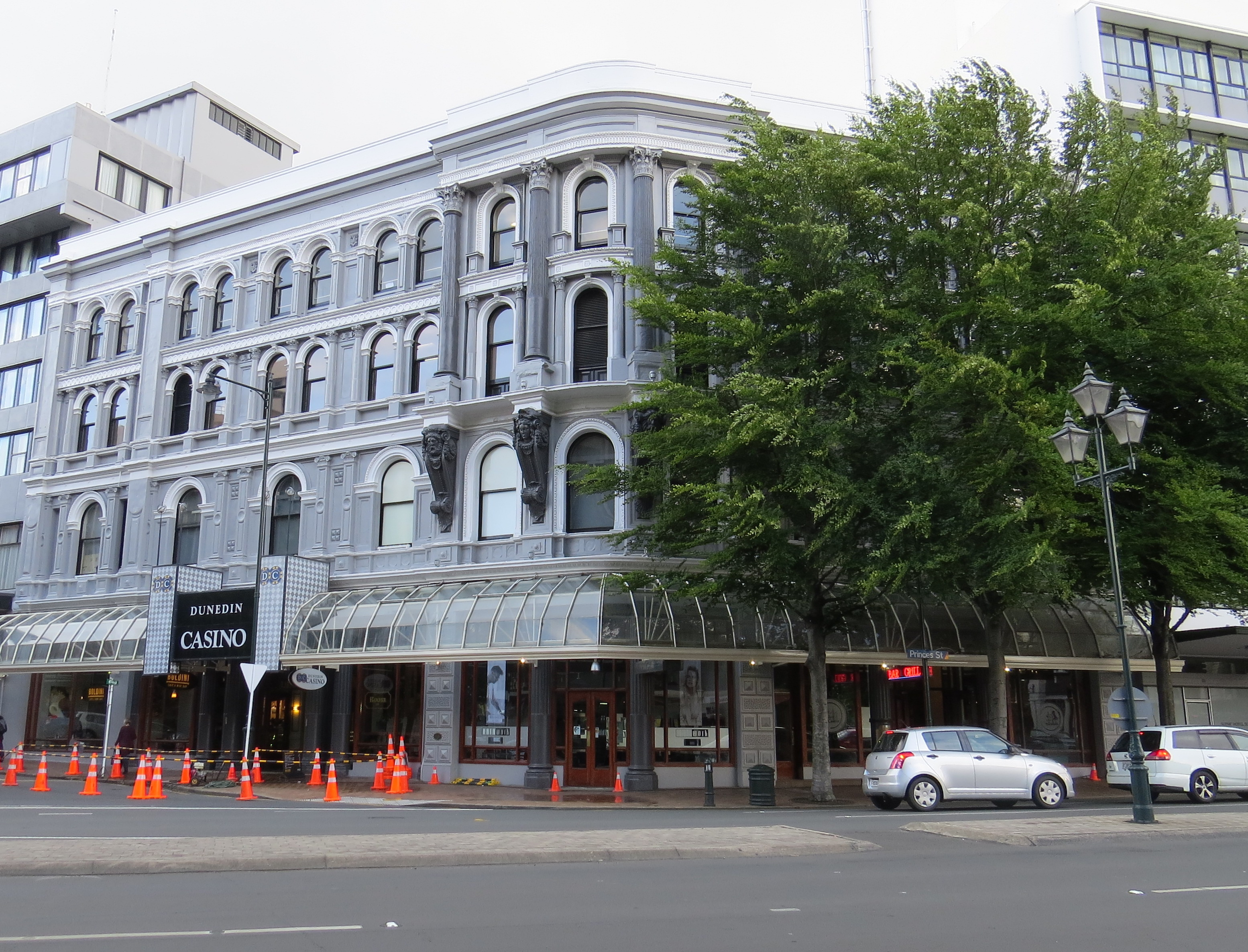
Boldini's Grand Hotel, Dunedin, now Dunedin Casino

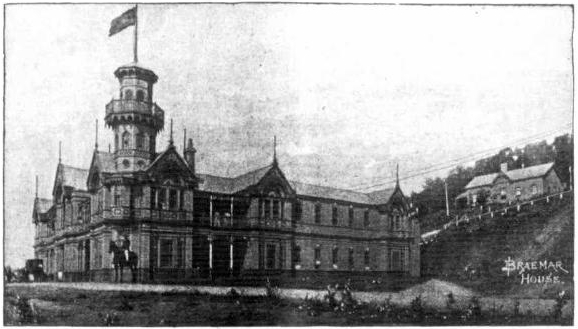
Boldini's Braemar House, Victoria, as it appeared in 1919

1870s Dunedin was still prosperous as the result of a major gold rush in the early 1860s, and as a result grand buildings were in demand. The city was dominated largely by architects of British birth or descent (notably Robert Lawson and Francis Petre), and Boldini – who anglicised his first name to Louis – provided a continental touch to the city's architecture.

Boldini was to live in Dunedin for thirteen years, and designed many of the city's most prominent structures, including the city's second synagogue, built in 1880; major commercial buildings in the heart of the city's CBD; and the South Dunedin Town Hall. Arguably his greatest design in the city was for the 1883 Grand Hotel (now the heritage-listed Southern Cross Hotel and Dunedin Casino), at the corner of Princes Street and High Street in the city's Exchange precinct. The Boldini Cafe and Wine Bar in the hotel is named in the architect's honour.

In 1888, with New Zealand suffering from an economic depression which stifled building growth, Boldini migrated to Australia, where he was to spend the remainder of his life. He had been invited to design a summerhouse in Victoria for former Wellington businessman Charles William Chapman. Chapman proved to be a useful contact, his influence leading to a major contract for a resort building, Braemar House (now the main building of Braemar College) at Mount Macedon built in 1889–90.

Boldini lived in Melbourne and Daylesford before moving to Maldon around 1896. Here, he was in charge of redesigns for the town's hospital, as well as building the town's Scots' Church, Phoenix commercial buildings, and Maldon Hotel, and was also involved in the local social life, being made life governor of the Maldon Athenaeum Society. He died in Maldon in 1908 and was buried in the town's cemetery.
