= Lotto New Zealand =

National lottery operator of New Zealand

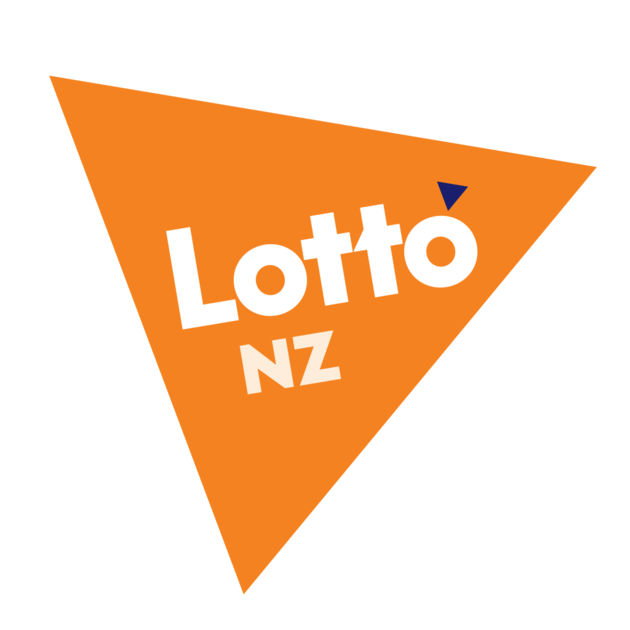

Agency overview
- Formed: 1987
- Headquarters: Auckland, New Zealand
- Minister responsible: Brooke van Velden, Minister of Internal Affairs
- Agency executives: Tony Balfour, Chair; Jason Delamore, CEO
- Website: www.mylotto.co.nz

The New Zealand Lotteries Commission, trading as Lotto New Zealand since 2013, is a Crown entity that operates nationwide lotteries in New Zealand. It was established in 1987 and operates under the Gambling Act 2003. Its oldest and most popular game is Lotto, which boasts a top prize pool of NZ$1 million. Other games include the four-draws-daily Keno, the daily Bullseye, and a variety of scratchcards and online games known as Instant Kiwi. Instant Kiwi may only be played by persons 18 years of age or older, under the Gambling Act 2003. Powerball and Lotto Strike are optional extras with every Lotto ticket. Powerball is a jackpotting game, with a maximum jackpot of $60 million, after which a Must Be Won draw must be called.

Profits from the publicly regulated lotteries are passed to the New Zealand Lottery Grants Board to distribute as funding for recreation, arts, community projects and sports. Since its creation, Lotto NZ has contributed more than $5.9 billion to the Lottery Grants Board. The New Zealand Film Commission, Creative New Zealand, and Sport New Zealand are major recipients of lottery funding.

== History ==
The New Zealand Cabinet approved the creation of Lotto in February 1986, the necessary legislation passing through Parliament in April that year with a 47–20 vote. The New Zealand Lotteries Commission was established in June 1987 and the existing Golden Kiwi lottery came under its authority. Since 2013 the commission has been trading as Lotto New Zealand.

External videos
- Lotto First Draw, 1 August 1987 via NZ on Screen

The first Lotto draw, with a top prize of $359,808, was held on 1 August 1987. The range of games has expanded, with a number of new ones being introduced, though some later ceased. Instant Kiwi scratchcards were introduced in 1989 (replacing Golden Kiwi), Lotto Strike in 1993, Keno in 1994, Powerball in 2001, Big Wednesday in 2005, Bullseye in 2009, Play 3 in 2014 and Instant Play in 2017. Big Wednesday ceased in 2015 and Play 3 in 2019.

Lotto has been worked into two past game shows, "TeleBingo" and "Risk". There were "Extra Draws" on a few occasions in 1998.

In April 2013 the Advertising Standards Authority considered a complaint about a Lotto advertisement featuring a dog stealing his owner's Lotto ticket because he got a cat. It dismissed the complaint.

== Current games ==
All monetary values are in New Zealand dollars.

=== Lotto ===
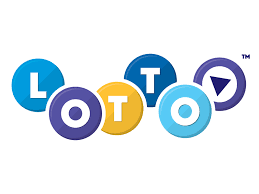

Lotto, including Powerball and Strike, is the most purchased of the games, accounting for $1,169 million or 84.4% of Lotto NZ's income. Originally a weekly game, the first tickets went on sale on 22 July 1987 and the first draw took place on 1 August 1987. It has a televised draw on TVNZ 1 at approximately 8pm every Saturday night and, since 2015, 8:20pm every Wednesday. The draw aired on TVNZ 2 from inception in August 1987 until July 2015 when it moved to TVNZ 1. If TVNZ 1 covers special events on various occasions (e.g. New Zealand general elections, Olympic Games etc), the draw will air on TVNZ 2. The televised draw is currently hosted by Sonia Gray and Jordan Vandermade.

The Lotto Rules 2000 codifies the rules for Lotto and its related games.

==== Main game ====
Lotto odds and prizes
Division	Matching numbers	Odds per line	Average Prize
1	6 numbers	1 in 3,838,380	Over $350,000
2	5 numbers and bonus ball	1 in 639,730	$19,995
3	5 numbers	1 in 19,386	$601
4	4 numbers and bonus ball	1 in 7,754	$55
5	4 numbers	1 in 485	$30
6	3 numbers and bonus ball	1 in 363	$22
7	3 numbers	1 in 35	4 bonus lines (fixed prize)

In the main game of Lotto, six balls and one bonus ball are drawn from a Smartplay Halogen II machine containing 40 balls numbered 1 to 40. To win First Division (the top prize), one has to simply mark off all six numbers on the same line.

Players can buy Lotto tickets by selecting their own numbers using a coupon, or they can have the machine randomly generate their numbers by purchasing a Lotto Dip. Tickets cost $0.70 per line,^{:8} with a minimum of four lines if playing with a coupon. The least expensive Lotto Dip is the Basic Lucky Dip, which costs $5.60 for eight lines.

===== Changes since introduction =====
- Originally, Lotto tickets cost $0.50 per line. This was increased to $0.60 in August 2004, and to $0.70 in April 2017.
- In November 2002, some changes were made, all of which (except for the new-look logo and a separate division for four numbers plus the bonus) were withdrawn in August 2004. They were:
  - A Guaranteed Millionaire was drawn every week from the First Division winners (see below). This meant that Jackpots and Superdraws were out of the question for 21 months.
  - A second bonus ball was drawn.

===== Extra draws =====
In 1998, there were several Extra Draws during the year. They worked as follows:

- Every Lotto ticket purchased for the draw entered the Extra Draw for no extra charge.
- All the numbers had to match for a share of $1,000,000 cash.
- Lotto Strike and the bonus ball is not included as well as no other prize divisions.
  - The amount was $1,500,000 on one occasion, which came from an unclaimed ticket sold in Blenheim in October 1997 (this was known as the Blenheim Bonus.)

===== Guaranteed millionaires =====
Between November 2002 and August 2004, a millionaire was drawn every week from all the Division One winners. Sometimes, more than one millionaire was drawn.

The rest of the Division One prizes were done as follows:

- If there were between one and four left, they won $250,000 each.
- If there were between five and nine left, they won $150,000 each.
- If there were between 10 and 19 left, they won $100,000 each.
- If there were 20 or more left, they shared $300,000 between them.

However, if there was only one Division One winner to begin with, they automatically won the million, and if nobody matched all six numbers, which only happened once, the millionaire was selected from Division Two.

==== Lotto Strike ====
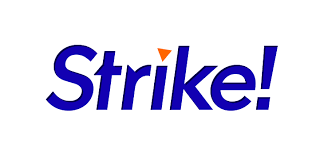

Introduced 3 April 1993.

A Lotto player may, at a cost of $1, add to their ticket four Lotto Strike numbers. The objective is to match these numbers, in exact order, with the first four numbers of the Lotto draw.

The current minimum jackpot for the "Strike 4" prize is $200,000, and increases by that amount until won, or until the jackpot reaches $1,500,000 or the tenth draw without a winner.

Division	Requirements	Odds	Average Prize
Strike 4	Four Lotto Strike numbers matching the exact order of the first four Lotto numbers drawn	1 in 2,193,360	Over $300,000
Strike 3	Three Lotto Strike numbers match the exact order of any three of the first four Lotto numbers drawn	1 in 15,232	$668
Strike 2	Two Lotto Strike numbers match the exact order of any two of the first four Lotto numbers drawn	1 in 274	$67
Strike 1	One Lotto Strike number matches one of the first four Lotto numbers drawn	1 in 11	1 bonus line (fixed prize)

==== Powerball ====
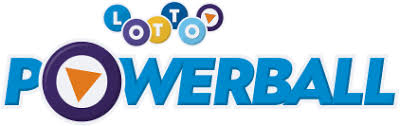

Lotto Powerball odds and prizes
Division	Matching numbers	Odds per line	Average prize (incl. Lotto winnings)
1	Lotto Division 1 and Powerball	1 in 53,737,320	Over $17.2 million
2	Lotto Division 2 and Powerball	1 in 8,956,220	$45,056
3	Lotto Division 3 and Powerball	1 in 271,401	$1,406
4	Lotto Division 4 and Powerball	1 in 108,560	$131
5	Lotto Division 5 and Powerball	1 in 6,785	$70
6	Lotto Division 6 and Powerball	1 in 5,089	$50
7	Lotto Division 7 and Powerball	1 in 493	$20 + 4 bonus lines (fixed prize)
8	Powerball Division 8	1 in 657	$12

Introduced February 2001.

A line may be "enhanced" by the purchase of a Powerball number. If Powerball is played, a minimum of four Powerball numbers must be purchased per ticket, at the cost of $0.80 per line. The Powerball number is a number between 1 and 14, drawn from a separate machine from the main Lotto draw. If the winning Powerball number is on the same line as a winning line of Lotto, the ticket holder wins a share of the Powerball prize pool in addition to the prize won from the main Lotto draw.

To win first division Powerball, the winner must first win Lotto first division, and have the winning Powerball number on the same line. The prize for first division is very large: a minimum of $5 million, but with the chances of winning one-tenth of the odds of winning an equivalent prize in the main draw. Since September 2026 Powerball First Division can jackpot to a maximum of $60 million. Once the limit is met or passed, a "Must Be Won" draw must be held in which, if First Division is not won, the First Division jackpot must be split amongst the winners of the next highest division for which there are winners.

When introduced, the Powerball number was originally drawn from eight numbers, and the minimum prize was $1 million. The maximum jackpot, which initially was $15 million, was gradually raised to $30 million. In October 2007, Powerball was changed to ten numbers and the minimum prize was changed to $3 million. On 3 October 2010, the price per line was raised from $0.50 to $0.60, to cover the cost of the rise in GST from 12.5% to 15%, and to increase the minimum prize to $4 million. In October 2015, Division 7 was introduced and the maximum jackpot increased from $30 million to $40 million. In April 2017, the price per line changed from $0.60 to $0.80 and the maximum jackpot increased from $40 million to $50 million.

==== Draw machines ====
Starting from the 30 May 2018 draw, Lotto, Strike and Powerball are drawn using Smartplay Halogen II machines. Until the 26 May 2018 draw, a Ryo Catteau Stresa draw machine was used for Lotto and Strike, while Powerball was drawn from with one of two Ryo Catteau Mimosa machines.

The machines have been known to fail to draw numbers on-air on several occasions, requiring the numbers to be redrawn off-air under auditor scrutiny. These include:

- 25 October 2014: The Powerball machine failed to draw a winning number on-air. The audited off-air draw resulted in 4 drawn as the winning number.
- 15 July 2017: The Powerball machine initially captured number 6 but it was knocked out of the tube during the presentation. The draw was aborted, and the audited off-air draw resulted in 1 drawn as the winning number.

In the event the draw machines cannot be used, the Lotto draw can be conducted using a backup random number generator at Lotto NZ's headquarters. This has occurred on two occasions: the first was in October 2019 when the New Zealand International Convention Centre fire forced the TVNZ studios to be evacuated, and the second was during the COVID-19 pandemic Level 4 lockdown in March–April 2020, and August—September 2021.

=== Keno ===
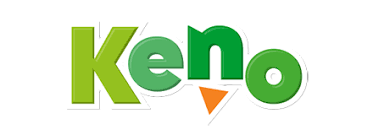

Following the format of the popular bingo hall game, Keno draws are made daily at 10am, 1pm, 3pm and 6pm. Tickets cost between $1 and $100 per line. The top prize for matching 10 numbers from 10 is $250,000 for a $1 wager, with a maximum prize of $1 million available. Keno Multiplier was added in February 2019.

=== Bullseye ===
Lotto Bullseye odds and prizes
Division	Requirements	Odds per line	Average Prize
1	Bullseye number	1 in 1,000,000	$180,000
2	Number 1 to 5 either side of Bullseye number	1 in 100,000	$10,000
3	Number 6 to 50 either side of Bullseye number	1 in 11,111	$500
4	Number 51 to 500 either side of Bullseye number	1 in 1,111	$100
5	Number 501 to 5000 either side of Bullseye number	1 in 111	$25
6	Number 5001 to 50000 either side of Bullseye number	1 in 11	$2 bonus ticket

Bullseye is a daily lottery game, launched on 19 October 2009. The winning number is drawn at 6pm and results are available online and in-store at 6:10pm.

One selects a six-digit number between 000000 and 999999, or gets the Lotto terminal to randomly select a number, and the aim is to get as close as possible to the Bullseye number. Tickets are $2 each number for one day, and $10 for one number for seven days. If one matches the Bullseye number exactly, they win first division and the top prize of a minimum $100,000. The first division jackpot has a maximum threshold of $400,000. If this threshold is reached, the next game will be a "must be won" draw; if no one wins the first division, the jackpot will go to the winners in the next highest division. Lesser prizes are won if one's number is up to 50,000 either side of the Bullseye, with prizes increasing in value as one's number gets closer to the Bullseye number. For the purposes of winning, the numbers are viewed as circular, with 999999 followed by 000000 (e.g. if the winning number was 975555, the winning range would be 925555 to 025555).

=== Instant Kiwi ===
Instant Kiwi is Lotto NZ's series of scratchcards and online games. Introduced in 1989 to replace the Golden Kiwi, Instant Kiwi has evolved over 21 years to its current format. It is the only Lotto NZ game with a purchase age restriction and minor prize claim age restriction – it is illegal to sell Instant Kiwi tickets to those under 18 years of age.

There are five pricing levels, with the higher-priced levels having larger prizes. The price-to-prize structure is same across all games.

- $1 tickets – maximum prize $10,000
- $2 tickets – maximum prize $20,000
- $3 tickets – maximum prize $40,000 or $50,000
- $5 tickets – maximum prize $75,000 or $100,000
- $10 tickets – maximum prize $250,000

From 2015 to 2017, Instant Kiwi introduced a 2nd Chance draw where players could win $1,000 cash with non-winning Instant Kiwi tickets.

Instant Kiwi Online was introduced on MyLotto.co.nz on Monday 4 December 2017 as Instant Play. All games cost from $0.50 to $5.00 with top prizes ranging from $4,000 to $100,000. Players can either try or purchase a game for Instant Kiwi Online.

In May 2019, Instant Play changed its name to Instant Kiwi Online to easily distinguish it between the online games and scratchcards.

== Retired games ==
=== Winning Wheel ===
Introduced August 2004.

Every Lotto ticket had a 16-digit Winning Wheel number (e.g. 123-45678901-20XX) which was the same as the ticket's serial number, except that the two digit checksum was replaced with XX for security reasons. Every draw, a serial number was drawn at random. The winner was awarded an all expenses paid trip to the studio in Wellington and, later, Auckland where they appeared on the show and spun the eponymous wheel to determine their prize.

The two-metre diameter wheel had 30 segments, each segment carrying either a cash prize ranging from $100,000 to $1 million, or non-cash prizes such as cars, shopping sprees and a $500,000 house and land package.

If someone did not wish to appear on the Winning Wheel, they might nominate a person to spin the wheel on their behalf, or they might take the minimum guaranteed prize of $25,000.

Entry into the draw for the Winning Wheel was automatic for all Lotto and Lotto Powerball tickets. Lotto Strike tickets were excluded, as they had a serial number ending in 12XX, not 20XX.

The Winning Wheel ended on 4 July 2015.

=== TeleBingo ===
TeleBingo ran from 24 July 1996 until 27 June 2001. There were two components, a lottery and a game show. The original timeslot was on TVNZ 1 at 8pm on a Wednesday, but later in its run, it was moved to the later timeslot of 9.30pm. In late 1999, TeleBingo was also repeated at around 3.30pm and, later, 4pm the next day. The hosts were Simon Barnett, who was later replaced by Grant Walker, and Ingrid Mole.

==== Lottery ====
Between 34 and 75 numbers were drawn from 75. Viewers at home had to match the numbers on-screen with numbers on a mini bingo board. These could be purchased at $2 each for a minimum of two tickets. There were three divisions:

- Four Corners: If you got each of the three corner numbers (the other was just a tick) before 27 numbers had been called, you won Four Corners.
- Cross: If you got the eight numbers that made a diagonal cross (plus the top-left corner tick) before 34 numbers had been called, you won Cross.
- Bingo. The big one – they keep drawing numbers until a Bingo winner had been found amongst all tickets for that draw. If there was one before 34 numbers had been called, they kept going until 34 numbers were called. The record was 37 Bingo winners.

If there were no winners in a division, the respective prize pool was carried over to the next division.

==== Game show ====
Three contestants appeared on the show. They started with $125 and a corner square, they earned $25 and another corner square for every question right and lost $25 (but not their corner square) for every question wrong. At the Cross round, they were given two squares as a head-start towards Cross. After Cross was earned, random squares were given with every correct answer until either a viewer or a contestant got Bingo. There were two possible outcomes as to the end:

- If a contestant got Bingo first, they kept going until a viewer got Bingo, and then any contestants who got Bingo would come away with double their final total.
- If a viewer got Bingo first, it went to "Run For Your Money", in which the contestants had 60 seconds to get Bingo, and anyone who got it would come away with double their final total.

The contestant with the most money then went to a memory board, where he or she had to reveal two matching squares to get a certain prize, and then he or she had the option of taking away the prizes or risking them for more the next week.

=== Risk ===
Risk ran from 25 July 2001 until 13 February 2002. Draw numbers started from where TeleBingo numbers left off. The show was on TVNZ 1 in a more consistent time slot, at 7.30pm on a Wednesday. The show was hosted by Jon Bridges.

==== Lottery ====
Twenty-five numbers from 1 to 90 were drawn. The objective was to match one of the following:

- The 12 numbers in Game 'R'
- The 9 numbers in Game 'S'
- The 6 numbers in Game 'K'
- The 3 numbers in Game 'I'

All panels except Game 'R' had one or more $ signs which could be marked off immediately. A number could appear on two panels on a single ticket.

The game-board looked like this:

X X X     $    
X X        
X X X X    
X X     X    
X X   X    

  X X X X   $  
X X X    
  X $     $      
      X X X    
X X X X   $

Game 'R' jackpotted if not won.

There was a team colour printed on each ticket. If that team won, then all tickets bearing that colour went into a draw for a cash prize.

==== Game show ====
Three teams of two contestants (namely Red, Yellow and Purple) were spotted $500 ($300 in the first few episodes) to begin the game with. Correct answers were worth $50, and incorrect answers were penalized by that amount. After two rounds, the team in third place was eliminated, and at the end of the last round, only one team prevailed.

=== Big Wednesday ===
Big Wednesday odds and prizes
Division	Matching numbers	Odds per Line	Average Prize
1	6 numbers and coin toss	1 in 31,781,400	$4,000,000 (incl. non-cash prizes) Minimum
2	6 numbers (incorrect coin toss)	1 in 31,781,400	$87,000
3	5 numbers	1 in 60,192	$1000
4	4 numbers	1 in 1,120	$20
5	3 numbers and coin toss	1 in 120	$12
6	3 numbers (incorrect coin toss)	1 in 120	$4 bonus ticket

The Big Wednesday draw was introduced in October 2005, and was televised on TVNZ 1 each Wednesday, at approximately 8:20 pm. Offering substantial non-cash prizes, such as luxury cars, atop a significant cash prize (minimum value of $3.5 million), it was marketed as an opportunity to win "the ultimate lifestyle". Lines were $1 each, with (like the main Lotto game) a minimum of four lines per ticket.

The mechanism of the draw was similar to Lotto, with players trying to correctly guess the six numbers drawn. However, there were 50 balls for Big Wednesday, not 40, and the game had the added feature of a "coin toss"; along with the numbers, players must predict heads or tails. A player matching all six numbers will only win the jackpot if they correctly guess the outcome of the coin toss. The odds on winning the jackpot were 1 in 31,781,400. However, if the player did not match the coin toss, they would win Second Division, which consisted of a smaller jackpotting cash prize.

As with Lotto, players could also have their numbers selected for them by the machine by purchasing a Big Wednesday "Dip". The Basic Big Wednesday Dip cost $6.00. Players could opt to select either heads, tails or random heads/tails. A popular option was a Big Wednesday Dip with both heads and tails, which produced two tickets with the same numbers, one ticket with "heads" on all line and one ticket with "tails" on all lines, which ensured that if the player matched all the numbers, they would win both First and Second Division.

Effective from the draw on 14 September 2011, the number of balls was increased from 45 to 50, lengthening the Division 1 (and 2) odds to 1 in 31,781,400. The Division 5 prize (for three correct numbers, previously winning a Lucky Dip entry) was split into new Division 5 for a matched coin toss, now winning a cash prize, and Division 6 for an incorrect coin toss prediction, winning a four-line Lucky Dip entry.

Big Wednesday ended on 30 September 2015, with a Must Be Won draw.

==== Jackpot ====
The original format of Big Wednesday saw the first draw's jackpot consist of $2 million cash and two luxury cars. If not won, non-cash prizes were added to the jackpot for the next four weeks, after which the cash component then increased until the jackpot reached a combined cash value of $30 million. At this point, a "Must Be Won" draw would be held, with the jackpot divided amongst lower division winners if Division 1 was not won.

Some of the "non-cash" prizes – namely, the travel and bach components – were paid as cash (via cheque or direct credit); the other prizes could be paid as cash at Lotto NZ's discretion, including:

- if the winner did not fulfill certain conditions for receiving a prize in kind (for example, being under the age of 18, or not being a permanent New Zealand resident), or
- where there was more than one winner of the jackpot prize in a single draw (normally Division 1, however it could also be divided amongst a lower division in a Must Be Won draw); the cash value of the non-cash prizes being divided equally amongst all winners.

Effective 14 September 2011, the jackpot prize was changed so all of the non-cash prizes are made available from the first draw in a jackpot sequence (although with some of the "non-cash" prizes reduced in value). The advertised "cash" component then increased with every jackpot draw until won (or the $30 million "Must Be Won" threshold is reached). The minimum jackpot prize consisted as follows:

- $2 million cash
- Two luxury cars (currently an Audi Q7 and Lamborghini Gallardo),
- a Visa Platinum credit card with $50,000 of credit,
- a $50,000 cash prize intended towards luxury travel,
- a Rayglass 2200 boat,
- a $675,000 cash prize intended towards a bach.

=== Play 3 ===
Game type	Requirements	Odds per play	Prize
Exact order	Match the number in the same order drawn	1 in 1,000	$500
Any order	Match the number in any order	1 in 333 (6-way), 1 in 167 (3-way)	$80 (6-way), $160 (3-way)
Pairs	Match the first, last or middle 2 of the digits	1 in 100	$17
Combo	Plays every exact combination	Same odds of winning as Any	$500

Introduced October 2014.

Play 3 was Lotto NZ's third daily game with the first draw on 6 October 2014. Draws took place daily at 6pm. On a coupon, players could choose a three-digit number between 000 and 999 and a play type, or they could have the computer choose their number and play type at random by marking the random number box on the coupon or purchasing a dip. Players could win larger prizes by playing a multi play type for $2, $3, or $6. Play 3 was discontinued on 2 March 2019, ticket sales ended on 17 February 2019.

== Online sales ==
On 26 May 2008 Lotto NZ launched MyLotto, an online sales channel providing an alternative to the traditional retail outlet for players of Lotto, Keno and Bullseye. Players must register to use the service, and add funds to their account via internet banking or credit card before purchasing tickets. There is a maximum spending limit of $150 a week or $500 a month; players can choose a lower spending limit if they wish, and can block themselves from participation in any of the games. MyLotto operates between 6.30 am and 11 pm Monday, Tuesday, Thursday, Friday and Sunday, and between 6.30 am and midnight on Wednesday and Saturday.

As with tickets purchased at retail outlets, players have the options of playing a Dip, selecting their own numbers and players can save their favourite numbers for future use. Additionally, players can choose a subscription to play weekly.

== Claim of prizes ==
Prizes can be claimed at any Lotto outlet or Lotto NZ's headquarters in Auckland by presenting and surrendering the ticket. Bonus tickets and cash prizes up to and including $1,000 are paid out in cash by the outlet.^{:50} For cash prizes over $1,000 and all non-cash prizes, the ticket holder must complete a prize claim form which is sent along with the ticket to Lotto NZ, who pays the prize by direct credit into the ticket holder's bank account.^{:51-52}

Prizes must be claimed within 12 months of the draw (or close of the game for Instant Kiwi), otherwise the prize is void and the unclaimed money goes back into the prize pool.^{:49}

== Records ==
Largest prize

- The largest prize won by a single ticket was $44,066,667, in the Powerball draw of 9 November 2016 (draw 1593). The winning ticket was sold at Dairy Flat Food Mart in Auckland. The prize was made up of $44,000,000 in Powerball and $66,667 in Lotto.

Most tickets sold

- The greatest number of tickets sold for a draw was for the aforementioned Powerball draw of 9 November 2016 (draw 1593).

Most winners

- The record for the most First Division winners in one draw was set on 19 September 2018 (draw 1787), when 40 people won First Division. Each winner received $25,000. The main contributing factor was the winning numbers were 3, 5, 7, 9, 11 and 13, with the bonus ball being 36. The number of winners in First Division saw them receiving less prize money than the winners of Second Division, the five winners of which won $27,431 each.

== See also ==
- Gambling in New Zealand
