= Gambling in New Zealand =

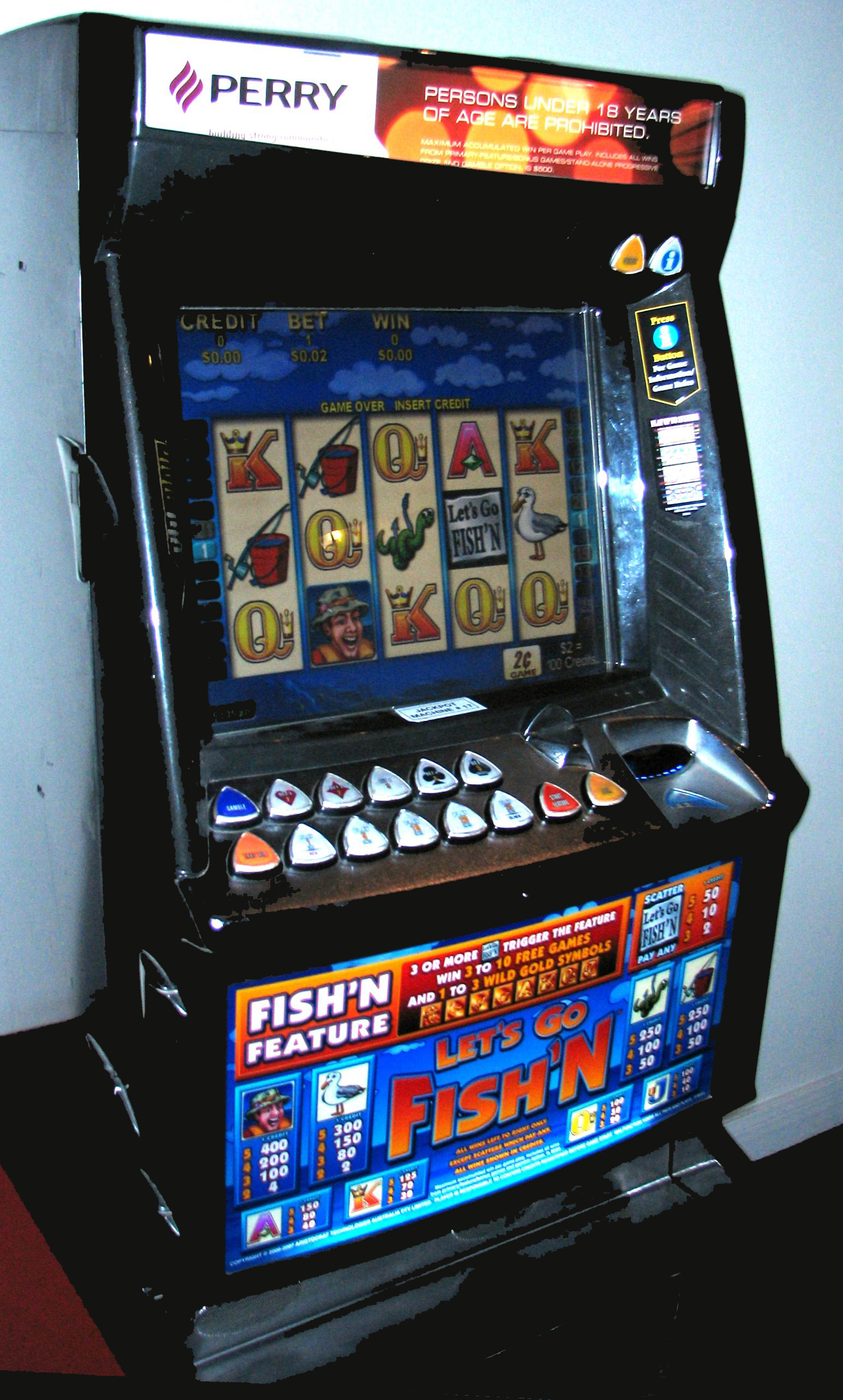
A pokie machine in a New Zealand pub.

Gambling in New Zealand is controlled by the Department of Internal Affairs. All public gambling is expected to return a portion of profits to the community. The largest proportion of the gambling industry is operated by state-owned institutions. Expenditure on gambling (losses experienced by players) was $NZ 2.034 billion in 2008 ($NZ 480 per capita), a tenfold increase over 1985 figures.

== Horse racing ==
Bookmaking was declared illegal in New Zealand in 1920. From then until the introduction of the Totalisator Agency Board (TAB) in 1951, betting on racing was only available on-course. In 2020, the Racing Industry Act replaced the Racing Act 2003, establishing Racing Industry Transition Agency (RITA) to oversee the transition of the industry. TAB New Zealand now operates as a commercial entity. Online and mobile betting platforms have grown, reflecting the global trend towards digital gambling. The industry also faces challenges such as competition from international bookmakers and concerns over problem gambling.

== Lotteries ==
The first "Art Union" was conducted in New Zealand by the Otago Art Society in December 1877. Both individuals and organizations subsequently used them as a way of raising funds. The first national lotteries were established in 1933. They were known as "Art Unions". Prizes were relatively small, and in the early Art Unions the prizes were quantities of alluvial gold. As an example, the "Golden Treasure" Art Union of 1935 had 200,000 tickets with a top prize of £2000 ranging down to an 11th prize of £20 plus 400 prizes of £2. The low returns tempted many people to (illegally) purchase tickets in overseas lotteries such as the Australian Tattersall's lottery. With Art Union sales declining, a review of lotteries was undertaken by the Second Labour Government in the late 1950s, and in 1961 the National Government introduced the Golden Kiwi lottery.

The New Zealand Lotteries Commission was established in 1987. Its original product, Lotto, has since been supplemented by Instant Kiwi scratch cards, daily Keno and a Lotto variant named Big Wednesday. Lotto tickets became available online in 2008.

The Totalizator Agency Board, commonly called the TAB, is a sports betting organisation run by the New Zealand Racing Board.

== "Pokies" ==
Introduced in 1987, slot machines, commonly known as "pokies", are operated by charitable foundations and are mostly placed in hotels and bars. Maximum jackpots are regulated. In the year ending 30 June 2008, turnover was $10.096 billion, of which $9.158 billion was returned as prizes (player losses were $938 million). These figures represent a 9% decrease from the peak year of 2004. Pokies accounted for 46.1% of gambling expenditure (losses) in 2008. The year to 30 June 2009 saw a further 5% fall in expenditure, to $889 million. There were 19,479 machines in 1,501 venues operated by 384 licensees, all of these figures being a decrease from 2008.

Since 1 July 2009, all machines must have Player Information Displays, which inform the gambler how long they have been playing, how much they have lost, and which encourage them to take breaks.

In May 2013, the Government announced it would allow casino SkyCity Auckland to install an additional 230 pokie machines and 40 new gambling tables, in exchange for a $402 million convention centre.

Online pokies, also commonly referred to as online slots, are digital adaptations of traditional slot machines that can be played via the internet. They have gained substantial popularity in the world of online gambling, providing players with convenient access to a diverse range of casino games.

== Casinos ==
There are six casinos operating in New Zealand, the first of which (Christchurch Casino) opened in 1994:

- Christchurch Casino
- Grand Casino Dunedin (also known as Dunedin Casino)
- SkyCity Auckland
- SkyCity Hamilton
- SkyCity Queenstown
- SkyCity Wharf Casino (currently not operational though its license persists)

== Online casinos ==
In July 2025, New Zealand was moving to legalize iGaming which would legalize online casinos in the country. Up to 15 platforms would be permitted.

On May 1, 2026, the Online Casino Gambling Act 2026 came into force, replacing the offshore gray market with a regulated domestic system. The Department of Internal Affairs will issue up to 15 licenses via a competitive auction, with the newly regulated market officially opening on December 1, 2026. By June 1, 2027, unlicensed operators will be strictly prohibited from serving New Zealand players, while licensed platforms will be subject to new mandatory consumer protections and advertising bans.

== See also ==
- Problem gambling
- Problem Gambling Foundation of New Zealand
