= SkyCity Auckland =

Entertainment complex and casino in Auckland, New Zealand

Coordinates: 36°50′56″S 174°45′42″E

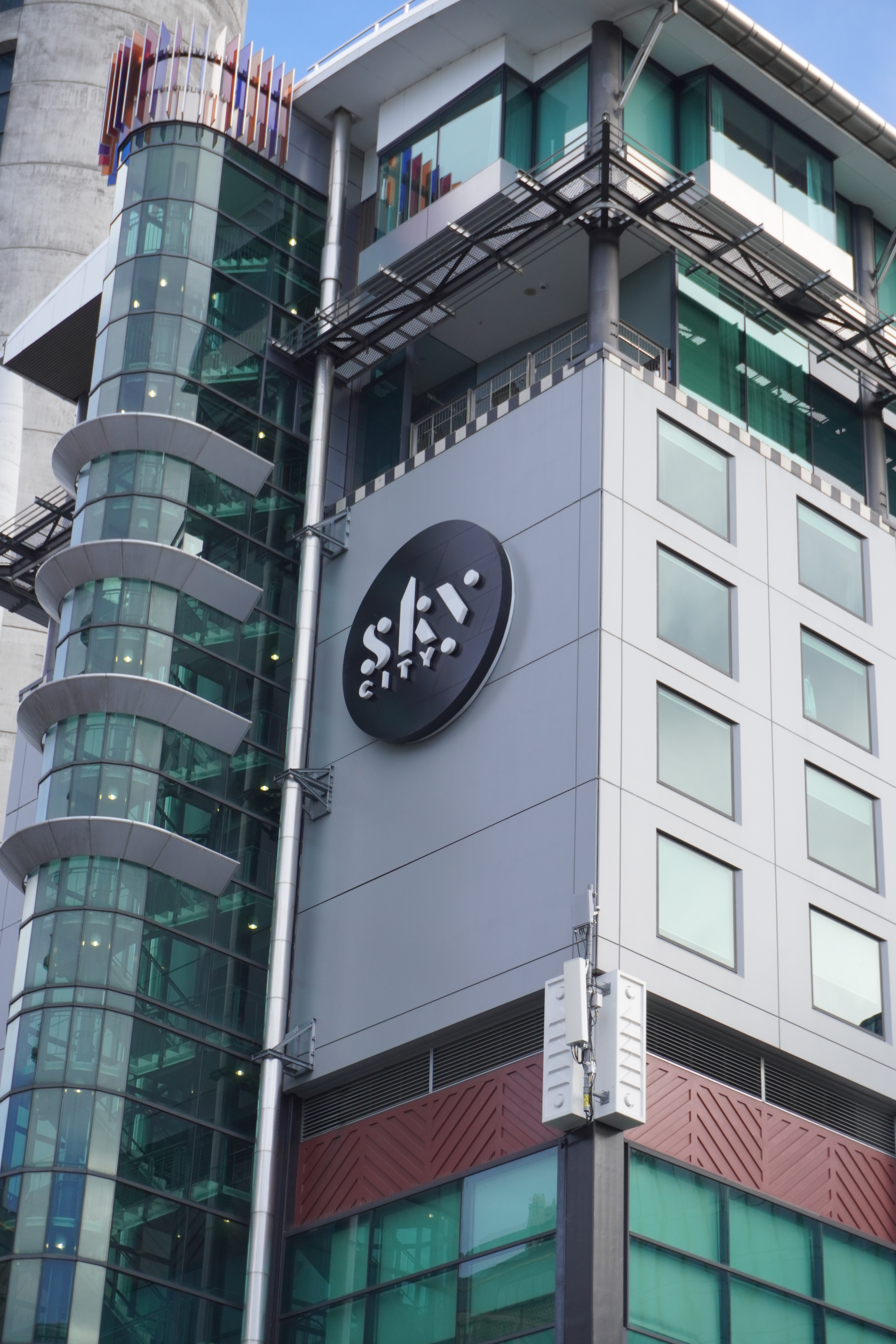
- Interactive map of Skycity Auckland
- Location: Auckland CBD, Auckland, New Zealand; Corner Victoria and Federal Streets
- Opened: 2 February 1996; 30 years ago
- Signature attractions: Sky Tower
- Casino type: Land
- Owner: Skycity Entertainment Group
- Renovated in: 2016
- Website: www.skycityauckland.co.nz

SkyCity Auckland is an entertainment complex and casino hotel in the central business district of Auckland, New Zealand, between Victoria and Federal Streets. Located at the base of the Sky Tower, it was the second casino in New Zealand, and is the only casino in Auckland.

== Facilities ==
The complex includes the Sky Tower, the Sky City Theatre with an auditorium with 700-seats, many bars and restaurants, and three hotels, with one scheduled to open in 2021. The casino was last refurbished in 2006, and has approximately 1,600 gambling machines, 100 gambling tables and rooms for VIP / high-stakes gamblers.

In September 2013, it was announced that Skycity Auckland had purchased a 21m motor yacht "Horizon II" for corporate entertainment.

In February 2018, Skycity Auckland opened New Zealand's first purpose-built e-sports broadcasting studio, located on Level 2 of the Sky Tower, formerly known as XO Bar.

== History ==
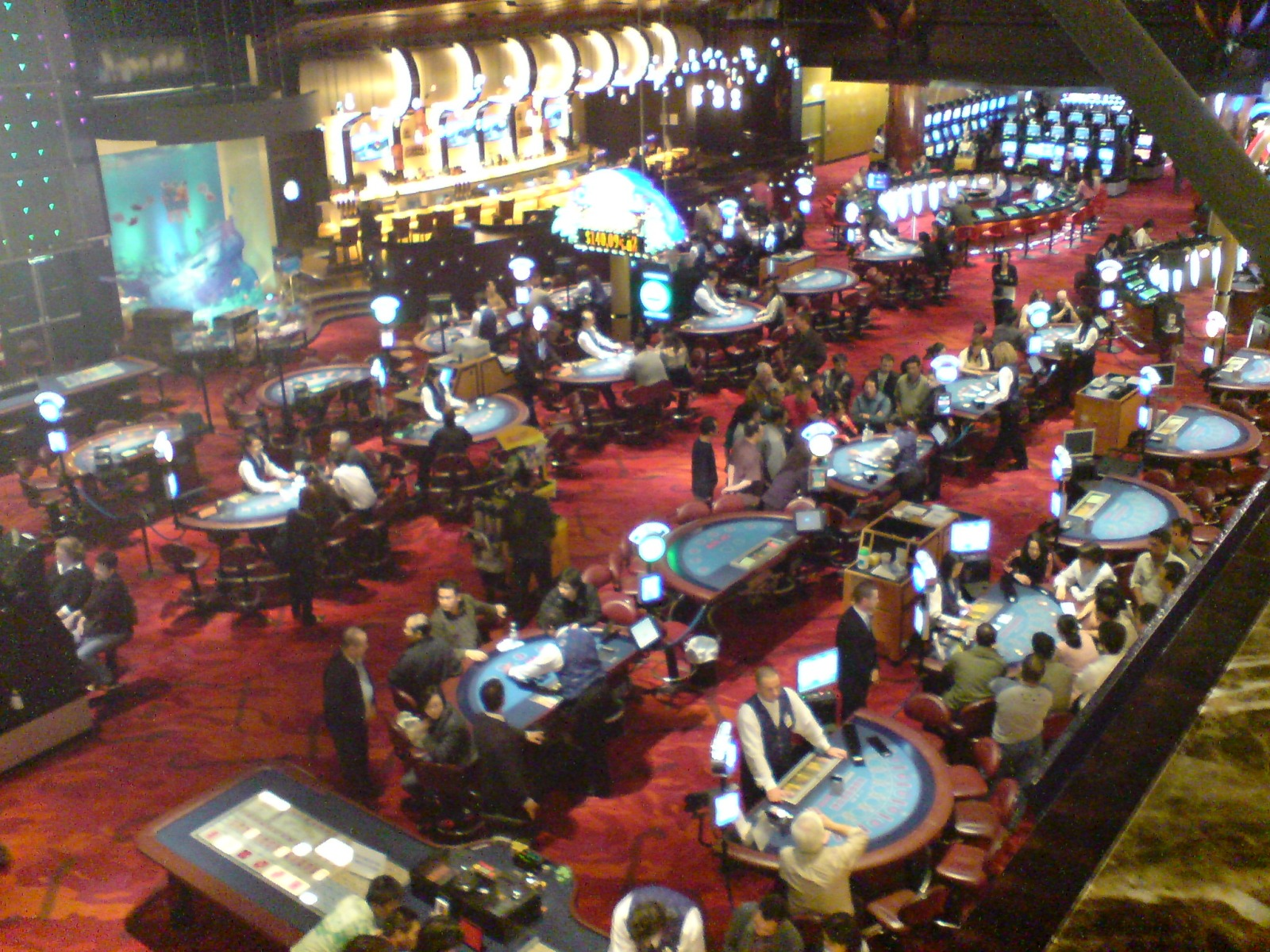
Inside the casino

The Sky Tower, convention centre and hotel were all built by Fletcher Construction and completed by 1997.

Skycity's casino was the second casino in the country. At the time of its construction, it was controversial, just like the Sky Tower itself. Unlike the city's icon towering above it, major figures like former Auckland Mayor Dick Hubbard have remained critical of the casino, though he acknowledged that the complex itself has been positive for the city. However, there is criticism from various sources that the casino creates problem gambling and does not ban problem gamblers proactively enough.

The casino provides almost 2000 jobs and has returned NZD $670 million in dividends to mainly Australian shareholders, from more than eight million visitors that have passed through, 15% from overseas. NZD $18.6 million was also paid to community organisations and trusts in the same time. 1.5% of the operating profit has to be paid out to charity according to law.

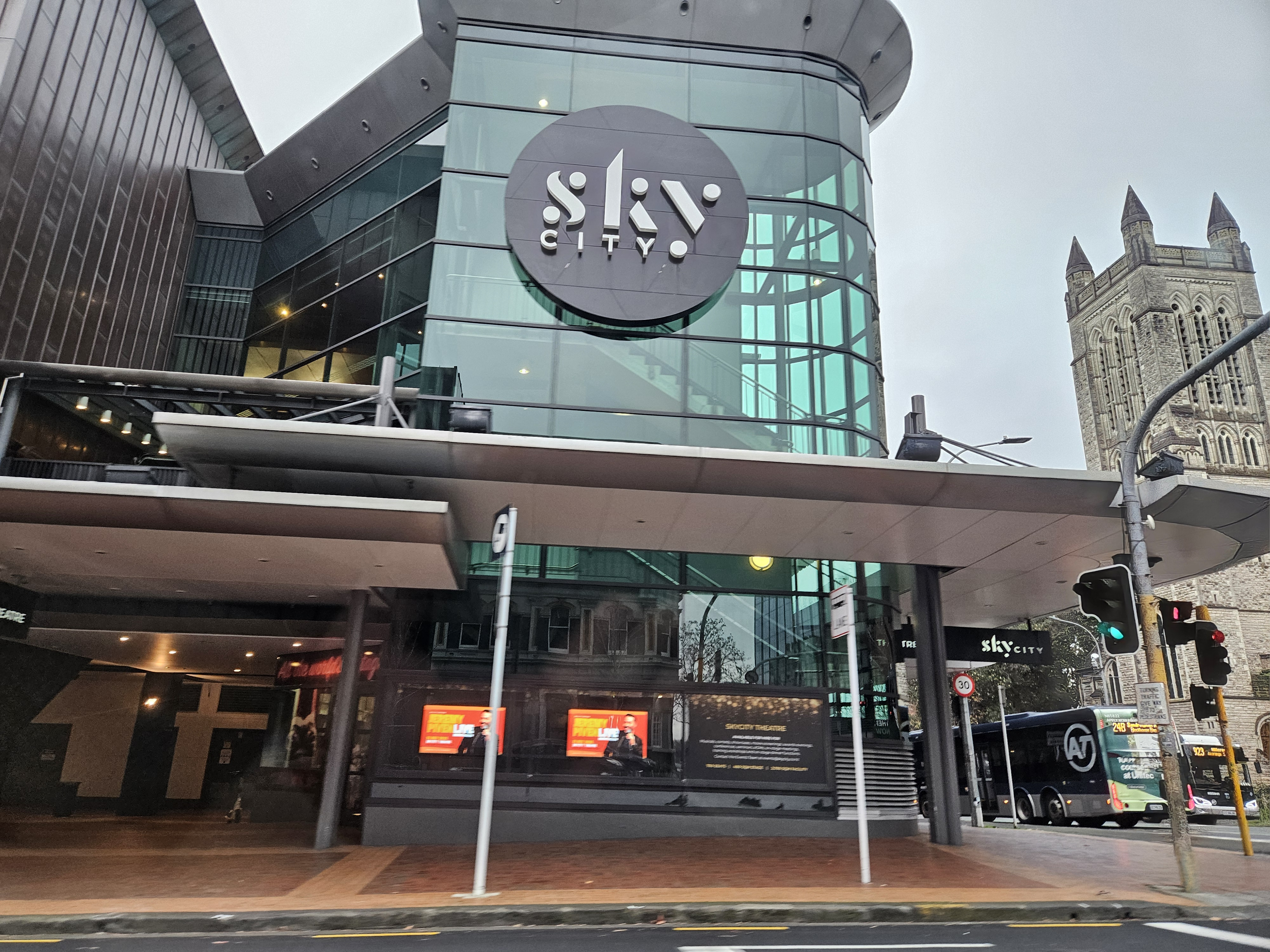
Entrance to the SkyCity Theatre

With profits at its parent, the Skycity Entertainment Group falling, it was announced in May 2007 that around 230 staff of SkyCity Auckland would be let go within the following 12–18 months, though it was thought likely to be mostly through turnover attrition, and would be focused on management staff.

On 11 May 2020, SkyCity announced that it would be slashing 700 jobs as a result of the economic effects of the COVID-19 pandemic in New Zealand. A month earlier, SkyCity had slashed 200 jobs.

On 9 May 2024, SkyCity Auckland agreed to close for five days after failing to stop a problem gambler from spending over a NZ$1 million in pokies.

== Hotels ==
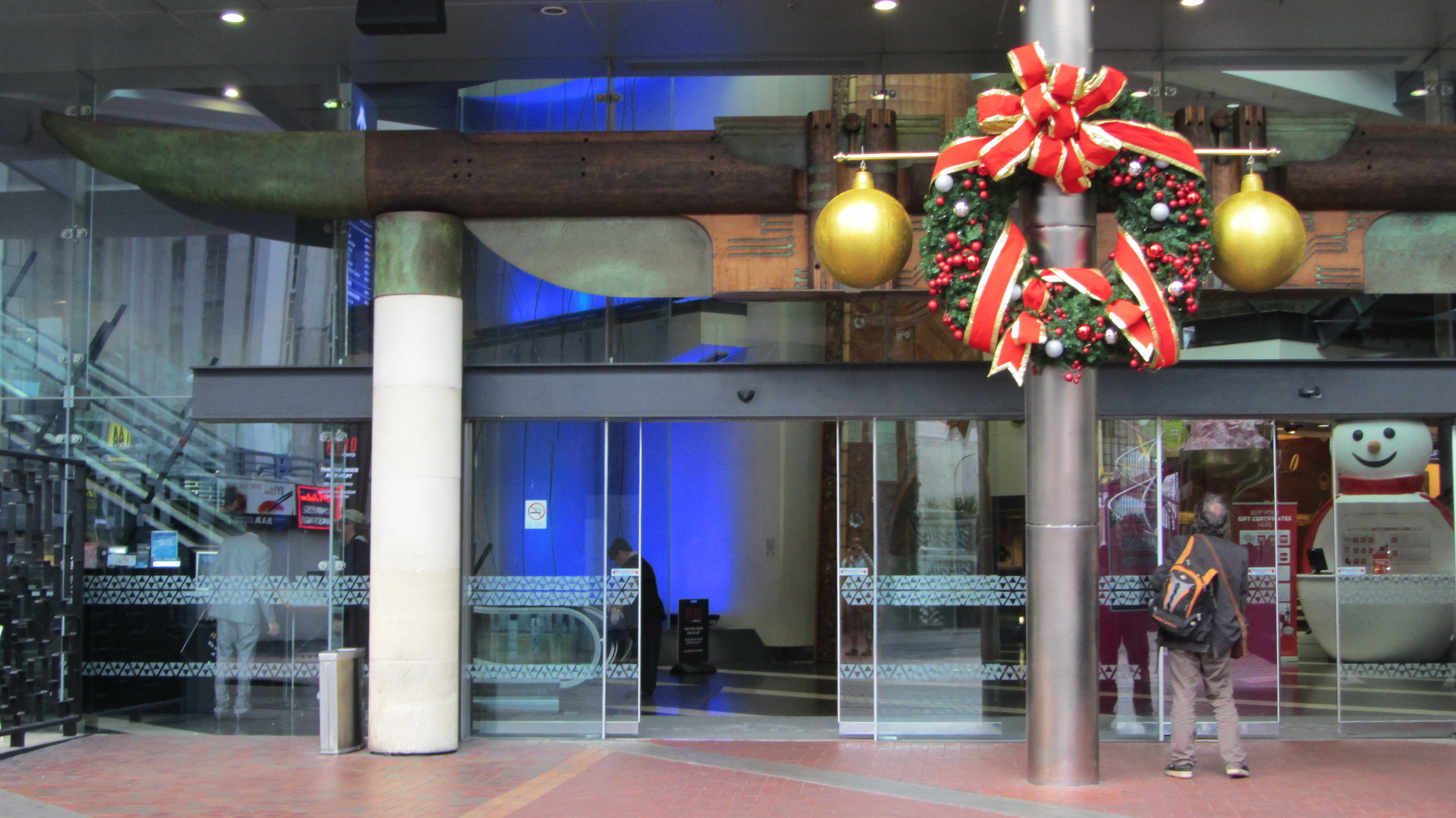
Entrance to the hotel around Christmastime

Skycity Hotel, Auckland is a four-star hotel and was opened on 2 February 1996. It is one of New Zealand's busiest hotels and is located inside the main Auckland complex and serves mainly families, business travellers and gamblers who play at the casino. It offers 323 rooms which were refurbished in 2013. Hotel guests may use all the facilities in the complex.

The Grand by Skycity is a luxury 5 star hotel which was officially opened by Prime Minister Helen Clark in April 2005 after costing $85 million to construct. It is not located inside the main complex but is located on Federal Street which is adjacent and is also connected by a skybridge.

== Events ==
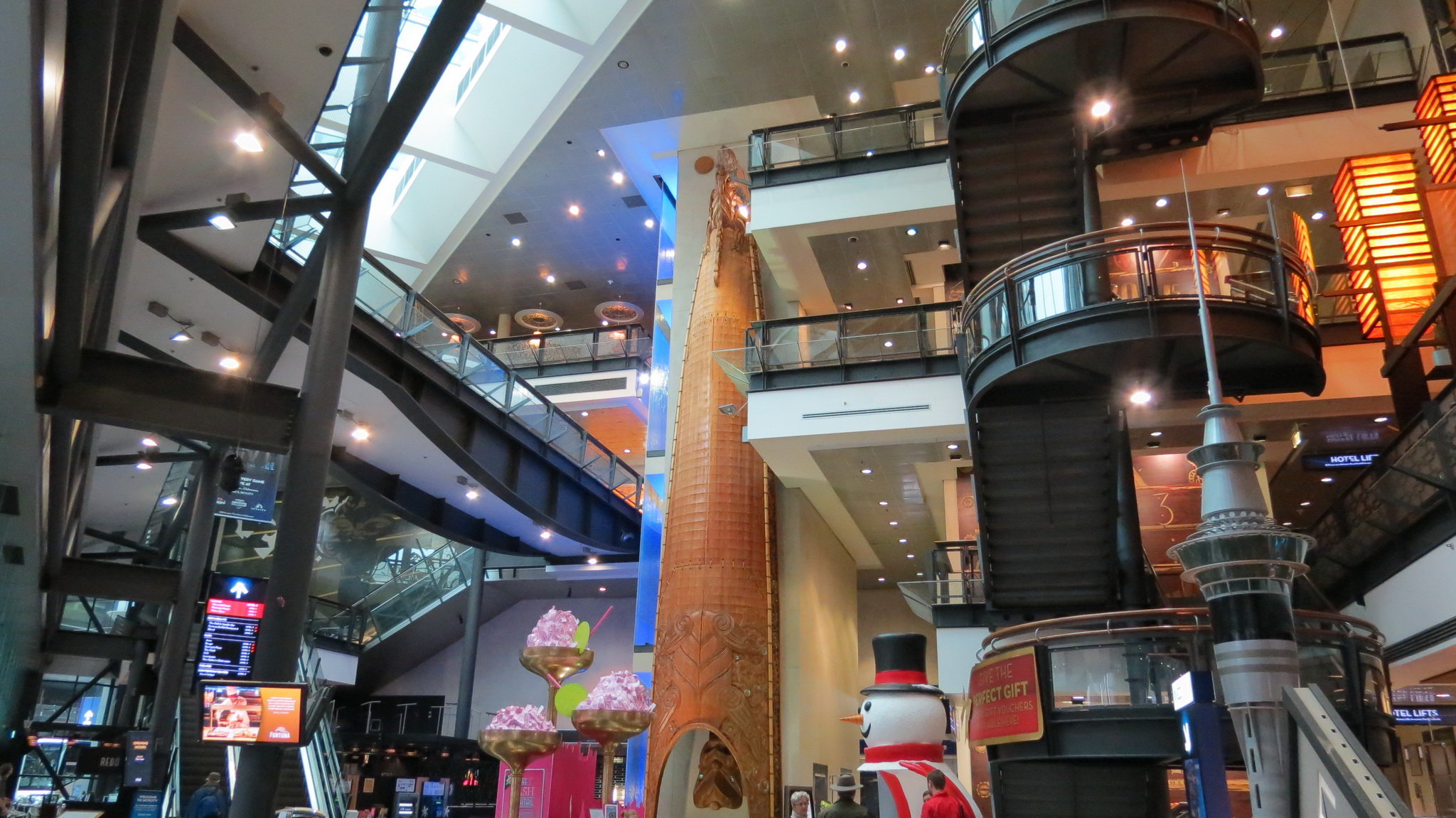
The retail area at the resort

Convention centre exterior

In 2019, the Skycity Convention Centre played host to two world boxing title events, promoted by Bruce Glozier and Steve Deane of Rival Sports Promotions. The first event took place on March 30 Geovana Peres took on Lani Daniels for the WBO World women's light heavyweight title dubbed History in the making. The event sold out with 680 table tickets and was prerecorded to broadcast on Sky Sports TV later in the week. On 30 July, Bruce Glozier of Rival Sports Promotion announced the second world title event, Geovana Peres vs Claire Hafner. As part of promoting the event, Geovana Peres did a world first by doing boxing pad work outside on top of the Sky Tower, 193 metres in the air. The event sold out with over 1000 tickets and was broadcast live on Sky Sports 3 TV.

== New convention centre ==
In May 2013, the Government came to a deal with Skycity to build a new convention centre worth $402 million in exchange for gambling concessions. The concessions would allow Skycity to install an extra 230 poker machines, 40 gambling tables, as well as a further 12 gambling tables that could be substituted for automated table game player stations (but not poker machines). Skycity would also receive an extension to their casino licence, from its expiry in 2021 until 2048. In exchange, Skycity would be required to meet the full costs of the convention centre project.

Describing the benefit for New Zealand, Economic Development Minister, Steven Joyce said the convention centre would add an estimated $90 million a year to the local economy, create 1,000 jobs during construction and 800 jobs once the centre is running.

In 2015 it was announced that the anticipated cost of the convention centre had increased by $70–$130 million, to a total maximum of $530 million. Prime Minister John Key said he was considering making up the shortfall by giving Skycity public tax money to finish the project – as it would be an "eyesore" if the extra funding was not made available. Two days later on 12 February, following criticism in the media and in Parliament, the Prime Minister described the use of taxpayer funds as the "least preferred option". Subsequently, on 15 February, it was announced that instead of seeking funding from the government for project over-runs, Skycity would instead be allowed to build a convention centre which was slightly smaller, so that total costs would remain about $400 million. The other option was that Skycity could put in funds of its own to build a large convention centre. The Labour Party claimed the move was a win for those who were opposed to public money bailing out the deal.

The convention centre was opened in February 2026.

=== 2019 convention centre fire ===
A fire in the roof and upper part of the new convention centre started on 22 October 2019 while the building was still under construction. The fire burned for about two days, partly as a result of a decision to sacrifice the roof in order to try to save the lower part of the building by improving safety and access for firefighters working under the roof. After the roof had mostly burned away the remaining fire was extinguished.

The fire caused widespread disruption to Auckland's central business district and the air pollution in the city to exceed safe levels for the first time in over ten years.

== See also ==
- Gambling in New Zealand
- InterCity bus terminal
- List of integrated resorts
