= SkyCity Entertainment Group =

New Zealand gambling company

SkyCity Entertainment Group Limited
- Type: Public
- Traded as: NZX: SKC; ASX: SKC
- Industry: Gambling & hospitality
- Founded: 1996; 30 years ago
- Headquarters: Auckland, New Zealand
- Key people: Julian Cook; Executive Chairman; Jason Wallbridge; Chief Executive Officer; Blair Woodbury; Chief Financial Officer
- Products: Casinos & hotels
- Revenue: ▲NZ$856 million (2023)
- Net income: ▲NZ$7.98 million (2023)
- Total assets: ▲NZ$2.9 billion (2023)
- Total equity: ▼NZ$1.5 billion (2023)
- Number of employees: 4000+
- Website: skycityentertainmentgroup.com www.skycitycasino.com

SkyCity Entertainment Group is a gambling and entertainment company based in Auckland, New Zealand. It owns and operates five casino properties in New Zealand and Australia, which include restaurants and bars, three hotels, a convention centre and Auckland's Sky Tower.

The group was established in 1996 as the owner of the SkyCity Auckland complex. In 1998 it took over operations of the complex from Harrah's Entertainment.

The company's shares are traded on both the Australian and New Zealand stock exchanges.

== History ==
Since opening its original Auckland casino on 2 February 1996, SkyCity has expanded its operations to several New Zealand and Australian cities.

In June 2000, it bought the Adelaide Casino. It added another casino to its portfolio when it opened SkyCity Queenstown in the alpine resort of Queenstown.

In 2001, SkyCity bought a half share in cinema operator Force Corporation for $19.4 million and rebranded it as SkyCity Leisure.

In June 2004, the group acquired a 41% stake in the Christchurch Casino when it bought Aspinal Limited. Although the deal was opposed by Skyline Enterprises, the other owner of 41% stake, it was approved by the Casino Control Authority and the Commerce Commission. However, in 2012 SkyCity sold its shares to Skyline for $80 million and bought Skyline's 40% stake in Queenstown Casino for $5 million.

In July 2004, SkyCity bought the Darwin Casino and Hotel from MGM Mirage and rebranded it as SkyCity Darwin.

In February 2010, the group sold its cinema operating business to Australian firm Amalgamated Holdings Limited (now Event Hospitality and Entertainment).

In October 2017, the group acquired NPT Limited's interest in AA Centre in Auckland for NZ$47 million.

In November 2018, SkyCity sold the Darwin Casino to American company Delaware North for $188 million.

In June 2019, SkyCity obtained governmental permission to buy a 1.01-hectare parcel of land in Queenstown to develop a new hotel.

In August 2019, SkyCity launched its online gambling website, SkyCity Online Casino. The website is operated by Malta-based Gaming Innovation Group (GiG) on behalf of SkyCity's Maltese subsidiary.

SkyCity casinos often depend to a large degree on several hundred high-stakes gamblers, often from East Asia, who may gamble hundreds of thousands of dollars in one visit to a casino. Reported net profit after tax (NPAT) was $128.7 million, with the Group seeing revenue exceed $1 billion for the first time in the company's history.

As a result of the COVID-19 pandemic, SkyCity announced 200 job losses in New Zealand on 3 April 2020, and a further 700 redundancies a month later, on 11 May. In 2020, SkyCity planned to raise new equity of $230 million as part of its pandemic recovery plan.

In early June 2025, SkyCity sued Fletcher Building and Fletcher Construction for NZ$330 million on the grounds that the companies had taken ten years instead of three years to build the New Zealand International Convention Centre at SkyCity Auckland. SkyCity is seeking damages for losses incurred by the company caused by ongoing delays from the completion of the project, including damages resulting from the New Zealand International Convention Centre fire in 2019. In response, Fletcher said that it would defend itself against the charges, arguing that it had flagged risks associated with the Convention Centre.

=== Management ===
Evan Davies was the founding Chief Executive, before leaving the group in 2008. During Davies' 11 years, the company grew from a single site to having business operations throughout New Zealand, South Australia and the Northern Territory. In April 2016, longtime CEO Nigel Morrison stepped down as managing director and chief Executive. Graeme Stephens was appointed as SkyCity's chief Executive from May 2017 to December 2020, with chief Operating Officer Michael Ahearne stepping in as the new CEO from January 2021. Ahearne announced his resignation in October 2023 to take effect from March 2024.

In February 2024, a significant shift in the company's leadership was announced. Callum Mallett, the then Chief Operating Officer of the New Zealand division, was set to step into the role of Interim CEO following the departure of Michael Ahearne in March 2024. Concurrently, Julian Cook, who was serving as the Board Chairman, decided to take on a more hands-on role in the company. He assumed the position of Executive Chairman, pledging to maintain this active involvement until a permanent CEO was appointed.

== Properties ==
The SkyCity group owns five casinos in Australia and New Zealand: SkyCity Auckland, SkyCity Hamilton, SkyCity Queenstown, SkyCity Wharf Casino and SkyCity Adelaide.

=== SkyCity Adelaide ===
Adelaide Casino was bought by SkyCity Entertainment Group in June 2000. Back then it had 767 gambling machines and 72 table games. Currently it has 990 gambling machines and 90 gambling tables. It has the only table gambling licence issued by the South Australian Government, giving it a monopoly over the gambling business in the state. In 2011 SkyCity financed a $339 million expansion project to make the casino closer to the city's riverfront.

=== SkyCity Auckland ===
SkyCity Auckland is New Zealand's largest casino. Located in Central Auckland, it provides table and slot machine gambling, with 1647 gambling machines and 110 gambling tables. The facility includes the 328-metre (1,076 ft) Sky Tower, two hotels, convention centre, a 700-seat theatre, and more than 20 restaurants and bars with regular live bands, DJs and other entertainment. It opened on 2 February 1996.

SkyCity Hotel, Auckland is a four-star casino hotel. It is one of New Zealand's busiest hotels and is located inside the main Auckland complex. It serves mainly families, business people and casino customers. It has 323 rooms.

SkyCity Grand Hotel is a five-star hotel and was officially opened by the Prime Minister, Helen Clark in April 2005. It is not located inside the main complex but is adjacent and is connected by a sky bridge. The Grand has 21 floors and 316 rooms. In July of 2026, it was reported that SkyCity Entertainment had sold The Grand to an overseas buyer, after it had already sold several adjoining properties.

In 2013, through a deal with the Government, SkyCity pledged to build a new convention centre catering for up to 3,500 guests and costing $NZ402 million, in exchange, it will get more gambling concessions. However, the construction was delayed due to cost increase, and on 22 October 2019 the building caught fire while still under construction.

=== SkyCity Hamilton ===
SkyCity Hamilton is a casino in Hamilton, New Zealand, that opened in September 2002. The casino is authorised to offer a maximum of 339 gambling machines and 23 tables. It has a restaurant and a bar, with live music and other performers on Friday and Saturday nights. It is part of the Riverside Centre on the Waikato River, which includes bars, restaurants and ten-pin bowling all operated by SkyCity Hamilton.

=== SkyCity Queenstown and SkyCity Wharf Casino ===
Queenstown is New Zealand's only city that has two casinos, both are owned and operated by SkyCity. The two casinos are SkyCity Queenstown, opened in December 2000, with 86 gambling machines and 12 gambling tables, and the nearby SkyCity Wharf Casino, situated in the Steamer Wharf complex, with 74 gambling machines and 6 gambling tables. In 2018, the two relatively small casinos contributed only 1% of the company's nearly $1 billion turnover.

== Former properties ==
=== SkyCity Darwin ===
SkyCity Darwin, previously known as the MGM Grand Darwin, was the only casino in Darwin, the capital of the Northern Territory, Australia. SkyCity bought the casino, including a 5 star hotel, from MGM Mirage on 23 June 2004 for US$140 million. SkyCity Darwin housed 700 gambling machines and 40 gambling tables.

SkyCity sold the Darwin property to American company Delaware North in November 2018 for $188 million and it was subsequently renamed as Mindil Beach Casino & Resort.

== Digital operations ==
=== SkyCity Online Casino ===
On 21 May 2019, SkyCity announced a long-term agreement with Malta-based Gaming Innovation Group (GiG) to supply technology for SkyCity's new real-money online casino. SkyCity Online Casino, which operates using GiG's Malta Gaming Authority online gambling licence, was launched in August 2019.

In December 2021, SkyCity invested NZ$42 million in GiG, making it its largest single shareholder with a stake of about 11 percent.

=== LetsPlay.Live ===
SkyCity entered the esports market in October 2017 when it formed a joint venture with Let's Play Live Media (LPLM). SkyCity acquired a 40% stake in LPLM and built an esports broadcasting studio in the Sky Tower which opened in February 2018. Since July 2019, SkyCity has had full ownership of LPLM.

== Controversies ==
=== COVID Wage Subsidies ===
Alongside other eligible New Zealand businesses, SkyCity Entertainment Group received significant financial support in the form of wage subsidies from the government as part of a widespread economic stimulus programme following the COVID-19 outbreak. After initially receiving NZ$21.6 million in taxpayer-funded assistance, the company received an additional tranche of NZ$9.4 million from the central government in July 2020. In all, SkyCity Entertainment Group received over $30 million from New Zealand taxpayers in 2020. Despite then subsequently posting a profit of over NZ$66.3 million, SkyCity steadfastly refused to repay the funds in spite of its bumper profits, a move which was widely condemned across the New Zealand political spectrum and identified as an example of the "waste" and "fraud" treasury had earlier warned of.

=== Financial Crime Allegations ===
==== Australia ====
On first week of June 2021, Australian Transaction Reports and Analysis Centre (AUSTRAC), the Australian financial crime watchdog, intimated SkyCity Entertainment Group along with Crown Resorts and Star Entertainment Group about "potentially serious breaches" of anti-money laundering regulations at their casinos in Adelaide, Perth and Sydney. AUSTRAC alleged that SkyCity Adelaide had contravened the Australian Anti-Money Laundering and Counter-Terrorism Financing Act (AML/CTF Act), and released a statement of claim against

In February 2024, SkyCity Entertainment Group announced to the market that an agreement was reached with AUSTRAC. SkyCity Entertainment Group and AUSTRAC jointly notified the Federal Court of Australia the agreement, and the company also announced an accounting provision of A$73 million in relation to the civil penalty and associated legal costs.

==== New Zealand ====
In December 2023, SkyCity Entertainment Group found itself under scrutiny in New Zealand when the Department of Internal Affairs (DIA), its regulatory body, initiated civil penalty proceedings. The proceedings were against SkyCity Casino Management Limited, a subsidiary of the group, for alleged violations of the New Zealand Anti-Money Laundering and Countering Financing of Terrorism Act 2009 (AML/CFT Act). The company, in conjunction with DIA, estimated that the maximum liability in relation to the claims would be NZ$8 million, although the case is ongoing.

=== Host Responsibility Allegations ===
In New Zealand and South Australia, casinos are required to adhere to a set of guidelines known as "Host Responsibility". This involves a commitment to customer care, with a focus on preventing and minimizing harm related to gambling.

==== New Zealand ====
In September 2023, SkyCity Entertainment Group announced that the DIA had submitted an application to the Gambling Commission to temporarily suspend the license of SkyCity Casino Management Limited. The case is currently under review by the Gambling Commission, with a decision pending. Should the Commission rule in favour of suspension, it could result in a halt of operations at the company's New Zealand casinos for a period of up to ten days.

In July 2024, SkyCity Auckland agreed to a five-day closure of its casino following an investigation by the Department of Internal Affairs, which found breaches of host responsibility requirements. The investigation, prompted by a complaint from a gambler who lost over $1 million, revealed 23 incidents of undetected continuous gambling between 2017 and 2021. The Department of Internal Affairs initially applied for a 10-day suspension of the casino's license but settled on the five-day closure after SkyCity admitted its failings.

== See also ==
- Gambling in New Zealand
- Crown Resorts
- Star Entertainment Group
