= Golden Kiwi =

New Zealand lottery from 1961 to 1989

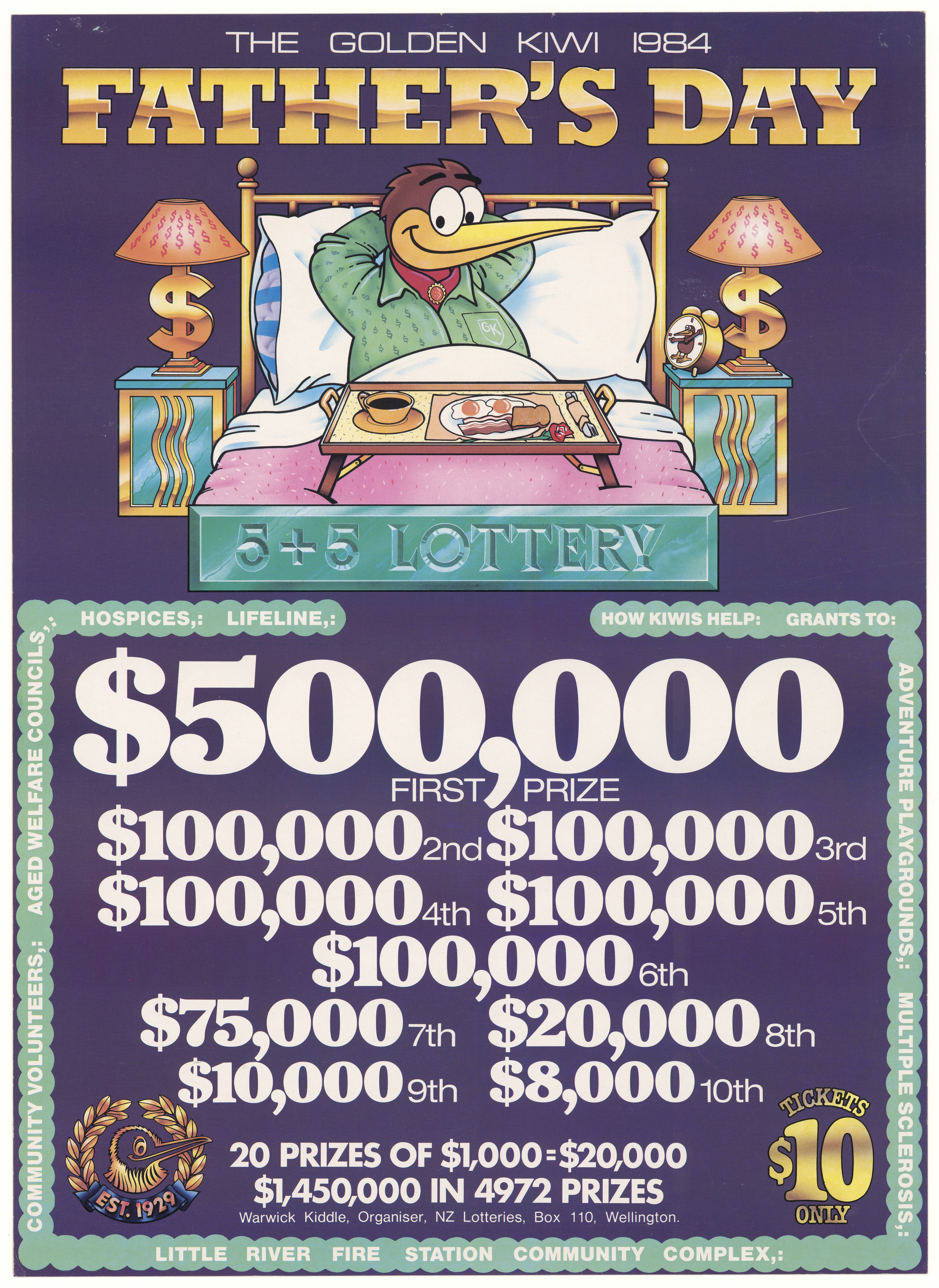
- Fathers' Day Golden Kiwi ticket, 1984
- Region: New Zealand
- First draw: December 1961
- Final draw: 1989
- Operator: New Zealand Lotteries Commission

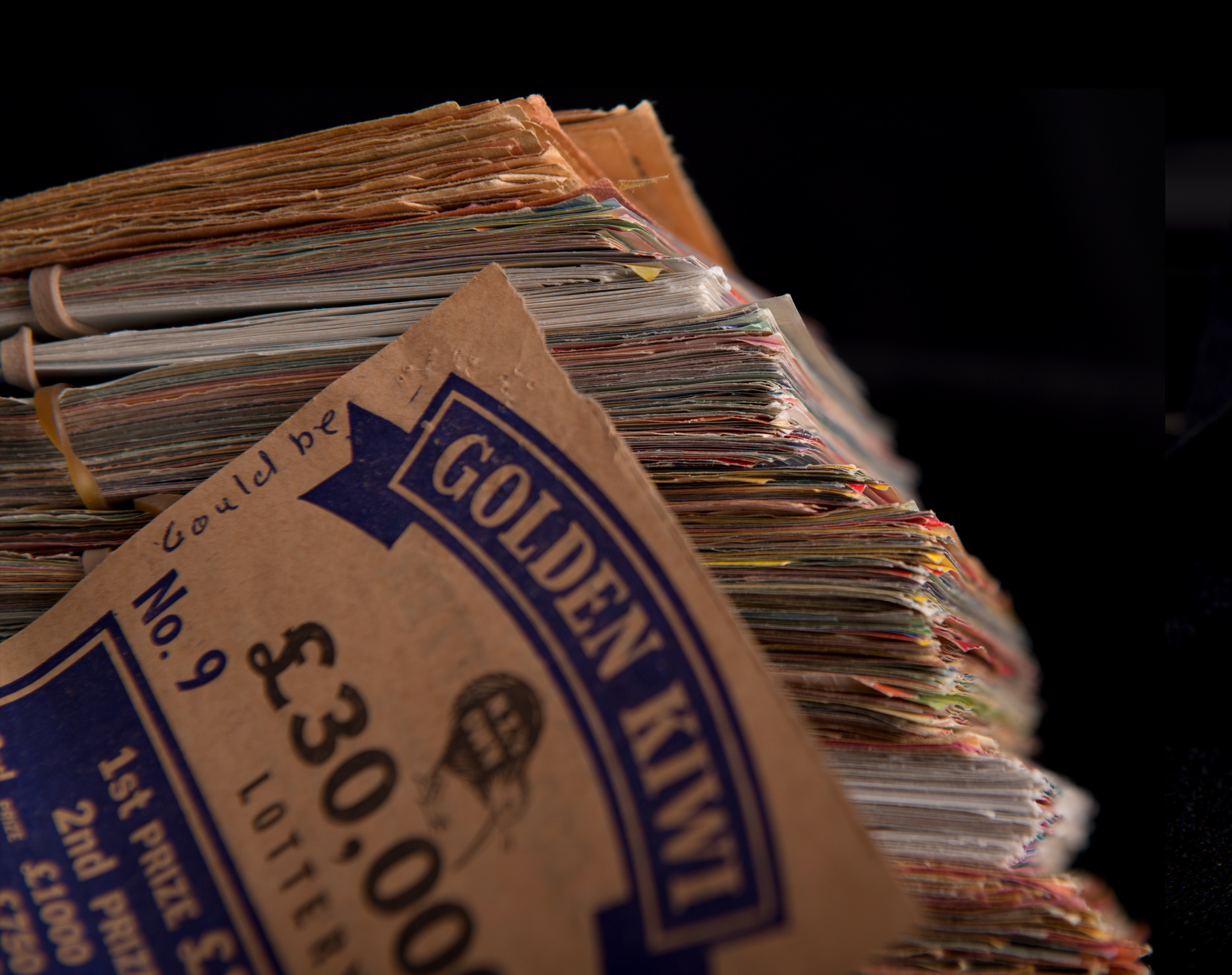
Golden Kiwi tickets

Golden Kiwi was a New Zealand lottery which began in December 1961 and ended in 1989. It was based on philanthropic art union lotteries held for many decades prior. One of the objectives of the Golden Kiwi lottery was to keep funds in New Zealand rather than going to overseas lotteries. In its first year of operation Golden Kiwi raised £1,360,000. Profits from Golden Kiwi were distributed for charitable, philanthropic or cultural purposes for the benefit of the community. Golden Kiwi came under the authority of the New Zealand Lotteries Commission when the Commission was established in 1987. Golden Kiwi sales declined after the introduction of Lotto in 1987, and it ended in 1989 with the introduction of the Instant Kiwi scratch card lottery.

== See also ==
- Gambling in New Zealand
