= Grand Casino Dunedin =

Casino in New Zealand

Coordinates: 45.87778°S 170.50121°E

Grand Casino
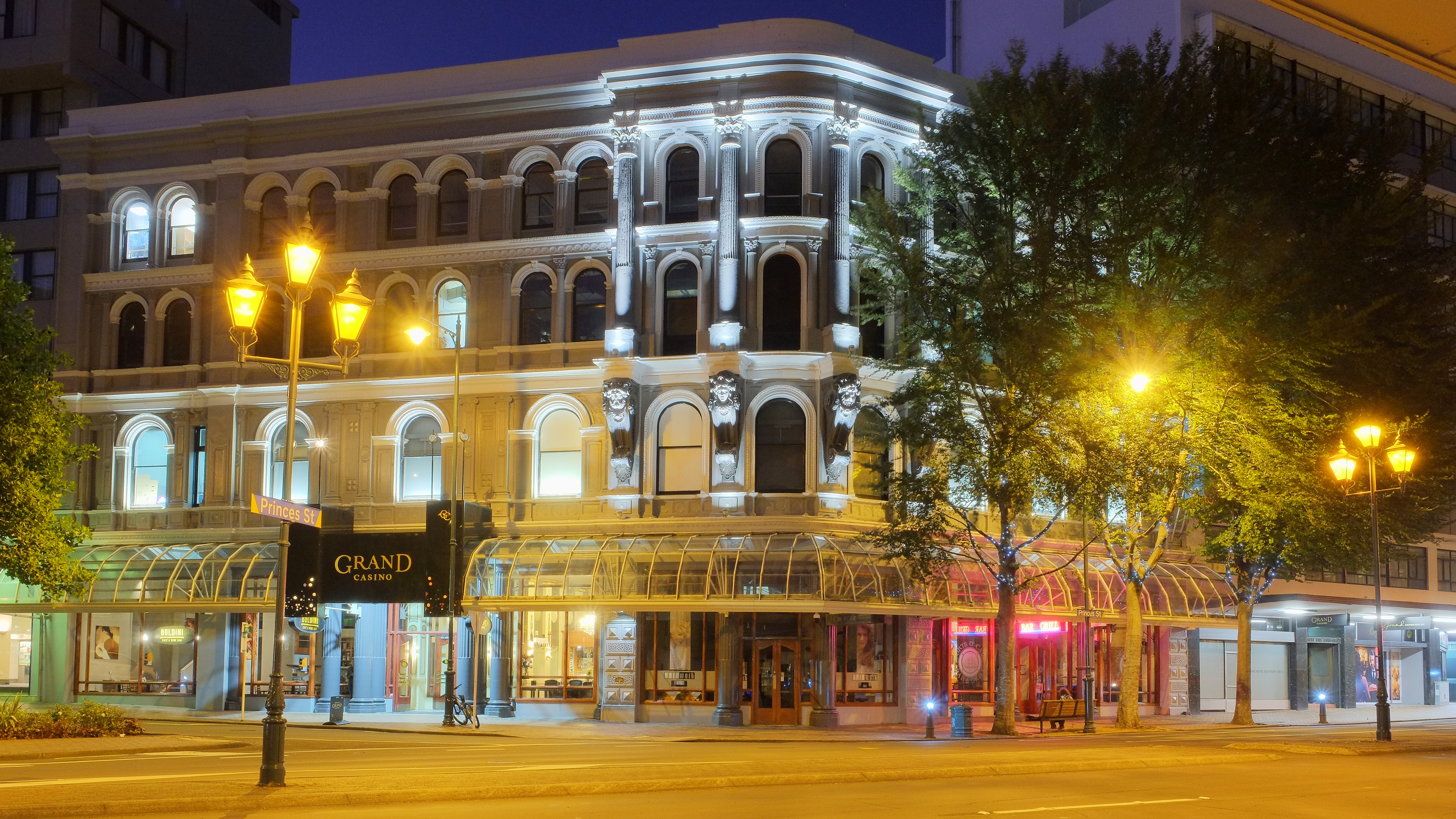
- Southern Cross Hotel building on the corner of High Street and Princess Street
- Interactive map of Grand Casino
- Location: Southern Cross Hotel; Princes Street Central Dunedin, Dunedin, New Zealand
- Opened: 1999; 27 years ago
- Notable restaurants: Grand Bar and Restaurant
- Casino type: Land-based
- Architect: Louis Boldini
- Previous names: Dunedin Casino
- Website: Grand Casino Dunedin

The Grand Casino (formerly Dunedin Casino) opened in 1999 in the city of Dunedin in New Zealand. It is located in The Exchange, a district situated 0.5 kilometres (0.31 mi) south of the city centre, in the historic Southern Cross Hotel building (heritage-listed since 1989), at the corner of Princes Street and High Street. The Hotel, originally named the Grand Hotel, was built in 1883 by Italian architect Louis Boldini. The interior finishing showcases the Victorian taste in classical architecture.

On 17 October 2006, the Gambling Commission suspended the licence of Dunedin Casinos Management Limited for two consecutive days. The Commission found the licence holder to be in breach of the Gambling Act 2003 and a condition of its licence, and "considered that these breaches were material failures to comply with important obligations" in relation to problem gambling.

The Grand Casino, formerly known as Dunedin Casino, was renamed in 2021 in recognition of the building in which the casino resides. The new design won the Heritage Colour Maestro Award at the Resene Total Colour Awards.

== Charitable Trust ==
The Dunedin Casino Charitable Trust, an officially registered independent charitable organization, was founded in 1999. This trust is dedicated to awarding grants to support various initiatives within the local communities of Dunedin and Otago. Since 2019, they have awarded over NZ$640,000 to organisations such as the New Zealand Cancer Control Trust, Dunedin Symphony Orchestra, schools and community centres. As of November 2023, the Trust had donated almost NZ$71,000.

== Gallery ==
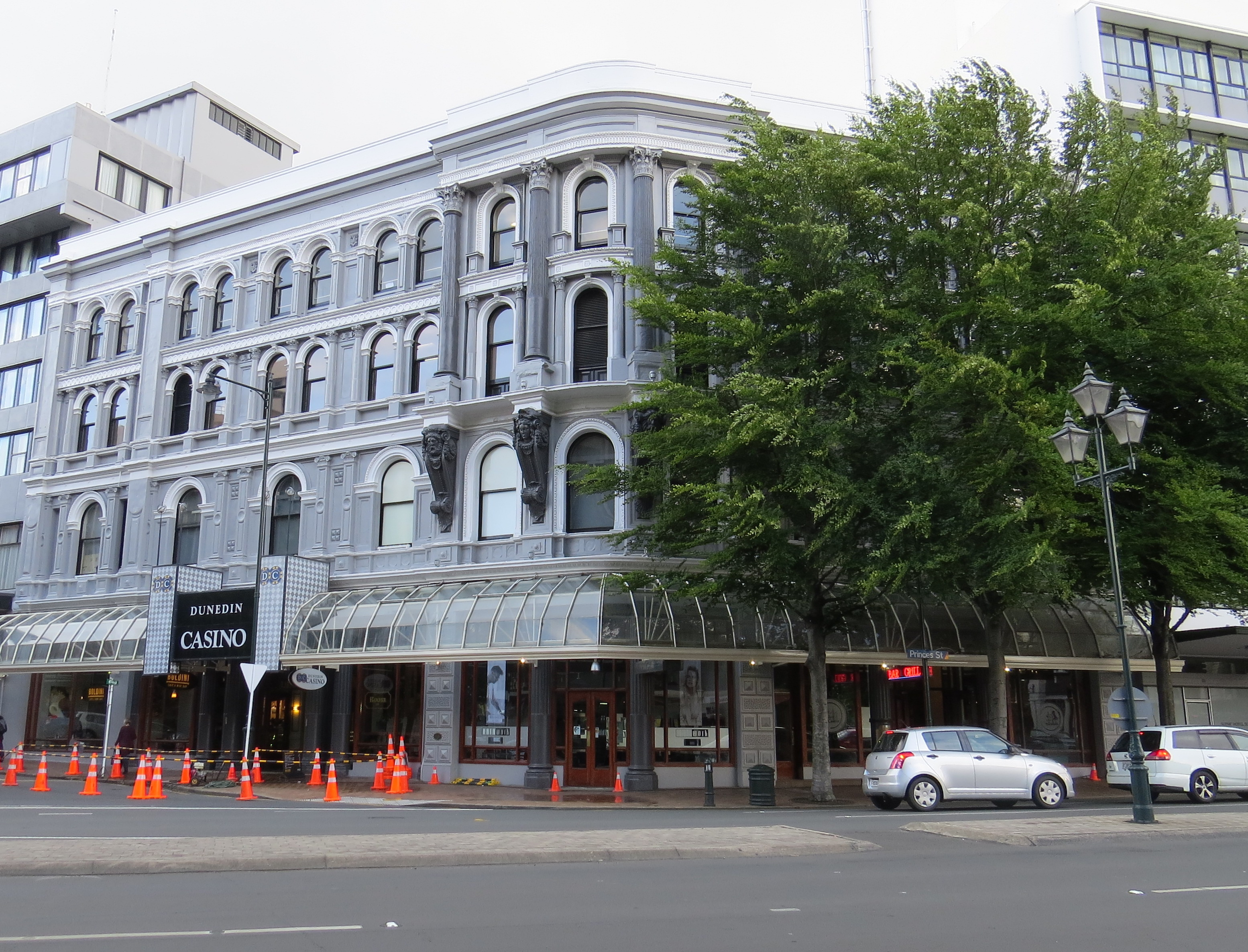
Dunedin Casino. Building designed by Louis Boldini

== See also ==
- Gambling in New Zealand
