= Skyline Enterprises =

Tourist attraction service in Queenstown, New Zealand

Coordinates: 45.0266°S 168.6495°E

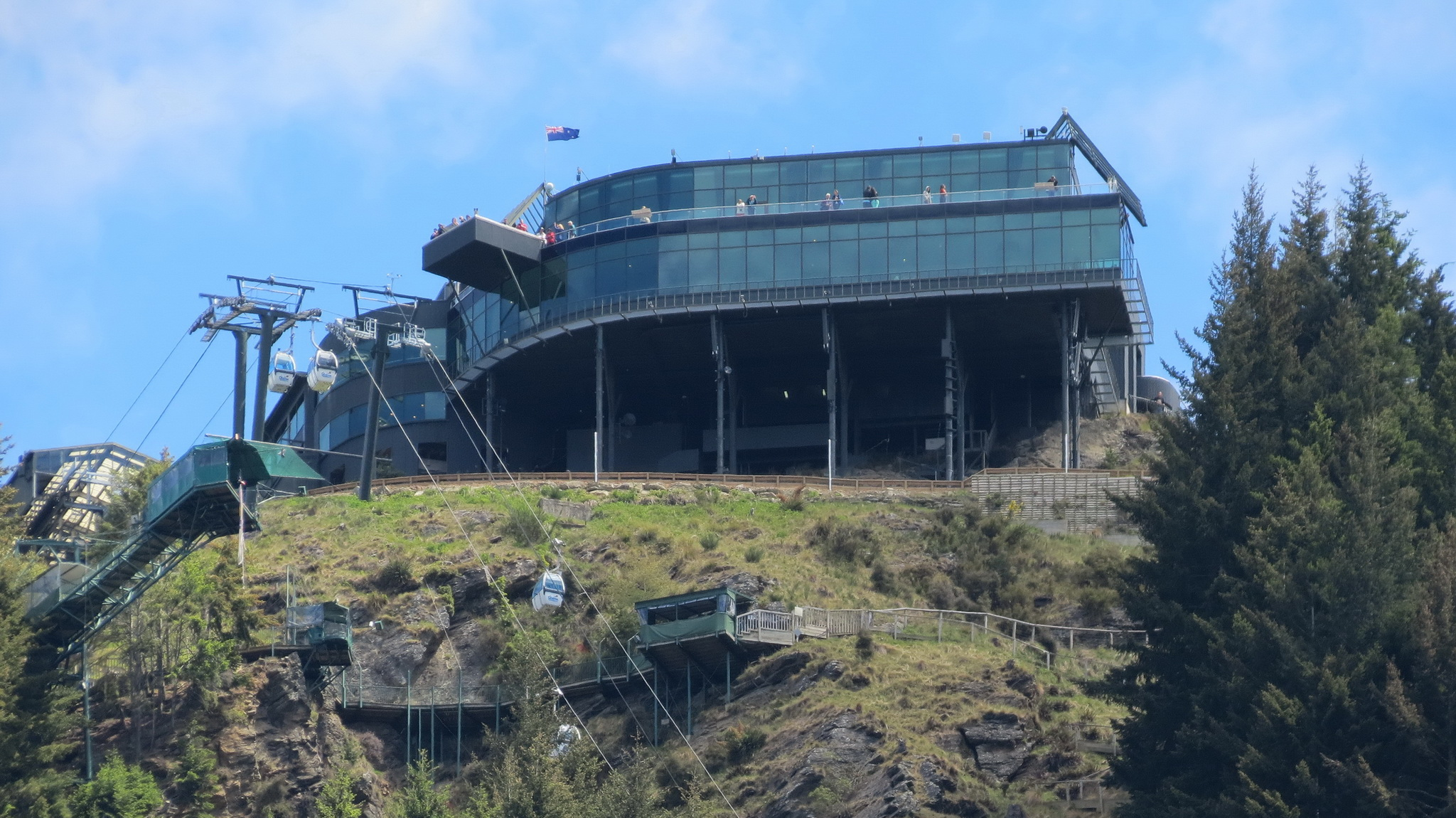
Top station of Skyline Queenstown

Skyline Enterprises is a New Zealand company that operates gondola and luge tourist attractions. Established in New Zealand in 1967, the company's first location was Skyline Queenstown, followed by Skyline Rotorua in 1985. Since 2003, the company has begun establishing luge facilities internationally in Canada, Singapore, South Korea and Malaysia.

== History ==
The prominent hill above Queenstown known as Bob's Peak (itself part of Ben Lomond) was a popular vantage point, but difficult to access due to the steep terrain. Ian Hamilton, a bus company owner, had a road cut in 1961 with a gradient of 1 in 4.5 in places so that he could drive tourists to the view point. Two years after Hamilton's death, Jon Dumble bought his shares and took on two business partners for Skyline Tours. They built a chalet on Bob's Peak, which opened in January 1964. In 1965, planning permission was received to build a gondola, upon which Skyline Enterprises was launched as a public company, which bought out Skyline Tours. Dumble became the company's first managing director.

The gondola system opened officially on 17 November 1967. Since 2011, the gondola can carry mountain bikes up to Bob's Peak.

=== Redevelopment ===
In February 2019, the Environment Court approved the redevelopment of Skyline Queenstown. The project includes a new gondola, a multistorey car park and two new main buildings (bottom and top of mountain). In late 2020 the project was paused due to closed borders caused by COVID-19 pandemic restrictions. The project later re-started.

The entire complex was closed for 9 weeks in 2023 to install the new gondolas. The new base terminal and ticketing hall at the bottom of the mountain also opened in late 2023 and new carpark building was opened in early 2024.

Extension of the terminal and complex at the top of Bob's Peak is currently underway.

=== Luge ===
The luge tracks are over 1,600 metres (5,200 ft) long. The luge features two tracks, the Arrow track and Dart track, the Arrow track is more gentle and the Dart track has a steeper gradient and sharper turns.

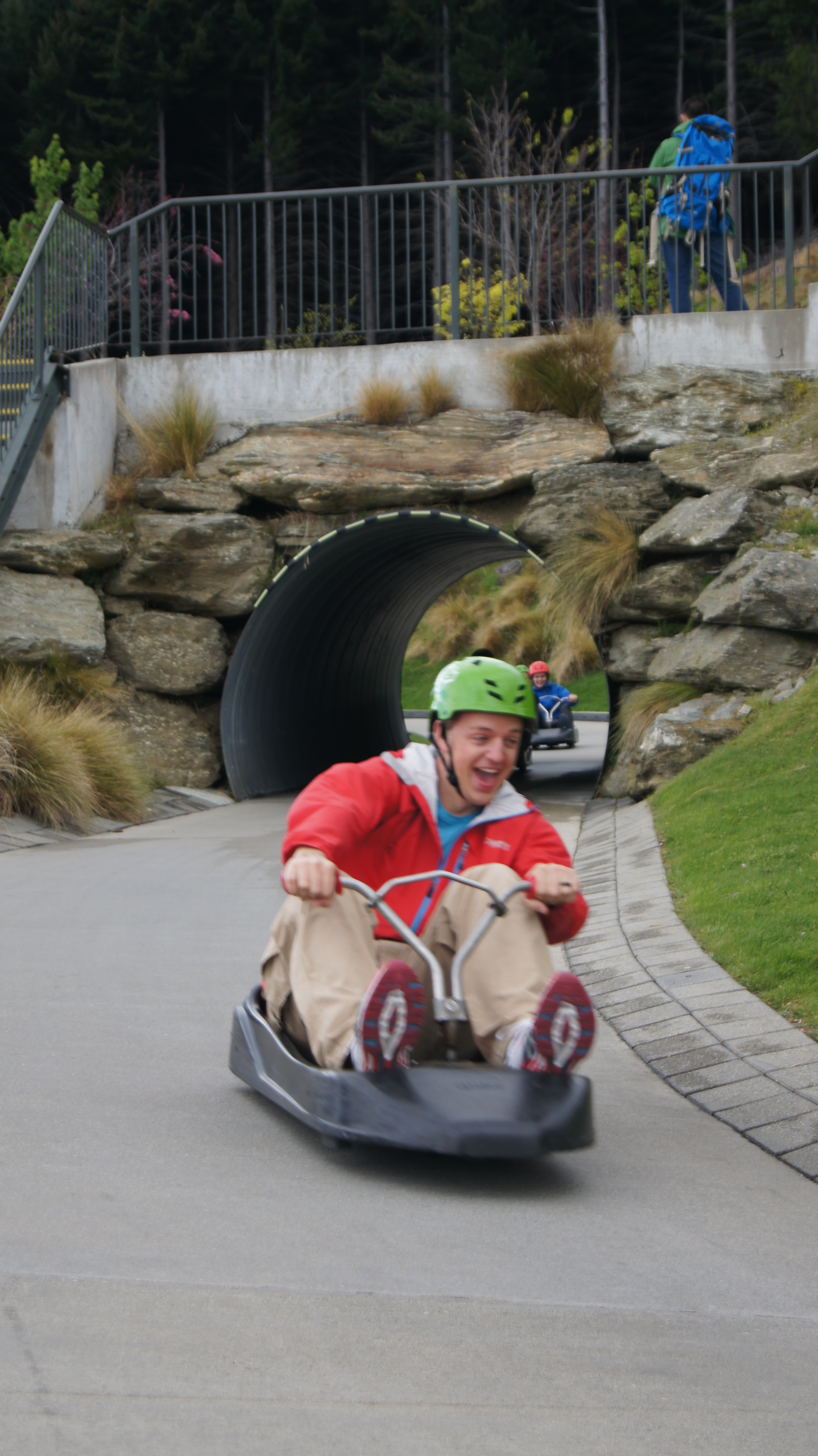
Skyline luge

=== 2023 southern New Zealand floods ===
In mid-August 2025, Skyline Enterprises agreed to pay NZ$10 million to repair the Queenstown Cemetery and Reavers Lane following a slip on Bob's Peak that occurred on 22 September 2023 during the 2023 southern New Zealand floods. By 31 March 2025, Skyline had paid NZ$5.7 million in restitution, with a further NZ$3.7 million expected to be paid over the next few financial years. In mid-December 2025, the Christchurch District Court fined Skyline Enterprises $130,000 and ordered the company to pay a further NZ$78,300 in enforcement costs incurred by the Queenstown Lakes District Council. Skyline also pleaded guilty to breaching the Resource Management Act 1991.

== Description ==
The top terminal building is situated on the slopes of the Ben Lomond mountain peak 450 metres (1,480 ft) above the level of Lake Wakatipu. It has various activities such as a gondola, luge, a mountain biking park, and hiking sites. The main complex features amenities such as a restaurant and bar, cafe and a gift shop.

== Queenstown gondola ==
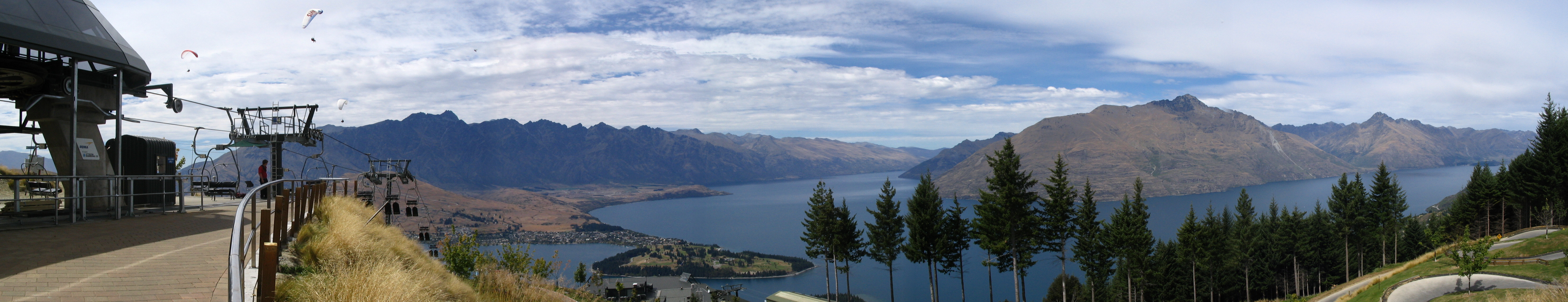
Panoramic view of Lake Wakatipu and the surrounding mountains

The gondola carries visitors to the main Skyline complex; from the viewpoint, it is possible to see across Queenstown, Lake Wakatipu, Coronet Peak, The Remarkables, Walter Peak and Cecil Peak.

== Skyline Enterprises ==
The parent company of Skyline Queenstown has operations around the world:

=== Skyline and Skyline Luge ===
- Skyline and Skyline Luge Queenstown (Queenstown, New Zealand; Skyline since 1967, luge since 1998)
- Skyline and Skyline Luge Rotorua (Rotorua, New Zealand; Skyline since 1985, luge since 1986)
- Skyline Luge Mont-Tremblant (Mont Tremblant, Canada; since 2003)
- Skyline Luge Singapore (Singapore; since 2005)
- Downhill Karting by Skyline Luge Calgary (Calgary, Canada; since 2013)
- Skyline Luge Busan (Busan, South Korea; since 2021)
- Skyline Luge Kuala Lumpur (Kuala Lumpur, Malaysia; since 2023)
- Skyline Luge Tongyeong (Tongeyong, South Korea; since 2017)

Proposed, defunct, and cancelled

- Skyline and Skyline Luge Swansea (Swansea, United Kingdom; under construction for 2028 opening)
- Skyline and Skyline Luge Sheffield (Sheffield, United Kingdom; proposed for Parkwood Springs)

Other projects are currently being looked at in Ireland and Spain. Projects have previously been proposed for Fiordland (cancelled in 2004) and at Franz Josef Glacier (proposed in 2018). Skyline Luge also previously franchised eight Luges in Japan in the 2000s.

=== Other investments ===
- Blue Peaks Lodge and Apartment (Queenstown, New Zealand; since 1975)
- Eichardt's Hotel (Queenstown, New Zealand)
- O'Connells Mall (Queenstown, New Zealand; since 2004)

==== Former investments ====
- Christchurch Casino (Christchurch, New Zealand; 1994–2026)
- Dunedin Leisure Lodge (Dunedin, New Zealand; until 2021)
