= TAB New Zealand =

Statutory monopoly for New Zealand sports betting

TAB Logo

TAB New Zealand (TAB NZ), previously known as the New Zealand Racing Board (NZRB) and the Racing Industry Transition Agency (RITA), is the statutory totalisator monopoly for New Zealand sports betting, including betting on horse racing and greyhound racing. It was established under the Racing Act 2003 to operate the TAB, promote the racing industry and maximise the profits of the industry. It broadcasts racing on two television channels Trackside 1 and 2.

Since 2020, the management rights for TAB New Zealand have been franchised to multinational gaming entity Entain effective June 2023.

The Board is required under the Racing Act to regulate and support the New Zealand racing industry, including managing the racing calendar, promoting best practices, and improving industry facilities and events.

== TAB ==
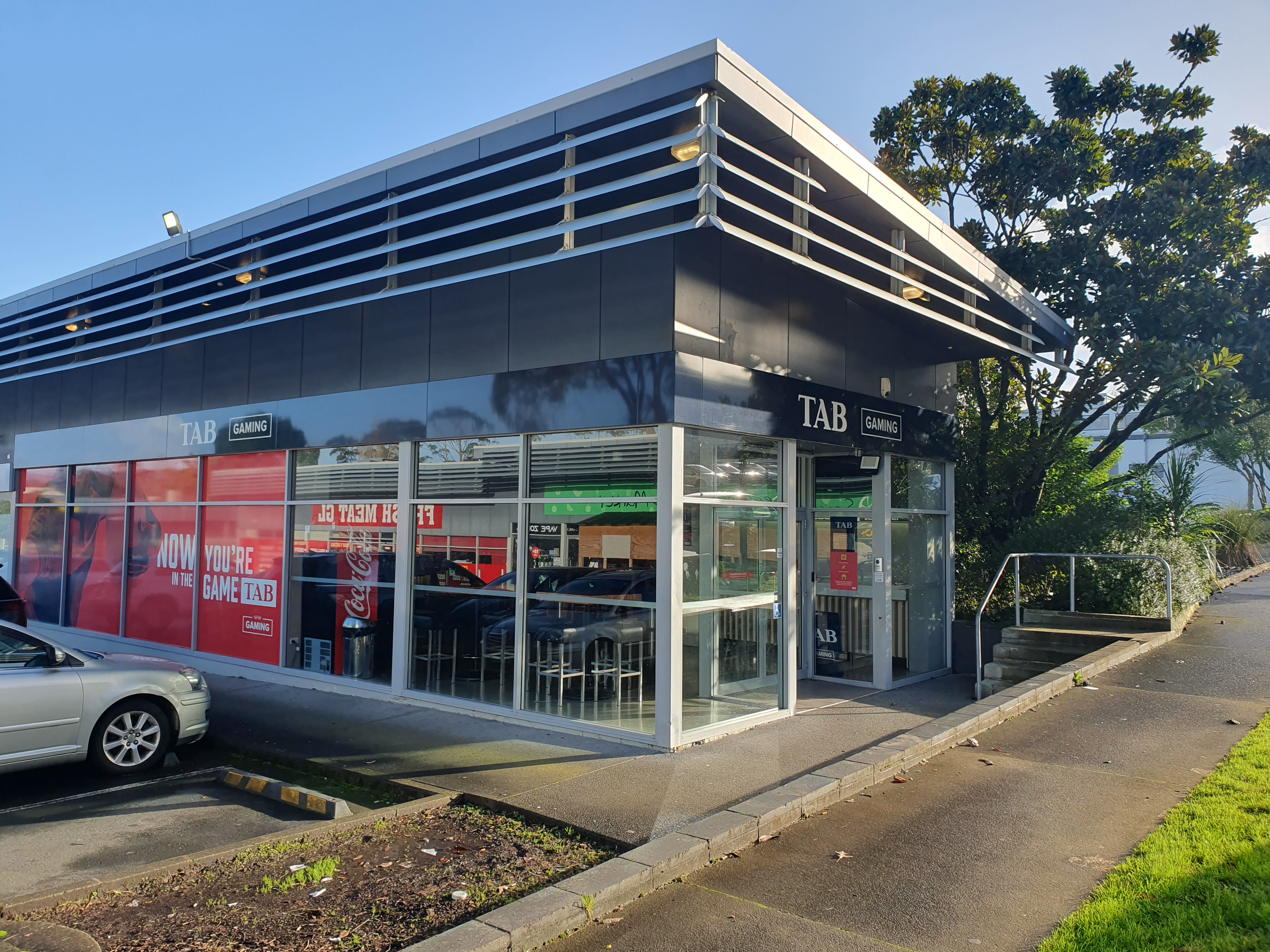
a TAB betting shop in Glen Eden, West Auckland

The NZ Racing Board's income comes from TAB betting revenue. The NZ Racing Board operates around 675 TAB outlets throughout New Zealand as well as On-course Tote Terminals, Internet, Phonebet and Touch Tone wagering channels. TAB Touch Tone, Phonebet and Internet wagering channels service more than 170,000 TAB account holders.

The TAB offers a wide range of totalisator and fixed-odds betting products. Just over 80 percent of the totalisator betting dollar is returned to the customer. The rest is returned to the racing and sporting codes, after tax and NZ Racing Board costs.

=== TAB wagering channels ===
The TAB offers several wagering channels, including on-course betting at racetracks, a national network of retail outlets and social venues, call centres, its website, a Touch Tone phone service, and mobile apps for Android and iOS.

=== TAB wagering products ===
The TAB initiated the world's first Government-run totalisator wagering service in 1951. Today a growing range of tote bet types is on offer, from win, place and each way to Poker and All Up bets, Easybets where the computer picks the runners, weighted towards the favorites, and Percentage betting to cut the cost of placing a bet.

In 1996 it added fixed-odds betting to its stable when the TAB began sports betting. Now 31 sporting codes are covered including matches and fixtures around the world, from rugby football, soccer and cricket to sheep shearing. As with race betting, a proportion of every betting dollar is returned to the New Zealand sporting code on which the bet is taken. The choice of sports betting products included head to head, half / full-time double, winning team and margin, and more.

Fixed odds betting is also available on racing, through Futures books, and Final Field.

In June, 2007 Australian racing product became available to New Zealand customers through the commingling of the Australian Super TAB and New Zealand totalisator pools. More recently the Tabcorp agreement has been extended to include Australian wagering on New Zealand racing product. Commingled pools and the expansion of the New Zealand and Australian race programs provide increased wagering opportunities for customers in both countries. The New Zealand TAB now also take betting on a selection of races from America, England, Hong Kong, Japan, France and Singapore.

=== Spam complaint ===
In August 2011, the TAB was subject to a spam complaint with the Department of Internal Affairs.

=== Impact of COVID-19 pandemic ===
On 26 May 2020, the TAB announced that 230 staff, or approximately 30 percent of its workforce, would be made redundant as a result of the financial impact of the COVID-19 pandemic in New Zealand.

== Responsible gambling ==
The New Zealand Racing Board, under the Racing Act 2003 and associated Regulations, is required to report on programs relating to problem gambling, to provide information and advice on problem gambling and to provide problem gambling training. Since its establishment the NZ Racing Board has taken a proactive stance in meeting its responsibilities for harm prevention and minimisation. Initiatives include:

- Self exclusion programs
- Problem gambling awareness workshops for drug addicts
- Staff intervention policies
- Tools such as maximum bet and loss limits for account holders

== Racing ==
Racing is a long-established sport in New Zealand, with a tradition dating back to colonial times. Today, the industry is a major contributor to the economy and local communities, generating over $1.4 billion annually and supporting around 18,300 full-time jobs. More than 40,000 people earn their livelihoods from racing, while accommodation, travel, fashion, and entertainment sectors also benefit. Over one million people attend race meetings each year, spending more than $55 million on wagering, food, beverages, transport, and accommodation.

There are 69 thoroughbreds, 51 harness and 12 greyhound clubs licensed to race in New Zealand. Racecourses are situated in 59 locations throughout New Zealand. In the racing year from 1 August 2009 to 31 July 2010, 10,106 races were held throughout New Zealand. Further to this the New Zealand Racing Board carried 35,323 overseas races on their network, for a total of 45,439 races covered for the year, an increase of approximately 27% over the previous year.

The bloodstock industry is of international importance to New Zealand, with the export sale of horses – mainly to Australia and Asia – generating more than $120 million a year. New Zealand-bred runners compete very well overseas and regularly win major races, with a particularly good record in Australian distance races.

A major source of funding for the racing industry is returns from betting on racing and sports, which is conducted by the New Zealand TAB, the retail arm of the New Zealand Racing Board.

The New Zealand Racing Board is a co-ordination point for the three racing codes. They are operated by the three governing bodies, New Zealand Thoroughbred Racing (gallops), Harness Racing New Zealand (trotting and pacing) and New Zealand Greyhound Racing.

The Judicial Control Authority (JCA), established in 1996, is the legal body that administers the rules of racing and conducts inquiries into breaches of the rules, for all three racing codes. The JCA ensures that judicial and appeal proceedings in racing are heard and decided fairly, professionally, efficiently, and in a consistent and cost-effective manner. The current focus of the JCA is on contributing to consumer confidence in the racing products.

== Board members ==
The management of the business and affairs of the New Zealand Racing Board takes place under the direction of its governing body, the Board. The seven-member board contains a representative from each of the three codes (greyhound, thoroughbred and harness racing) as well as three independently appointed board members and the board chairman.

Current members are Glenda Hughes (Independent Chair), Rod Croon (Harness Code nominee), Greg McCarthy (Thoroughbred Code nominee), Mauro Barsi (Greyhound Code nominee), Alistair Ryan (Independent Member), Graham Cooney (Independent Member) and Barry Brown (Independent Member).

== Governance ==
The Board has formally constituted three Board committees - the Dates Committee, the Audit and Finance Committee and the Compensation and Development Committee. These committees support the Board by considering relevant issues at a suitably detailed level and reporting back to the Board.

Each committee has written charters setting out their roles and responsibilities, membership, functions, reporting procedures and the how they are to operate. The structure and membership of each committee is reviewed annually.

=== Dates Committee ===
The Dates Committee is established by section 42 of the Racing Act 2003, which requires the committee to determine, following consultation with each of the recognized industry organizations, the annual racing calendar that betting will take place on.

=== Audit and Finance Committee ===
The Audit and Finance Committee assists the Board in discharging its responsibilities concerning to financial reporting and the financial risk management practices of the NZRB, the work and performance of the internal audit function and the NZ Racing Board's external auditor, Deloitte.

=== Compensation and Development Committee ===
The Compensation and Development Committee's purpose is to monitor issues and determine policies and practices related to the remuneration and review of the Chief Executive and the senior management team, as well as overseeing the management development and succession planning process.

=== Leadership ===
In late November 2014 the Board of the NZ Racing Board announced the appointment of John Allen as the organisation's new CEO. John Allen commences his role in early March 2015.

== See also ==
- Gambling in New Zealand
- Thoroughbred racing in New Zealand
