= New Zealand Lottery Grants Board =

- Te Puna Tahua
- Logo of the Lottery Grants Board

Agency overview
- Jurisdiction: New Zealand
- Minister responsible: Hon. Brooke van Velden, Minister of Internal Affairs
- Agency executive: Brendan Boyle, Chief Executive, Secretary for Internal Affairs, Secretary for Local Government
- Parent agency: Department of Internal Affairs
- Website: http://www.dia.govt.nz/lotterygrantsboard

The New Zealand Lottery Grants Board Te Puna Tahua is a business unit of the Department of Internal Affairs in New Zealand.

The New Zealand Lottery Grants Board is governed by the Gambling Act 2003. Its purpose is to benefit the community by distributing the profits from state lotteries run by the New Zealand Lotteries Commission. It does this through a system of distribution agencies and committees that support a wide range of community purposes.

Lottery grants may be given for projects that contribute to the building of strong sustainable communities enabling them to be self-reliant; to build their ability and to ensure their stability, to create opportunities for social, civil or cultural participation, to reduce or overcome barriers to such participation, and to encourage community or environmental health.

The Department of Internal Affairs' Community Operations, Service Delivery and Operations branch administers the New Zealand Lottery Grants Board and its lottery distribution committees. There are advisors to assist applicants in 16 regional offices and the National Office in Wellington.
