= Blind date =

Social engagement

A blind date is a romantic meeting between two people who have never met before.

Both parties arrange a date with little to no information about each other, hoping for the possibility of making a lasting impression. Typically, a family member or a friend is responsible for arranging this meet-up, and the date is always unexpected.

While its origin is unknown, it has been said that they were popularized in the early 20th century in the United States or in the early matchmaking efforts in Jewish communities in Eastern Europe in the 19th century.

== Etymology ==
The term "blind date" derives from its constituent words, "blind" (i.e., something done without knowledge of certain facts) and "date" (i.e., a social engagement between two persons that often has a romantic character). Coined in the United States during the 1920s, it originally referred to the activity itself (1921), then later to the participants (1925).

== Structure ==
A blind date is arranged by a mutual acquaintance of both participants. The two people who take part in the blind date may have never met or seen each other, hence the phrase "blind date". Therefore, it is the responsibility of the acquaintance who arranges the date to ensure that they are a good match. Sometimes one person is more interested than the other, which may make it more difficult on the person arranging the date to judge whether the date will be successful.

The date is usually two hours or less, as it is just a first date and is really meant to introduce the two people more than it is meant to create a relationship. Furthermore, due to the unfamiliarity of the two people, the date is shorter than most because they are in the beginning stages of a relationship. The date is also very adventurous in the way that neither party knows what to expect and whether or not they will hit it off. The location of the date is also affected by the spontaneity in that it is often a neutral and public place so that both parties feel comfortable.

=== Online dating ===
Family and friends have been less influential over the dating market for the past 60 years. Since 1997, the rise of the Internet has also displaced the neighborhood, the workplace, and the circle of friends as sources of dating partners. As of May 2013, it was estimated that 11% of adult Americans had used online dating websites or mobile dating applications, and 59% of American Internet users agreed that online dating was a good way to meet people (as of 2013). China's largest online dating site reported over 100 million users in September 2013. For couples that have been together for more than a year, the choice of venue (online vs. real life) had little influence on relationship success.

Online dating services ask questions in the form of a survey in order to get to know the user better and to understand what they are looking for in a relationship. After the information is gathered, the matching users would be found based on various algorithms. The users are then encouraged to communicate with each other.

According to a study done by Match.com, in an effort to determine how much impact their services are having on the way relationships develop today, "17% of couples married in the last 3 years met each other on an online dating site" and "1 out of 5 single people have dated someone they met on an online dating site".

Nonetheless, there are thousands of online dating websites. The most popular ones are eHarmony with 20 million profiles and Match.com with 15 million profiles.

== By country ==
=== China ===
Chinese parents tend to find their children blind dates in parks. "Spouse-hunting fairs in big city parks by parents eager to see their children tie the knot have made parks in China a haven for relationship hunters and their parents". Zhongshan Park has been the location where parents go to seek partners for their children. This process begins by the parents sitting on a bench with their child's credentials such as photos including academic and career information. After information has been exchanged and the parents like what they see, questions are asked about issues ranging from their child's zodiac sign to their place of residence. If everything runs smoothly during the second step, contact information is exchanged. This process can be very stressful for the parents and the child because they are not always in agreement. This makes it even more difficult for a partner to be found. Li, a middle-aged man who has experienced blind dates says he has met women "who have no intention of finding a boyfriend. Meeting me is merely to indulge their parents".

=== Iran ===
In 2024 Iranian government removed a popular trending Reels IG TV show blind date.

=== South Korea ===
South Korean blind dating customs are preferred rather than other dating techniques. There are two kinds of blind dates in South Korea: "mee-ting" and "sogeting". Mee-ting blind dates are group dates with no prior expectations of commitment and are often used by university students. A sogeting date is engaged in by people who are "single and looking", and includes less alcohol than a mee-ting date.

== Examples in popular culture ==
=== Radio ===
- Blind Date (radio series), a 1940s American dating game show.

=== Television ===
- Blind Date (American game show), an American dating game show based on the previous 1940s radio version.
- Parental Control - An MTV reality show where parents pick two dates for their son or daughter. The parents ask the candidates a series of questions in order to pick the best two. After each of the dates, the son or daughter, chooses whether they would like to stay with their significant other or if they would like to start a new relationship with one of the blind dates.
- Blind Date Australia - Is an Australian dating game show produced by Sony Pictures Television. The show has the same format as the British and American versions of the show and was first aired in 1967 with Graham Webb being the host. The show has had a number of hosts over its years including Graham Webb (1967–1969), Jeremy Cordeaux (1970), Bobby Hanna (1974), Greg Evans (1991) and Julia Morris, who is the current host of the rebooted show which began in October 2018 and is in its seventh season. The show currently airs on Network 10.
- Blind Date UK - Is a British dating game show is produced by London Weekend Television. An unscreened pilot was made with comic Duncan Norvelle as presenter, but it was eventually hosted by Cilla Black, who already hosted the LWT series, Surprise Surprise. Blind Date ran on Saturday nights from 1985 to 2003.
- Blind Date USA - Is an American dating game show, created by John Degnan, that aired in syndication from 1999 to 2006. Hosted by Roger Lodge, the series was distributed by Universal Worldwide Television.
- The Choice - Is an American television show where male celebrities sit with their backs to the stage. The female contestants have a specific amount of time on stage to win the affection of the male celebrities. If the men are interested, they turn their chairs. At the end of each show, the men choose a woman to go out on a date.
- The Dating Game - A game show created by Chuck Barris where a single woman would sit on one side of a wall and three bachelors would sit on the other side. Each male participant would answer questions from the woman and at the end of the show, she would choose a candidate to go out on a blind date. This game even promoted its own board game.
- The Bachelor - An American television show which started in 2002 where a single man goes on a blind date with 25 women who wish to become his wife. The women live together in one household and are competing in an elimination game for a rose and an invitation from the bachelor to stay another week. This show has prompted other spin-off shows like The Bachelorette, Bachelor Pad and Bachelor in Paradise.
- The Amazing Race 26 - In a departure from the regular format, 10 single contestants were matched into 5 couples (4 heterosexual couples and a homosexual couple) based on compatibility tests in what was billed by producers as The most extreme blind date. These 5 couples were joined by 6 couples in a pre-existing relationship.

=== Film ===
- Blind Date - A 1934 American film starring Ann Sothern and Neil Hamilton
- Blind Date - A 1987 American movie where Walter Davis (Bruce Willis) gets hooked up on a blind date with Nadia (Kim Basinger) by his brother so he can have a date to his office party.
- Go-Con! Japanese Love Culture - A 2000 Japan film
- Blind Date - A 2015 French film starring Mélanie Bernier and Clovis Cornillac.
- Man Up - A 2015 British-French romantic comedy starring Lake Bell and Simon Pegg. The film follows a single 34-year-old woman, who after being mistaken for a stranger's blind date, finds the perfect boyfriend in a 40-year-old divorcé.

== See also ==
- Speed dating
- Online dating
