= Mike Kim (poker player) =

Korean American poker player

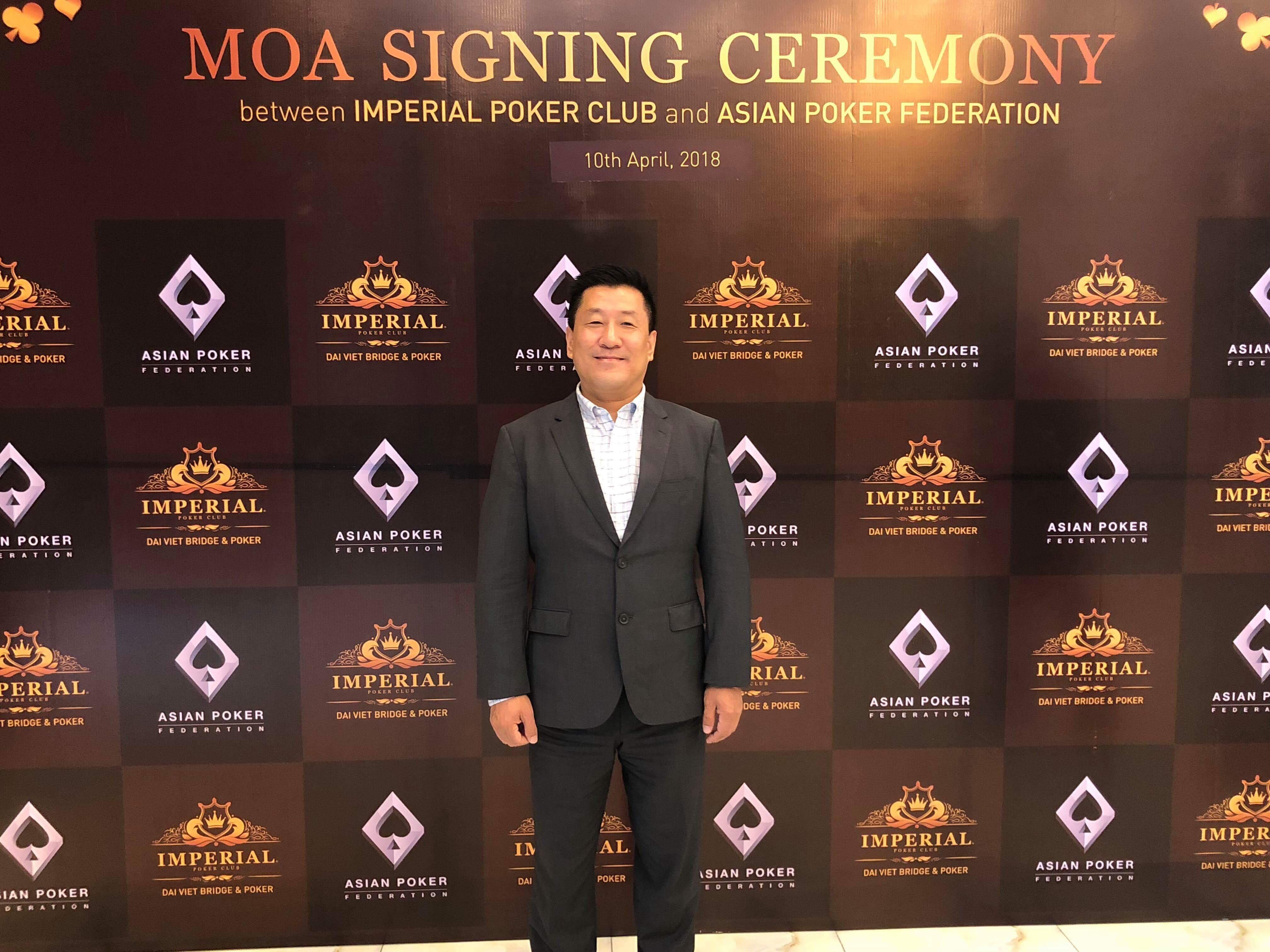
Kim at an event in 2018.

Mike Kim (Michael Kim) is a professional poker player and the founder of the Asian Poker Federation and MK Global Management Solutions Inc., a gaming service provider based in Metro Manila, Philippines.

== Biography ==
Kim started his career as an online poker player in 2003 while studying mechanical engineering at the University of Illinois, then started playing full-time once he started earning enough money from it. Kim established the first poker room in South Korea and launched a poker room in Macau at the Starworld Hotel.

In the Philippines, he opened and operated Solaire Poker Room at the Solaire Resort and Casino, Manila. Kim also opened LT Poker in Okada Manila. He later partnered with the online poker company PokerStars, at City of Dreams Manila.

In early 2016, Kim opened Mike's Room in Manila. The venue received a total of 1,403 entries for Kim's Millionaire Maker tournament.

Kim brought the Asian Poker Tour, the Asia Pacific Poker Tour, and the World Poker Tour to the Philippines.

In 2018, Kim expanded his business into Europe together with business partners Jori Falkstedt and Miikka Saloseutu.

== Poker events ==
At the 2009 PokerStars APPT Macau, Kim finished 2nd, winning $384,999. He finished 22nd in the 2013 PokerStars APPT Seoul and earned 4,750,000 KRW. At the 2015 PokerStars APPT Season 9 Manila, Kim finished 15th and earned 274,400 PHP. Kim finished 5th in the 2013 WSOP Circuit River Rock Main Event, with $64,979 in payouts. Kim won the main event of the PokerStars LIVE Manila Megastack 2 in 2015.
