= Australia New Zealand Poker Tour =

Global poker tournament

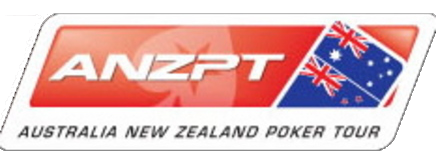
- ANZPT logo (2015)
- Sport: poker
- Founded: 2009
- Folded: 2015
- Replaced by: Asia Pacific Poker Tour
- Owner: GPTL at The Stars Group
- President: Danny McDonagh
- Region: Oceania
- Most titles: (Australia) Tony Hachem (2009/2010)
- Sponsor: PokerStars
- Website: pokerstarslive.com

The ANZPT – Australia New Zealand Poker Tour was a southern hemisphere poker tour operated by PokerStars. It ran for seven seasons from 2009 before closing in 2015 after merging with the APPT – Asia Pacific Poker Tour.

== History ==
The ANZPT – Australia New Zealand Poker Tour was created in 2009 as a series of poker tournaments for local players in the Australia and New Zealand region, as the low entry (around AS2,000) were not attractive for professional players from US or Europe to travel so far to the region. This helped establish PokerStars live events in the region by encouraging local players to participate in tournaments under the PokerStars brand, glamour and prestige.

Between 2009 and 2015, several cities had the presence of ANZPT, in Australia they were: Adelaide, Sydney, Gold Coast, Perth, Canberra, Melbourne and Darwin and in New Zealand the cities chosen were Queenstown and Auckland.

During the 7 seasons, several awards were distributed to the Players of the Year, with Tony Hachem being the biggest champion, winning two years in a row in the first and second seasons. Tony is the brother of Joe Hachem, the 2005 World Series of Poker main event winner. In 2013, Anthony Hachem, son of Joe Hachem won ANZPT Melbourne.

At the same time, PokerStars organized another tour in the vicinity, with the APPT – Asia Pacific Poker Tour even having some tournaments from seasons 5, 6 and 7 happening together, expanding the reach of the APPT tournaments in the Pacific.

In 2015, it was announced by Global Poker Tours Ltd., a subsidiary for live events of Amaya Inc. (owner of PokerStars between 2014 and 2019), that ANZPT would merge with APPT and the brand would cease to exist, with only APPT continuing to organize poker events in the pacific region. "I have been very proud to be a part of the ANZPT," said APPT and ANZPT President Danny McDonagh. "There have been many memorable stops including Darwin, Gold Coast, and Queenstown together with the big city venues such as Sydney and Melbourne. The tour has preserved the freeze out format in the $2,000 range, a decision vindicated by how popular the series has been with players."

== ANZPT Main Event winners ==
=== Season 1 (2009) ===
Date	Event / City	Players	Prize Pool	Winner	Prize	Results
31 January- 7 February	ANZPT Adelaide A$3,000; SkyCity Adelaide, Adelaide, SA, Australia	215	A$568,950 (~$365,694)	(Australia) Karl Krautschneider	A$170,215 (~$109,406)	
23 April- 3 May	ANZPT Sydney A$2,200; The Star Sydney Casino, Sydney, NSW, Australia	493	A$986,000 (~$696,746)	(Australia) Paren Arzoomanian	A$246,500 (~$174,186)	
19–25 July	ANZPT Queenstown NZ$2,500; SkyCity Queenstown, Queenstown, Otago, New Zealand	134	NZ$301,500 (~$194,212)	(Australia) Daniel Chevalier	NZ$87,435 (~$56,321)	
5–9 August	ANZPT Gold Coast A$2,500; The Star Gold Coast, Gold Coast, QLD, Australia	249	A$622,500 (~$524,325)	(Australia) Scott Kerr	A$168,075 (~$141,568)	

- Australia New Zealand Poker Tour – Season 1 (2009) – Leaderboard Champion: Tony Hachem

=== Season 2 (2010) ===
Date	Event / City	Players	Prize Pool	Winner	Prize	Results
2–14 February	ANZPT Adelaide A$3,000; SkyCity Adelaide, Adelaide, SA, Australia	236	A$644,280 (~$569,751)	(Australia) Rennie Carnevale	A$165,900 (~$146,709)	
13–21 March	ANZPT Perth A$2,500; Crown Casino, Perth, WA, Australia	222	A$510,600 (~$467,065)	(Australia) Tony Hachem	A$132,750 (~$121,523)	
15–25 April	ANZPT Sydney A$2,200; The Star Sydney Casino, Sydney, NSW, Australia	446	A$892,000 (~$829,636)	(Australia) Angelo Hanataj	A$219,432 (~$204,091)	
11–14 June	ANZPT Canberra A$2,200; Casino Canberra, Canberra, ACT, Australia	181	A$362,000 (~$305,310)	(England) Jason Gray	A$95,930 (~$80,907)	
17–25 July	ANZPT Queenstown NZ$2,500; SkyCity Queenstown, Queenstown, Otago, New Zealand	119	NZ$267,750 (~$234,076)	(Australia) Julian Cohen	NZ$73,630 (~$64,370)	
11–15 August	ANZPT Gold Coast A$2,500; The Star Gold Coast, Gold Coast, QLD, Australia	287	A$717,500 (~$653,342)	(Australia) Nauvneel Kashyap	A$182,965 (~$166,604)	
2–11 October	ANZPT Melbourne A$2,700; Crown Melbourne, Melbourne, VIC, Australia	310	A$775,000 (~$752,062)	(Australia) Martin Kozlov	A$195,700 (~$189,908)	
25–30 October	ANZPT Darwin A$2,200; SkyCity Darwin, Darwin, NT, Australia	100	A$200,000 (~$196,591)	(New Zealand) Danny Leaoasavaii	A$57,000 (~$56,028)	

- Australia New Zealand Poker Tour – Season 2 (2010) – Leaderboard Champion: Tony Hachem (2)

=== Season 3 (2011) ===
Date	Event / City	Players	Prize Pool	Winner	Prize	Results
25 January- 6 February	ANZPT Adelaide A$2,400; SkyCity Adelaide, Adelaide, SA, Australia	253	A$551,540 (~$546,881)	(Australia) Octavian Voegele	A$148,900 (~$147,642)	
17–27 March	ANZPT Perth A$2,500; Crown Casino, Perth, WA, Australia	220	A$500,600 (~$495,555)	(Australia) Grant Levy	A$131,500 (~$130,175)	
4–17 April	ANZPT Sydney A$2,200; The Star Sydney Casino, Sydney, NSW, Australia	393	A$786,000 (~$816,072)	(Australia) Michael Kanaan	A$195,714 (~$203,202)	
17–22 May	ANZPT Gold Coast A$2,500; The Star Gold Coast, Gold Coast, QLD, Australia	245	A$563,500 (~$595,622)	(Australia) Peter Matusik	A$145,100 (~$153,371)	
10–13 June	ANZPT Canberra A$2,200; Casino Canberra, Canberra, ACT, Australia	134	A$267,900 (~$284,187)	(Australia) Xiuming "Sammy" Huang	A$73,600 (~$78,074)	
15–26 September	ANZPT Melbourne A$2,400; Crown Melbourne, Melbourne, VIC, Australia	310	A$620,000 (~$635,845)	(New Zealand) Lee Nelson	A$156,550 (~$160,551)	
29 September- 8 October	ANZPT Darwin A$2,200; SkyCity Darwin, Darwin, NT, Australia	64	A$128,000 (~$126,457)	(Australia) Jack Drake	A$36,480 (~$36,040)	

- Australia New Zealand Poker Tour – Season 3 (2011) – Leaderboard Champion: Daniel Chevalier

=== Season 4 (2012) ===
Date	Event / City	Players	Prize Pool	Winner	Prize	Results
14–25 March	ANZPT Sydney A$2,200; The Star Sydney Casino, Sydney, NSW, Australia	461	A$922,000 (~$970,864)	(Scotland) Gordon Huntly	A$226,812 (~$238,832)	
26 April- 6 May	ANZPT Perth A$1,100; Crown Casino, Perth, WA, Australia	310	A$310,000 (~$320,192)	(Australia) Mathew Carlsson	A$78,275 (~$80,848)	
23–29 July	ANZPT Queenstown Snowfest NZ$3,000; SkyCity Queenstown, Queenstown, Otago, New Zealand	149	NZ$402,300 (~$321,454)	(Australia) David Allan	NZ$110,600 (~$88,374)	
20 August- 3 September	ANZPT Melbourne Grand Final A$5,000; Crown Melbourne, Melbourne, VIC, Australia	257	A$1,207,900 (~$1,258,347)	(England) Samad Razavi	A$326,125 (~$339,745)	

- Australia New Zealand Poker Tour – Season 4 (2012) – Leaderboard Champion: Mishel Anunu

=== Season 5 (2012/2013) ===
Date	Event / City	Players	Prize Pool	Winner	Prize	Results
11–29 October 2012	ANZPT Melbourne A$2,200; Crown Melbourne, Melbourne, VIC, Australia	345	A$690,000 (~$705,507)	(New Zealand) Paul Hockin	A$101,275 (~$103,551)	
17–25 November 2012	ANZPT Auckland NZ$2,200; SkyCity Auckland, Auckland, North Island, New Zealand	207	NZ$414,000 (~$335,147)	(New Zealand) Geoff Smith	NZ$80,502 (~$65,169)	
14–24 February 2013	ANZPT Perth A$2,200; Crown Casino, Perth, WA, Australia	219	A$438,000 (~$452,797)	(Bosnia and Herzegovina) Dejan Divkovic	A$114,000 (~$117,851)	
11–24 March 2013	ANZPT Sydney A$2,200; The Star Sydney Casino, Sydney, NSW, Australia	460	A$920,000 (~$941,254)	(Switzerland) Dinesh Alt	A$226,320 (~$231,548)	
20 May- 3 June 2013	ANZPT Melbourne A$1,100; A$750,000 Prizepool guaranteed Crown Melbourne, Melbourne, VIC, Australia	844	A$844,000 (~$820,636)	(Australia) Anthony Hachem	A$181,460 (~$176,437)	
30 July- 4 August 2013	APPT/ANZPT Queenstown; Snowfest NZ$3,000; SkyCity, Queenstown, Otago, New Zealand	126	NZ$340,200 (~$274,300)	(Australia) Jonathan Bredin	NZ$93,600 (~$75,469)	

- Australia New Zealand Poker Tour – Season 5 (2012/2013) – Leaderboard Champion: (Japan) Iori Yogo

=== Season 6 (2013/2014) ===
Date	Event / City	Players	Prize Pool	Winner	Prize	Results
16–24 November 2013	ANZPT Auckland NZ$2,200; SkyCity Auckland, Auckland, North Island, New Zealand	213	NZ$426,000 (~$353,457)	(New Zealand) David Lim	NZ$110,760 (~$91,899)	
20 February- 2 March 2014	ANZPT Perth A$2,200; Crown Casino, Perth, WA, Australia	226	A$512,000 (~$462,111)	(United States) Patrick Mahoney	A$120,000 (~$108,307)	
12–24 March 2014	ANZPT Sydney A$2,200; The Star Sydney Casino, Sydney, NSW, Australia	458	A$916,000 (~$826,208)	(Australia) Joshua Redhouse	A$123,500 (~$111,393)	
20 August- 1 September 2014	ANZPT Melbourne A$2,200; Crown Melbourne, Melbourne, VIC, Australia	516	A$1,032,000 (~$965,144)	(Australia) Edison Nguyen	A$217,500 (~$203,410)	
19–23 November 2014	APPT/ANZPT Auckland NZ$2,500; SkyCity Auckland, Auckland, North Island, New Zealand	225	NZ$506,250 (~$401,952)	(Australia) Minh Hau Nguyen	NZ$111,600 (~$88,608)	

- Australia New Zealand Poker Tour – Season 6 (2013/2014) – Leaderboard Champion: David Lim

=== Season 7 (2015) ===
Date	Event / City	Players	Prize Pool	Winner	Prize	Results
5–15 February	ANZPT Perth A$2,200; Crown Casino, Perth, WA, Australia	192	A$393,600 (~$306,716)	(Scotland) Michael Kane	A$98,900 (~$77,069)	
11–23 March	APPT/ANZPT Sydney A$2,300; The Star Sydney Casino, Sydney, NSW, Australia	445	A$912,250 (~$696,821)	(Australia) Dimitrios Psaros	A$183,000 (~$139,784)	
8–20 October	ANZPT Melbourne A$2,300; Crown Melbourne, Melbourne, VIC, Australia	520	A$1,066,000 (~$780,878)	(Australia) Lin Shi	A$170,641 (~$125,000)	

- Australia New Zealand Poker Tour – Season 7 (2015) – Leaderboard Champion: Aristomenis Stavropoulos
