= Donnie Sutherland =

Australian television presenter

Donnie Sutherland OAM
- Born: Donald Sutherland; 22 December 1946 (age 79); Fairfield, New South Wales, Australia
- Genre: Pop
- Occupations: Radio, television presenter, singer
- Instrument: Vocals
- Years active: 1965–1991
- Labels: RG; Du Monde; Violets Holiday; ATA
- Formerly of: The Titans; The Cleves
- Website: donniesutherland.com

Donald Sutherland OAM (born 22 December 1946) is an Australian radio and television presenter. He was the host of TV pop music show Sounds between 1975 and 1987. Sutherland has also worked as a TV producer and music journalist, and is associated with the local greyhound racing industry.

== Biography ==
Sutherland was born on 22 December 1946 in Fairfield, New South Wales to his father, Andrew Ross Sutherland (1913–1976), who was a bus driver and his mother Maisie Olive (née Ringe) (1918–2002). His older brother, Ross Sutherland, was an apprentice jockey who died in February 1958, aged 18, after a four-horse collision at Gosford race-track. His younger brothers are Ken and Ted. The family lived at Bossley Park. At 14 years old Sutherland also became an apprentice jockey, but increasing weight ended this career after four years.

From mid-1965 Sutherland recorded voice demos for job applications as a radio presenter. He fronted the Titans, who released a single, "Mocking Bird Hill", in March 1966. Norm McLeod of The Biz noted that "one of his records, just released, has brought him much praise from critics. The young vocalist first came into prominence when he was a member of a band making weekly appearances at the Marconi Club."

From September 1968 to July 1971, Sutherland wrote for teen-based pop music newspaper, Go-Set, as one of their Sydney-based correspondents. He "was given the task of producing a weekly Sydney gossip and news page. The column known as 'Donnie's Place', was only published in the New South Wales edition, and is in keeping with the strategy of keeping Go-Set local and national at the same time." Ian Meldrum, his counterpart in Melbourne, had been with Go-Set from July 1966.

In 1969, Sutherland released his first solo single, "Fairyland", on Du Monde Records, which was a cover version of a song by United Kingdom group, Pop Workshop, from the previous year. It peaked in the top 50 on the local Sydney-based singles chart. It was one of the first stereo singles recorded in Australia, and was produced by John Eggington, at United Sound Studio, Pyrmont.

In the early 1970s, Sutherland began a career as a radio disc-jockey with 2UW.

In March 1975, Sutherland became the presenter of the Channel 7's pop music TV show, Sound Unlimited (later shortened to Sounds). He took over from original host (and former radio DJ) Graham Webb, who remained as the show's producer. It was broadcast each Saturday morning for twelve years until 1987, and was a long-term competitor to the ABC's pop music series, Countdown, hosted by Meldrum. During its early years, Sounds was seen only in Sydney, but later it was relayed nationally, although its first hour (9 a.m. –10 a.m.) was still seen in Sydney only, due to time zone differences, with the following two hours (10 a.m. – 12 p.m.) screened nationwide.

Debbie Kruger described how the show "was brilliant. Donnie often appeared hung over, his guests often appeared hung over, but everyone trapsed [sic] into the Sound Unlimited studio at some stage during the show's 16-year run—Sherbet, JPY, Jon English, Marcia Hines, and the odd overseas guest who could handle live TV on a Saturday morning." The Canberra Times' Keith Gosman observed "[Sutherland] is not very young. What makes this program even more indigestible is that it has more disc jockies [sic] on it than Countdown. I remember one program when disc-jockies "from all over Australia" appeared and gave their views on the current state of Australian pop music... This program also showcases a hefty amount of disco which speaks for itself." John Byrell of The Australian Women's Weekly described how his lifestyle of "Too much work too many late nights and a poor diet are doing the damage... [he had] a minor physical and nervous collapse" a year earlier.

In October 1980, Sutherland hosted an evening TV special, Olivia's Greatest Hits, to focus on the music of Olivia Newton-John. Also in that month, he organised a charity event, "Wonder Wheel", during which celebrities, including Gaynor Martin (Skyways actress), Lynda Stoner and Nick Jones (2SM DJ), raced across Sydney Harbour for Royal Alexandra Hospital for Children.

From 1982 to 1985, Sutherland also hosted a late-night music and chat show, After Dark, which had a relaxed style. This featured chat segments with Australian and overseas music and entertainment identities, interspersed with music videos; on occasions when Sutherland was unavailable, it was guest-hosted by music personalities Stuart Coupe or Glenn A. Baker. Notable international guests on the show included Steve Marriott, John Cooper Clarke, the Ramones and Jello Biafra.

From 1978 Sutherland also hosted five hours of disco music presented on Sydney radio station 2UW on Saturday nights from 7pm to midnight which lasted a year.

Sutherland also appeared in the 1983 film At Last... Bullamakanka: The Motion Picture.

At the conclusion of his tenure with Sounds, Sutherland worked with the emerging Sky Channel until 1991.

Sutherland was diagnosed with throat cancer in March 2014 and started chemotherapy and radiation treatments. In December of that year, after a recurrence of the cancer, he had surgical removal of portions of his throat including his larynx.

== Discography ==
=== Singles ===
List of singles, with selected chart positions
Title	Year	Peak chart positions
Title	Year	AUS
"Fairyland"	1969	—
"Bonnie, Bonnie, Bonnie" (with The Cleves)	1971	—
"Dancing Man"	1977	78

== Honours ==
On Australia Day in January 2000 Sutherland was awarded a Medal of the Order of Australia with a citation "For service to the music and entertainment industries, particularly the promotion of Australian performers, and to the community as a compere of fundraising events." In the following January he was awarded the Centenary Medal "For service to the Centenary of Federation celebrations."
