= Daniel Schreiber =

Dan Schreiber is an Australian radio producer.

Daniel or Dan Schreiber may also refer to:

- Dan Schreiber (poker player), American pro gamer and poker player
- Daniel Schreiber (businessman), co-CEO and chairperson of Lemonade, Inc.

== See also ==
- Daniela Schreiber
- Daniel Paul Schreber
