= Asia Pacific Poker Tour season 3 results =

Below are the results of the third season of the Asia Pacific Poker Tour. All currencies are US dollars unless otherwise stated.

== Events ==
=== (Macau) APPT Macao ===
- Casino: Lisboa Hotel & Casino, Macau
- Buy-in: 40,000 HKD (5,160 USD)
- 7-Day Event: August 24–30, 2009
- Number of buy-ins: 429
- Total Prize Pool: $2,080,999
- Number of Payouts: 48

Final Table
Place	Name	Prize
1st	(Republic of Ireland) Dermot Blain	$541,072
2nd	(South Korea) Mike Kim	$384,982
3rd	(China) Daoxing Chen	$239,315
4th	(Kazakhstan) Darkhan Botabayev	$166,489
5th	(Sweden) Pontus Kers	$114,459
6th	(China) Jicheng Su	$74,921
7th	(Canada) Dbinder Singh	$52,030
8th	(United States) Brandon Demes	$41,619
9th	(Sweden) Stefan Hjorthall	$31,221

=== (New Zealand) APPT Auckland ===
- Casino: Skycity Casino
- Buy-in: NZD 3,250 Buy-in
- 5-Day Event: October 14–18, 2009
- Number of buy-ins: 263
- Total Prize Pool: $581,785
- Number of Payouts: 32

Final Table
Place	Name	Prize
1st	(New Zealand) Simon Watt	$154,043
2nd	(France) Gerome Guitteau	$104,676
3rd	(New Zealand) Jason Brown	$61,061
4th	(China) Ke Sijia	$40,707
5th	(New Zealand) Richard Lancaster	$31,403
6th	(Germany) Jens Walther	$23,261
7th	(Australia) Assadour Assadourian	$17,446
8th	(New Zealand) Lance Climo	$13,957
9th	(United States) Michael Shinzaki	$10,468

=== (Philippines) APPT Cebu ===
- Casino: Shangri-la Mactan Resort, Cebu
- Buy-in: 100,000 PHP
- 5-Day Event: November 11–15, 2009
- Number of buy-ins: 319
- Total Prize Pool: $630,312
- Number of Payouts: 40

Final Table
Place	Name	Prize
1st	(South Korea) Dong-bin Han	$157,532
2nd	(United States) David Hilton	$108,210
3rd	(South Korea) Sim Somyung	$61,652
4th	(New Zealand) Kevin Clark	$43,293
5th	(United States) Terry Fan	$30,826
6th	(Philippines) Mark Pagsuyuin	$24,448
7th	(Netherlands) Nick Pronk	$18,602
8th	(New Zealand) Phillip Willcocks	$14,882
9th	(Russia) Alexandr Tikholiz	$11,161

=== (Australia) APPT Sydney ===
- Casino: Star City Casino, Sydney
- Buy-in: 6,300 AUD
- 6-Day Event: Dez 1-6, 2009
- Number of buy-ins: $2,173,038
- Total Prize Pool: 396
- Number of Payouts: 48

Final Table
Place	Name	Prize
1st	(Australia) Aaron Benton	$543,807
2nd	(Netherlands) Ernst Hermans	$349,124
3rd	(Australia) Leo Boxell	$195,771
4th	(Australia) Wayne Carlson	$152,266
5th	(Australia) Tom Grigg	$119,638
6th	(Australia) Andrew Hiscox	$97,885
7th	(Australia) Barry Forrester	$76,133
8th	(Australia) David Formosa	$59,819
9th	(United States) Thomas Slifka	$43,505
