= Asia Pacific Poker Tour season 1 results =

Below are the results of the first season of the Asia Pacific Poker Tour. All currencies are US dollars unless otherwise noted.

== Events ==
=== (Philippines) APPT Manila ===
- Casino: Hyatt Hotel & Casino Manila
- Buy-in: $2,500
- 3-Day Event: Friday, August 24, 2007, to Sunday, August 26, 2007
- Number of buy-ins: 255
- Total Prize Pool: $599,250
- Number of Payouts: 24
- Winning Hand: 10♠ 10♦

Final Table
Place	Name	Prize
1st	(United States) Brett Parise	$179,775
2nd	(United States) Ira Blumenthal	$113,858
3rd	(United States) Nicholas Bamman	$62,921
4th	(Australia) Van Marcus	$44,940
5th	(Israel) Maor Feldinger	$35,955
6th	(Sweden) Roger Spets	$26,966
7th	(Netherlands) Bas van Liere	$20,974
8th	(Japan) Kazuhiro Sato	$14,981
9th	(Philippines) Derick Hernandez	$11,386

=== (South Korea) APPT Seoul ===
- Casino: Paradise Walker-Hill Casino
- Buy-in: $2,500 + $200
- 2-Day Event: Saturday, September 29, 2007, to Sunday, September 30, 2007
- Number of buy-ins: 186
- Total Prize Pool: $437,100
- Number of Payouts: 16
- Winning Hand: K♦ 10♣

Final Table
Place	Name	Prize
1st	(Israel) Ziv Bachar	$139,000
2nd	(Australia) Jozef Berec	$87,420
3rd	(United States) Shinhan Sid Kim	$48,081
4th	(Canada) Michel St-Pierre	$34,968
5th	(New Zealand) James Honeybone	$28,412
6th	(Norway) Seval Hegeland	$21,855
7th	(Sweden) Roger Spets	$17,484
8th	(United States) Dan Schreiber	$13,113
9th	(United States) Paul Adams	$8,740

=== APPT Macau ===
- Casino: Grand Waldo Hotel & Casino
- Buy-in: $2,500
- 6-Day Event: Thursday, September 22, 2007, to Tuesday, September 27, 2007
- Number of buy-ins: 352
- Total Prize Pool: $809,600
- Number of Payouts: 40
- Winning Hand: 8♦ 8♠

Final Table
Place	Name	Prize
1st	(Vietnam) Dinh Le	$222,640
2nd	(Singapore) Ivan Tan	$129,536
3rd	(South Korea) Sangkyoun Kim	$72,864
4th	(Canada) Guillaume Patry	$56,672
5th	(France) Bertrand Grospellier	$48,576
6th	(Australia) William Tam	$40,480
7th	(United States) Liz Lieu	$32,384
8th	(Australia) Joe Hachem	$24,288
9th	(United Kingdom) Simon Randall	$16,192

=== (Australia) APPT Sydney ===
- Casino: Star City Casino
- Buy-in: A$6,300
- 4-Day Event: Thursday, December 13, 2007, to Sunday, December 16, 2007
- Number of buy-ins: 561
- Total Prize Pool: A$3,366,000 (US$2,580,286)
- Number of Payouts: 56
- Winning Hand: Q♠ 6♠

Final Table
Place	Name	Prize
1st	(Australia) Grant Levy	A$1,000,000 (US$875,542)
2nd	(United States) Jeremiah Vinsant	A$621,540 (US$544,184)
3rd	(Australia) Lei He	A$322,280 (US$282,170)
4th	(Canada) Sol Bergren	AUS230,200 (US$201,550)
5th	(Australia) Jai Kemp	A$158,838 (US$139,069)
6th	(United States) Barry Kohlhoff	A$115,100 (US$100,775)
7th	(United States) John Matwey	A$92,080 (US$80,620)
8th	(Malaysia) Vijayan Nagarajan	A$69,060 (US$60,465)
9th	(United States) Larry Wright	A$46,040 (US$40,310
