= 1942 in radio =

The year 1942 saw a number of significant happenings in radio broadcasting history.

== Events ==
- 1 January – All radio broadcasting in the Netherlands comes under full control of the country's Nazi occupiers. Publication of the only authorized programme guide, De Luistergids, begins.
- 9 January – Blue Network Company, Inc. is incorporated by RCA in the United States to hold the assets of the NBC Blue Network, in case NBC loses their case against the FCC in court to maintain ownership of two networks.
- 29 January – The BBC Forces Programme transmits the first edition of Desert Island Discs, presented by Roy Plomley. Vic Oliver is the first castaway. The series will still be running (on BBC Radio 4) more than 75 years later.
- 23 February – Fireside chat by the President of the United States: On Progress of the War.
- 24 February – The Voice of America begins short-wave radio broadcasting using CBS and NBC transmitters. Its first programmes are in German.
- 27 February – James Stanley Hey, a British Army research officer, helps develop radio astronomy, when he discovers that the sun emits radio waves.
- 6 March – U.S.-born Nazi propaganda broadcaster Jane Anderson ("The Georgia Peach") gives a talk from Berlin which reveals that elite Germans are still dining in luxury despite widespread food insecurity in the country, which is successfully used by U.S. counterpropaganda, leading to her being dropped from the airwaves.
- 28 April – Fireside chat: On Our National Economic Policy.
- 6 May – The Radio Doctor (Charles Hill) makes his first BBC Radio broadcast giving avuncular health care advice to British civilians.
- 19 May – A subsequently famous BBC outside broadcast recording captures the song of the common nightingale with the sound of Royal Air Force Lancaster bombers flying overhead.
- 26 July – Gene Autry takes his oath of office to join the United States Army during the broadcast of Gene Autry's Melody Ranch.
- September – The Brains Trust first broadcast under this title on BBC Home Service radio in the United Kingdom.
- 7 September – Fireside chat: On Inflation and Progress of the War.
- 12 October – Fireside chat: Report on the Home Front.
- 8 November – Aspidistra medium wave radio transmitter goes into service in the south of England for black propaganda and military deception purposes against Nazi Germany.

== Debuts ==
- 2 January: Elsa Maxwell's Party Line debuts on the Blue Network.
- 24 January: Abie’s Irish Rose debuts on NBC.
- 3 February: Red Ryder debuts on NBC Blue West Coast.
- 1 March: KBON, Omaha, Nebraska, a Mutual affiliate, begins broadcasting on 1400 kHz with 250 W power (full-time).
- 4 March: Junior Miss (1942–1954) debuts on CBS.
- 22 March: The Better Half debuts on Mutual.
- 3 April: People Are Funny debuts on NBC.
- 5 April: The Army Hour debuts on NBC.
- 13 April: Are You a Genius? debuts on CBS.
- 19 April: WJLD, Bessemer, Alabama, begins broadcasting on 1400 kHz with 250 W power.
- 1 May: In Person, Dinah Shore debuts on the Blue Network.
- 6 May: The Radio Doctor (Charles Hill) makes his first BBC radio broadcast giving health care advice.
- 9 June: Cheers from the Camps debuts on CBS.
- 17 June: Suspense debuts on CBS following its 1940 pilot on Forecast.
- 18 July: Chips Davis, Commando debuts on CBS.
- 30 July: Stage Door Canteen debuts on CBS.
- 2 August: Hop Harrigan debuts on ABC.
- 3 August: An American in England debuts on CBS.
- 28 August: Canteen Girl debuts on NBC.
- 6 September: Mayor of the Town debuts on NBC.
- 13 September: Radio Reader's Digest debuts on CBS.
- 20 September: The Electric Hour debuts on CBS.
- 2 October: The Cisco Kid debuts on Mutual.
- 7 October: The Man Behind the Gun debuts on CBS.
- 10 October: Campana Serenade debuts on NBC.
- 14 October: Cresta Blanca Carnival debuts on CBS.
- 20 October: Songs by Sinatra debuts on CBS.
- 31 October: The Bob Hawk Show debuts on CBS.
- 9 November: Ceiling Unlimited debuts on CBS.
- Eva Duarte (later Eva Perón, First Lady of Argentina) makes her debut as a radio actress in Muy Bien on Radio El Mundo.

== Closings ==
- (undated) - Harold Teen ends its run on network radio (Mutual).
- 3 January: The Bishop and the Gargoyle ends its run on network radio (Blue Network).
- 3 April: Captain Flagg and Sergeant Quirt ends its run on network radio (NBC).
- 26 April: Songs by Dinah Shore ends its run on network radio (NBC-Blue).
- 26 June: Arnold Grimm's Daughter ends its run on network radio (NBC).
- 23 August: Great Plays ends its run on network radio (Blue Network).
- 11 September: The Bartons ends its run on network radio (NBC).
- 22 September: Cheers from the Camps ends its run on network radio (CBS).
- 25 September: The Story of Bess Johnson ends its run on network radio (NBC).
- 27 September: Joe and Mabel ends its run on network radio (NBC).
- 3 November: The Avenger (radio program) ends its run on WHN.
- 22 December: An American in England ends its run on network radio (CBS).

== Births ==
- 7 August: Garrison Keillor, American public radio host of A Prairie Home Companion.
- 12 August: David Munrow, English early music performer and presenter (Pied Piper on BBC Radio 3) (suicide 1976).
- 29 August: Larry Monroe, 29-year veteran with KUT in Austin, Texas (d. 2014).
- 20 September: Dan Davis, American radio personality on ESPN Radio.
- 24 October: Frank Delaney, Irish-born novelist and radio presenter (d. 2017).
- 11 December: Bud Ballou, American disc jockey and radio personality during the 1960s and 1970s (d. 1977).
- 24 December: Anthony Clare, Irish-born psychiatrist and BBC radio presenter (d. 2007).
- 26 December: Emperor Rosko (Mike Pasternak), American disc jockey on both sides of the Atlantic.
- Bill Brown, New York City television and radio personality (WCBS-FM, WPLJ, WNEW-FM).
