= Asia Pacific Poker Tour season 2 results =

Below are the results of the second season of the Asia Pacific Poker Tour. All currencies are US dollars unless otherwise stated.

== Events ==
=== APPT Macau ===
- Casino: Grand Waldo Hotel & Casino
- Buy-in: HK$25,000 (US$3,200)
- 6-Day Event: Monday, September 1, 2008 to Saturday, September 6, 2008
- Number of buy-ins: 538
- Total Prize Pool: $1,620,897
- Number of Payouts: 56
- Winning Hand: K♦ J♦

Final Table
Place	Name	Prize
1st	(United States) Edward Sabat	HK$3,540,040 (US$453,851)
2nd	(Malaysia) Charles Chua	HK$2,275,740 (US$291,761)
3rd	(Singapore) Diwei Huang	HK$1,201,080 (US$153,984)
4th	(Sweden) Mikael Rosen	HK$847,080 (US$108,600)
5th	(Denmark) Jeppe Drivsholm	HK$632,150 (US$81,044)
6th	(Macau) Kuok Wai Will Cheong	HK$442,500 (US$56,730)
7th	(United States) Tian Chen	HK$328,720 (US$42,143)
8th	(United Kingdom) Javed Abrahams	HK$240,220 (US$30,797)
9th	(South Korea) So Myung-Sim	HK$177,000 (US$22,692)

=== (South Korea) APPT Seoul ===
- Casino: Paradise Walker-Hill Casino
- Buy-in: ₩3,000,000 ($2,870)
- 3-Day Event: Friday, September 26, 2008 to Sunday, September 28, 2008
- Number of buy-ins: 165
- Total Prize Pool: ₩465,300,000 (US$400,622)
- Number of Payouts: 16
- Winning Hand: 9♥ 2♣

Final Table
Place	Name	Prize
1st	(Japan) Yoshihiro Tasaka	₩148,896,000 ($128,199)
2nd	(Japan) Hidenari Shiono	₩93,060,000 ($80,125)
3rd	(Canada) Brian Kang	₩51,183,000 ($44,069)
4th	(Singapore) Fam Kai Yat	₩37,224,000 ($32,050)
5th	(Japan) Yuji Masaki	₩30,244,500 ($26,041)
6th	(United States) Dan Schreiber	₩23,265,000 ($20,031)
7th	(Hungary) David Horvath	₩18,612,000 ($16,025)
8th	(Canada) Daniel Williams	₩13,959,000 ($12,019)
9th	(Canada) Sam Faqiryar	₩9,306,000 ($8,012)

=== (New Zealand) APPT Auckland ===
- Casino: Skycity Casino
- Buy-in: NZ$2,800 (US$1,860)
- 4-Day Event: Friday, October 9, 2008 to Monday, October 12, 2008
- Number of buy-ins: 306
- Total Prize Pool: NZ$856,800 (US$511,060)
- Number of Payouts: 32
- Winning Hand: 2♥ 2♣

Final Table
Place	Name	Prize
1st	(New Zealand) Daniel Craker	NZ$257,040 (US$169,999)
2nd	(Australia) Matthew Konnecke	NZ$162,791 (US$107,785)
3rd	(New Zealand) Wang Jung	NZ$85,680 (US$56,666)
4th	(New Zealand) Dan Sing	NS$59,976 (US$39,666)
5th	(New Zealand) Luke Stanford	NZ$46,267 (US$30,600)
6th	(Singapore) Nathanael Seet	NZ$34,272 (US$22,667)
7th	(Finland) Jani Karke	NZ$25,704 (US$17,000)
8th	(Australia) Michael Mariakis	NZ$19,706 (US$13,033)
9th	(England) Wai Yuen	NZ$14,565 (US$9,633)

=== (Philippines) APPT Manila ===
- Casino: Hyatt Hotel & Casino Manila
- Buy-in: ₱100,000 ($2,350)
- 4-Day Event: Thursday, November 13, 2008 to Sunday, November 16, 2008
- Number of buy-ins: 285
- Total Prize Pool: ₱26,790,000 ($542,856)
- Number of Payouts: 32
- Winning Hand: 9♦ 7♦

Final Table
Place	Name	Prize
1st	(Australia) Van Marcus	₱8,037,000 ($162,856)
2nd	(South Korea) Noh Tae-jun	₱5,090,100 ($103,142)
3rd	(South Korea) Hyoung Jin-nam	₱2,679,000 ($54,285)
4th	(South Korea) Chang Yong-suk	₱1,875,300 ($37,999)
5th	(Philippines) Ramil Tandoc	₱1,446,600 ($29,314)
6th	(New Zealand) Lee Nelson	₱1,071,600 ($21,714)
7th	(Hong Kong) Manish Sansi	₱803,700 ($16,285)
8th	(Philippines) Benjie Lim	₱616,170 ($12,485)
9th	(Philippines) Rainier Aquino	₱455,430 ($9,228)

=== (Australia) APPT Sydney ===
- Casino: Star City Casino
- Buy-in: A$6,300 (US$4,725)
- 6-Day Event: Tuesday, December 2, 2008 to Sunday, December 7, 2008
- Number of buy-ins: 477
- Total Prize Pool: A$2,800,000 (US$1,867,079)
- Number of Payouts: 48
- Winning Hand: A♣ Q♥

Final Table
Place	Name	Prize
1st	(Australia) Martin Rowe	A$1,000,000 (US$648,046)
2nd	(Australia) Jason Gray	A$476,000 (US$308,470)
3rd	(Canada) Tony Basile	A$266,000 (US$172,380)
4th	(Australia) Antonio Fazzolari	A$182,000 (US$117,944)
5th	(Australia) Timothy English	A$140,000 (US$90,726)
6th	(Australia) Frank Saffioti	A$100,800 (US$65,323)
7th	(Poland) Daniel Kowalski	A$72,800 (US$47,178)
8th	(Australia) Hai Bo Chu	A$53,200 (US$35,530)
9th	(Australia) Tom Rafferty	A$39,000 (US$25,274)
