= Jeremy Cordeaux =

Australian radio and television presenter (born 1945)

Jeremy Cordeaux AM
- Born: Jeremy Nicholas Cordeaux; 18 September 1945 (age 81); Sydney, New South Wales, Australia
- Occupations: Radio and television presenter
- Years active: 1962–2021

Jeremy Nicholas Cordeaux AM (born 18 September 1945) is an Australian radio and television presenter best known for his work in the talkback radio format.

Cordeaux worked in radio from 1962 to 2021, rising from runner, to presenter and host, to managing director of a radio station. Cordeaux was the host of the Australian TV dating show Blind Date in 1970 and co-anchored the Adelaide edition of Seven News in the late 1980s. His career has also been marred by controversy, from implication in a cash-for-comment affair in 1999, to two DUI charges, to his 2021 sacking for on-air comments about alleged rape victim Brittany Higgins.

Cordeaux has been named Best Talk Show Host in the World three times, and has been inducted into the Australian Commercial Radio Hall of Fame. In 2003, Cordeaux was made a Knight of the Order of St. John (KStJ) for services to broadcasting and the community and, in 2006, he was made a Member of the Order of Australia (AM).

== Career ==
=== Radio work ===
Born in Sydney, Cordeaux began his career in radio during 1962, at the age of 16, when he became an errand boy for John Laws at 2GB.

He later moved to Grafton to work at 2GF before a 12-month stint at 2KY in Sydney, returning to 2GB in 1973 to take over the morning show. Cordeaux then became the station's breakfast presenter in 1974.

In 1976, Cordeaux moved to Adelaide. There he hosted The Court of Public Opinion on 5DN for almost thirty years.

After acquiring a 10% interest in 5DN, he was promoted to the position of Managing Director. He later sold his interest in 5DN, and purchased 5AD and 5SE from Hoyts Media. He sold the stations to the Australian Radio Network in 1996.

Cordeaux retired from 5DN in 2004. He returned to radio in 2014, commencing work with FIVEaa.

In December 2016, Cordeaux announced he was leaving FIVEaa, after mistakenly believing the station wanted him to move to another timeslot to replace Alan Hickey, assuming Hickey's employment was being terminated. However, after being informed that Hickey was leaving the station to undergo cancer treatment, Cordeaux elected to stay.

Cordeaux was sacked by FIVEaa in March 2021 following on-air comments about alleged rape victim Brittany Higgins.

=== Television work ===
Cordeaux's best known television role was as host of Australian dating show Blind Date in 1970.

In the late 1980s, Cordeaux anchored the Adelaide edition of Seven News, alongside Graeme Goodings.

He also hosted his own show on Adelaide community station in the early 2010s on Channel 44.

Cordeaux was a guest on ABC Television's weekly panel show Q&A in 2013.

=== Charity work ===
Cordeaux was the founding chairperson of the Variety Club of South Australia, and has been associated with the Royal Institute for Deaf and Blind Children, the Motor Neurone Disease Association, Red Cross, SA Great and The Smith Family.

== Cash for comment affair ==
In 1999, Cordeaux was implicated in the cash for comment affair when ABC Television's Media Watch program aired allegations by former 5AD news director Neil Wiese. Wiese claimed he had been pressured to tailor news bulletins to incorporate an endorsement deal for 5AD's advertisers in 1993, which guaranteed them undisclosed and subtle preferential treatment during general on air programs and news bulletins. Media Watch cited a letter of complaint Wiese had sent to the Australian Broadcasting Authority, and a memo allegedly outlining the deal which claimed the station would have sought to create "industry authority status" for the businesses through news bulletins and program segments. Media Watch criticised the Australian Broadcasting Authority for its lack of interest in the matter, and for their lack of action regarding a "serious deficiency" with the radio industry's code of practice.

The Australian Broadcasting Authority subsequently announced it would investigate the claims made against Cordeaux on Media Watch.

In response, Cordeaux said Wiese was a former employee who had been terminated for dishonesty, and who had orchestrated a "ten-year campaign of venom and vindictiveness", and who had since been employed by the ABC. Cordeaux said he had never done anything wrong. Cordeaux later said the memo was an internal document which originated from a "think tank" discussion, and the endorsement deal outlined in the memo never eventuated.

However, following the Australian Broadcasting Authority's investigation, Cordeaux was found to have substantially breached the industry's code of practice. The ABC found Cordeaux's undisclosed personal sponsorship deals with the likes of Adelaide Casino, Network Ten, GIO and Optus had influenced the content on his programs. The ABA found 5AD to have breached the codes of practice on twelve occasions, prompting another enquiry into both 5AD and 5DN. In response, Cordeaux rejected his actions were "cash for comment", saying it was advertising rather than commenting.

Cordeaux later said in a 2004 interview that there was nothing covert about the relationship he had with the businesses as everyone had known about his close association with the sponsors. He said although the rules changed, he was not breaking any rules in place at the time. However, he said he applauded the ABA for the changes as they require announcers to be more transparent, removing any ambiguity.

== Personal life ==
=== Drunk driving ===
In May 2017, Cordeaux was convicted after pleading guilty to one count of driving with excess blood alcohol. He had recorded a reading of 0.102 during a breath test on 15 December 2016, while returning from a Christmas party. Cordeaux was issued with an immediate loss of licence for a period of six months. The magistrate recorded a conviction and fined Cordeaux $950. Cordeaux was ordered to pay $520 in court costs.

The conviction and punishment were handed down in Cordeaux's absence, as he had failed to attend the court appearance at Adelaide Magistrates Court. He later complained about not knowing about the scheduling of the court proceedings, and said he had expected someone from South Australia Police to inform him when he was due to appear.

Cordeaux faced a similar drink driving charge in 2005, after he allegedly recorded a blood alcohol reading of 0.085 during a random breath test in late 2004.

=== Vintage car collection ===
Cordeaux is known for his collection of vintage and classic cars, which he keeps in a purpose-built showroom, collectively valued at approximately $2 million.

In 2011, Cordeaux was involved in a legal dispute with Vartzokas Constructions over leaks in his custom-built showroom.

=== Dog killing incident ===
In July 1995, Cordeaux's two Jack Russell Terriers "Bollie" and "Bellini" were killed by an Angora goat breeder Peter Dansie, who claimed the dogs had killed two goats and injured ten others on his property. The man claimed he used a rabbiting knife to kill the two dogs, but would have shot them had he had a gun.

== Honours ==
Cordeax won a Walkley Award in 1984 for Best Current Affairs Report for "Conversation with William Miller".

He won three Gold Medals from the International Radio Festival of New York in 1987, 1988 and 1989 for Best Talk Show Host in the World.

Cordeaux became a Member of the Order of Australia (AM) on 12 June 2006, in recognition for his service to the broadcasting industry, and for his support of various charitable organisations.

He was inducted into the Commercial Radio Hall of Fame at the 2015 Australian Commercial Radio Awards.

In 2003 Cordeaux was made a Knight of the Order of St John (KStJ) for services to broadcasting and the community.
