= Sounds (TV series) =

- Genre: Pop music
- Created by: Graham Webb
- Presented by: Graham Webb; Donnie Sutherland
- Country of origin: Australia
- Original language: English
- No. of seasons: 14

Production
- Executive producer: Graham Webb
- Producer: Les Cook (1976–1980)
- Production locations: Sydney, New South Wales, Australia
- Running time: 3 hours

Original release
- Network: Seven Network
- Release: 1974 – December 1987

Related
- Graham Webb's Saturday Today Show; Saturday Morning Live

Sounds, originally broadcast as Sound Unlimited, is an Australian television series featuring pop and rock music, live performances, music videos and interviews. It was broadcast on Saturday mornings, from 9 a.m. for three hours, on the Seven Network beginning in late 1974 to end in December 1987. For most of its run it was hosted by former disc jockey, Donnie Sutherland. It is often credited as the first of its kind in the world, created because Australia was too far away for artists to travel to for live performances.

== History ==
Sounds began as Sounds Unlimited in late 1974, just before its long-time rival, the ABC's Countdown. The show's producer, and original host, was the former commercial radio DJ Graham "Spider" Webb. Initially, it was broadcast as Graham Webb Saturday Today Show on Channel 7 in Sydney only. Webb handed the compère position to the former 1960s pop singer and 1970s DJ, Donnie Sutherland. Jeffrey James was a co-compère with Webb and later with Sutherland but left the show.

Sounds Unlimited (initially without the plural) was the first live studio programme broadcast in colour in Australia from 1 March 1975. Many local and international music artists appeared on the show. By May 1978 it was screened on 21 stations across the country. According to Sutherland, "When colour was starting, families would be in the shopping centres on Saturday morning and they would see our show – and a lot of our material was in colour. Not only did that help sell sets, but it also established Sound Unlimited in people's minds." It broadcast the final public appearance, on 30 September 1978, of Australian rock'n'roller, Johnny O'Keefe, who died a week later, on 6 October.

The show was broadcast from a hangar in Rutherford NSW using NBN 3 OB facilities late 1970s

The theme song for the show was "Love's Theme", by Barry White's Love Unlimited Orchestra.

== See also ==
- 1975 in television
- List of Australian music television shows
