= Blind Date (radio series) =

1943-1946 old-time radio program

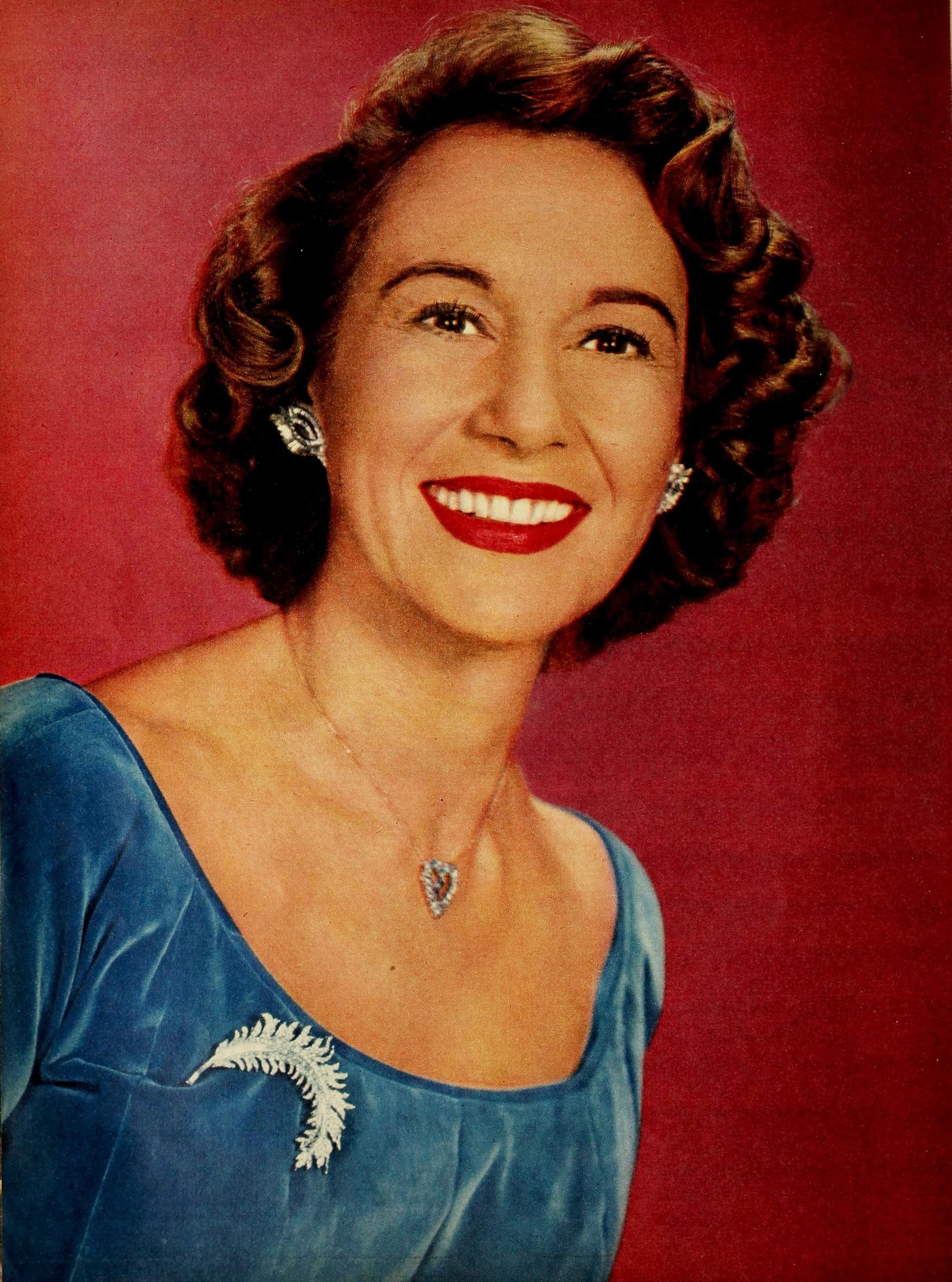
- Arlene Francis, host of Blind Date
- Genre: Dating game show
- Running time: 30 minutes
- Country of origin: United States
- Language: English
- Syndicates: NBC
- Starring: Arlene Francis
- Announcer: Jimmy Wallington
- Directed by: Tom Wallace
- Produced by: Tom Wallace
- Original release: July 8, 1943 – January 18, 1946
- Sponsored by: Hinds Honey and Almond Cream

Blind Date is an old-time radio program in the United States. It was broadcast on NBC from July 8, 1943 until January 18, 1946.

== Origin ==
The program was derived from a similar show, G. I. Blind Date, that was broadcast on KELO in Sioux Falls, South Dakota. That program was adapted into a summer replacement for the Fanny Brice-Frank Morgan show (Maxwell House Coffee Time). General Foods was the sponsor.

== Format ==
Listeners to Blind Date heard "a simple, old-fashioned pattern — that of a young man trying to talk himself into the good graces of a girl". Each episode featured six servicemen selected from the studio audience. Those six were grouped into three pairs. A telephone provided the only contact between the two men in a pair and a "glamour girl", (usually a model or an actress) as a partition separated the men from the women. Each man had two minutes to convince the young woman that she should go on a date with him. Each winner received $5 in cash, a corsage to give to his date, and a post-program date with her at a night club. The three men who lost received consolation prizes, usually $15 and tickets to Broadway plays. The couples' dates to the night club were chaperoned by the show's producers or by celebrities, including actress Elissa Landi, actor Robert Walker, and bandleader Benny Goodman.

When the program was in New York City, the dating couples went to the Stork Club, and by January 1945, the table reserved for the couples had "become something of an institution at the Stork Club". When it originated from Hollywood, couples went to the Earl Carroll restaurant.

== Personnel and production ==
Arlene Francis was the host of Blind Date. Jimmy Wallington was the announcer, and Arnold Johnson directed the orchestra. Tom Wallace produced and directed the show. Young women who dated the winners included Phyllis Creore, Virginia Mayo, Dorothy Hart and Frances Heflin. The women received $50 each for participating. The contract between the show and its sponsor required that the young women go home without their escorts, but they were not prevented from getting back in touch with each other later. By late January 1945, Three marriages had resulted from the dates. Blind Date was sponsored by Hinds Honey and Almond Cream.

The program usually originated from the Ritz Theater in New York City, but it occasionally went to other sites, including Boston, where it was first presented as a stage show, part of a vaudeville program at the RKO Boston Theatre. One episode was broadcast from Madison Square Garden as part of a "great war bond rally" in November 1944.

== Critical reception ==
The radio show began its network run as a summer replacement for the Maxwell House Coffee Time program, and it was fairly risqué for its time. The Billboard review for the first show concluded with, "All in all, it's a lot of fun and if program could be broadcast 'for adults only' it'd be a great filler inner for Snooks and Frank Morgan. Since broadcasting is a family medium it doesn't belong on the air."

== Local adaptations ==
As Blind Date became popular on radio, some communities began to adapt the concept for local stage-show productions with local servicemen and young women in roles similar to those on the program. Places that had such presentations included Johnson City, Tennessee; and Shreveport, Louisiana.
