= Asia Pacific Poker Tour season 4 results =

Below are the results of the fourth season of the Asia Pacific Poker Tour. All currencies are US dollars unless otherwise stated.

== Events ==
=== (Philippines) APPT Manila ===
- Casino: Hyatt Hotel & Casino Manila
- Buy-in: $2,700
- 6-Day Event: Mar 20-25, 2010
- Number of buy-ins: 430
- Total Prize Pool: $1,042,750
- Number of Payouts: 52

Final Table
Place	Name	Prize
1st	(United States) Binh Nguyen	$260,700
2nd	(United Kingdom) Gordon Huntly	$166,800
3rd	(Malaysia) Charles Chua	$93,850
4th	(Hong Kong) Terrence Chan	$71,500
5th	(South Korea) Sunny Jung	$54,700
6th	(Singapore) Choon Kwang Lim	$44,300
7th	(United States) Victor Chang	$33,900
8th	(Philippines) Kirby Te	$26,600
9th	(Chinese Taipei) Jackal Lee	$19,800

=== (Macau) APPT Macao ===
- Casino: Casino Grand Lisboa
- Buy-in: 37,600+2,400 HKD (5,160 USD)
- 6-Day Event: May 18–23, 2010
- Number of buy-ins: 342
- Total Prize Pool: $1,639,372
- Number of Payouts: 40

Final Table
Place	Name	Prize
1st	(United States) Victorino Torres	$418,026
2nd	(China) 'John' Wing Chong	$268,880
3rd	(New Zealand) Cole Swannack	$151,644
4th	(Denmark) Jeppe Drivsholm	$114,738
5th	(Denmark) Kenny Nielsen	$90,142
6th	(Costa Rica) Brian Green	$73,775
7th	(Norway) Kai Paulsen	$57,382
8th	(United States) Albert Kim	$45,084
9th	(England) Keith 'The Camel' Hawkins	$32,787

=== (New Zealand) APPT Auckland ===
- Casino: Skycity Casino
- Buy-in: 3,250 NZD ($2,275)
- 5-Day Event: Sep 15-19, 2010
- Number of buy-ins: 218
- Total Prize Pool: NZ$654,000
- Number of Payouts: 24

Final Table
Place	Name	Prize
1st	(New Zealand) Danny 'Brotha D' Leaoasavaii	NZ$170,000
2nd	(Australia) Tom Grigg	NZ$107,900
3rd	(New Zealand) Srdjan Mitrovic	NZ$60,500
4th	(Australia) Danny Silk	NZ$49,050
5th	(Hungary) Tamas Lendvai	NZ$40,900
6th	(New Zealand) Ropati Toleafoa	NZ$34,400
7th	(Spain) Santi Soriano Ramos	NZ$27,800
8th	(United States) Noah Vogleman	NZ$21,250
9th	(Australia) Leo Boxell	NZ$16,350

=== (Philippines) APPT Cebu ===
- Casino: Shangri-La Mactan Resort & Spa
- Buy-in: 100,000 PHP (2,165 USD)
- 5-Day Event: Nov 12-16, 2010
- Number of buy-ins: 239
- Total Prize Pool: PHP 21,518,480 (approx US$490,170)
- Number of Payouts: 28

Final Table
Place	Name	Prize
1st	(South Korea) Young-shin Im	PHP 5,810,000
2nd	(Australia) Fabiano Michael	PHP 3,660,000
3rd	(South Korea) Kim Gap Young	PHP 2,045,000
4th	(Sweden) Mikael Rosen	PHP 1,560,000
5th	(Malaysia) Daren Yoon	PHP 1,290,000
6th	(United States) Basilios Diakokomninos	PHP 1,025,000
7th	(Sweden) Jukka Juvonen	PHP 805,000
8th	(Canada) Richard En	PHP 645,000
9th	(Australia) Raymond Lapitan	PHP 485,480

=== (Australia) APPT Sydney ===
- Casino: Star City Casino
- Buy-in: 6,300 A$ ($5,650)
- 6-Day Event: Dec 7-12, 2010
- Number of buy-ins: 289
- Total Prize Pool: A$1,734,000
- Number of Payouts: 32

Final Table
Place	Name	Prize
1st	(Australia) Jonathan Karamalikis	A$459,510
2nd	(Australia) Ben McLean	A$294,780
3rd	(Australia) Tom Rafferty	A$164,730
4th	(Australia) Peco Stojanovski	A$121,380
5th	(France) Antoine Amourette	A$97,970
6th	(United States) Eddy Sabat	A$79,765
7th	(Australia) Manuel Hansimikali	A$65,025
8th	(United Kingdom) Roland De Wolfe	A$50,285
9th	(Canada) Daniel Negreanu	A$36,415
