= &FRIENDS Festival =

Music and pop culture festival in the Philippines

- Status: Active
- Genre: EDM, Pop, Hip hop
- Venue: Okada Manila
- Locations: Parañaque, Metro Manila, Philippines
- Years active: 2025–present
- Founders: Justin Banusing (Clouted)
- Website: andfriends.live

&FRIENDS Festival is a music and pop culture festival held in Parañaque, Metro Manila, Philippines. The festival features electronic dance music concerts, gaming events, and content creator conventions. Clouted, a company led by CEO Justin Banusing, organizes the event. It uses multiple stages for international headliners, regional Asian artists, and local Filipino talent.

== History ==
=== Inaugural Festival (May 2025) ===
The first &FRIENDS Festival took place on May 30 and 31, 2025, at Okada Manila. In January 2025, organizers announced that Zedd would headline the event. Later that month, they confirmed Canadian rapper bbno$ as the headliner for the second night. Zedd's performance was his first in the Philippines in three years while bbno$'s performance was his first ever in the Philippines.

The event combined music, gaming, and creator culture. The festival used different areas within the hotel complex, including the Cove Manila and the Crystal Pavilion. The lineup had over 50 artists. Illenium made his Manila performance debut at the event. Girls' Generation member Hyoyeon (DJ HYO) also performed. The festival also had an OPM Spotlight for Filipino musicians. Performers included Ylona Garcia, Amiel Sol, and Kiyo.

=== Halloween Festival (October 2025) ===
A second edition, called the &FRIENDS Halloween Festival, happened on October 31, 2025 at Okada Manila. Reports described the event as a mix of a festival and a destination wedding. The lineup featured Asian electronic music artists, including Knock2, Dabin, Beauz, and Sabai.

=== Festival 2026 (June 2026) ===
A third edition, called the &FRIENDS Festival 2026, is scheduled to happen on June 19 and 20, 2026 at Okada Manila. Its lineup features electronic music artists, headlined by Galantis, Porter Robinson, Subtronics, and Yellow Claw.

== Program and facilities ==
The festival uses multiple stages and areas

- Cove Stage: The main stage for headline acts.
- Creator Stage: A stage for panels, K-Pop raves, and local OPM artists
- Friendship Stage: An area for DJ collectives and Asian underground music

The event also hosts a "Creator Expo" with internet personalities. Guests have included VTubers Ironmouse and Shoto, along with gamers and lifestyle vloggers. The venue includes space for cosplay and merchandise booths.

== Reception ==
Billboard Philippines reviewed the first festival. The review noted the crowd's interest in EDM but mentioned logistical issues. It cited long walking times between stages and limited food options. Rappler wrote that the event allowed attendees to experience music, gaming, and Internet culture together.

Justin Banusing, the CEO of the organizer, said the event aimed to "merge global energy with local culture." Reports stated that international visitors made up more than one-third of the attendees of the Halloween edition.
