= Phyllis Jeanne Creore =

American singer and actress

Phyllis Jeanne Creore (March 21, 1916 - October 3, 2016) was an American singer and actress in the era of old-time radio.

== Early years ==
Creore was born on March 21, 1916, in Rochester, New York. the daughter of Alvin Creore and Florence Geneva Smith Creore. She had one sibling. Growing up, she participated in activities of Monroe Avenue Methodist Church's Epworth League, including acting in plays.

In her youth, Creore was confined to bed for several weeks as she healed from injuries sustained when a vehicle hit her while she was riding her bicycle. During that time, she entertained herself by using her father's old guitar to write songs, creating both lyrics and music even though she could not read music. Later, a friend listened to her sing and play her compositions and transcribed them on manuscript paper.

She graduated from Monroe High School in Rochester, New York.

== Career ==
Creore gained early experience by singing on WHAM radio in Rochester and with Bobby Lyons's orchestra.

In 1937, she moved to New York City to progress in her career, living at the Rehearsal Club with other job-seeking entertainers. Her efforts to obtain a job singing on radio were fruitless until a stop at the NBC studios provided an audition with John B. Gambling. She began performing on his Musical Clock Hour on WOR, using the stage name Phyllis Fane. Later in 1937 she became a featured singer in Montreal, performing with Lloyd Huntley's orchestra at the Mount Royal Hotel. She also toured with the Huntley orchestra, and she acted in summer stock theater in Gloucester, Massachusetts.

By 1938, Creore had begun acting on radio in addition to singing. The "low, vibrant quality of her speaking voice" led to her obtaining regular parts in radio shows and making guest appearances on other programs, including multiple appearances on The Fred Allen Show. In May 1938, she was a student in Paramount Pictures' dramatic school in preparation for possible work in films.

Creore was Miss Television at the 1939 New York World's Fair, demonstrating TV to fair attendees. As she interviewed people in a garden outside the RCA exhibit, coaxial-cable connections enabled audiences of more than 400 people to watch the interviews indoors on 20 TV sets. She co-starred in Hollywood Dreams, a twice-weekly daytime program that debuted on May 28, 1940, on CBS radio. The program focused on a "movie-struck girl, who works as waitress in a resort hotel to raise funds for a trip to Hollywood".

Beginning on August 28, 1942, Creore starred in Canteen Girl, a radio program that was "designed to raise the spirits of members of the armed services". A 2016 report on NBC described the show as "essentially a home-cooked counter-punch to the infamous 'Tokyo Rose' broadcasts airing Japanese propaganda and anti-American rhetoric during the war."

The 15-minute program was broadcast on Fridays at 6:30 p.m. Eastern Time on NBC's Red Network. It featured dramatic monologues and popular songs by Creore, based on her experiences as she volunteered once a week at the Stage Door Canteen in New York City, serving refreshments to servicemen and dancing with them. Domestic broadcasts of the program were supplemented by shortwave transmissions to troops overseas. She wrote the words and music for "This Is My Wish", the show's theme song, the lyrics of which began, "I wish you luck in everything you do, that all your cares will disappear from view . . ."

Military men wrote letters to Creore, such as one that said, "The gang really enjoys hearing you act those 'skits', and believe me when I say, 'you make them feel as if their own girl was talking to them'". A seaman wrote, "I'm in the hospital, and it [the program] makes me feel like I am at a canteen, if you know what I mean." Creore sometimes read such letters on the air, and she kept them in scrapbooks that were with her in her Fifth Avenue apartment when she died.

Other radio programs on which Creore had lead roles included Are You a Missing Heir?, Against the Storm, Aunt Jenny, Big Sister, Listen, America, Maudie's Diary, and Melodies at Midday. She also acted on television, appearing on 40 TV programs before February 1945.

The New-York Historical Society included a short film about Creore in a 2012 exhibit about New York City in World War II.

== Personal life and death ==
Creore married film producer Ted Westerman in 1946, and they had a daughter. After World War II, she became an artist, creating paintings and sculptures. Creore died on October 3, 2016, in Mount Sinai Hospital in Manhattan, aged 100.
