= Canteen Girl =

American musical radio program

Canteen Girl is an American musical radio program designed for military personnel that debuted on NBC on August 28, 1942, and ran until World War II ended. It was also broadcast overseas by shortwave radio.

Phyllis Jeanne Creore created the program based on her experiences serving refreshments to, and dancing with, military men one night a week at the Stage Door Canteen canteen in New York City. She took a sample script to executives at NBC, and the result was a popular program. Creore performed dramatic monologues and popular songs. She answered requests, dedicating songs to the military people who asked for them. In contrast to programs by Tokyo Rose, whose broadcasts of popular music were accompanied by propaganda slanted toward the Japanese, Canteen Girl "offered a young woman's all-American voice telling an uplifting story and singing".

Episodes began with an announcer saying, "Here is your Canteen Girl, Phyllis Jeanne", after which Creore sang the theme song. Creore speculated that her last name was omitted because it was difficult to pronounce. In addition to answering musical requests, she told soldiers that she wanted them to stay safe and write letters to her. They responded, with letters coming from troops stationed both overseas and in the United States. Some soldiers' family members also wrote to her. Creore kept the letters, which she described as "flattering and touching and a part of history", in scrapbooks until she died. She sent pictures in reply when they were requested, sometimes becoming "the pinup girl for whole camps". Comments in letters sent to the program included "I'm in the hospital, and it makes me feel like I am at a canteen, if you know what I mean" and "The gang really enjoys hearing you act those 'skits,' and believe me when I say, 'You make them feel as if their own girl was talking to them'".

Songs heard on the program included "Blue Skies", "My Devotion", "This Is Worth Fighting For", "When You're a Long, Long Way From Home", "Lullaby of Broadway", "I Met Him on Monday", and "There'll Never Be Another You". Canteen Girl was broadcast from 6:30 to 6:45 p. m. Eastern War Time on Fridays. Neal Hopkins wrote the scripts, and Creore wrote words and music for the show's theme, "This Is My Wish". Eddie Dunham was the director.

== Critical response ==
A review of the premiere episode in the trade publication Variety noted that the show was obviously intended to "bid for a general audience" beyond the target group of soldiers. The review said, "Miss Creore's performance was excellent, particularly her singing", the show's ballads were pleasant, and one dramatic monologue was effective. It described the second monologue as "daytime serial hokum".
