= Asia Pacific Poker Tour =

Poker tour held in the Asia–Pacific

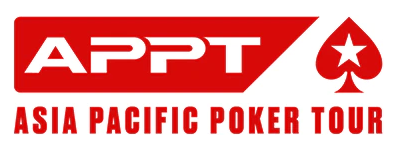
- Sport: Texas Hold 'em
- Founded: 2007
- CEO: Danny McDonagh
- Country: Australia; China; Macau; New Zealand; Philippines; South Korea; Taiwan
- Website: appt.com

Old logo used prior to 2018

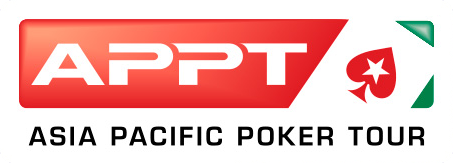
Old logo used from 2018 to 2021

The Asia Pacific Poker Tour (APPT) is a major international series of poker tournaments established in 2007 and hosted in cities across the Asia Pacific. Along with other major tours such as the European Poker Tour and Latin American Poker Tour, the Asia Pacific Poker Tour is sponsored by PokerStars.

== Format ==
The first season ran from August to December 2007 with five events held across four locations: Manila (Philippines); Seoul (South Korea); Macau (China); and Sydney (Australia). The second season runs from September to December 2008 with six events held across five locations: Macau (China); Seoul (South Korea); Auckland (New Zealand); Manila (Philippines); and Sydney (Australia). The third season was held with events held in the same locations as 2008, with the substitution of Cebu for Manila in the Philippines. In 2014 the eighth season was played.

Since season three, PokerNews.com and PokerStars.tv have provided intensive online reporting, including video coverage by presenters Lynn Gilmartin, Kristy Arnett, Sarah Grant and Nicki Pickering.

The Asia Pacific Poker Tour (APPT) is responsible for bringing the first major government-sanctioned real-money Texas hold 'em poker tournaments to Korea and China. The PokerStars.net APPT Macau: Asian Poker Open in November 2007 was the first-ever poker tournament in Macau. With 352 entrants, it was also the largest poker tournament in Asia (a November 2006 event in Singapore held the previous record with 313 entrants). With 538 entrants APPT Macau 2008 was the largest poker tournament in Asia, however, that record is currently held by 2014 APPT Beijing Millions, which saw a record 2,732 players compete for ¥7,376,400 (US$1,195,647) in prize money. While the 'Millions' tournaments played out under the APPT brand, they are considered separate tournament series from the regular APPT events, as they do not run annually.

The largest APPT Main Event field record was set at the 2018 APPT Manila, which saw Singapore's Wilson Lim defeat a 1,364-strong field to claim the ₱12,970,000 (US$244,815) top prize, with the total prize pool coming in at ₱65,492,460 (US$1,236,204).

== Tournament results ==
All prizes are listed in US dollars.

=== Season 1 ===
| Date/Local | Event/Buy-in | Entires | Prize Pool | Winner | Prize | Results |
|---|---|---|---|---|---|---|
| 24-26 Aug 2007; Hyatt Manila, Manila, Philippines | APPT Philippines U$2,500 | 255 | U$599,250 | (United States) Brett Parise | U$179,775 | |
| 28-30 Sep 2007; Sheraton Walker-Hill Hotel, Seoul, South Korea | (South Korea) APPT Korea U$2,500 | 185 | U$432,729 | (Israel) Ziv Bachar | U$139,872 | |
| 22-27 Nov 2007; Grand Waldo, Taipa, Macau | APPT Macau U$2,500 | 352 | U$809,600 | (England) Dinh Doat Le | U$222,640 | |
| 13-16 Dec 2007; The Star Sydney, Australia | (Australia) APPT Sydney Big Game Poker; Championships A$6,300 (~U$5,516) | 561 | A$2,947,074 (~U$2,580,286) | (Australia) Grant Levy | A$1,000,000 (~U$875,541) | |

=== Season 2 ===
| Date/Local | Event/Buy-in | Entires | Prize Pool | Winner | Prize | Results |
|---|---|---|---|---|---|---|
| 1-9 Sep 2008; Grand Waldo, Taipa, Macau | APPT Macau HK$25,000 (~U$3,202) | 538 | HK$12,643,000 (~U$1,619,352) | (United States) Eddy Sabat | HK$3,540,040 (~U$453,426) | |
| 26-28 Sep 2008; Paradise Walker-Hill Casino, Seoul, South Korea | (South Korea) APPT Seoul U$2,870 | 166 | U$400,622 | (Japan) Yoshihiro Tasaka | U$128,199 | |
| 9-12 Oct 2008; SkyCity Auckland, New Zealand | (New Zealand) APPT Auckland NZ$3,000 (~U$1,984) | 306 | NZ$772,728 (~U$511,060) | (New Zealand) Daniel Craker | NZ$257,040 (~U$169,999) | |
| 13-16 Nov 2008; Hyatt Manila, Manila, Philippines | (Philippines) APPT Manila ₱100,000 (~U$2,045) | 285 | ₱26,789,818 (~U$547,929) | (Australia) Van Marcus | ₱8,037,000 (~U$164,379) | |
| 2-7 Dec 2008; The Star Sydney, Australia | (Australia) APPT Sydney Big Game Poker; Championships A$6,300 (~U$3,980) | 477 | A$2,881,400 (~U$1,820,401) | (Australia) Martin Rowe | A$1,000,000 (~U$631,780) | |

=== Season 3 ===
| Date/Local | Event/Buy-in | Entires | Prize Pool | Winner | Prize | Results |
|---|---|---|---|---|---|---|
| 25-30 Aug 2009; Casino Lisboa, Sé, Macau | APPT Macau HK$40,000 (~U$5,160) | 429 | HK$16,130,400 (~U$2,081,106) | (Republic of Ireland) Dermot Blain | HK$4,194,000 (~U$541,100) | |
| 17-20 Sep 2009; 7-Luck Casino, Seoul, South Korea | (South Korea) APPT Seoul (~U$3,000) | POSTPONED; APPT Seoul 2009 has been postponed due to construction delays at the casino where they are renovating their 3rd-floor for the purpose of hosting the tournament" | | | | |
| 10-18 Oct 2009; SkyCity Auckland, New Zealand | (New Zealand) APPT Auckland NZ$3,250 (~U$2,396) | 263 | NZ$789,000 (~U$581,785) | (New Zealand) Simon Watt | NZ$209,000 (~U$154,110) | |
| 11-15 Nov 2009; Shangri-La's Mactan Resort, Cebu, Philippines | (Philippines) APPT Cebu ₱100,000 (~U$2,126) | 319 | ₱29,086,420 (~U$618,360) | (South Korea) Dong-bin Han | ₱7,410,000 (~U$157,532) | |
| 1-6 Dec 2009; The Star Sydney, Australia | (Australia) APPT Sydney Grand Final A$6,300 (~U$5,762) | 396 | A$2,376,000 (~U$2,173,038) | (Australia) Aaron Benton | A$594,000 (~U$543,260) | |

=== Season 4 ===
| Date/Local | Event/Buy-in | Entires | Prize Pool | Winner | Prize | Results |
|---|---|---|---|---|---|---|
| 20-25 Mar 2010; Manila Pavilion Hotel & Casino, Philippines | (Philippines) APPT Manila U$2,700 | 430 | U$1,042,750 | (United States) Binh Nguyen | U$260,700 | |
| 3-23 May 2010; Casino Lisboa, Sé, Macau | APPT Macau HK$40,000 (~U$5,151) | 342 | HK$12,730,608 (~U$1,639,372) | (United States) Victorino Torres | HK$3,246,200 (~U$418,026) | |
| 15-19 Sep 2010; SkyCity Auckland, New Zealand | (New Zealand) APPT Auckland NZ$3,250 (~U$2,377) | 218 | NZ$654,000 (~U$478,430) | (New Zealand) Danny Leaoasavaii | NZ$170,000 (~U$124,363) | |
| 10-16 Nov 2010; Shangri-La's Mactan Resort, Cebu, Philippines | (Philippines) APPT Cebu ₱100,000 (~U$2,309) | 236 | ₱21,518,480 (~U$496,820) | (South Korea) Vivian Im | ₱5,810,000 (~U$134,142) | |
| 7-12 Dec 2010; The Star Sydney, Australia | (Australia) APPT Sydney Grand Final A$6,300 (~U$6,228) | 289 | A$1,734,000 (~U$1,714,354) | (Australia) Jonathan Karamalikis | A$459,510 (~U$454,304) | |

=== Season 5 ===
| Date/Local | Event/Buy-in | Entires | Prize Pool | Winner | Prize | Results |
|---|---|---|---|---|---|---|
| 24 Jul-1 Ago 2011; Crown Melbourne, Australia | (Australia) APPT Melbourne A$5,000 (~U$5,340) | 260 | A$1,222,000 (~U$1,305,221) | (Australia) Leo Boxell | A$330,000 (~U$352,474) | |
| 23-28 Ago 2011; SkyCity Queenstown, NZL | ANZPT/APPT Queenstown; Snowfest NZ$3,000 (~U$2,451); APPT/ANZPT - Australia New Zealand Poker Tour | 127 | NZ$342,900 (~U$280,186) | (Germany) Marcel Schreiner | NZ$94,300 (~U$77,053) | |
| 23-27 Nov 2011; Casino Lisboa, Sé, Macau | APPT Macau HK$30,000 (~U$3,854) | 575 | HK$15,552,600 (~U$1,998,158) | (United States) Randy Lew | HK$3,772,000 (~U$484,617) | |

=== Season 6 ===
| Date/Local | Event/Buy-in | Entires | Prize Pool | Winner | Prize | Results |
|---|---|---|---|---|---|---|
| 8-11 Mar 2012; Paradise Walker-Hill Casino, Seoul, South Korea | (South Korea) APPT Seoul ₩1,240,000 (~U$1,105) | 268 | ₩717,489,600 (~U$639,571) | (United States) Andrew Kim | ₩145,000,000 (~U$129,253) | |
| 24-30 Apr 2012; Waterfront Casino, Cebu, PHI | (Philippines) APPT Cebu ₱100,000 (~U$2,345) | 246 | ₱21,953,040 (~U$514,870) | (Vietnam) Hoang Do | ₱5,927,000 (~U$139,007) | |
| 7-11 Nov 2012; Grand Waldo, Taipa, Macau | (Macau) 2012 Asia Championship of Poker (ACOP) HK$100,000 (~U$12,902) | 184 | HK$17,305,200 (~U$2,232,784) | (China) Xing Zhou | HK$3,547,500 (~U$457,712) | |

=== Season 7 ===
| Date/Local | Event/Buy-in | Entires | Prize Pool | Winner | Prize | Results |
|---|---|---|---|---|---|---|
| 14-17 Mar 2013; Paradise Walker-Hill Casino, Seoul, South Korea | (South Korea) APPT Seoul ₩3,000,000 (~U$2,738) | 222 | ₩594,338,400 (~U$542,512) | (Australia) Aaron Lim | ₩121,700,000 (~U$111,088) | |
| 1-5 May 2013; Waterfront Casino, Cebu, PHI | (Philippines) APPT Cebu ₱100,000 (~U$2,419) | 158 | ₱14,099,920 (~U$341,022) | (South Korea) Jaekyung Sim | ₱3,948,000 (~U$95,487) | |
| 12-16 Jun 2013; City of Dreams, Cotai, Macau | APPT Macau HK$25,000 (~U$3,221) | 388 | HK$8,656,280 (~U$1,115,226) | (China) Alexandre Chieng | HK$2,165,000 (~U$278,926) | |
| 30 Jul-4 Ago 2013; SkyCity Queenstown, NZL | ANZPT/APPT Queenstown; Snowfest NZ$3,000 (~U$2,419); APPT/ANZPT - Australia New Zealand Poker Tour | 126 | NZ$340,200 (~U$274,300) | (Australia) Jonathan Bredin | NZ$93,600 (~U$75,469) | |
| 5-9 Sep 2013; Crown Melbourne, Australia | (Australia) APPT Melbourne A$3,000 (~U$2,705) | 309 | A$384,300 (~U$346,482) | (Australia) Billy Argyros | A$134,500 (~U$121,264) | |
| 28 Oct-2 Nov 2013; City of Dreams, Cotai, Macau | (Macau) 2013 Asia Championship of Poker (ACOP) HK$100,000 (~U$12,896) | 203 | HK$19,800,000 (~U$2,553,382) | (South Korea) Sunny Jung | HK$4,352,000 (~U$561,228) | |

=== Season 8 ===
| Date/Local | Event/Buy-in | Entires | Prize Pool | Winner | Prize | Results |
|---|---|---|---|---|---|---|
| 2-9 Feb 2014; Crown Melbourne, Australia | (Australia) 2014 Aussie Millions Poker; Championship A$10,600 (~U$9,273) | 668 | A$6,680,000 (~U$5,843,912) | (Canada) Amichai Barer | A$1,600,000 (~U$1,399,739) | |
| 3-6 Apr 2014; Paradise Walker-Hill Casino, Seoul, South Korea | (South Korea) APPT Seoul ₩3,000,000 (~U$2,834) | 256 | ₩685,363,200 (~U$647,528) | (Thailand) Chane Kampanatsanyakorn | ₩150,000,000 (~U$141,719) | |
| 21-25 May 2014; City of Dreams, Cotai, Macau | APPT Macau HK$25,000 (~U$3,224) | 494 | HK$11,021,140 (~U$1,421,622) | (China) Liu Jiajun | HK$2,776,000 (~U$358,078) | |
| 4-7 Jul 2014; Metro Card Club, Pasig, PHI | (Philippines) APPT Manila ₱50,000 (~U$1,146) | 260 | ₱11,349,000 (~U$260,065) | (Vietnam) Ha Duong | ₱3,472,000 (~U$79,562) | |
| 18-27 Jul 2014; Star Poker Club, Beijing, China | (China) APPT Beijing Millions ¥3,000 (~U$487) | 2,732 | ¥7,376,400 (~U$1,195,647) | (China) Qin Chen | ¥675,000 (~U$109,411) | |
| 4-8 Nov 2014; City of Dreams, Cotai, Macau | (Macau) 2014 Asia Championship of Poker (ACOP) HK$100,000 (~U$12,895) | 291 | HK$27,092,100 (~U$3,493,424) | (Canada) Gabriel Le Jossec | HK$6,300,000 (~U$812,361) | |
| 19-23 Nov 2014; SkyCity Auckland, New Zealand | (New Zealand) APPT Auckland NZ$2,500 (~U$1,985) | 225 | NZ$506,250 (~U$401,952) | (Australia) Minh Hau Nguyen | NZ$111,600 (~U$88,608) | |
| 25-30 Nov 2014; Wanda Realm, Wuhan, China | 2014 CHPG Hubei Millions ¥3,000 (~U$489); CHPG-China Hubei Poker Games | CANCELLED - Translated from Chinese: After research, it was decided to cancel the "2014" origined scheduled to be held on November 25, 2014, The National Huvei Texas Holdem Poker; Tournament "CHPG Cup Hubei Million Tournament" | | | | |
| 17-21 Dec 2014; Star Poker Club, Beijing, China | (China) 2014 Beijing Cup ¥8,800 (~U$1,436) | 346 | ¥2,768,000 (~U$451,689) | (China) Yang Zhang | ¥623,125 (~U$101,683) | |

=== Season 9 ===
| Date/Local | Event/Buy-in | Entires | Prize Pool | Winner | Prize | Results |
|---|---|---|---|---|---|---|
| 25 Jan-1 Feb 2015; Crown Melbourne, Australia | (Australia) 2015 Aussie Millions Poker; Championship A$10,600 (~U$8,375) | 648 | A$6,480,000 (~U$5,120,101) | (Australia) Aristomenis Stavropoulos | A$1,385,500 (~U$1,094,737) | |
| 7-13 Mar 2015; City of Dreams, Cotai, Macau | MPC22 Macau Poker Cup HK$12,000 (~U$1,547); Guaranteed Prize P. HK$5,000,000 (~U$644,562) | 987 | HK$10,339,812 (~U$1,332,931) | (China) Yuguang Li | HK$1,848,000 (~U$238,230) | |
| 19-23 Mar 2015; The Star Sydney, Australia | ANZPT/APPT Sydney A$2,300 (~U$1,757); APPT/ANZPT-Australia New Zealand Poker Tour | 445 | A$912,250 (~U$696,821) | (Australia) Dimitrios Psaros | A$183,000 (~U$139,784) | |
| 9-12 Apr 2015; Paradise Walker-Hill Casino, Seoul, South Korea | (South Korea) APPT Seoul ₩3,000,000 (~U$2,742) | 241 | ₩645,205,200 (~U$589,654) | (United States) Jason Mo | ₩165,590,200 (~U$151,333) | |
| 27-31 May 2015; City of Dreams, Cotai, Macau | APPT Macau HK$25,000 (~U$3,225) | 493 | HK$10,998,830 (~U$1,418,739) | (Hong Kong) Tony Cheng | HK$2,525,000 (~U$325,699) | |
| 6-9 Aug 2015; City of Dreams, Manila, PHI | (Philippines) APPT Manila ₱50,000 (~U$1,095) | 585 | ₱25,535,250 (~U$559,326) | (Australia) Aaron Lim (2) | ₱6,016,250 (~U$131,780) | |
| 9-14 Nov 2015; City of Dreams, Cotai, Macau | (Macau) 2015 Asia Championship of Poker (ACOP) HK$100,000 (~U$12,900); Guaranteed Prize P. HK$15,000,000 (~U$1,935,064) | 260 | HK$24,206,000 (~U$3,122,678) | (China) Jimmy Zhou | HK$5,885,000 (~U$759,190) | |

=== Season 10 ===
| Date/Local | Event/Buy-in | Entires | Prize Pool | Winner | Prize | Results |
|---|---|---|---|---|---|---|
| 14-18 Jan 2016; City of Dreams, Cotai, Macau | 2016 Macau Millions HK$3,000 (~U$387); Guaranteed Prize Pool HK$3,000,000 (~U$386,577) | 2,343 | HK$6,136,317 (~U$790,719) | (China) Alvan Yifan Zheng | HK$911,000 (~U$117,390) | |
| 24-31 Jan 2016; Crown Melbourne, Australia | (Australia) 2016 Aussie Millions Poker; Championship A$10,600 (~U$7,420) | 732 | A$7,320,000 (~U$5,124,507) | (Canada) Alan Engel | A$1,600,000 (~U$1,120,110) | |
| 28 Feb-4 Mar 2016; City of Dreams, Cotai, Macau | MPC24 Macau Poker Cup HK$12,000 (~U$1,543); Guaranteed Prize Pool HK$8,000,000 (~U$1,028,750) | 1,075 | HK$11,261,700 (~U$1,448,184) | (Malaysia) Ying Lin Chua | HK$1,904,000 (~U$244,842) | |
| 6-8 May 2016; City of Dreams, Manila, PHI | (Philippines) APPT Manila Megastack 5 ₱25,000 (~U$528) | 478 | ₱10,432,000 (~U$220,313) | (Taiwan) Tzu Chieh Lo | ₱2,392,350 (~U$50,523) | |
| 25-29 May 2016; City of Dreams, Cotai, Macau | APPT Macau HK$25,000 (~U$3,218) | 533 | HK$11,891,230 (~U$1,530,805) | (China) Jian Sun | HK$2,249,660 (~U$289,608) | |
| 23-27 Jun 2016; Paradise Walker-Hill Casino, Seoul, South Korea | (South Korea) APPT Seoul ₩3,000,000 (~U$1,581) | 158 | ₩422,997,600 (~U$365,893) | (United States) Albert Paik | ₩119,097,600 (~U$103,019) | |
| 4-8 Aug 2016; City of Dreams, Manila, PHI | (Philippines) APPT Manila ₱50,000 (~U$1,061) | 577 | ₱25,186,050 (~U$534,475) | (Vietnam) Linh Tran | ₱6,135,000 (~U$130,191) | |
| 4-9 Sep 2016; City of Dreams, Cotai, Macau | MPC25 Macau Poker Cup HK$12,000 (~U$1,547); Guaranteed Prize Pool HK$6,000,000 (~U$773,543) | 1,145 | HK$11,995,020 (~U$1,546,444) | (England) Tom Alner | HK$2,509,000 (~U$323,469) | |
| 14-18 Oct 2016; Crown Melbourne, Australia | (Australia) APPT Melbourne A$2,300 (~U$1,736) | 523 | A$1,072,150 (~U$809,097) | (Australia) Ashish Gupta | A$235,875 (~U$178,003) | |
| 7-12 Nov 2016; City of Dreams, Cotai, Macau | (Macau) 2016 Asia Championship of Poker (ACOP) HK$100,000 (~U$12,892); Guaranteed Prize Pool HK$15,000,000 (~U$1,933,767) | 302 | HK$28,116,200 (~U$3,624,679) | (Russia) Vladimir Geshkenbein | HK$5,643,000 (~U$727,483) | |

=== Season 11 ===
| Date/Local | Event/Buy-in | Entires | Prize Pool | Winner | Prize | Results |
|---|---|---|---|---|---|---|
| 26 Jan-11 Feb 2018; City of Dreams, Cotai Macau | MPC28 Macau Poker Cup HK$15,000 (~U$1,918) | 1,122 | HK$14,692,590 (~U$1,878,687) | (China) Alvan Yifan Zheng | HK$3,055,000 (~U$390,631) | |
| 14-25 Mar 2018; City of Dreams, Cotai Macau | APPT Macau HK$40,000 (~U$5,100) | 356 | HK$12,984,032 (~U$1,655,200) | (China) Lin Wu | HK$3,095,000 (~U$394,549) | |
| 6-15 Apr 2018; Paradise Hotel & Resort, Incheon South Korea | (South Korea) APPT Korea ₩1,800,000 (~U$1,686); Guaranteed Prize Pool ₩300,000,000 (~U$280,962) | 449 | ₩705,558,600 (~U$660,784) | (Hong Kong) Michael Soyza | ₩158,700,000 (~U$148,629) | |
| 4-12 Aug 2018; Okada Manila | (Philippines) APPT Manila ₱55,000 (~U$1,038); Guaranteed Prize Pool ₱20,000,000 (~U$377,500) | 1,364 | ₱65,492,460 (~U$1,236,204) | (Singapore) Wilson Lim | ₱12,970,000 (~U$244,815) | |

=== Season 12 ===
| Date/Local | Event/Buy-in | Entires | Prize Pool | Winner | Prize | Results |
|---|---|---|---|---|---|---|
| 5-14 Apr 2019; Paradise Hotel & Resort, Incheon South Korea | (South Korea) APPT Korea ₩1,800,000 (~U$1,581); Guaranteed Prize Pool ₩300,000,000 (~U$263,565) | 581 | ₩912,983,340 (~U$802,101) | (Hong Kong) Park Yu Cheung | ₩198,100,000 (~U$174,040) | |
| 22-29 Jun 2019; Landing Casino, Jeju South Korea | (South Korea) APPT Jeju ₩2,500,000 (~U$2,158) | 362 | ₩790,065,000 (~U$681,931) | (Macau) Huidong Gu | ₩183,695,000 (~U$158,553) | |
| 26 Jul-4 Aug 2019; Okada Manila | (Philippines) APPT Manila ₱65,000 (~U$1,278); Guaranteed Prize Pool ₱20,000,000 (~U$393,359) | 1,135 | ₱64,405,575 (~U$1,266,724) | (Philippines) Florencio Campomanes | ₱11,092,500 (~U$218,166) | |

=== Season 13 ===
| Date/Local | Event/Buy-in | Entires | Prize Pool | Winner | Prize | Results |
|---|---|---|---|---|---|---|
| 31 Jan-9 Feb 2020; Asia Poker Arena CTP Poker Club Taipei Taiwan | (Taiwan) APPT Taipei NT$35,000 (~U$1,153); Guaranteed Prize Pool NT$7,500,000 (~U$247,149) | 425 | NT$12,985,800 (~U$427,925) | (Taiwan) Zong Chi He | NT$2,954,700 (~U$97,367) | |
| 31 Jul-9 Aug 2020; Okada Manila | (Philippines) APPT Manila ₱75,000 (~U$1,530); Guaranteed Prize Pool ₱20,000,000 (~U$408,000) | CANCELLED due COVID-19 | | | | |

=== Season 14 ===
| Date/Local | Event/Buy-in | Entires | Prize Pool | Winner | Prize | Results |
|---|---|---|---|---|---|---|
| 30 May-5 Jun 2022; Okada Manila | (Philippines) APPT OPEN Manila ₱40,000 (~U$760) | 464 | ₱16,120,880 (~U$306,281) | (Norway) Henrik Tollefsen | ₱3,215,900 (~U$$61,099) | |
| 29 Jul-7 Aug 2022; Okada Manila | (Philippines) APPT Manila ₱65,000 (~U$1,167); Guaranteed Prize Pool ₱20,000,000 (~U$359,220) | 801 | ₱45,452,745 (~U$816,378) | (Singapore) Xin Hua Lai | ₱5,973,000 (~U$$107,281) | |
| 3-13 Nov 2022; NagaWorld Integrated Resort Phnom Penh | APPT Cambodia U$1,500 | 378 | U$494,991 | (Canada) Alexander Puchalski | U$96,028 | |

=== Season 15 ===
| Date/Local | Event/Buy-in | Entires | Prize Pool | Winner | Prize | Results |
|---|---|---|---|---|---|---|
| 5-15 May 2023; NagaWorld Integrated Resort Phnom Penh | APPT Cambodia U$1,500; Guaranteed Prize Pool U$400,000 | 476 | U$623,322 | (Taiwan) Chao-Ting Cheng | $94,448 | |
| 27 Jul-6 Aug 2023; Okada Manila | (Philippines) APPT Manila ₱65,000 (~U$1,173); Guaranteed Prize Pool ₱20,000,000 (~U$361,048) | 1,354 | ₱76,832,730 (~U$1,387,015) | (China) Yuanning Wu | ₱11,519,730 (~U$207,959) | |

=== Season 16 ===
| Date/Local | Event/Buy-in | Entires | Prize Pool | Winner | Prize | Results |
|---|---|---|---|---|---|---|
| 24 Jul-5 Aug 2024; Cove Manila at Okada Manila | (Philippines) APPT Manila 15 ₱80,000 (~U$1,370); Guaranteed Prize Pool ₱55,000,000 (~U$1,000,000) | 1,304 | ₱91,071,360 (~U$1,560,398) | (United States) Xiong Cheng | ₱15,000,000 (~U$257,007) | |
| 18-27 Oct 2024; Coral Lounge at Okada Manila | (Philippines) APPT Championship Manila ₱165,000 (~U$3,000); Guaranteed Prize Pool ₱55,000,000 (~U$1,000,000) | 416 | ₱59,922,720 (~U$1,037,091) | (Vietnam) Trong Hieu Ngo | ₱11,610,000 (~U$200,936) | |
| 15-25 Nov 2024; NagaWorld Integrated Resort Phnom Penh | APPT Cambodia U$1,650; Guaranteed Prize Pool U$500,000 | 518 | U$746,153 | (Philippines) Christopher Mateo | U$126,500* | |

* = denote deal

=== Season 17 ===
| Date/Local | Event/Buy-in | Entires | Prize Pool | Winner | Prize | Results |
|---|---|---|---|---|---|---|
| 2-13 May 2025; NagaWorld Integrated Resort Phnom Penh | APPT Cambodia U$1,750; Guaranteed Prize Pool U$1.000,000 | 643 | U$1.000,000 | (Vietnam) Hai Ha Tran | U$155,225* | |
| 23 Jul-04 Ago 2025; Cove Manila at Okada Manila | (Philippines) APPT Manila 16 ₱80,000 (~U$1,380); Guaranteed Prize Pool ₱55,000,000 (~U$1,000,000) | 1,246 | ₱87,020,640 (~US$1,495,750) | (Philippines) Justin Ong | ₱14,800,000 (~US$256,370) | |
| 16-27 Oct 2025; Coral Lounge at Okada Manila | (Philippines) APPT Championship Manila ₱165,000 (~U$2,750); Guaranteed Prize Pool ₱60,000,000 (~U$1,000,000) | 384 | ₱60,000,000 (~US$1,027,753) | (South Korea) Minwoong Jeong | ₱11,850,000 (~US$202,981) | |
Special Events
| 19-28 Sep 2025; Coral Lounge at Okada Manila | (Philippines) APPT Championship Warm Up ₱15,000 (~U$258) | 268 | ₱3,011,472 (~US$51,877) | (South Korea) Seunghee Park | ₱710,000 (~US$12,231) | |

* denotes deal

=== Season 18 ===
| Date/Local | Event/Buy-in | Entires | Prize Pool | Winner | Prize | Results |
|---|---|---|---|---|---|---|
| 28 Jul-10 Ago 2026; Cove Manila at Okada Manila | (Philippines) APPT Manila 17 ₱80,000 (~U$1,316); Guaranteed Prize Pool ₱60,000,000 (~U$987,250) | 1,413 | ₱97,036,560 (~US$1,596,653) | (Philippines) Mike Takayama | ₱15,530,000 (~US$255,533) | |
| 3-14 Sep 2026; Paradise Hotel & Resort, Incheon South Korea | (South Korea) APPT Korea ₩1,800,000 (~U$1,334); Guaranteed Prize Pool ₩1,000,000,000 (~U$741,150) | 782 | ₩1,199,066,000 (~US$888,698) | (Japan) Hirotaka Fukatsu | ₩218,166,000 (~US$161,696) | |
| 8-16 Oct 2026; Coral Lounge at Okada Manila | (Philippines) APPT Championship Manila ₱165,000 (~U$2,618); Guaranteed Prize Pool ₱65,000,000 (~U$1,031,180) | 479 | ₱67,656,240 (~US$1,073,321) | (Netherlands) Wouter Beltz | ₱11,902,000 (~US$188,817) | |

== Winners by country ==
| Place | Country | Times |
|---|---|---|
| 1st | Australia | 14 |
| 2nd | China | 12 |
| 3rd | (United States) USA | 9 |
| 4th | South Korea | 5 |
| | Vietnam | 5 |
| 6th | Canada | 4 |
| | Philippines | 4 |
| 8th | Hong Kong | 3 |
| | New Zealand | 3 |
| | Taiwan | 3 |
| 11th | England | 2 |
| | Japan | 2 |
| | Singapore | 2 |
| 14th | Germany | 1 |
| | (Republic of Ireland) Ireland | 1 |
| | Israel | 1 |
| | Macau | 1 |
| | Malaysia | 1 |
| | Netherlands | 1 |
| | Norway | 1 |
| | Russia | 1 |
| | Thailand | 1 |
| | | 77 |

Up to Season 18 (2026) - APPT Championship Manila

== Seats at Final Tables by country ==
| Place | Country | Times |
|---|---|---|
| 1st | China | 114 |
| 2nd | Australia | 101 |
| 3rd | (United States) USA | 55 |
| 4th | Philippines | 53 |
| 5th | Japan | 40 |
| 6th | South Korea | 37 |
| 7th | New Zealand | 35 |
| 8th | Canada | 26 |
| | Taiwan | 26 |
| 10th | Singapore | 25 |
| 11th | England | 23 |
| 12th | Hong Kong | 17 |
| 13th | Vietnam | 13 |
| 14th | India | 11 |
| | Russia | 11 |
| 16th | France | 10 |
| | Germany | 10 |
| | Malaysia | 10 |
| | Netherlands | 10 |
| 20th | Sweden | 9 |
| 21st | Thailand | 7 |
| 22nd | Norway | 6 |
| 23rd | Macau | 5 |
| 24th | Israel | 4 |
| 25th | Denmark | 3 |
| | Finland | 3 |
| | (Republic of Ireland) Ireland | 3 |
| 28th | Hungary | 2 |
| | Poland | 2 |
| | Spain | 2 |
| | Switzerland | 2 |
| 32nd | Colombia | 1 |
| | Costa Rica | 1 |
| | Croatia | 1 |
| | Italy | 1 |
| | Kazakhstan | 1 |
| | Panama | 1 |
| | Scotland | 1 |
| | Slovenia | 1 |

Up to Season 18 (2026) - APPT Championship Manila

== Top 10 Prizes ==
| Rank | Event | Year | Place | Name | Prize |
|---|---|---|---|---|---|
| 1st | (Australia) APPT8 Melbourne | 2014 | 1st | (Canada) Amichai Barer | $1.399.739 |
| 2nd | (Australia) APPT10 Melbourne | 2016 | 1st | (Canada) Alan Engel | $1.120.110 |
| 3rd | (Australia) APPT9 Melbourne | 2015 | 1st | (Australia) Aristomenis Stavropoulos | $1.094.737* |
| 4th | (Australia) APPT9 Melbourne | 2015 | 2nd | (Germany) Lennart Uphoff | $959.623* |
| 5th | (Australia) APPT1 Sydney | 2007 | 1st | (Australia) Grant Levy | $875.542 |
| 6th | (Australia) APPT8 Melbourne | 2014 | 2nd | (Canada) Sorel Mizzi | $874.837 |
| 7th | APPT8 Macau | 2014 | 1st | (Canada) Gabriel Le Jossec | $812.361 |
| 8th | APPT9 Macau | 2015 | 1st | (China) Jimmy Zhou | $759.190 |
| 9th | APPT10 Macau | 2016 | 1st | (Russia) Vladimir Geshkenbein | $727.483* |
| 10th | (Australia) APPT10 Melbourne | 2016 | 2nd | (United States) Tony Dunst | $700.069 |

Up to Season 18 - APPT Championship Manila

== See also ==
- Asia Pacific Poker Tour season 1 results
- Asia Pacific Poker Tour season 2 results
- Asia Pacific Poker Tour season 3 results
- Asia Pacific Poker Tour season 4 results
