= Blind Date (Australian game show) =

- Genre: Dating Game Show; Game Show; Reality; Romance
- Based on: The Dating Game
- Presented by: Graham Webb (1967–1969); Jeremy Cordeaux (1970); Bobby Hanna (1974); Greg Evans (1991); Julia Morris (2018)
- Country of origin: Australia
- Original language: English
- No. of seasons: 7

Production
- Running time: 30 minutes; 50 minutes (2018)
- Production company: Sony Pictures Television

Original release
- Network: 0-10 Network
- Release: April 1967 – 1970
- Network: Seven Network
- Release: 1974
- Network: Network Ten
- Release: 1991
- Network: Network 10
- Release: 15 October – 19 December 2018

Blind Date is an Australian television game show which was originally based on the American series The Dating Game.

Blind Date first aired from 1967 to 1970 on the 0-10 Network (now known as Network 10). Graham Webb hosted the series from its debut to the 28 November 1969 episode. Jeremy Cordeaux hosted the show in 1970.

A 1974 version on the Seven Network was hosted by Scottish-born Bobby Hanna. A 1991 version hosted by Greg Evans was screened on Network Ten as a revived version of Perfect Match, which was also based on the same format.

A new series, termed the show's revival, began on 15 October 2018 on Channel 10, hosted by Julia Morris. It was broadcast at 7:30 pm on Mondays until the fifth episode, where it moved to the time-slot of 8:40 pm on Wednesdays.

== Format ==
Each week, a number of single Aussies who are looking for 'love', ask three questions to three potential suitors who are behind a wall (which is called the Slide-O Wall from the seventh series). Each potential suitor takes turns to answer these questions and then the contestant has to choose a date from only the potential suitor's answers and voices. The host asks the contestant, "Which contestant would you like to choose? 'Contestant number 1', 'number 2' or 'number 3'?" The contestant will choose one of these, with each number corresponding to each potential suitor, with '1' being the suitor sitting closest to the wall and number '3' being the person seated furthest.

Once the contestant chooses a suitor, they meet the two other potential mates that they did not choose. Then, the contestant and suitor ('the dates') stand on either side of the wall and, for the first time, the host reveals the suitor who is behind it by saying the suitor's name while the wall slides away to reveal them.

The dates are then given the opportunity to choose from two envelopes which contain two different dates (which are paid for by the show) that they could potentially go on. Once they choose the date, they proceed to walk up a staircase and near the top, the turn around to wave goodbye. The dates then walk away to the top of the staircase which then leads to a backstage area so that they can 'get ready' to go on their date.

In the next episode, the dates normally come back to make another appearance and talk about how their date went with the host. During their second visit, a video is shown about how their date went and what happened. Then, the dates disclose if they would like to stay together for another date, 'just be friends', or end the relationship altogether.

== Episode status ==
Archival status of the show is not known, given the wiping of the early eras. An episode of the 1974 version is held by National Film and Sound Archive.

=== Series overview ===
Season	Episodes	Originally released		
Season	Episodes	First released	Last released	Network
1	—N/a	April 1967	1967	0-10 Network
2	—N/a	1968	1968	0-10 Network
3	—N/a	1969	28 November 1969	0-10 Network
4	—N/a	1970	1970	0-10 Network
5	—N/a	1974	1974	Seven Network
6	220	1991	1991	Network Ten
7	10	15 October 2018	19 December 2018	Network 10
