= Okada Manila =

Resort casino in the Philippines

Coordinates: 14°30′45″N 120°58′50″E

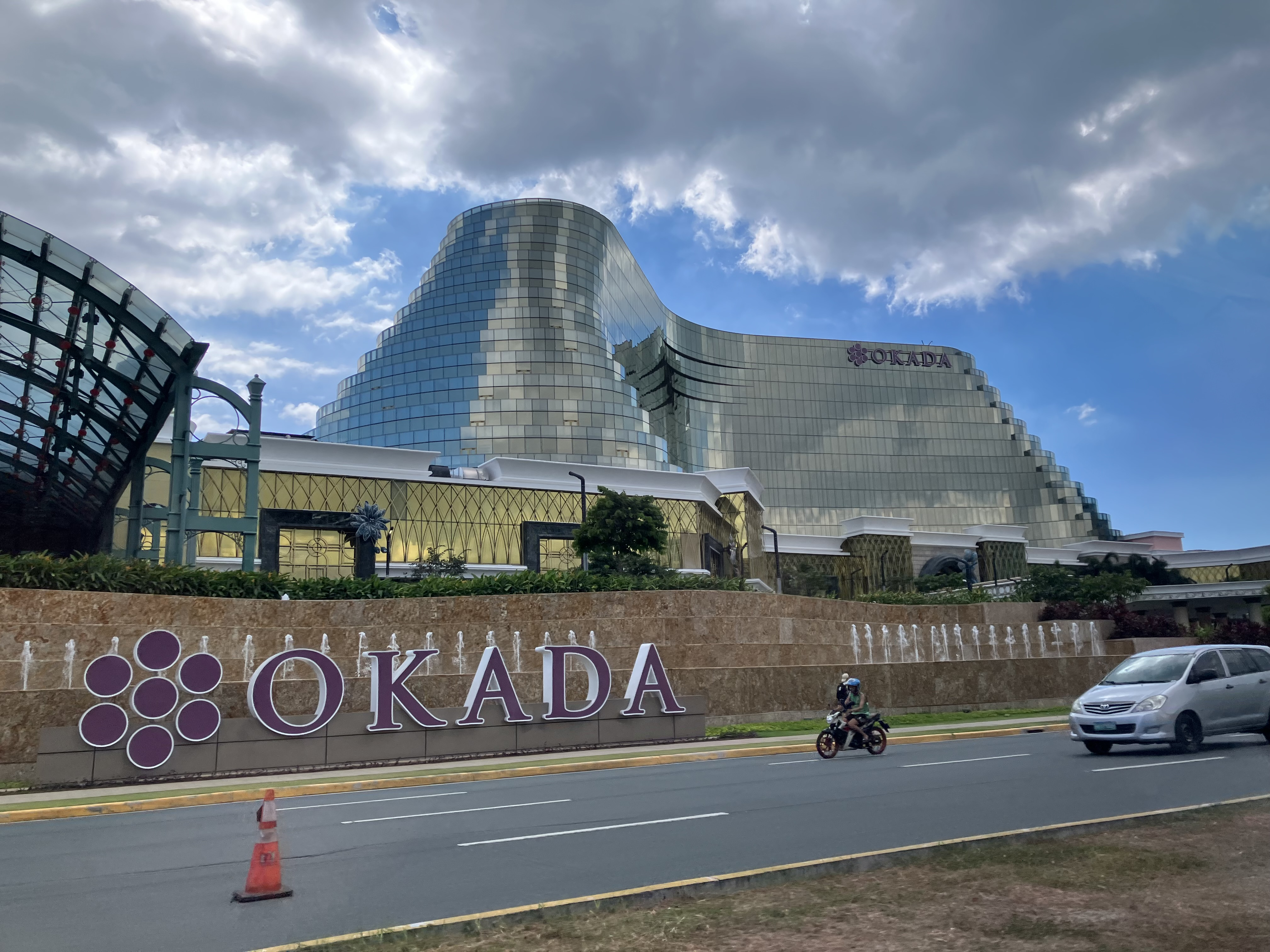
- Okada Manila as seen in 2024
- Interactive map of Okada Manila
- Location: Entertainment City, Parañaque, Philippines
- Opened: December 30, 2016; 9 years ago
- No. of rooms: 1,001
- Gaming space: 26,410.77 m^{2} (284,283.2 sq ft)
- Owner: Tiger Resort Leisure and Entertainment, Inc.
- Operating license holder: PAGCOR
- Architect: GF & Partners; PRSP Architects
- Previous names: Manila Bay Resorts (until June 2016)
- Website: okadamanila.com

Okada Manila (Japanese: オカダマニラ, romanized: Okada Manira) is an integrated resort located on the Entertainment City gaming strip in Parañaque, Metro Manila, Philippines.

== History ==
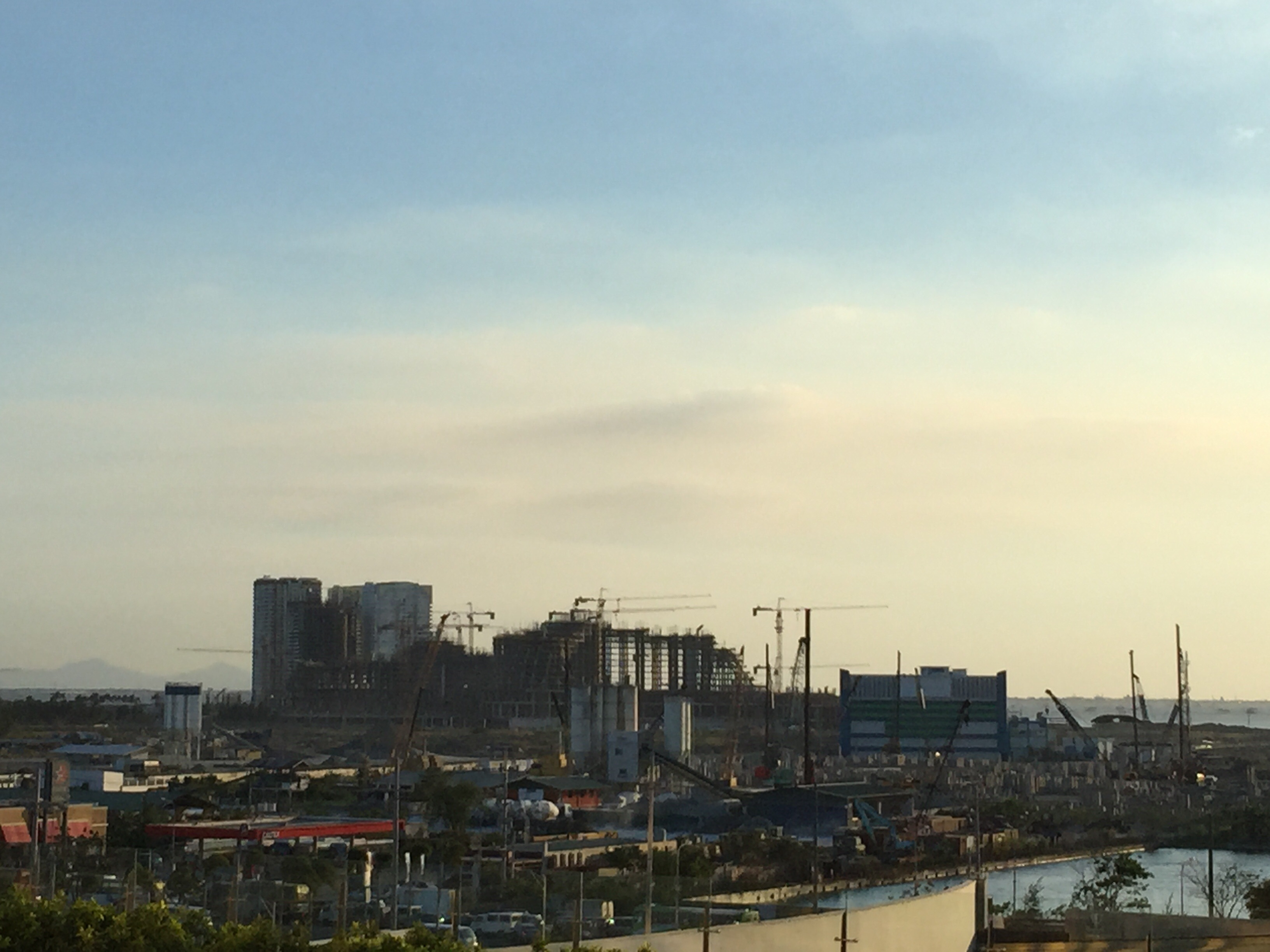
The complex under construction in 2015

Tiger Resort Leisure and Entertainment was granted a license to operate a casino within the Entertainment City in 2008. In June 2016, the casino complex then named as Manila Bay Resorts was re-branded as Okada Manila.

The facility is intended to be used by Okada to compete with casinos in Macau and to position Metro Manila as a regional and international destination. The casino was set to open in November 2016 but the opening was later delayed due to worse-than-expected weather conditions.

The casino complex was opened for "preview" on December 21, 2016, and later commenced operations as a casino on December 30, 2016.

The Fountain, was officially opened on March 31, 2017, to invited guests. On the next day, the casino opened the attraction to the general public.

Kazuo Okada was removed as board chairman of Tiger Resort in 2017 after the Universal Entertainment Corporation, its parent firm, alleged he had misappropriated funds. Okada continues to claim that he is the rightful head of Tiger Resort and filed legal charges against the board while the casino continued to operate.

The operations of the casino was significantly affected by the enhanced community quarantine in Luzon imposed due to the COVID-19 pandemic with 1,000 of its 10,000 staff members retrenched due in June 2020.

The Supreme Court of the Philippines issued a status quo ante order on April 27, 2022, compelling the Tiger Resort to revert to a state prior to Kazuo Okada's removal from its board in 2017. On May 31, 2022, Okada's group took over Okada Manila's operations.

In September 2024, Tomohiro Okada was appointed president and representative director of Universal Entertainment.

In August 2025, Okada Manila announced a leadership transition, with Byron Yip concluding his seven-year tenure as president and chief operating officer. Nobuki Sato was named president and chief operating officer.

== Features ==
Okada Manila nearing completion

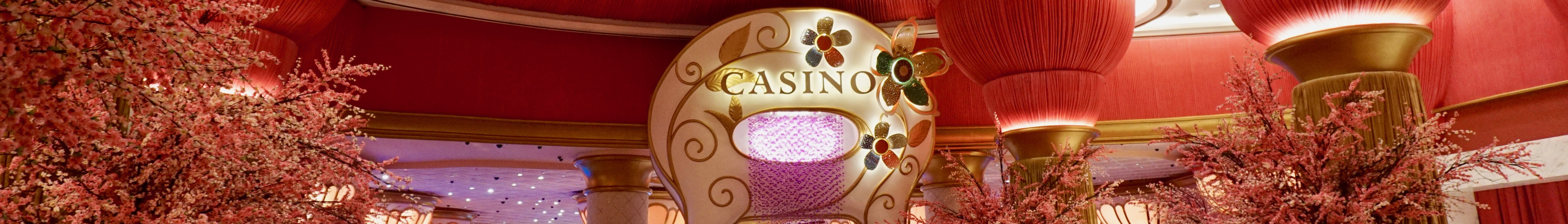
Banner in front of the casino

Okada Manila occupies an area of 44 hectares (110 acres) of the Entertainment City 26,410.77 square meters (284,283.2 sq ft) allotted to gaming. The hotel building of Okada Manila is composed of Pearl Wing and Coral Wing with each wing having 15 floors to be connected by two sky bridges. The glass facade of the building has a gold color representing the hue of Manila Bay's sunset, and is one of the casino's key themes. Both wings has a total of 1,001 rooms.

Phase one of the casino costed US$2.4 billion. More than 3,000 electronic gaming machines and 500 table games were planned to be installed in the casino complex.

Included in Okada Manila's amenities are The Retreat Spa and PLAY, an indoor facility for kids. There is also an allotted 8,409 square meters (90,510 sq ft) shopping area within the casino resort.

=== The Fountain ===
A large central fountain, dubbed as "The Fountain" is the centerpiece of the casino resort complex spanning 37,464 square meters (403,260 sq ft) and costs US$30 million. The Fountain is dubbed as the largest multicolor dancing fountain in the world.

The US$30 million fountain was designed by Los Angeles–based firm, WET. The design was inspired from the "festive traditions of the Philippines", and the sampaguita (Jasminum sambac). The dancing fountain has 739 water nozzles which includes underwater robots which are proprietary of WET, 2,611 colored LED lights and 23 speakers.

The Fountain at Okada Manila is the largest dancing fountain in the Philippines. Measuring 37,464 square metres (403,260 sq ft), the Okada Manila fountain is slightly smaller than The Dubai Fountain at the Burj Khalifa Lake in the United Arab Emirates.

=== The Garden ===
The Garden is an open space overlooking Manila bay. It occupies more than 30,000 square metres (320,000 sq ft) and features five reflective ponds covering over 3,000 square metres (32,000 sq ft).

=== Cove Manila ===
Cove Manila opened to the public on December 15, 2017, with DJ Steve Aoki headlining the event. The venue already hosted an event prior to its opening which was the after-party event for Miss Universe 2016 which was held in January 2017. Notable events include Miss Earth 2019, Miss Earth 2022, Miss Earth 2024, Miss Earth 2025, and actress Jillian Ward's debut on February 25, 2023.

In 2025, Okada Manila was awarded with Forbes Travel Guide 5-star rating for six years in a row and also its spa, The Retreat Spa has been given a Forbes 5-star rating for the third consecutive year.

In May 2025, the venue hosted the inaugural &Friends Festival, a music and pop culture event headlined by Zedd.

== See also ==
- Gambling in Metro Manila
- List of integrated resorts

Events
Preceded by SM Mall of Asia Arena (Philippines) Pasay	Miss Earth venue 2019	Succeeded by Virtual pageant (due to COVID-19 pandemic)
Preceded by Virtual pageant (due to COVID-19 pandemic)	Miss Earth venue 2022	Succeeded by Saigon Exhibition and Convention Center (Vietnam) Ho Chi Minh City
Preceded by Saigon Exhibition and Convention Center (Vietnam) Ho Chi Minh City	Miss Earth venue 2024-2025	Succeeded by Incumbent
