= Adelaide Casino =

Casino in Adelaide, Australia

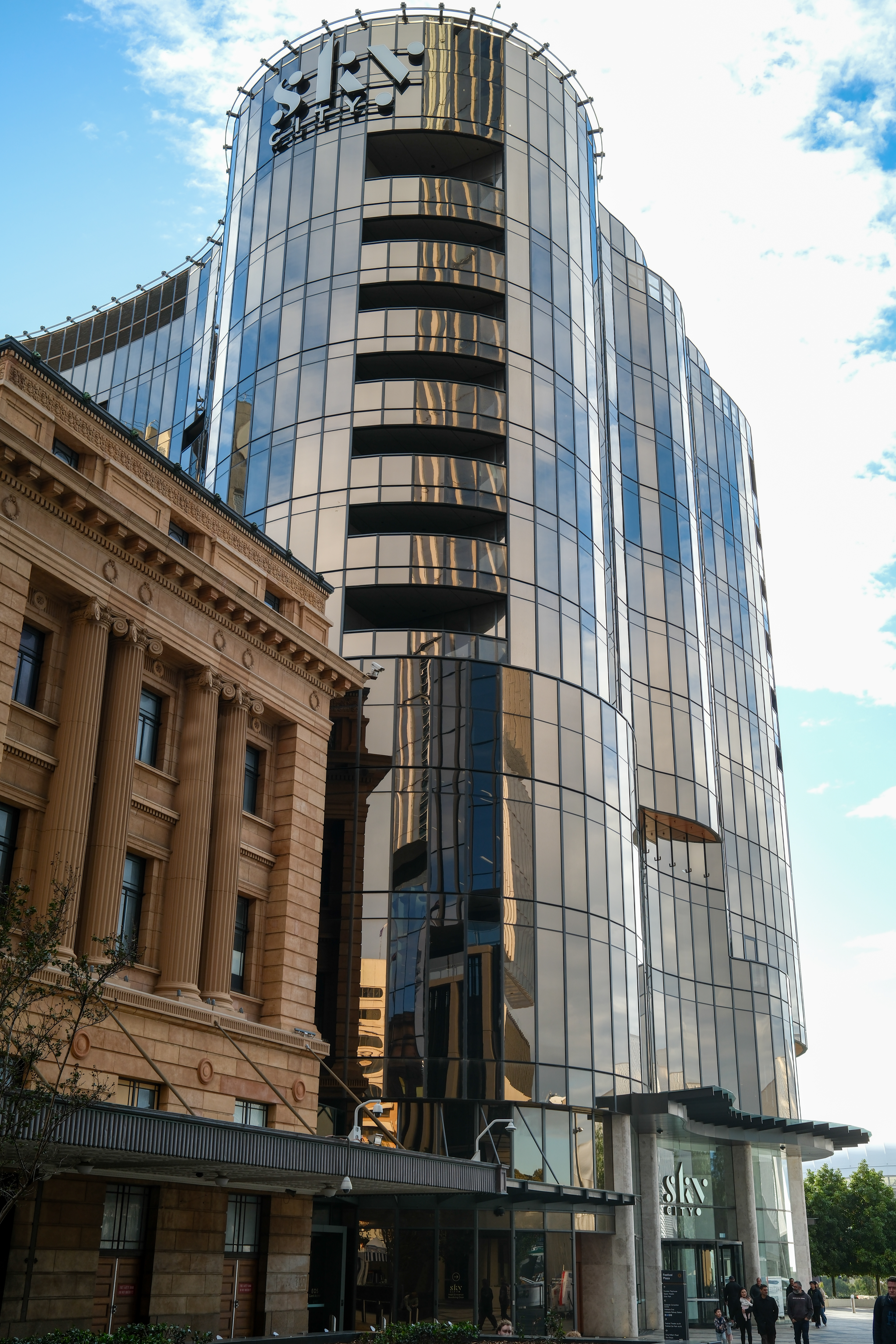
- The building in 2026

- Location within City of Adelaide
- Interactive map of Adelaide Casino
- Location: North Terrace, Adelaide, South Australia; 34°55′16.74″S 138°35′51.31″E
- Opened: 12 December 1985
- No. of rooms: 120 (At EOS by SkyCity)
- Gaming space: 129,000 square feet
- Notable restaurants: Sean's Kitchen, Madame Hanoi, Barossa Bar & Grill, Patty Mac's, Sôl Rooftop, iTL Italian Kitchen
- Casino type: Land
- Owner: Skycity Entertainment Group
- Previous names: Adelaide Casino (1985–2001), SkyCity Adelaide Casino (2001–present)
- Renovated in: 2020-2021
- Website: www.skycityadelaide.com.au

Adelaide Casino, known commercially as SkyCity Adelaide, is a large casino and recreational venue on the north edge of the Adelaide city centre. Located in the heritage-listed Adelaide railway station building on North Terrace, Adelaide, the casino has 90 gaming tables and 950 gaming machines, as well as several bars, function areas and restaurants. Operated as part of the SkyCity Entertainment Group, it is the sole licensed casino in South Australia, regulated by the Independent Gambling Authority and the Liquor and Gambling Commissioner (Consumer and Business Services) under the Casino Act 1997.

The casino is the 10th largest employer in South Australia, currently employing over 1100 staff members. In 2007 and 2008, Adelaide Casino paid over $41 million in taxes and charges to the state and federal governments.

== History ==
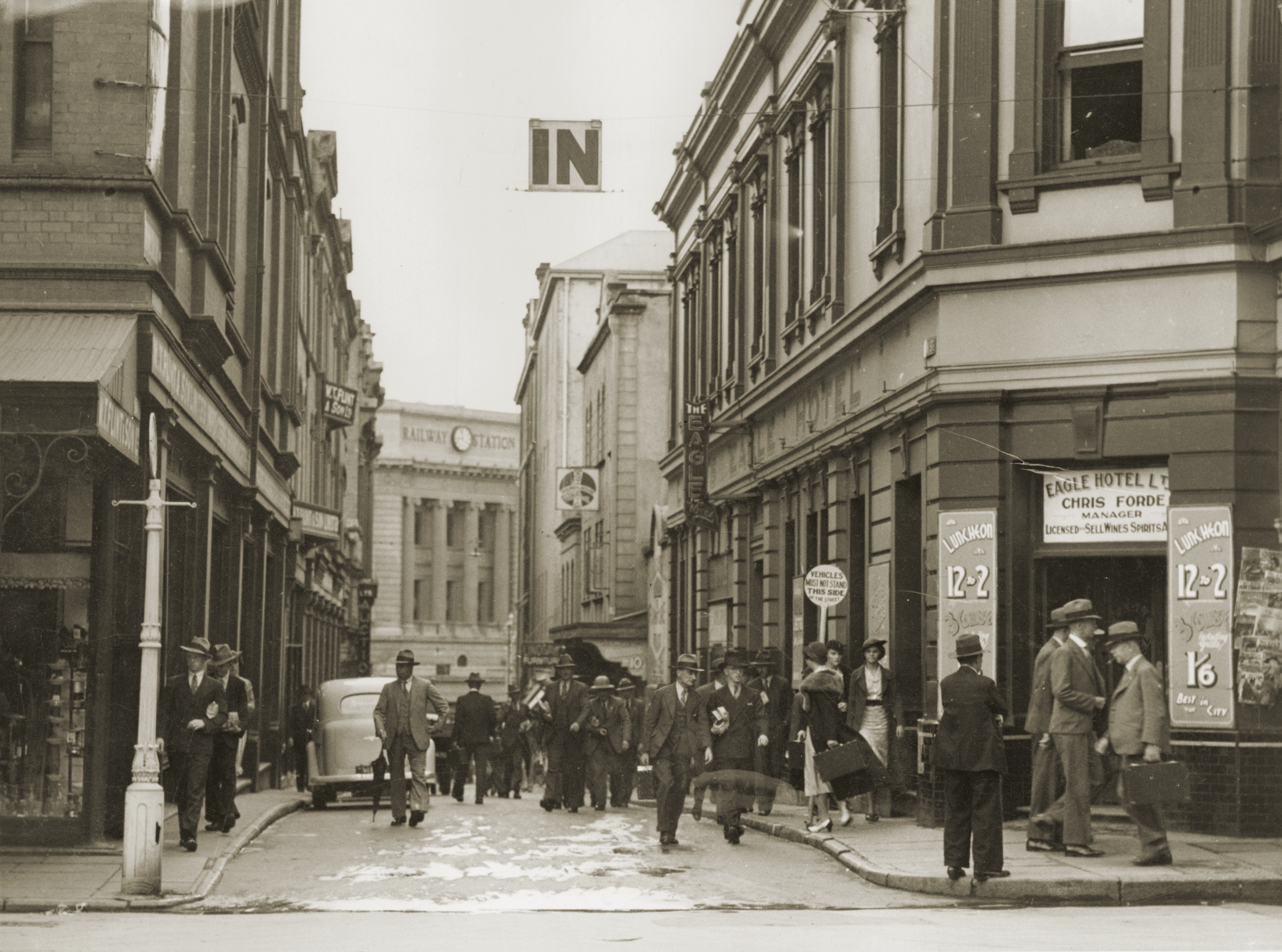
Looking towards what is now the Adelaide Casino entrance from a lane way (Bank St) extending from Hindley Street, 1937

The Adelaide Casino opened in December 1985, the casino licence being held by the (state-owned) Lotteries Commission which appointed Aitco Pty Ltd to establish and operate a casino on its behalf. Originally consisting of 89 gaming tables, in 1991 the casino was authorised to operate video gaming machines, and in 1993 to operate poker machines. By 1997 they totalled 674 machines. The monies received by the Commission from the Casino operator include unclaimed prizes, licence fees, 13.75% of net gaming revenue from tables, and 4.0% of turnover from machines. In the year ending June 1995 the amount paid to the Government was $20.20 million.

In June 2000 the casino was sold to SkyCity Entertainment Group, under a new licensing regime which eliminated the separation of roles of the licensee and the operator and provided for the grant of a single casino licence. The new licensee was SkyCity Adelaide Pty Ltd and the approved licensing agreement locked in 15 years of exclusivity over casino table games which also included fixed rates of duty for the exclusivity period. The property was officially renamed SkyCity Adelaide in April 2001. A three-year interior redevelopment project began in December 2003. In 2009 the name reverted to Adelaide Casino.

In 2007 following widening of North Terrace to create space for two tramlines, the Balfours Pie Cart, which sold pie floaters, was removed from its location.

Following licence variations formalised on 11 October 2013, SkyCity Adelaide's casino licence gave Adelaide Casino a monopoly on table games and automated table game product in South Australia until 30 June 2035 (a 20-year extension of the original exclusivity), along with new duty arrangements. The Adelaide Casino competes for gaming machine (slot) business with South Australia's hotels and licensed clubs (of which about 480 are licensed to operate just over 12,400 machines). The new licence arrangements increased the property's capacity from 90 to 200 tables and from 995 to 1500 gaming machines, subject to redevelopment to provide the required floor space.

As part of a major interior refurbishment in 2014, the Casino commissioned hand-crafted glass light pendants from a team of 12 artists at the JamFactory studios, which would be hung from the ceiling of the A$5 million+ SKYroom (formerly the Pearl Room).

As part of the Riverbank precinct redevelopment started in 2015 which includes the Adelaide Convention Centre and Adelaide Festival Centre, the Casino announced an expansion beginning in 2018, aiming to transform it into "an integrated entertainment destination on the Festival Plaza forecourt". Most of the redevelopment was completed in 2020/2021.

In 2021, EOS by SkyCity opened in the new $330m development project. EOS has 120 rooms and Sôl Rooftoop, along with expanded gaming space.

The casino's interests have been represented to the South Australian parliament by former Treasurer turned political lobbyist, Kevin Foley, since 2019.

== See also ==
- Gambling in Australia
