= Graham Webb (broadcaster) =

Australian broadcaster (1936–2024)

- Born: 19 April 1936
- Died: 26 April 2024 (aged 88); Gold Coast, Queensland, Australia
- Occupations: Radio and television broadcaster, producer
- Years active: 1957-?

Graham "Spider" Webb (19 April 1936 – 26 April 2024) was an Australian radio and television broadcaster and producer.

== Career ==
Webb began his radio career at 2TM, Tamworth, New South Wales in 1954. In 1955 he moved to Brisbane to become the "junior" announcer for 4BH, before moving on to 4GY Gympie to gain more experience.

After a stint in National Service, Webb returned to Sydney in 1957, where he became the announcer for the Sunday religious programs on 2CH. Subsequently, Webb became Reg Grundy's offsider on the radio version of Wheel of Fortune.

In late 1957, Webb joined radio station 2UE, where he hosted the first Top 40 radio show on Sydney radio in the late 1950s, working with Gary O'Callaghan, John Laws, Tony Withers and Bob Rogers. This was followed by a brief move to 4KQ in Brisbane in 1960, then back to Sydney to host the 2GB breakfast show in 1961.

In 1964 Webb headed for Europe, where he worked at several radio stations including Deutsche Welle, "German Wave". He eventually moved to the United Kingdom during the mid 1960s, where he, along with several other Australian disc jockeys, became prominent in the flourishing pirate radio scene.

Webb joined Radio Caroline in 1965, going on to become Programme Controller and later, News Director. He was one of the staff rescued from MV Mi Amigo when she ran aground at Frinton, England in January 1966. He left Radio Caroline and returned to Australia, before the proclamation of the Marine, &c., Broadcasting (Offences) Act 1967, which forced the closure of pirate radio stations.

From 1967 until July 1970, Webb presented the Australian end of the long running Family Favourites radio series on BBC Radio and ABC Radio, when Bob Moore took over. Webb returned to Family Favourites in September 1970, after Bob Moore resigned from the ABC, in order to join Webb's former employer 2CH. This turned out to be short-lived, as then-ABC newsreader Ross Symonds took over from Webb in January 1971. At the same time he hosted several TV shows, including Blind Date, which he hosted between 1967 and November 1969. It received a new look in 1974, when Scottish-born singer Bobby Hanna took over. He also hosted Jeopardy from 1970 to 1972, when Mal Walden took over as host.

In 1974, Webb hosted and produced the pioneering Saturday morning music video series The Graham Webb Saturday Today Show, which evolved into Sounds Unlimited, the world’s first program to feature pop video clips, a forerunner to MTV. As the producer of Sounds Unlimited, Webb played a pivotal role in the career of video and feature film director Russell Mulcahy. In need of material for the new show, Webb approached Mulcahy, who was a staffer in the ATN-7 newsroom, and asked him to film some footage to accompany popular songs for which there were no purpose-made clips (e.g. Kris Kristofferson's "Why Me" and Harry Nilsson's "Everybody's Talking"). Using this method, Webb and Mulcahy assembled a collection of around 25 clips for the first show. The success of his early efforts encouraged Mulcahy to quit his TV job to become a full-time director. He made clips for popular Australian acts including Stylus, Marcia Hines, Hush and AC/DC, before moving to the UK, where he became one of the most successful music video directors of the 1980s and beyond.

While TV took Webb's time, he always had a hand in radio throughout the 1970s and 1980s, working at several stations including 2GB, 2SM and 2UW in Sydney. In the 1980s he was the promotional voice for Seven Network programming and was heard on Gold FM and the ABC.

In 1999 he co-founded Sunshine FM – a radio station targeting seniors, which went to air in 2000. Webb hosted its breakfast program until 2011, when Cam Young took over.

Webb hosted a program called "Webby's Golden Years Of Radio", an audio book of his life behind the microphone. It was a weekly 2 hour program, syndicated to many community and narrowcast stations around Australia. About the program, Webb stated: "Along with the amazing music from the past 6 decades, I am including personal interviews with stars such as The Beatles, Monkees, ABBA and many others, especially our own Aussie stars. I'm also including entertaining 'grabs' from radio shows of the past from my personal collection."

In later years, Webb presented regular programs on a number of stations, including Vintage FM Penrith/Camden, Bay FM Nelson Bay and Harmony FM Richmond.

== Personal life and death ==
Graham Webb was born on 19 April 1936. By 1994, Webb relocated to the Gold Coast, Queensland. After his wife, Tina, died from cancer in 1995, Webb and his two sons relocated to the Sunshine Coast. One of his sons, Byron currently works as a smoothfm drive presenter.

Webb died at the Gold Coast University Hospital on 26 April 2024, at the age of 88.
