= Dan Schreiber (poker player) =

American poker player and gamer (born 1985)

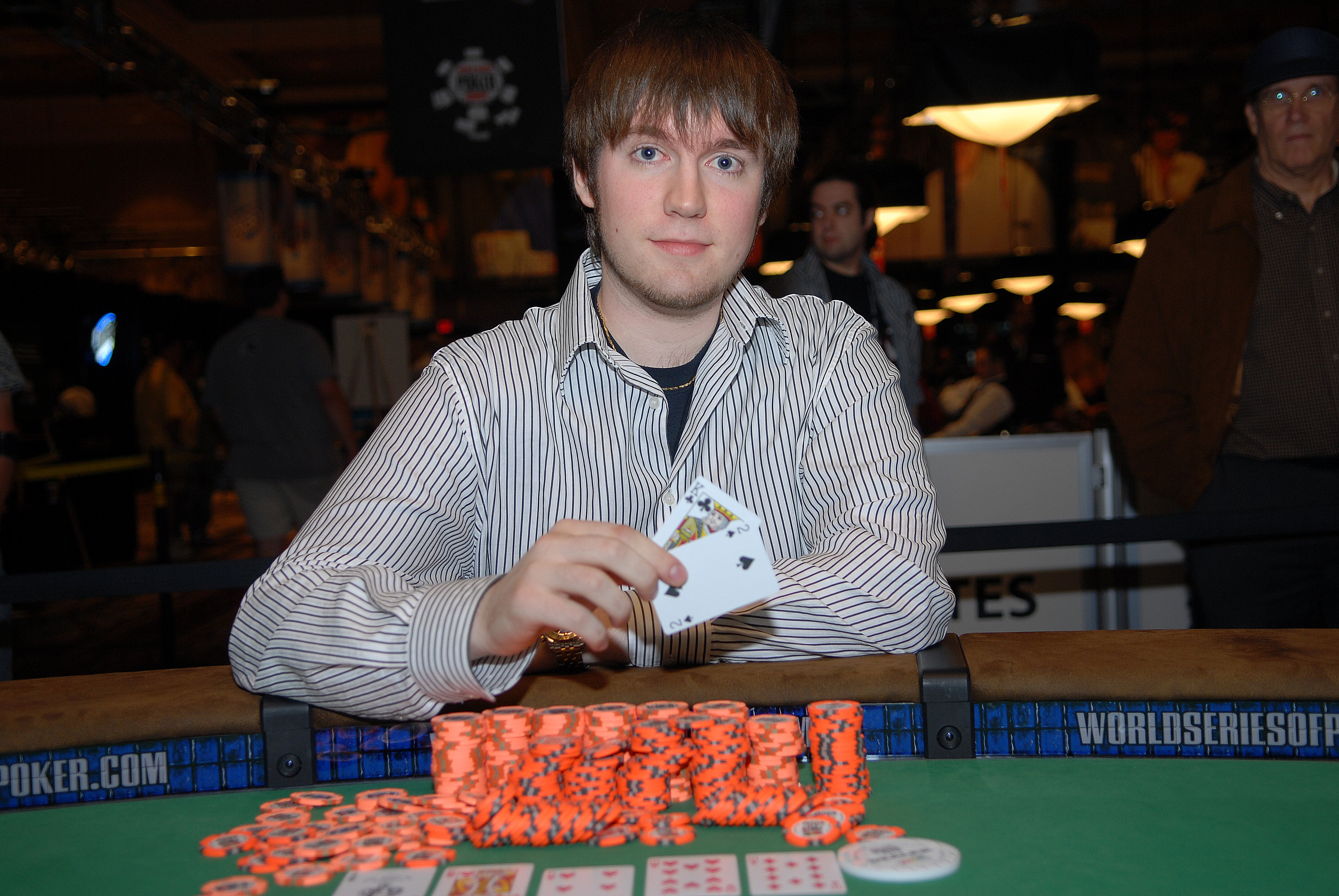
- Schreiber after winning the $5000 Heads-Up championship at the 2007 World Series of Poker
- Nickname: Rekrul
- Born: June 30, 1985 (age 41)

World Series of Poker
- Bracelet: 1
- Money finish: 1
- Highest WSOP Main Event finish: None

Dan Schreiber (born June 30, 1985) is an American pro gamer and poker player from Troy, Ohio. He currently resides in San Diego, California.

In the 2007 WSOP Heads-Up Event, Schreiber swept Las Vegas poker pro Mark Muchnik in the best two out of three matches at the final table. The first match lasted 79 hands while the second lasted only 11 hands. At the time Schreiber was the fifth youngest player ever to win a World Series of Poker bracelet having done so 8 days prior to his 22nd birthday.

Schreiber is a long-time professional StarCraft gamer. Before playing poker full-time, he played StarCraft in South Korea on Team Hexatron as a professional gamer. His nickname Rekrul ("Lurker" backwards, a popular unit from the game) is well known amongst StarCraft enthusiasts. In 2003, Schreiber won 1st place in Starcraft at WCG USA. In between his time as a professional gamer and a poker player, Schreiber studied engineering at the University of Cincinnati for one year.

Two months after his WSOP victory, he finished 8th at the Asia Pacific Poker Tour Seoul event.

As of 2015, his live tournament winnings exceed $690,000.

== World Series of Poker Bracelets ==
Year	Tournament	Prize (US$)
2007	$5,000 Heads-Up NLHE	$425,594
