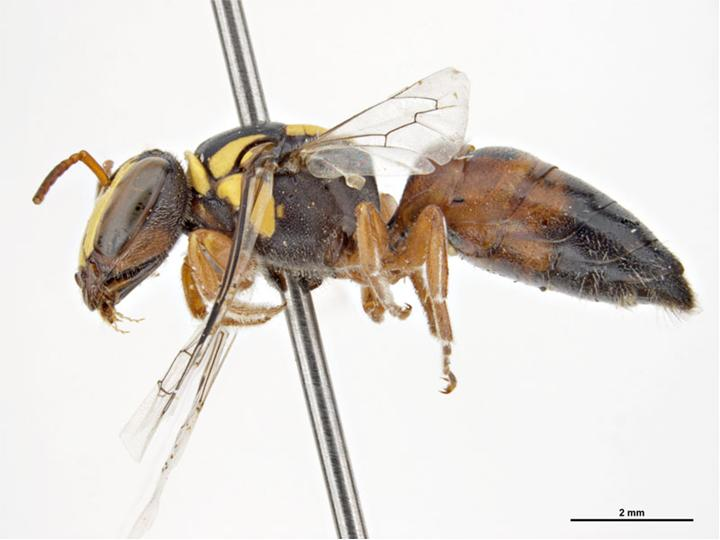
- Female

Scientific classification
- Kingdom: Animalia
- Phylum: Arthropoda
- Clade: Pancrustacea
- Class: Insecta
- Order: Hymenoptera
- Family: Colletidae
- Genus: Hylaeus
- Species: H. dromedarius

Binomial name
- Hylaeus dromedarius (Cockerell, 1910)

Synonyms
- Prosopis dromedarius Cockerell, 1910; Prosopis indicator Cockerell, 1910; Euprosopis elegans butleri Rayment, 1930

= Hylaeus dromedarius =

Species of bee

Hylaeus dromedarius, or Hylaeus (Euprosopellus) dromedarius, is a species of bee in the family Colletidae and subfamily Hylaeinae. It is endemic to Australia. It was described by British-American entomologist Theodore Dru Alison Cockerell in 1910.

== Description ==
Male body length is about 8 mm. Integumental colouration is mainly black, with yellow and red markings.

== Distribution and habitat ==
The species occurs across southern mainland Australia. Type localities include Adelaide, the Victorian Mallee and Mount Macedon, Victoria.

== Behaviour ==
The adults are flying mellivores. Flowering plants visited by the bees include Eucalyptus, Pittosporum and Melaleuca species.

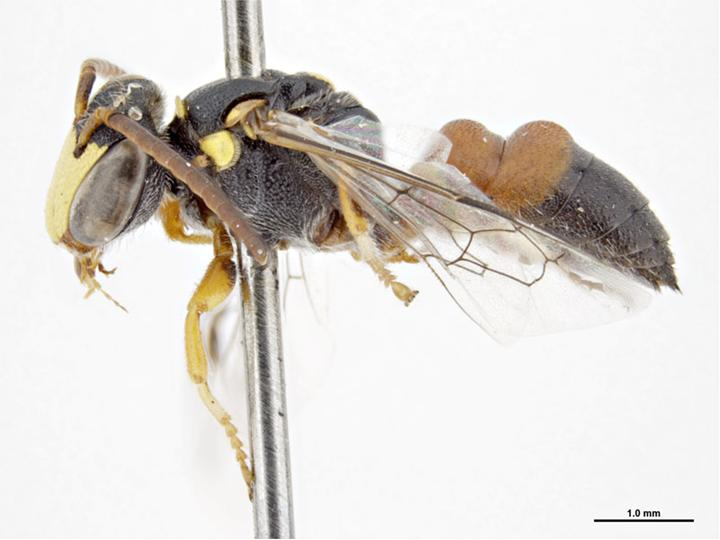
Male
