= Mount Macedon =

Mountain in Victoria, Australia

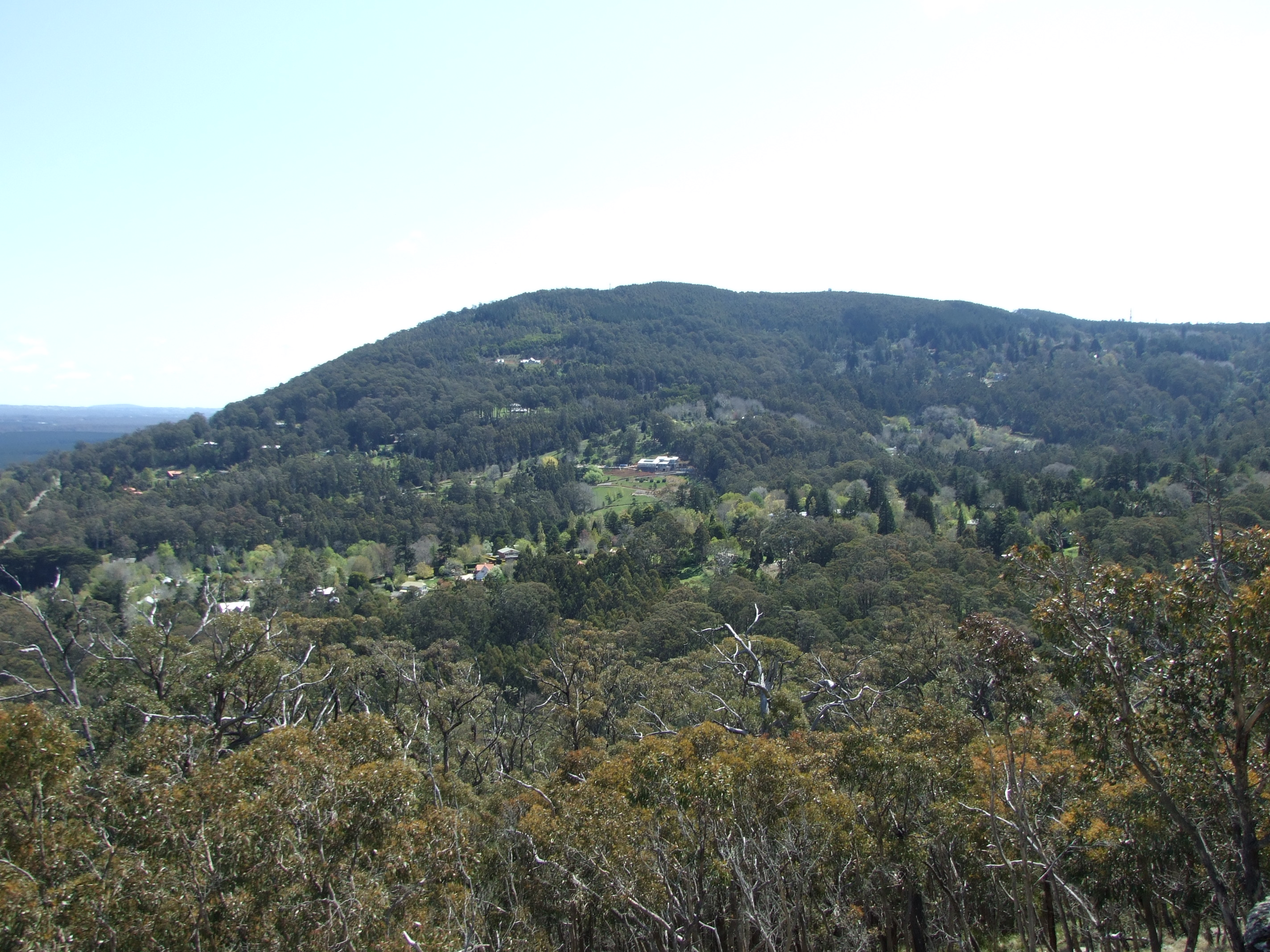
- Mount Macedon, above the town of Mount Macedon.

Highest point
- Elevation: 1,001 metres (3,284 ft)
- Prominence: 643 metres (2,110 ft)
- Parent peak: Camel's Hump or Camels Hump
- Coordinates: 37°22′59″S 144°34′35″E

Naming
- Native name: Geboor; Geburrh (Woiwurrung)

Geography
- Location within Victoria
- Location: Central Highlands, Victoria, Australia
- Parent range: Macedon Ranges, Great Dividing Range

Climbing
- First ascent: Thomas Mitchell (European: 1836)

Mount Macedon (/ˈmæsədən/ MASS-ə-dən; Aboriginal Woiwurrung language: Geboor or Geburrh) is an extinct volcano that is part of the Macedon Ranges of the Great Dividing Range, located in the Central Highlands region of Victoria, Australia. The mountain has an elevation of 1,001 metres (3,284 ft) with a prominence of 643 metres (2,110 ft) and is located approximately 65 kilometres (40 mi) northwest of Melbourne.

== Etymology ==
The mountain is known as Geboor or Geburrh in the Aboriginal Woiwurrung language of the Wurundjeri people.

The mountain was sighted by Hamilton Hume and William Hovell on their 1824 expedition to Port Phillip from New South Wales. They named it Mount Wentworth. It was renamed Mount Macedon by explorer Major Thomas Mitchell who ascended the mountain in 1836. He named it after Philip of Macedon in honour of the fact that he was able to view Port Phillip from the summit. Several other geographic features along the path of his third Australia Felix expedition were named after figures of Ancient Macedonia including the nearby Campaspe River and Mount Alexander near Castlemaine (named after Alexander the Great).

== History ==
At the base of Mount Macedon is an axe-grinding site, a large sandstone boulder with thirty-one grooves made by the sharpening of stone axes. This is an important cultural heritage site for the Wurundjeri tribe.

== Summit ==
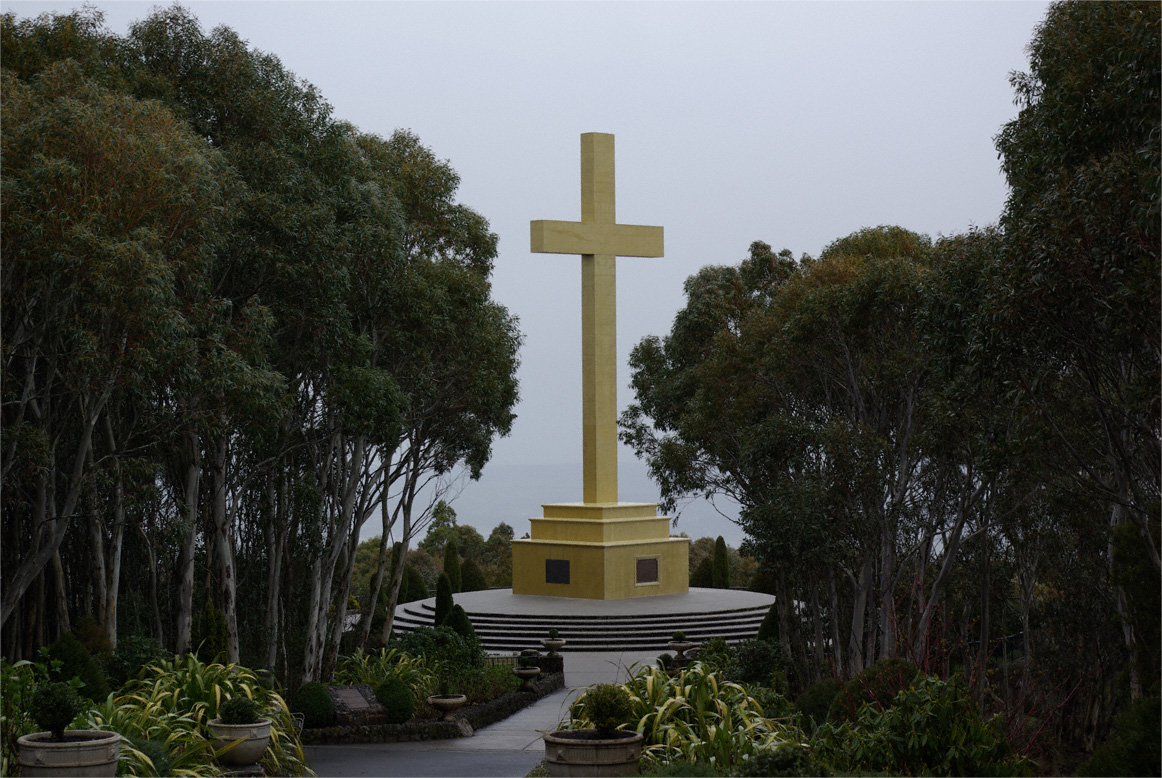
The Mount Macedon Memorial Cross

The highest peak of Mount Macedon is Camel's Hump, or Camels Hump, one of three mamelons in the area, the rocky outcrop of a once small steep-sided volcano, with an elevation estimated at 1,011 metres (3,317 ft), and at times is covered in snow. Camel's Hump, together with Hanging Rock and Croziers Rocks are igneous trachyte rocks of the crag and are favoured by rock climbers. The mountain has become a popular venue for sport climbing and for families, due to its proximity to Melbourne.

The view from the summit of Mount Macedon is spectacular, and takes in Melbourne city, the Dandenong Ranges and the You Yangs near Geelong.

=== Mount Macedon Memorial Cross ===
Mount Macedon Memorial Cross is a 21-metre (69 ft) high monument standing near the summit of the mountain, in an area called Cross Reserve. It was established in 1935 by William Cameron, an early resident of the town of Mount Macedon, as a memorial to his son and others who had died in World War I.

== Climate ==
Total rainfall approaches 1,000 millimetres (39 in) annually, reaching a maximum in winter, with minimum amounts occurring during the summer months of January to March. Snowfalls occurs on 15–20 days a year, with snow lying occurring on 10–15 days a year. As with the entire region, Mount Macedon is susceptible to severe frost, generally between the months of May and September, with light frosts throughout the rest of the year and minimal frost between January and March. Extreme minimums have been recorded near −9 °C (16 °F). A feature of the region in winter is the occasional appearance of black ice.

== Notable events ==
On 8 November 1948, Douglas DC-3 VH-UZK operated by Australian National Airways crashed on Mount Macedon a few minutes after leaving Essendon Airport. The pilot and first officer died; the cabin crew and all 19 passengers survived, with relatively minor injuries. The event is commemorated on a plaque in Cross Reserve.

== See also ==
- List of mountains in Australia § Victoria
- Mount Macedon, Victoria
- Macedon, Victoria
