= Ulmus glabra 'Pendula Variegata' =

Elm cultivar

- Species: Ulmus glabra
- Cultivar: 'Pendula Variegata'
- Origin: England

The Wych Elm cultivar Ulmus glabra 'Pendula Variegata' was first described in 1850 in The Gardeners' Chronicle as Ulmus montana var. pendula foliis variegatis, 'the weeping silver-striped wych or Scotch elm' by Messrs. Pontey of Pontey's nursery, Kirkheaton, Huddersfield, Yorkshire, who propagated and distributed it, and later by J. F. Wood in The Midland Florist and Suburban Horticulturist (1851) as U. montana pendula variegata, the 'broad-leaved variegated weeping mountain elm'. It was listed by Hartwig & Rümpler in Illustrirtes Gehölzbuch (1875) as Ulmus montana var. pendula variegata Hort.

Pontey's had earlier introduced the wych cultivar 'Lutescens'.

== Description ==
Pontey described the foliage as "distinctly striped or margined with silver" and "remarkable for its constancy in variegation", while the tree itself was as "robust and pendulous" as the common weeping wych. (In 1850 "the common weeping wych" was 'Horizontalis', 'Camperdown' elm being new to cultivation.) J. F. Wood described the variety as "a first rate ornamental tree" with "beautifully striped foliage" and pendulous branches, and Frederick Hanham (1857) as "a most beautiful and highly ornamental tree". Green (1964) listed it as a form of 'Pendula' (: 'Horizontalis') with beautiful white-variegated leaves.

== Pests and diseases ==
Not known.

== Cultivation ==
No specimens are known to survive. The tree was cultivated at the Royal Victoria Park, Bath, from the 1850s, where it was described as "the variegated-leaved Weeping Scotch Elm" (though it was absent from Milburn's 1905 Victoria Park elm list), and at Kew Gardens, from c. 1896 until at least 1925.
