= Ulmus glabra 'Horizontalis' =

Elm cultivar

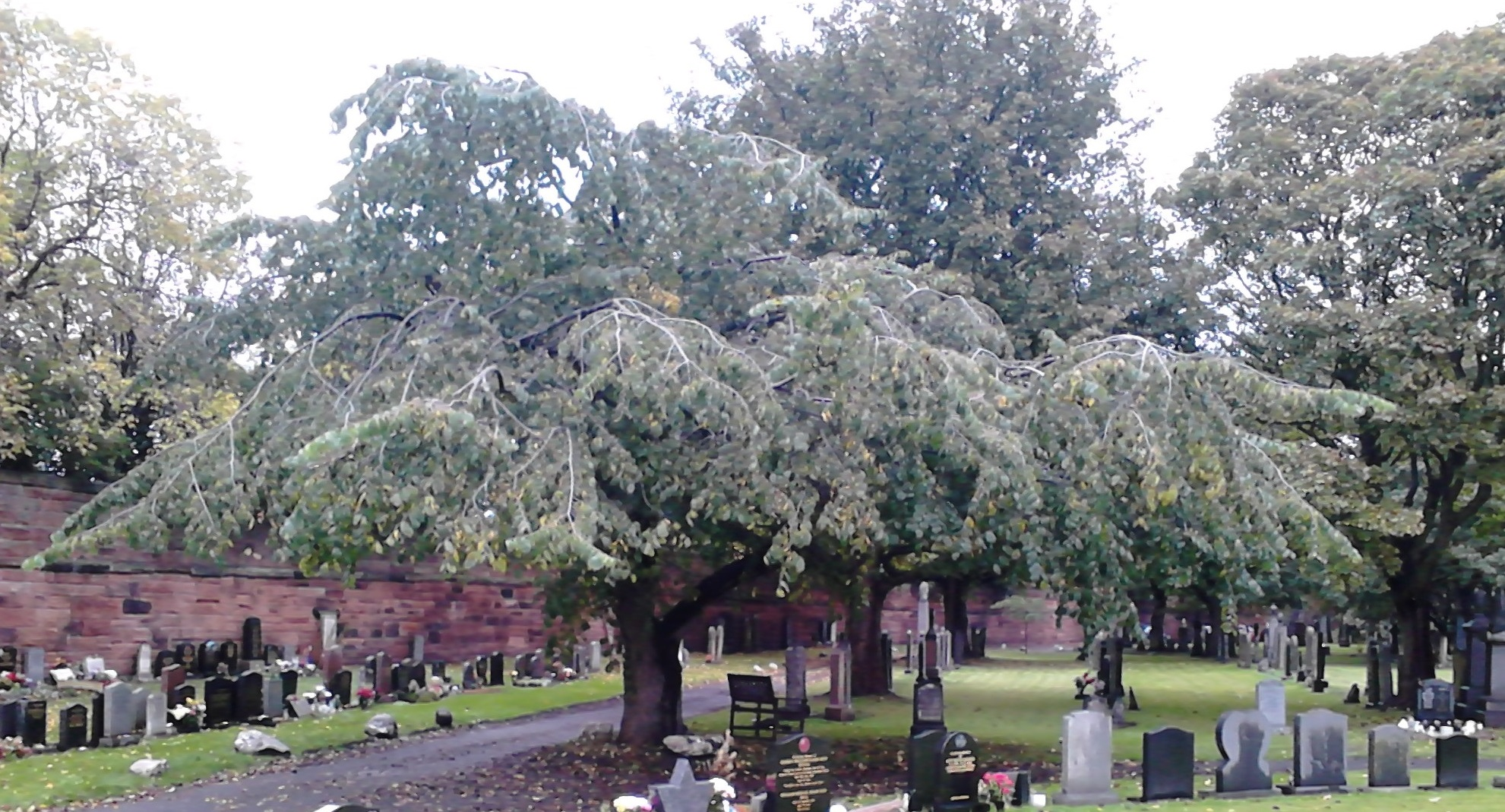
- 'Horizontalis', Seafield Cemetery, Edinburgh
- Species: Ulmus glabra
- Cultivar: 'Horizontalis'
- Origin: Perth, Scotland

The Wych Elm cultivar Ulmus glabra 'Horizontalis', commonly known as the Weeping Wych Elm or Horizontal Elm, was discovered in a Perth nursery circa 1816. The tree was originally identified as 'Pendula' by Loddiges (London), in his catalogue of 1836, a name adopted by Loudon two years later in Arboretum et Fruticetum Britannicum, 3: 1398, 1838, but later sunk as a synonym for 'Horizontalis'.

== Description ==
'Horizontalis' has branches that extend out horizontally with weeping branchlets. It is usually grafted onto a tall understock of Ulmus glabra to effectively display its weeping habit. The tree can eventually grow to a height of 20 metres with a similar spread. It can be distinguished from the related Camperdown Elm by its more spreading and flattened canopy and much larger mature size, although its shape does vary widely, as noted by Loudon: "A beautiful...tree generally growing to one side, spreading its branches out in a fan-like manner...sometimes horizontally and at other times almost perpendicularly downwards so that the head of the tree exhibits great variety of shape".

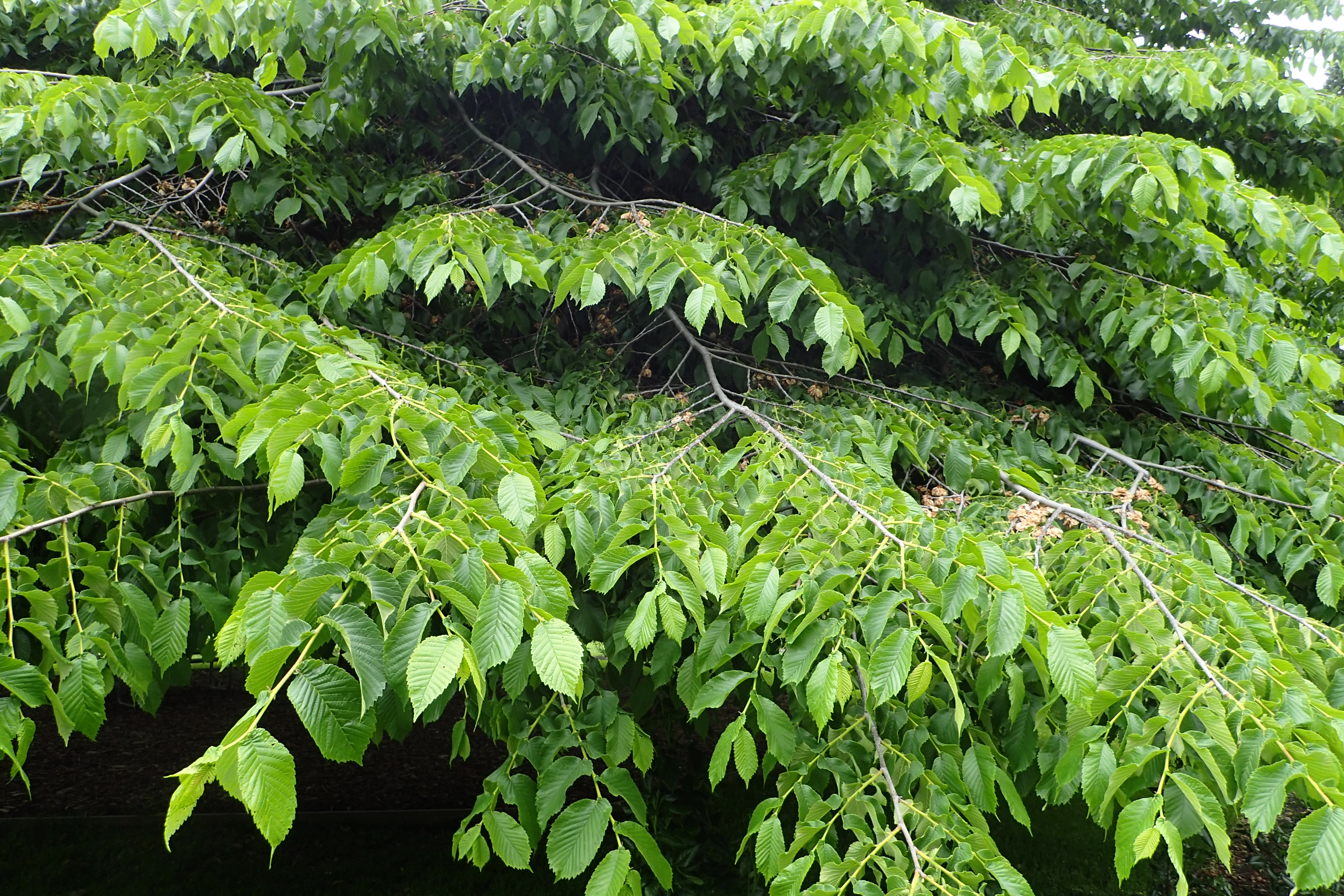
Spring foliage of 'Horizontalis'

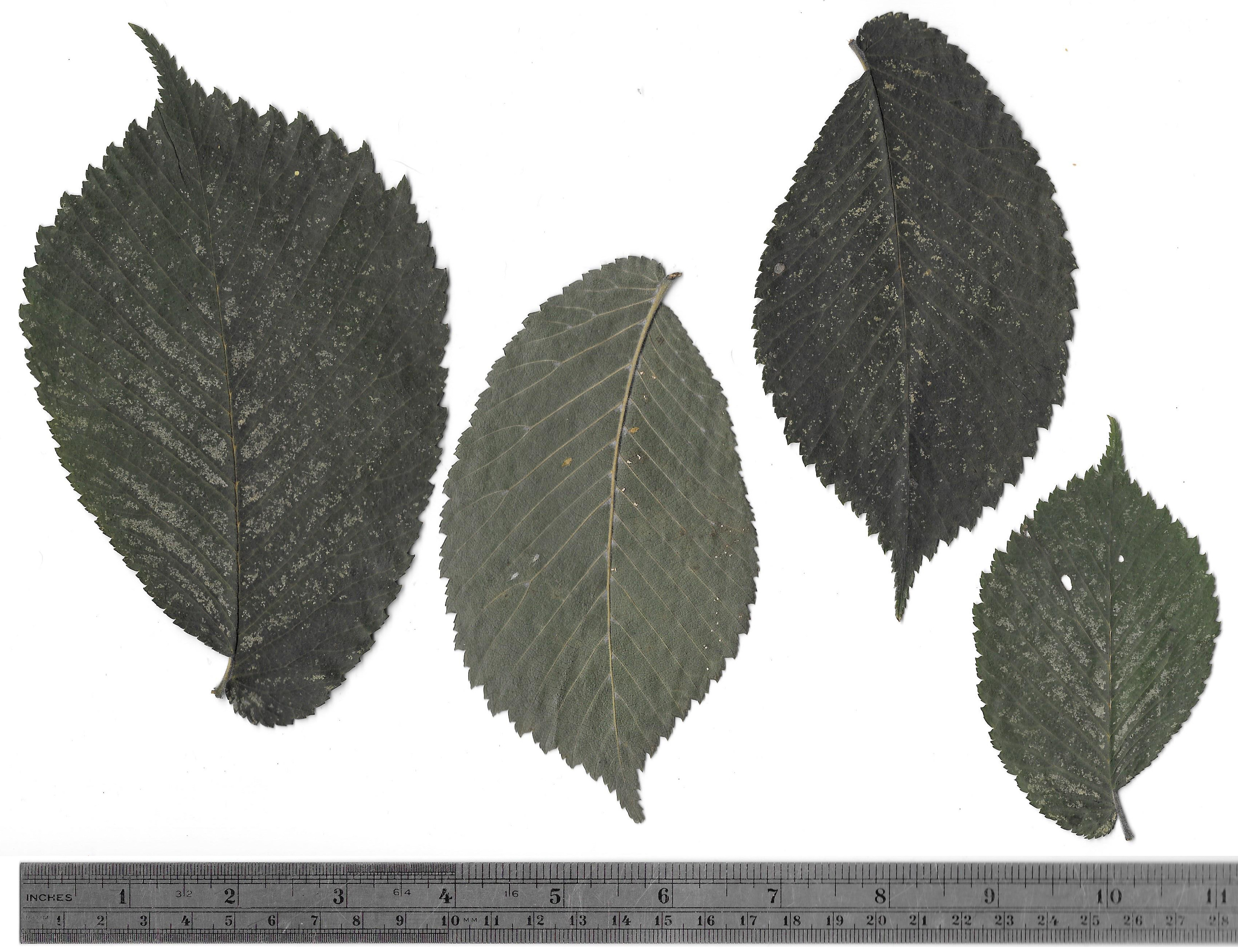
Dried short-shoot 'Horizontalis' leaves (August)

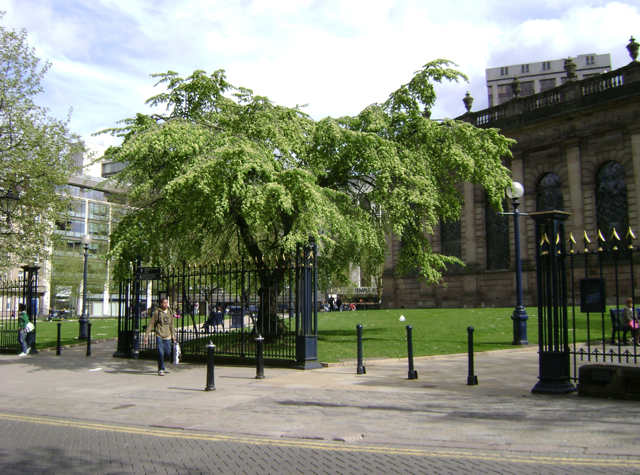
'Horizontalis', St Philip's Cathedral churchyard, Birmingham

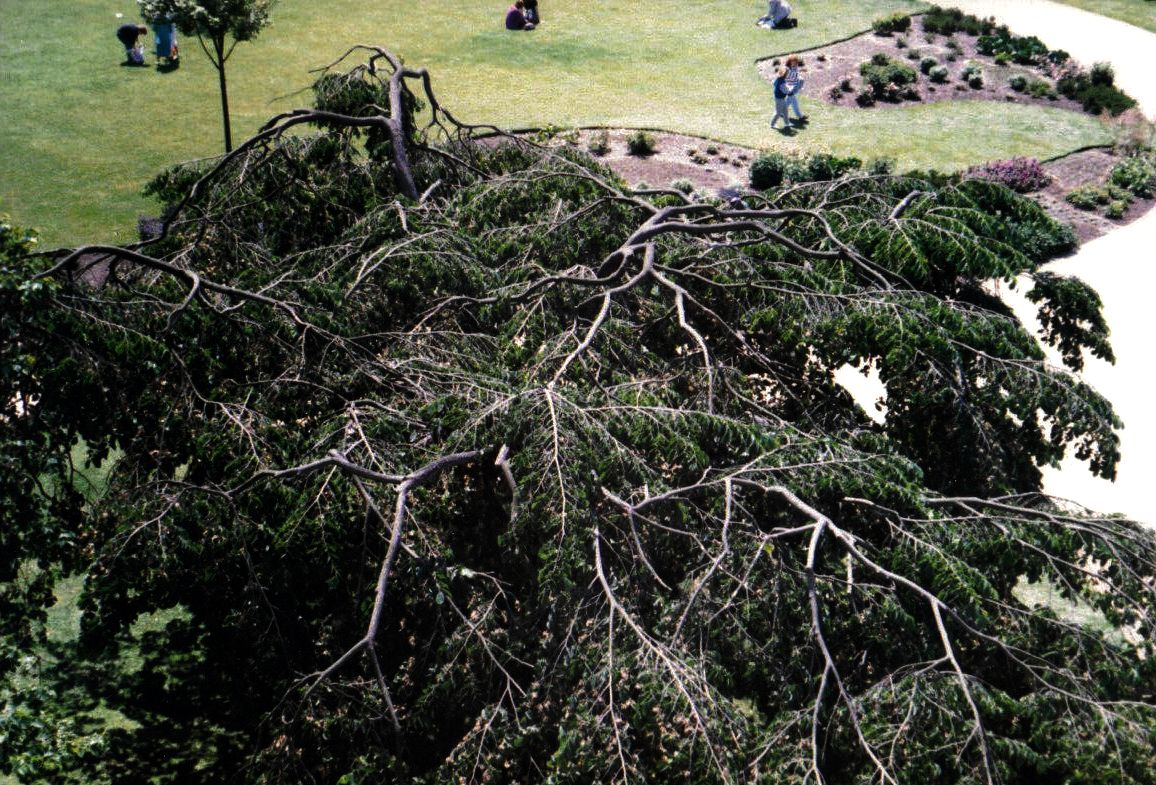
Top of 'Horizontalis' in Royal Pavilion Gardens, Brighton, UK, in 1988

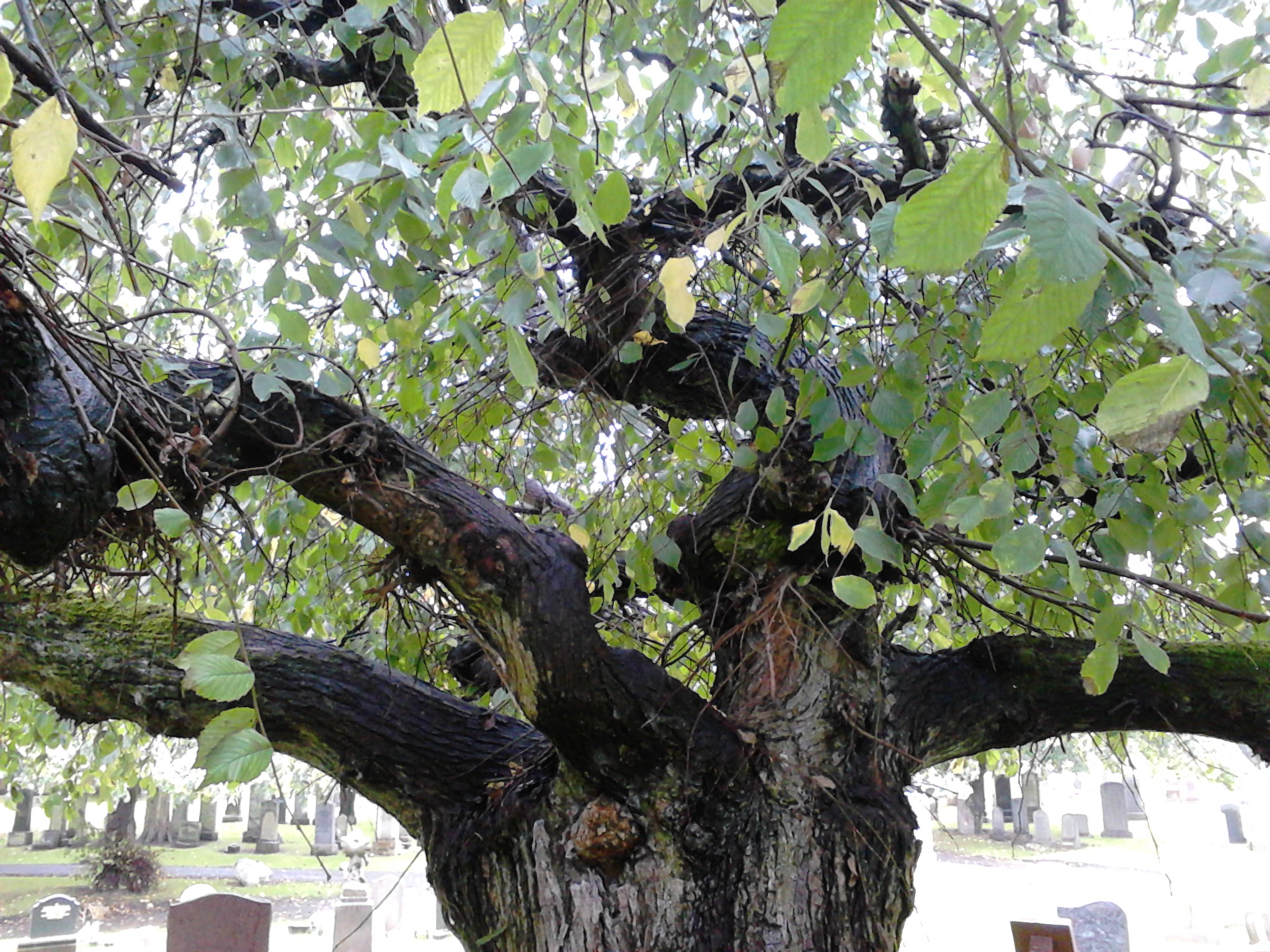
An expert graft, for even, horizontal growth

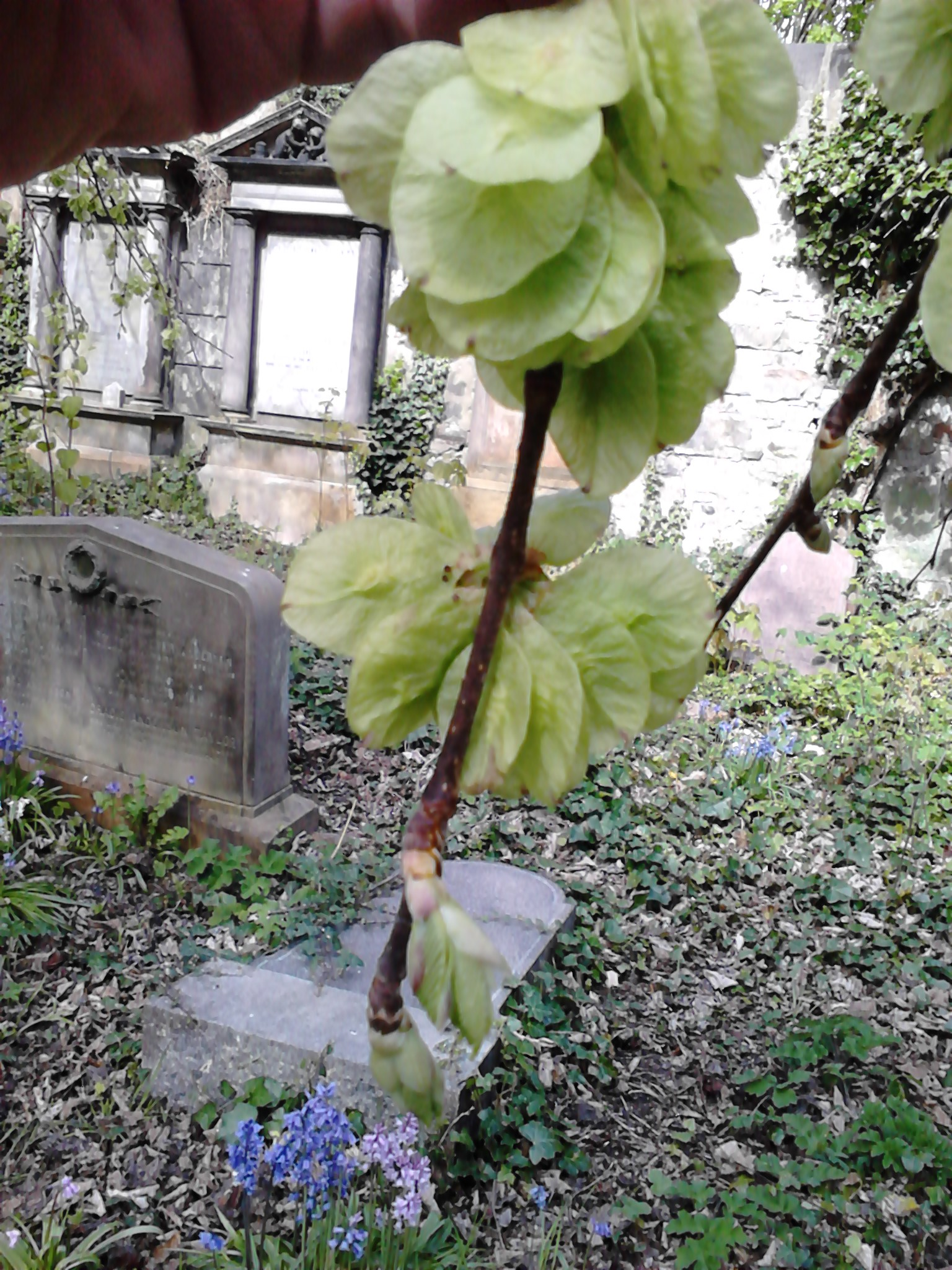
'Horizontalis' samarae

== Pests and diseases ==
'Horizontalis' is not known to be any less susceptible to Dutch elm disease than the species.

== Cultivation ==
The cultivar was found in a bed of seedling in the Perth Nursery, the plant was purchased by Booth of Hamburg, Germany, who then distributed it. Specimens supplied by the Späth nursery to the Royal Botanic Garden Edinburgh in 1902 as U. montana 'Horizontalis' may survive in Edinburgh as it was the practice of the Garden to distribute trees about the city (viz. the Wentworth Elm); the current list of Living Accessions held in the Garden per se does not list the plant.

'Horizontalis' was also known to have been marketed in Poland in the 19th century by the Ulrich nursery. Warsaw.

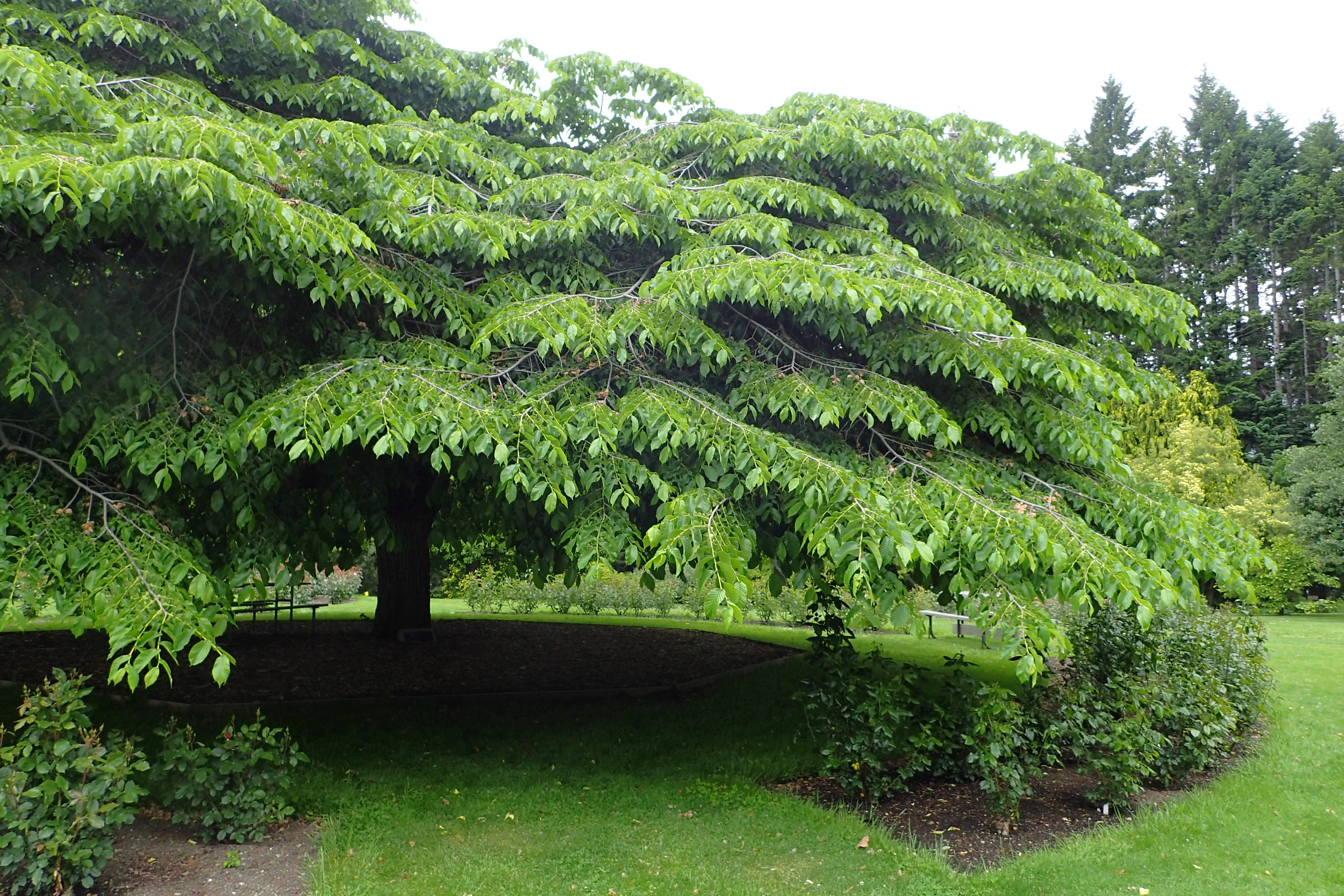
'Horizontalis', Queenstown Gardens, Queenstown, New Zealand (2017)

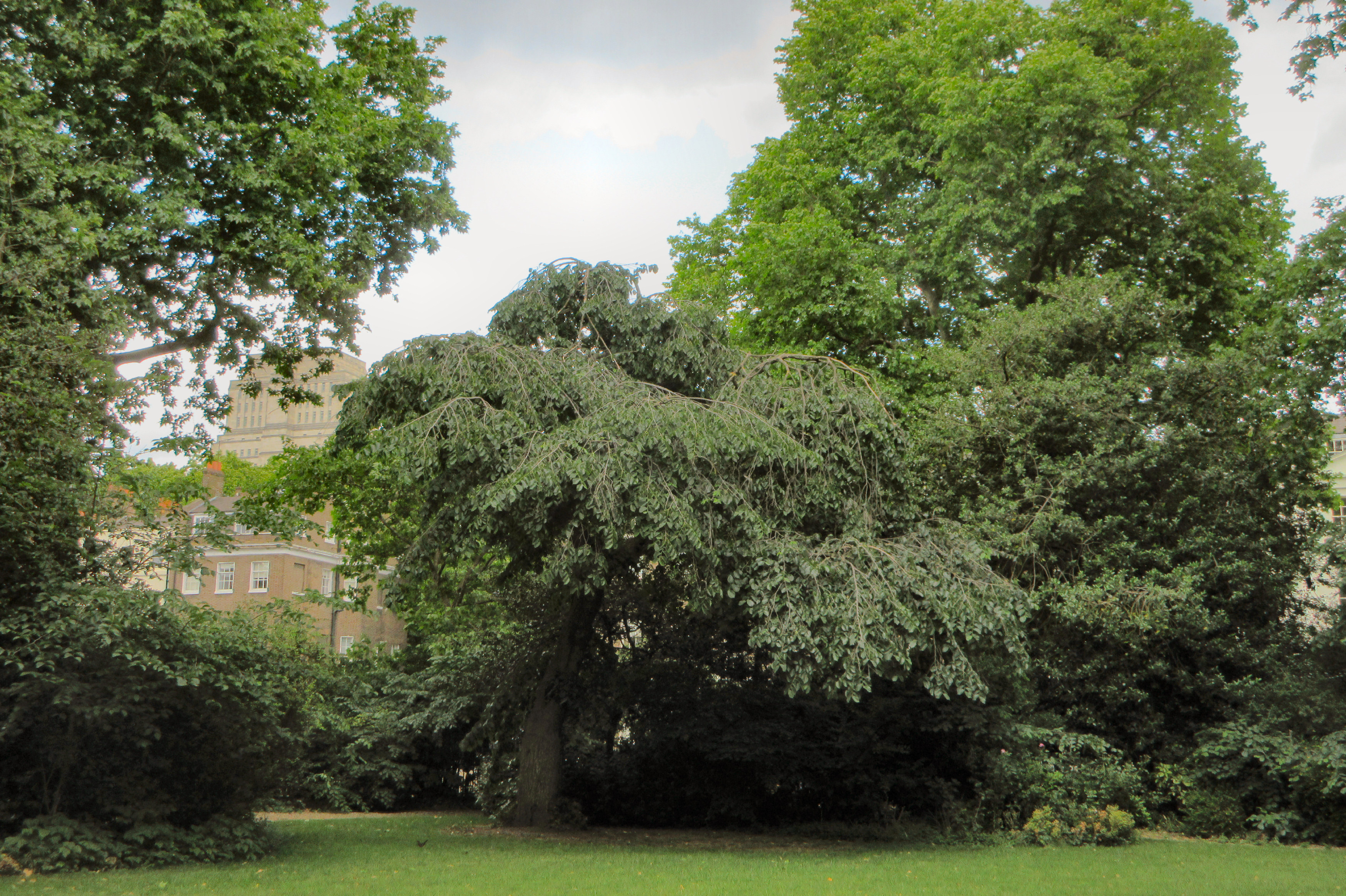
'Horizontalis', Bedford Square Gardens, London (2025)

== Notable trees ==
There are two notable T.R.O.B.I. "champion" trees in the British Isles: one at Rathmullan House, County Donegal, measuring 6 metres (20 ft) high by 114 centimetres (45 in) DBH in 2010, and the other at Glen Mooar, Isle of Man, measuring 14 metres (46 ft) high by 84 centimetres (33 in) DBH in 1998. A specimen in Christchurch, New Zealand (girth 365 cm, height 14.8 m), is described by Tree Register NZ as "a contender for world champion". It was incorrectly described as "the world's largest elm" in Mark Seddon and David Shreeve's Great British Elms (2024).

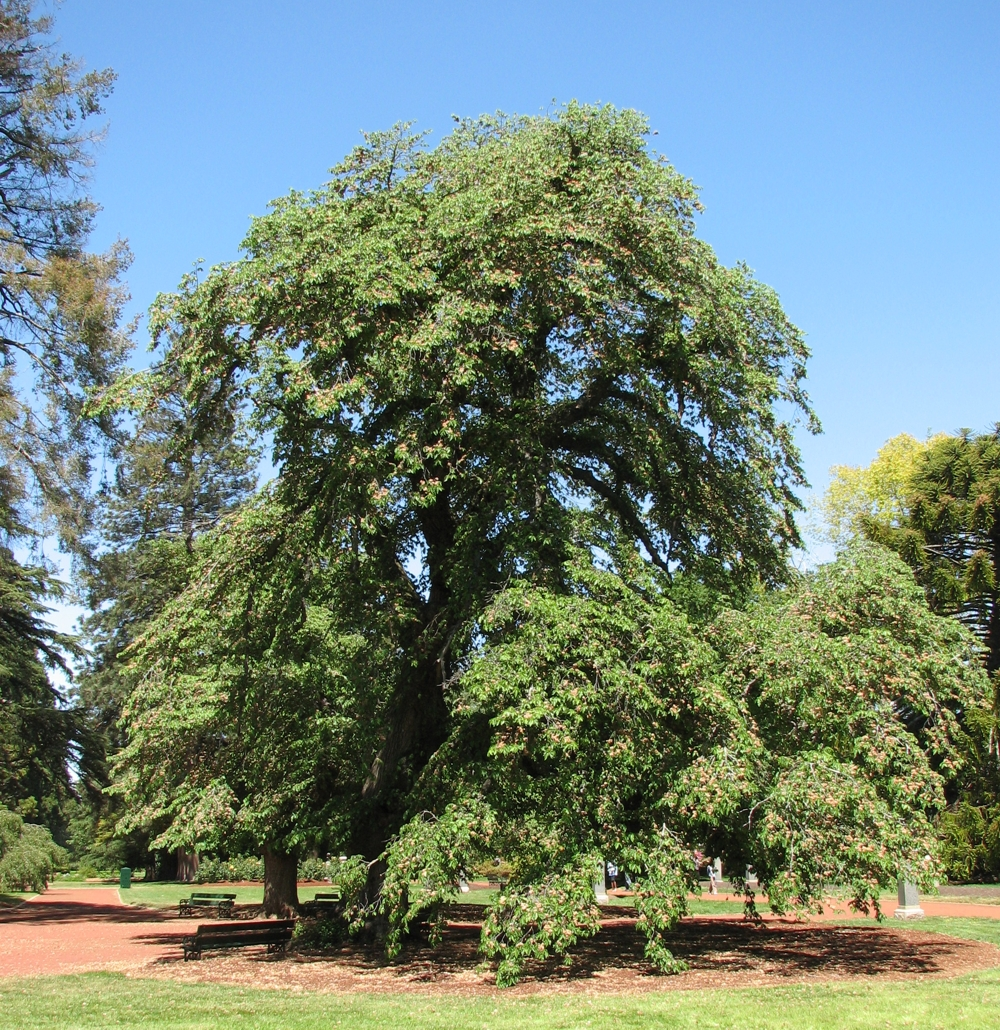
Old 'Horizontalis', Ballarat Botanical Garden, Australia

== Synonymy ==
- 'Tabletop Elm': Anon.
- Ulmus glabra 'Pendula' Anon.
- Ulmus montana (: glabra) var. decumbens: Masters, Hortus Duroverni, 67, 1831, name in synonymy.
- Ulmus montana (: glabra) var. pendula. Loddiges, (Hackney, London), Catalogue 1836, and Loudon, Arboretum et Fruticetum Britannicum, 3: 1398, 1838, also by Krüssmann in Parey Blumengartn. ed. 2, 1: 519, 1958, as a cultivar.
- Ulmus montana (: glabra) 'Parasol': Koch, Dendrologie; Bäume, Sträucher und Halbsträucher, welche in Mittel- und Nord- Europa im Freien kultivirt werden 2 (1): 417, 1872, name in synonymy.
- Ulmus pendulina: Sinclair, in Donn, Hortus Cantabrigensis ed. 12. 110, 1831, but without description.

== Varieties ==
A variegated sport of 'Horizontalis', 'Pendula Variegata', was in cultivation in the 19th and early 20th centuries, as U. montana pendula variegata.

== Accessions ==
North America

- Dawes Arboretum , Newark, Ohio, US. 2 trees, no acc. details available.
- Holden Arboretum, US. Acc. no. 55-1033 (as U. glabra 'Pendula').
- Morris Arboretum, University of Pennsylvania, US. Acc. no. 56-239-A

Europe

- Arboretum de La Petite Loiterie , Monthodon, France. No details available
- Brighton & Hove City Council, UK. NCCPG Elm Collection. Several trees, largest in Royal Pavilion Grounds.
- Dubrava Arboretum, Lithuania. No details available.
- Hortus Botanicus Nationalis, Salaspils, Latvia. Acc. nos. 18112, 18113, (as U. glabra 'Pendula').
- Linnaean Gardens of Uppsala, Finland. Acc. nos. 1976-1051, 1974-1111, 1977-1092 (as forma pendula, and 'Pendula' resp.).
- Sir Harold Hillier Gardens, Ampfield, Hampshire, UK; acc. no. 1977.5056
- Strona Arboretum Ulmus lamellosa, University of Life Sciences, Warsaw, Poland. Listed as Ulmus glabra 'Pendula'
- Tallinn Botanic Garden, Estonia . Listed as 'Pendula'; no accession details available.
- University of Copenhagen, Denmark. Listed as Ulmus glabra 'Pendula'; no accession details available.

=== Australasia ===
- Ballarat Botanical Gardens, Australia. One tree listed on the Significant Tree Register of the National Trust.
- Eastwoodhill Arboretum , Gisborne, New Zealand. 2 trees, details not known.
- Hascombe, Mount Macedon, Australia. 100 years old (2009).

== Nurseries ==
=== Europe ===
- Arboretum Waasland, Nieuwkerken-Waas, Belgium, (as U. glabra 'Pendula').
- Boomwekerijen 'De Batterijen', Ochten, Netherlands (as Ulmus glabra Pendula)
- Dulford Nurseries, Cullompton, Devon, UK (as Ulmus glabra 'Pendula')
- UmbraFlor , Spello, Italy (as Ulmus montana 'Pendula')
- Westerveld Boomkwekerij B.V., Opheusden, The Netherlands (as Ulmus glabra 'Pendula').

=== Australasia ===
- Established Tree Transplanters Pty. Ltd., Wandin, Victoria, Australia.
