= Hascombe garden =

Coordinates: 37°23′25″S 144°34′59″E

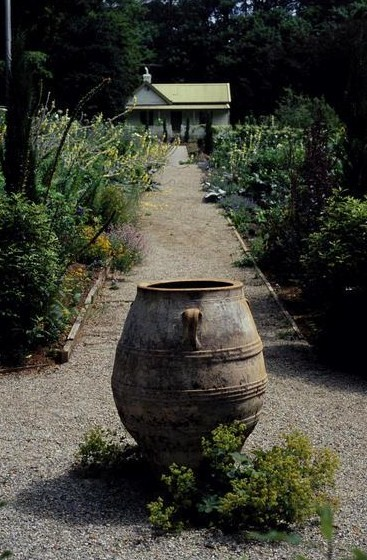

Hascombe is a nineteenth-century hill station garden located at Mount Macedon in Victoria, Australia. The 11 hectare garden, located on Alton Road, is regarded as one of Victoria's finest and is listed on the Register of the National Estate.

== History ==
R.L.J. Elery, the original owner, constructed a villa on the site in the 1870s. The garden was significantly expanded by R.S. Whiting who blended his design with the natural landscape of the creek and its backdrop of blackwoods and tree ferns. In the 1930s the owner at the time, S.Ricketson installed a log cabin, tennis courts and a Douglas Pine plantation. The garden was further developed by Sir Thomas and Lady Ramsay from the 1930s to 1989 when the garden was purchased by Paula and Lindsay Fox.

== Layout ==
The garden consists of a number of terraced levels with stone retaining walls. A system of pathways and steps link the various levels.

== Planting ==
The garden has a holly and linden walk, hedges comprising Pittosporum, Viburnum, Ilex and Eucryphia species. A "Picking Garden" displays a range of colourful flower varieties, while the "Woodland Garden" showcases spring bulbs.

Notable trees include a 100-year-old Horizontal Elm (Ulmus glabra 'Horizontalis') a Himalayan Fir (Abies pindrow) and a Cappadocian Maple (Acer cappadocicum).
