= Mount Macedon Memorial Cross =

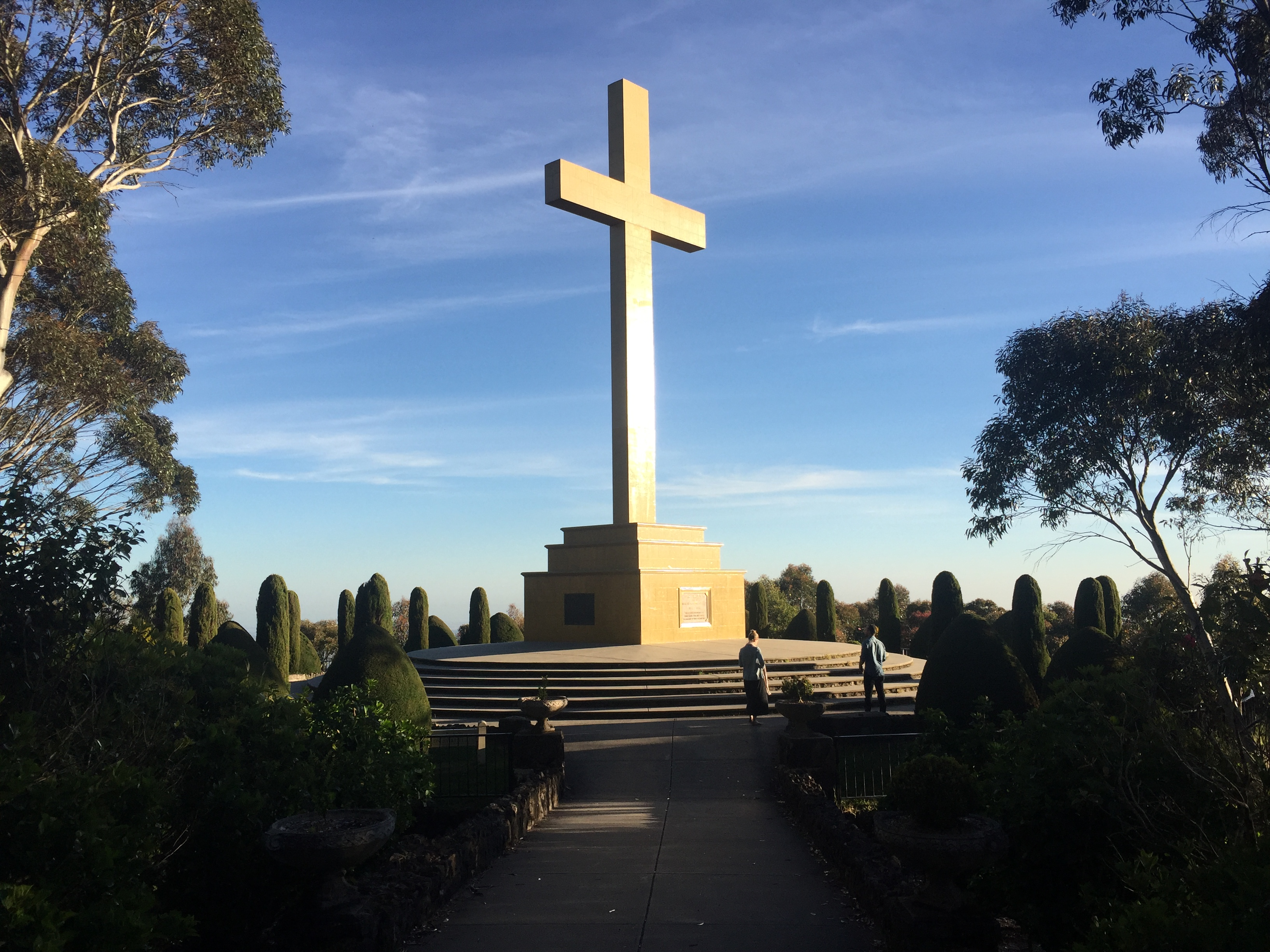
- Mount Macedon Memorial Cross, 2016

- Location within Victoria
- 37.388440°S 144.576070°E
- Location: 405 Cameron Drive, Mount Macedon, Macedon Ranges Shire, Victoria, Australia

History
- Built: 1935
- Built for: William Campbell

Victorian Heritage Register
- Official name: Macedon Cross
- Type: heritage place
- Designated: 1 September 1994
- Reference no.: VHR H1027

The Mount Macedon Memorial Cross is a heritage-listed war memorial at 405 Cameron Drive, Mount Macedon, Macedon Ranges Shire, Victoria, Australia. It is also known as the Cameron Memorial Cross. It was listed on the Victorian Heritage Register on 1 September 1994.

== History ==
The Mount Macedon Memorial Cross was planned and constructed for local land owner William Cameron. In addition to desiring to honour the war dead of World War I, Cameron wanted to create employment during the Great Depression. On Saturday 16 March 1935, the Victorian Premier, Stanley Argyle, officially dedicated the memorial to the Australian service people killed in the First World War. Over 400 people attended the ceremony despite the bitter wind and rain. The monument cost £10,000 which was paid by William Cameron except for £200 contributed by Gisborne Shire Council.

Although it withstood lightning strikes and bushfires over the years, eventually the cross's internal steel structure weakened and was assessed as being at risk of falling down. After a number of years of planning, in 1995 the monument was replaced with a visually identical replica but was constructed with solid reinforced concrete which is expected to be longer lasting.

== Description ==
The cross is in a reserve near the summit of Mount Macedon and is reached by a 2.5-mile (4.0 km) access road. The cross is 70 feet (21 m) high with a 14-foot (4.3 m) plinth and rests on a circular base 38 feet (12 m) in diameter. It is constructed of pale yellow Wunderlich terracotta tiles on a steel base. It can be seen from a great distance from the plains below the mountain.

A tablet on the monument has the words: "To the glory of God and in memory of Australia's sons, 1914-1918. Death cannot rob them of their glory nor time efface the memory of their gallant deeds."

== Significance ==
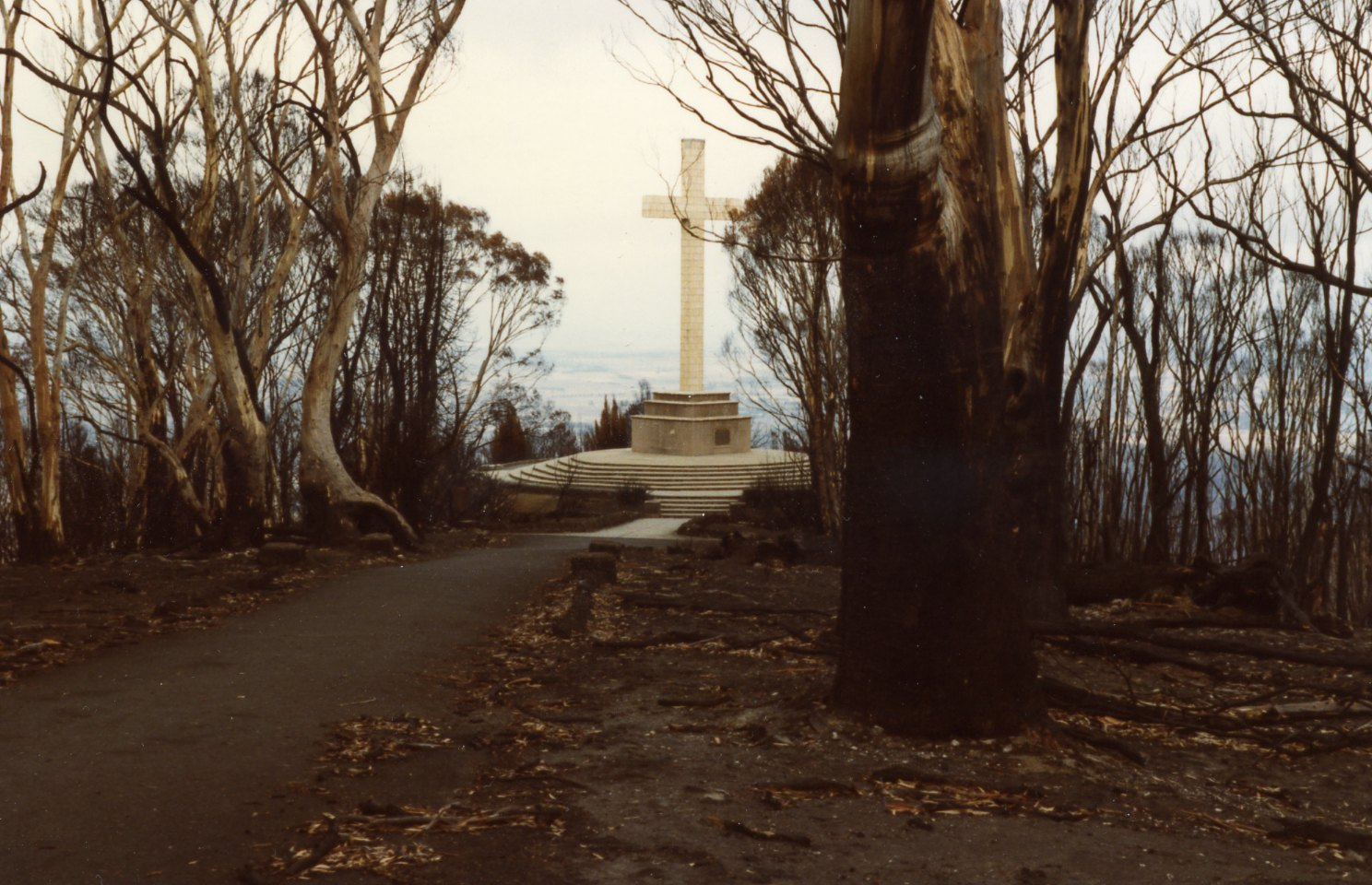
The cross after the 1983 Ash Wednesday bushfires

The Mount Macedon (Cameron) Memorial Cross is important for spiritual, symbolic cultural and social reasons. The Cross is important as a memorial for those who lost their lives in the First World War and became for many a symbol of courage and survival after the 1983 Ash Wednesday bushfires. The war dead are commemorated at a dawn service held at the base of the cross on Anzac Day each year. The size, simplicity of the design of the Cameron Memorial Cross, along with its siting on Mount Macedon, is a rare example of a memorial commemorating those who died in the First World War. It is able to demonstrate an association with an important event in Victoria's history, the First World War, and it demonstrates the use of particular material in the form of Wunderlich tiles which, because of their reflective nature, are able to enhance the simplicity and symbolism of the Cross, and enable it to be viewed from considerable distances.

It is considered Victoria's most significant war memorial after the Shrine of Remembrance in Melbourne.
