= Mount Macedon, Victoria =

Mount Macedon
- Town
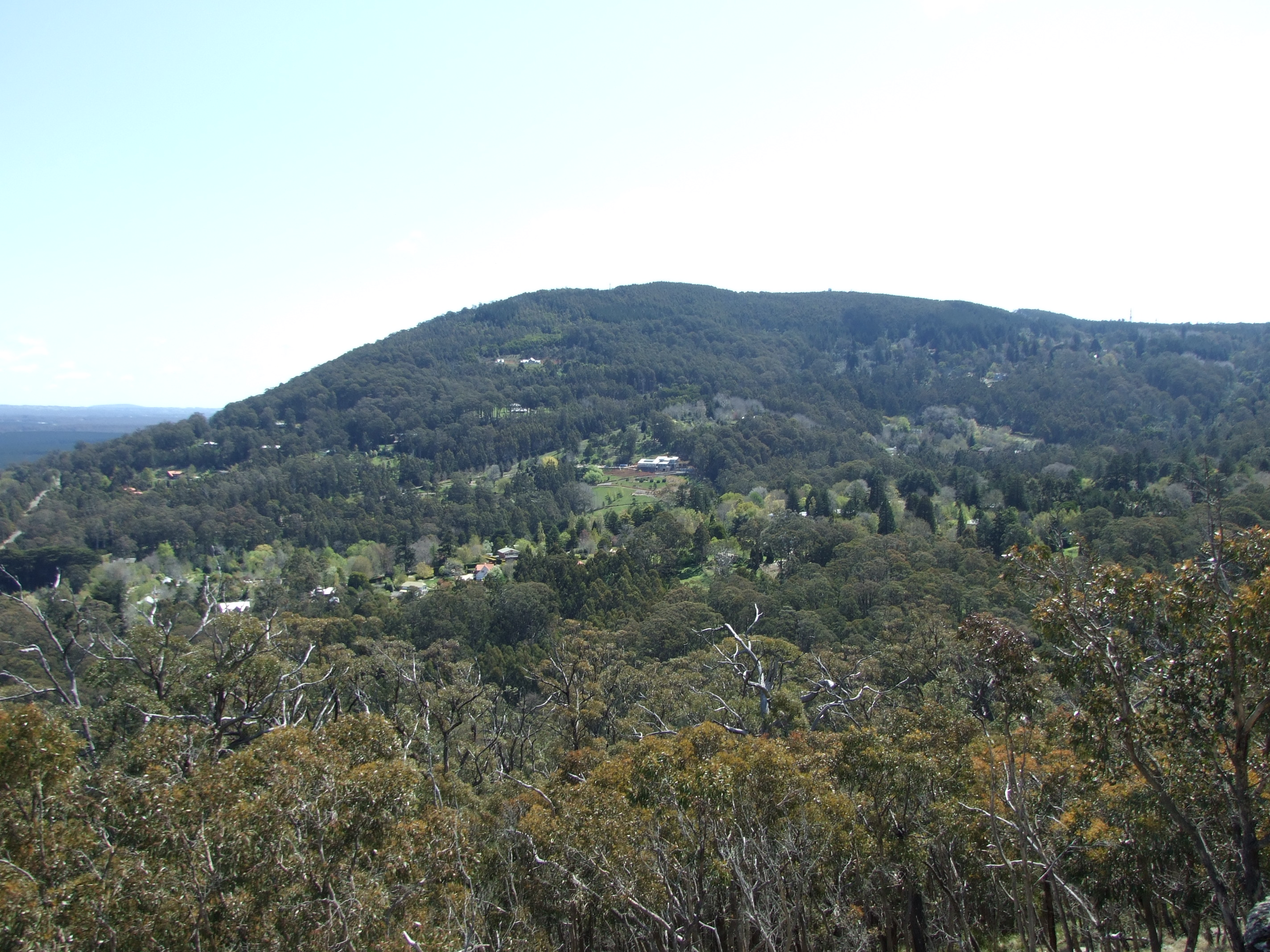
- Mount Macedon village from nearby Mount Towrong

- Coordinates: 37°24′S 144°35′E
- Country: Australia
- State: Victoria
- LGA: Shire of Macedon Ranges
- Location: 64 km (40 mi) from Melbourne; 7 km (4.3 mi) from Macedon

Government
  - State electorate: Macedon
  - Federal division: McEwen
- Elevation: 615 m (2,018 ft)

Population
  - Total: 1,335 (2016 census)
- Postcode: 3441
Localities around Mount Macedon
Woodend	Woodend	Newham
Macedon	Mount Macedon	Riddells Creek
Macedon	Gisborne	New Gisborne

Mount Macedon (/ˈmæsədən/ MASS-ə-dən) is a town 64 kilometres (40 mi) north-west of Melbourne in the Australian state of Victoria. The town is located below the mountain of the same name, which rises to 1,001 metres (3,284 ft) AHD. At the 2016 census, Mount Macedon had a population of 1,335 and is best known for its collection of 19th-century gardens and associated extravagant large homes.

The Mount Macedon gardens area is considered by the National Trust of Australia (Victoria) to be of National Significance, as an area containing gardens and properties of outstanding significance, with a "wide range of rare and unusual trees and plants, probably the best concentration of such vegetation in Victoria outside the Royal Botanic Gardens", featuring "surviving examples of work of some of Victoria's most important garden designers" and as such, it is "the most representative area of hill station gardens in Victoria, and with Mount Wilson and the Adelaide Hills, amongst the best in Australia".

== Features and location ==
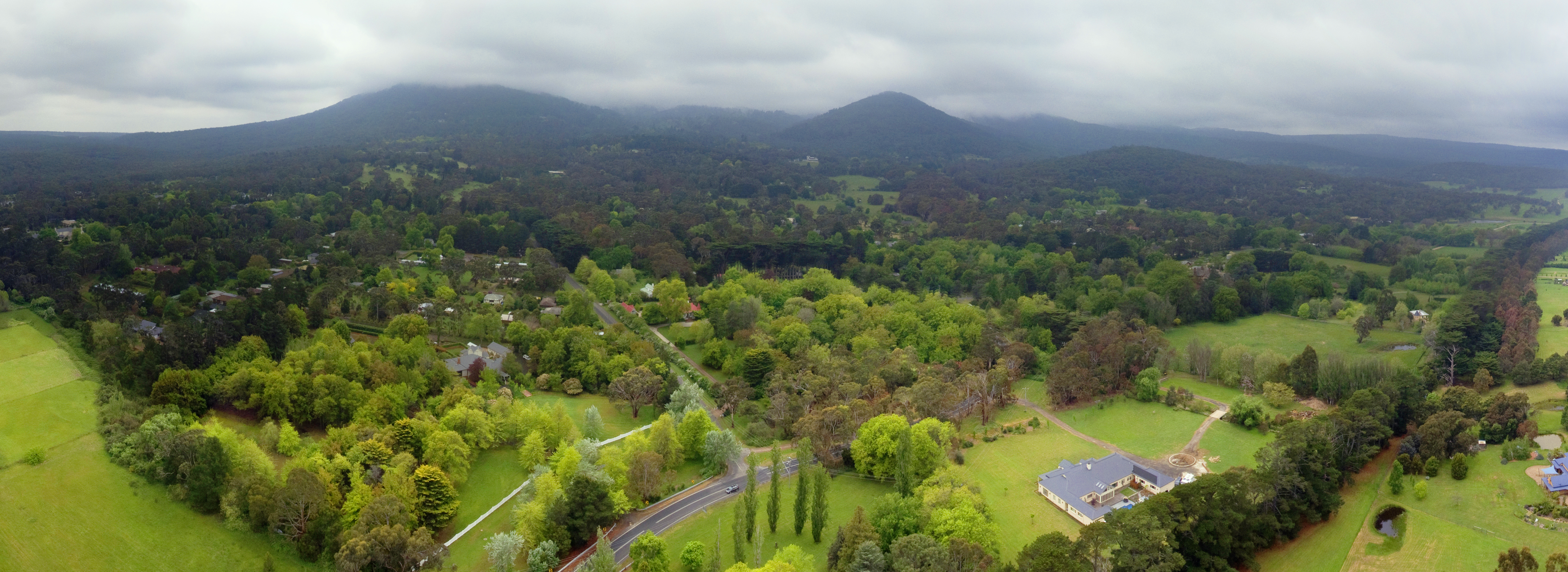
Mount Macedon as seen from the air 100m up on a misty spring afternoon

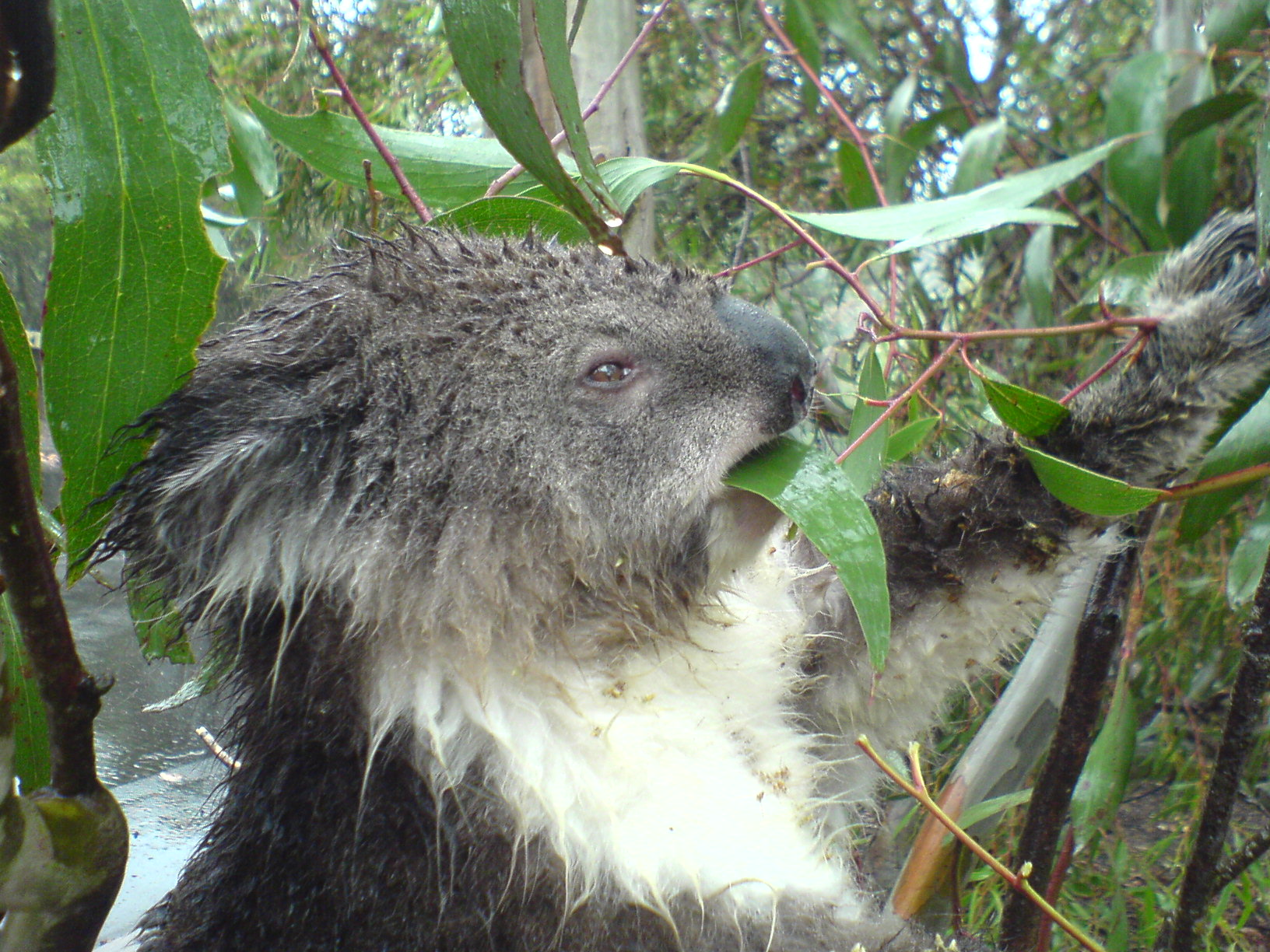
A wild Koala on the edge of the car park atop Mount Macedon

Mount Macedon township was largely established by Melbourne's wealthy elite in the post-gold rush era of the mid to late 19th century who used it as a summer retreat. The post office opened on 18 July 1870, known as Upper Macedon until 1879 and Macedon Upper until 1936. An earlier (1843) post office (previously) named Mount Macedon is located in Kyneton. It was renamed Kyneton (post office) on 1 January 1854. Kyneton.

Due to its relatively high elevation of approximately 620 metres (2,030 ft) AHD, the area experiences much cooler temperatures on average relative to nearby Melbourne. The area also receives high rainfall relative to the surrounding plains and much of the Melbourne area. This combination of geographic factors has contributed to the town's reputation as a resort town and wine region.

Snowfall is a fairly regular feature on the higher elevations of the mountain, although the peak of the mountain is marginally too low for snowfalls to lie on the ground for more than a few days in most instances. Occasionally, the lower parts of the town experience snowfalls and on occasion these have been substantial.

The gardens and homes of Mount Macedon are well known for their size and scale, some of which contain collections of exotic plants that are rare in cultivation.

== Mountain ==
The mountain is known as Geboor or Geburrh in the Aboriginal Woiwurrung language of the Wurundjeri people.

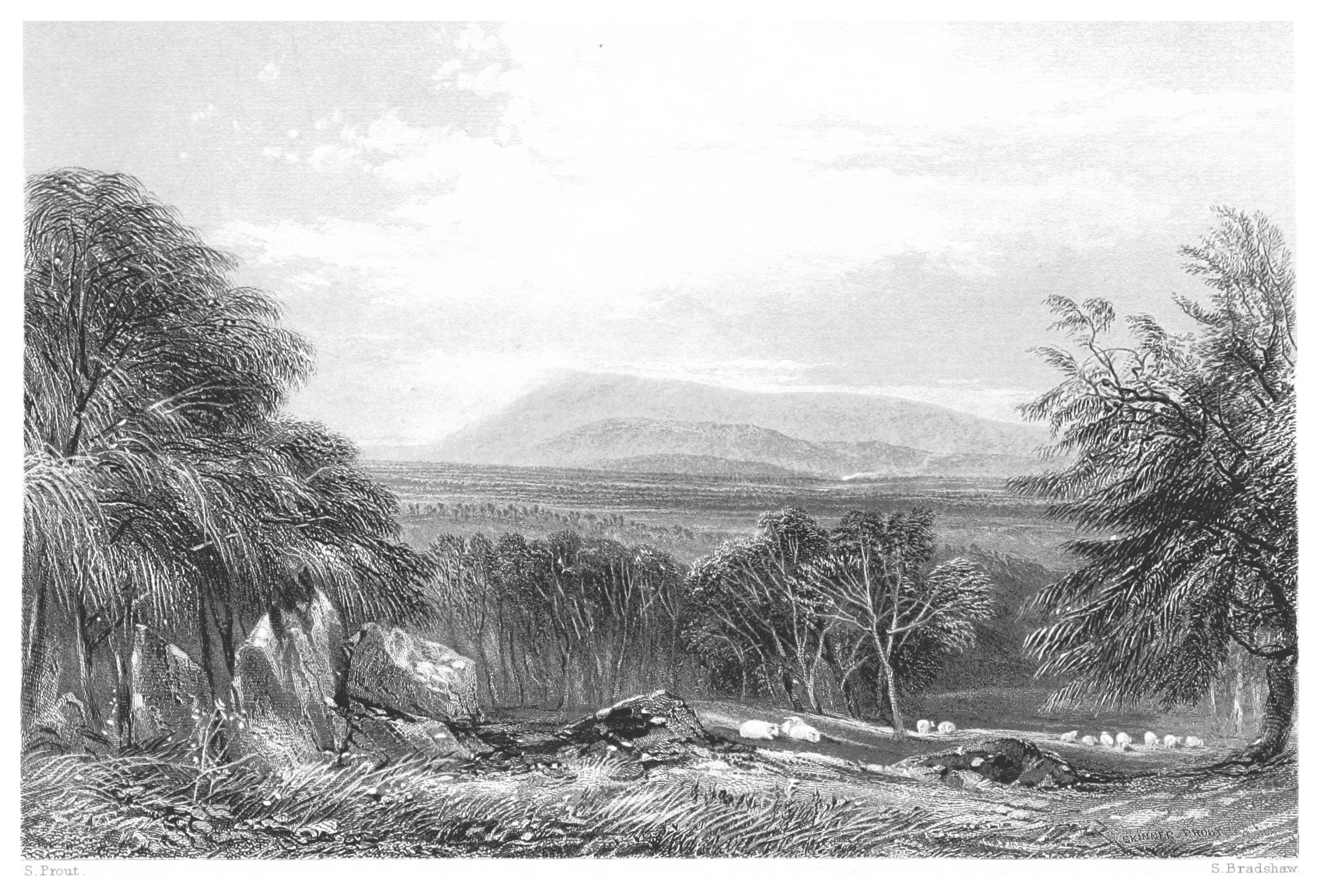
1.146 Mount Macedon, Victoria by Edwin Carton Booth (1873)

The Mount Macedon area also comprises a second important peak, the Camel's Hump or Camels Hump, rising to 1,011 metres (3,317 ft) above sea level. The volcanic trachyte rock of the crag is used by rock climbers and the mountain has become a sport climbing venue due to its proximity to Melbourne.

== History ==
The mountain was sighted by Hamilton Hume and William Hovell on their 1824 expedition to Port Phillip from NSW. They named it Mount Wentworth.

It was renamed Mount Macedon by explorer Major Thomas Mitchell who ascended the mountain in 1836. He named it after Philip of Macedon in honour of the fact that he was able to view Port Phillip from the summit. Several other geographic features along the path of his third Australia Felix expedition were named after figures of Ancient Macedonia including the nearby Campaspe River and Mount Alexander near Castlemaine (named after Alexander the Great).

=== Heritage ===
==== Government house ====
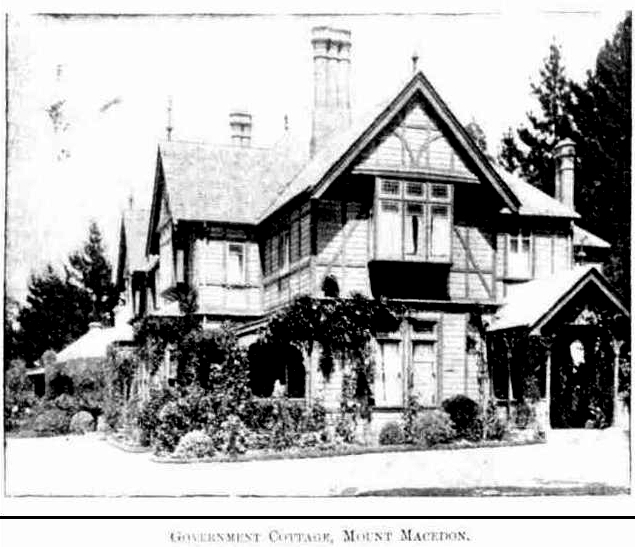
Government Cottage, Mount Macedon, 1896

The newspaper proprietor, David Syme, built 'Rosenheim' on 24 hectares in 1869. It was acquired in 1886 for successive Victoria Governors. The state parliament approved funds of £12,000 to purchase a Government house near the top of Mount Macedon as the location of the official summer residence of the Governor of Victoria in the late 1880s. It was renovated in 1892. By the 1930s the residence was commonly referred to as Government Cottage. The residence was described in 1933 as an "estate consists of slightly more than 54 acres at Upper Macedon, two and a half miles from the Macedon railway station. There is a two-storied wooden building of 31 rooms, besides four bathrooms and six storerooms, as well as six detached rooms for servants' quarters, an entrance lodge containing, four rooms and stabling and garage."

The official residence and land was sold for £5,600 in 1934 via public auction to raise funds in the post-Depression economy and as the Premier at the time, Sir Stanley Argyle, said "the estate no longer justified itself because none of the recent Governors had made much use of it". See section below in Notable Houses.

==== Barbours Tramway and Log Chute ====
The heritage-listed Barbours Tramway and Log Chute is located on the northern slopes of Mount Macedon inside the Macedon Regional Park. It was constructed around 1856, to remove logs from the plateau down to Robert Barbour's Black Forest Sawmill. The tramway brought logs to the head of a chute above the mill. Remnants of the tramway include "a substantial cutting and embankment, and a well-defined chute impression extending about 500 metres down the mountain".

The site is the oldest known log chute in Victoria and one of the oldest extant sections of tramway in Victoria

==== Macedon Sanatorium for Consumptives ====
Mount Macedon was the site of the controversial Macedon Sanatorium for Consumptives, which treated Tuberculosis patients in the early 20th century. It was opened in 1898 and was described in The Age at the time "on the slope of one of the hills in Upper Macedon, about 2500 feet above sea level, in a climate which has been tested for many years, and proved exceedingly efficacious in cases of lung disease". The site, which covered 200-300 acres, was sold by the state government "in small blocks for residential purposes" in 1910.

==== Annis and George Bills Horse Trough ====
Situated on Mt Macedon Road is an example of an Annis & George Bills Horse Trough, which was installed by a memorial trust set up by Mr George Bills. It is one of 500 horse troughs donated free of charge to towns across NSW and Victoria to grant Mr. Bill's wish that "no animals to go thirsty".

==== Australian Civil Defence School ====
The Australian Civil Defence School was opened at Mount Macedon on 2nd July 1956 by Hon Allen Fairhall, MP, the Commonwealth Minister for the Interior and Works, who said it satisfied the "need for a civil defence program aimed at offering maximum protection from the effects of hostilities on Australian soil to all Australians". Instructional courses began in 1956 with training centred on protection of the civil population against hostile acts. After the late 1960s the focus changed to natural and man-made disasters. It was renamed to the Australian Emergency Management Institute (AEMI) in 1993. The Abbott federal government decided to close the AEMI in 2015 and transition it into a Canberra-based "virtual" institute, citing a budget saving of $900,000.

== Attractions ==
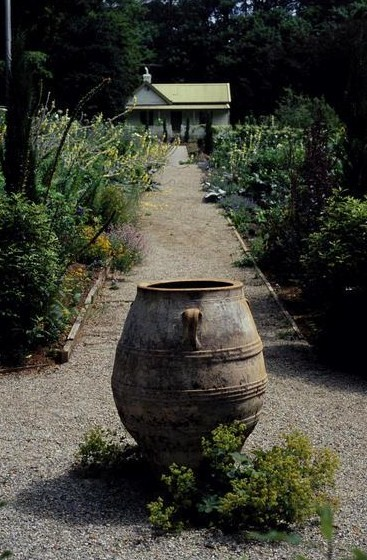
Garden path to cottage at Hascombe, Mount Macedon.

=== Memorial Cross ===
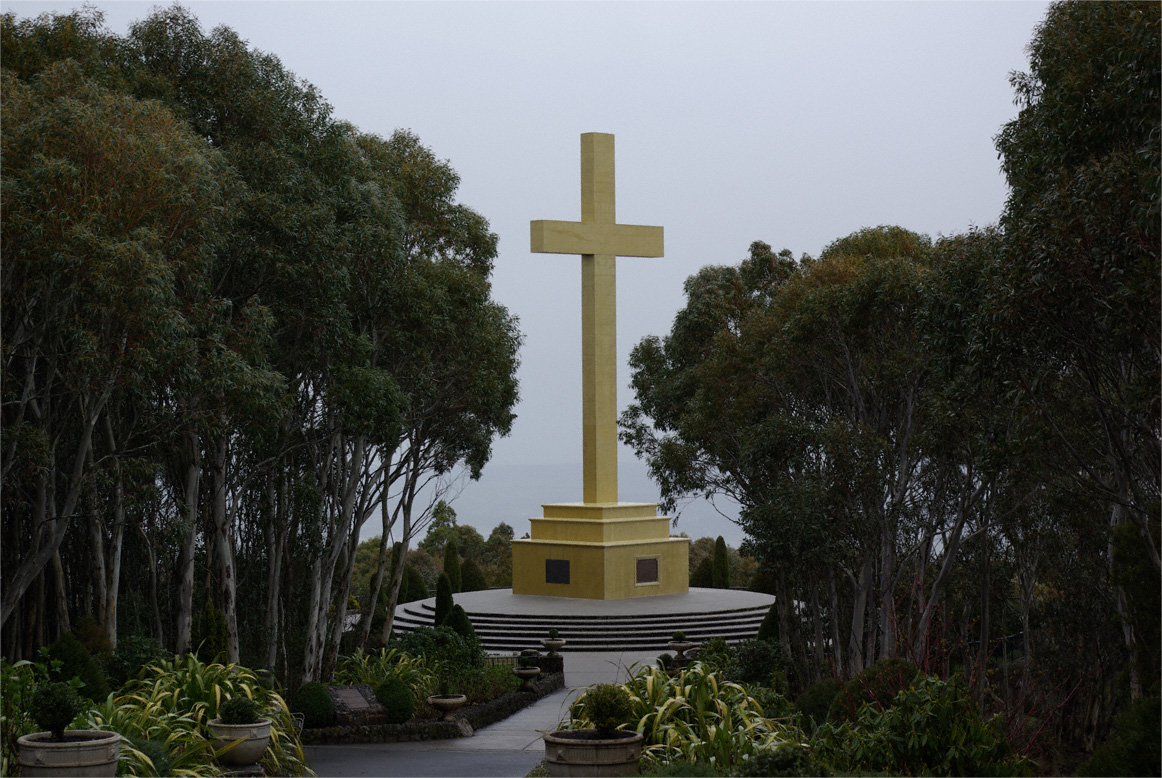
The Mount Macedon Memorial Cross

One of the major attractions of Mount Macedon is the 21-metre (69 ft) high memorial cross which stands near the summit of the mountain. This structure was established by early resident William Cameron in 1935 as a memorial to those who died in World War I. The view from the summit of Mount Macedon takes in Melbourne city, the Dandenong Ranges and the You Yangs near Geelong.

=== Forestry ===
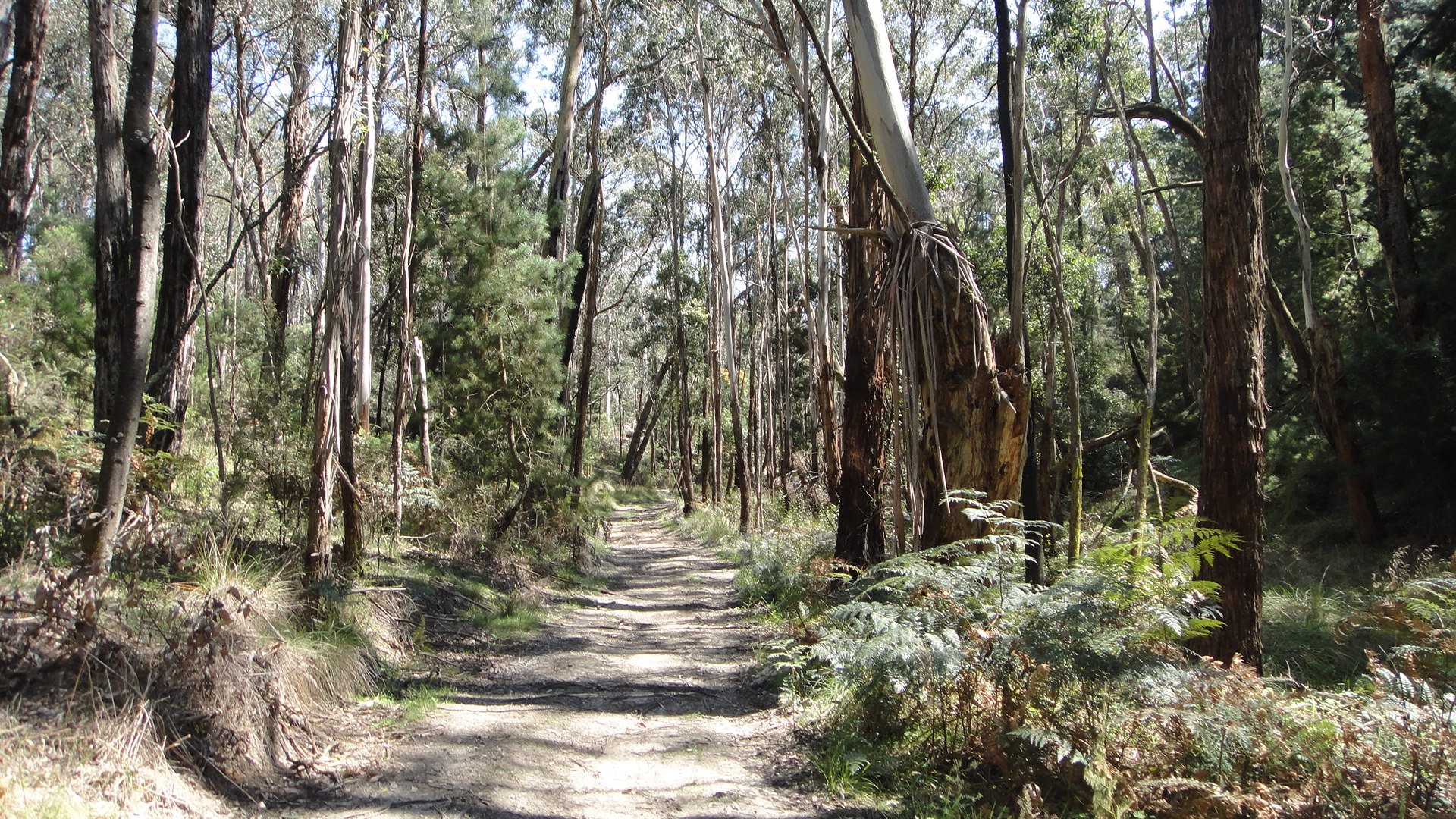
Mount Macedon Forest

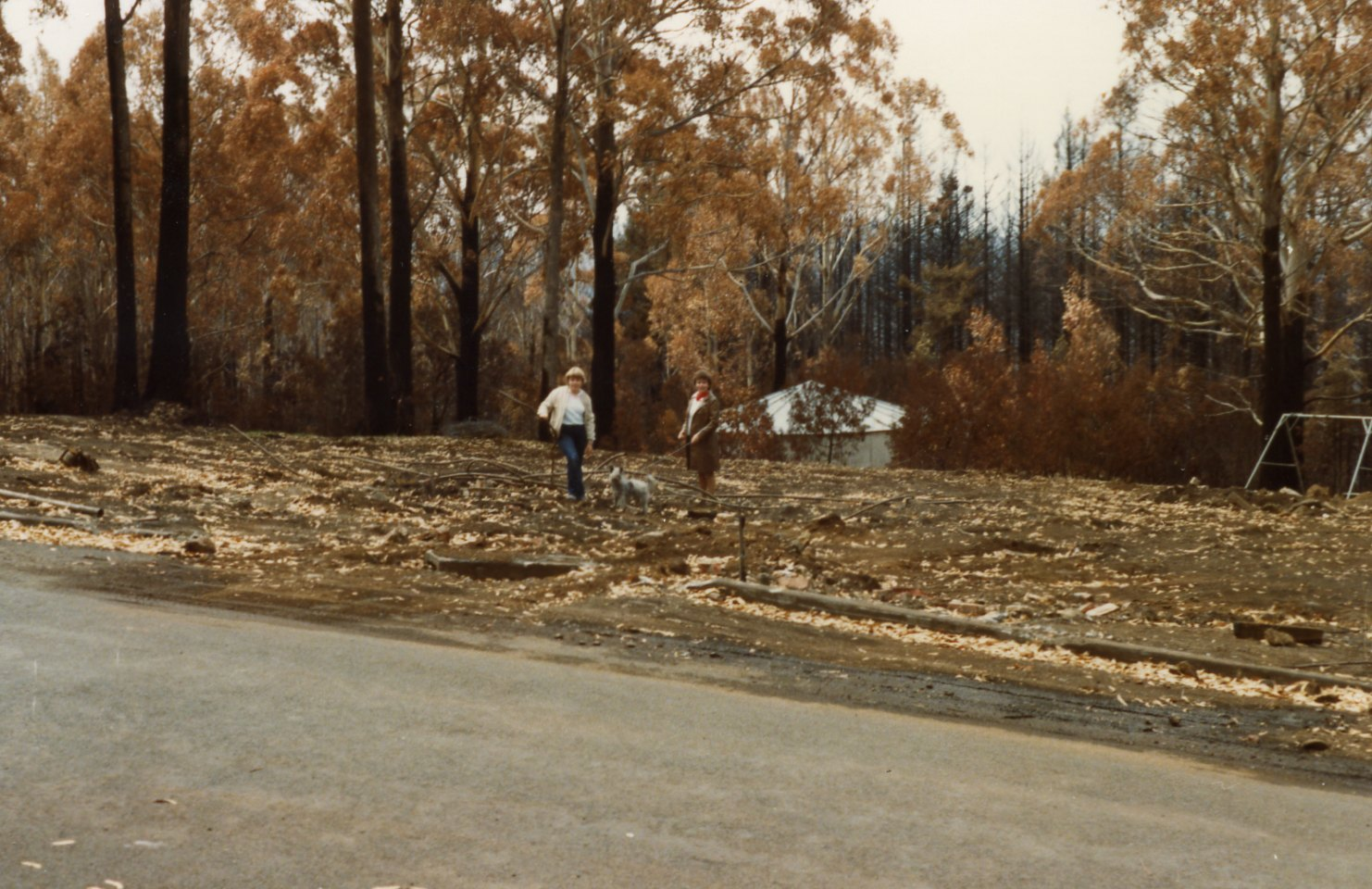
Mount Macedon after the 1983 Ash Wednesday bushfires

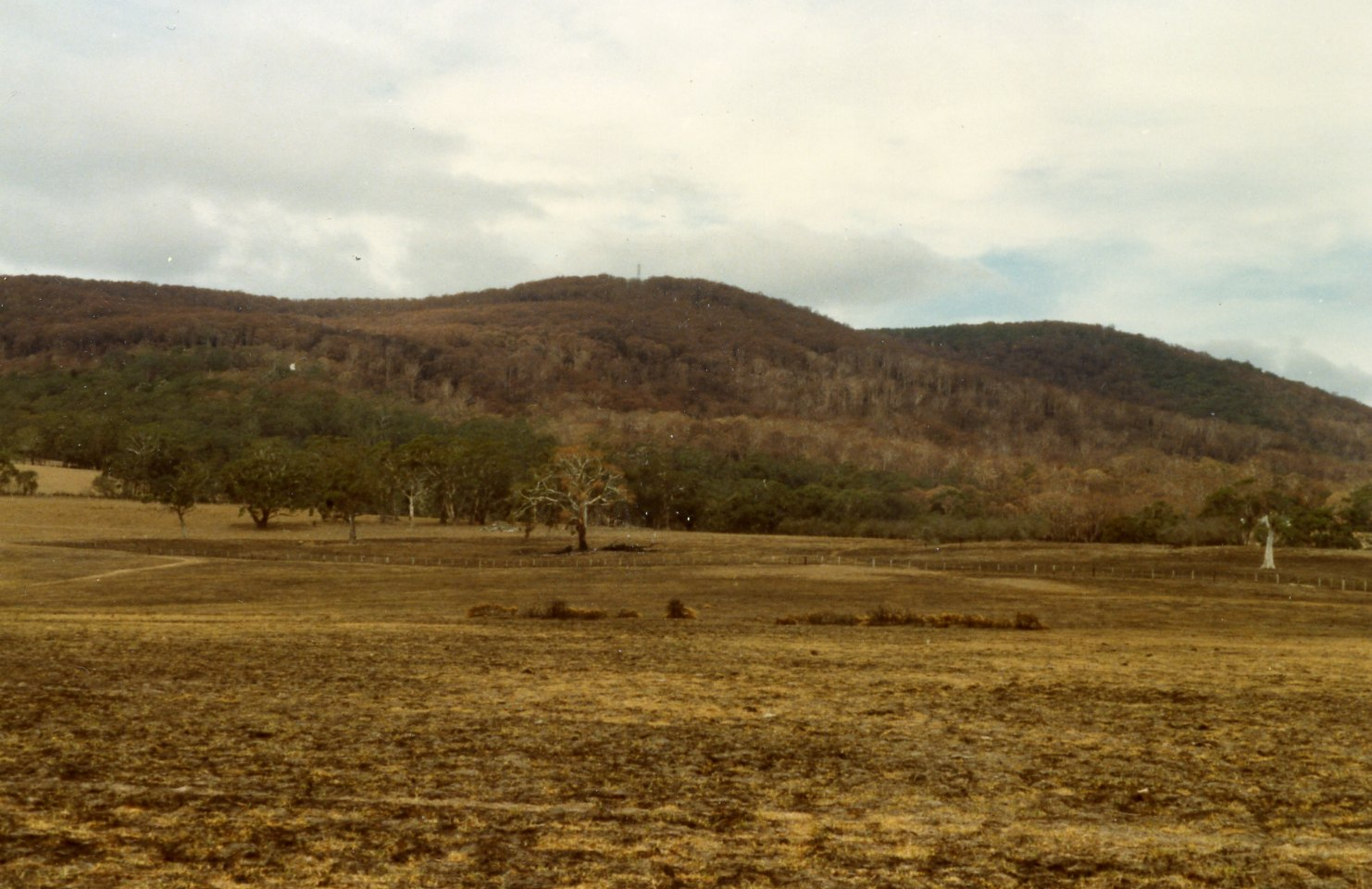
Burnt paddocks and bushland at Mount Macedon after the 1983 Ash Wednesday bushfires

Another attraction of the Mount Macedon area is the extensive native forests that cover the mountain and surround the town.

Intense harvesting of the native timber on the slopes of Mount Macedon for building and use in the gold mining industry in the early 19th century resulted in the rapid deforestation of the area, to the extent that efforts to replant the forests were undertaken in the late 1880s.

Much of the forest on Mount Macedon consists of wet sclerophyll communities which are more commonly associated with areas east of Melbourne. Alpine ash (Eucalyptus delegatensis) occurs here at the western extent of its range and mountain ash (Eucalyptus regnans) at the northwestern extent of its range. Snow gums (Eucalyptus pauciflora) are also found on the highest peaks. A large area of the Macedon Ranges forest is included in the Macedon Regional Park, managed by Parks Victoria.

The area was devastated by the 1983 Ash Wednesday fires, including 80 hectares of snow gum (Eucalyptus pauciflora) and alpine ash (Eucalyptus delegatensis) and 150 hectares of soft wood timber plantation; however, the forests and gardens have since regrown.

=== Honour Avenue ===
Over 150 oak trees line the famous Honour Avenue, located in the heart of the town at the base of Mount Macedon. In autumn, particularly between March and May, the oak trees turn bright with colour, attracting significant amounts of tourists and visitors. Honour Avenue may be closed for cars during peak season to allow visitors to walk its length.

=== Victorian Emergency Management Institute ===
The Victorian Emergency Management Institute (VEMI) is located on Mt Macedon Road and was opened in 2018. It is operated by the Victorian government's Emergency Management Victoria (EMV) to provide training to Victoria's emergency management organisations and community groups. The 6.5 ha site, which was occupied by the Commonwealth's former Australian Emergency Management Institute from 1956 to 2015, has 52 rooms of accommodation, a 75-seat lecture theatre as well as teaching facilities.

=== Notable houses ===
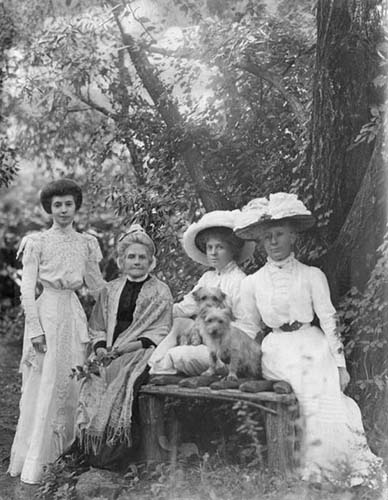
Ellis Rowan with her mother Marian Ryan, and sisters Mabel and Blanche Ryan in the garden at Derriweit Heights c. 1885

- Alton – an 1870s-built Venetian Gothic house. Gardens make up four hectares (9.9 acres) of the 10.5-hectare (26-acre) holding. Alton is listed in the Victorian Heritage Database as "the best surviving example of an Old English style building in Australia, especially in its use of hung wall tiles and its staged construction". The original 18 acres of the property had been reserved by the Government for the future site for the Governor's country, however, the expenses of erecting Government House in Melbourne were so great that the idea of erecting a country house for the Governor near the top of Macedon was delayed for many years. Sir George Federic Verdon purchased the land in 1874 and through purchase of neighbouring holdings, enlarged the property to its current size of 26 acres. The current Alton House, named after Alton Tower in England, was built after a bushfire destroyed the previous 1872 built timber cottage and initial garden improvements in late 1876. The property included a nine-tee golf course, tennis court and croquet lawn. The garden includes the "best private collection of large conifers anywhere in Victoria" and 24 National Trust recognised trees.
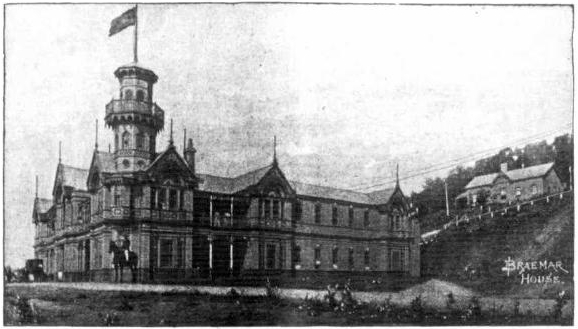
- Braemar House, Mt Macedon 1895
  Braemar House, 1499 Mount Macedon Road, Woodend – currently occupied by Braemar College, this heritage-listed substantial two-storey timber mansion on brick and stone foundations with high pitched roofs, intricate gables and asymmetric features, was constructed as a "first-class hotel" for Broken Hill Silver King investors in 1889–90 by the Macedon North Estate Company to a design by Italian-born architect Louis Boldini. The main building was constructed to include 56 bedrooms "many of them large enough for two bedsteads". A newspaper report during construction also described "Beside the principal building there are in course of construction the billiard room building on the hill, facing the back of the house, and also farther away the steam engine room, the stables, coach house and the washhouse; all the buildings are supplied with water from the reservoir. All the rooms of the house have electric bells, and speaking tubes are provided where necessary for the service of the house". Braemar House is also historically important for its association with Clyde Girls' Grammar School, a private girls' boarding school, which operated at the site from 1918 to 1976. Clyde School became well known for its depiction in the Joan Lindsay novel Picnic at Hanging Rock (1967). This novel was concerned with an ill-fated excursion to Hanging Rock by girls from the local boarding school.
- Campaspe Country House, Goldies Lane, Woodend – a former notable house convert into an upscale hotel in a 1927 Federation Arts and Crafts manor, and with its annex, that sits on 13 hectares (32 acres) of landscaped gardens and bushland
- Derriweit Heights, Douglas Road, Mount Macedon, circa 1874 – the original 26-hectare (65-acre) garden was designed by Von Mueller and Guilfoyle . Derriweit Heights was the first homestead to be built near the peak of Mount Macedon by Charles Ryan (circa 1874) to capture the views over Port Phillip Bay and create a world-class garden. The original home was largely destroyed by the Ash Wednesday fires in 1983. The house has been rebuilt in French Provincial style although still retaining the original coach wing. After various owners, the property was purchased by Dr Paul and Mrs Anne Mulkearns in 2016. They have commenced a five-year rejuvenation plan to return the garden to its original splendour; uncovering many of the original Derriweit garden features.
- Drusilla – an imposing red brick two storey Federation Queen Anne House, was built as a residence for the Grimwade family and later became the training centre for the Marist Brothers from 1948 till 1976.
- Duneira Estate and Garden – Duneira is of historical, architectural, botanical and horticultural significance, and is listed in the Victorian Heritage Database as one of the few examples of "surviving Mount Macedon hill station properties, developed by some of the most prominent and wealthy citizens of Victoria in the late nineteenth and early twentieth centuries". The land for historic Duneira was purchased in the early 1870s by the pastoralist Suetonius Henry Officer: four allotments in May 1872, and a fifth allotment to the north in 1877. The property boundaries remain unaltered, with the exception of some excision of land by the Country Roads Board in 1958. In the centre of the property are the stables built in 1874, the residence and servants' quarters constructed in 1875-76 and a service block to the rear built c1913, a milking shed complex and garden buildings.
- Fontainebleau – originally built in the late nineteenth century, probably in Melbourne, and was moved to Mount Macedon and purchased in 1901 as a home for his family by the artist Frederick McCubbin (1855–1917). He named it after the forests near Paris where the Barbizon painters had worked. The McCubbin family lived there for five years, with McCubbin continuing to work in Melbourne but spending weekends and holidays at Fontainebleau, even after the family's move back to Melbourne in 1907.
- Karori – a 2.4-hectare (6-acre) hill station property on the Southern slopes of Mount Macedon. Karori was built in 1888 as the summer retreat of Charles William Chapman, a mining and pastoral investor from New Zealand (NZ). Chapman imported many materials for the house and trees for the garden. He also brought over Italian-born and NZ-based architect Louis Boldini to design the house, which bears some resemblance to the highly decorative wooden homes found in NZ. Boldini, who designed many buildings in Dunedin in the 1880s, also designed nearby guesthouse Braemar, in which Chapman also held a financial interest.
- Marnanie – entered through a long driveway under a treed canopy and is one of Mount Macedon's Historic Homes and a hill station property. It was (possibly rebuilt as) a large gracious weatherboard Federation style home. Constructed in 1890, this was once the home of the first Australian-born Governor-General, Sir Isaac Isaacs, at was also the primary residence of Kevin O’Neill - a prominent society florist and gardener.
- Penola – a majestic 19th-century garden estate of 4.5 hectares (11.2 acres) on the Witch Creek, established by the Mary Guilfoyle (sister of William Guilfoyle) and her husband Prof. John Elkington c. 1881. The notable Victorian residence of 20 rooms was prefabricated in Singapore using teak and pine and was originally located in East Melbourne. It has a rare original billiards room, 2 grand living rooms, 8 bedrooms and 8 open fireplaces. There are six acres of terraced gardens, stone walls, ponds, waterfall and a lawn tennis court. The home was owned by the family of William Brookes from 1899 to 1951. Penola has views to Port Phillip Bay and Melbourne.
- Sefton – a large, grand Federation Arts and Crafts styled residence of 20 beds and 18 bathrooms and has survived the many fires. Sefton was built by the William Baillieu as a summer holiday home in the early 1900s, and the 8.8-hectare English garden was laid out with the obvious influences of the Melbourne Royal Botanic Gardens directors Baron von Mueller and W. R. Guilfoyle.
- Shepherd's Bush – a grand Victorian weatherboard summer residence built for the Wall family, located at 865 metres (2,838 ft) above sea level. An 1.2-hectare (3.0-acre) garden on a four-hectare (9.9-acre) property, the residence included a tennis court and stables. The residence was destroyed on 1 February 1983, but the garden lives on today and is cared for by its current owners.
- Timsbury – a splendid example of the hill station genre; built-in 1875 in the voguish “gingerbread” style, with carved wooden latticework and decorative verandahs. For several years it has been home to businessman Tim Shaw and his doctor wife Bronwyn.

=== Private gardens ===
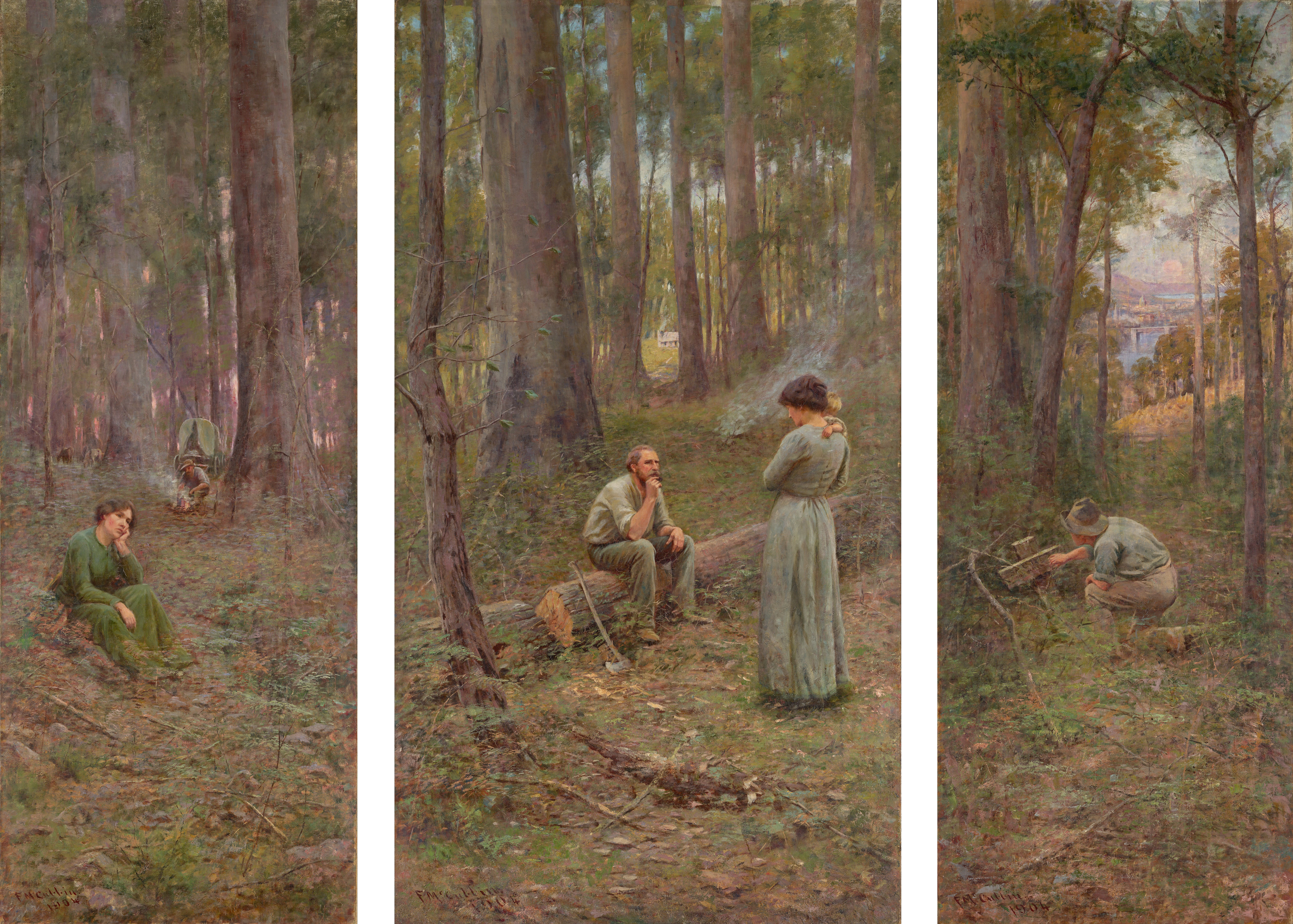
Frederick McCubbin, The pioneer

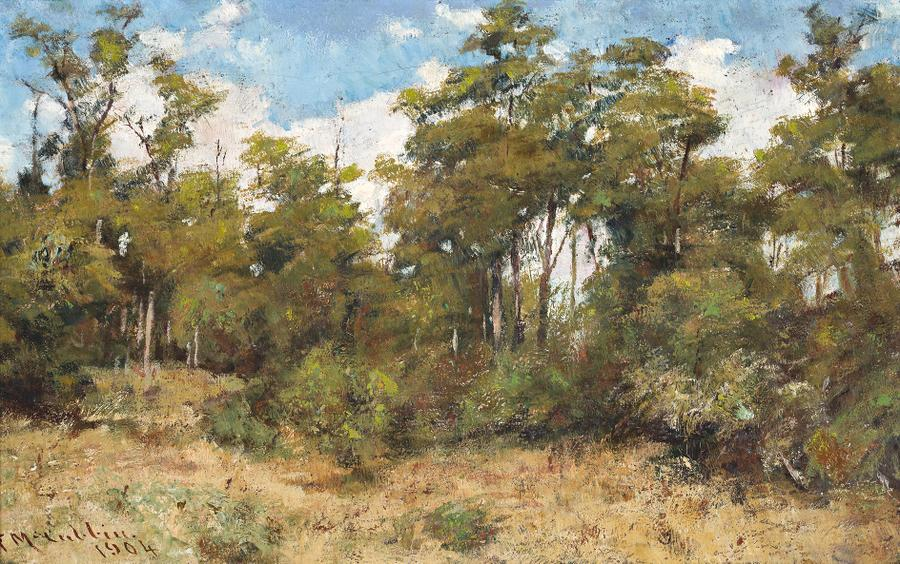
Frederick McCubbin - Gum trees, Mount Macedon (1904)

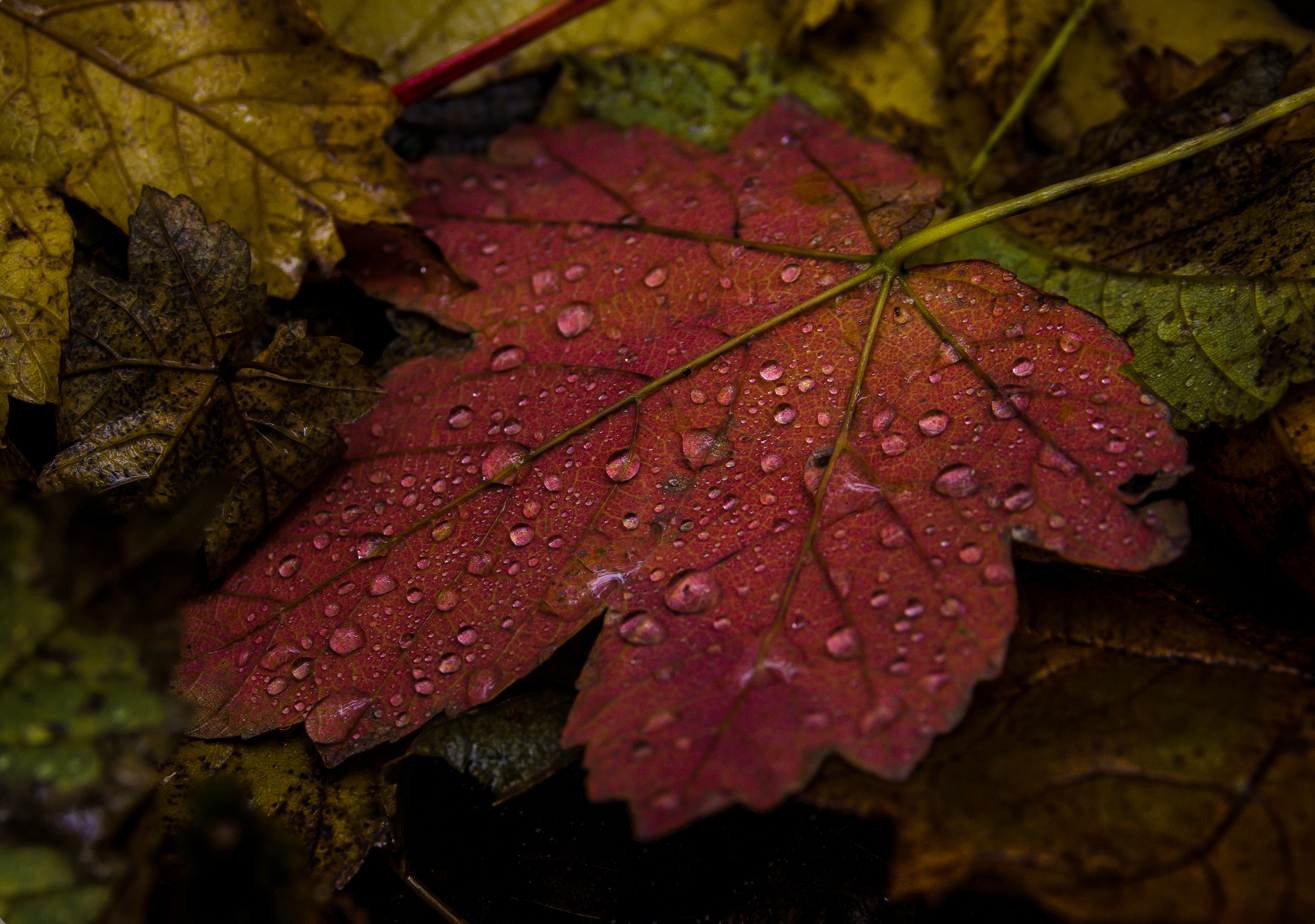
Autumn on the forest floor, Mount Macedon

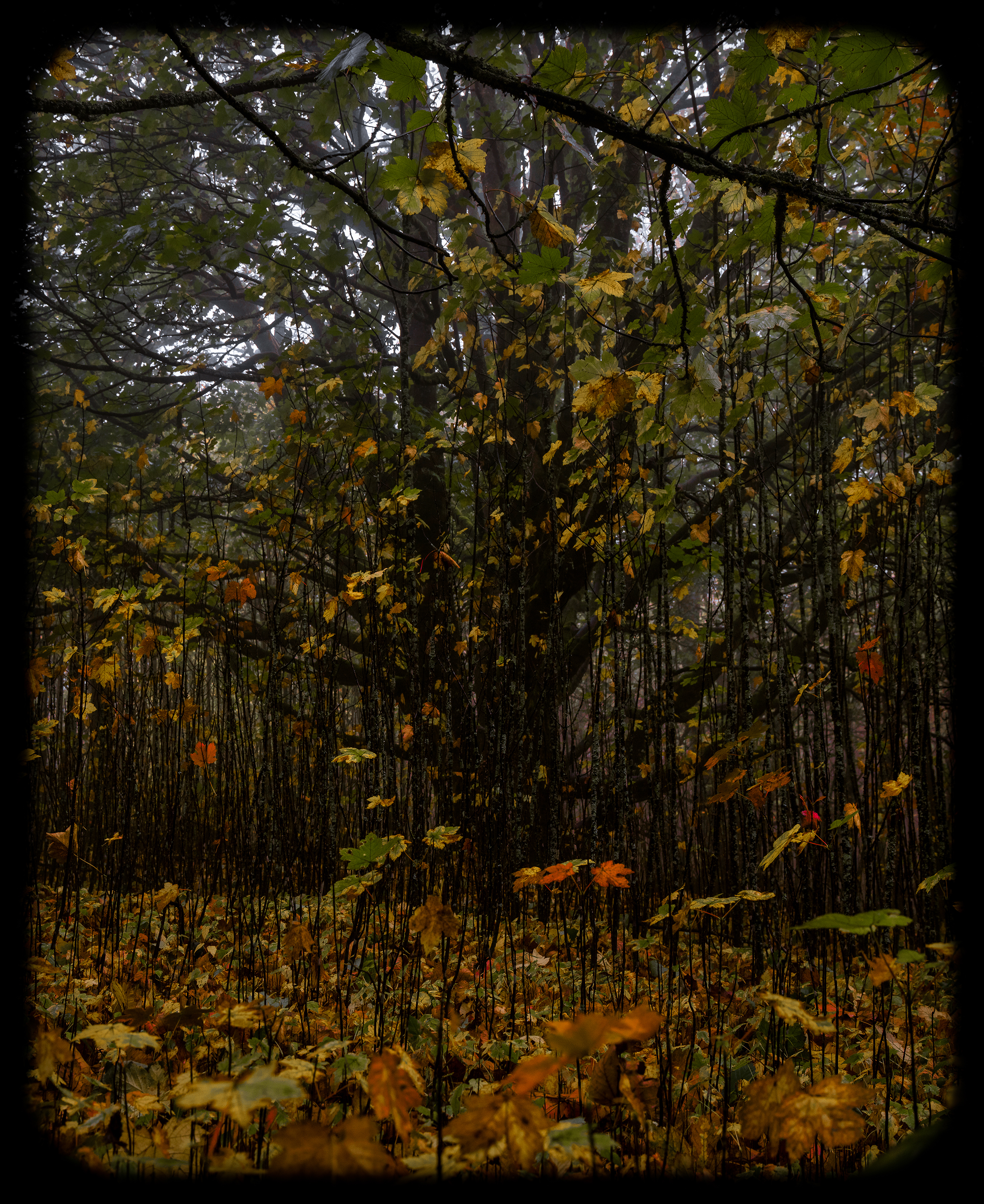
Late autumn at the Fairy Tree, Mount Macedon

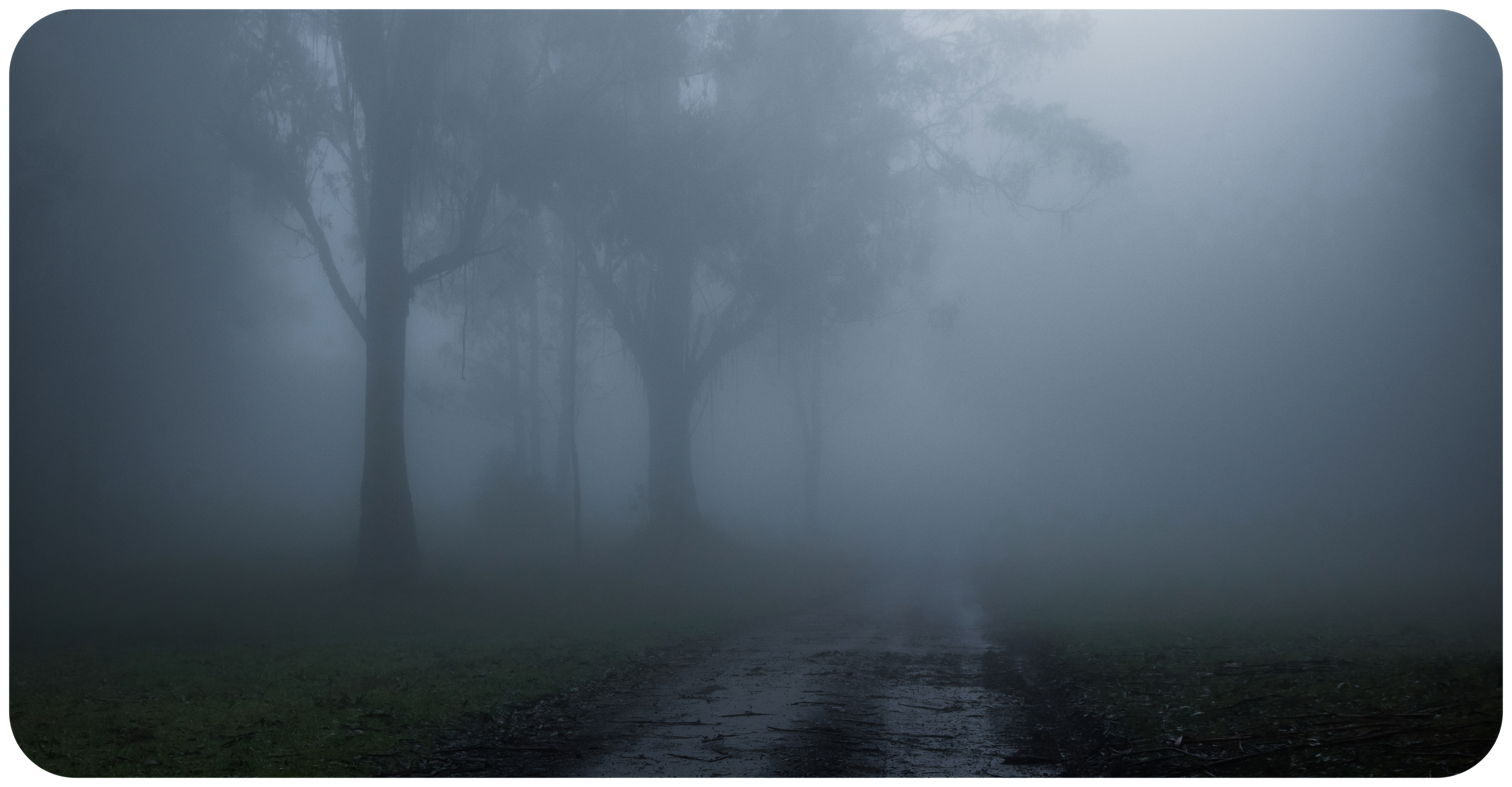
Mists of Macedon, Mount Macedon

- The garden Alton – across Alton Road from Hascombe, is one of the locations for the setting of the 2006 Australian film adaptation of Macbeth, mainly due to its historic residence surrounded by an English garden. The 11-hectare (26-acre) hill station property includes a 4.0 hectares (10 acres) botanical garden, a large Venetian-Gothic house built in the 1870s and a small farm, all of which is being carefully restored by the owners, the Eshuys family.
- Ard Choille – the garden was designed by notable landscape designer William Sangster in 1896.
- Ard Rudah – the heritage listed 140-year-old garden is one of 25 gardens at Mount Macedon recognised by the National Trust for its historic significance.
- Bolobek House & Garden 370 Mount Macedon Road, Macedon – heritage-listed location is one of the most outstanding gardens in Australia, and participates in the Open Gardens scheme. It was developed by Joan Law-Smith, and visited by royalty and many overseas dignitaries. Joan Law-Smith described her garden design for Bolobek in the book The Garden Within and authored many other garden design books.
- Camelot, 847 Mount Macedon Rd.), Mount Macedon – Formerly Hohe Warte, built by The Austro-Hungarian Consul Carl Pinschof and his wife Elise in 1886. Elements of the original garden remain including the pine trees which surround the house. Renowned Australian Impressionist painters Arthur Streeton, Frederick McCubbin and Tom Roberts were frequently hosted by the Pinschofs and the surrounds were the subject of many notable paintings. The current house was built in 1940.
- Cameron Lodge Garden, 767 Mount Macedon Road, Mount Macedon.

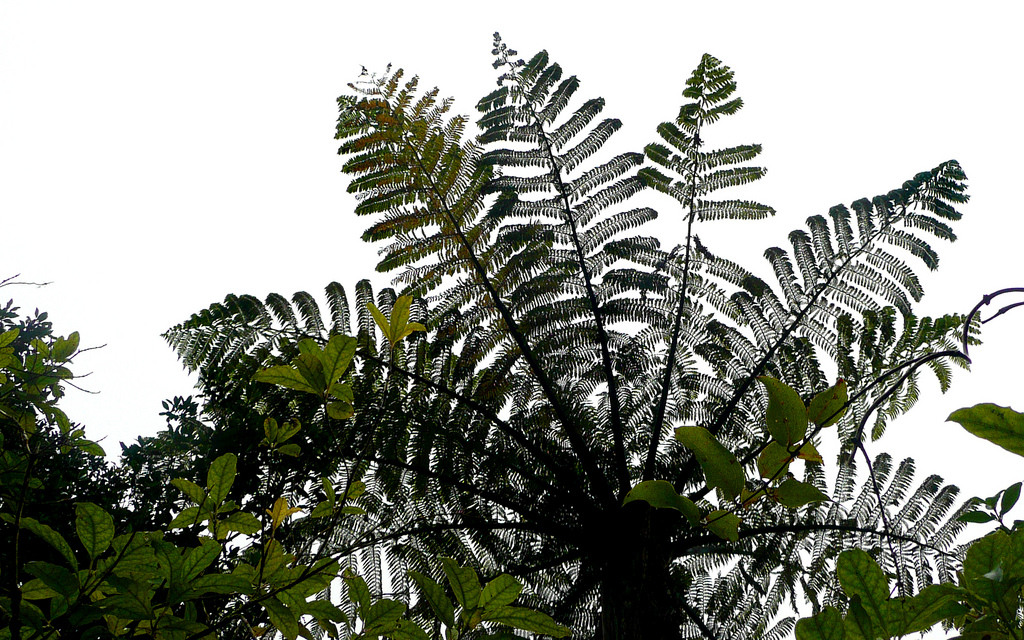
Cyathea dealbata

- Dreamthorpe Garden, 445 Mount Macedon Rd (cnr Turritable Rd), Mount Macedon – the current owners, Jan and Peter Clark, say the influence of two major English garden designers, William Robinson and Gertrude Jekyll, is clearly evident.
- Duneira Estate, Officer Lane, Mount Macedon – heritage-listed location. Duneira is regularly open to the public and is run by a private foundation.
- Forest Glade Gardens dates back 100 years, and is open every day in season.
- Glen Rannoch Garden 84 Devonshire Lane, Mount Macedon – listed on the Victorian Heritage Register and visited by the ABC TV Gardening Australia television program.
- Gresford, 27 Taylors Road, Mount Macedon.
- Hascombe is a large garden owned by Linfox. It has an annual open day where all money received goes to charity. It only has two gardeners working for the whole 28-acre (11 ha) property. It has one of only two Himalayan Fir (Abies pindrow) trees in Australia, the other being located in Adelaide. It is the highest private property on Mount Macedon by altitude.
- Huntly Burn 707 Mount Macedon Road Mount Macedon Macedon Ranges Shire – also listed on the Victorian Heritage Register and is recognised by the National Trust as one of the top historic gardens in Victoria.
- Karori, 106 Devonshire Lane Mount Macedon – dates from 1888 and was the summer retreat of Charles William Chapman.
- Lewisham, a modern garden at 305 Mount Macedon Road, Mount Macedon.
- Marnanie, 53 Devonshire Lane Mount Macedon – was home to the first Australian-born Governor General, Sir Issac Issacs
- Penola, 222 Alton Road, Mount Macedon – a garden estate of 4.5 hectares (11 acres), established by the sister of William Guilfoyle, creator of the Melbourne Botanic Gardens.
- Sefton, 864 Mount Macedon Road, Mount Macedon – built by the Baillieu family. The eight-hectare (20-acre) English garden was laid out by Melbourne Royal Botanic Gardens directors Baron von Mueller and William Guilfoyle. The Federation Arts and Crafts mansion was designed by the architects Sydney Smith and Ogg.
- Shepherd's Bush, 982 Mount Macedon Road, Mount Macedon, a 140-year-old, 1.2-hectare (3.0-acre) garden known for its spring and autumn display. Full of rare European and North American plants. Situated at 865 metres (2,838 ft) above sea level (highest main residence on Mount Macedon)
- Tieve Tara, 751 Mount Macedon Road, Mount Macedon.

== Film industry ==
Mount Macedon has been used as a filming location by some US film production companies, due to lower costs associated with filming outside the US, and the architecture and horticulture of the area closely resembling places in the Northern Hemisphere with an abundance of deciduous trees.

The 2009 Nicolas Cage film Knowing was filmed in locations in the township, along with nearby Macedon, and Don't Be Afraid of the Dark was also filmed in the town over the 2009 winter. Scenes in Where the Wild Things Are were filmed in the forest surrounding Mount Macedon.

Parts of the Liam Neeson film Blacklight (film) (2022) were filmed in Macedon township, notably the trailer park scene.

== Sport ==
Golfers play at the course of the Mount Macedon Golf Club on Mount Macedon Road.

An annual tennis tournament was held in January in Mount Macedon for a period in the 1930s.

Fox hunting in the surrounding forest was popular in the early nineteenth century, although native animals were frequently encountered and killed.
