= List of radio stations in Wellington =

This is a list of radio stations in the Wellington Region of New Zealand.

Note: Several FM stations changed their frequency during October 2010, as broadcast licences were renewed and spacing standardised to 0.8 MHz. AM stations were also moved in 1978 when New Zealand switched from 10 kHz frequency spacing to 9 kHz spacing.

== Wellington metro radio stations ==
=== FM stations ===
Nearly all full-power FM stations in Wellington broadcast from the Mount Kaukau transmitter. As a general rule, frequencies in Wellington are spaced 0.8 MHz apart, starting from 89.3 MHz.

Some Hutt Valley "infill" frequencies with transmitters at Towai or Fitzherbert have been allocated to the 0.4 MHz "gap" in between other stations.

Frequency (MHz)	Name	Format	Licensed Transmitter	Licensed power (kW)	Broadcasting on frequency since	Previous station(s) on frequency
88.6	Radio Active	Alternative rock	Tinakori Hill	1	1981 on 89 MHz	
89.3	Newstalk ZB	Talk radio	Kaukau	40		
90.1	The Hits	Adult contemporary music	Kaukau; Haywards; Towai	40; 0.8; 0.8	1993	Broadcast on 89.8 MHz from 1990 to 1995 and 90.0 MHz prior to 2010; 1990–1991 2ZB 1991–1993 B90 FM (same station but rebranded); 1993–2014 Classic Hits 90FM (same station but rebranded)
90.9	ZM (originally ZMFM)	Contemporary hit radio	Kaukau; Towai	80; 0.8	1985	
91.7	The Edge	Contemporary hit radio	Kaukau; Haywards	80; 0.8	2007	1990s–1991 Fox FM renamed from Greater Wellington FM; 1993–1995 The Heat 91.7FM; 1995–1997 The Box 91.7FM; 1997–1998 92 Hitz FM; 1998 99–100 More FM (temporary simulcast); 1998–2005 Channel Z 2005–2006 Kiwi FM; 2006–2007 More FM Wellington (temporary simulcast)
92.5	RNZ Concert	Classical music	Kaukau	80		
93.3	Radio Hauraki	Classic rock	Kaukau	40	2010	Broadcast on 93.1 MHz prior to 2010
93.7	Flava	Urban contemporary	Towai	0.8	9 May 2025	Broadcast on 93.5 MHz prior to 2010; 1986 – 2007 91ZM; 2008–2012 Easy Mix; 2012–2016: Radio Sport; 2016 – 30 June 2020: Mix; 1 July 2020 – 8 May 2025: Gold
94.1	The Breeze	Easy listening	Kaukau	40	1993	1991–1993 Radio Windy/Windy FM
94.9	Atiawa Toa FM		Kaukau	16	1990s	also 100.9 MHz
95.3	More FM	Adult contemporary music	Fitzherbert	1	2004	Station broadcast on 94.7 MHz prior to 2010; 1996–2004 Channel Z
95.7	Coast	Easy listening	Kaukau	40	2011	
96.1	RNZ Concert	Classical music	Towai	0.8		Station broadcast on 95.6 MHz prior to 2010
96.5	The Rock	Active rock	Kaukau; Haywards	16; 0.8	1999	Station broadcast on 96.3 MHz prior to 2010; 1993–1998 Pirate FM
97.3	The Sound	Classic rock	Kaukau; Haywards	16; 0.8	2012	Stations broadcast on 97.5 MHz prior to 2010; 1992 2XX Kapiti; 1992–1993 Cadbury Moro FM; 1994–1995 The Heat 91.7FM (temporary simulcast); 1995–1997 The Quake 97.5FM; 1997–1999 Solid Gold; 2000–2008 The Edge; 2008–2011 Solid Gold
98.1	Life FM	Contemporary Christian music	Kaukau	25	2010	Station broadcast on 98.5 MHz prior to 2010; 1995–1996 Kix FM; 1996–2004 Channel Z
98.5	The Breeze	Easy listening	Fitzherbert	0.63	1993	Station broadcast on 98.1 MHz prior to 2010 and relocated to Fitzherbert in 2020; 1991–1993 Radio Windy/Windy FM
98.9	Breeze Classic	1970s	Kaukau; Haywards	16; 0.8	1 November 2025	Station broadcast on 98.9 MHz from 1991 to 2004 and 98.7 MHz from 2005 to 2010; 1991–2004 More FM; 2005–2019: Radio Live; 19 January 2019 – 20 March 2022: Magic Talk; 21 March 2022 – 30 March 2023: Today FM; 14 April 2023 – 31 October 2025: Magic
99.7	More FM	Adult contemporary music	Kaukau; Haywards	40; 0.8	1991	Station broadcast on 100.0 MHz prior to 2010; 1990–1991 Windy FM
100.5	Mai FM	Urban contemporary	Kaukau	16	2012	
100.9	Atiawa Toa FM		Fitzherbert	0.8	2010	
101.3	RNZ National		Kaukau	8		
101.7	RNZ National		Towai	0.8		Broadcast on 104.5 MHz prior to 2010
103.7	PMN 531		Kaukau	8	Jan 2019	2010–2019 Niu FM
104.1	PMN 531		Fitzherbert	0.8	Jan 2019	2010–2019 Niu FM
104.5	Channel X	Classic alternative	Kaukau	8	8 May 2023	Stations broadcast on 99.4 MHz prior to 2010; 2005 – 2011 Coast; 2011–2013 Radio Sport; 2013 – 2015 Flava – 2019 George FM (on 106.7 MHz LPFM); Sept 2019 – 23 April 2023: Magic on 98.9 MHz
105.3	Radio Tarana		Kaukau	2	11 October 2022	2009–2010 Hit Radio X105; 2011 – April 2022: Wellington 105.3FM
106.1	Wellington Access Radio	Access radio	Kaukau	2.5	2017	2010–2016 Hutt Radio (previously 106.7 MHz LPFM, now 88.3 MHz LPFM)

=== AM stations ===
Frequency (kHz)	Name	Format	Transmitter	Licensed kW	Broadcasting on frequency since	Previous station(s) on frequency
567	RNZ National	Public radio	Titahi Bay	160	1978	previously 2YA also broadcast on 720 and 570 kHz from 1927 to 1978
657	AM Network (Parliament) and Sanctuary	Parliament Public radio and Christian radio	Titahi Bay	160	2000	1978–1986 Concert Radio, 2YC (that also broadcast on 840 kHz and 660 kHz prior to 1978); Until 14 February 2025: Star rebranded
972	Radio Rhema	Christian radio	Horokiwi	12.5	1992	
1035	Newstalk ZB	Talk radio	Titahi Bay	63	1993	1978–1993 2ZB (previously broadcasting on 980 kHz between 1937 and 1978)
1161	Te Upoko O Te Ika	Māori radio	Titahi Bay	32	1986	1978–1986 2ZM (previously broadcasting on 1160 kHz between 1969 and 1978 and using callsign 2YD between 1937 and 1969)
1233	Sport Nation	Sports radio	Horokiwi	12.5	Jan 2025	1990–1994 BBC World Service; 1995–1996 Radio Liberty; 1996–1997 BBC World Service; 1997–1999 Southern Star; 1999–2008 Solid Gold; 2008–2019 Radio Live; 19 January 2019 – 20 March 2022: Magic Talk; 21 March 2022 – 30 March 2023: Today FM; 31 March 2023 – Jan 2025 The Breeze
1449	Independent broadcaster	Relaying George FM's Auckland program	Naenae	0.025	14 February 2026	new licence activated. C-QUAM AM Stereo.
1503	iHeartCountry	Country music	Horokiwi	16	4 May 2026	1982–1992 Radio Rhema; 1997–1998 Sports Round Up; 1998 – 30 March 2020 Radio Sport; 30/03 – 30 June 2020: Newstalk ZB; 1/07/2020-04/05/2026: Gold Sport

=== Internet Radio Stations ===
The rise in internet radio stations has been prevalent in Wellington. Mouthfull Radio is the contemporary station that showcases community online radio from Wellington. Most stations also use an m3u stream on their website so you can listen online if you are outside of the band of radio in proximity.

=== Decommissioned frequencies ===
The following frequencies were previously used in the Wellington region, but most were decommissioned in the reallocation of frequencies in October 2010.

It is unlikely that most of the FM frequencies will be re-used as they do not fit within the current band spacing plan. Possible exceptions are 102.1/102.9 MHz and 96.9 MHz that fit the band plans for Wellington and Hutt Valley respectively.

=== FM frequencies ===
Frequency (MHz)	Status	Previous stations on frequency	Area served	Replacement frequency (if applicable)
89.0	Decommissioned	1982–2011 Radio Active	Wellington	88.6 MHz (Radio Active)
89.4	Decommissioned	?–2010 Radio Sport	Upper Hutt / Hutt Valley	93.7 MHz (Radio Sport – Hutt Valley transmitter)
90.0	Decommissioned	1990–1991 2ZB; 1991–1993 B90 FM (same station rebranded); 1993–2010 Classic Hits 90FM	Greater Wellington	90.1 Classic Hits 90FM
93.1	Decommissioned	2004–2010 Radio Hauraki	Greater Wellington	93.3 MHz (Hauraki)
93.5	Decommissioned	1986–2007 ZMFM/91ZM; 2007–2010 Easy Mix	Hutt Valley	Easy Mix moved to 93.7 MHz & closed June 2012, replaced by Radio Sport
94.7	Decommissioned	1995–1996 Kix FM; 1996–2004 Channel Z 2004–2010 More FM Wellington	Hutt Valley	95.3 MHz (More FM – Hutt Valley)
95.6	Decommissioned	1980s–2010 Radio New Zealand Concert	Hutt Valley	96.1 MHz (RNZ Concert – Hutt Valley)
96.3	Decommissioned	1990s Pirate FM; 1999–2010 The Rock	Greater Wellington	96.5 MHz (The Rock)
96.9	Decommissioned	1990s–2010 Atiawa Toa FM	Wellington & Hutt Valley (excluding Porirua)	100.9 MHz Atiawa Toa FM
98.7	Decommissioned	2004–2005 More FM (moved from 98.9 MHz); 2005–2010 Radio Live	Greater Wellington	98.9 MHz (Radio Live)
99.2	Decommissioned	2006–2010 Life FM	Porirua	98.1 MHz (Life FM – Porirua)
99.4	Decommissioned	2005–2010 Coast	Greater Wellington	95.7 MHz (Coast)
100.0	Decommissioned	1991–2010 More FM Wellington	Wellington / Porirua	99.7 MHz (More FM)
100.7	Decommissioned	2002–2010 Niu FM	Hutt Valley	104.1 MHz (Niu FM – Hutt Valley)
102.1	Decommissioned 2015; Crown Reserve	2006 – 2015: Kiwi FM	Greater Wellington	
102.9	Expired Licence 265411; Crown Reserve Maori	20-24/02/2019: Haka Translate Te Matatini ki te Ao (Event Broadcast)	Westpac Stadium/Wellington CBD	

=== AM frequencies ===
Frequency (kHz)	Status	Previous stations on frequency	Area served	Replacement frequency (if applicable)
711	Decommissioned 2025	1992–2005: Radio Pacific; 2005–2007: Radio Pacific and Radio Trackside; 2007–2010: BSport and Radio Trackside; 2010–2015: LiveSPORT and Radio Trackside; 2015–2020: TAB Trackside; 2021–2024: SENZ; Nov 2024 – Jan 2025: Sport Nation	Greater Wellington	1233 kHz Sport Nation
783	Decommissioned 2017	1981–2017: Wellington Access Radio (original call sign 2YB); Samoan Capital Radio	Greater Wellington	106.1 MHz FM Wellington Access Radio
891	Decommissioned 2024	1978–1993 Radio Windy broadcasting on 1080 kHz between 1973 and 1976 and 890 kHz between 1976 and 1978; 1993 – 2015 The Breeze; 2015–2024: Magic	Greater Wellington	98.9 MHz FM Magic
1323	Decommissioned	1988–1994: Aotearoa Radio	Greater Wellington	

=== Low power FM frequencies ===
There are a number of Low Power FM stations that are operating, or have operated, in Wellington whose broadcast range may be less than that of the full-power FM stations. NOTE: This list is hopelessly out of date and while some stations may still be on air, their frequency may have changed. Many other stations listed here are no longer broadcasting – such is the transient nature of low power FM.

==== Wellington ====
- AREC FM, 107.0, mono, BBC World Service. Good coverage of CBD right out to the airport and the station is commercial free.
- Calvary Chapel Radio, 106.9 MHz stereo, near Newtown, Christian Radio
- Critical Analysis Broadcasting 107.1 FM, broadcasting to Kilbirnie, Melrose and Miramar, was on 107.5 MHz til 8 March Talks of left-green persuasion
- Family Radio – Karori, 106.9 FM, Stereo, Bible-centred and God-glorifying broadcast. Bible readings, music, studies, and talkback discussion
- Fleet FM, 107.3 MHz Wellington from July 2003 until May 2010
- George FM, 106.7 MHz, (replaced Rova 1067 September 2019). Appears to be transmitting from on or around Victoria University in Kelburn
- Groove FM, 106.8 MHz, mono, located at Trades Hall, used for uplink to 107.7 MHz transmitter 41°17′42.61″S 174°46′35.25″E
- Groove FM, 107.7 MHz, mono, some adverts, broadcasting from the CBD area
- High-Fi FM, 107.3 MHz, Wellington High School radio station
- Human FM, 88.1 MHz stereo, eclectic music, poetry, Christian, broadcasting from Victoria University Anglican Chaplaincy (started May 2007)
- Kix FM 87.6 MHz stereo, CBD, Capital Rock
- Kool FM, 107.3 MHz stereo, adverts, NZ Radio School, Cuba Street
- Maranui FM, 106.7 MHz Lyall Bay School since 2008
- Matrix 107.5 FM mono, music and educational material
- Mix FM 87.9 MHz stereo, Grenada Village, Churton Park, Johnsonville, northern suburbs, Pop/rock music ranging from the 80s to today.
- MUNTfm, 88.5 MHz (not on this frequency now as it is no longer available for LPFM) stereo, broadcasting from old Museum, now Massey University, music mix incl. NZ music (monitored to have played Half a Bat Cat) 41°17′59.54″S 174°46′37.13″E
- Muse Radio, 87.9 MHz, Student radio Wellington Central
- only around Oriental Bay, 107.3 MHz, jazz, low power
- Radio Brooklyn, 106.9 MHz mono, 0.5 Watts but superior location, opened 12. Feb 2008, plays copyright free speeches and university lectures, at 7 pm relays Radio Netherlands Newsdesk and Democracy Now.
- Radio Island Bay 107.5 FM mono, broadcasting from Island Bay
- Radio Karori, 107.5 MHz mono, political talks
- Radio Melina 107.4 FM, stereo 1W output, broadcasting from Seatoun, 41°19′29.36″S 174°50′14.17″E.
- Radio Rainbow, 107.6 MHz
- Rova 1067, 106.7 MHz down town Wellington "The Rova All Day Breakfast with Polly & Grant" live and then replayed, started July 2017 (Stuff), George FM reinstated September 2019
- Up FM, 88.1 MHz Wellington, dance music launched October 2006
- Te Upoko O Te Ika, 87.6FM (simulcast of 1161AM) Maori radio Wellington CBD
- The Sound FM, 88.7 MHz? (not a LPFM frequency), Plays all your hit music and your favourite jams from the 70s to today with shows that cater for everyone.
- The Wedge 88.1 FM, Newtown, weekday evenings
- TLC Radio, 88.0 MHz, country music broadcasting for Wellington CBD, Mt Vic & inner hill suburbs

==== Upper Hutt, Lower Hutt and Petone ====
- 107.2 Secret FM, 107.2 MHz Lower Hutt Central, Youth radio established 2012
- 107.7 FM HIBS Student Radio, Hutt International Boys' School, Trentham, Upper Hutt
- andHow.FM 107.5 MHz, Stereo, Mangaroa Valley, Indie Rock
- Boom FM, 88.7 MHz, Electronica interspersed with classics and kiwi sounds
- Calvary Chapel Radio, 106.9 MHz, Christian Radio
- Core FM, 107.1 MHz, Alicetown
- Hutt City FM, 106.7 MHz, Lower Hutt
- Hutt Radio, 88.3 MHz (previously 106.1 and 106.7 MHz), Lower Hutt
- KIX-FM was a fully commercial rock radio station with studios in central Lower Hutt, Wellington, New Zealand. First going to air in 1993, it filled a gap in Wellington for a rock station when the former Radio Windy reformatted to an easy listening format as The Breeze in 1993. All the on-air staff on KIX FM were volunteers and new to radio. After the station went off-air in 1996 many of the original staff went on to work at some of the New Zealand's biggest radio stations including Mike Currie (Thrasher) on Radio Hauraki & The Sound, Spiros Foundoulakis went to More FM Wellington, Kris Miller worked for The Breeze in Wellington and David Cunningham (deceased) moved to Port FM in Timaru. After going off-air it was resurrected in 2001 as a low power FM radio station and is completely commercial free. Originally on 106.7 MHz, then 88.7 MHz and 87.6 MHz 2010 – 2017, the station streams on the internet and is completely automated.
- Robot FM, 107.5 MHz mono, Lower Hutt, broadcasting political talks (started May 2006)
- Supernova, 107.0 MHz, mellower music mix + NZ
- The Cheese FM, 87.7 MHz, Stereo, Stokes Valley. Broadcasting to Stokes Valley. Hits of the 80's 90s and Today.
- The Hutt Valleys River FM 88.0 MHz Upper Hutt. The station has been broadcasting since Feb 2009. We are a community station broadcasting live morning shows Mon-Fri with community & up to date commuter information as well as a wide range of music. Totally local the Hutts Best Music River FM and also streaming on www.riverfm.co.nz "click" the listen now button

==== Porirua ====
- AREC FM, 87.6 MHz, mono, Porirua, BBC World Service, simulcast on 87.9 MHz Kapiti (see table below), and Wellington 107.0 MHz, in the CBD. Good coverage on SH1 from Johnsonville to Pukerua Bay Bay and the station is commercial free.
- Genesis FM, 88.1 MHz, mono, Porirua, Bible preaching
- S-FM, 88.3 MHz, stereo, Broadcasting from Pak'nSave, Porirua, Top 40, Urban, no broadcasts 13th,17 March 2018
- Tawa College FM, tba, Tawa only, plays rock songs apart from 1:20 – 2:15 on weekdays when there is a talk show
- World FM, 88.2, stereo, Tawa, World Music plus relays of WRN & Radio Six International

=== Digital Audio Broadcasting (DAB) trial in Wellington ===
Kordia operated a (DAB) test service between October 2006 and 30 June 2018. At the conclusion the trial transmissions were from Mt Kaukau in Band III on 192.352 MHz. The multiplex delivered a mix of DAB and DAB+ programmes over nearly 12 years. The programmes at the conclusion of the trial were:

Programme	Format	DAB/+	Bit rate kb/s
KDAB	Pop music	DAB+	96 stereo
Base FM	Freeform Urban contemporary	DAB	128 stereo
BBC World Service	Talk radio	DAB	64 mono
Brian FM	Adult Hits	DAB+	96 stereo
RNZ Concert+	Classical music	DAB+	112 stereo
George FM	House music	DAB	128/stereo
NBR Radio	Talk radio Finance	DAB+	32 mono
RNZ National	Public radio	DAB	128 j/stereo
Rhema+	Christian radio	DAB+	96 stereo
Spice+	Punjabi radio	DAB+	96 stereo
Radio Tarana	Contemporary Indian radio	DAB	128 stereo
The Flea FM	Pop music	DAB+	96 stereo

== Kāpiti Coast/Horowhenua radio stations ==
=== FM Stations ===
Frequency (MHz)	Name	Format	Transmitter location	Licensed kW	Broadcasting on frequency since	Previous stations on frequency
88.7	Vacant January 2021		Forest Heights	0.63		Reo FM
89.5	Newstalk ZB	Talk radio	Forest Heights	0.63		
90.3	More FM	Adult contemporary music	Forest Heights	2.5		Was 90.2 Kapiti / 95.1 & 104.2 Horowhenua; Previous names 2XX & 95FM
91.1	ZM	Contemporary hit radio	Forest Heights	0.63	2004	
91.9	The Rock	Active rock	Forest Heights	0.63		
92.7	The Hits	Adult contemporary	Forest Heights	0.63	2004	Radio Sport until 2004, Classic Hits 92.7 until 2014 Same station but rebranded
93.5	Sport Nation	Sports radio	Forest Heights	0.63	19 November 2024	TAB Trackside, SENZ
94.3	The Sound	Classic rock	Forest Heights	1	2012	Solid Gold FM, The Heat, The Box
95.1	Breeze Classic	1970s	Forest Heights	0.5	1 November 2025	95.1 More FM Horowhenua (95.1 Relocated from Heights Road Shannon) More FM now 90.3 Kapiti & Horowhenua; 2015-31/10/2025: Magic
95.9	Coast	Easy listening	Forest Heights	0.63		
96.7	Life FM	Contemporary Christian music	Forest Heights	0.63		Coast Access Radio
97.5	The Edge	Contemporary hit radio	Forest Heights	0.63		
98.3	RNZ Concert	Classical music	Forest Heights	0.5		
99.1	Channel X	Classic alternative	Forest Heights	0.63	8 May 2023	2005–2019: Radio Live; 19 January 2019 – 20 March 2022: Magic Talk; 21 March 2022 – 30 March 2023: Today FM
100.7	The Breeze	Easy listening	Forest Heights	0.63		
101.5	RNZ National	Public radio	Forest Heights	0.5		
103.9	Radio Rhema	Christian radio	Forest Heights	0.5		
104.7	Coast Access	Access radio	Forest Heights	0.63		
106.3	Beach FM	Local commercial radio	Forest Heights	0.63		

=== LPFM stations ===
Frequency (MHz)	Name	Format	Transmitter location	Licensed kW	Broadcasting on frequency since	Previous stations on frequency
87.9	AREC FM	BBC World Service	Waikanae Low Power FM	0.001	2018	Was 87.6 MHz Waikanae Live
88.2	Paekākāriki 88.2	Local issues and artists	Paekākāriki Low Power FM	0.001		
107.5	silent 1 April 2021		Paraparaumu Low Power FM	0.001		2016–? Triple X FM

=== AM stations ===
Frequency (kHz)	Name	Format	Transmitter location	Licensed kW	Broadcasting on frequency since	Previous stations on frequency
1377	Ceased 15 February 2020		Te Horo	8		Until 2004 – 2XX; 2004–2020 Radio Sport

- Radio Kapiti, (frequency not recorded) holiday broadcaster

== Wairarapa radio stations ==
=== FM stations ===
Frequency (MHz)	Name	Format	Location	Licensed kW	Years	Previous station(s) on frequency
88.7	Life FM	Christian radio	Masterton (Pariwhariki Trig)	0.32		
89.5	More FM	Adult contemporary music	Wairarapa Valley (Popoiti)	4		Hitz 89FM (later known as Hitz 89.3FM), Today FM (not the Mediaworks brand)
90.3	The Hits	Adult contemporary music	Masterton (Otahoua)	4		Classic Hits Wairarapa, Radio Wairarapa, 2ZD
91.1	Sport Nation	Sports radio	Masterton (Otahoua)	4	19 November 2024	SENZ, TAB Trackside, Live Sport, BSport, Radio Pacific-Trackside
91.9	Coast	Easy listening	Masterton (Otahoua)	4	Oct 2019	Radio Sport
92.7	Arrow FM	Access Radio	Wairarapa Valley (Popoiti)	0.8		
93.5	The Sound	Classic rock	Wairarapa Valley (Popoiti)	4		Solid Gold FM
94.3	ZM	Contemporary hit radio	Masterton (Otahoua)	4		
95.1	The Rock	Active rock	Wairarapa Valley (Popoiti)	4		
95.9	The Edge	Contemporary hit radio	Wairarapa Valley (Popoiti)	4		
97.5	Rhema	Christian radio	Masterton (Pariwhariki Trig)	0.32		
98.3	Channel X	Classic alternative	Wairarapa Valley (Popoiti)	4	8 May 2023	Radio Pacific; Radio Live; 2019 – 20 March 2022: Magic Talk; 21 March 2022 – 30 March 2023: Today FM
99.1	RNZ Concert	Classical music	Masterton (Otahoua)	4		
99.9	The Breeze	Easy listening	Wairarapa Valley (Popoiti)	4		
100.7	Sanctuary	Christian radio	Masterton (Pariwhariki Trig)	0.32	14 February 2025	Until 14 February 2025: Star rebranded
101.5	RNZ National	Public radio	Masterton (Otahoua)	4		
103.9	Newstalk ZB	Talk radio	Masterton (Popoiti)	4	Aug 2024	
104.7	Brian FM	Adult contemporary/Classic rock	Masterton (Popoiti)	4	2025	
105.5	Breeze Classic	1970s	Wairarapa Valley (Popoiti)	4	1 November 2025	until 31 October 2025: Magic
105.9	More FM	Adult contemporary music	Castlepoint	0.32		

=== Low Power FM stations ===
Frequency (MHz)	Name	Format	Location	Licensed kW	Years	Previous station(s) on frequency
87.6	Ceased		Masterton	0.001		Oct 2019 – Mar 2020: Radio Sport; 30/03 – 30 June 2020: Newstalk ZB; 1/07/2020-04/05/2026: Gold Sport
87.8			Masterton	0.001		3ABN
88.1	Hit Student Radio	Top 40, Old school	Makoura College Masterton	0.001		

=== AM stations ===
Frequency (kHz)	Name	Format	Location	Licensed kW	Years	Previous station(s) on frequency
846	Ceased January 2025		Masterton (Waingawa)	6.3		Community Radio Wairarapa, 2ZD (2ZD previously broadcast on 1180, 1170 and 840 kHz between 1931 and 1978); Newstalk ZB ceased 29 January 2025
1071	Ceased 1 February 2025		Masterton (Waingawa)	8		~1965 – 1 February 2025: RNZ National
