= New Zealand masts =

New Zealand Masts and Towers range in size from short flagpoles to high radio transmitter antenna structures. The highest mast is in Titahi Bay, being the highest structure in the Southern Hemisphere at time of construction. Later it became the highest in New Zealand and then later second to the Sky Tower in Auckland.

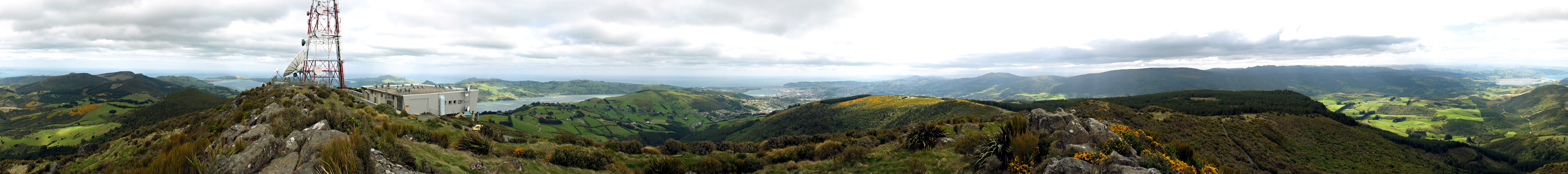
Panoramic view from Mount Cargill, Dunedin. The base of the Mount Cargill television transmitter can be seen on the left

== Height ==
- Skytower is 328 metres (1,076 ft) tall, as measured from ground level to the top of the mast, making it the tallest free-standing structure in the Southern Hemisphere.
- The radio mast of the Titahi Bay Transmitter was New Zealand's second tallest structure. The tower was 212 metres (696 ft) tall, and owned by Radio New Zealand. The antenna was a 'guyed support' type, broadcasting at the low end of the medium wave AM radio broadcast band, 567 kHz, with 50 kilowatts of power. The AM radio transmitting antenna was a high structure, due to the height being a function of wavelength (station frequency). This tower was demolished in early 2016, due to rising maintenance costs, and AM services were transferred to neighbouring towers in Titahi Bay.
- 120-metre (390 ft) television masts were built in many strategic locations (such as Waiatarua and Christchurch) in the late 1950s / early 1960s. They were self-supporting steel structures, staffed with then NZBC New Zealand Broadcasting Corporation personnel, and occasionally carrying NZPO New Zealand Post Office VHF and marine radio services. The primary purpose was 100 kW (ERP) VHF television.
- Varying height, 10–30 metres (33–98 ft), a backbone of microwave steel self-supporting structures for microwave links were also built by the New Zealand Post Office (now owned by Telecom New Zealand) from the mid-1950s on. A network of 4 GHz STC vacuum tube based stations were built between Hamilton at the northern end and Palmerston North at the southern end. The path was via New Plymouth. Several networks of 6 GHz Lenkurt solid state based stations were built between Whangārei and Auckland via Waiatarua and later a spur to Warkworth satellite station. Hamilton to Palmerston North via Rotorua, Taupō, Napier, with a spur to Tauranga from Kaimai station. A southern network of Wellington to Dunedin via Cook Strait was also built.
- 30-metre (98 ft) free standing wooden or steel masts are used for the other VHF and UHF commercial and infrastructure radio services.

== Locations ==
- Mount Cargill
- Mount Kaukau
- Titahi Bay

== History ==
One of the antenna masts at Titahi Bay currently carries the Radio New Zealand National programme, previously having a call-sign of 2YA.

== Gallery ==
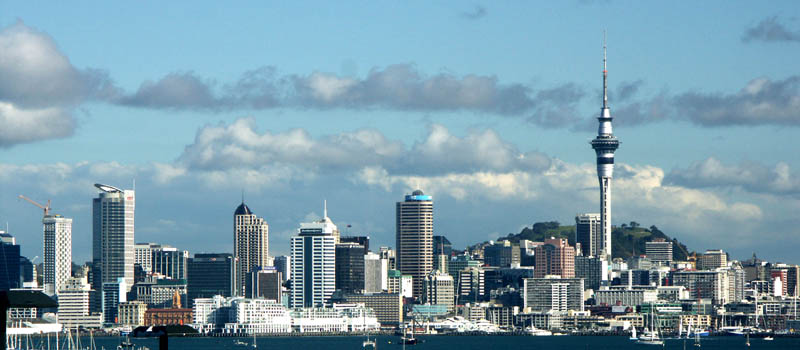
Sky Tower

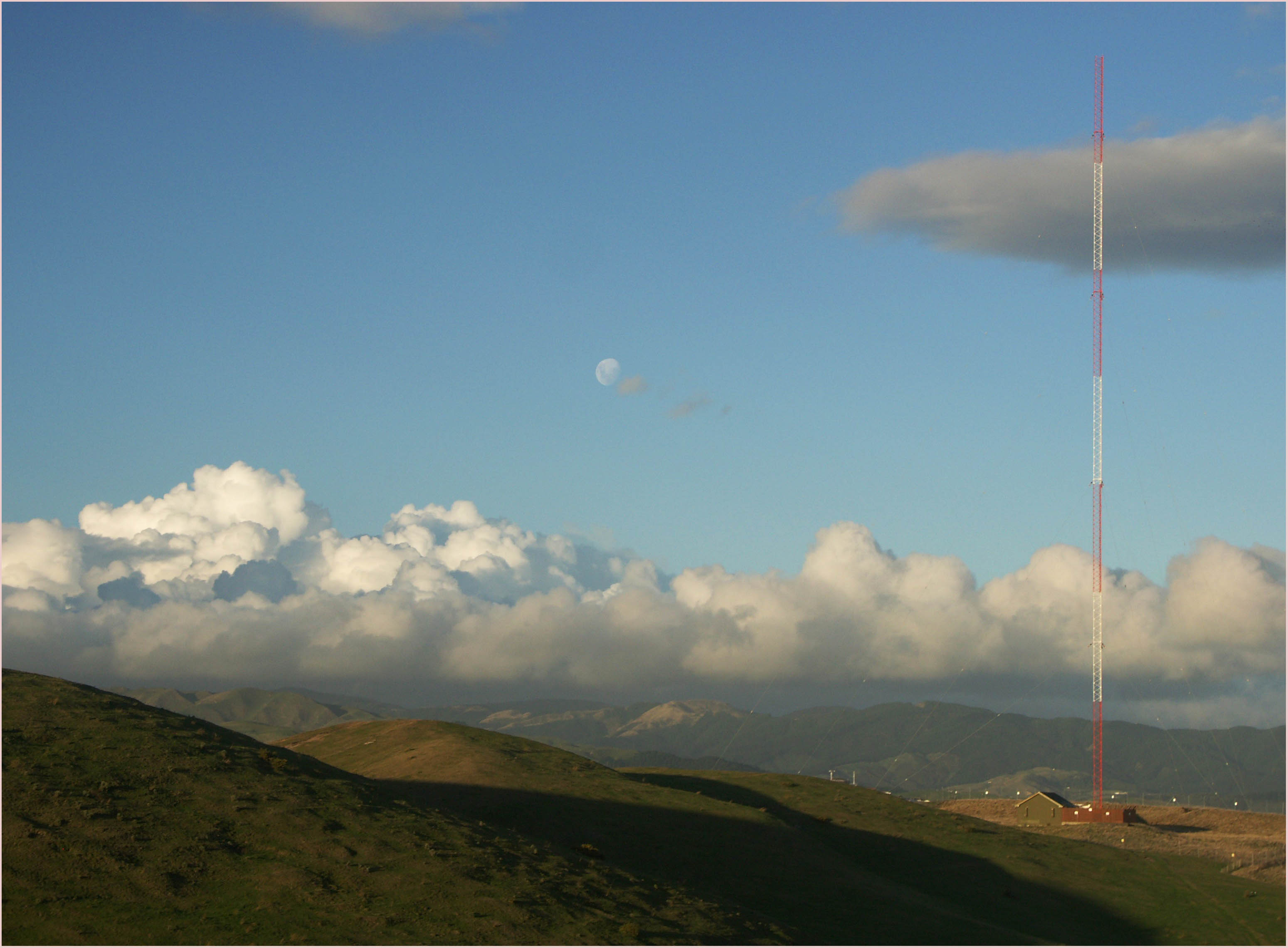
Titahi Bay Antenna Mast

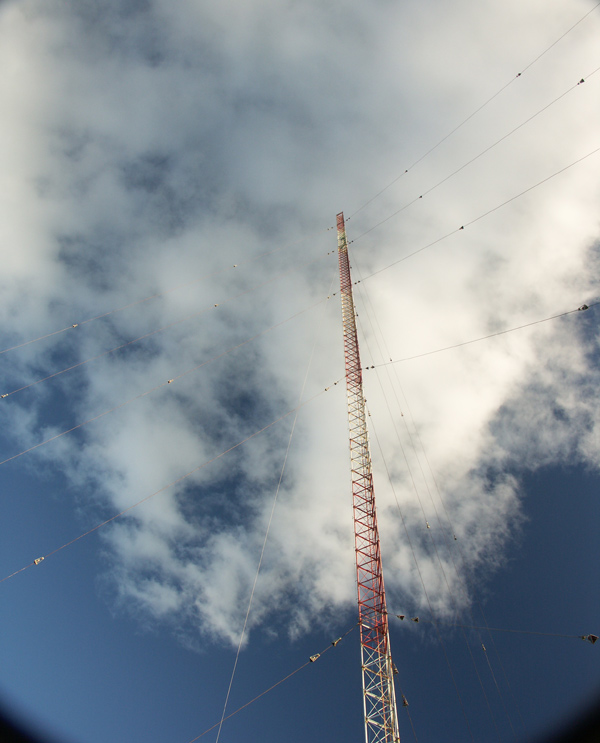
Titahi Bay Antenna Mast

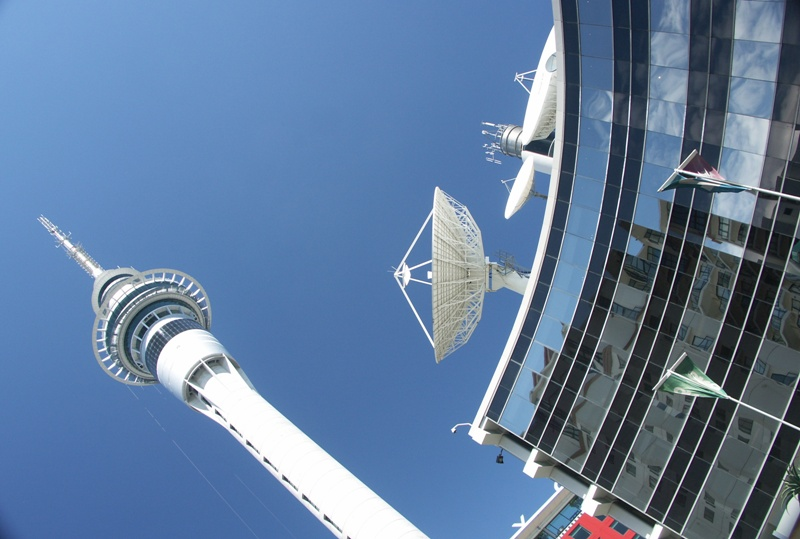
Sky Tower

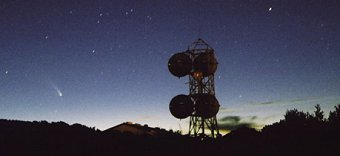
Microwave Tower Wellington

== See also ==
- Radio mast
- List of masts
- Goodnight Kiwi
- Titahi Bay Transmitter
- Sky Tower
