= The Magic Cauldron =

The Magic Cauldron may refer to:

- The Magic Cauldron (radio program), a New Zealand radio program
- "The Magic Cauldron" (essay), an essay by Eric S. Raymond

== See also ==
- The Black Cauldron (disambiguation)
