= Waiatarua =

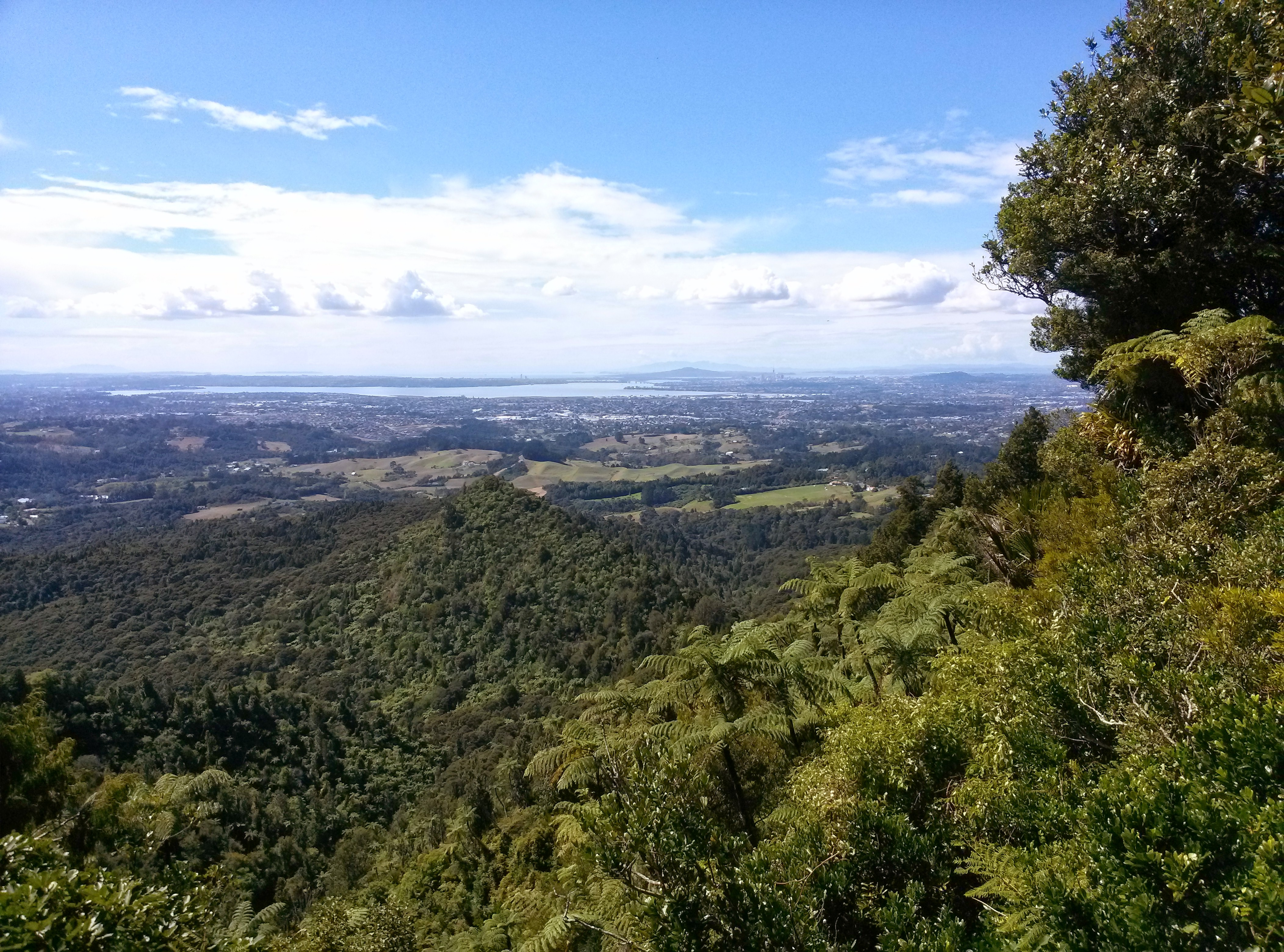
- Waiatarua and Oratia looking towards Auckland, from the Waitākere Ranges
- Interactive map of Waiatarua
- Coordinates: 36°56′S 174°35′E
- Country: New Zealand
- Region: Auckland
- Ward: Waitākere ward
- Local board: Waitākere Ranges Local Board
- Electorates: Waitākere; Tāmaki Makaurau

Government
  - Territorial Authority: Auckland Council
  - Mayor of Auckland: Wayne Brown
  - Waitākere MP: Vanushi Walters
  - Tāmaki Makaurau MP: Oriini Kaipara

Area
  - Total: 11.37 km^{2} (4.39 sq mi)

Population (June 2025)
  - Total: 2,350
  - Density: 207/km^{2} (535/sq mi)

Waiatarua is a small settlement near the top of the Waitākere Ranges in West Auckland, close to the junction of Scenic Drive, West Coast Road and Piha Road to Piha and runs east until the junction of Scenic Drive and Mountain Road. Surrounded by native bush in the Centennial Memorial Park and the water catchment area, Waiatarua is over 300 metres above sea level and some houses are over 400 metres above sea level (higher than the Auckland Sky Tower). Waiatarua means “song of two waters”, possibly referring to the ability to see both the wild west coast, and the still, sparkling waters of the Manukau and Waitemata harbours from certain points in the area.

== History ==
The area is within the traditional rohe of Te Kawerau ā Maki, an iwi that traces their ancestry to some of the earliest inhabitants of the Auckland Region. The name Waiatarua originally referred to the upper reaches of the Big Muddy Creek and Nihotupu Stream, likely referencing the dual view of both the Waitematā and Manukau Harbours. During early European settlement, the area was interchangeably referred to as Waiatarua or Nihotupu. Waiatarua became the more popular name due to Scenic Drive resident Frederick Judson. Afterwards, the name Waiatarua was applied to a larger area.

Rose Hellaby House is a historic building transformed into a museum. Large Kauri trees were milled in Waiatarua at Mander and Bradley's Mill close to Upper Nihotupu reservoir. At the turn of the century, holidaymakers would travel by coach from Glen Eden to stay at the Waiatarua guest house.

== Demographics ==
The Waiatarua statistical area, which extends northeast of the settlement, covers 11.37 km^{2} (4.39 sq mi) and had an estimated population of 2,350 as of June 2025, with a population density of 207 people per km^{2}.

Historical population
Year	Pop.	±% p.a.
2006	1,989	—
2013	2,208	+1.50%
2018	2,304	+0.85%
2023	2,307	+0.03%
The 2006 population is for a smaller area of 11.28 km^{2}. Source:

Waiatarua had a population of 2,307 in the 2023 New Zealand census, an increase of 3 people (0.1%) since the 2018 census, and an increase of 99 people (4.5%) since the 2013 census. There were 1,170 males, 1,122 females and 15 people of other genders in 768 dwellings. 4.0% of people identified as LGBTIQ+. The median age was 42.8 years (compared with 38.1 years nationally). There were 414 people (17.9%) aged under 15 years, 363 (15.7%) aged 15 to 29, 1,143 (49.5%) aged 30 to 64, and 387 (16.8%) aged 65 or older.

People could identify as more than one ethnicity. The results were 86.0% European (Pākehā); 13.7% Māori; 5.9% Pasifika; 8.2% Asian; 2.0% Middle Eastern, Latin American and African New Zealanders (MELAA); and 2.2% other, which includes people giving their ethnicity as "New Zealander". English was spoken by 96.9%, Māori language by 2.3%, Samoan by 1.7%, and other languages by 12.7%. No language could be spoken by 1.8% (e.g. too young to talk). New Zealand Sign Language was known by 0.9%. The percentage of people born overseas was 25.4, compared with 28.8% nationally.

Religious affiliations were 25.1% Christian, 1.4% Hindu, 1.0% Islam, 0.4% Māori religious beliefs, 0.7% Buddhist, 0.4% New Age, 0.1% Jewish, and 0.9% other religions. People who answered that they had no religion were 63.5%, and 6.8% of people did not answer the census question.

Of those at least 15 years old, 537 (28.4%) people had a bachelor's or higher degree, 996 (52.6%) had a post-high school certificate or diploma, and 354 (18.7%) people exclusively held high school qualifications. The median income was $47,500, compared with $41,500 nationally. 348 people (18.4%) earned over $100,000 compared to 12.1% nationally. The employment status of those at least 15 was that 1,002 (52.9%) people were employed full-time, 294 (15.5%) were part-time, and 36 (1.9%) were unemployed.

== Community facilities ==
Community facilities include a fire station, community hall, play centre, library, café and hotel.

== Tourism ==
The nearby Arataki Visitor Centre proves information about the local flora, fauna and geology, and is the starting point for a number of well-maintained walking trails.

== Tramping ==
The Waiatarua area includes the Upper and Lower Nihotupu water reservoirs. Leading to these reservoirs are scenic walking trails through native forest past waterfalls. These trails connect with the wider network of walking trails within Waitakere Regional Park. Many other tramping tracks are in the area. The nearest centres to Waiatarua are Titirangi village, Swanson, and the Henderson Valley.

== Education ==
The local state primary schools are Oratia School and Henderson Valley School. The local state secondary schools are Kelston Boys High School and Kelston Girls' College. Catholic students usually attend St Dominic's College in Henderson (girls), Liston College in Henderson (boys) or commute by train from Henderson to Marist College in Mount Albert (girls) or St Peter's College in Grafton (boys). School buses departing from nearby Titirangi village service schools in central Auckland including Epsom Girls' Grammar School, St Cuthbert's College, Auckland and Diocesan School for Girls, Auckland.

== Radio and television mast ==
A transmission mast is located in the area. The Freeview UHF terrestrial service is transmitted to many areas in Auckland. A transmitter for Kordia's Digital Audio Broadcasting (DAB) trial is also located here. FM radio services used to be transmitted but these were transferred to the Auckland Sky Tower.

== See also ==
- New Zealand masts
