= Titahi Bay Transmitter =

Coordinates: 41°5′46″S 174°50′34″E

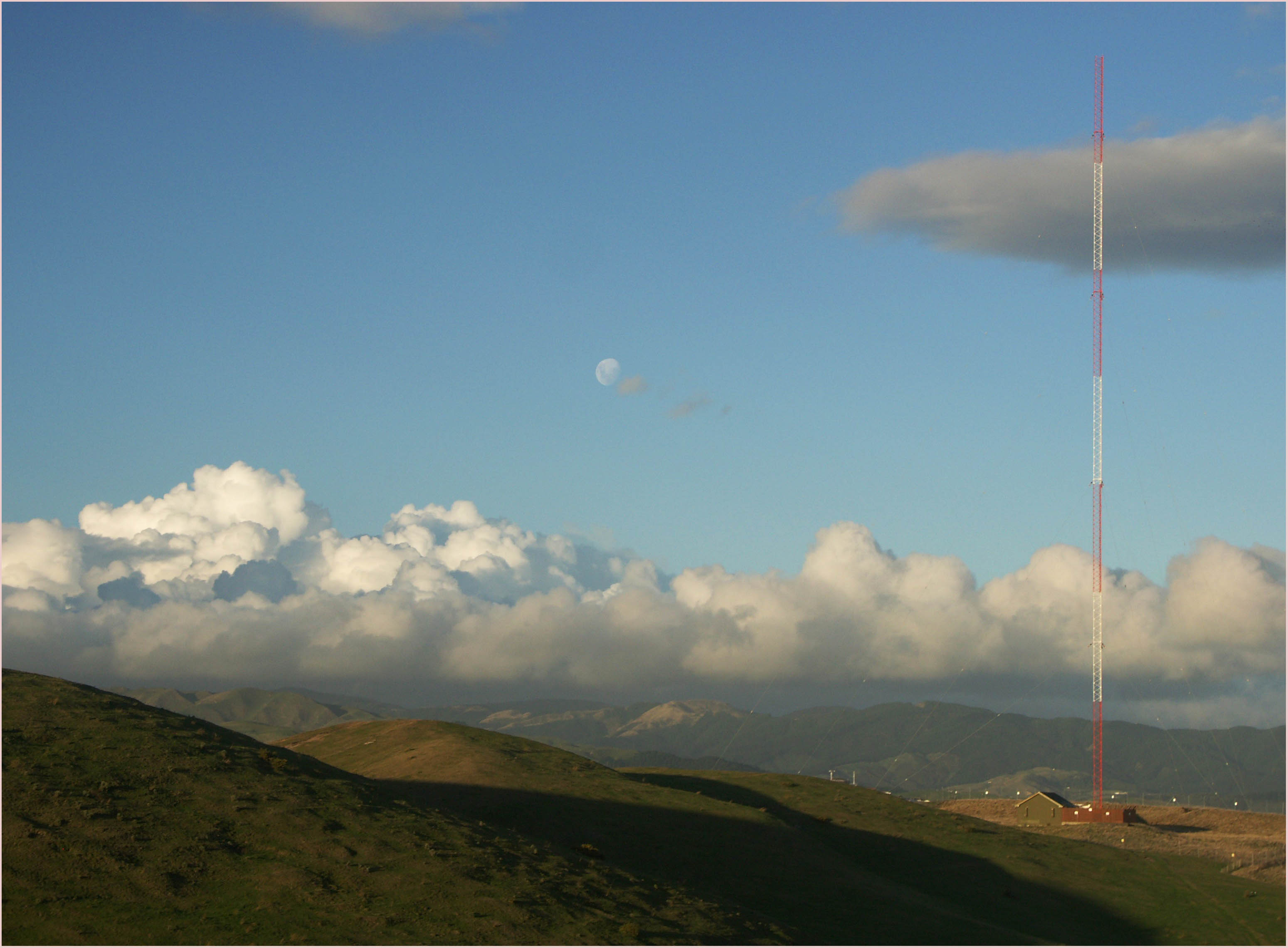
Mast of Titahi Bay transmitter

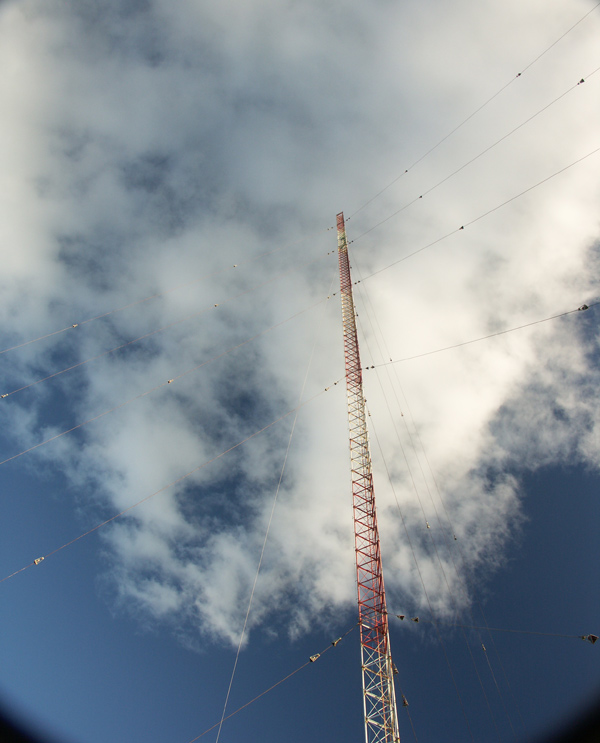
Mast of Titahi Bay transmitter

The Titahi Bay Transmitter, which until 16 February 2016 was New Zealand's second tallest structure, transmitted AM radio signals from a 220 metres tall radio mast insulated against ground at Titahi Bay in New Zealand.

== History ==
The station which previously had three masts, now consists of only one mast with a height of 137 metres. A third – smaller – mast with a height of 53 metres was toppled on 10 November 2015. The tower's surrounding buildings were opened in 1937. Five radio programmes broadcast on four frequencies from the tower:

1. Radio New Zealand National on 567 kHz
2. Star and AM Network on 657 kHz
3. Newstalk ZB on 1035 kHz
4. Te Upoko O Te Ika on 1161 kHz

In 2004 the tower was refurnished, badly corroded parts were removed and replaced, the whole tower was sand-blasted and repainted, and an array of LED warning lights were added at the behest of the NZCAA.

According to workers refurbishing it, scaling the tower takes 45 minutes. From the top there are views of the entire Kapiti coast region.

The site formerly transmitted Radio New Zealand's shortwave service, these broadcasts used a series of shorter free-standing masts supporting curtain arrays.

Under the right conditions, the AM signal for National Radio can be received as far north as Norfolk Island and as far south as Dunedin.

The Department of Conservation owns the land surrounding the tower, which is leased to Radio NZ for the transmitting towers, to the local Titahi Golf Club, and as farm land. The site is located within Whitirea Park, and is planned to come under the control of the Greater Wellington Regional Council.

Only in recent years has the station's emergency power generator been replaced. The previous one, supplied by the American military after the Second World War, formed part of the driving machinery of a submarine which was no longer required.

The site was never used for overseas telephone links, which (before the advent of undersea cables and satellites) were provided by two New Zealand Post Office radio stations, Makara Radio (receiving) west of Wellington and Himatangi radio station (transmitting) near Himatangi Beach. Only a limited number of voice circuits were available, and overseas toll calls were expensive.

== Demolition ==
On 14 October 2015, it was announced that the tallest tower (220 metres) would be removed by March 2016, due to health and safety concerns caused by corrosion issues. The smallest tower (53 metres) was demolished on 10 November 2015. On 16 February 2016, the tallest tower was demolished.

The remaining 137m-high mast is now responsible for all transmitting duties, relocated to the former site of the 220m mast.

== See also ==
- List of tallest structures in New Zealand
