= Himatangi radio station =

Himatangi Radio Station was a High Frequency (HF) Transmitting station operated by the New Zealand Post Office (NZPO). It was sited near Foxton at a location chosen because of excellent all-around look angles and good ground conductivity, both desirable attributes for an HF station.

It was the 'mouth' and Makara Radio was the 'ears' for international telephone calls and telegraph traffic. The common point for connection into the public telephone network was the Telephone Operator (TO) in Wellington. The control terminal was located on the ground floor of the telephone exchange building in Stout Street and was staffed 24/7 by Carrier and Toll technicians.

Opened in 1953 with a radiotelephone call between the Postmasters-General of New Zealand and Great Britain, it operated until 1993 when it was closed down and stripped.

On-site accommodation was provided at nominal rental for technicians in the windbreak-surrounded village near State Highway 1: In the houses for married men and their families, and for up to 16 single men in the Hostel.

Continuous '24/7' operation was achieved by three shifts a day, with a senior technician in charge of a shift, and a junior technician. Maintenance was performed during the weekdays from 8am to 4:30pm by the same staff of technicians as part of a roster.
