= Pirate FM (Wellington) =

Coordinates: 41.2995°S 174.7812°E

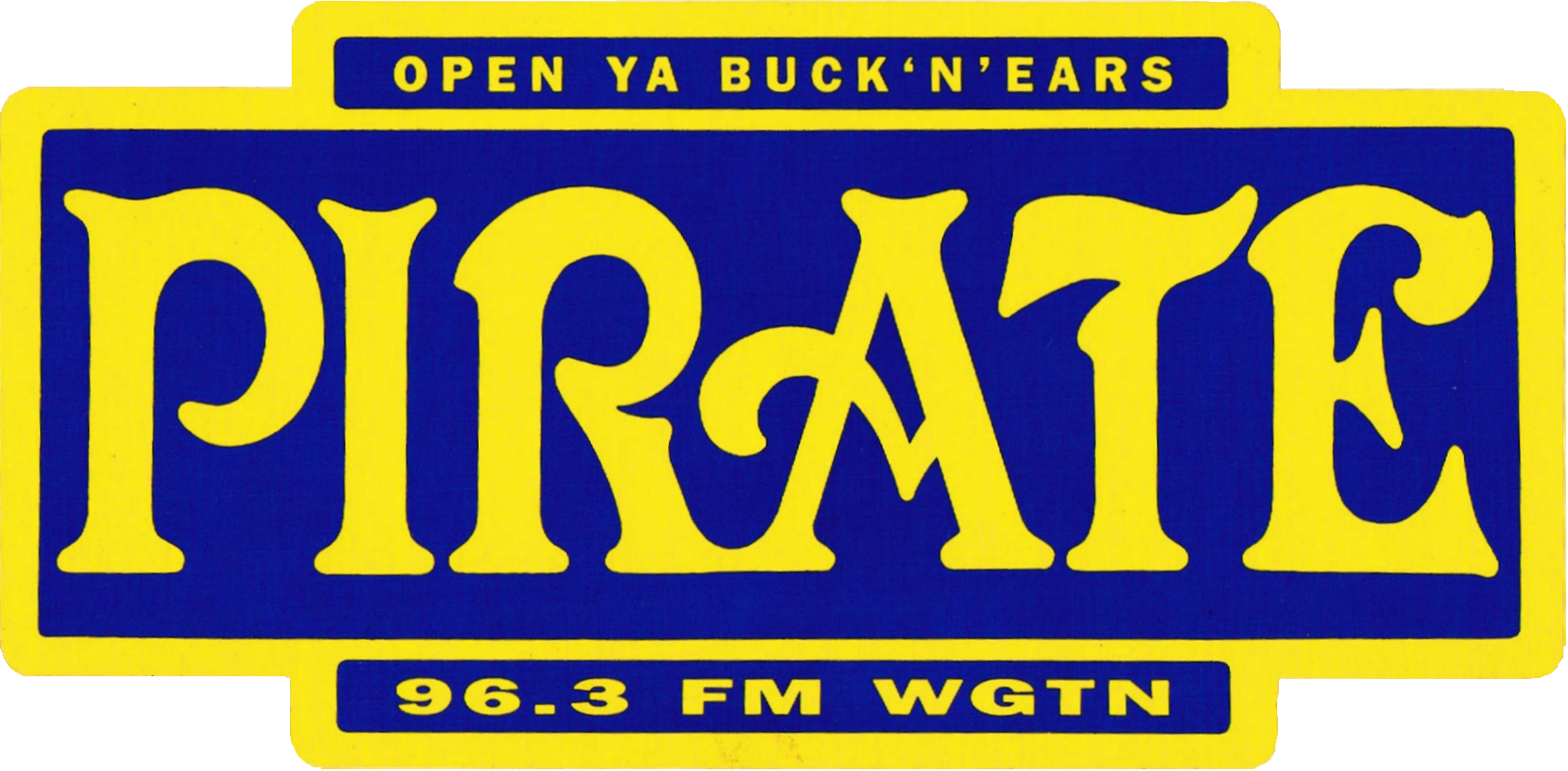
- Wellington, New Zealand; New Zealand
- Frequency: 98.9 and later 96.3
- Branding: Pirate FM

Programming
- Format: Music (Rock)

Ownership
- Owner: Derek Archer

History
- First air date: early 1990
- Last air date: 1999

Technical information
- Class: Terrestrial

Pirate FM was a radio station in Wellington, New Zealand on 96.3 FM before it was replaced by The Rock in early 1999. The station was primarily operated by DJ Derek Archer.

== History ==
Archer ran Crescendo studio in Wellington at 99 Kent Terrace above the "Car Stereo Company". In early 1990, he began Fun and Music 99FM at 98.9 MHz.

Archer ran the station with business partners and support from local business. The station aimed for minimal advertising on air.

The station was taken off the air in July 1990 due to the NZ radio frequency tender and lost its frequency to More FM Wellington. Archer continued to broadcast from this frequency becoming known as Pirate FM "Farc 'em All", where FARC referred to "False Acquisition of Radio Control". In April 1991, it ceased broadcasting. The 98.9 MHz frequency was used to launch 99-100 More FM the following month.

In 1993 Pirate FM was restarted in the flat at Archer's place in Roseneath on 96.3 MHz after he successfully engineered a new frequency despite being told that none were available in the Wellington area. The cost to do this was $60,000.

In 1995 an arson attempt effectively destroyed the station.

Archer was the subject of a number of complaints to the Broadcasting Standards Authority. One such complaint was made by his ex-wife after he made a number of threats on air.

In September 1998, Archer died from a heart attack at age 45, after collapsing at a furious debate between the candidates for the Wellington mayoralty election. Pirate FM died with him. The frequency was acquired that December by Radio Pacific/RadioWorks Group for NZ$600,000 and used to launch The Rock FM in Wellington in February 1999.
