= Kix FM =

Community radio station in Kangaroo Island, Australia

Coordinates: 35°39′16″S 137°38′24″E

Kix FM 90.7 (call sign: 5KIX) is a community radio station on Kangaroo Island, South Australia.
