= Sky Tower (Auckland) =

Observation and communication tower in Auckland, New Zealand

- The tower within the SkyCity Auckland complex

Record height
- Tallest in the Southern Hemisphere from 1996 to 2022^{[I]}
- Preceded by: Sydney Tower
- Surpassed by: Thamrin Nine

General information
- Status: Completed
- Type: Communications, observation, mixed use, tourism
- Location: Auckland CBD, Auckland, New Zealand, Corner Victoria and Federal Streets
- Coordinates: 36°50′54″S 174°45′44″E
- Construction started: 1994
- Completed: 1997
- Opening: 3 August 1997; 29 years ago
- Cost: NZ$85 million
- Owner: Skycity Entertainment Group

Height
- Antenna spire: 328 m (1,076.1 ft)
- Roof: 237 m (777.6 ft)
- Top floor: 222 m (728.3 ft)
- Observatory: 220 m (721.8 ft)

Technical details
- Floor area: 5,500 m^{2} (59,202 sq ft)
- Lifts/elevators: 4

Design and construction
- Architect: Craig Craig Moller Ltd.
- Developer: Harrah's Entertainment
- Structural engineer: Beca Group
- Main contractor: Fletcher Construction

Website
- www.skycityauckland.co.nz/attractions/sky-tower

The Sky Tower is a telecommunications and observation tower in Auckland, New Zealand. Located at the corner of Victoria and Federal Streets within the city's CBD, it is 328 metres (1,076 ft) tall, as measured from ground level to the top of the mast, making it the second-tallest freestanding structure in the Southern Hemisphere, surpassed only by the Autograph Tower in Jakarta, Indonesia, and the 28th tallest tower in the world. Since its completion in 1997, the Sky Tower has become an iconic landmark in Auckland's skyline, due to its height and design. It was the tallest freestanding structure in the Southern Hemisphere from 1996 to 2022.

The tower is part of the SkyCity Auckland casino complex, originally built in 1994–1997 for Harrah's Entertainment. Several upper levels are accessible to the public, attracting an average of 1,150 visitors per day (over 415,000 per year).

== Public facilities ==
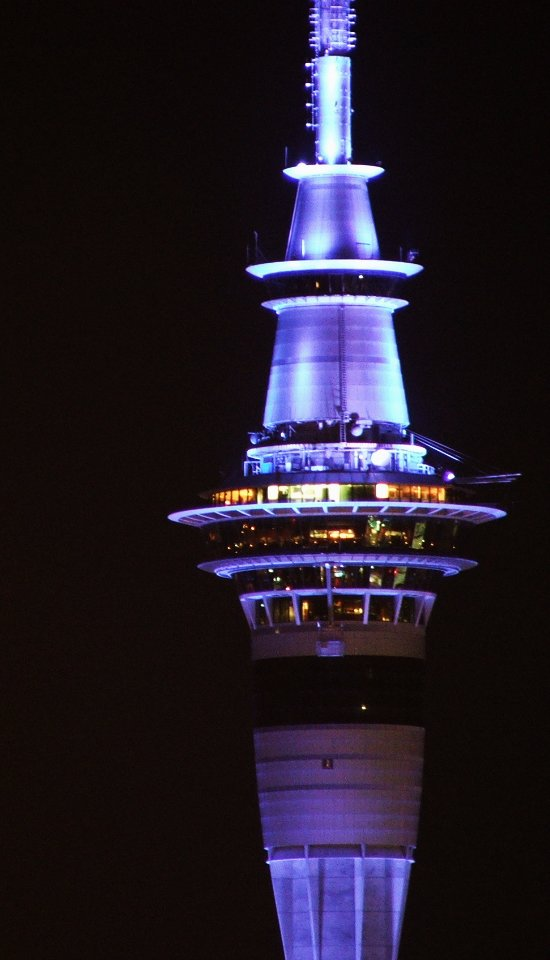
The upper sections of the Sky Tower, illuminated at night

The Sky Tower has several upper levels that are accessible to the public:

- Level 50: Sky Bar
- Level 51: Main Observation Deck
- Level 52: Orbit 360° Dining
- Level 53: The Lookout observation deck and ice creamery, SkyWalk and SkyJump
- Level 60: Sky Deck

The upper portion of the tower contains two restaurants and a cafe; including New Zealand's only revolving restaurant, located 190 m (620 ft) from the ground, which turns 360 degrees every hour. There is also a brasserie-style buffet located one floor above the main observatory level. It has three observation decks at different heights, each providing 360-degree views of the city. The main observation level at 186 m (610 ft) has 38 mm (1.5 in) thick glass sections of flooring giving a view straight to the ground. The top observation deck labelled "Skydeck" sits just below the main antenna at 220 m (720 ft) and gives views of up to 82 km (51 mi) in the distance.

The tower also features the "SkyJump", a 192-metre (630 ft) jump from the observation deck, during which a jumper can reach up to 85 km/h (53 mph). The jump is guide-cable-controlled to prevent jumpers from colliding with the tower in case of wind gusts. Climbs into the antenna mast portion (300 m or 980 ft heights) are also possible for tour groups, as is a walk around the exterior.

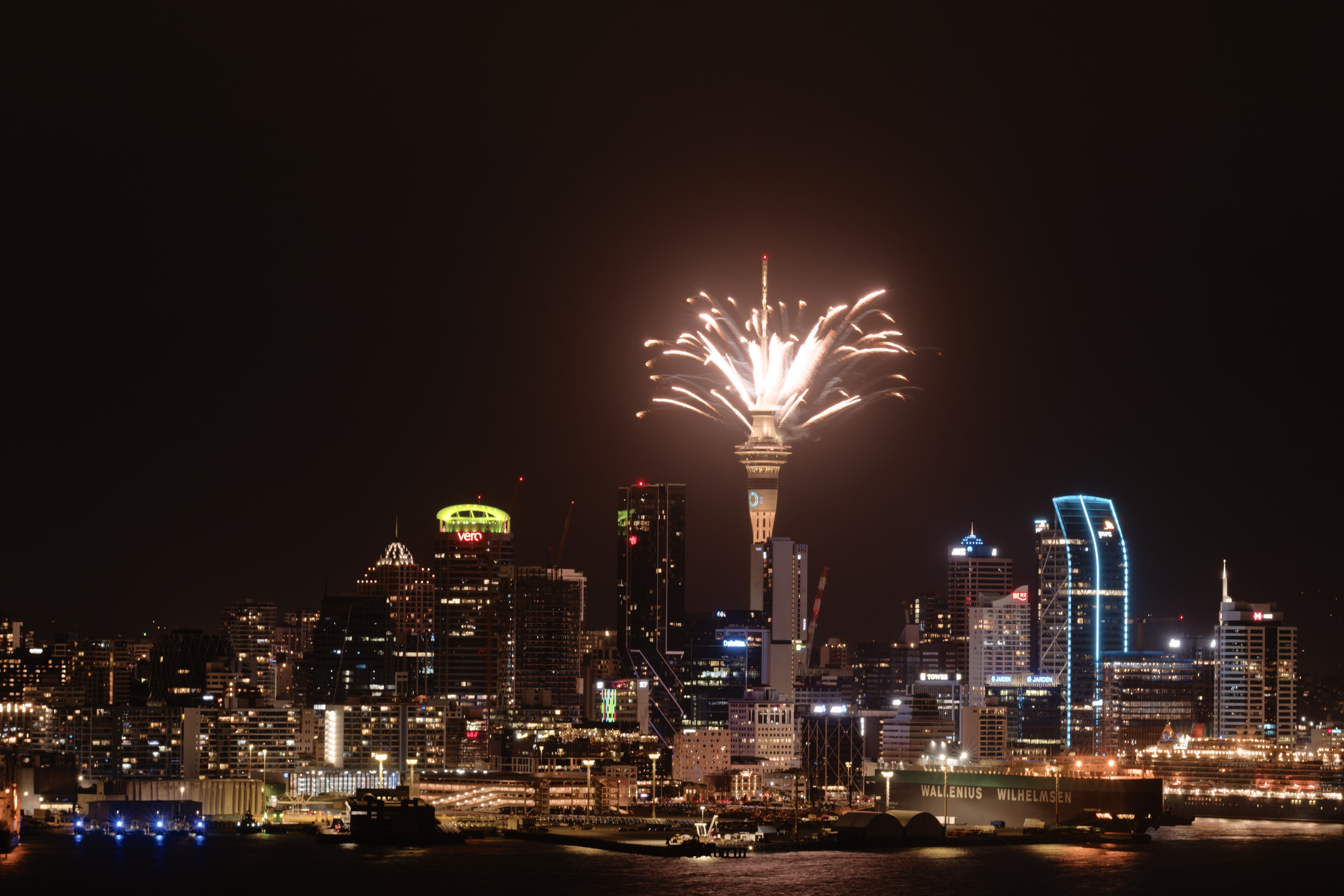
2023 New Year's fireworks display

The Sky Tower hosts fireworks displays and light shows at New Year's. The televised 2025 show featured fireworks shot at 360 degrees from three platforms. It was the highest firework display in the southern hemisphere.

== Construction ==
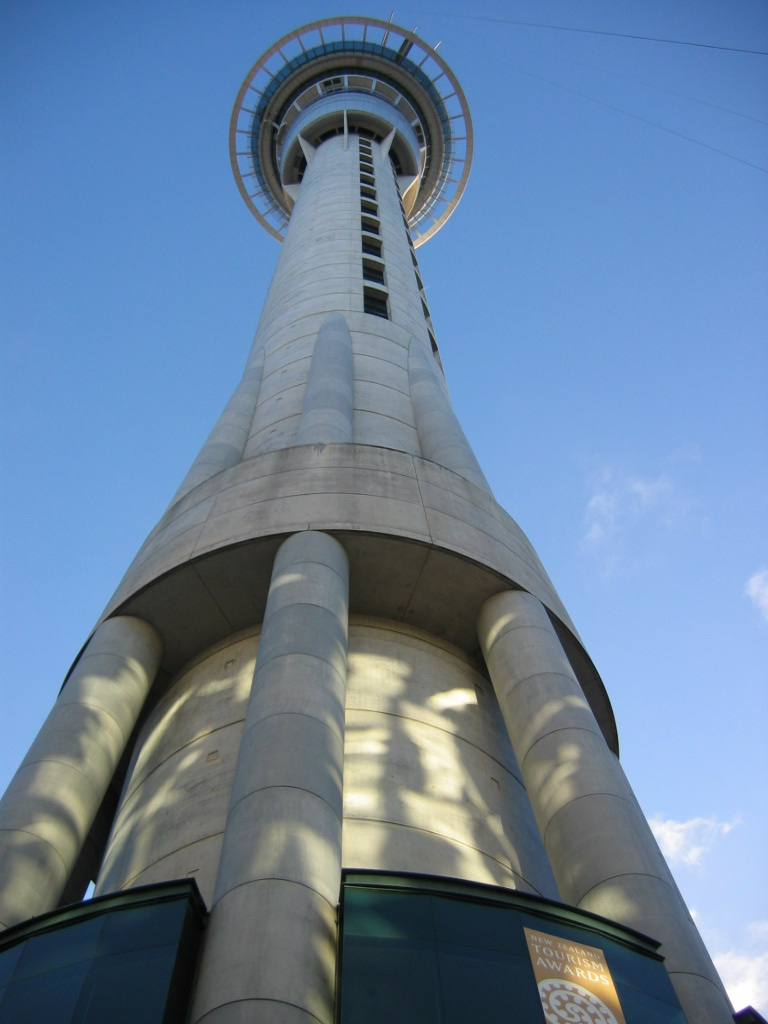
A view from the base of the tower

=== Project history ===
The first iteration of the tower was proposed to be built on Upper Symonds St in Eden Terrace alongside a shopping centre. The early-1990s plan was rejected due to viewshaft issues. An earlier version of the tower's design would have seen it clad in stainless steel, however this was not progressed due to costs.

The tower was constructed as a part of the Skycity casino precinct. The Skycity Entertainment Group's initial brief for the project were that they required a tower that was both a high-quality tourist attraction, and a marketable telecommunications facility. Fletcher Construction was the contracted builder for the project while engineering firm Beca Group provided the design management and coordination, structural, geotechnical, civil, mechanical, electrical, plumbing, lighting and fire engineering services. Harrison Grierson provided surveying services. It was designed by Gordon Moller of Craig Craig Moller Architects and has received a New Zealand Institute of Architects National Award as well as regional awards. The project architect was Les Dykstra. Taking two years and nine months to construct, the tower opened on 3 August 1997.

=== Facts and figures ===
The tower is constructed of high-performance reinforced concrete. Its 12-metre (39 ft) diameter shaft (containing four lifts and an emergency stairwell) is supported on eight "legs" based on 16 foundation piles drilled over 15 m (49 ft) deep into the local sandstone. The main shaft was built using climbing formwork.

The upper levels were constructed from composite materials, structural steel, precast concrete and reinforced concrete, and the observation decks clad in aluminium with blue/green reflective glass. A structural steel framework supports the upper mast structure. During construction 15,000 cubic metres (20,000 cu yd) of concrete, 2,000 tonnes (2,200 short tons) of reinforcing steel, and 660 tonnes (730 short tons) of structural steel were used. The mast weighs over 170 tonnes (190 short tons). It had to be lifted into place using a crane attached to the structure, as it would have been too heavy for a helicopter to lift. To then remove the crane, another crane had to be constructed attached to the upper part of the Sky Tower structure, which dismantled the big crane, and was in turn dismantled into pieces small enough to fit into the elevator.

=== Safety ===
The tower is designed to withstand wind in excess of 200 km/h (120 mph) and designed to sway up to 1 metre (39 in) in excessively high winds. As a safety precaution the Sky Tower's lifts have special technology installed to detect movement (such as swaying due to high wind) and will automatically slow down. If the building sway exceeds predetermined safety levels the lifts will return to the ground floor and remain there until the high winds and building sway have abated.

The Sky Tower is built to withstand an 8.0 magnitude earthquake located within a 20-kilometre (12 mi) radius. There are three fireproof rooms on levels 44, 45, and 46 to provide refuge in the event of an emergency, while the central service lift shaft and stairwells are also fire-safety rated.

== Telecommunications ==
The tower is also used for telecommunications and broadcasting with the Auckland Peering Exchange (APE) being located on Level 48. The aerial at the top of the tower hosts the largest FM combiner in the world which, in association with 58 wireless microwave links located above the top restaurant, provides a range of services. These include television, wireless internet, RT, and weather measurement services.

The tower is Auckland's primary FM radio transmitter site, and is one of four infill terrestrial television transmitters in Auckland, serving areas not covered by the main transmitter at Waiatarua in the Waitākere Ranges. A total of twenty-three FM radio stations and six digital terrestrial television multiplexes broadcast from the tower. Two VHF analogue television channels broadcasting from the tower were switched off in the early hours of 1 December 2013 as part of New Zealand's digital television transition.

=== Transmission frequencies ===
H = Horizontal V = Vertical

Power shown is the maximum EIRP permitted; stations may actually be running less power than shown.

The following table contains television and radio frequencies currently operating from the Sky Tower:

Television Station	Transmit Channel	Transmit Frequency	Band	Power EIRP (kW)
TVNZ digital	28	530.0 MHz	UHF	0.5 (V)
Discovery digital	32	562.0 MHz	UHF	0.5 (V)
Kordia digital B	34	578.0 MHz	UHF	0.5 (V)
Kordia digital A	36	594.0 MHz	UHF	0.5 (V)
MTS digital	38	610.0 MHz	UHF	0.5 (V)
Radio Station	Notes	Transmit Frequency	Band	Power EIRP (kW)
Mai FM		88.6 MHz	VHF	16 (V)
Newstalk ZB		89.4 MHz	VHF	50 (V)
The Rock		90.2 MHz	VHF	50 (V)
ZM		91.0 MHz	VHF	50 (V)
More FM		91.8 MHz	VHF	50 (V)
RNZ Concert		92.6 MHz	VHF	50 (V)
The Breeze		93.4 MHz	VHF	50 (V)
The Sound		93.8 MHz	VHF	8 (V)
The Edge		94.2 MHz	VHF	50 (V)
bFM		95.0 MHz	VHF	12.5 (V)
Flava		95.8 MHz	VHF	50 (V)
George FM		96.6 MHz	VHF	8 (V)
The Hits		97.4 MHz	VHF	50 (V)
Coast		98.2 MHz	VHF	50 (V)
Radio Hauraki		99.0 MHz	VHF	50 (V)
Life FM		99.8 MHz	VHF	50 (V)
Magic		100.6 MHz	VHF	50 (V)
RNZ National		101.4 MHz	VHF	16 (V)
Pacific Media Network	Previously 531 PI AM	102.2 MHz	VHF	16 (V)
Niu FM		103.8 MHz	VHF	16 (V)
Planet FM		104.6 MHz	VHF	16 (V)
iHeart Country		105.4 MHz	VHF	50 (V)
Channel X (New Zealand radio station)		106.2 MHz	VHF	20 (V)

== Lighting ==
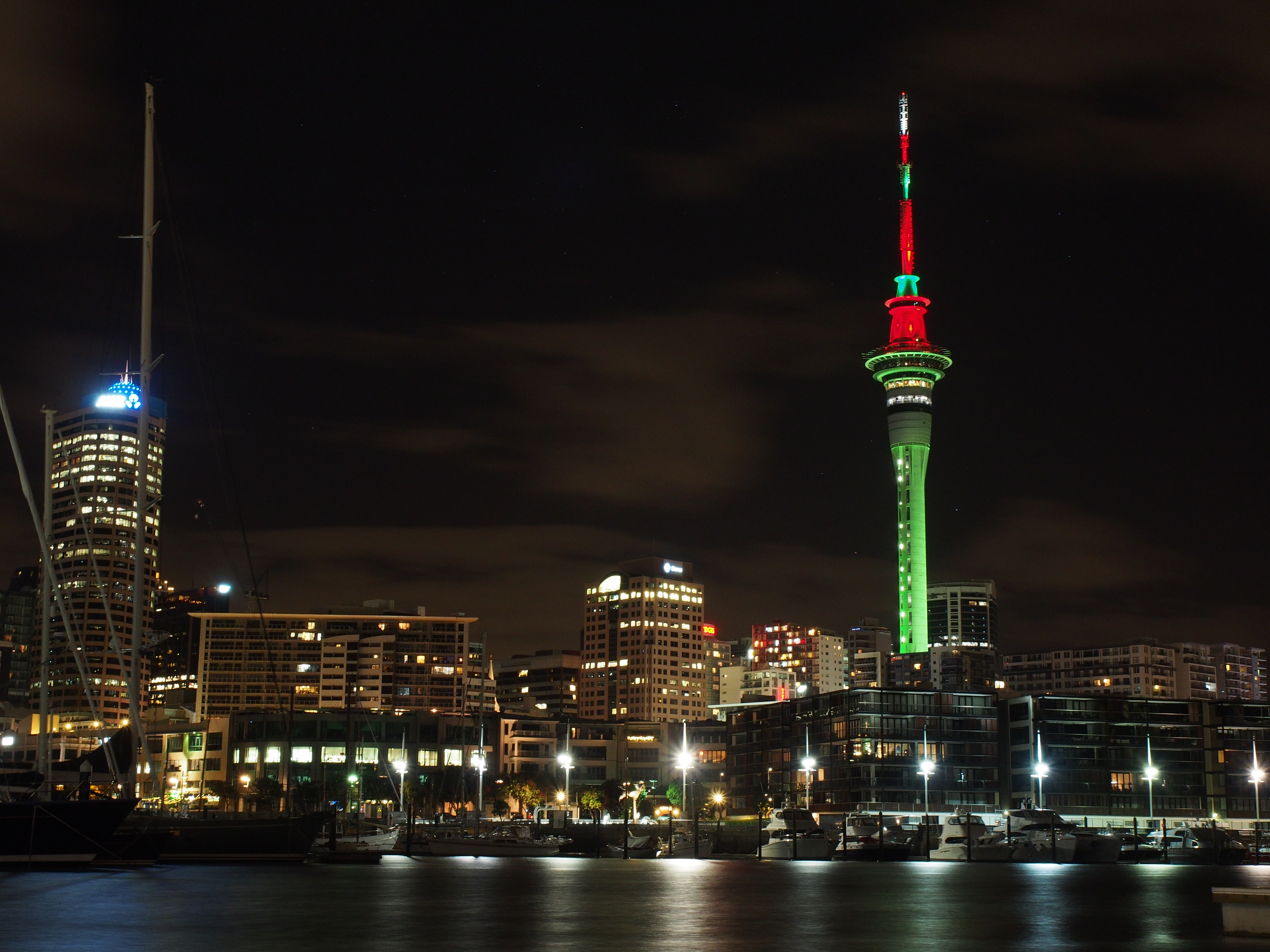
The tower illuminated in Christmas colours. Various other lighting schemes and colours are also used.

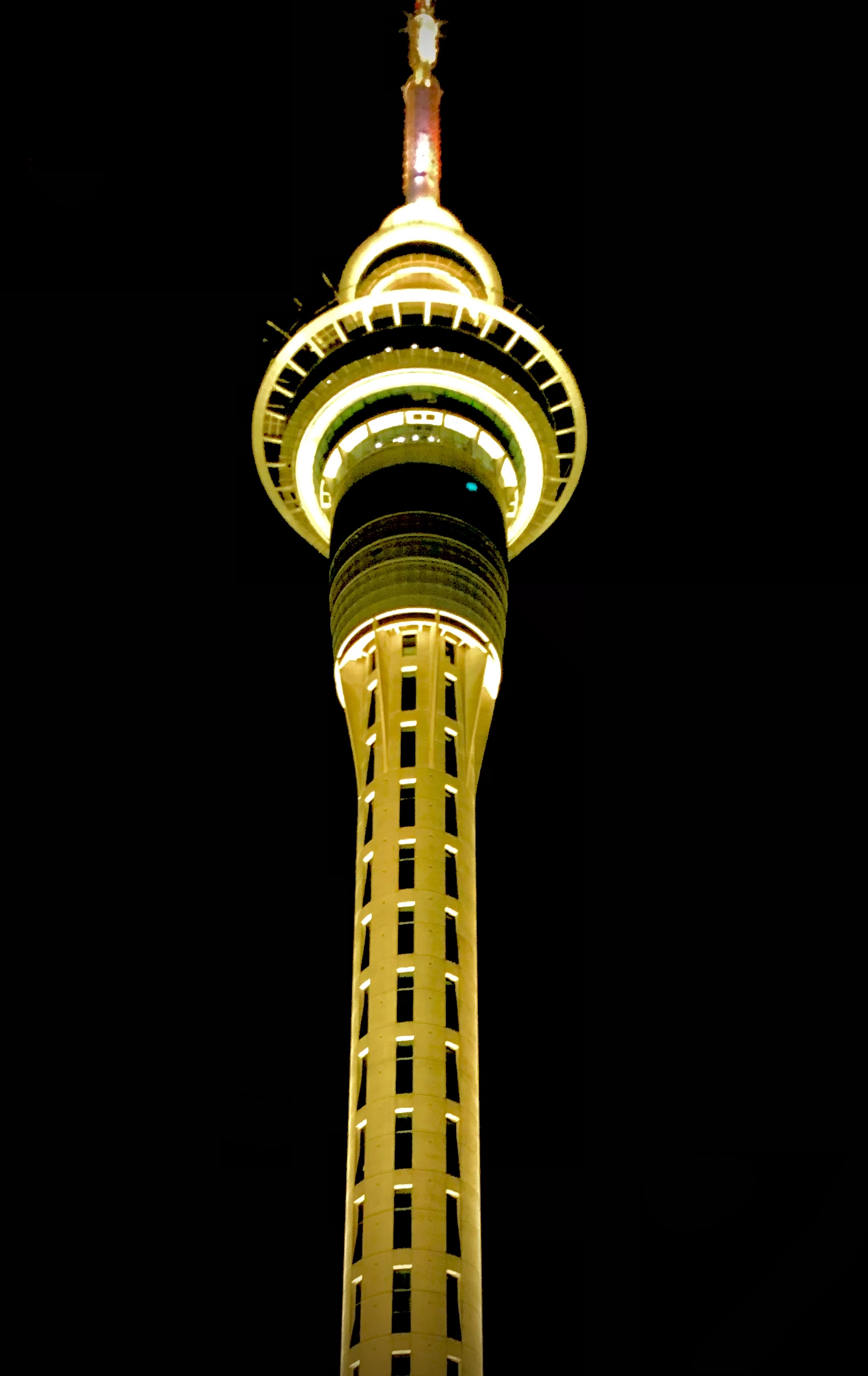
The tower illuminated in gold to mark New Zealand's first gold medal at the 2020 Summer Olympics

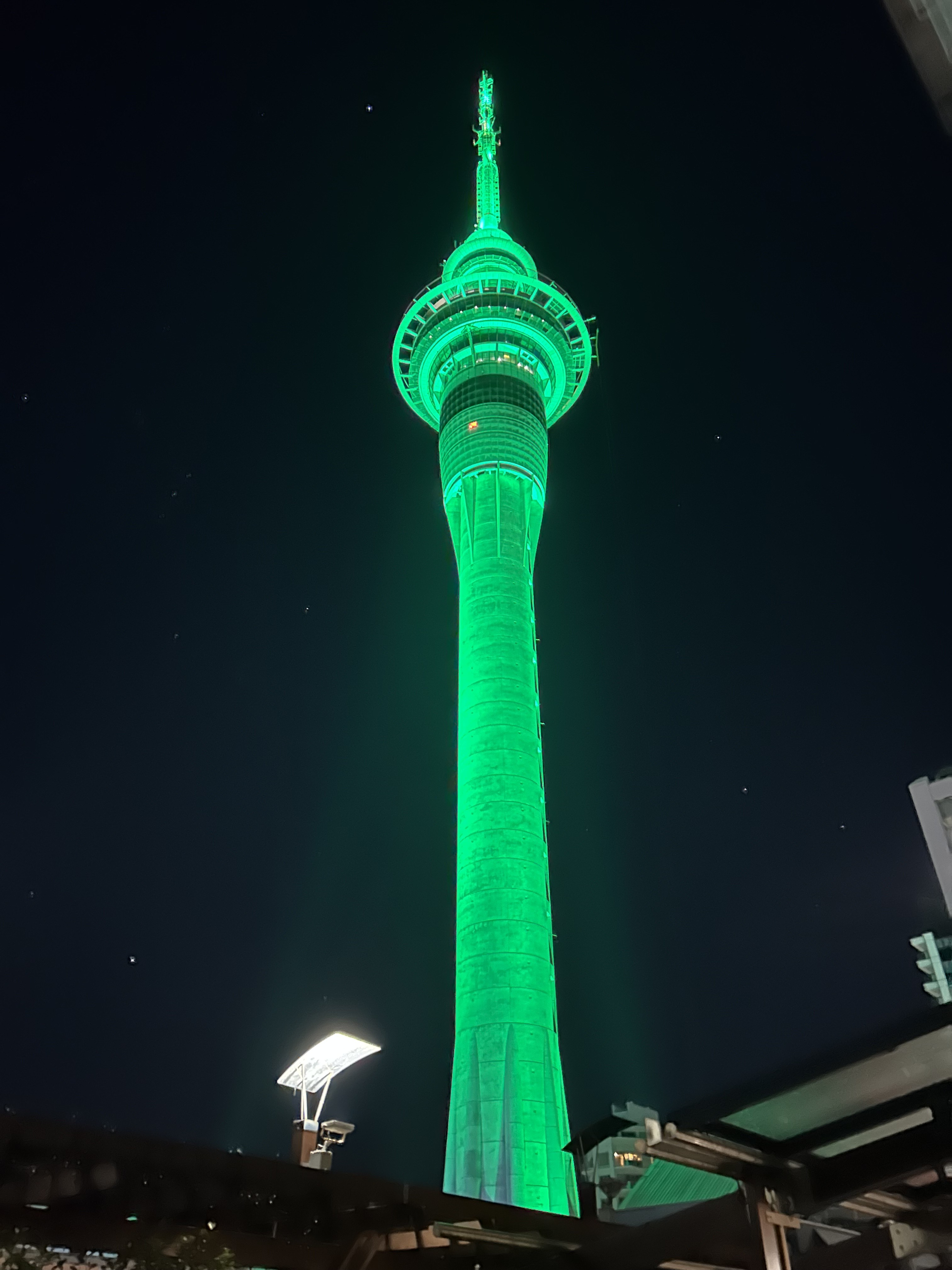
A photo of the Sky Tower on St. Patrick's Day 2025. (March 17, 9:22 PM)

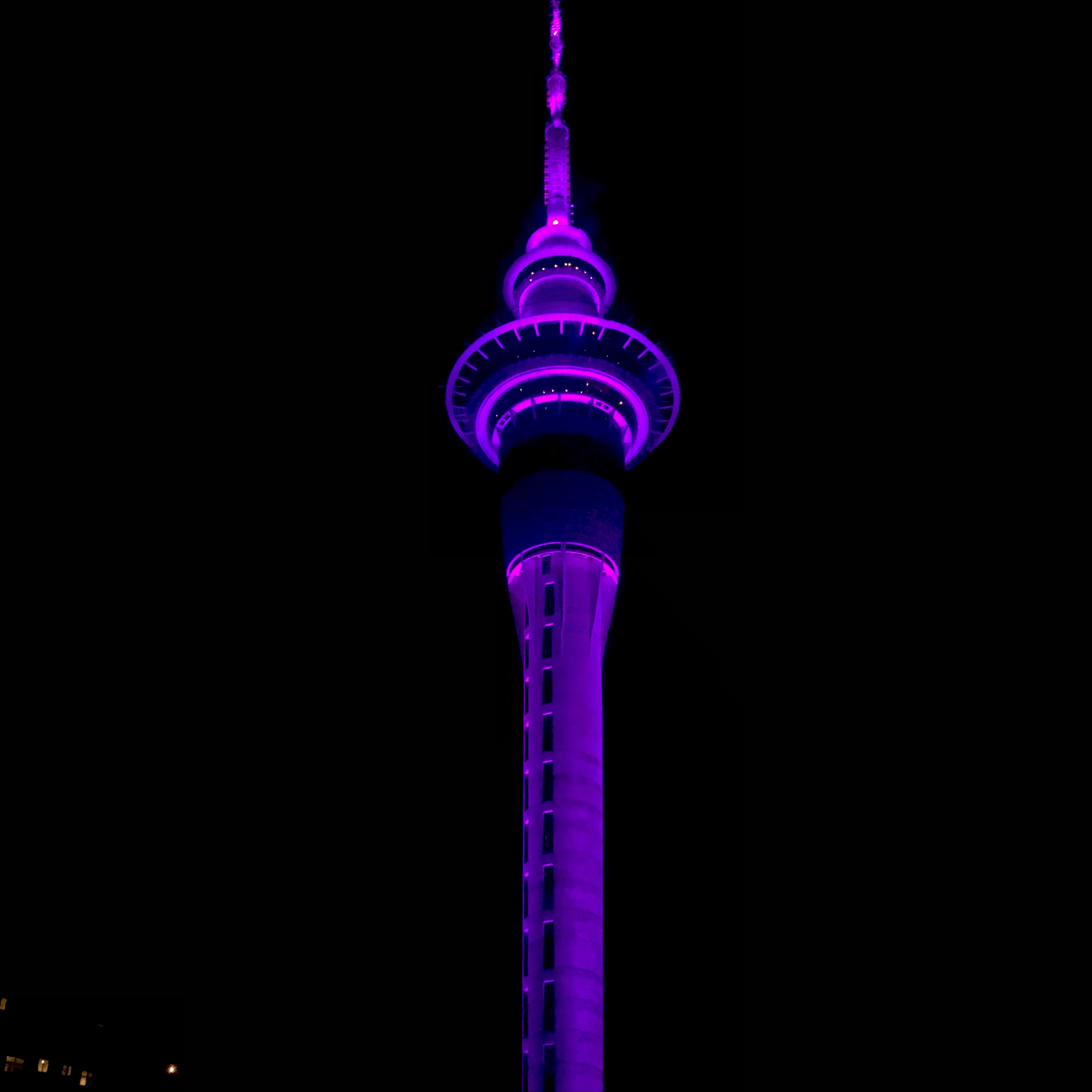
The tower illuminated in purple on 6 May 2023 to mark the coronation of Charles III and Camilla

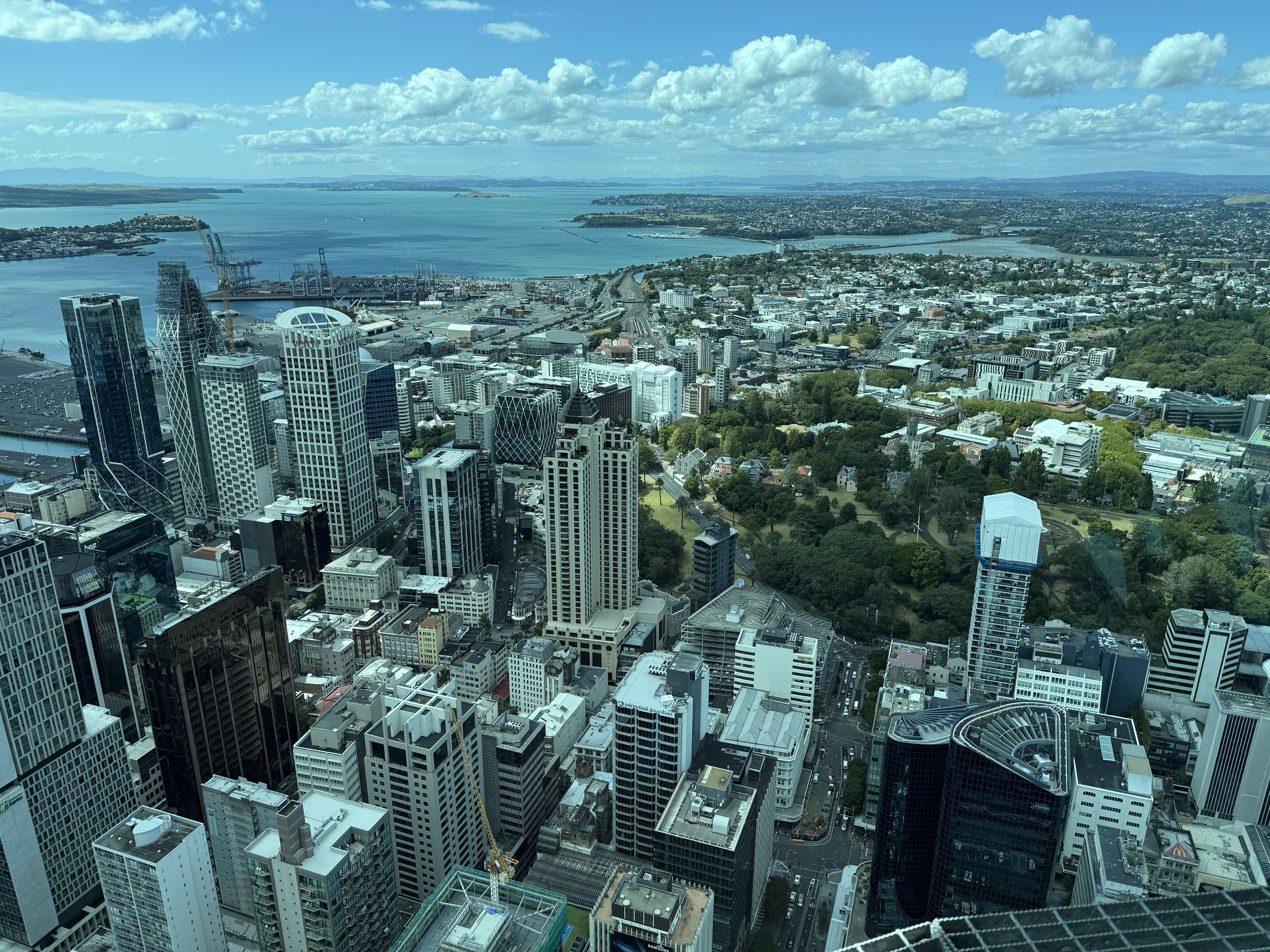
A view of Auckland from the Sky Tower.

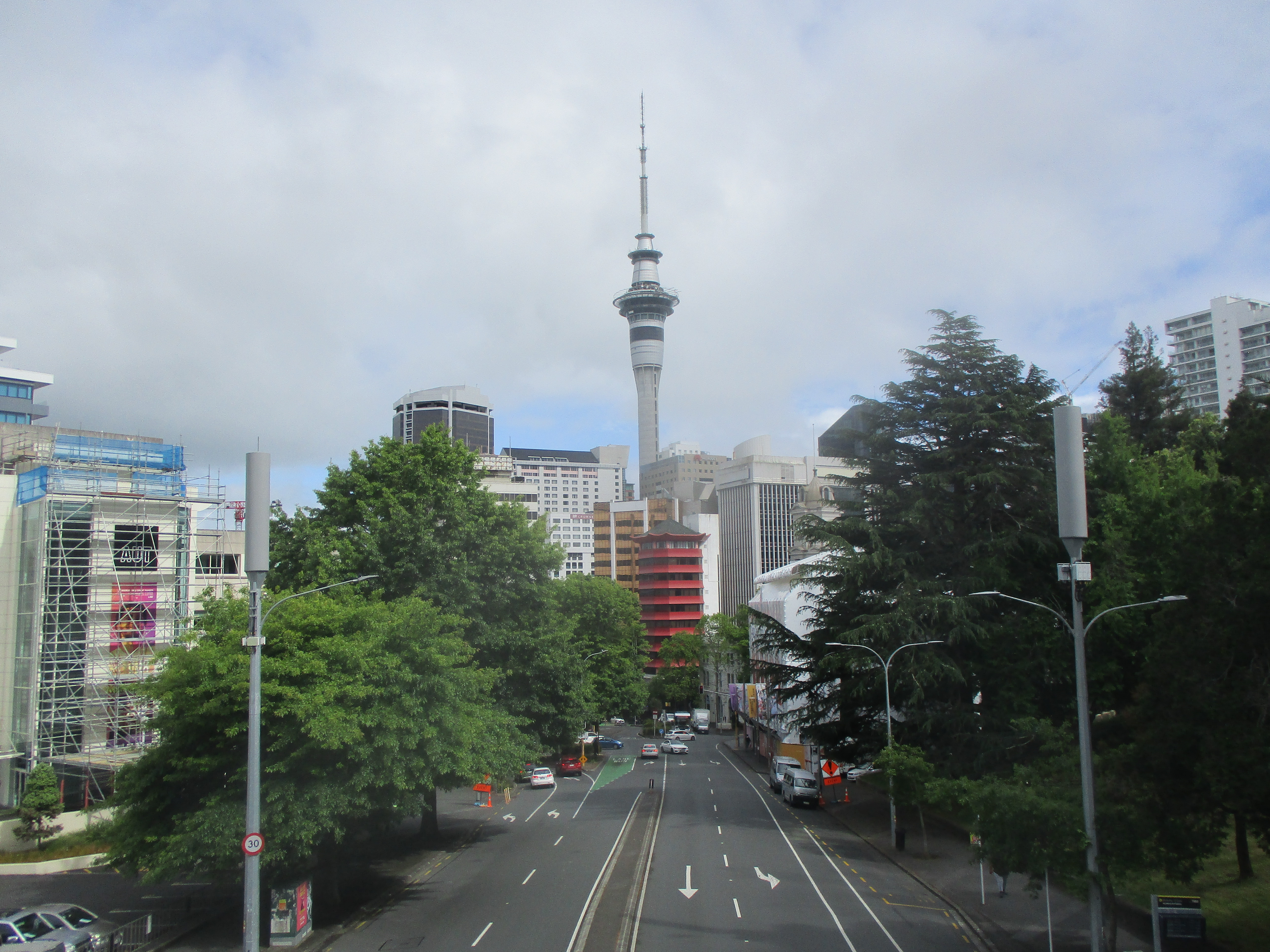
Sky Tower

SkyCity Auckland lights the Sky Tower to show support for a range of organisations and charities. SkyCity has a lighting policy and the public is invited to suggest additional occasions in line with this policy. Common lighting events include:

- All colours = New Year's Eve/New Year’s Day
- Blue = Blue September (prostate cancer awareness month in NZ)
- Pink = Breast Cancer Awareness Month or Mother's Day
- Red & Green = Christmas
- Red & Gold = Chinese New Year
- Green = Saint Patrick's Day
- Red top = Anzac Day (with Poppy emblem projection) or Cure Kids Red Nose Day (fundraising appeal for children's health research)
- Red, Orange, Yellow, Green, Blue and Purple = Pride Month
- Orange at the base fading to yellow at the top = Matariki
- Green base and yellow top = Daffodil Day (Cancer Society New Zealand)
- No lighting (except aircraft warning lights) = Earth Hour or day in memorial of the death of the monarch, the governor-general, the prime minister, any government Member of Parliament, or other important person.

The tower is lit up for special occasions. Examples include New Zealand's 2021 vaccination campaign, with the tower illuminated in blue and white when 80% and 90% vaccination rates were achieved. The tower was blue and yellow in early March 2022 in solidarity with Ukraine over the 2022 Russian invasion. After SkyCity initially refused requests from members of the public to lend support, Phil Goff as mayor of Auckland intervened and the Sky Tower was one of three Auckland landmarks that was lit up for three days (the others were the Auckland Harbour Bridge and Auckland War Memorial Museum). The tower went blue to honour the death of Constable Matthew Hunt. Also in March 2022, the tower was red celebrating the Auckland Arts Festival.

=== Energy efficient lighting ===
The top half of the Sky Tower is lit by energy efficient LED lighting which replaced the original metal halide floodlights in May 2009. The LEDs can produce millions of different colour combinations controlled by a DMX lighting controller. The original lights used 66 per cent more energy than the current LED system. The bottom half remained lit by metal halide lamps, until they too were upgraded to LED lighting in 2019.

=== Energy conservation initiatives ===
In an effort to promote power saving, SkyCity turned off the tower lighting in Winter 2008, retaining only the flashing red aviation lights. SkyCity is also minimising façade flood lighting across its complex. Simon Jamieson, general manager SkyCity Auckland Hotels Group, said: "Like every New Zealander, we are concerned about the country's electricity supply, and we believe it is our responsibility to make this move to assist with the power saving request." The tower was reilluminated on 4 August in support of New Zealand athletes competing at the Beijing Olympics.

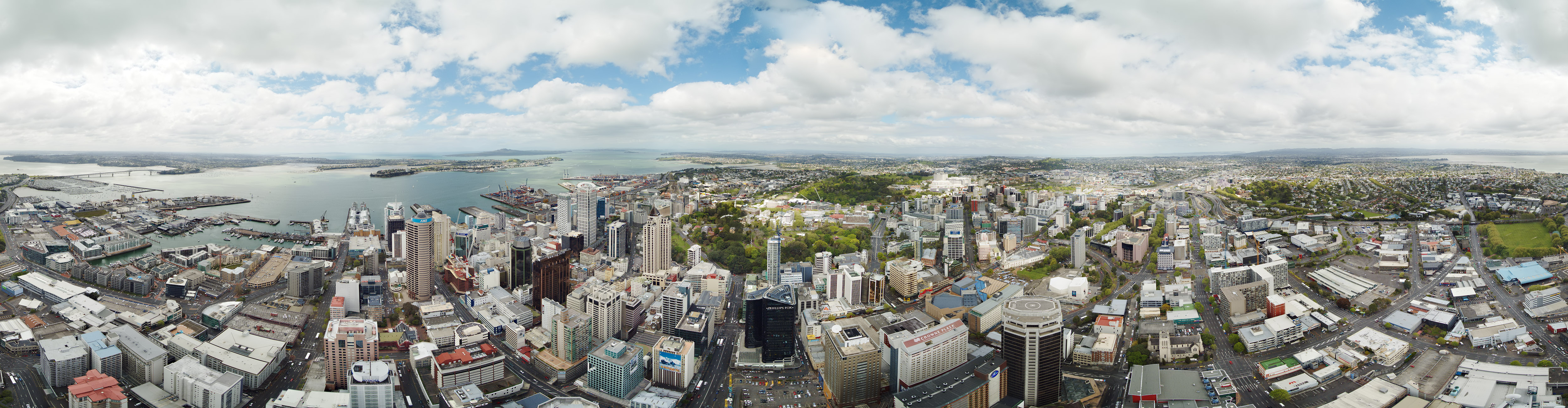
Panorama as seen from Sky Deck, Sky Tower, Auckland

=== Events ===
The Sky Tower is used in support of special charity events. The Leukemia and Blood Foundation of New Zealand organises annual fundraising stair climb challenges, notably the "Firefighters Sky Tower Stair Challenge" which sees firefighters from around New Zealand race up 1,108 steps (out of 1,267 total steps). Climbing the Sky Tower stairs has been described as a "vertical marathon".

== See also ==
- List of tallest structures in New Zealand
- Macau Tower (inspired by the Sky Tower, designed by the same company)
- Sydney Tower (the second tallest observation tower in the Southern Hemisphere)
