= Fleet FM =

Radio station in New Zealand

Fleet FM logo

Fleet FM is a low-power non-commercial co-operative radio station which has previously broadcast permanently in Auckland and Wellington, New Zealand. It broadcast in Auckland on 88.3FM and in Wellington on 107.3FM. It was founded on 18 July 2003.

The station was unique in that it is being run as a completely voluntary project and is advert free. This helps to ensure the Fleet disk jockey complete artistic control. The station's listenership crosses through traditional Auckland demographics reaching a diverse audience particularly those involved in the Arts and creative industries.

Fleet has held a variety of music and art related events, such as the infamous "Convoy" gigs and Camp Fleet, when on New Years the radio station takes over a classic Kiwi school camp. Fleet members are often exhibiting art about town and sometimes in conjunction with the Pelvic Trust.

Due to a lack of funding, Fleet shut down on 21 May 2010, pending donations to make it viable again.

2011 Fleet FM was transformed into Fleet Truck, a mobile radio station broadcasting sporadically from a truck in and around the Auckland area on 88.0 FM.

2013 Fleet FM moved to a custom built shed in Arch Hill in Auckland.

2016 Fleet FM moved to Three Kings and now continues to make weekly podcasts.

== Programmes ==
=== The Bored Housewife Breakfast Show ===
The Bored Housewife Breakfast Show was broadcast Wednesday mornings from 7am-9am. Hosted by journalist Benjii Jackson, the show regularly featured bands and musicians coming into the studio as part of the "Bored Housewife Sessions", a nod to one of Jackson's influences, the late John Peel.

Features in the past have included "That's New!", "It Came From The UK" and "Battle Formation", which sees two bands battle for an area of land with the winner decided through listener interactivity (text messaging, e-mailing). However, "Battle Formation" is loosely themed around geographical locations; one episode of the show saw Dinosaur Jr. and Sebadoh battle for the use of Lou Barlow. The show also pays homage to a character known as "Alex Manford", spawning such uses of the term as "The Alex Manford Track of the Week" and "Alex Manford Approved", which defines something the hosts of the show believe is of utmost quality.

More recently, NZPWI contributor Troy Rawhiti-Forbes has joined up with Jackson on a Friday afternoon, subsequently renaming the show "The Afternoon Show", however the format of the show has not significantly altered. The breakfast show, however, is viewed as the more "serious" of the two, despite keeping the "Bored Housewife" moniker.

There is a heavy emphasis as of late on newer music, however, with the radio show having helped to an extent New Zealand artists like The Tarantinos, The Randoms, Calamity Jam, Battle Circus and Sora Shima amongst others. The show has also introduced an array of international artists to New Zealand listeners, including Colon Open-Bracket, Cajun Dance Party, Los Campesinos, Skindred and We Need Leads.

During his March 5, 2008 show, Jackson announced that he was stepping down as presenter of the Friday afternoon show due to work obligations.

The radio show finished broadcasting on Fleet FM in June 2008 due to "exhaustion".

The question of who Alex Manford is was raised weeks prior to the first Bored Housewife Radio Show live event on June 7, 2007, when "The Alex Manford Benefit Show" was held at the Schooner Tavern in Auckland. Many a story has been woven by bands and presenters who appear on Fleet FM, however Jackson officially stated who Alex Manford was in a blog posting in mid-June 2007.

The usage of Alex Manford has become an integral part of the identity of the radio show and events associated with it; in 2007 the name was used in conjunction with a live event at the now defunct Schooner Tavern and in 2008 another live event will adorn the Alex Manford name, with the MySpace page regarding the concert already containing his likeness.

=== The Magic Cauldron ===
The Magic Cauldron was a radio show hosted by Mittins & Shenanigans Monday, 9–11 am. The show included music, interviews, and prizes, and also had a regular interactive 10 am radio drama, where listeners are encouraged to contribute to the ongoing tale of 'Galoff & the three Daughters', and even submit entirely new stories to be read on air, via The Magic Cauldron's Myspace and Wordpress pages.

=== Jimmy Breakfast Show ===
Jimmy's breakfast show was simulcast on Alt TV, showing live photos of what was happening in the studio crossed with traffic shots from round the city. Amongst technical difficulties, the show persevered. Jimmy still continues his podcasts and is also making YouTube videos to keep himself entertained.
