= List of radio stations in Otago =

This is a list of radio stations in Otago in New Zealand.

== Dunedin stations ==
The following stations can be heard on the Eastern side of Otago primarily serving Dunedin City with many stations able to be received in other areas including Balclutha and Palmerston.

Frequency	Station	Format	Location/transmitter	Licensed kW	Airdate	Previous station on frequency.
88.6 FM	ZM	Contemporary hit radio	Mount Cargill	8	2019	2013–2019: Flava moved to 106.2
89.4 FM	The Hits 89.4 (previously Classic Hits 89.4, ZBFM, 4ZB)	Adult contemporary music	Mount Cargill	16	1993	
90.2 FM	The Sound (previously Solid Gold)	Classic rock	Mount Cargill	8	1999	1997: Radio Dunedin, 1997–1999: Lite FM
91.0 FM	Radio One	Student radio	Mount Cargill	2.5	1984	
91.8 FM	The Edge	Contemporary hit radio	Mount Cargill	100	1999	
92.6 FM	RNZ Concert	Classical music	Mount Cargill	32	1990	
93.4 FM	The Rock	Active rock	Mount Cargill	8	1999	1992–1997: 93Rox, 1997–1999: C93FM
94.2 FM	Life FM	Contemporary Christian music	Mount Cargill	1	2007	
95.0 FM	Tahu FM	Urban contemporary & Iwi radio	Highcliff, Otago Peninsula	3.2	2000	
95.4 FM	The Breeze	Classic hits	Saddle Hill, Mosgiel	0.32	2025	1994–1998 Mosgiel FM, 1998–2016 4XO & More FM Relay; 2016 – Jan 2025 Radio Dunedin now 106.7
95.8 FM	Radio Hauraki	Active rock	Mount Cargill	16	2019	1996–2019: ZM moved to 88.6
96.2 FM	The Hits	Adult contemporary music	Abbotsford	0.025		
96.6 FM	George FM	Dance music	Mount Cargill	40	31 March 2023	1992–2005: Radio Pacific; 2005–2019: Radio Live; 2019–20 March 2022: Magic Talk; 21 March 2022 – 30 March 2023: Today FM
97.4 FM	More FM	Adult contemporary music	Mount Cargill	40	1990	4XO
98.2 FM	The Breeze	Easy listening	Mount Cargill	40	2004	1997–2004 98 More FM
99.0 FM	RNZ Concert	Classical music	Highcliff, Otago Peninsula	0.4		
99.4 FM	RNZ Concert	Classical music	Saddle Hill	0.08		
99.8 FM	Breeze Classic	1970s	Mount Cargill	2.5	1 November 2015	2008–2015 Radio Dunedin; 2015 – 31 October 2025: Magic
100.6 FM	Channel X	90s Pop music	Mount Cargill	8	05/2023	2018–2023 More FM High School Hits 2015–2017 George FM Mai FM prior to 2015
101.4 FM	RNZ National	Public radio	Highcliff, Otago Peninsula	8	2004	
103.8 FM	PMN 531pi	Urban contemporary	Highcliff, Otago Peninsula	6.3	Jan 2019	2002 – Jan 2019: Niu FM
104.6 FM	Coast	Easy listening	Mount Cargill	8	2015 (FM frequency)	
105.4 FM	Otago Access Radio (previously Toroa Radio, Hills AM)	Access Radio	Mount Cargill	8	1990	
105.8 FM	Brian FM	Adult hits	Saddle Hill	0.3		
106.2 FM	Newstalk ZB	Talk radio	Mount Cargill	8	1 December 2024	2009 – 2019: Radio Hauraki moved to 95.8; 2019 – 1 December 2024: Flava
621 AM	Rhema	Christian radio	Three Mile Hill	16	1980s	
693 AM	iHeartCountry	Country music	Highcliff, Otago Peninsula	16	4 May 2026	1998 – 30 March 2020: Radio Sport, Sports Roundup; 30 March – 30 June 2020: Newstalk ZB; 01/07/2020-04/05/2026: Gold Sport
810 AM	RNZ National	Public radio	Highcliff, Otago Peninsula	63		previously 4YA that also broadcast on 650, 790 and 780 kHz prior to Nov 1978
900 AM	Sanctuary/AM Network	Christian radio/Legislature	Highcliff, Otago Peninsula	32		Until 14 February 2025: Star rebranded 4YC Concert Programme/Sports Roundup
954 AM	Coast	Easy listening	Centre Road	3.2	2004	2003 – 2004: Easy listening i
1044 AM	Newstalk ZB	Talk radio	Highcliff, Otago Peninsula	32	1994	1937–1994: 4ZB (4ZB previously broadcast on 1080, 1050 and 1040kHz prior to Nov 1978), ZBFM
1125 AM	Radio Hauraki	Active rock	Centre Road	3.2	2003	1995–2003: Classic Hits ZBFM
1206 AM	Sport Nation	Sports radio	Highcliff, Otago Peninsula	6.3	19 November 2024	1971–2005: 4XO, More FM; 2005–2007: Radio Pacific/Trackside; 2007–2010: BSport/Radio Trackside; 2010–2015: LiveSport/Radio Trackside; 2015–2020: TAB Trackside; 2021–2024: SENZ
1305 AM	Radio Dunedin	Oldies & Classic hits	Highcliff, Otago Peninsula	6.3	1922	Original frequency was 1430AM
1377 AM	Sanctuary	Christian radio	Three Mile Hill	3.2	2009	2009 – 14 February 2025: Star rebranded; The Word
1575 AM	Otago Access Radio (previously Hills AM, Toroa Radio)	Access radio	Centre Road	2.5	1990	

=== Dunedin LPFM stations ===
The following stations can be heard in Dunedin.

Frequency	Station	Location	Format	Airdate	Previous station on frequency / Notes.
87.6 FM		Dunedin			Flava on 106.2 FM
87.6 FM		Mosgiel			Star
87.7 FM	Country Radio (previously Country Radio 88.7 until 2012)	Dunedin South	LPFM Classic country	2005	
87.9 FM	MIX FM	Dunedin	LPFM		
88.0 FM	Rock It FM	Sawyers Bay	LPFM commercial free rock /metal		
88.1 FM	The Studio	Dunedin	LPFM Commercial-free		
88.2 FM	Classic Gold FM	Mosgiel	LPFM		
88.3 FM	Critical Analysis Broadcasting	Dunedin North	LPFM		
106.7 FM	Radio Dunedin	CBD, ASB House / Mosgiel, Saddle Hill	Oldies & Classic hits	CBD 2015 / Mosgiel 2025	–
106.9 FM	More FM	Mosgiel	Adult contemporary music		
107.3 FM	Total FM	Dunedin	LPFM Adult Contemporary	2012	
107.5 FM	XS80s	Dunedin	LPFM 1980s music	2017	
107.7 FM	Brian FM	Dunedin	Adult hits		Mai FM

== North and East Otago ==
The following stations can be heard in North and East Otago including Oamaru and Palmerston.

Frequency	Station	Format	Location	Licensed kW	Airdate	Previous station on frequency.
88.3 FM	Heritage Radio	LPFM	Oamaru	0.001		
88.4 FM	no longer licensed LPFM	LPFM	Oamaru South			RockaBilly Radio
88.8 FM	Brian FM	Adult hits	Oamaru; Cape Wanbrow	0.63		
89.6 FM	Sport Nation	Sports radio	Cape Wanbrow	0.5	19 November 2024	TAB Trackside, SENZ
90.1 FM	The Breeze	Easy listening	Otematata	0.05	28 April 2018	The Edge
91.2 FM	Oamaru FM	Classic hits/Adult contemporary music	Cape Wanbrow	0.63	2020	
94.4 FM	Breeze Classic	1970s	Cape Wanbrow	0.63	1 November 2025	until 31 October 2025: Magic
94.9 FM	Choice FM	Community radio	Otematata	0.05	2023	
95.2 FM	Life FM	Contemporary Christian music	Cape Wanbrow	0.63		
96.0 FM	The Edge	Pop Music	Cape Wanbrow	0.8	2002	1994 – 1999: Whitestone FM; 1999 – 2002: Solid Gold
96.8 FM	More FM	Adult contemporary music	Kurow; Station Peak	0.8	28 April 2018	
97.6 FM	The Breeze	Easy listening	Cape Wanbrow	0.63	2018	2016 – March 2018: XS80s
98.1 FM	More FM	Adult contemporary music	Otematata	0.05	28 April 2018	Port FM, 92.7 FM
98.4 FM	The Hits	Adult contemporary music	Cape Wanbrow	0.5		Classic Hits Radio Waitaki
99.2 FM	The Sound	Classic rock	Cape Wanbrow	0.8	2002	Solid Gold
100.0 FM	More FM	Adult contemporary music	Cape Wanbrow	0.8	28 April 2018	Port FM, Whitestone FM, Solid Gold FM
100.8 FM	Channel X	Classic alternative	Cape Wanbrow	0.8	8 May 2023	Radio Live; 2019 – 20 March 2022: Magic Talk; 21 March 2022 – 30 March 2023: Today FM
104.0 FM	Real 104FM	Adult Contemporary music	Cape Wanbrow	0.63	2016	
104.8 FM	The Rock	Active rock	Cape Wanbrow	0.8		
105.6 FM	The Sound	Classic rock	Kurow; Station Peak	0.8		
106.1 FM	Brian FM	Adult hits	Otematata	0.05	2023	
106.4 FM	Radio Rhema	Christian radio	Cape Wanbrow	0.63		
106.7 FM	Generation FM	LPFM	Oamaru	0.001		
−106.7 FM	RNZ National	Otematata	LPFM Public radio			
107.0 FM	Heritage Radio	LPFM	Oamaru	0.001		
−107.6 FM	Whitestone City Music					
756 AM	Puketapu Radio Caroline	Community radio	Palmerston	1.0	1990s	
1395 AM	Newstalk ZB	Talk radio	Oamaru Weston	6.3	2001	1980 – 2001: Radio Waitaki

== South and West Otago ==
The following stations can be heard in South Otago including Balclutha and Milton. Many Dunedin stations can also be received in this area.

Frequency	Station	Format	Location (transmitter)	Licensed kW	Airdate	Previous station on frequency.
88.3 FM	Hokonui	LPFM	Balclutha	0.001		Radio Clutha
88.3 FM	Rhema	LPFM Christian radio	Clinton	0.001		
88.9 FM	Sanctuary	Christian radio	Balclutha (Mount Stuart)	1.6	14 February 2025	Until 14 February 2025: Star rebranded
91.3 FM	Hokonui	Adult contemporary music	Balclutha (Mount Stuart)	1.6		Radio Clutha
92.1 FM	Life FM	Contemporary Christian music	Balclutha (Mount Stuart)	1.6		
92.9 FM	More FM	Adult contemporary music	Balclutha (Radio Otago)	0.16	1992	Big River Radio
93.7 FM	More FM	Adult contemporary music	Balclutha (Kuriwao)	1.6		Big River Radio
96.1 FM	Rhema	Christian radio	Balclutha (Mount Stuart)	1.6		
104.9 FM	Brian FM	Adult hits	Balclutha (Mount Stuart)	1.6		

== Central Otago ==
The following stations can be heard in the Central Otago area and Queenstown.

=== Queenstown ===
Frequency	Station	Format	Location (transmitter)	Licensed kW	Airdate	Previous station on frequency
88.1 FM	The Studio FM	Underground music LPFM	Peninsula Hill	0.001		
88.4 FM	The Zone FM	Alternative rock LPFM	Peninsula Hill	0.001		
88.8 FM	ZM	Contemporary hit radio	Peninsula Hill	1.25		
89.6 FM	Newstalk ZB	Talk radio	Peninsula Hill	0.8		
90.4 FM	The Hits Southern Lakes (formerly Classic Hits)	Adult contemporary music	Peninsula Hill	0.8	2005	1996 – 2005: Next FM, Ice FM
91.2 FM	Channel X	Classic alternative	Peninsula Hill	0.8	8 May 2023	2005–2019: Radio Live; 2019 – 20 March 2022: Magic Talk; 21 March 2022 – 30 March 2023: Today FM
92.0 FM	More FM	Adult contemporary music	Peninsula Hill	2	2009	1990s – 2006: Q92FM; 2006 – 2009: Q92 The Breeze (The Breeze and More FM swapped frequencies)
92.8 FM	More FM	Adult contemporary music	Greengates	0.63		
93.6 FM	Sport Nation	Sports radio	Peninsula Hill	0.8	19 November 2024	Until 2020: TAB Trackside; 2021 – 2024:SENZ
94.4 FM	Radio Rhema	Christian radio	Peninsula Hill	0.8		
95.2 FM	The Edge	Contemporary hit radio	Peninsula Hill	0.8	2000	
96.0 FM	Brian FM	Adult hits	Peninsula Hill	0.8	16 April 2025	Ice FM, Next FM, 2020 – April 2025: Radio Central
96.8 FM	George FM	Dance music	Peninsula Hill	0.63		
97.6 FM	The Sound (formerly Solid Gold)	Classic rock	Peninsula Hill	0.8	2000	
98.4 FM	RNZ Concert (formerly Concert FM)	Classical music	Peninsula Hill	1.25		
99.2 FM	The Breeze	Easy listening	Peninsula Hill	1.25	2009	1990s – 2004: Resort Radio; 2004 – 2009: More FM (The Breeze and More FM swapped frequencies)
100.0 FM	The Rock	Active rock	Peninsula Hill	1.25	2000	
101.6 FM	RNZ National (formerly National Radio)	Public broadcasting	Peninsula Hill	0.8	2004	
104.0 FM	Breeze Classic	1970s	Peninsula Hill	1.25	1 November 2025	until 31 October 2025: Magic
107.0 FM	Sanctuary	Christian radio LPFM	Queenstown	0.001	14 February 2025	Until 14 February 2025: Star rebranded
1134 AM	ceased April 2019	Public broadcasting	Kelvin Heights			1970s–2019: RNZ National (formerly National Radio), 4ZB

=== Alexandra, Cromwell, and Clutha Valley ===
Frequency	Station	Format	Location (transmitter)	Licensed kW	Airdate	Previous station on frequency
87.6 FM	Sanctuary	Christian radio LPFM	Cromwell Kawarau Gorge Rd	0.001	14 February 2025	Until 14 February 2025: Star rebranded
88.0 FM	Radio Central	Community radio	Millers Flat	0.001	2019	
88.0 FM	Classic Gold	LPFM	Clyde	0.001	2019	
88.7 FM	The Edge	Contemporary hit radio	Alexandra (Obelisk)	1.6		
89.5 FM	Radio Rhema	Christian radio	Cromwell (Kawarau Gorge Rd)	0.1		
90.3 FM	More FM (formerly Radio Central)	Adult contemporary music	Alexandra (Obelisk)	2.5	1995	
91.1 FM	Life FM	Contemporary Christian music	Cromwell (Kawarau Gorge Rd)	0.008		
91.9 FM	Radio Central	Community radio	Alexandra (Cromwell Gorge)	0.8	2018	Local Radio Central 2015–2018; Blue Skies FM 2001–2005; Ice FM 1996–2001
91.9 FM	Radio Central	Community radio	Cromwell (Kawarau Gorge Rd)	0.1	2018	Local Radio Central 2015–2018
92.7 FM	Radio Rhema	Christian radio	Alexandra (Cromwell Gorge)	1.6		
93.5 FM	The Sound	Classic rock	Alexandra (Obelisk)	0.5		
94.3 FM	More FM	Adult contemporary music	Cromwell (Kawarau Gorge Rd)	0.1	1980s	
94.3 FM	Radio Central	Community radio	Teviot Valley	0.3	2018	TVFM
95.1 FM	Newstalk ZB	Talk radio	Alexandra (Obelisk)	1.6		
95.9 FM	Breeze Classic	1970s	Alexandra (Obelisk)	0.5	1 November 2025	Radio Live; 2019 – 20 March 2022: Magic Talk; 21 March 2022 – 30 March 2023: Today FM; 11 April 2023 – 31 October 2025: Magic
96.7 FM	The Breeze	Easy listening	Alexandra (Obelisk)	1.6		Q92FM 1990s–2005 Blue Skies FM 2005–2008
97.5 FM	RNZ Concert (formerly Concert FM)	Classical music	Alexandra (Obelisk)	1.6	1990	
98.3 FM	The Rock	Active rock	Alexandra (Obelisk)	0.63	2008	2004–2008: The Edge
99.1 FM	Radio Wanaka	Adult contemporary music	Cromwell (Barry Ave)	0.05		
99.9 FM	The Hits Southern Lakes	Adult contemporary music	Alexandra (Obelisk)	1.6	2005	1996–2001 Ice FM; 2001–2005 Blue Skies FM
100.7 FM	Sanctuary	Christian radio	Alexandra (Cromwell Gorge)	1.6	14 February 2025	Until 14 February 2025: Star rebranded
101.5 FM	RNZ National	Public radio	Alexandra (Obelisk)	0.63		
103.9 FM	Life FM	Contemporary Christian music	Alexandra (Cromwell Gorge)	1.6		
104.7 FM	Sport Nation	Sports radio	Alexandra (Obelisk)	0.5	19 November 2024	Until 2020: TAB Trackside; 2021–2024: SENZ
105.5 FM	Brian FM	Adult hits	Alexandra (Cromwell Gorge)	1.6		
105.5 FM	Brian FM	Adult hits	Cromwell (Kawarau Gorge Rd)	0.1		
106.7 FM	XS80s	1980s music LPFM	Alexandra	0.001	2017	
107.3 FM	ceased 2023	LPFM	Alexandra	0.001		2023: Classic Gold
531 AM	ceased		Springvale			More FM ceased during last quarter 2022
639 AM	ceased April 2019		Springvale		1970s	1970s–2019: RNZ National (formerly National Radio), 4ZB

=== Wānaka and Hāwea ===
Frequency	Station	Format	Location (transmitter)	Licensed kW	Airdate	Previous station on frequency
87.6 FM	Sanctuary	Christian radio LPFM	Wānaka	0.001	14 February 2025	Until 14 February 2025: Star rebranded
89.0 FM	Rhema	Christian radio	Hillend	0.5		
89.8 FM	The Rock	Active rock	Mt Maude	0.5		
90.6 FM	Newstalk ZB	Talk radio	Mt Maude	0.5		
91.4 FM	Brian FM	Adult contemporary/Classic rock	Hillend	0.5	March 2020	
92.2 FM	Radio Wanaka	Adult contemporary	Hillend	0.5		
93.0 FM	Vacant		Mt Maude	0.25		Bayrock
93.8 FM	The Sound	Classic rock	Mt Maude	0.5		
94.6 FM	Coast	Easy listening	Hillend	0.5		Roy FM
95.4 FM	RNZ Concert	Classical music	Mt Maude	0.5		
96.2 FM	The Hits Southern Lakes	Adult contemporary music	Mt Maude	0.5	1990s	2003 The Fusion 96.2FM
97.0 FM	Radio Hauraki	Active rock/Alternative	Hillend	0.5	9 May 2022	Radio Wanaka, Wanaka Rox
97.8 FM	The Breeze	Easy listening	Mt Maude	0.5		
98.6 FM	The Edge	Contemporary hit radio	Mt Maude	0.5		
99.4 FM	More FM	Adult contemporary music	Mt Maude	0.5		
100.2 FM	ZM	Contemporary hit radio	Mt Maude	0.5		
101.0 FM	RNZ National	Public radio	Mt Maude	0.8		
103.4 FM	XS80s	1980s music	Aubrey Rd	0.1	2016	
104.2 FM	iHeartCountry New Zealand	Country music	Hillend	0.5	9 May 2025	Roy FM, Gold
105.0 FM	Life FM	Contemporary Christian music	Hillend	0.5		
106.8 FM	Sport Nation	Sports radio	Wānaka	0.001	19 November 2024	TAB Trackside until 12 April 2020, SENZ
107.3 FM	Base FM	Underground music LPFM	Wānaka	0.001		

=== Maniototo and Waitaki Valley ===
Frequency	Station	Format	Location (transmitter)	Licensed kW	Airdate	Previous station on frequency
89.5 FM	The Hawk FM		Omakau (Racecourse Road)	0.1	2020	
92.3 FM	Burn	Community radio	North Rough Ridge	0.63	Feb 2025	
97.1 FM	More FM	Adult contemporary music	Little Mt Ida	0.63	Nov 2022	
104.3 FM	Radio Central	Community radio	North Rough Ridge	0.63	Apr 2025	2015–2018 The Hawk FM 2018–2022 Radio Central 2022 – Apr 2025 Vacant
729 AM	Burn	Community radio	Ranfurly AMBC	0.3		
