= Radio Dunedin =

New Zealand radio station

Coordinates: 45.8856°S 170.595°E

Radio Dunedin (4XD) is a radio station, broadcasting from Dunedin, New Zealand on 1305 AM, in the central city and Mosgiel on 106.7 FM, and online. The station was launched in October 1922, by the Otago Radio Association, becoming the first radio station in New Zealand. The station is aimed primarily at the 30+ age bracket, with a community focus, and playing a variety of music from the 1970s to today.

== History ==
The Otago Radio Association first went to air on 4 October 1922, and celebrated 100 years of broadcasting in 2022. The station has had a number of call signs over the years including DN, 4AB, 4ZB (not to be confused with the government-owned station of the same name), Pioneer Radio, and for from 1948 until the 1980s as 4XD. Between 1922 and 1990, 4XD was operated by the Otago Radio Association as a non-commercial and voluntarily-run radio station. In 1990, Radio Dunedin was set up as a commercial station, and in 1993 was purchased by Radio Otago Limited which also operated 4XO.

In 1996, Radio Dunedin moved to the Radio Otago House in Cumberland Street. In 1997, the station began simulcasting on 90.2 in FM Stereo briefly. 90.2 FM became Lite FM and later Solid Gold. On 6 May 2008, Radio Dunedin resumed broadcasting in FM Stereo, following test signals in mid-April 2008.

In 2015, MediaWorks New Zealand decided to use 99.8 FM for its new nationwide network station Magic. On 20 April 2015, Radio Dunedin shifted to a low-power FM frequency of 107.7, which later changed to 106.7, with a range limited to the central city area.

On 14 March 2016, Radio Dunedin commenced broadcasting to Mosgiel and surrounding areas in FM stereo on 95.4. This frequency was previously a relay of 97.4 More FM, and formerly Mosgiel FM and 4XO in the 1990s. 95.4 FM was originally broadcast from Chain Hill (above Wingatui) but was later moved to Saddle Hill.

In 2017, a feature-length documentary film of the same name was produced. Radio Dunedin, the film was directed by Grant Findlay, and followed the history of the station which has faced many challenges over its years including arson attempts, Government takeovers, lack of funds and numerous technical issues.

Between October 2021 to January 2025, The Breeze's "Dunedin's breakfast" show, with Damian & Hannah, was simulcast on Radio Dunedin. This come about when Owen Rooney departed after 16 years of hosting the popular breakfast show. Until January 2025 Radio Dunedin was part of MediaWorks Radio, which operates several other stations including The Breeze (New Zealand radio station).

MediaWorks owns 95.4 FM and they decided to change this to The Breeze. This came into effect on 30 January 2025.

On 3 October 2025, a low-power FM frequency of 106.7 commenced broadcasting from a new transmission site on Saddle Hill to provide coverage to Mosgiel, Outram, and the Taieri Plains.

The partnership with Radio Aotearoa commenced on Monday 3 February 2025. Radio Dunedin started broadcasting from new premises in Princes Street on Friday 25 April 2025. Radio Aotearoa is owned by George Ngatai formally from Invercargill and wife Raewyn Bhana. They own Aotearoa Media a group of Radio Stations broadcasting from Auckland, Northland, Tauranga, Napier and Christchurch. Aotearoa Media are known to bringing back nostalgic radio stations such as Radio Pacific, BOP Radio, Hawkes Bay Radio, Radio Windy and Radio Avon.

Slogans over the years have included "one of a kind", "easy listening", "easy listening hits", "hits and memories", and (since June 2011) "Good Talk, Good Music".

== Programming ==
Radio Dunedin 4XD now broadcasts from its new premises, supported by its Parent Company Radio Aotearoa, at Rodger's House, 151 Princess Street Dunedin.

Previously it was broadcast locally from ASB House from 1997 to 2025 (the building was known as "Radio Otago House" from 1996 to 2014), Tennyson Street, Maclaggan Street, and in the city's southern suburb of St Kilda.

Noted presenters and on-air announcers have included "Toots" Mitchell, Colin Lehmann, Neil Collins, Owen Rooney and Gary Hoogvliet.

In partnership with Radio Aotearoa, Radio Dunedin broadcasts Tony Amos' "Big Breakfast" between 6am and 9am on weekdays, Kevin O’Keefe between 9am and 12pm, Barbara Hamilton between 12pm to 4pm on weekdays, and George Ngatai Drive from 4pm to 7pm weekdays.

Outside of these hours, Radio Dunedin's programmes are presented by local volunteer announcers from the Otago Radio Association at its studios in Princes Street, Dunedin.

== Broadcasting ==
Radio Dunedin 4XD can be heard on either 1305 AM, 106.7 FM in Mosgiel and the central city, or digitally online. The station introduced live streaming on the internet in 2007 and is also available on Mediaworks' Rova mobile app.

Radio Dunedin has broadcast to the greater Dunedin area (receivable in coastal Otago from Oamaru to Balclutha) on 1431 AM and 1305 AM, the latter of which it still uses.

== Florida's "Radio Dunedin" ==
There was another Radio Dunedin, a one-hour show heard on WTAN-AM 1340 in Dunedin, FL (USA). This show and station were not affiliated with the New Zealand station.

== Bibliography ==
- Sullivan, Jim (2022). On Air For 100 Years: The Otago Radio Association, 1922-2022. Dunedin: Otago Radio Association. ISBN 9780473638009.
