= Fifeshire FM =

Radio station in Nelson, New Zealand

Coordinates: 41.298°S 173.278°E

Fifeshire FM was a radio station in Nelson, New Zealand, owned by RadioWorks. The station broadcast on 93.0FM in Nelson, 92.0FM in Motueka and Tākaka, and 94.1FM in Murchison.

== History ==
Fifeshire FM first started as a summer station known as Radio Fifeshire operating for just four weeks during January 1983 and broadcasting on 855AM. A year later Radio Fifeshire returned this time broadcasting for 46 days during December 1983 and January 1984 on 990AM. News on the hour came from Radio Avon in Christchurch. For the next 4 summers Radio Fifeshire returned to the Nelson airwaves still broadcasting on 990AM.

At midnight on Thursday 28 January 1988, Fifeshire 93FM became New Zealand's 8th private FM radio station to begin broadcasting when Fifeshire began broadcasting permanently on FM in the Nelson region - rewarding the efforts of Fifeshire founders Kevin Ihaia and Digby Lawley. The first song that was played - as with all the previous AM broadcasts - was the Rolling Stones' "Start Me Up".

To promote the launch to FM, Radio Fifeshire had organised Nelson's biggest outdoor concert. Australian bands Icehouse and Boom Crash Opera along with Nelson-born Sharon O’Neill performed in front of a crowd of 9000 people at Trafalgar Park.

Fifeshire's signal was extended to Murchison in early 1992 on 94.1FM, and then to Golden Bay later that year first on 98.4FM, which was later adjusted to 92.0FM. Also in 1992 Fifeshire networked with Sounds FM in Blenheim providing a local show in both centres. This network was referred to as "Over The Top 93FM" - referring to both station's locations at the top of the South Island. This networking ceased in 1993.

Also in 1993 a second station was started as Fifeshire Classic 99FM; similar to Solid Gold, this station played music from the 50s, 60s and 70s and broadcast on 98.6FM and later the 990AM frequency was also used for Fireshire Classic.

In 1998 Fifeshire FM Ltd was sold to Radio Otago and then in 1999 Radio Otago was sold to RadioWorks. Fifeshire FM then became part of RadioWorks collection of local station known as LocalWorks. When RadioWorks took over the station, Fifeshire Classic 99FM was shut down and replaced with Solid Gold on the 98.6FM frequency and at the same time the 990AM frequency was used for Fifeshire FM. The 990AM frequency was used during the early 2000s for talkback programmes. After falling out with the new owners from Radio Otago, station co-founder Kevin Ihaia left in 1998 and started another Nelson station, The Planet 97FM.

In December 2004 Fifeshire FM was rebranded as More FM when RadioWorks rebranded the majority of their local stations as either More FM or The Breeze.

The station was a live and local station 24 hours a day however following the rebranding to More FM evenings from 7pm and overnight to 6am is now a network programme based from the More FM studios in Auckland, afternoons from 2pm at weekends are also Auckland based. In 2007 the local breakfast show was also replaced with the Christchurch More FM breakfast show, leaving only the morning show (with Blair Kiddey and later Josh Fogden) local. Fogden eventually left and Kiddey was moved to The Breeze in Nelson to present a local breakfast show.

In 2008 the 990AM frequency was used to broadcast BSport into the Nelson region.

In 2010, the Nelson frequency was adjusted from 93.0FM to 92.8FM. This change was done as part of a Government programme to align the spacing of FM frequencies in New Zealand to meet international standards.
