= Kohinurākau =

Mountain in the Kohinurākau Range

Kohinurākau or Kōhinerākau
- Mount Erin
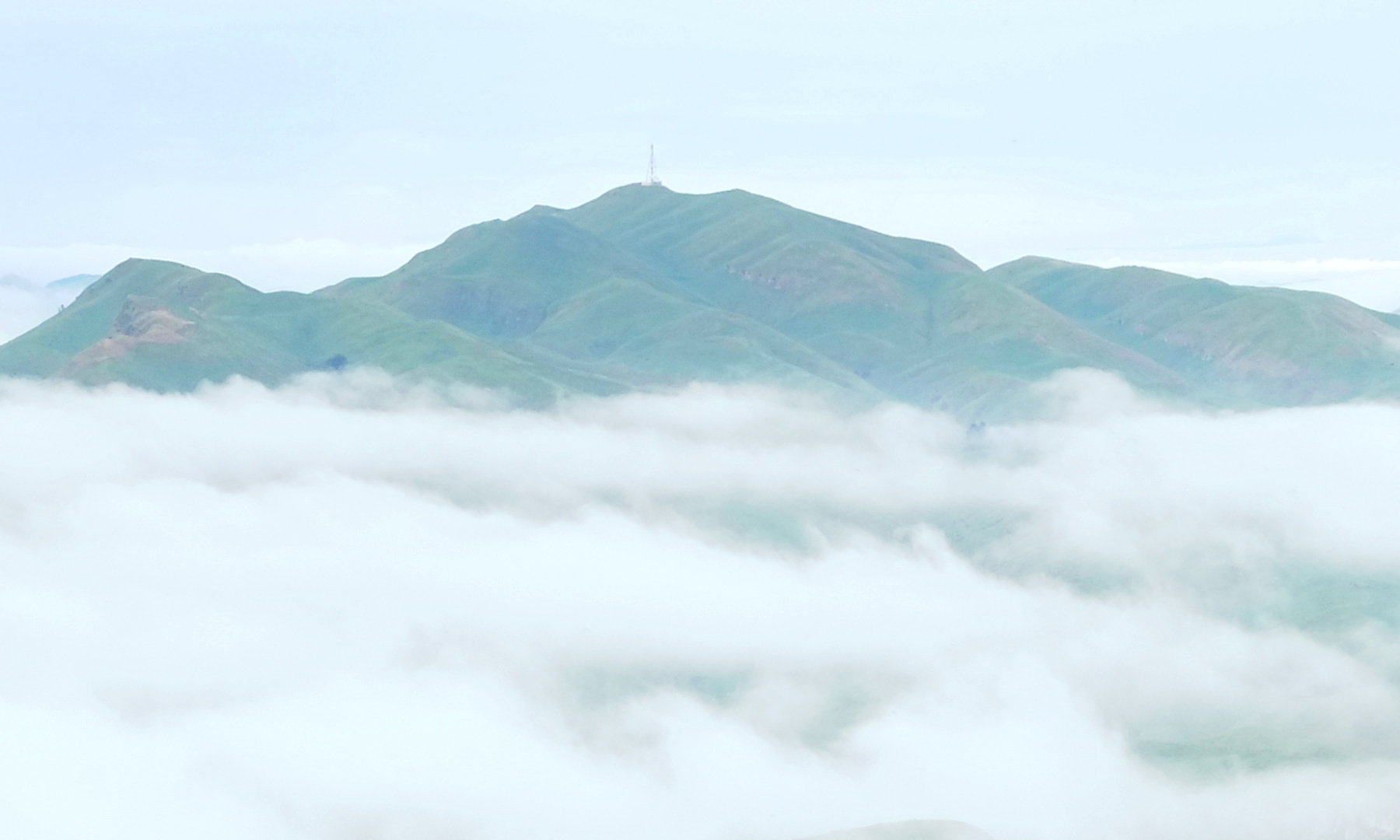
- Kohinurākau viewed from Te Mata Peak

Highest point
- Elevation: 490 m (1,610 ft)
- Coordinates: 39°44′23″S 176°50′28″E

Geography
- Location within New Zealand
- Location: Hawke's Bay, New Zealand
- Parent range: Kohinurākau Range

Kohinurākau or Kōhinerākau (widely known as Mount Erin) is a 490 m (1,610 ft) mountain in the Kohinurākau Range, 8.5 km (5.3 mi) south-southwest of Havelock North in the Hawke's Bay region of New Zealand. The mountain is the main television and FM radio transmitter site for Napier, Hastings and the wider Hawke's Bay region.

== Etymology ==
The names Kohinurākau and Kōhinerākau were officially gazetted in August 2018 as part of the Treaty of Waitangi settlement with Heretaunga Tamatea. The previous name, Mount Erin, is now unofficial but is still used to refer to the transmitter site.

== Transmitter ==
The Mount Erin television transmitter was commissioned in 1966, broadcasting Wellington's WNTV1 channel. Television arrived in the Hawke's Bay in 1963 with a private translator atop Kahurānaki, 6 km (3.7 mi) south-southeast of Kohinurākau. The New Zealand Broadcasting Corporation (NZBC) took over a temporary transmitter atop Te Mata Peak in 1965 prior to the commissioning of the Mount Erin transmitter.

=== Transmission frequencies ===
The following table contains television and radio frequencies currently operating at Mount Erin:

TV Channel	Transmit Channel	Transmit Frequency	Band	Licensed power (kW)
World TV digital	29	538.00 MHz	UHF	10
Sky digital	31	554.00 MHz	UHF	10
Discovery NZ digital	33	570.00 MHz	UHF	10
TVNZ digital	35	586.00 MHz	UHF	10
Kordia digital	37	602.00 MHz	UHF	10
Maori Television digital	39	618.00 MHz	UHF	10
Radio Station	Transmit Channel	Transmit Frequency	Band	Licensed power (kW)
More FM		88.7 MHz	VHF	4
RNZ Concert		91.1 MHz	VHF	4
The Sound		91.9 MHz	VHF	4
Magic		92.7 MHz	VHF	4
The Rock		95.1 MHz	VHF	5
ZM		95.9 MHz	VHF	4
Radio Hauraki		96.7 MHz	VHF	5
The Breeze		97.5 MHz	VHF	2.5
The Edge		98.3 MHz	VHF	5
RNZ National		101.5 MHz	VHF	2.5
Mai FM		105.5 MHz	VHF	4
Today FM		106.3 MHz	VHF	4

==== Former analogue television frequencies ====
The following frequencies were used until 30 September 2012, when Mount Erin switched off analogue broadcasts (see Digital changeover dates in New Zealand).

TV Channel	Transmit Channel	Transmit Frequency	Band	Licensed power (kW)
TV One	6	189.25 MHz	VHF	63
TV2	8	203.25 MHz	VHF	63
TV3	10	217.25 MHz	VHF	50
Māori Television	45	663.25 MHz	UHF	50
Prime	61	791.25 MHz	UHF	50
