= Mix (radio station) =

New Zealand radio station (1970–2020)

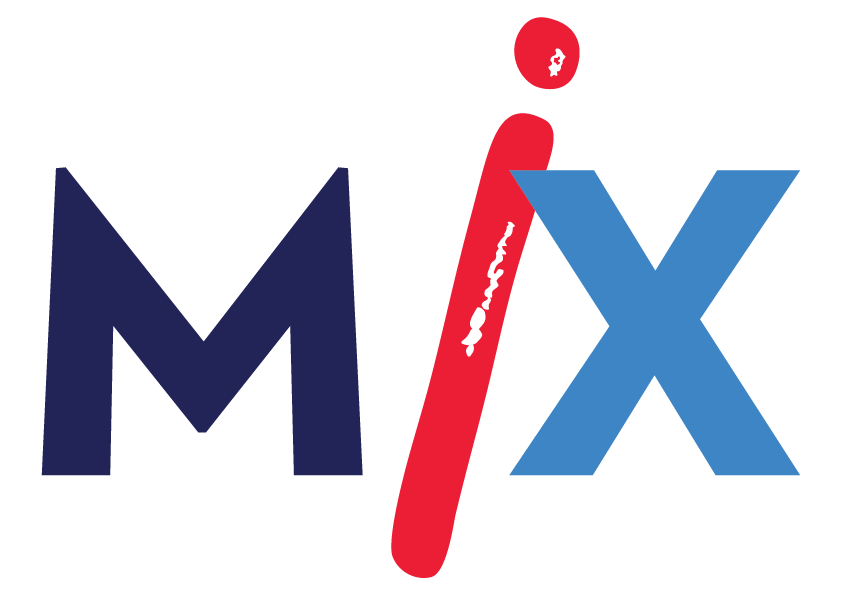
- New Zealand
- Broadcast area: New Zealand
- Frequencies: Christchurch 91.7FM; Gisborne 106.1FM; Greymouth 91.5/97.1FM; Nelson 104.0FM; Tauranga 99.0FM; Wellington 93.7FM; Whangarei 89.2FM
- Branding: "All the Greatest Hits"

Programming
- Format: 70s, 80s and 90s

Ownership
- Owner: NZME Radio

History
- First air date: 1970; 56 years ago

Links
- Webcast: Livestream on iHeartRadio
- Website: Official website Corporate website

Mix was a greatest hits radio station in New Zealand, broadcasting music from the 70s, 80s and 90s. Mix was owned and operated by New Zealand Media and Entertainment and was targeted at 35 to 54-year-olds. Its head office and studios were located in central Auckland, alongside New Zealand Media and Entertainment's seven other radio networks. In September 2020, Mix was replaced with Gold (see below).

Mix had just one presenter; Breffni O'Rourke presented a show based in Nelson. Melanie Homer and later Tracey Donaldson also presented a nationwide breakfast show based out of Auckland. Mix played a variety of music from acts such as Madonna, Prince, Bruce Springsteen, Bryan Adams, Bon Jovi, Crowded House, Queen, Talking Heads and Tom Petty.

== History ==
=== Radio i ===
Radio i logo 1986-1992

The history of Mix dates to the 1960s when a company called Radio International started Radio i in Auckland. The station originally started leasing air time on 1ZM, as the New Zealand Broadcasting Corporation had a monopoly on the New Zealand airwaves preventing private broadcasters from operating.

Radio i was granted a broadcasting licence in 1970, the same year Radio Hauraki was granted the very first private commercial licence in New Zealand. It originally broadcast on 1590AM in the Auckland region, but moved to 1330AM in 1978, and then to 1332AM on 23 November 1978 with the switch to 9 kHz spacing. When the station switched to FM in 1990 the name was changed to Radio i92FM broadcasting on 91.8FM. After 3 months on the air on 91.8FM the station moved to its current frequency on 98.2FM and became Radio i98FM. Peter Sinclair was among the station's hosts.

=== Easy Listening i ===
Easy Listening i logo 1992-2005

Radio i became Easy Listening i in 1992 to reflect the station's easy listening format. It won best station promotion at the 1992 New Zealand Radio Awards, for a "jumbo challenge" campaign that featured Mike Farmer, Bill Mudgeway, Warwick Rees, Kate Rigg and Alice Worsley. The following year, breakfast hosts Geoff Rooke and Kerry Smith won Air Personality of the Year for the Easy Listening Wake-up. The station was also a finalist for metropolitan station of the year, giving recognition to other hosts like Bob Leahy, Breakfast co host Geoff Rooke, Ed Taylor and John Taylor. In 1995, breakfast hosts Geoff Rooke and Andrea McLay were finalists for Air Personality of the Year.

Easy Listening underwent several changes of ownership in the 1990s. A Hamilton station, Easy Listening 97FM, was rebranded as Easy Listening i97FM in 1993 and adopted an identical format. In 1995, it began simulcasting the Auckland station's programmes. In 1996 Easy Listening i was sold to The Radio Network, and Hamilton's station went back to local programming. In 1999 Easy Listening was dropped from the Waikato market and Newstalk ZB took over the frequency.

The network won Best Music Feature and a special commendation at the 2004 New Zealand Radio Awards, for a tribute documentary to Bee Gees musician Maurice Gibb broadcast the morning after his death. Produced overnight by Tim Roxborogh, Andrew Turling and John Budge, the documentary was based on Roxborogh's interview with Maurice Gibb and his previous interviews with band members. At the 2004 and 2005 awards Easy Mix was also recognised for promotional trailers, programming and promotion. Figures from the Radio Broadcasting Association also showed Easy Listening i broadcast more New Zealand music in 2004 than any other easy listening station, including The Breeze.

=== Viva ===
Viva logo 2005-2007

The Easy Listening network was rebranded as Viva FM in 2005. Viva was geared towards women, and the first New Zealand radio network to actively target women. Viva's target listener a 30 to 54 year old professional who was confident, self-aware and a regular cafe visitor. The station was launched with a party at SkyCity Auckland featuring performer Greg Johnson and guests Keisha Castle-Hughes, Ali Mau, April Bruce and Danny Morrison.

The station combined easy listening music with inspirational talk to "strengthen listeners' emotional connection to the station" and expand the listener base. Dean Young and Raylene Ramsay hosted the Viva breakfast show, and Simon Dallow hosted the station's talk and music morning show. The John Tesh Radio Show broadcast on weekday afternoons, Tim Roxborogh hosted the drive show, and singer-presenter Gael Ludlow presented the Lovesongs 'til Midnight night show.

=== Easy Mix ===
Viva was rebranded Easy Mix in August 2007 and continued on-air across Auckland, Tauranga, Rotorua and Hawke's Bay. Consumer research had shown the brand was confused with a paper towel product and a New Zealand Herald supplement with the same name, and rival station The Breeze had outrated Viva in its first year in the Auckland market. The Radio Network made the unusual step of relaunching the network just before a ratings survey, using promotional activity to "soft launch" the new brand. The network returned to broadcasting a separate Auckland and network programme from the same studio to allow hosts to discuss more local Auckland issues. However, it was also criticised for being one of several foreign-owned Auckland-based radio networks with no local content. Easy Mix began broadcasting its networked programme in Wellington on 93.5FM in 2008.

The national line-up for Easy Mix regularly changed. The breakfast featured combinations of Alf Rose, Raylene Ramsay, Tim Roxborogh and Alison Leonard until a reduction in on-air staff in 2010. Roxborogh was a travel writer for the New Zealand Herald, and Leonard was a judge on Dancing with the Stars New Zealand. Leonard hosted the show in 2010 and 2011, and Lorna Subritzky took over in 2012. Alison Leonard, Rebecca Swaney and Mel Homer served as daytime hosts over the five-year period. Roxborogh, Rose and Greg Prebble had turns at the drive show, and Gael Ludlow, Ramsay and Mark Bramley had turns hosting Love Songs 'til Midnight. The John Tesh Radio Show was moved to weekend afternoons, and overnight and on weekend nights the station was automated.

In 2010, the Advertising Standards Authority upheld a complaint against an advertisement for a Christmas club card broadcast on Easy Mix. The ad featured a childlike voice saying he wouldn't receive a "clip around the ear" and "life won't be a bitch" because his family is part of the scheme. The network said the ad was supposed to be humorous, but the authority ruled it was inappropriate for families listening to Easy Mix during the day.

The network was taken off-air on 22 June 2012. The FM frequencies were taken over by Radio Sport, and some of the playlist was carried over to Classic Hits and Coast. APN News & Media said the loss of Easy Mix revenue and investment in digital media like iHeartRadio pushed down the profit of its New Zealand radio business that year. Commentator John Drinnan said the problems that caused Easy Mix to close stemmed from the decision to rebrand Easy Listening i as Viva in 2005. The New Zealand Herald reported former host Simon Dallow was sad to see it go off-air, and was putting it down to the "changing place of the modern broadcasting environment".

=== Mix ===
In June 2014 the Mix was relaunched on the Auckland 98.2 FM frequency with a new format, playlist, programme line-up and branding. It began as Mix 98.2 and, according to radio survey figures, it had around 29,000 listeners after 12 weeks on air. In 2015 the station extended to Christchurch on 91.7FM and the station was renamed to Mix. In 2016 the station extended to Wellington on 93.7FM, Nelson on 104.0FM and Whangarei on 89.2FM. In 2018 the station extended to Tauranga on 99.0FM, Rotorua on 94.3FM and New Plymouth on 106.0FM. In January 2020, Radio Hauraki replaced Mix on 94.3FM in Rotorua. In June 2020, Coast replaced Mix on 98.2FM in Auckland.

The Mix frequencies were rebranded Gold on 1 July 2020. In Auckland, Gold has replaced Coast (a simulcast of 98.2FM) on 105.4FM. The Mix programme ended on iHeartRadio on 18 September 2020, the last song played on the programme was "Weak in the Presence of Beauty" by Alison Moyet.

== Stations ==
=== Auckland/Network ===
The Mix Network was presenter free throughout the No Repeat Workday. Tracey Donaldson was on air from 9:00am to 2:00pm every weekday between March 2019 and April 2020.

=== Nelson ===
The Nelson breakfast show was presented by Breffni O'Rourke with producer Hayden Rose. The local show ran from 6:00am to 9:00am, with news from the NZME Newsroom heard every twenty minutes.

=== Stations ===
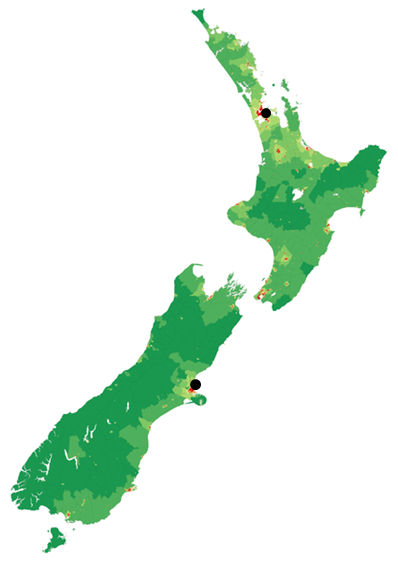
This is a map of Mix stations operating in 2015.

=== Christchurch ===
Easy Listening i broadcast in Christchurch on 94.5FM during the mid-1990s as a completely local station operated by C93FM Limited. It was rebranded as Lite FM in 1998 after C93FM Limited was sold to Radio Otago, and in 2004 was rebranded as The Breeze. Easy Listening i made a return to Christchurch in 2003, broadcasting on 1593AM, and was networked into Dunedin in 2003 on 954AM. Both stations were replaced with Coast in 2004. In 2015 the station returned to Christchurch once again – this time on 91.7FM.

=== Wellington ===
Easy Mix broadcast in Wellington between 2008 and 2012, networked from Auckland on 93.5FM. In 2016 the station returned to Wellington once again – this time on 93.7FM.

=== Nelson ===
In 2016 the station was launched in Nelson on 104.0FM. A local breakfast show hosted by Breffni O’Rourke broadcast weekdays from 6am until 9am.

=== Whangarei ===
In 2016 the station was launched in Whangarei on 89.2FM.

=== Tauranga ===
Easy Listening began broadcasting in Tauranga in 2000 as Easy Listening i99FM with all programming networked from Auckland. It was replaced by Radio Sport in 2012. In 2018 the station returned to Tauranga once again on 99.0FM.

=== Rotorua ===
Easy Listening i launched in Rotorua in late 1996 as Easy Listening i94.3FM and operated as part of a franchise agreement with local Rotorua station Triple X 99FM. The station featured a local breakfast show and networked programmes from Auckland at other times of the day, but closed in 1998. It resumed broadcasting in 2004 as Easy Listening i95.1FM with all programming networked from Auckland, but the frequency was sold on 31 March 2010 and Easy Mix was taken off the air again. The 95.1 FM frequency was sold to MediaWorks and was used to simulcast its talkback radio station, Radio Live. In 2018 the station returned to Rotorua once again on 94.3FM, shifting Radio Hauraki to 87.6FM. In January 2020 this switch was reversed with Radio Hauraki reverting to 94.3FM.

=== Greymouth ===
In 2018 the station was launched in Greymouth on 91.5FM & 97.1FM.

=== Gisborne ===
In 2018 the station was launched in Gisborne on 106.1FM.

== Former stations ==
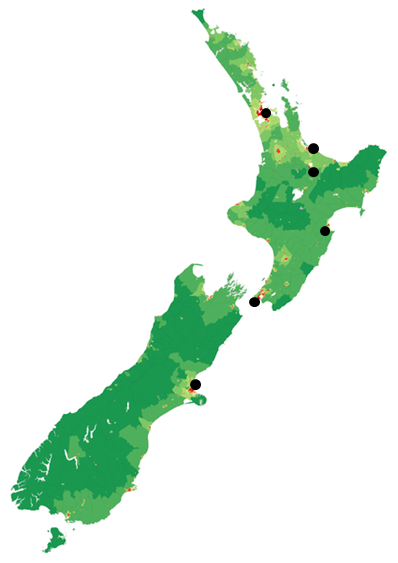
This is a map of Easy Mix stations operating in 2010.

=== Auckland ===
Mix 98.2 and its previous formats have broadcast in Auckland on 98.2 FM since 1990. The station was broadcast from a transmitter on the Sky Tower (Auckland) since 1997 and the frequency was briefly used by Radio Sport between 2012 and 2014. On 1 June 2020, Mix 98.2 was replaced by Coast.

=== Hawke's Bay ===
The first radio station to broadcast on 90.3FM was The Alligator 90FM, which launched in 1994. The station transmitted from Mount Threeve, with studios originally located on Station Street before later relocating to Craven Street in Napier, with an adult contemporary format that had been missing from the market at the time. It used positioning statements like "Better Music Variety and Less Talking", and "The Original FM Music Station for Adults". Its staff and announcers included Graeme Parsonage, Andrew Jefferies, James Milner, Virgil Troy and Julie-Ann Barnes. Mark Bramley joined the station, and later went on to join the Classic Hits network, then host Easy Mix's night show in 2010.

Within months of the station's launch, a second transmitter was installed on Bluff Hill and relayed the programmes to Napier Hill and Port residents on 99.9 FM. The station was renamed The Alligator 90-100FM. The Alligator operated as a fully automated station outside of its Breakfast Show and placed a strong emphasis on workplace listening. This included running song requests for local businesses and delivering morning‑tea shouts, personally dropped off by station personalities - a strategy that helped build strong connections with workplaces across the region. While workplace listeners were a key focus, the station's broader target audience was 30–54 year olds, with a female skew. The playlist leaned heavily into 80s and 90s middle‑of‑the‑road favourites, featuring artists such as Michael Bolton, Hall & Oates, Phil Collins, Celine Dion, and Mariah Carey.

The Alligator, while recognised for its fresh, adult‑friendly playlist, was also criticised by many in the industry for its lack of polish when it came to overall on‑air sound. The station was driven by a DOS based automation system called Digilink. The system stored part of the playlist on its hard drive (typically newer releases), while the station's gold catalogue was played from CDs housed across five 18‑disc changers located at the rear of the studio. However, the system was either incorrectly configured or limited in capability, and was unable to seamlessly segue songs, imaging, and voice‑tracks. This often resulted in noticeable gaps between elements, detracting from the station's flow and on‑air professionalism. Audio processing was handled by a Unity 2000i processor from Cutting Edge.

A few years later, The Alligator encountered financial difficulties, which led to significant staff reductions. As a result, the on‑air product suffered, with recycled and generic voice‑tracking - recorded by both current and former announcers - playing on rotate across all dayparts. In mid-1996 the station renamed to Easy Listening i90 and was sold to Hawke's Bay Media Group, keeping a local breakfast programme but phasing out local programmes at other times of the day. The 99.9 frequency was used to set up a new youth station called Xtreme 100 fronted by Mark McCarron and Rick Toner (Breakfast), with Jason Reeves (Xtreme nights). At the end of 1997 the station reverted to local programmes and changed its name to Easy Listening 90FM. Hawke's Bay Media Group changed its name to Independent Radio, and in 1999 it was renamed again to 90.3 Cool FM.

In 2000 the company was purchased The Radio Network, the station reverted to Easy Listening i90.3FM, and dropped all locally programmes. On 31 May 2011, the station closed down and the frequency switched to Newstalk ZB. On 1 March 2012, Easy Mix was relaunched on 96.7FM replacing Flava. The Radio Network said there was "constant listener and advertiser demand for the station to return." However, the Easy Mix network closed just four months later, and the frequency was taken over by Radio Sport. Mix did return to Hawke's Bay on 1584AM shifting Radio Hauraki to 96.7FM before it closed down.

=== News and information ===
Mix broadcast pre-recorded news, sport and weather updates from the NZME newsroom.

=== Website and social media ===
The Mix website included photo galleries, lifestyle news, entertainment news, humour videos and event listings. The station was available via audio streaming on the iHeartRadio website and app.
