= The Breeze Waikato =

Coordinates: 37.7877°S 175.281°E

New Zealand
- Broadcast area: Hamilton, New Zealand
- Branding: The Breeze

Programming
- Format: Adult Contemporary

Ownership
- Owner: MediaWorks New Zealand

Technical information
- Class: Terrestrial/Internet

Links
- Webcast: Live stream
- Website: thebreeze.co.nz

The Breeze Waikato is an adult contemporary radio station in Hamilton, New Zealand. It is owned by RadioWorks, a MediaWorks New Zealand company. The Breeze plays music from the 1960s to the present day, aimed at a 35- to 54-year-old female audience.

This station was originally Waikato's Y99.3 playing an Adult Contemporary Music Format. The station was changed to an Easy Listening format and relaunched as The Breeze in April 2003, this was the very first station to be rebranded as The Breeze.

Originally all shows on this station were live and local but in April 2007 the local daytime show was replaced with a networked show and in August 2009 all other weekday shows except breakfast were replaced with networked shows. Weekend programming initially remained unaffected with the Waikato station continuing to run local shows from 6am to midnight on Saturday's and Sunday. This local programming was reduced from the end of 2010.

In April 2014 MediaWorks announced a new local breakfast show and a local drive show would launch in 2015.
