= MediaWorks New Zealand =

New Zealand media company

MediaWorks
- Type: Subsidiary
- Industry: Media
- Predecessors: TVWorks (Owner of TV3); RadioWorks
- Founded: June 24, 2004; 22 years ago
- Headquarters: Auckland, New Zealand
- Area served: New Zealand
- Parent: Sports Entertainment Group
- Divisions: Radio (10 brands); Interactive (rova streaming platform)
- Website: mediaworks.co.nz

MediaWorks New Zealand is a New Zealand–based company specialising in mass media, including radio broadcasting, outdoor advertising, and interactive media. It operates ten national radio brands, the online digital audio streaming platform rova and one locally operated radio station. On 1 December 2020, MediaWorks sold its television division, MediaWorks TV to Discovery, Inc. and the subsidiary company, MediaWorks TV Limited was renamed Discovery NZ Limited. Oaktree Capital Management formerly held a 45% stake in Mediaworks. In early April 2025, QMS Media acquired Oaktree's share, taking full control of the company. In October 2026, MediaWorks was acquired by Sports Entertainment Group.

== History ==
=== Television ===
MediaWorks was established on 24 June 2004 following the merger of TVWorks and RadioWorks, and owned the nationwide free-to-air television channels TV3 and C4 through the MediaWorks TV subsidiary.

On 10 March 2016 a Newshub reporter broke embargo and leaked sensitive information about a 25 basis point cut by the Reserve Bank to the Official Cash Rate (OCR). MediaWorks conducted their own investigation of the leak, and followed up with an apology from CEO Mark Weldon (former head of the New Zealand Stock Exchange), although Weldon stopped short of naming the reporters involved. As a result of the loss of trust with the media, the Reserve Bank has elected to discontinue the media lock-up prior to future releases of the OCR.

On 7 September 2020, MediaWorks confirmed that it would be selling its entire television arm including Three, Bravo, The Edge TV, Breeze TV, streaming service ThreeNow, and current affairs service Newshub to Discovery, Inc.. The acquisition of MediaWorks TV by Discovery, Inc. was completed on 1 December 2020.

Following Discovery's acquisition of WarnerMedia in April 2022, Discovery New Zealand and its assets Newshub and channel Three became part of the new Warner Bros. Discovery company. In April 2024, Warner Bros. Discovery confirmed plans to shut down Newshub by early July 2024. Newshub's evening bulletin was replaced by Stuff's ThreeNews service on 6 July 2024. On 1 August 2025, Sky Network Television Limited acquired Warner Bros. Discovery's free-to-air television assets in New Zealand, which were rebranded as Sky Free.

=== Radio ===
MediaWorks Radio has its origins as a Taranaki-based radio company Energy Enterprises. Energy Enterprises was started in the 1980s when local station Energy FM was started in Taranaki. During the 1980s and 1990s Energy Enterprises expanded their operation by starting up new stations around the North Island of New Zealand or taking over existing privately owned stations. In the late 1990s Energy Enterprises amalgamated with Radio Pacific and became known as Pacific/RadioWorks Group. The company purchased seven North Island stations owned by Dunedin-based Radio Otago in 1997 allowing Radio Otago to expand their operations to other markets in the South Island. The two companies Radio Otago and Pacific/RadioWorks group merged in 1999 to become RadioWorks.

The merger of Pacific/RadioWorks Group and Radio Otago allowed RadioWorks to expand their North Island stations into the South Island. By 1999 RadioWorks consisted of The Edge FM and The Rock (two stations that were originally Hamilton-based), Solid Gold, Radio Pacific and a collection of local one-off stations in each market. Some markets even had more than one local station. From 1999 onward, all of the local stations were marketed as LocalWorks stations. Between 2000 and 2001, CanWest purchased RadioWorks, awaiting company restructuring before completing the year-long takeover, and moved its existing More FM group assets, including Channel Z and The Breeze Wellington, into the company.

In 2004 CanWest Global Communications combined television company TVWorks and radio company RadioWorks to form the new MediaWorks company. On 29 July 2004, 30% of this new company was sold on the NZSX. Three years later, in July 2007, CanWest sold its stake of the company to Ironbridge Capital, a group of Australian investors, who subsequently obtained the remaining 30% from other investors.

In 2011 MediaWorks received a $43 million loan guarantee for the Government to renew its licenses until 2030. The deal went against official advice, and then Communications Minister Steven Joyce was accused of having a conflict of interest as the past managing director of the company's RadioWorks division. The loan was described by AUT's Centre for Journalism, Media and Democracy as a form of corporate welfare, and was criticised by blogger Sarah Miles as a case of governmental interference in the media. Among other companies, Radio Bay of Plenty secured commercial loans, The Radio Network covered its own costs, and Rhema Broadcasting Group covered the cost with no-interest loans.

The US-based Oaktree Capital Management bought $125 million of loans to MediaWorks in 2012. These were converted to equity in 2013. In June 2013, with over NZ$700 million in debt, MediaWorks NZ was put into receivership. It came out of receivership in November 2013. Oaktree Capital Management took 100% ownership of the business in 2015.

In August 2014 Mark Weldon was appointed CEO, replacing Susan Turner, who had resigned in July 2014. Weldon resigned in May 2016 at the same time that a large number of long serving and high-profile staff were leaving the company under his leadership. CFO David Chalmers replaced him in an acting capacity.

Since its inception in 2004, MediaWorks has moved its local stations over to More FM and The Breeze network; all these stations now carry the network branding and some or all of the network's programming. At the same time, MediaWorks have rolled out new networks Radio Live and Kiwi FM, converted Radio Pacific to LiveSport, and purchased networks Mai FM and George FM. MediaWorks owns Radio Dunedin in Otago. Previously the company owned and operated Times FM in Orewa and Coromandel FM on the Coromandel Peninsula; these two local stations were rebranded as More FM in 2015.

In October 2021 MediaWorks said it would be ending its content supply agreement with Newshub. MediaWorks announced it would instead establish its own radio newsroom again and would employ over 20 news and sports journalists, editors and correspondents.

In November 2021 MediaWorks announced it would replace Magic Talk with a new talk radio network called Today FM which launched on 21 March 2022. Newshub's political editor at the time, Tova O'Brien, was announced as breakfast host, with broadcasters Duncan Garner, Rachel Smalley, Polly Gillespie, Leah Panapa, Mark Richardson, Lloyd Burr, Wilhelmina Shrimpton, Nigel Yalden, Robett Hollis, Mark Dye, Carly Flynn, Nickson Clark, Dave Letele and Dominic Bowden all named as part of the lineup.

In December 2021 MediaWorks announced it had acquired Humm FM and its existing frequency (106.2 FM).

On 1 January 2022 The Rock moved from 90.2 FM to 106.2 FM in Auckland and was simulcast on both frequencies until the launch of Today FM (on 90.2 FM). In addition to Auckland, Today FM broadcast on FM frequencies nationwide, including the frequency of 95.3 FM in Christchurch (moving Mai FM to 106.8 FM).

On 30 March 2023 Today FM was abruptly taken off the air during Duncan Garner Today and replaced by music. At 5:12 pm that same day, a pre-recorded announcement aired confirming the closure of Today FM. The frequencies of the now-former Today FM were reallocated to different brands.

On 8 May 2023 the frequencies not yet allocated to other brands from Today FM became Channel X, a new music brand that focused on classic alternative music with no interruptions. Music runs 24/7 and there are no news breaks, ads or hosts.

On 22 March 2024 MediaWorks confirmed that a hacker had stolen the personal data of 403,000 individuals who had participated in its online competition.

On 7 April 2025 it was announced that QMS Media had acquired Oaktree Capital Management's 45% share in MediaWorks, taking full ownership of the company. On 30 January 2026, QMS Media was acquired by the Australian media conglomerate Nine Entertainment. MediaWorks was not included in the sale, with terms being agreed in August 2026 to sell the business to Sports Entertainment Group. The transaction was completed in October 2026.

=== Radio Otago ===
Radio Otago was a radio broadcasting company that operated a group of local radio stations in radio markets around New Zealand from the 1970s to the late 1990s. Radio Otago was started in 1971 when Dunedin station 4XO was started, 4XO was originally branded as Radio Otago 4XO. During the 1980s and 1990s Radio Otago expanded their operations by starting up stations around Otago and the rest of New Zealand, and also by purchasing existing stations.

The company sold its seven North Island stations in 1997 to Energy Enterprises and funds from the sale were used to purchase C93 FM Limited allowing Radio Otago to compete in the Christchurch market. In 1999, Energy Enterprises merged with Radio Pacific to become Pacific/RadioWorks Group. Then, Pacific/RadioWorks merged with Radio Otago, forming RadioWorks.

These North Island stations were sold to Energy Enterprises in 1997:

- Classic Rock 92FM, Tauranga
- 90.2 Hot FM, Rotorua: started as a summer station before it became 96FM permanently. This summer station recruited local talent as well as bringing in seasoned veterans from the Hawke's Bay. Many went on to have long careers in local and international radio.
- 93.5 Kis FM Taupo
- 96FM Rotorua
- Classic Gold 1548 Rotorua: closed down and the station was used as a second frequency for Lakes 96FM, and today is used for TAB Trackside (previously known as BSport, then LiveSport).
- Hot 93, Hastings
- 92 More FM, Napier: operated as a franchised station, this station became Hawkes Bay's 92FM and later was replaced with network station Solid Gold, Classic Rock 92FM in Tauranga also was replaced with Solid Gold.
- Star FM, Wanganui

Kis FM, Lakes 96FM, Hot 93 and Star FM were all rebranded as More FM in late 2004/early 2005 when RadioWorks rebranded the majority of their heritage stations as More FM.

Prior to the sale of the company in 1999, Radio Otago operated the following South Island stations:

- Fifeshire FM, Nelson
- Fireshire Classic Nelson – closed down by RadioWorks in 1999 and replaced with Solid Gold.
- Easy Listening i94FM, Christchurch – Rebranded as Lite FM in 1998, and in 2004 rebranded again as The Breeze (see below)
- C93FM: later networked from Christchurch with the Southland station now branded as C93FM despite broadcasting on 90.8FM. Following the merger, C93FM in Dunedin and Invercargill was replaced with network station The Rock, C93FM continued to broadcast in Christchurch but now with a change of format to Adult Contemporary and The Rock launched in Christchurch on a separate frequency. The change of format for C93 was not popular and the station was shut down in 2001 and replaced with Solid Gold.
- Lite FM. Lite FM in Dunedin and Invercargill were replaced with Solid Gold following the merger of Radio Otago and RadioWorks. Lite FM remained in Christchurch and was rebranded as The Breeze in 2004 after RadioWorks rebranded all their easy listening stations as The Breeze.
- 4XO Dunedin
- 93Rox Dunedin – rebranded as C93FM originally separate from the Christchurch station and networked to Invercargill as C91FM.
- Mosgiel FM (Closed down in 1997)
- Radio Dunedin
- Radio Central, Central Otago
- Radio Wanaka: sold to a different operator
- Resort Radio, Queenstown
- Big River Radio, Balclutha – rebranded as a fully networked More FM station in 2018
- Foveaux FM, Southland

4XO, Fifeshire FM, Radio Central, Resort Radio and Foveaux FM were all rebranded as More FM in late 2004/early 2005 after RadioWorks rebranded most of their heritage stations as More FM.

== Nationwide stations ==
Since its inception in 2004, MediaWorks have moved its local stations over to the More FM and The Breeze brand; all these broadcasts now carry this branding and some or all of the brand's programming. At the same time, MediaWorks have rolled out new brands Radio Live and Kiwi FM, converted Radio Pacific to LiveSport, and purchased brands Mai FM and George FM. MediaWorks also owns Radio Dunedin in Otago.

=== Radio brands ===
Brand	Type	Original station
The Breeze	Classic hits	The Breeze Wellington in 1993
The Edge	Pop/top 40	The Edge Hamilton in 1994
George FM	Popular dance music	George FM Auckland in 1998
Mai FM	Popular hip hop & R&B	Mai FM Auckland in 1992
Magic	Oldies	New station
More FM	AC/Pop	More FM Wellington in 1991
The Rock	Rock music	The Rock Hamilton in 1991
The Sound	Classic rock/Oldies	Solid Gold Auckland in 1997
Channel X	90s & 00s throwbacks	New station

=== Defunct/Sold ===
Brand	Type	Original station
LiveSport	Sports talk	Radio Pacific Auckland in 1978 (sold)
Kiwi FM	Alternative music	Channel Z Wellington in 1996 (now defunct)
Today FM	Talk radio	Radio Pacific Auckland in 1978 (now defunct)

=== Local services ===
Coromandel FM was a regional radio network in Coromandel Peninsula with a Hot AC music format and hourly Radio Live News updates. It was officially launched by station manager Warren Male in December 1992, but began as short trial broadcasts on Pauanui-Tairua and Whitianga-Whangamata during previous summers. Under a contract with MediaWorks New Zealand, independent affiliate Coromandel FM Limited also operates The Breeze Mercury Bay and The Rock Mercury Bay from Thames. Coromandel FM is now More FM Coromandel.

==== Local brands and affiliates ====
Brand	Type	Market and location
Radio Dunedin	Oldies	Otago: Dunedin since 1922

===== Former =====
Brand	Type	Market and location	Notes
Big River Radio	Adult contemporary	Otago: Balclutha (1992–2015)	Merged into More FM
Coromandel FM	Hot AC	Coromandel Peninsula: Thames (1992–2018)	Merged into More FM

=== George FM ===
George FM is a dance music radio station. Seventy-five presenters present the station's twenty-four-hour mix of house, breaks, drum and bass, electro, soul, downbeat, jazz, funk, indietronica, hip-hop and other dance and electronica music. The station is targeted at the 25- to 44-year-old age group.

George FM was set up in 1998 as a volunteer-run low-power station based in a Grey Lynn spare bedroom. George FM began broadcasting on a high powered FM frequency in 2001 and became a commercial station with paid staff in 2003. The station was relayed to other centres in later years through the use of low powered frequencies. George FM was available for a while on Sky Digital and since 2007 has broadcast on Freeview. The station was purchased by MediaWorks on 16 February 2009. However, it continues to retain a laid-back style: news is limited to informal Auckland-specific news, weather, traffic and surf reports hourly during breakfast and drive shows and the choice of music and presenting style is entirely that of programme hosts.

George broadcasts on Auckland 96.6 FM and on low powered FM frequencies in other markets around New Zealand. The station was turned into a nationwide brand in 2015 following the purchase of additional frequencies.

=== Mai FM ===
Mai FM is an Auckland-based Māori radio network which plays mainly hip-hop and R&B music. The station is targeted at under 35-year-old listeners. Mai FM was operated as an iwi radio station by Ngati Whatua subsidiary Mai Media Limited between 1992 and 2008, but MediaWorks New Zealand gained ownership and control of the station from 31 March 2008. Today Mai FM can be heard in eleven markets around the North Island and in Christchurch in the South Island.

=== Magic ===
Magic is an oldies music station targeted at the 50- to 69-year-old age group and is currently heard in over 20 markets. The station launched on 20 April 2015. The station launched on frequencies previously used by MediaWorks for other local or network stations.

=== More FM ===
More FM is an adult contemporary music station catering to the 25- to 44-year-old listeners and runs a mixture of local and network shows, programming varies between markets. More FM has its origins as local radio stations broadcasting in Auckland, Hamilton, Wellington, Christchurch and Dunedin – the original station was established in Wellington in May 1991. The More FM brand was expanded across all of New Zealand when local stations operated by MediaWorks as More FM, stations initially remained local between 6 am and 7 pm but local content has been reduced on each station since then. Today, More FM can be heard in 24 markets across New Zealand.

=== The Sound ===
The Sound is a classic rock station playing music targeted at the 35- to 59-year-old age group. The station was originally known as Solid Gold and played a Rock N Roll Oldies format, specialising in music from the 1960 and 70s. Solid began in Auckland in 1997 and expanded across New Zealand in the late 90s. The station was rebranded as The Sound on 1 January 2012 and can now be heard in 25 markets across New Zealand.

=== The Breeze ===
The Breeze is an easy listening music station catering to 40–60-year-old listeners and is targeted mostly at females. The Breeze began in 1993 as an easy listening station in Wellington, there were also local The Breeze stations in Auckland and Hamilton but both stations were closed down and returned some years later. The Breeze in Wellington was originally independently owned and has its origins as Radio Windy which had been on the air since the 1970s.

The Breeze was expanded to other markets after MediaWorks rebranding some of their local easy listening stations as The Breeze, originally retaining local programming. A network was formed in 2007 a year after The Breeze began broadcasting in Auckland with local content reduced on some stations and the brand expanded to new markets. Today, The Breeze can be heard in 18 markets around New Zealand.

=== The Edge ===
The Edge is a pop music station catering to 15–34-year-old female listeners. The station plays music in the current Top 40 as well as some older tracks. The Edge began in 1994 as a local Hamilton radio station taking over from Buzzard 98FM, both stations actually broadcast on 97.8 FM. In 1998 RadioWorks began expanding the station across the North Island and in 1999 following the RadioWorks and Radio Otago merger The Edge was networked into the South Island. In 2001 The Edge was moved to Auckland but did not begin broadcasting there until 2003. Today The Edge is available in 22 markets across New Zealand.

=== The Rock ===
The Rock is a modern rock music station playing rock music from the 1980s to today. The station is aimed at the 25–44-year-old male audience. The Rock has its origins as a local radio station in Hamilton which began broadcasting on 1 December 1991. The Rock expanded into Taranaki and the Bay of Plenty as separate local stations during the mid-nineties and later began networking to regions around the North Island, replacing the local programming in Taranaki and Bay of Plenty with programming from Hamilton. In 1999 The Rock moved to Auckland and with RadioWorks and Radio Otago merging The Rock was able to expand into the South Island. The Rock is currently available in 26 markets across New Zealand.

=== Channel X ===
Channel X is a classic alternative music station playing tracks from the 1990s to 2010s. The station is aimed at 25–56-year-olds (those in generation X and millennials) who may not be regular radio listeners. Channel X began broadcasting at noon on 8 May 2023, broadcasting across 15 markets on the remaining former-Today FM frequencies that were not allocated to other existing brands. The station does not host any shows or DJs, instead they play uninterrupted music 24/7 with witty comments between each song. They do not air any news, talk or have any ad breaks as of yet and mainly focus on playing popular songs from the 1990s and 2000s, as well as classics that don't normally air on commercial stations.

== Past stations ==
=== Networked closed down stations ===
==== Channel Z and Kiwi FM ====
Kiwi FM (originally known as Channel Z) was a New Zealand music station, the station originally played 100% music from New Zealand artists, this was reduced to 60% in 2012. Kiwi FM had its origins as Channel Z, a station that played mostly alternative rock music. Channel Z began as a local station in Wellington and separate stations were later started in Auckland and Christchurch.

In 2001, the Wellington and Christchurch stations became networked from Auckland and Channel Z saw a format change in 2003 to include 30% New Zealand music as well as a change of presenters. In 2005 Channel Z was relaunched as Kiwi FM, a station that originally played 100% New Zealand music. From 2006 Kiwi used frequencies licensed by the New Zealand Government with the original frequencies assigned to other MediaWorks radio stations. Kiwi FM ceased broadcasting on 31 March 2015 with the frequencies handed back to the government.

==== LiveSport ====
LiveSport was a sports talk station aimed at the 40+ year-old male listeners. LiveSport was used to broadcast Radio Trackside during horse racing hours.

=== Today FM ===
Today FM was a talkback radio station catered at the 35–54-year-old audience. The station had its origins as Radio Pacific which was an Auckland radio station that began in the 1970s, switched to a talkback format in the 1980s and was networked across all of New Zealand in the 1990s. In 2005, Radio Live was launched focusing on talkback and the Radio Pacific brand remained until 2007 running talkback at breakfast, but outside of that time, it broadcast Radio Trackside horse racing coverage. At midnight on 19 January 2019, Radio Live was rebranded as Magic Talk. At 5 am on 22 March 2022, Magic Talk was rebranded as Today FM, and was taken off air on 30 March 2023. Today FM was heard in 28 markets across New Zealand.

=== Local closed-down stations ===
The following stations were inherited by MediaWorks Radio as part of a merger and were later closed down or replaced with a networked station:

- Magic FM, Northland – closed 2001 replaced with The Edge
- Fifeshire Classic Nelson – closed 1999 replaced with Solid Gold
- 92FM, Hawke's Bay – originally a MORE FM station, closed 1997 replaced with Solid Gold
- C93FM, Christchurch – closed 2001 replaced with Solid Gold

=== Local rebranded stations ===
The following stations were local stations across New Zealand purchased by MediaWorks Radio either as part of the merger with Radio Otago or as part of the purchase of other independent radio companies. Following the formation of RadioWorks these stations operated under the LocalWorks banner. In December 2004 these stations were either rebranded as MORE FM or The Breeze. Some stations listed were purchased by MediaWorks Radio after 2004 and subsequently rebranded.

==== More FM stations ====
The following stations originally had an adult contemporary music format or Hot AC music format and were rebranded as MORE FM:

- KCC FM Northland
- Times FM Rodney – rebranded 2015
- Coromandel FM – rebranded 2015
- Coastline FM Tauranga
- Lakes 96FM Rotorua
- Energy FM Taranaki
- 89 FM Gisborne – purchased 2005 rebranded same year.
- Hot 93 Hawkes Bay
- Star FM Wanganui
- 2XS FM Manawatu
- Fifeshire FM Nelson
- Sounds FM Marlborough – purchased 2007 rebranded 2008.
- Port FM Timaru- purchased 2018 rebranded same year.
- Radio Central Central Otago
- Resort Radio Queenstown
- 4XO Dunedin
- Big River Radio Balclutha
- Foveaux FM Southland

==== The Breeze stations ====
The following local stations were rebranded as The Breeze. Most stations originally played Easy Listening prior to the rebranding:

- Y99.3 FM Waikato – rebranded 2003
- Magic 828 & 98.6FM Manawatu – rebranded 2004
- Easy FM Marlborough – purchased 2007 rebranded 2008.
- Lite FM Christchurch – rebranded 2004
- Q92 FM Queenstown – purchased 2006 rebranded same year.

== Websites and platforms ==
Logo for the rova app.

MediaWorks New Zealand's online presence consists of its official corporate website and the rova app. In October 2020, MediaWorks partnered with the online travel platform TRAVLR Group to launch an online market place in New Zealand.

=== rova ===
In January 2017, MediaWorks launched a new digital audio streaming platform called rova. The mobile app offers access to Mediaworks' ten entertainment radio stations: The Edge, The Rock, More FM, The Breeze, The Sound, Mai FM, George FM, Radio Live, Magic and Channel X. rova replaced these radio stations' individual websites. In September 2024, MediaWorks relaunched the rova app as an on-demand digital platform combining its ten radio brands. The new app was designed by the innovation and design company, AKQA.

== Former services ==
=== Television ===
Three, Bravo, The Edge TV and Breeze TV operated out of Auckland City. Television advertising was sold by the MediaWorks offices in Auckland, Wellington, Christchurch, Melbourne, Sydney and Hamilton. There were Newshub bureaus in the Three Headquarters in Auckland and MediaWorks offices in Wellington, Christchurch and Dunedin, with news staff working out of other offices as needed. Three provided mature content, Newshub bulletins, current affairs and sport. The Edge TV launched in 2014 and broadcasts music videos and entertainment news. All are available via all digital platforms such as terrestrial, satellite and cable. TV3 (now Three) and Four were the only ones previously available via analogue terrestrial on the VHF band before the 2013 switch-off. The Edge TV was added in 2018. Bravo and Bravo Plus 1 replaced Four and Four Plus 1 in 2016. ThreeLife was added in 2018, and ThreeLife + 1 replaced The Edge TV on terrestrial in 2019. On 25 March 2020, ThreeLife went off air, and was replaced by The Edge TV, and its timeshift channel by The Breeze TV.

==== Television brands ====
Channel	Launched	Channel	Plus 1 channel
Three	1989	3	8 (Sky 503)
Bravo	2016	4 (Sky 12)	9 (Sky 512)
The Edge TV	2014	11 (Sky 118)	—N/a
The Breeze TV	2020	14 (Sky 119)	—N/a

== See also ==
- Freeview
- Sky Free
