= C93FM =

Christchurch; New Zealand
- Broadcast area: Canterbury, New Zealand
- Frequencies: 92.9 FM; 1260 AM

Programming
- Format: Classic rock (until 1999), Adult Contemporary (after 1999)

History
- Last air date: April 2001

Technical information
- Transmitter coordinates: 43°36′12″S 172°38′58″E

C93FM was a New Zealand radio station based in Christchurch.

C93FM broadcast on 92.9 FM and, after it merged with Radio Avon, also broadcast on 1260 AM. C93FM has had several music formats during its time on the air. In 1989 the station was rebranded as 93FM Gold and in 1990 93FM Classic Hits. Then in 1991 the station reverted to C93FM with a new logo and playing classic rock and continued to play classic rock until 1999 when the station was changed to an Adult Contemporary music format.

Originally C93FM was an independent station operated by a company of the same name, C93FM Limited. The company also operated a second station Easy Listening i94.5 until 1997. The Radio Network made two attempts to purchase C93FM Limited, in March and May 1997; both were rejected by the Commerce Commission on the basis that they would give the company a dominant position in the Christchurch radio market. Instead, C93FM and Easy Listening I were sold to Radio Otago. Easy Listening i94 became Lite FM in 1998.

Following the sale of C93FM Limited to Radio Otago, C93FM was started in Dunedin by rebranding local rock station 93Rox as C93FM. The Dunedin-based C93FM was then networked to Invercargill on 90.8FM and was originally branded as C91FM. On air the announcers simply called the station "Classic Rock." Later in 1998 C91FM in Invercargill became known as C93FM.

In 1999 Radio Otago was sold to the Radioworks and in Invercargill and Dunedin C93FM was replaced with network station The Rock. The Rock was also networked into Christchurch at the same time broadcasting on 93.7FM and as a result the format of C93FM was changed to an Adult Contemporary format. Also, the original 1260AM frequency used by C93 was replaced with Solid Gold as there were no other FM frequencies for Solid Gold to broadcast on at the time. The changes made to C93FM were not popular, and the station failed to attract new listeners as a result. C93FM went off the air in April 2001 and the 92.9FM frequency was taken over by Solid Gold, which later became The Sound in 2012, changing back to a classic rock format. Solid Gold also kept the 1260AM frequency until 2005 when it was used by Radio Pacific.

== Sources ==
- Decision No. 294 Commerce Commission, Wellington, New Zealand, 1997.
