= Energy FM =

Energy FM is the brand name of several radio stations:

- Energy FM (Canary Islands)
- Energy FM (Estonia)
- Energy FM (Isle of Man)
- Energy FM (Malta)
- Energy FM (Philippines), a Philippine radio network owned by Ultrasonic Broadcasting System
  - 106.7 Energy FM, one of its stations
- Energy FM (Australia)
- Energy FM (UK)
- NRJ Russia, also known as Energy FM
- Energy FM (New Zealand radio station)

It may also refer to the Énergie radio network in Quebec.
