= Lakes 96FM =

Coordinates: 38.6831°S 176.0669°E

Lakes 96FM was a radio station in Rotorua, in New Zealand's North Island. The station was started in 1988 as Lake City 96FM broadcasting on 95.9FM with the call sign 1HOT. In the early nineties the station became known as Rotorua's 96FM and in 1998 Lakes 96FM. Also in 1998 Lakes 96FM began broadcasting on 1548AM after Classic Gold (another station operated by Lakes 96FM) was closed down. Lakes 96FM was later sold to RadioWorks and became part of RadioWorks group of local stations known as LocalWorks.

On 15 January 2005 Lakes 96FM was rebranded as More FM after RadioWorks rebranded the majority of their local heritage stations as More FM. Prior to this station starting, a summer station was operating as 90.2 Hot FM from a small cramped studio upstairs in Hinemoa Street. This station was on air from 6am through to midnight.
