= Sounds FM =

- Marlborough Region; New Zealand
- Frequencies: 92.9 FM, 94.7 FM, 89.9 FM

Programming
- Format: Adult Contemporary

Ownership
- Owner: MediaWorks NZ

History
- First air date: 16 August 1991

Technical information
- Transmitter coordinates: 41°31′08″S 173°57′20″E

Sounds FM was a radio station in the Marlborough region of New Zealand. Sounds FM had its origins as a school-based radio station, X-Static FM operated by The X-Static Society. The station was based at Marlborough Boys' College and broadcast on 89FM with the callsign 2STA. This station originally went to air in 1986 and only operated on a part-time basis during school lunch times and some evenings. The station was rebranded as Marlborough's 89FM in 1988 and remained at Marlborough Boys College until 1989 when the station moved to new premises at the Blenheim Post Office Building; by this time the station was broadcasting from 6AM to 12AM. In 1990 this station went off the air and The X-Static Society a year later launched a new station Sounds 93FM.

Sounds 93FM began on 16 August 1991 originally from The X-Static Society premises. The station originally broadcast on 92.9FM in Blenheim, and 94.5FM (now 94.7FM) in Picton and to Kaikōura.

In 1992, Sounds 93FM ran a networked show between 22:00-06:00 each day with the programme coming from Fifeshire FM in Nelson creating an "Over The Top" network - Over The Top referring to the top part of the South Island. This arrangement ended in 1993, and Sounds FM resumed their own overnight programming.

The station was later sold to Marlborough Media and the name shortened to Sounds FM. The relay to Kaikōura was dropped in the late 1990s but then re-established in early 2007 on 90.3FM (now 89.9FM). Marlborough Media also operated a second station called Easy FM. In December 2007 Marlborough Media was sold to MediaWorks and in August 2008 Sounds FM was rebranded as More FM.

Programming during the morning was locally produced from the former Sounds FM studios. The breakfast show is networked from More FM Canterbury. From 15:00 onwards, the station is networked from the Auckland More FM studio, like most of the other More FM stations.

The local morning show (from 10:00-15:00) was previously hosted by Georgia Watt. Former host Glen Kirby left the station in 2015, along with Natasha Knox, who returned in 2017 - the latter of which now works in Promotions. Josh Fogden left the station in 2017. There is no local programming on the station today.
