= Tim Roxborogh =

New Zealand media personality

- Born: September 9, 1981 (age 45)
- Presenting career
- Network: Newstalk ZB
- Time slot: 8pm-11pm Sundays
- Country: New Zealand

Tim Roxborogh is a New Zealand media personality, travel-writer and music reviewer. He hosts a Sunday evening programme on Newstalk ZB, and writes for The New Zealand Herald.

== Early life ==
The youngest child of John & Jenny Roxborogh, a Presbyterian minister and English teacher respectively, Tim's parents moved their young family from New Zealand to Malaysia when he was only one and a half years old.

== Career ==
=== Radio ===
Upon returning to New Zealand, while still in high school, Tim's knowledge of the Bee Gees enabled him to win a radio competition through Classic Hits. The prize included a meeting with the Bee Gees backstage on their 1999 tour to New Zealand. This opened the door at the age of 17 for his first on-air role in radio on a twice-weekly segment called 'Beat the Professor' talking music trivia with callers on Peter Sinclair's programme on Classic Hits.

Tim started filling in on the breakfast programme on Easy Listening i at the age of 24 and at 26 years old he landed the breakfast role full-time. Over the course of his subsequent career Tim has gone on to interview numerous top international acts including Fleetwood Mac, Lionel Richie, Sheryl Crow, John Mayer, Burt Bacharach, Russell Crowe, Cliff Richard, Michael Buble, Hall & Oates, and has interviewed Barry Gibb at least seven times.

In 2012 Roxborogh shifted into talk radio being paired with Pam Corkery to create Newstalk ZB's Sunday night talkback programme The Two. When Pam departed Newstalk ZB in 2014 to work for The Internet Party, TVNZ journalist Tim Wilson joined Roxborogh on The Two.

Between 2016 and 2018 Tim also ran a digital soul and R&B radio station ‘Coast Soul’ on iHeartRadio with a 2-hour broadcast show airing Sunday evenings on Coast.

In May 2018 Tim Roxborogh and Tim Wilson were moved to Saturday and Sunday afternoons from 3-6pm on Newstalk ZB, creating the new show The Weekend Collective. At the end of 2019 Tim Wilson moved to anchor Sunday nights with Tim Beveridge replacing him alongside Roxborogh on The Weekend Collective.

Tim moved to hosting Newstalk ZB's Sunday evening talkback show in early 2023.

=== Television ===
In 2021 Tim co-hosted travel series Uncharted New Zealand alongside Carolyn Taylor, which was broadcast on Three between November 2021 and January 2022.

Tim then went on to work for Stripe Studios as Senior Writer & Researcher on the 2023 series Izzy & Beaver's French Connection.

=== Documentary ===
Tim's knowledge of the Bee Gees led him to be nominated by Barry Gibb to become an advisor for the 2020 documentary The Bee Gees: How Can You Mend a Broken Heart. The Documentary went on to be nominated for six Emmy Awards, winning one for Outstanding Sound Editing.

=== Writing ===
Tim's writing on both music and travel has appeared in a range of publications including The New Zealand Herald, New Zealand Woman's Weekly, New Zealand Listener, Let’s Travel, and M2.

== Family life ==
Tim married Aimee Roxborogh in 2017. The couple met in high school and reconnected later in their thirties. They now have two children.
