= Kerry Smith =

New Zealand actor and broadcaster

Kerry Lois Smith (29 March 1953 – 20 April 2011) was a New Zealand actor and broadcaster. Between 1978 and 1989, she co-presented the "Top Marks" breakfast show on 89FM in Auckland. She was a presenter on the radio station The Breeze from 2006 to 2011. She was also a presenter for Radio Pacific and Radio Live. On television, she was known for her role as Magda in the 1980s drama series Gloss. She also worked as a television announcer and weather presenter, and was the host of home improvement show Changing Rooms. Smith died on 20 April 2011 following a battle with melanoma.

== See also ==
- List of New Zealand television personalities
