= 4XO =

Coordinates: 45.87456°S 170.503388°E

Dunedin; New Zealand
- Broadcast area: Otago
- Frequencies: 97.4 MHz; 1206 kHz

Programming
- Format: Adult contemporary

Ownership
- Owner: Canwest

History
- First air date: 20 November 1971
- Former frequencies: 1210 kHz (1971–1978)
- Call sign meaning: 4 for the Otago area; X for a private station; O for Otago

Radio 4XO was a local radio station in Dunedin, New Zealand, which began on 20 November 1971 as one of the first privately owned commercial radio stations in the country. The station was originally known as "Radio Otago 4XO" and was always involved in local events and was one of Dunedin's most well-known and popular stations. Music played was from the 1970s, 1980s, 1990s & 2000s with all announcers and voice overs local.

== History ==
Radio 4XO broadcast first on 1210 AM (shifting to 1206 AM in 1978 when the AM frequencies in New Zealand were adjusted to 9 kHz spacing). In 1989, it was granted a warrant to convert to FM and began a stereo broadcast on 97.4 MHz in 1990. It broadcast throughout the 1970s and 1980s, mainly from studios in Radio House in Lower Stuart Street (central Dunedin). In the mid-90s the station moved to the Radio Otago House Building.

4XO could be heard throughout Otago. During the early '90s, 4XO broadcast a network show at night across other stations in the Radio Otago group, including Radio Central in Alexandra/Cromwell and Resort Radio in Wānaka and Queenstown. In the mid-1990s, Resort Radio changed to networking Foveaux FM in the evenings.

The station's final slogan was "Otago's Music Choice 4XO" & another voice over said "From Oamaru in the North, to Balclutha in the South, this is Otago's Music Choice". The station was closely involved with the website seenindunedin.co.nz which provided 4XO with a website page. However,

During the 1990s, 4XO became 4XO Gold and reverted to playing a "Solid Gold" mix of music. For a number of years, 4XO struggled to maintain a stable, well-rating breakfast show.

In 1994 Radio Otago started a new radio station in Mosgiel called Mosgiel FM. Broadcasting on 95.4 MHz, its purpose was to air 4XO programming with a local breakfast show opt-out for Mosgiel and the Taieri Plains. The local operation was shut down in 1997, with the transmitter used to broadcast 4XO at all times.

Mark Bunting joined the station in 1997, and the format was changed to be that of an adult contemporary station, similar to 98 More FM at the time. This was shortly prior to Radio Otago being sold to RadioWorks. Bunting left after around two years, seemingly frustrated with the management's decision to aim for an older audience to avoid direct competition with 98 More FM.

Eventually, Damian Newell was brought in to host breakfast with Charlotte Butler - "Damian and the Butler". The breakfast show was renamed "The Blue & Gold Brekky Show" when Breffni O'Rourke joined as his co-host with Elvis the Pigeon. The final breakfast team before 4XO became 97.4 More FM was Damian Newell, Breffni O'Rourke and Grant McLean.

=== Conversion to More FM ===
It was publicly announced in November 2004 that RadioWorks was to rebrand 4XO as part of the More FM network. Damian Newell continued to host the More FM breakfast show until April 2015, when he moved to 98.2 The Breeze.

== Frequencies ==
- 97.4 FM Covered most of Otago (Official Frequency). This frequency is today More FM.
- 1206 AM Dunedin Area (Official Frequency) Note - started on 1210 AM and then moved to 1206 kHz in 1978. This frequency now broadcasts SENZ.
- 95.4 FM Unofficial frequency for Mosgiel, used initially by Mosgiel FM.
- 93.7 FM Operated from Balclutha as Big River Radio from 6:00 AM till 12:00 PM, today this is More FM Balclutha.
