= Big River Radio =

Former radio station serving Balclutha, New Zealand

Coordinates: 46.2481°S 169.723°E

Big River Radio was a local radio station in Balclutha, New Zealand broadcasting a local breakfast show. The 92.9 FM frequency covered central Balclutha, while the 93.7 FM frequency could be heard throughout the South Otago and Northern Southland area (including Gore).

The station was first started in 1992 as way of rebroadcasting Dunedin's 4XO to the Balclutha region as the hilly geographic location of the township means Dunedin radio stations can not be picked up clearly in Balclutha.

The station was initially limited to just a local show on Saturday mornings from a client's premises but after a permanent studio was built the station extended local programming to 7am - 12pm weekdays with 4XO relayed outside these times. In 1999 the stations owner Radio Otago was sold to RadioWorks.

In 2002 the station was extended into the afternoon giving it ten hours local content Monday to Friday with a further four hours on Saturday morning. John Tempest was the breakfast announcer with Klara Vajra the afternoon announcer and manager Ian Bacon broadcasting Saturday mornings.

In 2004 RadioWorks rebranded most of its local stations as More FM but Big River Radio was not affected by this change. Since 2009 the station was known on air as More FM's Big River Radio during local programming and played exactly the same songs in the same sequence as the other More FM stations.

All other times the station relayed Dunedin's 97.4 More FM with Dunedin advertising. Previous award-winning breakfast host Brad Jeffrey left the station in November 2010 to take on the role of Operations Manager and 10-2 host at Times FM in Orewa, before returning to the station in November 2013.

As of 2018 the station is now known as More FM Balclutha and contains no local programming. The station is now separate from More FM in Dunedin and runs different network shows to those heard in Dunedin.
