= Media lock-up =

A media lock-up is a security procedure typically associated with politically sensitive disclosures and press conferences. During a media lock-up, accredited journalists receive advance access to information and expert advisers in order to assist with the accuracy of their reporting on matters disclosed. A media lock-up ends when a timed embargo on the release of information is lifted.

== Process ==
Journalists may be required to sign deed polls or other agreements prior to receiving permission to attend media lock-ups. Mobile phones may be required to be turned off and/or left with a security supervisor upon entry. Laptop, Wireless and mobile phone devices must generally be disconnected to prevent any other means of outbound communication until a scheduled embargo is lifted. During a media lock-up, attendees are not permitted to leave the room, and no-one is allowed to approach any internal communications infrastructure. In cases where mobile phones are not required to be surrendered, attendees may be subject to escorts when visiting the bathroom.

== Use ==
Institutions that impose media lock-ups include the Reserve Bank of Australia, the Australian Government, the New Zealand Treasury, the United States Department of Labor, the South African Treasury, the Government of Canada and the Supreme Court of Canada. The Supreme Court of Canada has stated that it uses media lock-ups "to improve the accuracy of media reporting of Supreme Court of Canada decisions and to assist members of the media in reporting on cases that have attracted a high level of public interest."

== Budget lock-up ==
A specific variety of media lock-up, especially found in responsible government jurisdictions, budget lock-ups are designed to expedite coverage of government budgets. They usually involve the surrender of cellular devices, and receiving documents in a location without internet access. While documents may historically only have been distributed in hard copy, it is now sometimes practice to distribute pre-loaded USB memory drives, which saves paper and affords attendees the ability to pre-draft articles using a word processor on a non-cellular device. The level of detail in the budget documents may differ by jurisdiction, for example, in Australia, documents may mainly consist of financial tables, while in Canada the documents may be more narratively driven. Lock-ups may be held centrally by a Ministry of Finance, or by multiple government departments at once.

Unlike usual media lock-ups, attendees may not be limited to media, and may include representatives from stakeholder groups who may have interest in putting out press releases with relation to the budget, and over a thousand people may be present at a lock-up, including government officials. Budget lock-ups may include access to a variety of civil service technical experts on items in the budget, to facilitate more accurate coverage of details which may only be mentioned briefly in the budget document or budget speech. In certain jurisdictions, questions may also be posed during a time at which the finance minister attends the lockup. The attendees are typically released at the beginning of as Finance Minister's budget speech, at which time they will receive their cellular devices back.

In Australia, budget lockups can be administered within the offices of media organizations, instead of a centralized government location.

== Response ==
Lock-ups associated with the Australian budget have been controversial. In 2014, members of several trade unions claimed that they have been refused entry to a stakeholder lock-up. Some journalists consider the Australian budget media lock-up "pointless", noting that contentious matters are typically already known due to prior leaks to the press. In 2013, one unnamed attendee described the budget lock-up as "one way the Government can sell its message... They have a captive audience, quite literally."

A media lock-up held by the Government of Canada in January 2015 prior to the tabling of an anti-terrorism bill was criticized by attendees, who were denied access to the bill ahead of the press conference.

In 2011 author Nicholas Russell wrote that media lock-ups "may do more good than harm" by providing journalists with "thinking time" on complex matters. He also wrote that "It can be argued that the lock-up system leads to wholesale homogenization of the news - everyone gets basically the same story."
