= Magic (New Zealand radio network) =

Programming
- Format: News/talk

Ownership
- Owner: MediaWorks Radio

History
- First air date: 20 April 2015

Links
- Webcast: Live stream
- Website: Official website

Magic is an online New Zealand oldies programme owned by MediaWorks New Zealand. It targets New Zealand's growing population of baby boomers with a line-up of veteran broadcasters. Its breakfast show (formerly Magic in the Morning, Magic Breakfast and Bunting in the Morning respectively), is hosted by Mark McCarron.

Magic operated Magic Talk, a nationwide Auckland-based talkback, news and sport radio network formed by the 2019 rebrand of Radio Live. The station competed directly against New Zealand Media and Entertainment (NZME) station Newstalk ZB. Magic also operated Magic Music, as its music leg. This change took effect in mid-January 2019, with a large number of Radio Live hosts leaving the station due to the restructure. The first programme aired on Magic Talk was Overnights with Tony Amos. Magic Talk ceased on 20 March 2022 ahead of its delayed rebranding as Today FM on 21 March 2022. Magic Music was reintroduced as Magic. On 1 November 2025, Magic's frequencies were rebranded Breeze Classic.

== History ==
Magic was launched on 20 April 2015 in Auckland, Wellington, Christchurch, Tauranga, Rotorua, Hawke's Bay and Dunedin, some stations were launched on frequencies MediaWorks acquired in radio spectrum auctions, others were secondary frequencies used by other MediaWorks stations such as in Dunedin the 99.8FM frequency was previously used by Radio Dunedin and Wellington's 891AM previously used by The Breeze. New frequencies in Wanganui, Kāpiti, Wairarapa, Blenheim, Nelson, Queenstown, Southland and Rodney were added, followed by Palmerston North, Ashburton, Timaru, Oamaru, Taupō, Taranaki, Thames, the Seabird Coast, Paeroa, the Hauraki Plains and Hamilton. The Magic brand name has been used in other regions such as Magic FM in Northland which was owned by MediaWorks but closed down in 2001, Magic 828 & 98.6FM in Palmerston North which was rebranded The Breeze in 2004 and Magic 91FM which was a local station in Auckland during the 1980s.

The launch of Magic was made possible by the closure of Kiwi FM on March 31. Magic took over the former Kiwi FM studios in Auckland. Kiwi was an independent non-profit music broadcaster, wholly owned by MediaWorks. It operated as ten years as Kiwi FM, and had previously operated as ten years as Channel Z. The network attracted 28,000 listeners each week and was responsible for about one percent of local music airtime on New Zealand radio. However, its popularity and long-term viability had been undermined by new websites offering direct access to local music, and MediaWorks decided to focus its youth resources on the nationwide roll-out of George FM and Mai FM.

MediaWorks hoped the Magic network would increase its market share of the one million New Zealanders aged 50–74. In New Zealand this demographic is growing in size, is more likely to listen to the radio and listens to radio for longer hours. People in this group also have fewer family commitments, and have more assets and disposable incomes. MediaWorks secured a network of new frequencies in the 2014 radio spectrum auction in markets with large baby boomer populations. The company says that includes markets where Magic can go head to head with Coast, and markets with no Coast stations where Magic can secure a monopoly or gain a competitive advantage.

In November 2018, it was announced that sister station Radio Live would be merging with Magic to form a talk-music radio hybrid known as Magic Talk, which started on 19 January 2019. Former TVNZ news presenter Peter Williams was the first host revealed for the new network.

In November 2021, MediaWorks announced it would replace Magic Talk with a new talk radio network called Today FM. Newshub's political editor at the time, Tova O'Brien, was announced as breakfast host, with broadcasters Duncan Garner, Rachel Smalley, Polly Gillespie, Leah Panapa, Mark Richardson, Lloyd Burr, Wilhelmina Shrimpton, Nigel Yalden, Robett Hollis, Mark Dye, Carly Flynn, Nickson Clark, Dave Letele and Dominic Bowden all named as part of the lineup. Today FM commenced in March 2022 and ceased abruptly on 30 March 2023.

== Market ==
=== Competition ===
Magic's main competitor is NZME's network station Coast which has been broadcasting under this name since 2002 originally just in the Hawke's Bay area but began expanding to the rest of New Zealand in 2004. Both stations play a similar format. In the past MediaWorks ran a rock and roll Oldies format station called Solid Gold which initially played music from the 1950s to the 1970s and later specializing in 1960's and 70's music. In 2012 Solid Gold was rebranded as The Sound and switched format to classic rock, the format change for this station was due to a gap left in the market after Radio Hauraki moved away from classic rock music. The change in format for The Sound meant MediaWorks were no longer catering to an older audience of listeners, a gap filled by Magic.

=== Demographics ===
Magic Talk targeted 50- to 69-year-olds, an older demographic than similar MediaWorks brands. It ran alongside The Breeze with a similar playlist, but The Breeze had a younger female skew and easy listening music focus. Another MediaWorks network, The Sound, previously played similar music but now has a male skew and a rock music focus. Magic targets older listeners who have a "youthful, active approach to life" and want "fantastic music and a feel-good attitude". However, some marketing commentators have argued the "youthful" brand is out of touch with the "antiquated" classic playlist. Its playlist, drawn from the late 1950s to 1970s, includes music from Elvis Presley, The Beach Boys, Roy Orbison, Dusty Springfield and Rod Stewart.

=== Ratings ===
As of May 2025, Magic has the fifth-highest share of the New Zealand commercial radio market at 6.4%.

Magic commercial radio ratings (May 2025)
Market	Station share	Change	Rank
All markets	6.4	▼ −0.4	5
Auckland	5.0	▲ +0.1	5
Christchurch	6.9	▼ −2.2	6
Wellington	4.5	▼ −0.4	9
Waikato	4.9	▲ +0.2	9
Tauranga	7.7	▼ −1.7	4
Manawatū	9.8	▲ +2	2
Hawke's Bay	12.4	▲ +1.7	2
Northland	1.5	▲ +1.5	14
Dunedin	7.7	▲ +0.1	5
Taranaki	11.2	▲ +0.9	3
Nelson	7.7	▲ +0.3	6
Southland	11.4	▲ +0.3	3
Rotorua	9.4	▲ +0.1	3

== Programmes ==
Breakfast Magic Breakfast with Mark McCarron between 6am and 10am weekdays and is preceded by REX Live between 5am and 6am. Previous hosts include Mark Leishman and Mark Bunting.

Workday Magic Workday with Mel Homer between 10am and 3pm weekdays. Previous hosts include Murray Lindsay, Bob Gentil, Mark Smith, Sue White and Trudi Nelson.

Drive Magic Drive with Bob Gentil between 3pm and 8pm weekdays. Previous hosts include Mark Smith and Murray Lindsay.

Nights Evenings and overnights are fully automated between 8pm and 6am the next morning. Previous night hosts include Brent Harbour and Bob Gentil.

Weekends Weekend shows are hosted on Saturdays and Sundays by various announcers with REX Focus, hosted by Mark McCarron and Dominic George, running between 5am and 7am. Saturday nights are automated from 6pm until 6am the next morning with The Saturday Night Jukebox running between 6pm and 12am. Country Magic runs between 7pm and 12am Sunday nights.

== Music ==
Magic's playlist includes tracks from Elvis Presley, the Bee Gees, The Supremes, The Beatles, The Rat Pack, Motown, Frank Sinatra, and Rod Stewart's Great American Song Book. The Magic website also features news and showcases music from Aretha Franklin, Bette Midler, Dusty Springfield, Percy Sledge, Paul McCartney, Hot Chocolate and Simon and Garfunkel. The station's first in-studio interview was with Dennis Locorriere from Dr. Hook & the Medicine Show. His appearance included a solo performance of an acoustic mash-up of some of the band's most popular songs, including When You're in Love with a Beautiful Woman, The Cover of Rolling Stone and Sylvia's Mother.

== Other services ==
=== Events and promotions ===
To celebrate its launch in April 2015, Magic gave away 100 prize packs and a trip to Sydney to see Neil Diamond in concert. In the same year, the network also sponsored Neil Diamond concerts in Auckland and Dunedin, Singin’ in the Rain in Auckland and Wellington, an Elton John concert in Wellington, a Laurence Aberhart exhibition at Auckland Art Gallery, the New Zealand International Film Festival, a nationwide tour of 10cc, and a Beach Boys concert at Mount Maunganui. Magic is a proud sponsor of Repco Beach Hop, a rock 'n' roll and hot rod festival held in Whangamatā every March.
