= Resort Radio =

Radio station in Queenstown, New Zealand

Coordinates: 45°01′51″S 168°39′42″E

Resort Radio (99FM) was a radio station in Queenstown on 99.2FM, 100.0FM and 1359AM. Originally this station was owned by Radio Otago, until Radio Otago was sold to RadioWorks in 1999. During the nineties, programming during the evenings and nights was a simulcast of Foveaux FM in Southland with Southland advertisements. Foveaux announcers would read out the weather for Queenstown during the evenings especially for Resort Radio listeners.

During the winter ski season in the mid-1990s, there was a 'apres ski show' featuring local content and programming broadcast between 6pm and 10pm.

After Radio Otago was sold to RadioWorks local programming was brought back to Resort Radio during the evenings and overnight.

In 2004, Resort Radio was rebranded as More FM when RadioWorks rebranded the majority of their LocalWorks stations to More FM.

With the station now part of the More FM network, the station is now only local between 6am-12pm weekdays. Out of these times the station is networked from Auckland. The current breakfast show is hosted by Joel Palmer, and was previously hosted by Margo Berryman and Henry Youngman (6am-10am) & Janey Newlands hosted the workday show (10am-1pm). Philippa Collins, Jono and Jo Blick formerly rotated hosting duties on weekends.

== Awards ==
In 2002, Resort Radio was nominated for the best provincial radio station by the Radio Broadcasting Association for the third consecutive year.
