= Energy FM (New Zealand radio station) =

Private radio station

Energy FM (Taranaki)
- Location: Taranaki, New Zealand

Energy FM was a privately owned radio station that broadcast from studios in New Plymouth, New Zealand. The station began life as a series of short term summer broadcasts from 1984 until it secured a full-time license to broadcast on 93.2 MHz in late 1987. The station was set up by politician Steven Joyce who sold it to form RadioWorks a few years later.

Energy FM was re-branded as More FM Taranaki in December 2004 as part of an initiative by then owner MediaWorks to extend that network's brand.

== Short-term broadcasts ==
Energy FM ran four short term broadcasts while attempting to secure a full-time FM warrant from the New Zealand Broadcasting Tribunal. At the time the station was also in competition from a number of other companies also seeking the right to broadcast full-time on the FM band.

=== On air dates ===
15 December 1986 – 31 January 1987

== Full time FM warrant ==
Fifteen months after the original hearings were heard the Broadcasting Tribunal granted FM warrants to Energy Enterprises Ltd and the Broadcasting Corporation of New Zealand (BCNZ) while another contender (Action FM Ltd) was denied a warrant.

In July 1987 the BCNZ appealed against the Energy FM warrant decision. At the time this had the potential impact of delaying the stations launch by up to six months while the appeal went through the High Court in Wellington. The appeal was against the twelve-month period the BCNZ had to wait after Energy FM's launch before it could go to air with its own rival station – ZMFM.

The High Court appeal was dropped in August 1987 clearing the way for the station to launch by the end of the year.

On 30 November 1987 the station commenced full-time broadcasts. Breakfast Host Darren Mills launched the station by playing Wang Chung – Let's Go.
