= Radio Windy =

New Zealand radio station

New Zealand
- Broadcast area: Wellington New Zealand
- Frequencies: 94.1 MHz, 98.1 MHz, 891 kHz
- Branding: Radio Windy / Windy FM

Programming
- Format: Music

History
- First air date: 1973
- Call sign meaning: 2XW

Technical information
- Class: Terrestrial

Radio Windy was a local radio station in Wellington, New Zealand. It was started in 1973 and in 1993 was rebranded as The Breeze.

== History ==
Radio Windy first started by Capital City Radio Limited broadcasting in Wellington in 1973 on 1080 kHz with the call sign 2XW. In 1976 the station moved to 890 kHz and in 1978, after the AM band spacing in New Zealand was adjusted from 10 kHz to 9 kHz, the station moved to 891 kHz.

In 1990, Radio Windy began broadcasting on 100.0 MHz in Wellington and the station was renamed to Windy FM and also continued to broadcast on 891 kHz. In 1991 the 100.0 MHz frequency was taken over by The Frader Group used to start the very first More FM station in Wellington. Radio Windy subsequently began broadcasting on 94.1 MHz in Wellington and 98.1 MHz in the Hutt Valley. At the same time the station changed to a Classic rock format.

In 1993, the station was rebranded as The Breeze.
