= Lite FM (New Zealand) =

- New Zealand
- Broadcast area: Christchurch, New Zealand
- Frequency: 94.5 FM

Programming
- Format: Easy Listening

Ownership
- Owner: MediaWorks

History
- First air date: 1997

Technical information
- Transmitter coordinates: 43°36′12″S 172°38′58″E

Lite FM was a New Zealand radio station broadcasting in Christchurch on 94.5FM. The station was launched in 1997 by Radio Otago in Dunedin on 90.2 FM, and also networked to Invercargill on 98.0 FM. Initial programming on the station was mostly voice tracked and on air the station was often called "The Lite FM Network."

In 1998 Lite FM began broadcasting in Christchurch hen Radio Otago rebranded Easy Listening i94 as Lite FM. (C93FM Limited had launched Easy Listening i94 in 1994 by under a franchise agreement with Easy Listening; C93FM was then purchased by Radio Otago in 1997.)

In 1999 Radio Otago was sold to RadioWorks and the Invercargill and Dunedin stations were replaced with network station Solid Gold. Lite FM continued to broadcast in Christchurch and became part of Radioworks' collection of local stations known as LocalWorks.

As of 2001, Lite FM's popular afternoon drivetime radio host was Peter Mac, also known as Peter McQuarters.

In 2004, the station was rebranded and replaced by The Breeze, as part of a decision by Radioworks to rebrand all its local Easy Listening stations with this name. Today The Breeze in Christchurch remains a live and local station, despite other The Breeze stations having their local shows replaced with Auckland-based network shows, However the night show now comes from Auckland.
