= Cape Wanbrow =

Rocky headland in New Zealand

- Cape
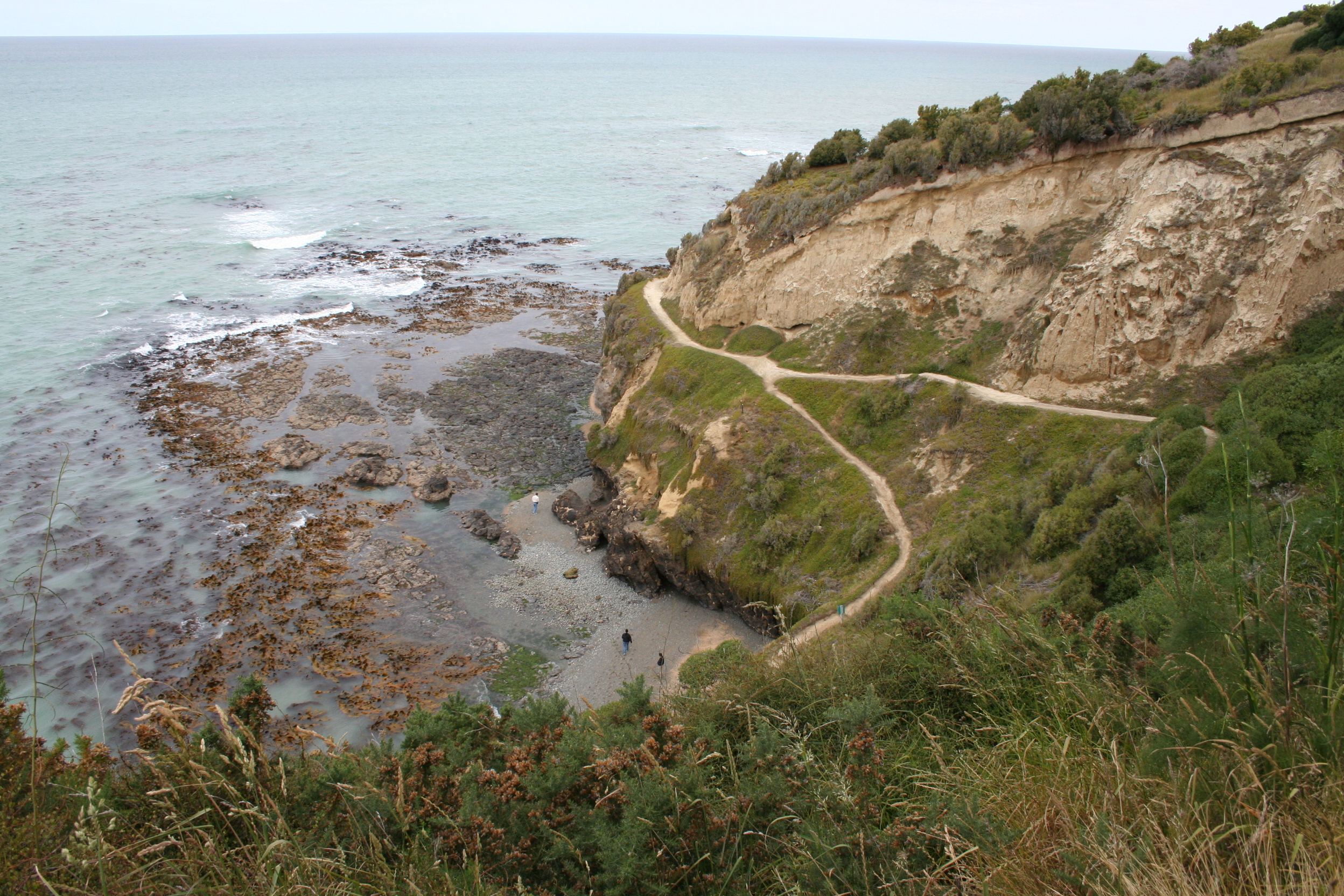
- Cliff adjacent to Cape Wanbrow
- Water bodies: South Pacific Ocean
- Age: Oligocene (38–34.2 Ma)
- Formed by: Erosion and volcanism
- Geology: basaltic tephra deposits, tholeiitic pillow lavas, limestone, mudstone and siltstone
- Highest elevation: 133 m (436 ft)

Cape Wanbrow is a rocky headland overlooking Oamaru Harbour, New Zealand. Although it has been a commercial forestry area for a number of decades, the cape is now primarily a Council controlled reserve, and is gradually being replanted with native trees and shrubs. It has a network of walking tracks and mountain bike tracks, and is popular with the public.

Cape Wanbrow was an important lookout point during the Second World War and hosts a gun emplacement and remains of the original magazine which served the fortified gun. Below the cape on its north side is a protected area which is home to a blue penguin colony, and rare yellow-eyed penguins are to the south of the cape. New Zealand fur seals and occasionally elephant seals are found resting on the rocks.

The geology of the rock making up the cape is complex as layered within the sedimentary rocks are no less than 6 Surtseyan volcanoes of the monogenetic Waiareka-Deborah volcanic field.
