= Channel X (New Zealand radio station) =

New Zealand radio station

- New Zealand
- Broadcast area: 16 markets
- RDS: channelX; PI 9240
- Branding: Your Throwback Playlist

Programming
- Format: Throwbacks

Ownership
- Owner: MediaWorks New Zealand

History
- First air date: 8 May 2023; 3 years ago

Links
- Webcast: Live stream
- Website: Official website

Channel X is a New Zealand throwback music station owned by MediaWorks. The station can be heard in 16 markets across New Zealand, and online through MediaWorks's streaming platform, rova. The station plays uninterrupted music from the 1990s to 2010s with occasional one-liners or station IDs. The station does not have announcers and does not air news, sport, weather or traffic information. It does have occasional advertising.

== History ==
Channel X began on 8 May 2023, following the demise of news and talk station Today FM on 30 March. Regions where another brand was not allocated ran a music-only playlist of songs from the 80s and 90s as a stunt.

In mid-April, MediaWorks filed for trademark of the "Channel X" brand name and domain channelx.co.nz.

The station was announced on 3 May through an encoded message playing on what would become Channel X's frequencies with the station's name, along with a shift in the stunt to a loop of various songs, TV show clips and news stories from the 90s and 2000s. The message was visible using an audio spectrogram. On 5 May, the loop was updated to encode the date and time the station would begin airing.

At noon on 8 May 2023, the station began with a countdown where they encoded "5.. 4.. 3.. 2.. 1.. hello :)" into the audio before introducing the radio station that "doesn't have any prizes, or shows". This was followed by a skit referencing the Now That's What I Call Music! album compilations that were popular in the late 1990s. The first song to play on the station was the 2006 single "When You Were Young" by The Killers.

== Frequencies ==
Channel X broadcasts to 16 markets on these FM frequencies:

- Auckland: 106.2
- Hamilton: 107.3
- Tauranga: 100.6
- Rotorua: 95.1
- Hawke's Bay: 106.3
- Manawatū: 94.6
- Kāpiti: 99.1
- Wairarapa: 98.3
- Wellington: 104.5
- Nelson: 96.0
- Blenheim: 95.3
- Timaru: 105.9
- Oamaru: 100.8
- Dunedin: 100.6
- Queenstown: 91.2
- Southland: 94.0
