= The Breeze (New Zealand radio station) =

- New Zealand
- Broadcast area: 25 markets nationwide
- Branding: The Breeze

Programming
- Format: Adult contemporary music

Ownership
- Owner: MediaWorks New Zealand

History
- First air date: 1993

Technical information
- Class: Terrestrial/Internet

Links
- Webcast: Live stream
- Website: Official website

The Breeze is a New Zealand radio station playing an adult contemporary music format owned by MediaWorks New Zealand. It airs in 25 markets across New Zealand and each market shows a mix of local and network programmes.

The station reached its highest ever audience of 671,000 listeners in 2021.

The Breeze launched a television channel called The Breeze TV in March 2020, which was acquired in December 2020 by Discovery, Inc. as part of its purchase of MediaWorks' television operations. Breeze TV became an online-only channel in March 2022. It ceased broadcasting in December 2022.

== History ==
=== Early years ===
In 1993, owner Independent Broadcasting Company rebranded local stations 91FM (Auckland), Kiwi 898FM (Waikato), and Windy FM (Wellington) to The Breeze. The Auckland and Waikato stations previously played a hit music format and were changed to a hot adult contemporary format using the slogan "Not Too Heavy, Not Too Soft." In Wellington, Windy FM had played classic rock before rebranding and changing to the easy listening format that would be used on future Breeze stations.

All three stations of The Breeze ran separately from each other, and each market had its own local shows.

=== Change of ownership ===
In 1995, The Breeze in Wellington was sold to the More FM Group, and in 1996, its parent company in Auckland and Waikato was sold to Prospect Limited.

At the end of 1996, Prospect Limited was sold to The Radio Network (TRN), and in 1997, TRN closed down The Breeze in Auckland and Waikato. It then used these frequencies to start 91ZM in Auckland, and 89.8ZM in Waikato.

The Breeze continued to broadcast in Wellington, and by 2000 the station was owned by Canwest, along with More FM and Channel Z, CanWest then purchased RadioWorks, and in 2001 The Breeze became part of RadioWorks collection of local once off stations known as LocalWorks. RadioWorks, later known as MediaWorks Radio.

=== Expansion to other markets ===
The Breeze made a return to Waikato in 2003 when local station Y 99.3 was rebranded as The Breeze, retaining Y99.3 local announcers but changing music format from adult contemporary to easy listening.

In 2004, MediaWorks decided to make their local station branding consistent in each market: In regions where MediaWorks operated one local radio station, it was rebranded as More FM, and if a second local station was operating in the region, that station became The Breeze.

=== Networking ===
In 2006 The Breeze launched in the Auckland market as a completely new station.

In April 2007, Dunedin and Palmerston North were the first two regions to replace some of its local programming, focusing on delivering a local breakfast show only. Creating a network allowed The Breeze to launch in other markets such as Hawke's Bay, Bay of Plenty and, Southland.

In March 2009, a live networked breakfast show was introduced. The networked breakfast could be heard in regions where there was no local breakfast show - regions with a live breakfast show were not affected. In 2010 the networked breakfast was replaced with the Auckland breakfast show, presented by The Two Robbies (Robbie Rakete and Robert Scott).

In 2015, The Breeze added more local programming. In the Waikato, a local drive show was added. The More FM local breakfast announcers in Dunedin and Hawke's Bay were moved to the local The Breeze stations in their respective markets.

In 2017, The Breeze Auckland moved away from a network product to become a fully local radio offering. All show day parts, including weekends and overnights, are now local to Auckland only; this is the only metro major brand offering this.

In 2018, The Breeze launched in Timaru, Oamaru, Ashburton, and the Mackenzie Country, with a local breakfast show broadcast to the regions.

=== Format change ===
Traditionally known as an easy listening radio station, The Breeze dropped this title in 2011. The Breeze in 2017 dropped 60's from its playlist. Positioned as "Your place to relax", with More Music, Less Talk.

=== Television arm ===
On 16 April 2020, The Breeze launched Breeze TV, a music TV channel on Freeview channel 14 and Sky channel 119. On 1 December 2020, international media company Discovery, Inc. acquired Breeze TV as part of its acquisition of MediaWorks' television arm. The Breeze TV closed down in December 2022.

== Stations ==
=== Network ===
City/Town	Frequencies
Mid-Northland	100.7 MHz
Whangārei	90.8 MHz
Rodney	104.9 MHz
Auckland	93.4 MHz
Waikato	99.4 MHz
Tauranga	95.8 MHz
Thames/Hauraki	90.8 MHz
Pauanui/Tairua	90.7 MHz
Mercury Bay	96.7 MHz
Whangamatā	99.5 MHz
Rotorua	91.9 MHz
Taupō	100.8 MHz
Whakatāne	92.1 MHz
Gisborne	94.9 MHz
Hawke's Bay	97.5 MHz
Taranaki	92.4 MHz
Whanganui	97.6 MHz
Manawatū	98.6 MHz
Kāpiti Coast	100.7 MHz
Wairarapa	99.9 MHz
Wellington	94.1 MHz, 98.5 MHz
Nelson	97.6 MHz
Marlborough	89.7 MHz (Blenheim); 98.7 MHz (Picton); 97.1 MHz (Kaikoura)
Christchurch	94.5 MHz (Christchurch); 100.5 MHz (Lyttelton)
Ashburton	106.1 MHz (Ashburton)
South Canterbury	92.3 MHz (Timaru)
North & East Otago	97.6 MHz (Oamaru)
Otematata	90.1 MHz
Mackenzie	99.8 MHz
Omarama	98.9 MHz
Dunedin	98.2 MHz
Queenstown	99.2 MHz (Queenstown); 97.8 MHz (Wanaka)
Alexandra	96.7 MHz (Alexandra)
Southland	91.6 MHz

Networked programmes on The Breeze originate from the Auckland studios (except the daytime show and the network breakfast show, which originate from the Christchurch studios since March 2025). The first network breakfast shown was The Two Robbies as the show was originally presented by Robbie Rakete and Robert Scott. In 2015 Robert Scott moved to the Drive show and was initially replaced by Anna Thomas, before Jeanette Thomas joined the show in 2016.

In April 2016 the Wellington breakfast show presented by Steve Joll and Kath Bier became the network breakfast show presented from the Wellington studios until the end of 2018.

Since Late 2025 Gareth Lischner hosts the network breakfast show for markets that do not have local breakfast shows. Previously the show was hosted by Kris Edwards from January 2019 until December 2021, Justin Rae from January 2022 until 2023, Mike Puru from 2023 until 2025 and Adam Percival during early 2025.

The workday show has been presented from the Christchurch studios by Sarah van der Kley from July until December 2022 and since March 2025. This show was presented from Auckland by Kerry Smith until she died in April 2011 and Alison Leonard from 2011 until July 2022 and Robert Scott from 2023 until February 2025.

Mike Puru presents the drive show from the Auckland studios since March 2025. Previously the show was presented from the Auckland studios by Mark Leishman, before he moved to newly created MediaWorks station Magic until his departure in December 2022, Robert Scott from April 2015 until December 2022 and from Christchurch by Sarah van der Kley from January 2023 until February 2025.

All regions take the networked night show which is presented by Tania Burgess.

=== Northland ===
The Breeze launched in Northland in March 2023. It broadcasts to the Mid-Northland area (including Kaikohe) on 100.7 MHz and to Whangārei on 90.8 MHz. The two frequencies were previously used by other MediaWorks brands (including Radio Live, Magic Talk and Today FM).

=== Rodney ===
The Breeze launched in Rodney and the upper part of the Auckland region in January 2023. It broadcasts on 104.9 MHz, a frequency previously used by Magic.

=== Auckland ===
Launched on 12 June 2006 on the former Solid Gold FM frequency with Solid Gold moving to 93.8 MHz. The Auckland studio is where all network shows are produced where all announcers also produce a local show for Auckland, with voice breaks tailored to the Auckland audience. In 2016 a local Auckland only breakfast show was reinstated presented by Robert Rakete and Jeanette Thomas. The major change in 2017, The Breeze Auckland is local 24 hours a day, seven days a week. The only major metro radio brand in New Zealand to offer a full local offering.

=== Waikato ===
This station was originally Waikato's Y99.3 playing an Adult Contemporary Music Format. The station was relaunched as The Breeze in April 2003, this was the very first station to be rebranded as The Breeze.

=== Coromandel Peninsula ===
The Breeze broadcasts in Thames on 90.8 MHz, Mercury Bay on 96.7 MHz, Pauanui/Tairua on 90.7 MHz and Whangamata on 99.5 MHz.

=== Tauranga ===
The Breeze launched in Tauranga around September 2007 on 96.1 MHz, a frequency previously used by other MediaWorks brands (including Radio Pacific and, later, Radio Live), before moving to 95.8 MHz.

=== Rotorua ===
The Breeze launched in Rotorua in 2008 broadcasting temporarily on 96.7. Previously 96.7 had been used to broadcast Mai FM into Rotorua, RadioWorks purchased Mai FM in March 2008 and replaced Mai FM with The Breeze. However, when The Radio Network purchased the 96.7 MHz frequency in July, it switched frequency to 91.9 MHz, formerly used by Radio Live.

=== Whakatāne ===
The Breeze launched in Whakatāne on 1 June 2023. It broadcasts on 92.1 MHz, a frequency previously used by other MediaWorks brands (including Radio Pacific, Radio Live, Magic Talk and Today FM).

=== Gisborne ===
The Breeze launched in Gisborne in March 2023. It broadcasts on 94.9 MHz, a frequency previously used by other MediaWorks brands (including Radio Pacific, Radio Live, Magic Talk and Today FM). Prior to 2010, Radio Pacific and, later, Radio Live were broadcast on 94.8 MHz.

=== Hawke's Bay ===
Commenced broadcasting 6 August 2007, on 97.5 MHz, the frequency previously used by Radio Pacific (now 549 kHz), then by Radio Live (now 106.3FM). In 2015 a local breakfast was introduced when More FM Hawkes Bay announcers Kevin Wagg and Megan Banks moved to The Breeze. In April 2017, Martin Good moved from The Hits to The Breeze. In September 2018, Good's former co-host from The Hits, Sarah, also moved to The Breeze Breakfast. In January 2022, Sarah was replaced by Jacque Tucker (transferred from More FM Rodney).

=== Taranaki ===
The Breeze originally launched in Taranaki in February 2008 broadcasting on 100.4 MHz, a frequency not previously used by any other station, however after less than six months on the air this frequency was taken over by student station The Most FM. The Breeze was relaunched on 92.3 MHz, a frequency that ironically was previously occupied by The Most FM. Before switching to a live networked breakfast in March 2009.

=== Manawatu ===
This station was originally Manawatū's Magic 98.6FM. It was relaunched as The Breeze in 2004 when RadioWorks rebranded all their Easy Listening stations as The Breeze.

=== Wairarapa ===
The Breeze began transmission across the Wairarapa from the Popoiti transmitter southeast of Greytown and northeast of Martinborough in March 2010. It originally broadcast on 99.8 MHz, a frequency which had previously been used by More FM Wairarapa's Martinborough infill (which moved to 105.5 MHz). In October 2010, the frequency was altered slightly to 99.9 MHz as part of the nationwide realignment of FM frequencies. Brent Gare presents the local breakfast show.

=== Kāpiti Coast ===
The Breeze began transmission across the Kāpiti Coast and Horowhenua regions in late 2004. This occurred when RadioWorks replaced all of their local stations with the More FM brand. Subsequently, local station 90.2 2XX FM was rebranded as More FM, however as there was already a local More FM station in existence on 99.6 MHz, that frequency became The Breeze 99.6.

=== Wellington ===
Wellington is the home of the very first The Breeze radio station under the Easy Listening format. The history of this station dates back to the 1970s as Radio Windy and later Windy FM when the station switched to FM. Radio Windy changed formats several times from Easy Listening to Adult Contemporary to Classic Rock before changing back to Easy Listening when the station became The Breeze in 1993. The format of The Breeze in Wellington was then rolled out to other stations in 2003 and 2004.

The local Wellington breakfast show with Steve Joll & Kath Bier became the network breakfast show into selected regions from April 2016 until December 2018. From 2019 the show reverted to being a local show for Wellington.

In May 2021, Shelley Venning replaced Kath Bier as co-host of the local breakfast show.

The Breeze Wellington broadcasts on 94.1 MHz and 98.5 MHz.

=== Nelson ===
The Breeze launched in Nelson in March 2008 broadcasting on 97.8 MHz. Previously this frequency was used to broadcast Radio Pacific and more recently BSport, however these stations broadcast on 97.6 MHz, and now broadcast on 990 kHz. The Breeze is now on its old Radio Pacific frequency 97.6 MHz.

=== Marlborough ===
In January 2008 RadioWorks purchased Marlborough Media, which operated two local stations Sounds FM and Easy FM. Later in 2008 Easy FM was rebranded as The Breeze broadcasting on 96.1 MHz.

=== Christchurch ===
This station was originally Canterbury's Lite 94.5 FM. It was relaunched as The Breeze in 2004 when RadioWorks rebranded all their easy listening stations.

As of 31 March 2023, The Breeze Christchurch broadcasts on 94.5 MHz and 738 kHz (replacing the now-defunct Today FM) and to Lyttelton on 100.5 MHz.

=== South Canterbury ===
MediaWorks purchased Timaru radio station Port FM in April 2018 with Port FM being rebranded as More FM shortly after. Before this acquisition, MediaWorks had operated many of their network stations in the South Canterbury and West Coast of the South Island under a franchise agreement with Port FM. Following the sale of Port FM The Breeze was started in Timaru on 89.9FM and 92.3FM and the local breakfast announcer from Port FM was moved to The Breeze South Canterbury. From Timaru, Gareth Lischner hosts the network breakfast show.

=== Dunedin ===
The Breeze began in Dunedin at 7pm on 3 December 2004 a week after the frequency's former 98 More FM switched to 97.4 MHz. Initially, the programme was a simulcast of The Breeze Christchurch. In April 2007 Tracy Chambers (the daytime announcer) was moved to the breakfast show to present a local breakfast. In October 2021 The Breeze Breakfast show with Damian & Hannah is simulcast to Radio Dunedin due to Owen Rooney's departure on 1 October 2021.

=== Queenstown ===
Radioworks purchased Queenstown radio station Q92FM in March 2006 and later rebranded the station as Q92 The Breeze. Originally Q92FM played Adult Contemporary Music but was changed to the Easy Listening format used by The Breeze when the station was rebranded. Q92 The Breeze could also be heard in Wanaka on 96.8 MHz and previously in Central Otago (however Central Otago now takes the networked The Breeze). In late 2009 the station traded places on the FM dial with 99.2 More FM with the More FM station becoming Q92 99.4 More FM (the 99.4 MHz frequency is for Wanaka). At the same time the local breakfast show that was on The Breeze in Queenstown was moved to More FM with The Breeze in Queenstown now running networked shows at all times. Q92FM was purchased by Australian radio mogul Kevin Blyton in November 1992 and was later sold.

=== Central Otago ===
The Breeze began broadcasting in Central Otago in 2007 originally this station was a relay of the Queenstown programme with Queenstown advertising. In 2009 this was replaced with the Auckland-based network feed with local Central Otago advertising.

=== Southland ===
The Breeze launched in Southland at 11 pm on Sunday 28 October 2007 on 91.6 MHz, a frequency previously used by Radio Pacific. Radio Pacific was rebranded as BSport the following morning and in Southland moved to 1224 kHz.

== Ratings ==
As of May 2025, The Breeze has the second-highest share of the New Zealand commercial radio market at 9.4%, behind Newstalk ZB.

The Breeze commercial radio ratings (May 2025)
Market	Station share	Change	Rank
All markets	9.4	▲ +0.4	2
Auckland	9.0	▲ +0.2	3
Christchurch	11.9	▼ −0.4	2
Wellington	13.6	▲ +3.7	2
Waikato	8.2	▲ +1.4	5
Tauranga	6.1	▼ −2.3	9
Manawatū	8.7	▼ −0.3	3
Hawke's Bay	10.6	▲ +0.5	3
Northland	3.2	▲ +0.4	10
Dunedin	8.6	▲ +0.8	3
Taranaki	5.6	▼ −0.1	8
Nelson	10.6	▼ −4	2
Southland	7.9	no change	5
Rotorua	12.8	▲ +1.1	1

== Controversy ==
=== Broadcasting standards breaches ===
In August 2016, the Broadcasting Standards Authority (BSA) upheld a complaint against The Breeze regarding a March 2016 competition in which listeners were invited to nominate someone deserving of a shopping spree. During the segment, a caller spoke on air about her friend, saying she had just left a “potentially abusive relationship.” The friend’s husband complained, arguing the broadcast breached his privacy. The BSA found he was identifiable and that the segment disclosed highly sensitive personal information, breaching the privacy standard. The station was ordered to pay $1,000 in compensation to the complainant.
