= TAB Trackside =

New Zealand horse racing broadcast networks

Trackside
- Country: New Zealand
- Broadcast area: New Zealand

Programming
- Picture format: 16:9 (HDTV)

Ownership
- Owner: TAB New Zealand

History
- Launched: 1978
- Former names: TV: Action TV, TAB TV, TAB Trackside; Radio: TAB Trackside Radio, Radio Pacific, bSport, LiveSport

Links
- Website: Official Website

Availability

Streaming media
- Trackside: trackside.co.nz
- Sky Go: skygo.co.nz

Trackside (previously known as TAB Trackside) is a New Zealand horse racing and sports broadcast network, incorporating two free-to-air television channels. The TV channels are available on Sky as well as Freeview terrestrial and streaming services. The radio station broadcasts on 14 AM radio and 16 FM radio frequencies from Kaitaia to Invercargill were suspended on 12 April 2020.

Together, the outlets provide full coordinated coverage of all thoroughbred horse racing, harness horse racing and greyhound racing in New Zealand, most racing from Australia, and many races from Hong Kong, Singapore and other countries. The channels provides tickers and commentary with up-to-the-minute odds, field and dividend information. Between races, they feature on-track interviews, in-studio analysis, live footage of horses warming up for races, replays of previous races, and recaps of betting odds.

The live broadcasting of horse racing in the New Zealand dates back to the launch of a racing radio network in 1978. The station, originally known as Radio Pacific and later as bSport and LiveSport, became TAB Trackside Radio. A racing television station launched in 1992, initially known as Action TV and later as Trackside, is now Trackside 1. A second racing television station launched in 2007, known initially as TAB TV, is now Trackside 2.

== History ==
=== Radio Pacific ===
This was the Radio Pacific logo in 1991.

Racing network Radio Pacific began in Auckland in 1978, and became one of the first commercial stations to be networked across the country in the early 1990s. The network combined news, news talkback, sports talkback and live racing commentaries.

Radio Pacific became a listed company on the New Zealand Stock Exchange and the Totalisator Agency Board became its major shareholder. Radio Pacific's Waikato station began as Radio Waikato, New Zealand's third privately owned station. It originally broadcast in 930AM in 1971, before moving 954AM in 1978. In 1986 Radio Waikato changed to a country music format and was renamed Country Gold - Waikato 954. In 1988 it was sold to Radio Pacific and transitioned into a local talk radio format with national racing commentary. It changed its name to Radio Pacific and eventually replaced local programmes with Auckland networked programmes. A new station of the same name also operated in Hamilton between 1993 and 1994.

=== Other radio stations ===
This was the LiveSport logo in 2010.

The company also owned the North Island music station group Energy Enterprises and merged with the South Island radio company Radio Otago in 1999. Between May 2000 and January 2001 it was purchased by CanWest Global Communications, becoming part of RadioWorks and later part of MediaWorks New Zealand. Part of the company was purchased in July 2004, and the entire company was sold off in June 2007.

Before 2005 live races and betting odds had been broadcast on Radio Pacific in pre-determined, limited periods during the race day under a contract with the New Zealand Racing Board. Between 2001 and 2005, this was also complemented by a trial Radio Trackside station in the Southland market dedicated to racing coverage.

In 2005 MediaWorks launched new talkback network Radio Live and moved many of Radio Pacific's talkback personalities across to the new network. John Banks continued to host Radio Pacific's breakfast programme, and Alice Worsley and Martin Crump co-hosted a new morning talkback programme. A Trackside TV simulcast, branded as Radio Trackside, was broadcast in the afternoon. On 29 October 2007 Radio Pacific became BSport and its tagline became "BSport, the station you can bet on". The general talkback format was replaced with a sports talkback format. MediaWorks New Zealand and Trackside shared the network's Auckland studios, with live sports talk and betting odds in the morning, and live races and betting odds in the afternoon.

In January 2010 BSport was renamed LiveSport, the sister network to Radio Live. It became TAB Trackside Radio on 13 April 2015, when it came under the full ownership of the New Zealand Racing Board.

=== COVID-19, sale and buyback of radio frequencies ===
This was the TAB Trackside logo in 2014.

The radio simulcast on the AM and FM frequencies was suspended on 12 April 2020 due to the impact of the COVID-19 pandemic in New Zealand, which saw all domestic horse and greyhound racing halted for several weeks. The simulcast of racing continued on the TAB website, TAB app and via third-party apps.

The full-powered broadcast licences previously broadcasting TAB Trackside Radio were purchased by the Australian Sports Entertainment Network (SEN) in 2021, which began broadcasting a general sport format known as SENZ, providing a continuous sports-talk format left open by the COVID-19-related closure of NZME's Radio Sport the previous year.

However, following financial losses at the new station, a deal was reached in November 2023 - also involving the TAB's then-new operating partner Entain - for the TAB to buy back the frequencies and SENZ station assets, with SEN continuing to make content available and to source advertising revenue for the network; the sale completed on 29 February 2024.

=== Television ===
Trackside began television broadcasting in 1992 as Action TV - a free-to-air UHF station that only broadcast during live racing events. In 1993, it changed its name to Trackside. From 1994, Sky Television began using broadcasting Discovery Channel to subscribers when Trackside was in closedown. The station received a dedicated channel on the new Sky Digital platform in 1999, which began broadcasting 18 hours a day from 2004 and 24 hours a day from 2007. In addition to live New Zealand racing, the channel introduced racing replay, preview and review shows, and live racing and racing shows from Australia. The channel began broadcasting in widescreen from 15 December 2008.

In October 2009, TAB introduced a second channel - TAB TV - to accommodate live racing from Hong Kong and Singapore. In December 2010, Trackside became available on the Freeview terrestrial service. In October 2013 it changed the TVNZ metadata on the Freeview satellite service to unlock access to Trackside TV, keeping TAB TV as a pay-TV channel. On 14 April 2014, it ceased operations on Freeview, becoming only available to Sky subscribers. In August 2014, Trackside TV and TAB TV were relaunched as TAB Trackside 1 and TAB Trackside 2, extending racing coverage from all codes and enabling up to 5000 additional races to be broadcast each year that were previously not scheduled.

Trackside own and operate several outside broadcasting vans which tour the country to provide live coverage of races.

== Programmes ==
=== Weekdays ===
- The Kick Off, the weekday breakfast show on Trackside Radio and Trackside 2, is hosted by Glen Larmer, a former Newstalk ZB, Radio Sport, TVNZ7 and RadioLive presenter. Former hosts of the show include broadcaster Nathan Rarere (2007–2015), cricket commentator Ian Smith (2007–2015), rugby commentator Jeff Wilson (2013), former boxer Monty Betham (2014), and broadcasters Martin Devlin (2010–2012) and Brendan Telfer (2014–2015).
- The Best of the Kick Off, the mid-morning show on Trackside Radio and Trackside 2, features highlights of the breakfast show. Former hosts of the show include James McOnie (2006–2007) and farmer and former All Black Richard Loe (2006–2015).
- DogZone, a weekly greyhound racing show hosted by Elizabeth Whelan and greyhound commentator Peter Earley, airs on Tuesdays at 7pm on Trackside 1. It is. The Box Seat, a racing panel show hosted by Greg O'Connor with Craig "The Whale" Thompson and Michael Guerin, airs on Trackside 1 on Wednesdays at 8.30pm. Australian Sky Racing shows Inside Running, Formline, The Catching Pen, Bred To Win, In The Gig, Autumn Live and Australian Racing Retro are broadcast every week at various times.
- Live and repeated racing airs from 11am.

=== Saturdays ===
- The Two Halves is the Saturday breakfast show on Trackside Radio and Trackside 2. It is hosted by Jenny-May Coffin and focuses on rugby union and rugby league. She replaced The Fishing Show with Grant Blair, Terry Williams-King, John Eichlsheim and Bruce 'Swish' Duncan, which broadcast on the slot from 2005 to 2015. The Starting Gates, a Saturday morning scratching programme, is hosted by Alby Gain and Peter Earley.
- On the Sideline, a Saturday morning show on Trackside Radio and Trackside 2, is hosted by TAB bookmakers Grant Nisbett and Mark Stafford.
- The First Call, a racing panel preview show, airs on Trackside 1 from 10am. It is hosted by Darryl Anderson and features Stu Laing and Aiden Rodley.
- Live and repeated racing airs from 11am.

=== Sundays ===
- Sunday Breakfast airs on Trackside Radio and Trackside 2. Dale Budge hosts the first two hours, the All American Sports Show covering American sports and While You Were Sleeping focusing on world sport. Ryan Bradley hosts the third hour of Sunday morning scratchings. Stephen McIvor previously hosted Sunday breakfast, including a one-hour trans-Tasman simulcast with 1116 SEN.
- The World of Football is broadcast 9am Sunday mornings on Trackside Radio. It is hosted by Riccardo Ball and former Football Fern Rebecca Sowden, and was previously hosted by coach and former All White Wynton Rufer. Racing Talkback, a Sunday morning talkback radio programme hosted by Des Coppins, is broadcast from 10am Sunday mornings on Trackside Radio.
- Weigh In, a Sunday morning racing programme, airs on Trackside 2 and is hosted by Karen-Fenton Ellis.
- Live and repeated racing coverage airs from 11am.

== Stations ==
=== Radio frequencies ===
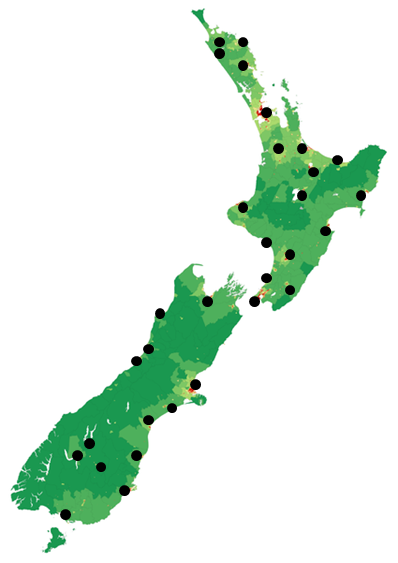
This is a map of TAB Trackside Radio frequencies.

These were the frequencies at the time of the April 2020 service suspension:

- Kaitaia - 92.4 FM
- Bay of Islands - 94.4 FM
- Kaikohe - 92.4 FM
- Whangārei - 92.4 FM
- Auckland - 1476 AM
- Waikato - 954 AM
- Tauranga - 873 AM
- Rotorua - 1548 AM
- Whakatāne - 96.1 FM
- Taupō - 91.2 FM
- Gisborne - 1485 AM
- Taranaki - 97.2 FM
- Hawke's Bay - 549 AM
- Wanganui/Manawatu - 828 AM
- Wairarapa - 91.1 FM
- Kāpiti Coast - 93.5 FM
- Wellington - 711 AM
- Nelson - 990 AM
- Westport - 93.3 FM
- Greymouth - 93.9 FM
- Hokitika - 89.1 FM
- Christchurch - 1260 AM
- Ashburton - 1071 AM
- Timaru - 1242 AM
- Oamaru - 89.6 FM
- Dunedin - 1206 AM
- Central Otago - 104.7 FM
- Wānaka - 106.8 LPFM
- Queenstown - 93.6 FM
- Invercargill - 1224 AM

=== Television channels ===
Trackside 1 broadcasts racing from all codes, both domestic and international, alongside specialist shows. TAB Trackside 2 broadcasts racing from all codes, alongside simulcasts of TAB Trackside Radio weekday mornings from 6am. In 2011, it live simulcast Fill the Basin, a February 2011 Christchurch earthquake fundraiser cricket match, with Canterbury Television. The channels area available on the Sky Television DHS encrypted satellite services (062 Trackside 1, 063 Trackside 2) and Freeview terrestrial and streaming services (023 Trackside 1, 024 Trackside 2
