= The Sound (radio station) =

- New Zealand
- Frequency: See Stations section

Programming
- Format: Classic rock of the 1960s–1980s (previously also the 1950s)

Ownership
- Owner: MediaWorks New Zealand

History
- First air date: 13 October 1997
- Former names: Solid Gold FM (1997-2011)

Links
- Webcast: Live stream
- Website: Official website

The Sound, previously known as Solid Gold FM, is a New Zealand radio network owned by MediaWorks New Zealand. Solid Gold began broadcasting on 13 October 1997 and was rebranded as The Sound on 1 January 2012. The Sound has a classic rock format, playing "the greatest music of all time" from the 1960s, 1970s and 1980s. The station appeals to an older audience than most popular and rock music stations in New Zealand.

== History ==
=== As Solid Gold FM ===
Solid Gold FM started in Auckland on 13 October 1997 broadcasting on 93.4FM. This frequency was previously used to broadcast Kool 93, a station that played a similar format to Solid Gold. After The Radio Network purchased Kool 93's parent company, Prospect Media Ltd, the Commerce Commission ruled that The Radio Network had to sell or dispose of some of their Auckland frequencies as a condition of the sale, and as a result they closed Kool 93, with the frequency going to Energy Enterprises.

For several months during 1997, 93.4FM was used to play temporary programme advising listeners of the launch of a new station coming soon. Solid Gold's original line up was Breakfast with Blackie and Jennifer (Kevin Black and Jenny Marcroft), Adam "Boom Boom" Butler (10 am - 2 pm), Big Tony Amos (2 pm - 7 pm) and Brian Staff (7 pm - midnight). Following the launch in Auckland, Energy Enterprises (which later became RadioWorks) rolled the station out across New Zealand as they were able to secure frequencies in each market. In some markets local stations were closed down and replaced with Solid Gold, as there were markets where RadioWorks had taken over more than one local station. Solid Gold was eventually available in 25 markets across New Zealand.

During the station's early days, the playlist featured mostly music from the 1950s and 1960s. Music from the 1950s was dropped in the early 2000s, with the station focusing on 1960s and 1970s music for most of the decade. The station has run several promotions sending listeners overseas, for example, to see Bruce Springsteen, to Graceland, 10 friends to Fiji, 10 friends to the Gold Coast, the 1000 Greatest Hits of the 60s and 70s countdown and more.

In 2009, long-term Breakfast host Kevin Black retired, and Blackie's Big Breakfast (featuring Alan (AJ) Whetton and David Burke-Kennedy) was replaced by Muzza in the Morning, with host Murray Inglis. A former breakfast host on Auckland's Radio Hauraki, Black was once the highest-paid private radio DJ in New Zealand. His 12-year spell with Solid Gold between 1997 and 2009 was his last on-air role until he died in 2013, just short of his 70th birthday. Murray Inglis left the breakfast show in late 2010 and was replaced by Mark McCarron.

From 25 December 2010 the station changed their positioning statement to "The Greatest Hits of all time", and no longer played only 1960s and 1970s music. Daytime announcer Macca, who had been with the station since 1998, had his last show with Solid Gold on 30 December 2011 and did not continue with The Sound. Afternoon host Rick Rennie and former night host Peter Dakin also left.

=== As The Sound ===
The station relaunched as The Sound at 9 am on 1 January 2012. The last song on Solid Gold FM was "A Change Is Gonna Come" by Sam Cooke. The first song played on The Sound, following a 5-minute profile intro, was Elton John's "Funeral for a Friend/Love Lies Bleeding". Breakfast host Mark McCarron hosted the first show on The Sound.

The Sound features a classic rock format, which broadcasts on all existing Solid Gold frequencies over the country. The change was made in response to competing stations Classic Hits and Radio Hauraki choosing to play newer music. The change fills the gap in 1970s and 1980s music no longer played by these stations.

Mark McCarron left the breakfast show in June 2014, to make way for The Kennedy and Staufer Breakfast with Mark Kennedy and Mark Staufer. Kennedy and Staufer were well known to Auckland listeners as the breakfast duo on Auckland's 89FM during the 1980s hosting a breakfast show called The Top Marks. The show was cancelled in July 2014, after co-host Mark Staufer reportedly used foul language during a late-night talkback slot he was co-hosting with Ian Wishart on Radio Live. The talkback slot also included frank and explicit discussion about masturbation and teenage abortion, with his co-host blaming his poor choice of words on tiredness. He immediately lost his place on the late-night talkback slot. The situation was reviewed by MediaWorks New Zealand management and the breakfast programme was cancelled just five weeks after it had begun. Following the cancellation of The Kennedy and Staufer Breakfast show Mark McCarron was reinstated as breakfast presenter with co-host Leah Panapa. Mark McCarron left the station at the end of 2015.

== Programmes ==
Breakfast The Morning Sound with Robert Taylor, Martin Devlin and Georgia Cubbon between 5:30 am and 10 am weekdays.

Workday The Sound Workday with Georgia Cubbon between 10 am and 2 pm weekdays.

Drive The Sound Drive with Mark Smith between 2 pm and 7 pm weekdays.

Nights Alice's Attic with Alice Cooper between 8 pm and midnight weeknights. Overnights are fully automated between midnight and 5 am the next morning.

Weekends Weekend shows presented by various announcers, including Gavin (Gav) Comber, Georgia Cubbon, Bob Gentil, John Markby, Mark Smith, Robert Taylor and Mark (Woodsie) Woods. Mark Smith hosts The Sound Going Underground between 6 pm and 8 pm Saturdays, followed by Classic Rock Party between 8 pm and midnight. Acoustic Sunrise runs between 5 am and 8 am Sundays.

== Stations ==
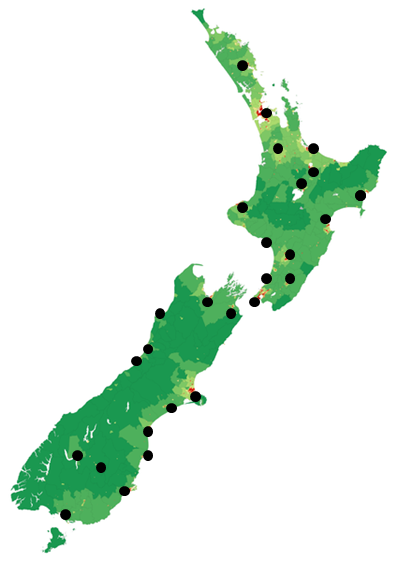
Map of The Sound stations operating in 2016

These are the frequencies for The Sound:

- Kerikeri - 92.0 FM
- Whangārei - Maungataniwha - 98.0 FM
- Rodney - Moirs Hill - 92.9 FM
- Auckland - Sky Tower - 93.8 FM
- Hamilton - Ruru - 93.8 FM
- Tauranga - Kopukairua - 92.6 FM
- Whakatāne - Putauaki - 105.7 FM
- Rotorua - Pukepoto - 91.1 FM
- Reporoa - Paeroa Range - 92.4 FM
- Gisborne - Wheatstone Road - 96.5 FM
- Taupō - Whakaroa - 100.0 FM
- Hawke's Bay - Kohinurākau (Mount Erin) - 91.9 FM
- Taranaki - Mount Taranaki - 98.0 FM
- Whanganui - Bastia Hill - 94.4 FM
- Manawatū - Wharite - 93.8 FM
- Wairarapa - Popoiti - 93.5 FM
- Kāpiti Coast - Forest Heights - 94.3 FM
- Wellington - Kaukau & Haywards - 97.3 FM
- Nelson - Grampians - 98.4 FM
- Marlborough - Wither Hills - 96.1 FM
- Christchurch - Sugarloaf - 92.9 FM
- Ashburton - Ashburton substation - 95.7 FM
- Timaru - 90.7 FM, Mount Horrible - 97.1 FM
- Fairlie - Mt Michael - 104.6 FM
- Oamaru - Cape Wanbrow - 99.2 FM
- Kurow - 105.6 FM
- Alexandra - Obelisk - 93.5 FM
- Wānaka - Mt Maude - 93.8 FM
- Queenstown - Peninsula Hill - 97.6 FM
- Otago - Mount Cargill - 90.2 FM
- Southland - Hedgehope - 98.0 FM

== Ratings ==
As of May 2025, The Sound has the sixth-highest share of the New Zealand commercial radio market at 5.9%.

The Sound commercial radio ratings (May 2025)
Market	Station share	Change	Rank
All markets	5.9	▲ +0.2	6
Auckland	3.9	no change	10
Christchurch	7.6	▲ +0.8	5
Wellington	5.7	▼ −0.4	6
Waikato	8.4	▲ +1.1	4
Tauranga	6.2	▼ −1.6	8
Manawatū	8.5	▲ +1.2	4
Hawke's Bay	5.7	▼ −0.2	8
Northland	5.7	▼ −0.9	4
Dunedin	9.0	▲ +1.4	2
Taranaki	7.7	▲ +1.1	6
Nelson	3.1	▲ +0.3	10
Southland	4.2	▼ −0.6	12
Rotorua	9.0	▲ +1.1	4
