= Radio in New Zealand =

Radio broadcasting began in New Zealand in 1922, and is now dominated by almost thirty radio networks and station groups. The Government has dominated broadcasting since 1925, but through privatisation and deregulation (in 1989) has allowed commercial talk and music stations to reach large audiences. New Zealand also has several radio stations serving Māori tribes, Pasifika communities, ethnic minorities, evangelical Christians and special interests.

State-owned broadcaster Radio New Zealand reaches the broadest range of listeners with bilingual flagship broadcaster Radio New Zealand National. Several previously state-owned radio brands like top-rating talk station Newstalk ZB are now owned by NZME Radio, which operates eight networks on terrestrial radio and iHeartRadio. Ten radio networks are operated by MediaWorks New Zealand, including top-rating music stations The Edge and The Rock. Independent stations like The SkiFM Network, 1XX and Coast FM continue to serve local communities, alongside low-powered and internet stations.

New Zealand was also one of the first countries to introduce Christian radio, with Rhema Media now operating three networks around the country. The Student Radio Network began with the start of bFM in 1969 and the first of the country's community access broadcasters was founded in 1981. Te Māngai Pāho funds Māori iwi radio stations, and the Pacific Media Network continues to receive Government support.

== History ==
=== Early radio ===
Radio stations in 1927

Professor Robert Jack made the first broadcast in New Zealand from the University of Otago physics department on 17 November 1921. The first radio station, Radio Dunedin, began broadcasting on 4 October 1922, but it was only in 1925 that the Radio Broadcasting Company (RBC) began broadcasts throughout New Zealand.

Call signs 1923–1988 Number – Letter – Letter
- Number: 1: Northland – Bay of Plenty; 2: Taranaki – Marlborough; 3: Canterbury – West Coast; 4: Otago – Southland
- Letters: X_: private station YA: mixed format / National; YC: fine music / Concert; Z_: public, commercial

Auckland Radio Service started broadcasting at 7:45pm on 13 April 1923 and 1YA was soon being heard on 4 evenings a week as far away as Dunedin. The government facilitated the creation of RBC and gave it a 5-year contract. Auckland Radio was then taken over by the Radio Broadcasting Company of New Zealand on 20 November 1925. A new studio, with a more powerful transmitter and 204 ft (62 m) mast, opened on 9 August 1926 in Newton and could be heard in Rarotonga. It cost about £8,500 and used a 500W International Western Electric Company transmitter, able to reach most of the country. RBC's similar 3YA in Christchurch started broadcasting on 1 September 1926. Its 2YA Wellington studio was officially opened on 16 July 1927. Listenership rose rapidly, from 3,588 licences in 1926 to 18,162 in 1927.

Stations in October 1927	Location	1st licence	Owner
1YA	Auckland	1923-05	RBC
1YB (later: 1ZB)	Auckland	1923-09	La Gloria Gramophone Co
1ZQ (formerly: 1YD, 1 YQ)	Auckland	1926-01	L.R. Keith
2YA (formerly: 2YB, 2YK)	Wellington	1923-08	RBC
2ZF (formerly: 2YF)	Palmerston North	1925-12	Palmerston North Radio Club
2ZM (formerly: 2YM; later: 2XM)	Gisborne	1923-10	Gisborne Radio Co
3YA (formerly: 3AC, 3AQ)	Christchurch	1923-08	RBC
3ZC	Christchurch	1927-02	Finemore Strachan Ltd
4YA (formerly: VLDN)	Dunedin	1923-08	RBC
4ZB (formerly: 4AB; later: 4ZD, 4XD)	Dunedin	1923-08	Otago Radio Association
4ZM	Dunedin	1927-10	J.D. McEwen
4ZL	Dunedin	1927-10	Radio Service Ltd

In addition to those stations, in 1923 there were also Auckland stations 1AA (C.N. Edwards), 1AB (V.J. Penny), 1AC (L.S. Spackman), 1AH (Hartle & Gray), 1AM (Hamilton Amateur Radio Club), 2YA (then owned by Wilkins & Field, Nelson), 2AB (D. Wilkinson, Motueka), Gisborne had 2AD (P.R. Stevens), 2AE (R.J. Patty), 2AF (W.J. Sinclair), 2AG (I.H. O'Meara), a 2AG station (L.K. Ewen) was also in Whanganui, as was 2AH (Whanganui Amateur Wireless Club), 2AI in Wellington (W.L. Harrison), 2AJ in Stratford (Bransgrove), 2AK (L. Rawson, Hāwera), 2AP (P. Collier, Brooklyn) 2YK (Dominion Radio, Wellington), 2XA (Experimental Station, Wellington), Christchurch stations 3AA (R.J. Orbell), 3AB (F. Vincent), 3AC (Radio Society), 3AF (L.F. Ball), Greymouth 3AD (R.G.F. Blake), 4AA (F.D. Bell, Palmerston), 4AC (R.E. Robinson, Dunedin), 4AD (A.E. Jordan, Invercargill), 4YA was then owned by British Electric Supply and, with 4YO (Radio Supply Company), also in Dunedin, and 1YA (then Auckland Radio Service) had the only three 500 watt transmitters in the country. Further stations in 1926 were 1YC (N.C. Shepherd, Whangārei), 1YD (L.R. Keith, Auckland) and 2YL (B. C. Spackman, Napier).

In 1930, station 1ZR began operating from the Queen Street premises of Lewis Eady Limited in Auckland. Pioneer broadcasters included Aunt Daisy, Dudley Wrathall and Rod Talbot. A "radio church", the 'Friendly Road', was run by 'Uncle Tom' Garland and the Reverend Colin Scrimgeour.

In 1932, RBC's assets were acquired by the government, which established the New Zealand Broadcasting Board (NZBB). This would later be replaced by the New Zealand National Broadcasting Service (NBS) and the National Commercial Broadcasting Service (NCBS). In the 1950s, these merged to become the New Zealand Broadcasting Service (NZBS), a government department. In 1962, this gave way to the New Zealand Broadcasting Corporation (NZBC), an independent public body modelled on the BBC in the UK.

Until the 1980s, stations used a series of New Zealand call signs, consisting of a single digit and two letters (see right). In addition to YA National programme stations, YC Concert programme stations and a limited number of privately owned X stations, several stations were operated commercially by the government. In each region, the largest city was assigned a ZB station (1ZB Auckland, 2ZB Wellington, 3ZB Christchurch and 4ZB Dunedin) and a ZM music station (1ZM Auckland, 2ZM Wellington and 3ZM Christchurch). The Newstalk ZB and ZM brands continue to be used by NZME (formerly The Radio Network). The second largest city was assigned a ZA station: 1ZA in Taupō, 2ZA in Palmerston North, 3ZA in Greymouth and 4ZA in Invercargill. In other towns and cities the final letter was assigned from the town or city name such as 4ZG in Gore and 1ZH in Hamilton. These ZA and other stations, also now owned by NZME, were rebranded as Classic Hits and rebranded again in 2014 as The Hits. 1YA, 2YK, 3AQ, 4YA were the first stations operating in the country's four main cities, and 5ZB was a mobile radio station broadcast in railway carriages during the 1940s.

As part of the Geneva Frequency Plan of 1975, the country switched from 10 kHz to 9 kHz channel spacing on the AM band on 23 November 1978.

The Government deregulated the broadcasting market in 1989, and the number of private stations grew exponentially as a result. Most were locally owned and operated, but eventually became part of the Mediaworks group of stations, and by 2004 the majority of former privately owned stations had been rebranded (see below) and owned by the one company.

=== FM broadcasting ===
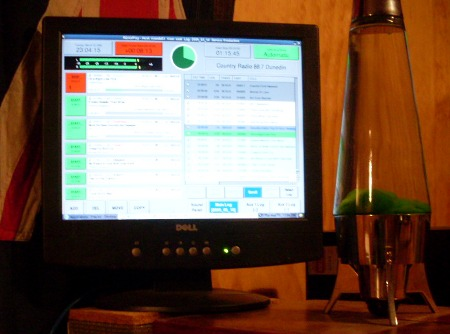
The studio computer of Dunedin's Country Radio

New Zealand's original FM broadcasting allocation, when FM frequencies were first allocated around 1981 until 1986 was 89.0 to 94.0 MHz, and then from 1986, until 2000 was 89.0 to 100.0 MHz. Meanwhile, the segments of the band not used for FM broadcasting, such as the band above 100 MHz had been allocated to land-based AM mobile radio-telephone users (taxis, fire and others), an allocation that dates back to the late 1950s. Prior to the allocation of FM radio frequencies for broadcasting, the entire 88 to 108 MHz band was allocated to land mobile two way radio communications. New Zealand's FM frequency allocation issue was not fixed until the late 1990s, after those users had been progressively reassigned channels elsewhere, when the band was expanded to the full 20.5 MHz. New Zealand now uses the standard global allocation of 87.5–108 MHz for FM. Today, full-power FM stations use frequencies between 88.6 MHz and 106.5 MHz, although the band between 101.8 MHz and 103.3 MHz is allocated to future government, Maori and Pacific Island services. Auckland based 531PI commenced transmission on 102.2 FM on April 16, 2026, to the greater Auckland region. Low-power FM stations use frequencies from 87.6 MHz to 88.3 MHz and from 106.7 MHz to 107.7 MHz. New Zealand permits Radio Data System subcarriers, Radio NZ National uses RDS for its FM network with AF (Alternative Frequency) enabled, commercial radio use of RDS for station identification and program information is widespread.

The first station to broadcast on FM in New Zealand was a temporary station in Whakatāne called FM 90.7. The station ran from 5 January 1982 until 31 January 1982. The first permanent station in New Zealand to broadcast on FM was Magic 91FM in Auckland broadcasting on 91.0FM followed by 89 Stereo FM broadcasting on 89.4FM. Both stations are no longer in operation; Magic 91 is the local Auckland frequency for ZM and 89 Stereo FM today broadcasts a simulcasted FM version of Newstalk ZB. Radio New Zealand started broadcasting on FM in the early 1980s and most networks now broadcast on FM. On 22 February 1982, Victoria University of Wellington's student station Radio Active became the first station in Wellington to legally broadcast on FM.

=== Pirate radio ===
From 1966, Radio Hauraki broadcast from the MV Tiri that was moored in international waters near Auckland, and in 1968 from the MV Tiri II. This was the only ship-based pirate station to ever broadcast in the Southern Hemisphere which it did for 1,111 days, although it was subsequently discovered that the ship had always been moored in the New Zealand territorial waters off the Hauraki Gulf.

In 1970 it was granted a licence to broadcast from land and a successor company still broadcasts to the Auckland market under the Radio Hauraki brand and is networked nationwide. In 1972, Radio Bosom broadcast briefly until Post Office inspectors found and seized the transmitter which was concealed in a maintenance tunnel under a University of Auckland building. Now known as 95bFM, the station broadcasts legally from the University of Auckland student union building.

Kiwi Radio began broadcasting as 4YZW on 1977, and as WKNZ on the medium wave band in 1978. On 25 March 1980 they launched a pirate Radio Freedom broadcast on both shortwave and FM. In 1983, the name was changed to Kiwi Radio, due to not wanting to be confused with the many other stations named Radio Freedom. Kiwi Radio was known to relay other pirates, such as some from Australia, before it ceased broadcasting in 1997. In 2013, Radio Totse began broadcasting on shortwave to North America on 6.925 MHz.

== Public radio ==
=== Radio New Zealand ===
Radio New Zealand is a New Zealand's state-owned national public service radio broadcasting service. It was formed in 1925, and took on its modern form under the Radio New Zealand Act 1995. The broadcaster is bound by the Charter and Operating Principles included in the Act, which is reviewed by the New Zealand Parliament every five years and was last amended in 2004. The broadcaster is required to provoke debate and critical thought, reflect New Zealand and Māori cultural diversity, cater for varied ages and interests, promote music and drama and create a sense of national identity. It is also a Civil Defence broadcaster.

Radio New Zealand National, formerly National Radio, is Radio New Zealand's general public service broadcaster. It broadcasts flagship news programmes like Morning Report, Midday Report and Checkpoint, alongside morning show Nine to Noon, afternoon show The Panel and a range of interviews and magazine programmes. Radio New Zealand Concert is FM radio network broadcasting classical, jazz, and rock music and regular news updates. The playlist is among the most diverse and eclectic of the world's state run classical music networks. Other services offered by Radio New Zealand include the Radio New Zealand International Pacific shortwave service, the AM Network Parliamentary broadcaster and The Wireless youth website.

=== Iwi Radio Network ===
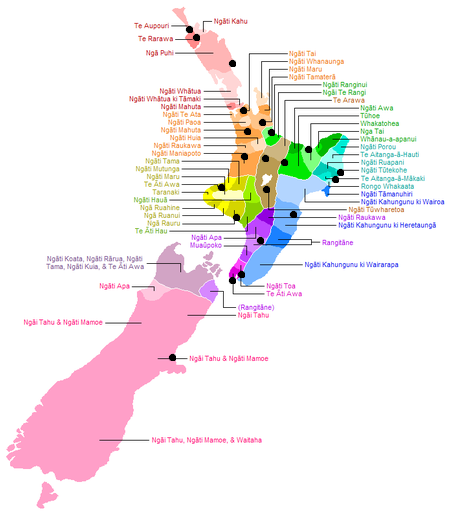
The distribution of iwi radio stations and the location of tribal areas

Te Whakaruruhau o Ngā Reo Irirangi Māori is a Māori radio network of bilingual English and Māori language radio stations serving local Māori iwi through local frequencies and online streaming. The individual stations are all funded by and accountable to Te Māngai Pāho. They broadcast national and local news coverage, music, educational programming, comedy, drama and programmes that teach the Māori language, with local personalities, community shows and shared network programmes.

=== Pacific Media Network ===
The Pacific Media Network is a pan-Pasifika national broadcasting group owned and operated by the National Pacific Radio Trust and funded by New Zealand on Air. It has a legislative role of serving Pacific peoples and communities in English and ten Pacific languages, in a way that shapes the country's national identity. It also aims to "empower, encourage and nurture Pacific cultural identity and economic prosperity in New Zealand, to celebrate the Pacific spirit". Its primary source of income is a $3.25 million annual grant from the Government. Pacific Media includes the nationwide Niu FM radio network set up in 2002, the Auckland-based Radio 531pi station launched in 1993, and the independent Pacific Radio News service.

=== Access Radio Network ===
The Association of Community Access Broadcasters represents the twelve community radio stations set-up between 1981 and 2010 which have received government funding since 1989. They broadcast community programming and provide facilities, training and on-air time for individuals and community groups to produce programming. The stations are also required to represent particular religions, cultures, languages, ages and sexualities. There are currently local access stations in Auckland, Waikato, Taranaki, Hawke's Bay, Manawatū, Wairarapa, Kapiti, Wellington, Nelson, Canterbury, Otago and Southland.

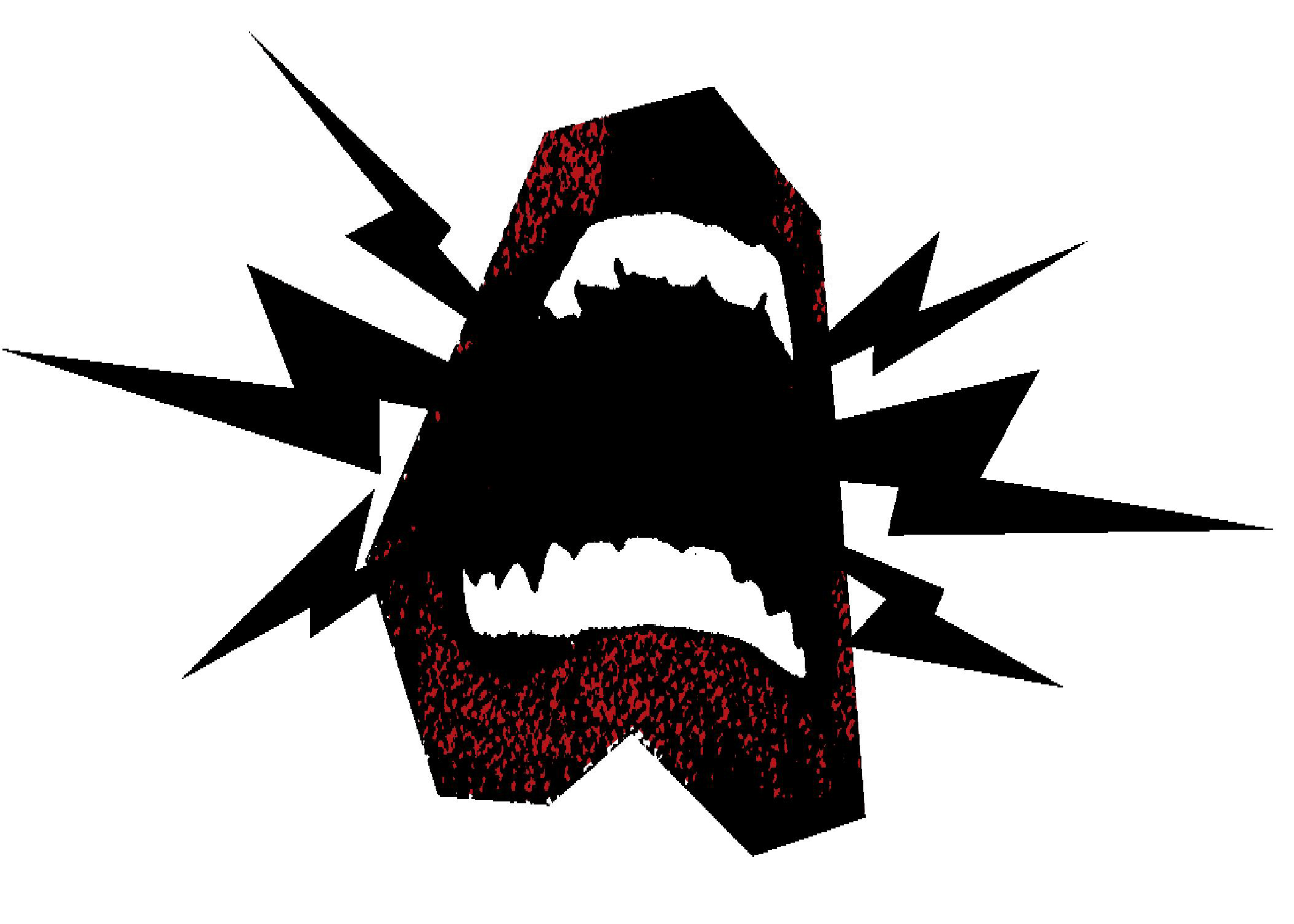
SRN Logo

=== Student Radio Network (SRN) ===
The Student Radio Network (known as bNet between 1998 and 2009) is a loose grouping of the current and former student radio stations consisting of:

- Radio One in Dunedin, owned by Otago University Students Association
- RDU in Christchurch, associated with the University of Canterbury
- Radio Active in Wellington, associated with Victoria and Massey Universities
- Radio Control in Palmerston North, owned by Te Tira Ahu Pae Massey University Students Association
- 95bFM in Auckland, associated with Auckland University

These radio stations broadcast local independent news and current affairs, and have provided a platform for new or independent New Zealand artists. The network has co-operated on advertising sales, collaborated on ideas and shared original programming. Some stations are run by student associations while others are owned by independent non-profit trusts. The 2011 Canterbury earthquake and the introduction of voluntary student membership have raised fresh concerns about the future of student broadcasting, but the role of the stations continues to be recognised by New Zealand on Air and the Ministry for Culture and Heritage.

The network began as a grouping of university student radio stations in major centres, and for a while operated as a commercial network of student union stations and former student union stations in six markets. In 1986 member station Radio One launched the Rad-One Card, a low-cost discount and loyalty card with on-air competitions, to raise funds. Similar schemes have now been launched by other stations, such as the Active card by Radio Active and the bCard by bFM and Bank of New Zealand.

The SRN adopted the name bNet for over a decade, using the brand of Auckland member station bFM, and held the bNet NZ Music Awards between 1998 and 2007 to promote the role the stations played in fostering New Zealand music across genres. However, the group agreed to change its name back to Student Radio Network at a meeting in 2009, to reflect the broader range of student radio brands. The stations continue to provide a spotlight for local bands, having previously helped promote Fat Freddys Drop, Kora, Jordan Reyne, Dimmer, Jet Jaguar, Shocking Pinks, The Enright House and some underground and electronica acts.

The Student Radio Network now organises the Aotearoa Alternative Awards, which is an annual event celebrating music in New Zealand, as well as the weekly SRN Top 10.

== Private radio ==
=== New Zealand Media and Entertainment ===
New Zealand Media and Entertainment is one of New Zealand's largest radio companies. It was formed in 2014 through the formal merger of The Radio Network and the New Zealand assets of APN News & Media, which includes magazines and newspapers like The New Zealand Herald. The Radio Network, in turn, began when the commercial radio activities of Radio New Zealand were sold-off in 1996, putting the Sports Roundup service and the Newstalk ZB, Classic Hits and ZM networks into entirely private ownership.

The company now runs talk radio network Newstalk ZB and sports radio network Radio Sport alongside music networks Radio Hauraki, Coast, Flava, The Hits and Mix. Privately owned Gore station Hokonui Gold is operated by NZME under a long-term lease contract.

=== MediaWorks New Zealand ===
MediaWorks New Zealand operates ten radio brands, these used to operate alongside its former television brands, TV3 and FOUR. It was formed in 2004 when CanWest Global Communications combined television company TV3 Network Services and radio company RadioWorks, to sell-down its shares in the company on the NZSX and sell its remaining stake to Ironbridge Capital. MediaWorks has continued to face ongoing financial difficulties, requiring a $43 million loan from the Government in 2011 before briefly going into receivership in 2013. Since Mark Weldon took charge of the company in August 2014, it has outlined plans for greater integration between radio and television. This includes the planned introduction of a combined news service, NewsHub, in 2016.

Since its inception in 2004, MediaWorks has relaunched local heritage stations to its adult contemporary More FM and easy listening The Breeze brands, reducing or removing local programming. Its other music brands include The Edge, The Rock and The Sound. It has rolled out new talk radio network Radio Live and local music station Kiwi FM, converted Radio Pacific to LiveSport, and purchased brands Mai FM and George FM. MediaWorks affiliates include Times FM in Orewa, Coromandel FM on the Coromandel Peninsula, Radio Dunedin in Otago and Port FM in Timaru.

=== Rhema Media ===
Rhema Media is the country's largest Christian media organisation, and a major New Zealand radio company. Christchurch evangelist Richard Berry first proposed Radio Rhema in the 1960s, and it began permanently broadcasting in 1976. Rhema Media is the founding organisation of United Christian Broadcasters and provides the model of broadcasting for member organisations in other countries. For example, Australia's Rhema FM is modelled on New Zealand's Rhema.

The organisation is predominantly funded by donations, and operates young-oriented Life FM, family-oriented Rhema and Star for older listeners. The future of some of its networks was brought into question in 2010, when the Government required Rhema Media to raise 6.4 million dollars to renew its commercial radio frequencies for the following two decades.

=== Brian FM ===
Broadcasting to Christchurch, Marlborough, Nelson, Whanganui, Taihape, Timaru, Oamaru, Ashburton, Alexandra, and Cromwell. The station does not use DJs, instead plays music with short ad-libbed commercials.

=== Low power and amateur ===
Low power broadcasting licences in New Zealand are issued by Radio Spectrum Management and managed by the Ministry of Business, Innovation and Employment. In many cases, they provide community groups with easy access to broadcasting. Any resident is allowed a free licence at a maximum of 1 watt EIRP in the FM guardbands from 87.6 to 88.3 and from 106.7 to 107.7 MHz under a General User Radio licence (GURL). Some frequency restrictions apply to areas under the flight paths into Auckland Airport and Wellington Airport to minimise interference with the airports' instrument landing systems (which operate on 109.9 MHz and 110.3 MHz). Prior to June 2010, the lower band was located between 88.1 and 88.8 and a maximum of 500 mW EIRP allowed. Broadcasters on these frequencies are required to cease operations if they interfere with other, licensed broadcasters and have no protection from interference from other licensed or unlicensed broadcasters. Contact details must also be broadcast every hour.

One licensee may operate two transmitters anywhere (close together), but a third transmitter must be at least 25 km away from at least one of the first two transmitters. Radio Inspectors regularly monitor and make random unannounced visits to broadcasters, and will impose fines for violations of the regulations. New broadcasters are also subject to an initial compulsory inspection. The high cost of frequencies in Auckland, Wellington and Christchurch makes low-power broadcasting particularly popular in these markets.

== Radio markets ==
Radio stations by region
- Regions of New Zealand
- Northland – Auckland – Waikato – Bay of Plenty – Gisborne – Hawke's Bay – Taranaki – Manawatū-Whanganui – Wellington – Tasman – Nelson – Marlborough – West Coast – Canterbury – Otago – Southland

Radio stations in New Zealand include some network stations and a number of predominantly low-power stations that operate in a single market. Auckland, Wellington and Christchurch are the largest commercial radio markets, surveyed four times a year by GfK New Zealand. Between 1991 and 2015, the survey was conducted by TNS New Zealand. Smaller markets like Waikato receive four surveys a year as well, but the data is an average of the past four quarters, as opposed to isolated quarterly results in the major markets.

Radio New Zealand networks do not participate in commercial market surveys, meaning they are not included in listener numbers and are not counted in market share. However, a Nielsen Media Research survey commissioned by Radio New Zealand suggests its National and Concert stations reach a combined audience of 563,000 unique listeners. The National programme reaches 503,000, or 14 percent of the 15+ population, giving it 10.2 percent station share. The Concert programme reaches 138,000 or 4 percent of the 15+ population, with an estimated market share of 1.4 percent. Commercial radio surveys, by comparison, are based on listeners 10+.

Major radio markets in New Zealand (May 2025)
Rank	Market	Potential audience	Top station		Second station		Third station	
Rank	Market	Potential audience	Station	Share	Station	Share	Station	Share
1	Auckland	1,558,000	Newstalk ZB	14.6	Mai FM	10.8	The Breeze	9.0
2	Christchurch	546,200	Newstalk ZB	15.3	The Breeze	11.9	More FM	11.2
3	Wellington	392,500	Newstalk ZB	16.3	The Breeze	13.6	The Rock / ZM (tie)	8.3
4	Waikato	314,800	Newstalk ZB	13.9	The Rock	11.9	ZM	9.9
5	Tauranga	201,400	Newstalk ZB	16.0	Coast	8.4	Channel X	8.1
6	Manawatū	157,000	Newstalk ZB	12.7	Magic	9.8	The Breeze	8.7
7	Hawke's Bay	142,200	Newstalk ZB	14.8	Magic	12.4	The Breeze	10.6
8	Northland	126,200	Coast	15.3	More FM	15.0	Newstalk ZB	9.9
9	Dunedin	119,000	Newstalk ZB	13.3	The Sound	9.0	The Breeze	8.6
10	Taranaki	114,800	Newstalk ZB	13.2	The Rock	11.9	Magic	11.2
11	Nelson	92,600	Newstalk ZB	11.7	The Breeze	10.6	The Edge	9.5
12	Southland	84,500	The Rock	17.6	More FM	11.8	Magic	11.4
13	Rotorua	59,600	The Breeze	12.8	Flava	10.7	Magic	9.4

=== Auckland ===
Auckland is the country's largest radio market. Surveys are conducted four times a year to garner the listener habits of more than 1.2 million people who live in Auckland's urban centres. Due in part to high levels of peak hour commuter traffic congestion, 74.6 percent listen to the radio on a weekly basis. Newstalk ZB has maintained a long-running first place in the ratings under successive breakfast hosts Paul Holmes and Mike Hosking, with a 13.4 percent station share and a weekly cumulative audience of 178,000 listeners in the latest Q2-14 survey for August to September 2014.

The Edge has 7.7 percent share and 169,200 listeners; ZM has 4.5 percent share and 136,900 listeners; The Breeze has 7.8 percent share and 136,200 listeners; Mai FM has 5.2 percent share and 126,200 listeners; and Coast has 7.8 percent share and 105,400 listeners. Radio Live, The Hits, The Sound, The Rock, George FM, More FM, Flava and Radio Hauraki all maintain audiences over 50,000. Radio Sport, the BBC World Service and Hindi station Radio Tarana also have audiences above 30,000.

=== Wellington ===
The Wellington market covers an area of around 335,000 people, where 64.1 percent of people listen to commercial radio during the week. Despite the absence of former local breakfast duo Polly and Grant, ZM continues to lead the ratings with around 42,000 listeners each week and 6.7 percent market share.

Newstalk ZB has local news and a local morning programme, has the highest market share at 14.5 percent, and has around 34,000 listeners. Long-running and predominantly local station The Breeze has 12.7 percent station share and over 38,000 listeners. The Hits and The Edge also have more than 30,000 listeners and more than 7 percent market share.

=== Christchurch ===
Around 1,500 people are surveyed for the Christchurch market, in which 72.8 percent of the population of 365,000 people are radio listeners. Under breakfast hosts Simon Barnett and Gary McCormick, More FM consistently leads the ratings with around 70,000 listeners. Newstalk ZB maintains the highest market share at 15.3 percent, with nearly 56,000 listeners. Its local news and morning programme provide a particular focus on the issues that have followed the 2010 Canterbury earthquake.

The Breeze has 57,000 listeners and 9.9 percent station share; The Sound has 44,000 listeners and 9.1 percent station share; and The Edge, The Rock and ZM also have more than 30,000 listeners and more than 3 percent station share.

=== Other survey markets ===
The largest of New Zealand's provincial markets is Waikato, in which there are 227,000 people and 79.7 percent of people listen to the radio each week. Locally founded The Edge has the most listeners at 47,000, followed by ZM with 44,000 listeners. Partly local The Hits has 12.2 percent market share and 33,000 listeners, just ahead of locally founded The Rock with 12.1 percent market share and 32,000 listeners.

Three other markets also cover the upper North Island. Northland covers 112,000 people, with More FM reaching 27,000 listeners and 17.3 percent market share. Tauranga covers 136 thousand people, with Coast reaching 23,000 listeners and 15 percent market share. Only 47,000 people live in the Rotorua market, where Flava leads with 8,000 listeners and Coast has 16.6 percent market share.

In the central North Island, Taranaki includes a population of 84,000 people, with The Edge attracting 21,000 listeners and The Hits securing 13.8 percent market share. The Hawke's Bay market includes 107,000 people, with 23,000 listeners tuning into The Edge and Newstalk ZB maintaining 15.6 percent market share. Manawatū has a radio market of 97,000, with 18 thousand listening The Edge and 15 percent of market share going to The Rock.

On the South Island, the Nelson market includes 61,000 people, with 15,000 people listening to The Edge and 15 percent of market share going to Coast. Dunedin includes 102,000 people, with 19,000 listening to The Edge, 16,000 listening to The Hits and Radio Dunedin maintaining a 14.8 percent market share. Southland covers 68,000 people, including 14,000 listening to The Edge. Market share is heavily contested with Coast securing around 16.5 percent and The Rock securing 15 percent.

=== Non-survey markets ===
There are several radio markets that are not recognised by commercial surveys, but in which there is still competition between commercial radio stations such as Newstalk ZB. These include Tokoroa and Taupō in the Waikato and the Kāpiti Coast in Wellington. Others include Blenheim in Marlborough, Greymouth on the West Coast, Ashburton and Timaru in Canterbury, and Oamaru, Alexandra, and Queenstown in Otago.

== See also ==
- List of radio stations in New Zealand
- List of New Zealand radio station callsigns
- The Platform
