= List of radio stations in New Zealand =

The following is a list of radio stations in New Zealand.

== New Zealand network stations ==
Several networks operate across multiple centres or nationwide. Most have resulted from the consolidation of a group of existing stations and many have changed their name over time. The Sound was previously Solid Gold. TAB Trackside, suspended operations 12 April 2020, was previously LiveSport, BSport and Radio Pacific. SENZ launched on 19 July 2021 on the former TAB Trackside frequencies, and was replaced by Sport Nation on 19 November 2024. Mix (formerly Mix 98.2), was a reincarnation of Easy Mix, Viva and Easy Listening, and Radio Sport was replaced by Gold on 1 July 2020. The now-defunct Kiwi FM was previously Channel Z. The Wolf and Today FM (formerly Magic Talk and Radio Live) were closed.

Name	Owner	Current format	Local break-outs
AM Network	Radio New Zealand	Legislature broadcasts	Relay stations
Brian FM	Brian FM Ltd	Adult contemporary/Classic rock	
Channel X	MediaWorks	Classic alternative	0 hours
Coast	NZME	Classic hits	0 hours min
Flava	NZME	Urban contemporary	0 hours min
George FM	MediaWorks	Dance radio	0 hours min
Gold	NZME	Greatest hits & Sports radio	
Hokonui	NZME	Full service	
iHeartCountry New Zealand	NZME	Country radio	
Iwi Radio Network	Various	Full service	Local stations
Life FM	Rhema Media	Christian contemporary hit radio	0 hours min
Magic	MediaWorks	Oldies	0 hours min
Mai FM	MediaWorks	Urban contemporary	0 hours min
More FM	MediaWorks	Adult contemporary music	65 hours max
Newstalk ZB	NZME	Talk radio	23.5 hours max
PMN 531	Pacific Media Network	Urban contemporary	42 hours max
Radio Hauraki	NZME	Active rock/Alternative	0 hours min
RNZ Concert	Radio New Zealand	Classical music	Relay stations
RNZ National	Radio New Zealand	Public radio	Relay stations
Rhema	Rhema Media	Christian adult contemporary music	0 hours min
Ski FM Network	Central Media Group	Contemporary hit radio	0 hours min
Sport Nation rebranded from SENZ	Entain New Zealand Ltd	Sports radio	
Sanctuary rebranded from Star	Rhema Media	Christian classic hits	0 hours min
The Breeze	MediaWorks	Easy listening	89 hours max
The Edge	MediaWorks	Contemporary hit radio	0 hours min
The Hits	NZME	Adult contemporary music	45 hours max
The Rock	MediaWorks	Active rock	0 hours min
The Sound	MediaWorks	Classic rock	0 hours min
ZM	NZME	Contemporary hit radio	0 hours min

== Local FM/AM/Internet stations ==
Regions of New Zealand			Survey markets	Total population
Regions of New Zealand	1	List of radio stations in Northland	Northland	201,100
Regions of New Zealand	2	List of radio stations in Auckland	Auckland	1,816,000
Regions of New Zealand	3	List of radio stations in Waikato	Hamilton	532,100
Regions of New Zealand	4	List of radio stations in Bay of Plenty	Tauranga, Rotorua	351,500
Regions of New Zealand	5	List of radio stations in Gisborne	None	52,700
Regions of New Zealand	6	List of radio stations in Hawke's Bay	Hawke's Bay	179,700
Regions of New Zealand	7	List of radio stations in Taranaki	Taranaki	130,300
Regions of New Zealand	8	List of radio stations in Manawatu-Wanganui	Manawatu	260,700
Regions of New Zealand	9	List of radio stations in Wellington	Wellington	543,400
Regions of New Zealand	10,11	List of radio stations in Nelson and Tasman	Nelson	59,900
Regions of New Zealand	12	List of radio stations in Marlborough	None	50,800
Regions of New Zealand	13	List of radio stations in West Coast	None	34,700
Regions of New Zealand	14	List of radio stations in Canterbury	Christchurch	698,200
Regions of New Zealand	15	List of radio stations in Otago	Dunedin	253,900
Regions of New Zealand	16	List of radio stations in Southland	Southland	104,800

== See also ==
- Call signs in New Zealand
