= List of radio stations in Bay of Plenty =

This is a list of radio stations in Bay of Plenty in New Zealand. Most Bay of Plenty stations broadcast from Tauranga, Rotorua and Whakatāne.

== Western Bay of Plenty ==
=== FM stations ===
Frequency (MHz)	Name	Format	Owner	Transmitter	Effective power (kW)	Broadcasting on frequency since	Previous stations on frequency
88.6	The Edge	Contemporary hit radio	MediaWorks	Tauranga Kopukairua No.3	0.8	11 January 2021	2015–2021: Magic Music (moved to 99.8 MHz)
89.0	Licence previously cancelled/expired					One Double X, Te Puke; 92.9 Kiwi FM	
89.4	ZM	Contemporary hit radio	NZME	Tauranga Kopukairua	3.2	1997	Station broadcast on 89.8 MHz prior to 2010
90.2	Newstalk ZB	Talk radio	NZME	Tauranga Kopukairua	1.6		
91.0	Radio Hauraki	Active rock	NZME	Tauranga Kopukairua	0.8	16 July 2007	Station broadcast on 89.0 MHz prior to 2007; 1997 – 2007 Radio Sport
91.8	The Heat	Urban adult contemporary	Te Arawa Communications	Tauranga Maketu	0.32	July 2025	2021 – July 2025: Te Arawa FM
92.6	The Sound	Classic rock	MediaWorks	Tauranga Kopukairua	4	2012	1993 – 1994 Classic Rock 92.5FM; 1994–1997 Classic Rock 92FM; 1997 – 2012: Solid Gold
93.4	More FM	Adult contemporary music	MediaWorks	Tauranga Kopukairua	1.6	Dec 2004	1990–2004 Coastline FM
94.2	The Rock	Active rock	MediaWorks	Tauranga Kopukairua	3.2	1996	
94.6	Life FM	Contemporary Christian music	Rhema Media	Te Aroha	80	1997	
95.0	The Hits	Adult contemporary music	NZME	Tauranga Kopukairua	3.2	2014	Feb 1961 – 1980s: 1ZD (broadcast on 1000 AM prior to 1978 and moved to 1008 AM since); 1980s – 1990: Radio BOP; 1990 – 1993: BOP FM; 1993 – 2008: Classic Hits 95 BOP FM; 2008 – 2014: Classic Hits 95FM
95.8	The Breeze	Easy Listening	MediaWorks	Tauranga Kopukairua	4	11 June 2007	Broadcast on 96.1 MHz prior to 2010; Sep 1991 – 2005: Radio Pacific; 2005 – 2007: Radio Live
96.6	Mai FM	Urban contemporary	MediaWorks	Tauranga Kopukairua No.3	0.8	Mar 2010	
97.4	Coast	Easy listening	NZME	Tauranga Kopukairua	1.6	2004	Broadcast on 97.3 MHz prior to 2010
98.2	Moana Radio	Urban contemporary & Iwi radio	Moana Communications	Tauranga Kopukairua	0.8		Formerly Tahi 98.2FM
99.0	Flava	Urban contemporary	NZME	Tauranga Kopukairua	4	9 May 2025	1997–1998 Triple X 99FM; 2000–2012 Easy Listening i99FM, Viva (from 2005), Easy Mix (from 2007); 2012–2018 Radio Sport, Flava; 2018–2020 Mix; 2020–2025 Gold
99.8	Breeze Classic	1970s	MediaWorks	Tauranga Kopukairua	4	11 November 2025	99.8 Cadbury Moro FM (Summer of 92/93); Mix 100FM until April 1997; 1997–2021: The Edge (moved to 88.6 MHz); 11 January 2021 – 31 October 2025: Magic
100.6	Channel X	Classic alternative	MediaWorks	Tauranga Kopukairua	4	8 May 2023	2013 – Jan 2019: Radio Live; 2019 – 20 March 2022: Magic Talk; 21 March 2022 – 30 March 2023: Today FM
101.4	RNZ National	Public radio	RNZ	Tauranga Kopukairua	8	Nov 2019	
104.6	Rhema	Christian radio	Rhema Media	Tauranga Kopukairua	8		
105.4	Radio Aotearoa	Contemporary hit radio	Irirangi Tauranga Moana Ltd	Tauranga Kopukairua No.3	8	2023	BOP 105.4 FM until 2011; Boly BOP until 13 February 2016; 2016: Paradise FM; Aug 2017 – May 2023: The Station

=== AM stations ===
Frequency (kHz)	Name	Format	Owner	Transmitter	Broadcasting on frequency since	Previous stations on frequency
540	Sanctuary	Christian radio	Rhema Media	Tauranga Maketu	14 February 2025	6 April 2022 – 14 February 2025: Star; Rhema
657	AM Network (Parliament) and Sanctuary	Parliament Public radio and Christian radio	RNZ and Rhema Media	Tauranga Paengaroa		
819	RNZ National	Public radio	RNZ	Tauranga Paengaroa		
873	Sport Nation	Sports radio	Entain New Zealand Ltd	Tauranga Matapihi	19 November 2024	2005 – 2020: Radio Pacific, BSport, LiveSport, TAB Trackside Radio, SENZ
1008	Newstalk ZB	Talk radio	NZME	Tauranga Paengaroa	1993	Broadcast on 1000 kHz AM prior to 1978; Feb 1961–1980s: 1ZD; 1980s–1990: Radio BOP; 1990–1993: Easy BOP AM
1107	Radio Spice	Punjabi Radio		Tauranga Maketu	16 September 2024	Radio Live; 2019 – 20 March 2022: Magic Talk; 21 March 2022 – Feb 2023: Today FM on 100.6 MHz FM
1368	Village Radio 1XT	20s–80s	Tauranga Village Radio Museum Inc	Tauranga		
1440	Moana Radio	Simulcast 98.2 MHz FM		Tauranga Matapihi		
1521	iHeartCountry	Country music	NZME	Tauranga Matapihi	4 May 2026	Goodtime Classics, 1XTR, Talk Radio Bay of Plenty; 16/07/2007-30/03/2020: Radio Sport; 30/03/2020-30/06/2020: Newstalk ZB; 01/07/2020-04/05/2026: Gold Sport

=== Low-power FM stations ===
Frequency (MHz)	Name	Format	Owner	Transmitter	Broadcasting on frequency since	Previous stations on frequency
87.6	BollyBop	Indian		Tauranga		
87.8	Gaia FM	World music, Smooth Jazz		Tauranga		
88.1				Katikati		His FM
88.1	Valley FM 88.1	Oldies		Tauranga		
88.3	Sub FM		Toi Ohomai Institute of Technology	Tauranga		
88.3	Capital FM Te Puke	Local Community radio		Te Puke		
107.0	Capital FM Te Puke	Local Community radio		Te Puke		
107.1	Gaia FM	World music & Smooth jazz radio		Tauranga		
107.4	George FM	Dance music		Tauranga		
107.7	Sub FM		Toi Ohomai Institute of Technology	Windermere, Tauranga		
107.7	The Vibe	Dance, Urban & Indie music		Mt Maunganui		

== Rotorua ==
=== FM stations ===
Frequency (MHz)	Name	Format	Owner	Transmitter	Effective power (kW)	Broadcasting on frequency since	Previous stations on frequency
88.7	Te Arawa FM	Adult contemporary music & Iwi radio	Te Arawa Communications	Rotorua Tihiotonga	0.8		
89.2	More FM	Adult contemporary music	MediaWorks	Reporoa Paeroa Range	0.125		
89.5	Flava	Urban contemporary	NZME	Rotorua Pukepoto	1		
90.3	RNZ Concert	Classical music	RNZ	Rotorua Tihiotonga	0.8		
90.8	The Hits	Adult contemporary music	NZME	Reporoa Paeroa Range	0.32		
91.1	The Sound	Classic rock	MediaWorks	Rotorua Pukepoto	1		Solid Gold
91.9	The Breeze	Easy listening	MediaWorks	Rotorua Pukepoto	0.63	28 July 2008	Oct 1991 – 2005: Radio Pacific; 2005 – 2008: Radio Live
92.4	The Sound	Classic rock	MediaWorks	Reporoa Paeroa Range	0.1		
92.7	The Rock	Active rock	MediaWorks	Rotorua Pukepoto	1	1998	
93.5	Rhema	Christian radio	Rhema Media	Rotorua Te Waerenga Rd	1		
93.9	The Heat	Urban adult contemporary	Te Arawa Communications	Rotoiti Pikiao Marae Access Road	0.4		
94.3	Newstalk ZB	Talk radio	NZME	Rotorua Pukepoto	1	June 2025	Mix; 2019/20 – June 2025: Radio Hauraki moved to 87.8 MHz
95.1	Channel X	Classic alternative	MediaWorks	Rotorua Pukepoto	1	8 May 2023	2010 – Jan 2019: Radio Live; 2019 – 20 March 2022: Magic Talk; 21 March 2022 – 30 March 2023: Today FM
95.9	More FM	Adult contemporary music	MediaWorks	Rotorua Pukepoto	1.6	1988	Lakes FM
96.7	Coast	Easy listening	NZME	Rotorua Pukepoto	1	28 July 2008	2007 – May 2008: Mai FM; May 2008 – 28 July 2008: The Breeze
97.5	The Hits	Adult contemporary	NZME	Rotorua Pukepoto	1	1988	Classic Hits 97FM; Radio Geyserland
98.0	The Rock	Active rock	MediaWorks	Reporoa Paeroa Range	0.1	Aug 2024	2010 – Jan 2019: Radio Live; 2019 – 20 March 2022: Magic Talk; 21 March 2022 – 30 March 2023: Today FM; May 2023 – Aug 2024 Mai FM
98.3	ZM	Contemporary hit radio	NZME	Rotorua Pukepoto	1	1998	Classic Rock
99.1	The Heat	Urban adult contemporary	Te Arawa Communications	Rotorua Tihiotonga	0.25	April 2015	Mai FM; The Pulse; Triple X 99FM; Talk Radio Bay of Plenty; Rock 99FM; Urban FM
99.9	The Edge	Contemporary hit radio	MediaWorks	Rotorua Pukepoto	1	1998	
100.7	Breeze Classic	1970s	MediaWorks	Rotorua Pukepoto	1	1 November 2025	20 April 2015 – 31 October 2025: Magic
101.5	RNZ National	Public radio	RNZ	Rotorua Tihiotonga	0.32		
103.6	The Heat	Urban adult contemporary	Te Arawa Communications	Reporoa Paeroa Range	0.1	2022?	Te Arawa FM; Cruise Radio
103.9	Niu FM	Urban contemporary & Pacific radio	Pacific Media Network NPRT	Rotorua Tihiotonga	0.8		
104.7	Universo FM			Rotorua Tihiotonga	0.63		Good News Community Radio
105.5	Mai FM	Urban contemporary	MediaWorks	Rotorua Pukepoto	1	2010	
106.3	Life FM	Contemporary Christian music	Rhema Media	Rotorua Pukepoto	1		

=== AM stations ===
Frequency (kHz)	Name	Format	Owner	Transmitter	Broadcasting on frequency since	Previous stations on frequency
747	Ceased			Rotorua Tihiotonga		2000 – June 2025: Newstalk ZB moved to 94.3 FM; Station broadcast on 702 AM prior to 2006
1107	Ceased			Rotorua Hinemoa Point		Radio Live; 20 March 2022: Magic Talk; 21 March 2022 – late 2022: Today FM on 95.1
1188	Ceased			Rotorua Tihiotonga		11 July 2025: RNZ National
1350	Ceased			Rotorua Tihiotonga		Jul 1959 – 1988: 1ZC / Radio Geyserland; 1988–1990: Today AM; 1990–1997: Vacant; 1997 – 30 March 2020: Radio Sport; 30/03/2020-30/06/2020: Newstalk ZB; 1 July 2020 – June 2025: Gold Sport
1548	Sport Nation	Sports radio	Entain New Zealand Ltd	Rotorua Hinemoa Point	19 November 2024	Broadcast on 1566 AM prior to 1992; 1990–1992: Classic Country 1566; 1992–1993: Classic Country 1548AM; 1993–1998: Classic Gold 1548AM; 1998 – 2005: Lakes FM simulcast 2005–2020: Radio Pacific, BSport, LiveSport, TAB Trackside Radio; 2021–2024: SENZ

=== Low power FM stations ===
Frequency (MHz)	Name	Format	Owner	Transmitter	Broadcasting on frequency since	Previous stations on frequency
87.8	Radio Hauraki	Active rock	NZME	Rotorua	June 2025	
88.3	Power 88.3	Urban contemporary & Contemporary hit radio	Rotorua Youth Centre	Rotorua	2020	Gospel FM

== Eastern Bay of Plenty ==
=== FM stations ===
Frequency (MHz)	Name	Format	Owner	Transmitter	Broadcasting on frequency since	Previous stations on frequency
88.1	The Beat	Urban adult contemporary	Whakaatu Whanaunga Trust	Ōpōtiki LPFM		Mulcher, Opotiki FM
88.9	The Heat	Urban adult contemporary	Te Arawa Communications	Whakatāne Matata Marae		
89.7	One Double X	Adult contemporary music	Radio Bay of Plenty	Whakatāne The Strand		
90.5	One Double X	Adult contemporary music	Radio Bay of Plenty	Whakatāne Manawahe	12 December 1988	FM 90.7 (Summer of 1982)
91.7	Bridge FM	Urban adult contemporary	Whakaatu Whanaunga Trust	Elliott St Ōpōtiki		Sea FM 91.7, Sea 92 FM
92.1	The Breeze	Easy listening	MediaWorks	Whakatāne Putauaki Mt Edgecumbe	1 June 2023	Oct 1991 – 2005: Radio Pacific; 2005 – Jan 2019: Radio Live; 2019 – 20 March 2022: Magic Talk; 21 March 2022 – 30 March 2023: Today FM
92.9	One Double X	Adult contemporary music	Radio Bay of Plenty	Ōhope Kohi Point	6 February 1989	93 Splash FM
93.7	Bayrock	Active rock	Radio Bay of Plenty	Whakatāne Manawahe		
95.3	RNZ Concert	Classical music	RNZ	Whakatāne Putauaki Mt Edgecumbe		
96.1	Sport Nation	Sports radio	Entain New Zealand Ltd	Whakatāne Putauaki Mt Edgecumbe	19 November 2024	2005 – 2020: Radio Pacific, BSport, LiveSport, TAB Trackside Radio (Broadcast on 94.5 FM prior to 2010); 2021–2024: SENZ
96.9	Tumeke FM	Classic hits & Iwi radio	Te Runanga O Ngati Awa	Whakatāne Putauaki Mt Edgecumbe		Sun FM 96.9FM
97.7	Q97	Contemporary hit radio	Radio Bay of Plenty	Whakatāne Manawahe		
99.3	Q97	Contemporary hit radio	Radio Bay of Plenty	Ōhope Kohi Point		99.3 Cadbury Moro FM Whakatāne/Ōhope (Summer of 1992/1993)
99.7	Te Reo o Tawhiuau 99.7FM	Māori language	Te Kura Kaupapa Motuhake O Tawhiuau	Murupara	Oct 2007	
100.1	Bayrock	Active rock	Radio Bay of Plenty	Ōhope		
101.7	RNZ National	Public radio	RNZ	Whakatāne Putauaki Mt Edgecumbe		
104.1	The Edge	Contemporary hit radio	MediaWorks	Whakatāne Putauaki Mt Edgecumbe		
104.9	Life FM	Contemporary Christian music	Rhema Media	Whakatāne Manawahe		
105.7	The Sound	Classic rock	MediaWorks	Whakatāne Putauaki Mt Edgecumbe		
106.5	Sun FM	Contemporary hit radio	Te Runanga O Ngati Awa	Ōhope Kohi Point		
107.3	The ONE – Jesus Radio	Hot AC & Gospel Music	Independent	Whakatāne LPFM	7 March 2022	

=== AM stations ===
Frequency (kHz)	Name	Format	Owner	Transmitter	Broadcasting on frequency since	Previous stations on frequency
1242 AM	One Double X	Adult contemporary music	Radio Bay of Plenty	Whakatāne Thornton	30 June 1971	Station broadcast on 1240 kHz prior to 1978
