= List of radio stations in Manawatū-Whanganui =

These are lists of radio stations in Manawatū-Whanganui in New Zealand.

== Palmerston North FM stations ==
The majority of full-power FM radio stations serving Palmerston North broadcast from one of two transmitters atop Wharite Peak, at the southern end of the Ruahine Range 20 km (12 mi) northeast of central Palmerston North. Stations broadcasting from these transmitters also serve much of the southern half of the region, including the towns of Marton, Feilding, Levin, Foxton, Dannevirke and Pahiatua.

Frequency (MHz)	Station	Format	Location	Licensed power kW	Broadcasting on frequency since	Previous Stations on Frequency
89.0	RNZ Concert	Classical music	Wharite	40		
89.8	Kia Ora FM	Iwi radio	Wharite	1		
90.6	ZM	Contemporary hit radio	Wharite	40		2QQ, Q91 FM, ZMFM
91.4	Rhema	Christian contemporary	Wharite South	4		
92.2	More FM	Adult contemporary	Wharite South	80		2XS FM
93.0	The Edge	Contemporary hit radio	Wharite South	5		Country FM
93.8	The Sound	Classic rock	Wharite	40	8 April 2023	Radio Pacific; Radio Live; Jan 2019 – 20 March 2022: Magic Talk; 21 March 2022 – 30 March 2023: Today FM
94.6	Channel X	Classic alternative	Wharite South	5	8 May 2023	Solid Gold, – 23 April 2023: The Sound moved to 93.8 MHz
95.4	The Rock	Active rock	Wharite South	5		
96.2	Life FM	Contemporary Christian music	Pahiatua Track	0.63		
97.0	Mai FM	Urban music	Wharite South	5		
97.8	The Hits	Adult contemporary music	Wharite	40		Classic Hits 97.8 ZAFM, 98FM, 2ZA
98.6	The Breeze	Easy listening	Wharite South	8		Magic 98.6FM
99.4	Radio Control 99.4FM	Campus radio	Massey University (PN)	0.16		Radio Massey
100.2	Newstalk ZB	Talk radio	Wharite	40		
101.0	RNZ National	Public radio	Wharite	8		
103.4	PMN 531		Wharite South	8	Jan 2019	Niu FM
104.2	Breeze Classic	1970s	Wharite South	5	1 November 2025	George FM moved to LPFM 107.1 MHz; 2018 – 31 October 2025: Magic
105.8	Coast	Easy listening	Wharite	12.5	2018	Radio Hauraki moved to LPFM 87.6 MHz

== Palmerston North AM stations ==
Frequency (KHz)	Name	Format	Transmitter	Licensed power (kW)	Broadcasting on frequency since	Previous stations on frequency
828	Sport Nation	Sports radio	Longburn	16	19 November 2024	2XS, Bright and Easy 828AM, Classic Hits 828, Magic 828, The Breeze, Radio Pacific, BSport, LiveSport, TAB Trackside, SENZ
927			Kairanga	6.3		Newstalk ZB Decommissioned 16 April 2025
999	MPR	Access radio	Setters Line	3.2		Access Manawatu, Access Triple Nine, Manawatu Sounz AM
1089			Kairanga	6.3		30 March 2020: Radio Sport; 30/03 – 30 June 2020: Newstalk ZB; 1 July 2020 – 16 April 2025: Gold Sport moved to 88.0 MHz FM
1449			Kairanga	6.3		RNZ National Decommissioned 12 May 2025
1548	2XS FM	1980s	Setters Line	3.2	1 May 2023	until 30 April 2023: Coast

== Whanganui FM stations ==
Frequency (MHz)	Station	Format	Location	Licensed kW	Broadcasting on frequency since	Previous Stations on Frequency
88.8	The Edge	Contemporary hit radio	Bastia Hill	0.16		
89.6	The Hits	Adult contemporary music	Bastia Hill	0.1	Dec 1993 on FM, 1949 on 1200kHz	Classic Hits River City Radio, 2ZW
90.4	Breeze Classic	1970s	Bastia Hill	0.16	1 November 2025	Mai FM; 2016 – 31 October 2025: Magic
91.2	Brian FM	Adult contemporary/Classic rock	Landguard	0.8	2014	
92.0	ReelWorld Radio	Pop music	Landguard	0.8	2015	
92.8	More FM	Adult contemporary music	Bastia Hill	0.16	1992	Star FM
93.6	Ski FM	Contemporary hit radio	Maxwell Avenue	0.1		2017
94.4	The Sound	Classic rock	Bastia Hill	0.16		FM Country
95.2	The Rock	Active rock	Bastia Hill	0.16		
96.0	Mai FM	Urban music	Bastia Hill	0.16	1 May 2023	Radio Live; Jan 2019 – 20 March 2022: Magic Talk; 21 March 2022 – 30 March 2023: Today FM
96.8	ZM	Contemporary hit radio	Bastia Hill	0.16		
97.6	The Breeze	Easy listening	Bastia Hill	0.16		
98.4	Coast	Easy listening	Bastia Hill	0.16	2015	
99.2	RNZ Concert	Classical music	Mt Jowett	0.16		
100.0	Awa FM	iwi radio, urban contemporary	Landguard	0.8	17 June 1991	
100.8	Life FM	Contemporary Christian music	Durie Hill	0.16		
101.6	RNZ National	Public radio	Mt Jowett	0.16		
104.8	Radio Rhema	Christian radio	Durie Hill	0.16		
105.6	The Avenue		Mt Jowett	0.8		

== Whanganui AM stations ==
Frequency (kHz)	Station	Format	Location	Licensed power kW	Broadcasting on frequency since	Previous Stations on Frequency
594	Sanctuary	Christian radio	Cameron Rd West	3.2	14 February 2025	Until 14 February 2025: Star rebranded
1062	iHeartCountry	Country music	Kaitoke	6.3	4 May 2026	30 March 2020: Radio Sport; 30/03 – 30 June 2020: Newstalk ZB; 01/07/2020-04/05/2026: Gold Sport
1197	Newstalk ZB	Talk radio	Kaitoke	6.3	1978	Classic Hits River City Radio, 2ZW. 2XA in 1949 on 1200kHz

== FM stations in Manawatū-Whanganui outside of Palmerston North and Whanganui ==
Frequency (MHz)	Station	Format	Location	Licensed power kW	Broadcasting on frequency since	Previous Stations on Frequency
90.0	Ski FM	Contemporary hit radio	Taihape (Ridge Road)	0.63		
90.2	Brian FM	Adult contemporary/Classic rock	Raetihi/Ohakune (Waipuna)	1.6	2014	
91.0	Awa FM	Urban contemporary Māori & English language	Ruapehu (Waipuna)	0.8	1991	
91.8	Ski FM	Contemporary hit radio	Ruapehu (Waipuna)	1.6		
92.6	Sanctuary	Christian radio	Raetihi (Hukaroa)	1.25	14 February 2025	Until 14 February 2025: Star rebranded
93.2	Brian FM	Adult contemporary/Classic rock	Taihape (Papaki Road)	1	2014	
95.0	Radio Rhema	Christian radio	Raetihi (Hukaroa)	1.25		
95.8	Peak FM	Community radio	Ruapehu (Waipuna)	0.8		
98.2	Life FM	Contemporary Christian music	Raetihi (Hukaroa)	1.25		
99.0	Cruise FM	Pop & Rock	Ruapehu (Waipuna)	1.6		
99.6	Peak FM	Full-service radio	Taihape	0.8		
99.6	Radio Woodville	Full-service radio	Woodville (McLean Street)	0.05		
100.6	Tuwharetoa FM	Urban contemporary Māori & English language	Taihape (Mount Maire)	0.8		
104.6	Reelworld Radio	Pop music	Ruapehu (Waipuna)	1.6		
105.4	Radio Foxton		Foxton (Avenue Road)	0.16		
106.2	Ski FM	Contemporary hit radio	Ohakune (Clyde Street)	0.1		
106.5	Radio Eketahuna	Community radio	Eketāhuna (Mt Bowen)	0.5	2012	

== AM stations in Manawatū-Whanganui outside of Palmerston North and Whanganui ==
Frequency (kHz)	Station	Format	Location	Broadcasting on frequency since	Previous stations on frequency
1125	Ruapehu Radio 2XR	Short term station that ran during winter from 1983 until 1986. A second transmitter operated at Whakapapa on 1233 kHz.			
1602	Radio Reading Service		Levin		Shut down February 2019
