= List of radio stations in Hawke's Bay =

This is a list of radio stations in Hawke's Bay in New Zealand.

== Stations in Hastings and Napier ==
=== FM stations ===
Frequency (MHz)	Station	Location	Format	Airdate	Previous Stations on Frequency
88.7	More FM	Mt Erin	Adult contemporary	2015	
89.5	The Hits	Mt Threave	Adult contemporary music	17 July 1994	Classic Hits 89.5, Classic Hits 89FM, Bay City Radio
90.3	Newstalk ZB	Mt Threave	Talk radio	2011	Easy Mix, Viva, Easy Listening i, Cool 90.3FM, Easy 90FM, Easy Listening 90FM, Easy Listening i90FM, The Alligator 90-100FM, The Alligator 90FM
91.1	RNZ Concert	Mt Erin	Classical music		
91.9	The Sound	Mt Erin	Classic rock	1 January 2012	Solid Gold, Hawke's Bay's 92FM, 92 More FM
92.7	Breeze Classic	Mt Erin	1970s	1 November 2025	More FM (now 88.7), Hot93, 93FM, Radio Hawke's Bay; 2015—31 October 2025: Magic
93.5	Life FM	Mt Threave	Contemporary Christian music	2001	
94.3	Radio Kahungunu	Mt Threave	Urban contemporary Māori language & English	4 September 2000	
95.1	The Rock	Mt Erin	Active rock	3 September 1997	
95.9	ZM	Mt Erin	Contemporary hit radio	1 March 1999	Radio Hauraki, Classic Rock 96FM, Better Music 96FM, Greatest Hits FM96
96.7	Radio Hauraki	Mt Erin	Modern rock	17 September 2019	Radio Sport, Easy Mix, Flava (previously operated on 96.8)
97.5	The Breeze	Mt Erin	Easy listening	6 August 2007	Radio Live; Radio Pacific
98.3	The Edge	Mt Erin	Pop music	5 February 1998	
99.1	Rhema	Mt Threave	Christian radio	1994	
99.9	Coast	Mt Threave	Middle of the Road	28 March 2011	Radio Hauraki, The Alligator 90-100FM (99.9 broadcast from Bluff Hill)
100.7	Bay FM	Mt Threave	Local Community radio	July 2009	
101.5	RNZ National	Mt Erin	Public radio		
103.9	PMN 531	Mt Threave	English & Pacific Island languages	Jan 2019	Niu FM
104.7	Radio Hawke's Bay	Mt Threave	Access radio	August 2022	27 November 2009 – August 2022: Radio Kidnappers
105.5	Mai FM	Mt Erin	Urban contemporary	March 2010	
106.3	Channel X	Mt Erin	Classic alternative	8 May 2023	13 March 2015: Radio Live; Dec 2019: More FM; 20 March 2022: Magic Talk; 21 March 2022 – 30 March 2023: Today FM

=== AM stations ===
Frequency (kHz)	Station	Location	Format	Airdate	Previous Stations on Frequency
549	Sport Nation	Opapa	Sports radio	19 November 2024	11 April 2005: Radio Pacific/Trackside, 2007: BSport, 2010: LiveSPORT, 2015: TAB Trackside, 2021: SENZ
630	RNZ National	Opapa	Public radio		
765	Radio Kahungunu	Opapa	Urban contemporary Māori language & English	1990	Greatest Hits 77ZK (relocated to 95.9FM as Greatest Hits FM96 in December 1989), Hit Radio 77ZK, Apple Radio (1977)
909	AM Network (Parliament) and Sanctuary	Opapa	Parliament and Christian radio	4 June 1999	14 February 2025: Star rebranded Sanctuary
1125	iHeartCountry	Pakowhai	Country music	4 May 2026	30 March 2020: Radio Sport; 30/03 – 30 June 2020: Newstalk ZB; 01/07/2020-04/05/2026: Gold Sport
1278	Newstalk ZB	Pakowhai	Talk radio	1 August 1994	Bay City Radio, 2ZC
1368	Radio Aotearoa	Whakatu Substation	Maori Music, Kiwi Music, Classic Hits	2024	07/08/2007-18/01/2019: Radio Live; 19 January 2019 – 20 March 2022: Magic Talk; 21 Mar – Dec 2022 Today FM on 106.3 MHz; The Breeze temporary for Feb 2022 floods information
1431	Radio Hawke's Bay	Whakatu Substation	Access radio	August 2022	1995 – August 2022: Radio Kidnappers
1530	Radio Spice	Whakatu Substation	Punjabi language (relay of Radio Spice 88FM Auckland)	Nov 2022	20 September 1995 – Nov 2022: Coast, Jammin' Oldies (Jo 1530), Gold 1530, The Wireless Station
1584	Decommissioned	Pakowhai			Coast

=== LPFM stations ===
Frequency (MHz)	Station	Location	Format	Airdate	Previous Stations on Frequency
87.6	Instrumental FM	Hastings West	Instrumental music		
87.7		Tamatea			Apr 2022 – 13 August 2024: Soundwave FM
87.8		Napier			Soundwave FM until April 2022
87.9	Kai FM	Hastings		April 2025	previously on 87.8
88.1	Small FM (Previously Magic FM)	Onekawa	Classic Hits	1997	
88.3	Greenmeadows FM	Greenmeadows, Napier	Rock-Pop		
88.3	Instrumental FM	Napier Hill	Instrumental music		Hastings 2014: Hit Mix FM, relay of Radio Spice (1530 kHz AM Nov 2022)
106.7	Small FM (Previously Magic FM)	Taradale	Classic Hits	1997	
106.8	Frimley Primary School	Frimley, Hastings	Computer generated music mix		
106.9	Taradale Intermediate School	Taradale			
106.9	Tamatea Eye	Tamatea	Tamatea Intermediate School		
107.1		Napier Hill			TLC Radio, Instrumental FM
107.1	Instrumental FM	Onekawa	Instrumental music		
107.3	Three Angels Broadcasting Network	Parkvale, Hastings	Seventh Day Adventist – Relay Off Satellite		
107.5	Three Angels Broadcasting Network	Greenmeadows	Seventh Day Adventist – Relay Off Satellite		
107.7		Tamatea			1997 – 18 August 2024: Soundwave FM

== FM stations in Wairoa and Central Hawke's Bay ==
Frequency (MHz)	Station	Location	Format	Airdate	Previous Stations on Frequency
88.0	Radio Te Wairoa (Previously 88.5 MHz)	Wairoa			
88.1	Three Angels Broadcasting Network	Waipawa	Seventh Day Adventist – Relay Off Satellite		
92.5	Rhema	Wairoa	Christian radio		
94.1	The Rock	Wairoa	Active rock		94FM
98.9	More FM	Wairoa	Adult contemporary		
99.4	Central FM	Dannevirke Reservoir	Community radio		
99.7	The Hits	Wairoa	Adult contemporary music	30 December 2010	ZM, Radio Hauraki 96FM, Classic Rock 96FM, Better Music 96FM, Greatest Hits FM96 (Dec 1989)
105.2	Central FM	Waipukurau Tourere	Local Community radio		
106.0	Central FM	Waipukurau Two Peaks	Local Community radio		
107.1	WPS 107.1FM	Waipawa	Waipawa Primary School		
