= List of radio stations in Nelson and Tasman =

This is a list of radio stations in Nelson and Tasman, New Zealand.

Most stations in Nelson and Tasman are based in Nelson.

== FM and AM stations ==
Frequency	Name	Format	Transmitter	Licensed max (kW)	Broadcasting on frequency since	Previous stations on frequency
88.8 FM	The Edge	Contemporary hit radio	Grampians, Nelson	5		Radio Nelson
89.6 FM	The Hits	Adult contemporary music	Grampians, Nelson	5		Radio Nelson
89.6 FM	The Hits	Adult contemporary music	Mt Campbell	1.58		
90.4 FM	Radio Hauraki	Active rock	Grampians, Nelson	5	2006	Classic Hits / Radio Nelson
91.0 FM	Brian FM	Adult hits	Mt Burnett, Tākaka	0.5		
91.2 FM	RNZ Concert	Classical music	Grampians	5		
92.0 FM	More FM	Adult contemporary music	Mount Campbell, Nelson	1.58	1992	Fifeshire FM
92.8 FM	More FM	Adult contemporary music	Grampians, Nelson	5	1988	Fifeshire FM
93.4 FM	Life FM	Contemporary Christian music	Tākaka Hill	0.1		
93.6 FM	Life FM	Contemporary Christian music	Grampians	5		
94.1 FM	More FM	Adult contemporary music	Murchison, Mount Murchison	0.8	1992	Fifeshire FM
94.4 FM	The Rock	Active rock	Grampians	5	1999	was on 94.6FM prior to 2010
95.0 FM	Fresh FM	Access radio	Tākaka	0.1	1994	Harvest Radio
95.2 FM	George FM	Dance music	Grampians	1.58		
95.8 FM	XS80s	1980's Music	Tākaka	0.1	2016	
96.0 FM	Channel X	Classic alternative	Grampians	1.58	8 May 2023	Radio Live; 20 March 2022: Magic Talk; 21 March 2022 – 30 March 2023: Today FM
96.8 FM	ZM	1980's Music	Grampians	5	2004	1999 – 2004: The Planet 97FM was on 97.0FM prior 2010
97.3 FM	Radio Rhema	Christian radio	Mt Murchison	0.8		
97.6 FM	The Breeze	Easy listening	Grampians, Nelson	5	2008	Was on 97.8FM between 2008 and 2010
98.2 FM	RNZ National	Public radio	Mt Burnett	0.5		
98.4 FM	The Sound	Classic rock	Grampians	3.16	1999	1993–99 Fifeshire Classic 99FM; 1999–2011 Solid Gold (same station was on 98.6 FM prior t0 2010, rebranded as The Sound)
99.2 FM	Breeze Classic	1970s	Grampians	5	1 November 2025	2015 – 31 October 2025: Magic
100.8 FM	Coast	Easy listening	Grampians	5	2010	was on 100.2FM during 2010
101.6 FM	RNZ National	Public radio	Grampians	2.5	2004	was on 101.0FM prior to 2010
104.0 FM	iHeartCountry New Zealand	Country music	Grampians	5	9 February 2025	– 30 June 2020: Mix; 1 July 2020 – 9 May 2025: Gold
104.8 FM	Fresh FM	Access radio	Nelson	1.58	1994	Boulder Radio
105.3 FM	Brian FM	Adult hits	Mt Murchison	0.8	2019	2018: Radio Live
105.6 FM	Brian FM	Adult hits	Grampians	5	Sept 2018	
106.4 FM	Newstalk ZB	Talk radio	Grampians	5	29 November 2021	
549 AM	ceased		Stoke			30 March 2020: Radio Sport; 30/03 – 30 June 2020: Newstalk ZB; 1 July 2020 – 5 April 2025: Gold Sport
612 AM	Sanctuary	Christian radio	Nelson	3.16	14 February 2025	Until 14 February 2025: Star rebranded
801 AM	Radio Rhema	Christian radio	Nelson	3.16		
990 AM	Sport Nation	Sports radio	Richmond	5	19 November 2024	1983 – 1988: Radio Fifeshire; TAB Trackside; SENZ
1116 AM	ceased		Stoke			until 31 March 2025: RNZ National
1269 AM	ceased		Tākaka			The Hits
1341 AM	Newstalk ZB	Talk radio	Nelson	3.16	4 May 2026	until 26 March 2025: Newstalk ZB; 4/04/2025-4/05/2026: Gold Sport

== Low power FM stations ==
Frequency	Name	Format	Broadcast area	Stations previously on frequency/Remarks
87.6 FM			Nelson	Calvary Chapel Radio
87.8 FM	Coast FM	Adult hits	Murchison	1995: relay of 96.5 FM Westport on LPFM frequency
88.1 FM	Community Radio Nelson	Hits	Nelson	
88.2 FM	World FM	World Music	Mārahau	
88.3 FM	Sanctuary	Christian radio	Murchison	Until 14 February 2025: Star rebranded
106.8 FM	Calvary Chapel Radio of Nelson	Christian radio	Nelson	
106.8 FM	UGM		Golden Bay	
107.6 FM	World FM	World Music	Stoke	Relays Marahau 88.2 MHz
