= List of radio stations in Gisborne =

This is a list of radio stations in Gisborne in New Zealand.

== Gisborne ==
=== FM stations ===
Frequency (MHz)	Name	Format	Transmitter	Broadcasting on frequency since	Previous stations on frequency
89.3	Radio Ngāti Porou	Urban contemporary	Tikitiki NcNeil Road		
89.3	Mai FM	Urban music	Gisborne Wheatstone Rd		
90.1	More FM	Adult contemporary	Gisborne Wharekopae		
90.5	Radio Ngāti Porou	Urban contemporary	Tolaga Bay Shelton Road		
90.9	The Hits	Adult contemporary	Gisborne Wheatstone Rd		Classic Hits 90.9FM, Classic Hits ZGFM
91.7	Turanga FM	Urban contemporary	Gisborne Wheatstone Rd		
92.5	Sanctuary	Christian radio	Gisborne Wheatstone Rd	14/02/2025	until 14/02/2025: Star rebranded Sanctuary
93.3	Radio Ngāti Porou	Urban contemporary	Gisborne Wheatstone Rd; Ruatoria Hikurangi Spur; Tolaga Bay Titirangi		
94.1	The Rock	Active rock	Gisborne Wheatstone Rd		
94.9	The Breeze	Easy listening	Gisborne Wharekopae	31/03/2023	Radio Live; 2019 - 20/03/2022: Magic Talk; 21/03/2022 - 30/03/2023: Today FM
95.7	Turanga FM	Urban contemporary	Gisborne Wharekopae		
96.5	The Sound	Album rock	Gisborne Wheatstone Rd		Solid Gold, B96 Classic Gold
97.3	RNZ Concert	Classical music	Gisborne Whakapunake		
98.1	Turanga FM	Urban contemporary	Gisborne Whakapunake		
98.5	Radio Ngāti Porou	Urban contemporary	Ruatoria Hikurangi Spur		
98.9	More FM	Adult contemporary	Gisborne Wheatstone Rd		89FM
99.3	Uawa FM		Tolaga Bay Shelton Rd Station		
99.7	The Edge	Pop music	Gisborne Wheatstone Rd		
100.5	Life FM	Contemporary Christian music	Gisborne Wheatstone Rd		
101.3	RNZ National	Public radio	Gisborne Wheatstone Rd		
103.7	Radio Rhema	Christian radio	Gisborne Wheatstone Rd		
105.3	Radio Ngāti Porou	Urban contemporary	Te Araroa Te Araroa Rd		
105.3	Radio Hauraki	Mainstream rock	Gisborne Wheatstone Rd		
106.1	Coast	Middle of the Road	Gisborne Wheatstone Rd	1/05/2023	1/07/2020 - 1/05/2023: Gold
106.5	Radio Ngāti Porou	Urban contemporary	Tokomaru Bay Tawhiti St		

=== AM stations ===
Frequency (kHz)	Name	Format	Transmitter	Broadcasting on frequency since	Previous stations on frequency
585	Radio Ngāti Porou	Urban contemporary	Ruatoria Racecourse Road		
945	Newstalk ZB	Talk radio	Gisborne Wainui		Classic Hits ZGFM, 2ZG
1314	RNZ National	Public radio	Gisborne Wainui		
1485	Sport Nation	Sports radio	Gisborne Wainui	19/11/2024	TAB Trackside, SENZ

=== Low power FM stations ===
Frequency (MHz)	Name	Format	Transmitter	Broadcasting on frequency since	Previous stations on frequency
87.7	Tama-Ohi		Gisborne		
87.9	Switch FM	Alternative - Dance music	Gisborne	2010	
88.3	Uawa FM		Tolaga Bay		(also on 99.3 FM)
88.3	iHeartCountry New Zealand	Country music	Gisborne	09/05/2025	2018 - 30/06/2020: Mix; Flava; 01/05/2023 - 09/05/2025: Gold
106.7	(Vacant)	Alternative Dance / CHR / Hot AC	Gisborne CBD	2002-2004	G-The Music Channel, The Heat
106.8	Spellbound Radio	Electric blues - Indie rock	Gisborne	2011	
107.4	ZM	Contemporary hit radio	Gisborne		
107.7	ZM	Contemporary hit radio	Gisborne		
