= List of radio stations in Northland =

The following is a list of radio stations in the New Zealand region of Northland, as of 2020. It includes the frequency, name, owner and transmitter location of each station, its first airdate on that frequency, and previous stations that broadcast on the station. Radio stations in Northland predominantly broadcast from Whangārei, Kaikohe and Kaitaia.

The commercial Northland radio market covers 112,000 people, from the region's total population of 166,000. In a survey of 800 people in 2014, More FM was the most popular station with an estimated 27,000 listeners and 17.3% market share.

== Upper Northland ==
=== FM stations ===
| Frequency (MHz) | Name | Format | Owner | Location (transmitter) | Broadcasting on frequency since | Previous stations on frequency |
|---|---|---|---|---|---|---|
| 89.2 | The Hits | Adult contemporary music | NZME | Kaikohe (Hikurangi); Kaitaia (Maungataniwha) | 1 December 2024 | Gold |
| 89.6 | Coast | Classic hits | NZME | Russell | | |
| 90.0 | The Rock | Active rock | MediaWorks | Kaikohe (Hikurangi); Kaitaia (Maungataniwha) | | |
| 91.6 | More FM | Adult contemporary | MediaWorks | Kaikohe (Hikurangi); Kaitaia (Maungataniwha) | | |
| 92.0 | The Sound | Classic rock | MediaWorks | Kerikeri (Cottle Hill Drive) | | |
| 92.4 | | | | Kaikohe (Hikurangi); Kaitaia (Maungataniwha) | | BSport, LiveSport, TAB Trackside |
| 93.2 | Radio Hauraki | Active rock | NZME | Kaikohe (Hikurangi); Kaitaia (Maungataniwha) | | |
| 93.6 | Defunct | | | Kaitaia | | Kaitaia Community Radio, 1KCR |
| 93.6 | Radio Hauraki | Active rock | NZME | Russell | | |
| 94.0 | The Edge | Hit radio | MediaWorks | Kaikohe (Hikurangi); Kaitaia (Maungataniwha) | | |
| 94.4 | | | | Russell | | BSport, LiveSport, TAB Trackside, SENZ, Sport Nation |
| 94.8 | ZM | Hit radio | NZME | Kaikohe (Hikurangi); Kaitaia (Maungataniwha) | | |
| 95.2 | More FM | Adult contemporary music | MediaWorks | Russell | | |
| 95.6 | iHeartCountry New Zealand | Country music | NZME | Kaikohe (Hikurangi); Kaitaia (Maungataniwha) | 9 May 2025 | The Hits; Gold |
| 96.4 | Coast | Middle of the Road | NZME | Kaikohe (Hikurangi); Kaitaia (Maungataniwha) | 20 June 2021 | The Hits |
| −96.8 | Defunct | | | Kaitaia | 2010 | |
| 97.1 | Te Hiku O Te Ika FM | Full service Iwi radio | Te Hiku Media | Kaitaia (Maungataniwha) | | |
| 97.3 | RNZ Concert | Fine music | Radio New Zealand | Russell | | |
| 97.5 | Tautoko FM | Full service iwi radio | | Kaikohe (Hikurangi) | | |
| 98.3 | RNZ Concert | Fine music | Radio New Zealand | Kaikohe (Hikurangi) | | |
| 99.1 | Ngati Hine FM | Full service | Ngati Hine | Kaikohe (Hikurangi) | | Radio Ngatihine |
| 99.5 | Tautoko FM | Full service iwi radio | | Kaitaia (Maungataniwha) | | |
| 99.9 | Rhema | Christian adult contemporary | Rhema Media | Kaikohe (Browns Hill) | | |
| 100.3 | RNZ Concert | Fine music | Radio New Zealand | Kaitaia (Maungataniwha) | | |
| 100.7 | The Breeze | Easy listening | MediaWorks | Kaikohe (Hikurangi) | 31 March 2023 | Radio Live; Jan 2019 – 20 March 2022: Magic Talk; 21 March 2022 – 30 March 2023: Today FM |
| 101.1 | RNZ National | Public radio | Radio New Zealand | Kaitaia (Maungataniwha) | | |
| 101.5 | RNZ National | Public radio | Radio New Zealand | Kaikohe (Hikurangi) | | |
| 103.5 | Life FM | Christian contemporary hit radio | Rhema Media | Kaitaia (Awanui) | | |
| 104.3 | Sunshine FM | Iwi radio | Te Hiku Media | Kaitaia (Puketutu) | 2004 | |
| 105.1 | Newstalk ZB | Talk radio | NZME | Kaitaia (Maungataniwha) | July 2022 | until July 2022: Radio Hauraki |
| 105.3 | Tautoko FM | Full service iwi radio | | Russell | | |
| 105.9 | Coast | Classic hits | NZME | Doubtless Bay (Mangonui) | | The Hits |
| 106.1 | The Hits | Adult contemporary music | NZME | Russell | | |
| 106.3 | Life FM | Christian contemporary hit radio | Rhema Media | Waimamaku | | |

== LPFM stations ==
| Frequency (MHz) | Name | Format | Owner | Location | Broadcasting on frequency since | Previous Stations on Frequency |
|---|---|---|---|---|---|---|
| 88.0 | Paihia FM | LPFM | | Paihia | | |
| 107.3 | More FM | LPFM Adult contemporary | MediaWorks | Kerikeri | | |

=== AM stations ===
| Frequency (kHz) | Name | Format | Owner | Transmitter | Broadcasting on frequency since | Previous stations on frequency |
|---|---|---|---|---|---|---|
| 549 | Rhema | Christian adult contemporary | Rhema Media | Kaitaia (Awanui) | | |
| 837 | RNZ National | | | Kaitaia (Waipapakauri) | | RNZ National AM transmission ceased July 2022 due to the mast at Waipapakauri being in danger of collapse. A new mast was built and transmitting again as of 28 November 2022 |
| 981 | RNZ National | Public radio | Radio New Zealand | Kaikohe | | |
| 1026 | Silent | | | Kaitaia (Waipapakauri) | | Newstalk ZB AM transmission ceased July 2022 due to the mast at Waipapakauri being in danger of collapse. |
| 1215 | Newstalk ZB | Talk radio | NZME | Kaikohe | | |

== Lower Northland ==
=== FM stations ===
| Frequency (MHz) | Name | Format | Owner | Transmitter | Broadcasting on frequency since | Previous stations on frequency |
|---|---|---|---|---|---|---|
| 89.2 | The Hits | Adult contemporary | NZME | Whangārei (Horokaka & Parahaki) | 1 December 2024 | 2016 – 30 June 2020: Mix; 1 July 2020 – 1 December 2024: Gold |
| 90.0 | The Rock | Active rock | MediaWorks | Whangārei (Parahaki) | | |
| 90.4 | The Wireless | | Perryscope Productions | Mangawhai | | |
| 90.8 | The Breeze | Easy listening | MediaWorks | Whangārei (Parahaki) | 31 March 2023 | Radio Live; Jan 2019 – 20 March 2022: Magic Talk; 21 March 2022 – 30 March 2023: Today FM |
| 91.6 | More FM | Adult contemporary | MediaWorks | Whangārei (Horokaka & Parahaki) | | KCC FM |
| 92.4 | Breeze Classic | 1970s | MediaWorks | Whangārei (Parahaki) | 1 November 2025 | BSport, LiveSport, TAB Trackside, SENZ, Sport Nation, 27/01 – 31 October 2025: Magic |
| 93.2 | Radio Hauraki | Active rock | NZME | Whangārei (Horokaka & Parahaki) | | |
| 93.6 | More FM – Rodney | Adult contemporary | MediaWorks | Mangawhai | 2016 | |
| 94.0 | The Edge | Hit radio | MediaWorks | Whangārei (Parahaki) | | |
| 94.4 | More FM | Adult contemporary | MediaWorks | Tutukaka | | |
| 94.8 | ZM | Hit radio | NZME | Whangārei (Horokaka & Parahaki) | 1995 | |
| 95.6 | iHeartCountry New Zealand | Country music | NZME | Whangārei (Horokaka & Parahaki) | 1 December 2024 | Classic Hits, Radio Northland; 20 June 2021 – 1 December 2024: The Hits; 1 December 2024 – 9 May 2025: Gold |
| 96.4 | Coast | Middle of the Road | NZME | Whangārei (Horokaka & Parahaki) | 20 June 2021 | |
| 98.0 | The Sound | Classic rock | MediaWorks | Whangārei (Parahaki) | | Mai FM |
| 98.6 | Big River FM | Community radio | Community-owned | Dargaville (Rowland Road) | | |
| 98.8 | Life FM | Christian radio | Rhema Media | Whangārei (Parakiore) | | |
| 99.6 | Ngati Hine FM | Full service | Ngati Hine | Whangārei (Parahaki) | | Radio Ngatihine |
| 100.0 | Defunct | | | Whangārei | | Soundwaves |
| 100.0 | Defunct | | | Mangawhai | 2013 | More FM – Rodney, Times FM |
| 100.4 | RNZ Concert | Fine music | Radio New Zealand | Whangārei (Parahaki) | | |
| 101.2 | RNZ National | Public radio | Radio New Zealand | Whangārei (Horokaka) | | |
| 103.6 | PMN 531pi | English & Pacific Island programme | Pacific Media Network | Whangārei (Parakiore) | Jan 2019 | Niu FM |
| 104.2 | Life FM | Christian radio | Rhema Media | Dargaville (Museum) | | |
| 104.4 | RNZ National | Public radio | Radio New Zealand | Whangārei (Parahaki) | | |
| 105.2 | RNZ Concert | Fine music | Radio New Zealand | Whangārei (Horokaka) | | |
| 105.6 | Smooth FM | | Infinity Media | Waipu | | |
| 106.0 | Flava | Urban contemporary | NZME | Whangārei (Parahaki) | 19 July 2021 | Coast moved to 96.4 |
| 106.4 | Heads FM | | Perryscope Productions | Mangawhai | | |

=== AM stations ===
| Frequency (kHz) | Name | Format | Owner | Transmitter | Broadcasting on frequency since | Previous stations on frequency |
|---|---|---|---|---|---|---|
| 621 | Rhema | Christian adult contemporary | Rhema Media | Maungakaramea | | |
| 729 | Newstalk ZB | Talk radio | NZME | Otaika | 4 May 2026 | Until 30 March 2020: Radio Sport; 30/03/2020-30/06/2020: Newstalk ZB; 1/07/2020-4/05/2026: Gold Sport |
| 837 | RNZ National | Public radio | Radio New Zealand | Otaika | | |
| 900 | Coast | Middle of the Road | NZME | Maungakaramea | | |
| 1026 | Newstalk ZB | Talk radio | NZME | Otaika | | |

=== Internet stations ===
- New Zealand Net Radio, Whangārei.

=== Low power FM stations ===
| Frequency (MHz) | Name | Format | Owner | Transmitter | Broadcasting on frequency since | Previous stations on frequency |
|---|---|---|---|---|---|---|
| 87.6 | Overhype | Dance radio, alternative rock | | Parihaki | | |
| 88.0 | TLC Radio | Country music | | Te Kōpuru | | |
| 88.1 | | | | Mangawhai | | Heads FM on 106.4 MHz |
| 88.1 | Beagle Radio | Community radio | | Whangārei | | |
| 88.2 | Sanctuary | | Rhema Media | Mangawhai Heads | 14 February 2025 | |
| 88.2 | Cool FM | | | Dargaville | | |
| 88.2 | Big River FM | | | Ruawai | | |
| 88.3 | Magic Music FM | | | Whangārei | | |
| 89.0 | Defunct | | | Whangārei | | The Zone 89 |
| 106.9 | Sanctuary | | Rhema Media | Kamo | 14 February 2025 | Until 14 February 2025: Star rebranded Sanctuary |
| 107.1 | Magic Music FM | | | Whangārei | | |
| 107.3 | Mai FM | Urban music | MediaWorks | Whangārei | | |
| 107.3 | TLC FM | Country music | | Dargaville | | |
| 107.5 | Sport Nation | Sports radio | Entain New Zealand Ltd | Whangārei | 19 November 2024 | |
| 107.7 | Smooth FM | | Infinity Media | Whangārei | 2024 | The Generator |
| 107.7 | Sanctuary | | Rhema Media | Dargaville | 14 February 2025 | |
