= List of radio stations in Taranaki =

These are lists of radio stations in Taranaki in New Zealand.

Most Taranaki stations originate from New Plymouth and Hāwera.

== Stations in New Plymouth ==
=== FM stations ===
| Frequency (MHz) | Name | Format | Transmitter | Broadcasting on frequency since | Previous stations on frequency |
|---|---|---|---|---|---|
| 89.2 | Breeze Classic | 1970s | Mount Taranaki | 1 November 2025 | Jan 2019: Radio Live, Dec 2019: Magic Talk; Jan 2019 – 31 October 2025: Magic |
| 90.0 | The Hits | Adult contemporary radio | Mount Taranaki | | Radio Taranaki, QFM, Classic Hits |
| 90.8 | Radio Hauraki | Modern rock Alternative music | Mount Taranaki | | |
| 91.6 | RNZ Concert | Classical music | Mount Taranaki | | Concert FM |
| 92.4 | The Breeze | Easy listening | Mount Taranaki | | |
| 93.2 | More FM | Adult contemporary radio | Mount Taranaki | | Energy FM |
| 94.0 | The Edge | Contemporary hit radio | Mount Taranaki | | |
| 94.8 | Te Korimako o Taranaki | Iwi Radio | Mount Taranaki | 1 July 1992 | |
| 95.6 | The Rock | Active rock | Mount Taranaki | | |
| 96.4 | Newstalk ZB | Talk radio | Mount Taranaki | | |
| 97.2 | Sport Nation | Sports radio | Mount Taranaki | 19 November 2024 | BSport, LiveSport, TAB Trackside, SENZ |
| 98.0 | The Sound | Classic rock | Mount Taranaki | | Solid Gold, Easy 98FM |
| 98.8 | ZM | Contemporary hit radio | Mount Taranaki | | |
| 99.6 | Life FM | Christian contemporary | Mount Taranaki | | |
| 100.4 | The Most FM | Alternative music | Mount Taranaki | | |
| 101.2 | RNZ National | Public radio | Mount Taranaki | | National Radio |
| 103.6 | PMN 531 | Pacific Radio | Mount Taranaki | Jan 2019 | Niu FM |
| 104.4 | Access Radio Taranaki | Community radio | Mount Taranaki | 2010 | |
| 105.2 | Brian FM | Anything | Mount Taranaki | 7 July 2022 | Cruize 105.2 |
| 106.0 | Coast | Middle of the Road | Mount Taranaki | 1 January 2019 | Flava, Mix |

=== AM stations ===
| Frequency (kHz) | Name | Format | Transmitter | Broadcasting on frequency since | Previous stations on frequency |
|---|---|---|---|---|---|
| 540 | Radio Rhema | Christian radio | Kaimata | | |
| 612 | Vacant | | Kaimata | | Until 14 February 2025: Star rebranded 14/02/2025 – 31/07/2026 Sanctuary |
| 774 | Newstalk ZB | Talk radio | Kaimata | 4 May 2026 | 30 March 2020: Radio Sport; 30/03 – 30 June 2020: Newstalk ZB; 1/07/2020-4/05/2026: Gold Sport |
| 918 | Vacant | | Bell Block site decommissioned | | until 13 November 2020: RNZ National |
| 1053 | Vacant | | Bell Block site decommissioned | | until 13 November 2020: Newstalk ZB |
| 1359 | Vacant | | Bell Block site decommissioned | | until 13 November 2020: Coast |

== Low-power FM stations ==
| Frequency (MHz) | Name | Format | Broadcast area | Broadcasting on frequency since | Previous stations on frequency |
|---|---|---|---|---|---|
| 87.6 | The Machine FM | Adult contemporary radio | New Plymouth | | |
| 87.8 | | | New Plymouth | | Hokonui; 30/11/2020-04/05/2026: Gold Sport |
| 88.1 | Atomic FM | Classic hits | New Plymouth | | |
| 106.4 | Dove FM | Oldies | New Plymouth | | |
| 106.7 | 106.7 | Classic hits | New Plymouth | | |
| 107.1 | Firstlight Radio | Contemporary Christian music | New Plymouth | | |
| 107.4 | 3ABN | Christian Music & Talk | New Plymouth | | |
| 107.6 | Jolt | Alternative rock | New Plymouth | | |
| 107.9 | Dove FM | Oldies | New Plymouth | | |

== Stations outside New Plymouth ==
=== FM stations ===
| Frequency (MHz) | Name | Format | Transmitter | Broadcasting on frequency since | Previous stations on frequency |
|---|---|---|---|---|---|
| 88.2 | | | Hāwera | | Hokonui; 30/11/2020-04/05/2026: Gold Sport |
| 88.4 | Crossroads FM | Country music | Waitara | | |
| 90.0 | The Hits | Adult contemporary music | Ōakura South Road | | |
| 91.2 | The Hits | Adult contemporary music | Opunake Kahui Trig | | |
| 92.8 | More FM | Adult contemporary | Opunake Kahui Trig | | |
| 93.6 | Radio Rhema | Christian radio | Opunake Kina Rd | | |
| 96.8 | More FM | Adult contemporary | Ōakura Washer Road, Omata | | |
| 98.4 | Te Korimako o Taranaki | Iwi Radio | Opunake Kahui Trig | | |
| 100.0 | More FM | Adult contemporary | Ōkato Pukeiti | | |

=== LPFM stations ===
| Frequency (MHz) | Name | Format | Transmitter | Broadcasting on frequency since | Previous stations on frequency |
|---|---|---|---|---|---|
| 107.4 | The Most FM | Alternative music | Ōakura | | |

=== AM stations ===
| Frequency (kHz) | Name | Format | Transmitter | Broadcasting on frequency since | Previous stations on frequency |
|---|---|---|---|---|---|
| 1323 | Coast | Middle of the Road | Hāwera Rotokare | | |
| 1557 | Newstalk ZB | Talk radio | Hāwera Rotokare | 4 May 2026 | Hokonui; 30/11/2020-04/05/2026: Gold Sport |
