= Wharite Peak =

Mountain in New Zealand

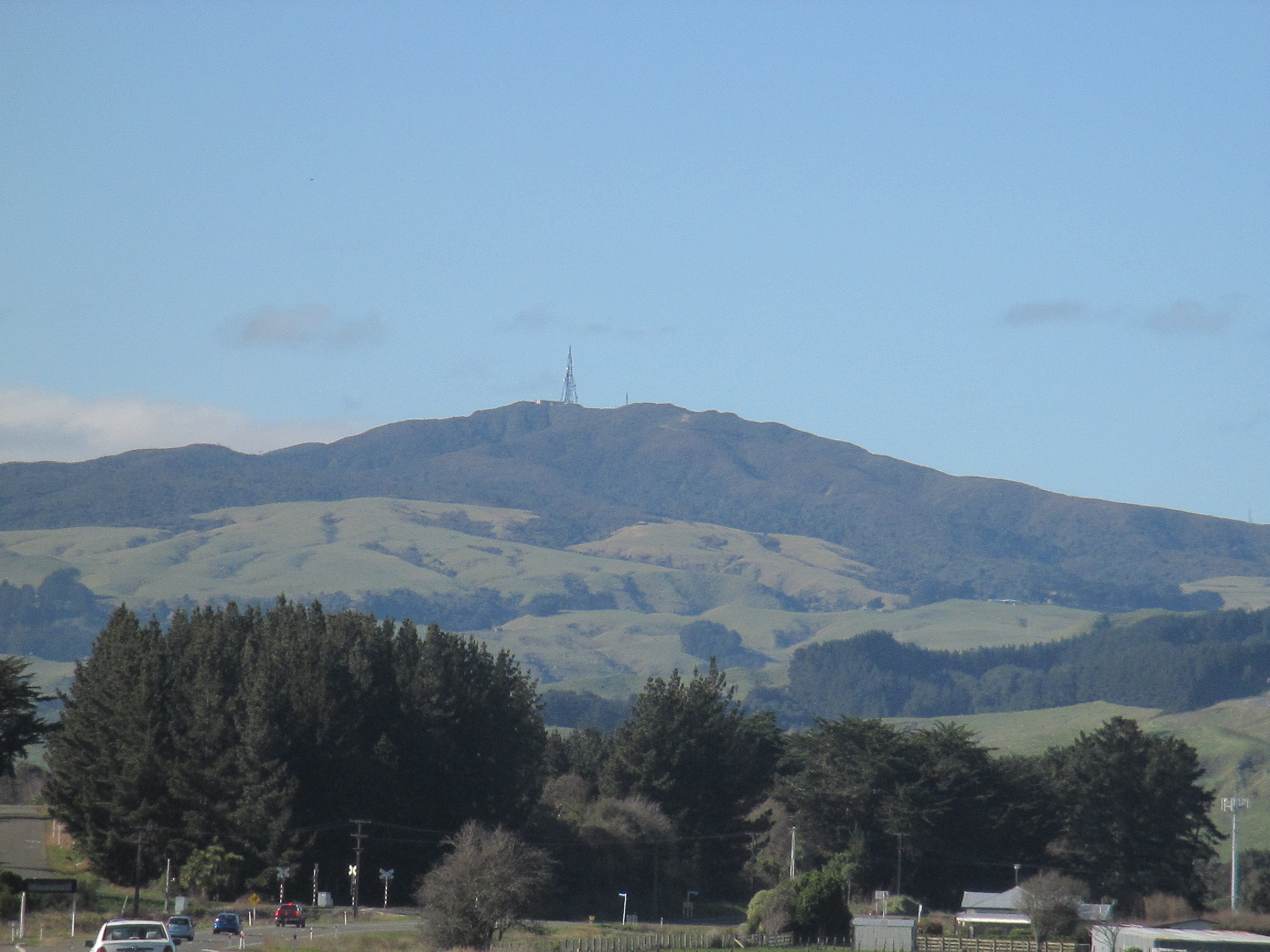
- View of Wharite from near Ashhurst, Manawatū

Highest point
- Elevation: 920 m (3,020 ft)
- Coordinates: 40°15′17″S 175°51′30″E

Geography
- Location within New Zealand
- Location: Manawatū-Whanganui, New Zealand
- Parent range: Ruahine Range

Wharite Peak is a mountain at the southern end of the Ruahine Range, 9 km (5.6 mi) north of Woodville in the Manawatū-Whanganui region of New Zealand. The mountain is home to the main television and FM radio transmitter for the city of Palmerston North and the wider Manawatu region.

== Etymology ==
Wharite is a corruption of either Whare-Iti ("home of Iti") or Whare-tītī ("nesting place of tītī").

According to Rangitāne o Manawatu, Wharite was inhabited by Iti a Tohunga from the Ruakawa Pa area below. The Tohunga was banished to the peak due to his small stature and disfigurements. However, Rangitāne o Manawatu still consulted him for his knowledge related to environmental matters.

== Transmitter ==
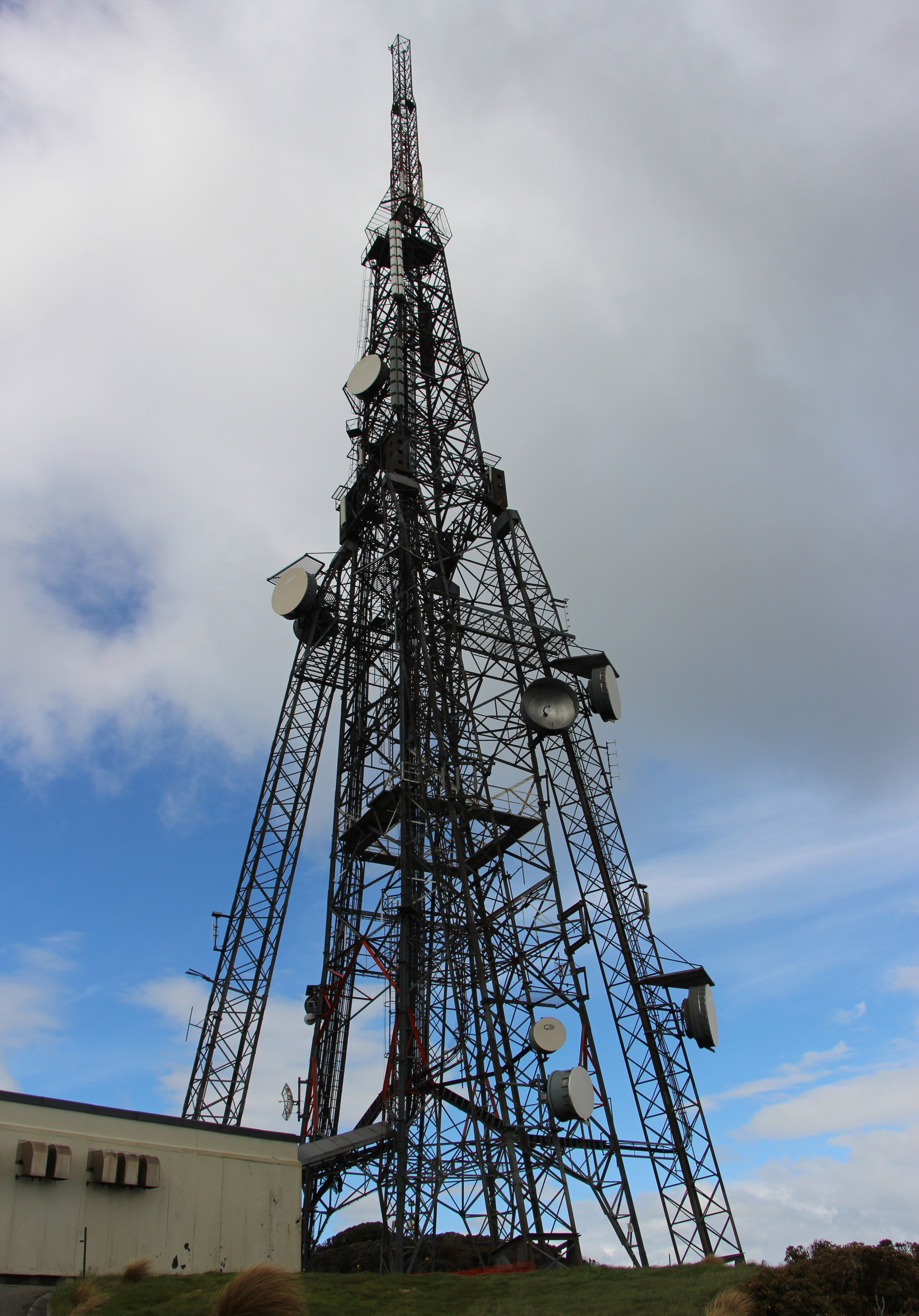
The main Wharite transmission tower

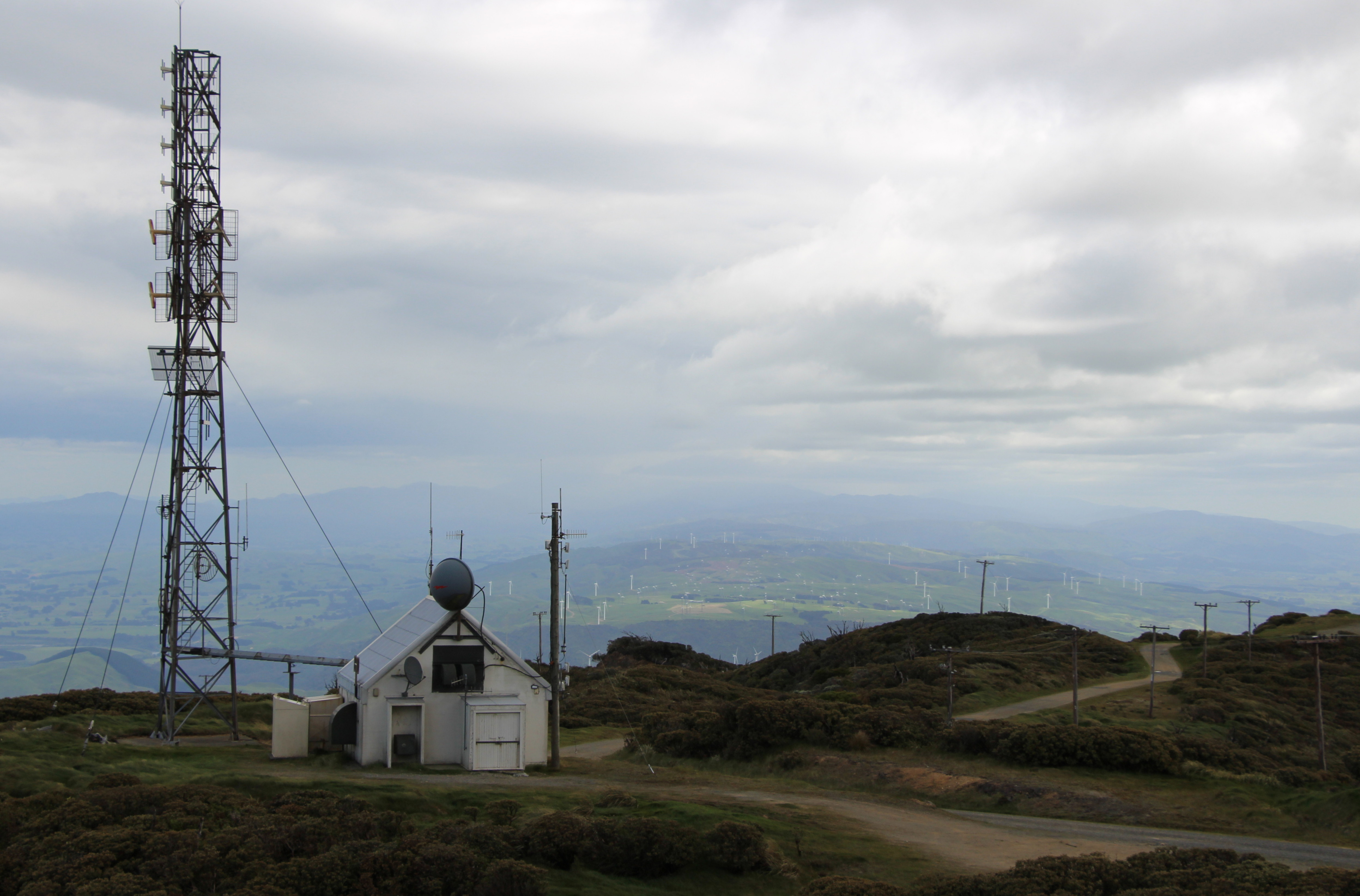
The Wharite South transmitter tower.

A pilot 1 kW television transmitter was established atop Wharite in 1963. The transmitter relayed WNTV1 from Wellington via an intermediate relay station atop Otahoua, near Masterton.

In October 1963, the New Zealand Broadcasting Corporation (NZBC) announced Wharite as one of four sites (along with Waiatarua in Auckland, Mount Te Aroha in Waikato, and Sugarloaf in Christchurch) to receive permanent 100 kW television transmitters. The new 100 kW transmitter and 122-metre (400 ft) transmitter tower came into service on 4 April 1966.

Buttresses were added in 1991 to reinforce the tower, while the tower height was reduced to the present 92 m (302 ft) in the late 2010s after analogue switch-off.

In addition to the main TV/FM tower, there is also a smaller FM-only tower to the south (known as Wharite South).

=== Television frequencies ===
| Television Station | Freeview | Owner | Channel | Frequency | Power (kW) |
|---|---|---|---|---|---|
| HGTV | 19 | Warner Bros. Discovery | 28 | 530.0 MHz | 32 |
| Al Jazeera | 20 | Al Jazeera Media Network | 28 | 530.0 MHz | 32 |
| Shine TV | 25 | Rhema Media | 28 | 530.0 MHz | 32 |
| Hope Channel | 27 | Seventh-day Adventist Church | 28 | 530.0 MHz | 32 |
| Three | 3 | Sky | 32 | 562.0 MHz | 32 |
| Bravo | 4 | Sky | 32 | 562.0 MHz | 32 |
| Eden | 8 | Sky | 32 | 562.0 MHz | 32 |
| Rush | 14 | Sky | 32 | 562.0 MHz | 32 |
| TVNZ 1 | 1 | TVNZ | 34 | 578.0 MHz | 32 |
| TVNZ 2 | 2 | TVNZ | 34 | 578.0 MHz | 32 |
| TVNZ Duke | 6 | TVNZ | 34 | 578.0 MHz | 32 |
| Sky Open | 15 | Sky | 36 | 594.0 MHz | 32 |
| Whakaata Māori | 5 | New Zealand Government | 38 | 610.0 MHz | 32 |
| Te Reo | 10 | New Zealand Government | 38 | 610.0 MHz | 32 |

(Note: The table does not include hour-delayed or music television stations.)

=== Radio frequencies ===
| Radio Station | Owner | Transmit Frequency | Tower | Power (kW) |
|---|---|---|---|---|
| Radio New Zealand Concert | Radio New Zealand | 89.0 MHz | Main | 40 |
| Kia Ora FM | National Māori Radio Network | 89.8 MHz | Main | 1 |
| ZM | New Zealand Media and Entertainment | 90.6 MHz | Main | 40 |
| Radio Rhema | Rhema Media | 91.4 MHz | South | 4 |
| More FM | MediaWorks New Zealand | 92.2 MHz | South | 80 |
| The Edge | MediaWorks New Zealand | 93.0 MHz | South | 5 |
| The Sound | MediaWorks New Zealand | 93.8 MHz | Main | 40 |
| Channel X | MediaWorks New Zealand | 94.6 MHz | South | 5 |
| The Rock | MediaWorks New Zealand | 95.4 MHz | South | 5 |
| Mai FM | MediaWorks New Zealand | 97.0 MHz | South | 5 |
| The Hits | New Zealand Media and Entertainment | 97.8 MHz | Main | 40 |
| The Breeze | MediaWorks New Zealand | 98.6 MHz | South | 8 |
| Newstalk ZB | New Zealand Media and Entertainment | 100.2 MHz | Main | 40 |
| Radio New Zealand National | Radio New Zealand | 101.0 MHz | Main | 8 |
| PMN 531 | Pacific Media Network | 103.4 MHz | South | 8 |
| Magic | MediaWorks New Zealand | 104.2 MHz | South | 5 |
| Coast | New Zealand Media and Entertainment | 105.8 MHz | Main | 12.5 |

=== Former analogue television frequencies ===
The following frequencies were used until 29 September 2013, when Wharite switched off analogue broadcasts (see Digital changeover dates in New Zealand).

| TV Channel | Transmit Channel | Transmit Frequency | Band | Power (kW) |
|---|---|---|---|---|
| TV One | 2V | 55.25 MHz | VHF | 100 |
| TV2 | 4V | 175.25 MHz | VHF | 200 |
| TV3 | 7V | 196.25 MHz | VHF | 100 |
| Four | 11V | 224.25 MHz | VHF | 16 |
| Māori Television | 46V | 671.25 MHz | UHF | 250 |
| Prime | 62V | 799.25 MHz | UHF | 250 |

== Climate ==
Climate data for Wharite Peak (1971–2000)
| Month | Jan | Feb | Mar | Apr | May | Jun | Jul | Aug | Sep | Oct | Nov | Dec | Year |
|---|---|---|---|---|---|---|---|---|---|---|---|---|---|
| Mean daily maximum °C (°F) | 15.3 (59.5) | 15.4 (59.7) | 13.9 (57.0) | 11.0 (51.8) | 8.1 (46.6) | 6.0 (42.8) | 5.2 (41.4) | 5.7 (42.3) | 7.1 (44.8) | 9.4 (48.9) | 11.4 (52.5) | 13.7 (56.7) | 10.2 (50.3) |
| Daily mean °C (°F) | 11.8 (53.2) | 12.0 (53.6) | 10.9 (51.6) | 8.5 (47.3) | 5.9 (42.6) | 4.2 (39.6) | 3.4 (38.1) | 3.5 (38.3) | 4.8 (40.6) | 6.5 (43.7) | 8.3 (46.9) | 10.3 (50.5) | 7.5 (45.5) |
| Mean daily minimum °C (°F) | 8.3 (46.9) | 8.6 (47.5) | 7.9 (46.2) | 6.0 (42.8) | 3.7 (38.7) | 2.5 (36.5) | 1.5 (34.7) | 1.4 (34.5) | 2.4 (36.3) | 3.7 (38.7) | 5.1 (41.2) | 7.0 (44.6) | 4.8 (40.7) |
| Average rainfall mm (inches) | 151 (5.9) | 149 (5.9) | 202 (8.0) | 188 (7.4) | 187 (7.4) | 173 (6.8) | 182 (7.2) | 194 (7.6) | 170 (6.7) | 193 (7.6) | 169 (6.7) | 207 (8.1) | 2,165 (85.3) |
Source: NIWA (rainfall 1951–1980)
