= List of radio stations in the West Coast Region =

This is a list of radio stations in New Zealand's West Coast Region.

Frequency	Station	Format	Location/transmitter	Licensed power (Watts)	Airdate	Previous stations on frequency
87.7 FM	Brian FM	Adult hits	Greymouth (Mawhera Quay)	1	18/03/2026	
88.2 FM	Ceased		Hokitika (Airport)	1		2018 - 2022 Gold 88.2 Hokitika
89.1 FM	Sport Nation	Sports radio	Paparoa	1,585	19/11/2024	SENZ, TAB Trackside (formerly LiveSport, BSport, Radio Pacific)
89.9 FM	ZM	Hit Music	Paparoa	1,585	July 2020	until 30/03/2020 Radio Sport, Newstalk ZB
90.5 FM	The Hits	Adult contemporary	Hari Hari, Whataroa, Franz Josef, Fox Glacier, Haast	8 - 501	10/05/1993	formerly Classic Hits, Radio Scenicland
90.7 FM	The Hits	Adult contemporary	Greymouth (Tainui Steet)	63	01/11/1992	formerly Radio Scenicland previously 91.1FM
91.5 FM	iHeartCountry New Zealand	Country music	Paparoa	1,585	09/05/2025	2018 The Sound (formerly Solid Gold) changed from 91.9 FM; May 2018 The Hits, 06/2018 - 30/06/2020 Mix; 01/07/2020 - 09/05/2025 Gold
92.3 FM	Rhema	Christian radio	Greymouth (Mawhera Quay)	63		
93.1 FM	The Hits	Adult contemporary	Paparoa	3,981	01/11/1992	formerly Classic Hits, Radio Scenicland
93.9 FM	Sport Nation	Sports radio	Greymouth	63	19/11/2024	SENZ, TAB Trackside (formerly LiveSport, BSport, Radio Pacific)
94.5 FM	Coast FM	Adult contemporary	Franz Josef	79		
94.7 FM	Life FM	Christian radio	Greymouth (Mawhera Quay)	63		
95.5 FM	RNZ Concert	Classical music	Paparoa	1,585	2004	1996 - 2004 RNZ National
97.1 FM	iHeartCountry New Zealand	Country music	Greymouth	100	09/02/2025	2007 Solid Gold, 2012 The Sound, May 2018 The Hits; 06/2018 - 30/06/2020 Mix, 01/07/2020 - 09/05/2025 Gold
97.1 FM	The Hits	Adult contemporary	Hokitika (Cement Lead Road Reservoir)	1,585		2007 Solid Gold, 2012 The Sound, May 2018 The Hits; 06/2018 - 30/06/2020 Mix
97.9 FM	Brian FM	Adult hits	Sewell Peak	1,585	18/03/2026	Until 18/03/2026 Coast FM previously 98.3FM until 2011
99.5 FM	Coast FM	Adult contemporary	Sewell Peak	1,585	1995	
100.3 FM	Coast FM	Adult contemporary	Hokitika, Kaniere	2,512	1998	
101.1 FM	RNZ National	Public Radio	Paparoa	2,512	2004	was on 101.5 FM until October 2010
103.5 FM	Newstalk ZB	Talk radio	Paparoa	3,981		
104.3 FM	Sanctuary	Christian radio	Greymouth (Mawhera Quay)	63	14/02/2025	Until 14/02/2025 Star rebranded
105.1 FM	Radio Hauraki	Rock music	Paparoa	3,981		
105.9 FM	Newstalk ZB	Talk radio	Greymouth	100	May 2018	2018 Magic
105.9 FM	Newstalk ZB	Talk radio	Hokitika (Cement Lead Road Reservoir)	1,585	2018	2018 Magic
107.0 FM	3ABN	Christian radio	Greymouth LPFM	1		
107.5 FM	Coast FM	Adult contemporary	Greymouth (Mawhera Quay)	1		

This is a list of radio stations in the Buller District.

Frequency	Station	Format	Location/transmitter	Licensed power (Watts)	Airdate	Previous stations on frequency
88.0 FM	RNZ National	Public radio	Reefton LPFM	1		
89.3 FM	Radio Hauraki	Rock music	Westport, Mt Rochfort	1,585	2019	2018 The Hits
90.1 FM	Brian FM	Adult hits	Westport, Mt Rochfort	500	18/03/2026	20/03/2022 Magic Talk, 21/03/2022 - late 2022 Today FM
90.3 FM	Coast FM	Adult contemporary	Reefton	501	1995	
90.9 FM	The Hits	Adult contemporary	Westport, Mt Rochfort	501	01/11/1992	formerly Classic Hits, Radio Scenicland
91.7 FM	ZM	Hit Music	Westport, Mt Rochfort	1,585	July 2020	2018 The Hits, 2019 - 30/03/2020 Radio Sport, Newstalk ZB
92.5 FM	iHeartCountry New Zealand	Country music	Westport, Mt Rochfort	501	09/05/2025	2018 The Sound, 2018 The Hits; 2019 - 30/06/2020 Mix, 01/07/2020 - 09/05/2025 Gold
93.3 FM	Sport Nation	Sports radio	Westport, Mt Rochfort	1,585	19/11/2024	TAB Trackside (formerly LiveSport, BSport, Radio Pacific)
94.9 FM	Rhema	Christian radio	Westport (Waterworks Road)	794		
95.7 FM	Newstalk ZB	Talk radio	Westport, Mt Rochfort	501	2018	Magic
95.9 FM	Rhema	Christian radio	Reefton	794		
96.5 FM	Coast FM	Adult contemporary	Westport, Mt Rochfort	1,585	1995	
97.5 FM	The Hits	Adult contemporary	Reefton	794	01/11/1992	formerly Classic Hits, Radio Scenicland
98.9 FM	RNZ Concert	Classical music	Westport, Mt Rochfort	501	1990	
99.3 FM	Coast FM	Adult contemporary	Karamea	1,585	1995	
99.9 FM	iHeartCountry New Zealand	Country music	Reefton	794	09/05/2025	2018 The Sound, 2018 The Hits; 2019 - 30/06/2020 Mix, 01/07/2020 - 09/05/2025 Gold
103.7 FM	Sanctuary	Christian radio	Westport (Waterworks Road)	794	14/02/2025	Until 14/02/2025 Star rebranded
104.5 FM	Life FM	Christian radio	Westport (Waterworks Road)	794		
106.1 FM	Brian FM	Adult contemporary/Classic rock	Westport (Stockton)	794		
107.0 FM	Radio Rock FM	Rock music	Reefton LPFM	1		
1287 AM	Newstalk ZB	Talk radio	Westport Cape Foulwind	6,310	2007	1968 - 2007 Classic Hits Scenicland FM, Radio Scenicland
1458 AM	RNZ National	Public Radio	Westport Cape Foulwind	6,310		
