= List of radio stations in Marlborough =

This is a list of radio stations in Marlborough in New Zealand.

Frequency	Station	Format	Location/Transmitter	Licensed kW	Airdate	Previous Stations on Frequency
87.8 FM	KAOS FM	Active rock	Blenheim, LPFM		2017	
88.9 FM	Fresh FM	Access radio	Blenheim (Goulters Hill)	0.1		
89.1 FM	The Rock	Active rock	Kaikōura (Kaikōura Peninsula)	0.16		20 March 2022: Magic Talk; 21 March 2022 – 30 March 2023: Today FM
89.1 FM	The Hits	Adult contemporary music	Picton (Picton)	0.16		Classic Hits
89.7 FM	The Breeze	Easy listening	Blenheim (Wither Hills)	0.8		Easy FM
89.9 FM	More FM	Adult contemporary music	Kaikōura (Kaikōura Peninsula)	0.16		Sounds FM previously 90.3
90.5 FM	ZM	Contemporary hit radio	Blenheim (Cavalier House)	0.16		
90.7 FM	Tahu FM	Urban contemporary	Kaikōura	0.16		
91.3 FM	The Rock	Active rock	Blenheim (Wither Hills)	0.8		
91.5 FM	Life FM	Contemporary Christian music	Picton (Mt Freeth)	0.16		
91.5 FM	The Hits (relay of Christchurch Station)	Adult contemporary music	Kaikōura (Kaikōura Peninsula)	0.08	2017	
92.1 FM	Newstalk ZB	Talk radio	Blenheim (Cavalier House)	0.16		
92.3 FM	The Rock	Active rock	Picton (Mt Freeth)	0.16		Radio Live; 2019 – 20 March 2022: Magic Talk; 21 March 2022 – 30 March 2023: Today FM
92.9 FM	More FM	Adult contemporary radio	Blenheim (Wither Hills)	0.8		Sounds FM – main Blenheim transmitter
93.7 FM	Life FM	Contemporary Christian music	Blenheim (Wither Hills)	0.8		
94.5 FM	Coast	Easy listening	Blenheim (Cavalier House)	0.16	Aug 2018	Radio Hauraki
94.7 FM	More FM	Adult contemporary music	Picton (Mt Freeth)	0.16		Sounds FM Previously 94.5
95.3 FM	Channel X	Classic alternative	Blenheim (Wither Hills)	0.8	8 May 2023	Radio Live; Jan 2019 – 20 March 2022: Magic Talk; 21 March 2022 – 30 March 2023: Today FM
96.1 FM	The Sound	Classic rock	Blenheim (Wither Hills)	0.8		Easy FM
96.9 FM	The Hits	Adult contemporary music	Blenheim (Wither Hills)	2.5		Classic Hits, Radio Marlborough
97.1 FM	The Breeze	Easy listening	Kaikōura (Kaikōura Peninsula)	0.16		Easy FM
98.5 FM	Radio Hauraki	Active rock	Blenheim (Cavalier House)	0.16		30 March 2020: Radio Sport; Newstalk ZB
98.7 FM	The Breeze	Easy listening	Picton (Mt Freeth)	0.16		Easy FM Previously 98.6
99.3 FM	RNZ Concert	Public radio	Blenheim (Wither Hills)	0.8		
100.1 FM	Brian FM	Adult hits	Havelock (Takorika)	0.8		
100.3 FM	Brian FM	Adult hits	Kaikōura (Maui Street)	0.5		
100.9 FM	Brian FM	Adult Hits	Blenheim (Wither Hills)	0.8		
101.7 FM	RNZ National	Public radio	Blenheim (Wither Hills)	0.8		
103.5 FM	Rhema	Christian radio	Picton (Mt Freeth)	0.16		
104.1 FM	Rhema	Christian radio	Blenheim (Wither Hills)	0.8		
104.3 FM	Brian FM	Adult hits	Seddon/Awatere Valley (Stevens Hill)	0.32		
104.9 FM	The Edge	Contemporary hit radio	Blenheim (Wither Hills)	0.8		
105.1 FM	Rhema	Christian radio	Kaikōura (Kaikōura Peninsula)	0.16		
105.7 FM	Breeze Classic	1970s	Blenheim (Wither Hills)	0.8	1 November 2025	until 31 October 2025: Magic
105.9 FM	Brian FM	Adult hits	Picton (Mt Freeth)	0.16		
105.9 FM	Brian FM	Adult hits	Ōkiwi Bay/French Pass (Croisilles Ridge)	0.1	24 September 2019	
105.9 FM	Brian FM	Adult hits	Ward (Hollow Top)	0.32		
106.5 FM	Reelworld Radio	Pop music	Blenheim (Wither Hills)	0.8	Sept 2018	
107.1 FM	Brayshaw FM	Vintage Oldies	Blenheim, LPFM			
107.7 FM	The Overcomer	Religious	Blenheim, LPFM			
107.9 FM Unlicensed	Radio Rock FM	Rock	Blenheim, LPFM			
