= Coastline FM =

Radio station in Spain

Coastline FM is an English language radio station in the Costa del Sol region of Spain. It was started in 1989.

The station serves expatriate communities in Southern Spain, playing Feel Good Music, local information and local news. It serves Málaga province, the Axarquia region and Guadalhorce Valley.
