= Mount Murchison (Canterbury) =

Mountain in Canterbury Region, New Zealand

- Location within New Zealand

Highest point
- Elevation: 2,408 m (7,900 ft)
- Prominence: 1,169 m (3,835 ft)
- Listing: New Zealand #101
- Coordinates: 43°00′14″S 171°22′37″E

Geography
- Location: South Island, New Zealand
- Parent range: Shaler Range, Southern Alps
- Topo map(s): BV19 – Lake Kaniere, LINZ

Climbing
- First ascent: C.K. Ward and A.E. Talbot 1913.
- Easiest route: From the northwest over the White Glacier

Mount Murchison is a mountain in the Southern Alps in the Canterbury region of New Zealand. It is the highest point of the Shaler Range, which runs approximately north–south to the east of the Wilberforce River. A col to the east of the peak separates two glaciers, the Kahutea Glacier to the south and the White Glacier to the Northeast.

Mount Murchison is named after Roderick Murchison, one of the founders of the Royal Geographical Society.
