= Kaimata =

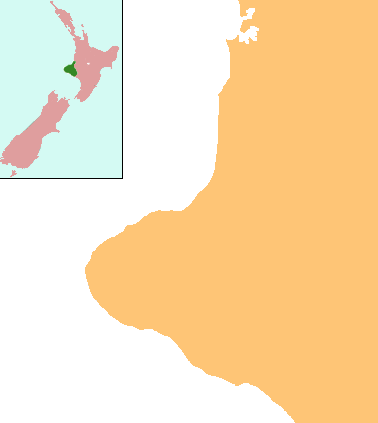
- Coordinates: 39°9′44″S 174°17′35″E
- Country: New Zealand
- Region: Taranaki
- District: New Plymouth District

Population (2006)
  - Total: 2,601

Kaimata is a locality in Taranaki, New Zealand. Inglewood is about 7.5 km to the west. The Manganui River flows past to the west. Kaimata was one of many townships established to service the dairy industry.

The New Zealand Ministry for Culture and Heritage gives a translation of "eat raw food" for Kaimata.

According to the 2013 New Zealand census, the Kaimata statistical area has a population of 2,778, an increase of 177 people since the 2006 census. There were 1,428 males and 1,353 females. Figures have been rounded and may not add up to totals. The statistical area covers a large region around and to the east of Inglewood, not just the locality of Kaimata.

== Education ==
Kaimata School is a coeducational full primary (years 1–8) school with a roll of 115 students as of November 2024.
