= George FM =

New Zealand dance music radio station

- New Zealand

Programming
- Format: Dance radio

Ownership
- Owner: MediaWorks New Zealand

History
- First air date: 1998

Links
- Webcast: Live stream
- Website: Official website

George FM is a New Zealand dance music radio station, owned and operated by MediaWorks from its Hargreaves Street headquarters and relayed on Freeview and radio frequencies around New Zealand. Its seventy-five regular presenters and additional guest presenters host the station's twenty-four-hour mix of house, breaks, drum and bass, dubstep, electro, soul, downbeat, jazz, funk, indie rock, hip-hop and other dance and electronic music.

The network was set up as a volunteer-run low power station based in a Grey Lynn spare bedroom in 1998 by Thane Kirby and his brother, Richard Kirby. It became a commercial station with paid staff by 2003, began to be relayed to other centres in subsequent years, became a Freeview station on 1 May 2008 and was bought out by MediaWorks on 16 February 2009. It continues to retain a laid-back style: news is limited to informal news, weather, traffic and surf reports hourly during breakfast and drive shows and the choice of music and presenting style is entirely that of programme hosts.

== Stations ==
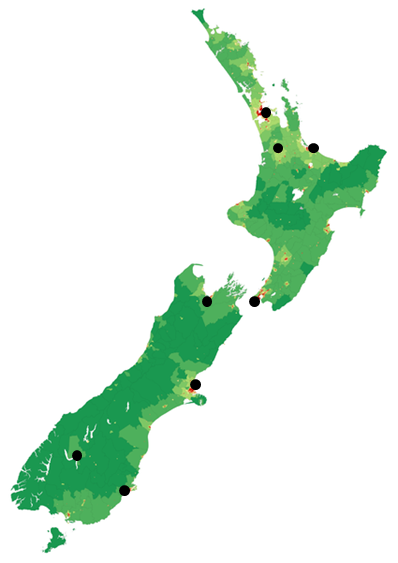
This is a map of George FM frequencies operating in 2016.

George FM broadcasts a network programme on full-power FM and low-power FM frequencies. It also broadcasts via the Freeview and Rova platforms.

It was previously available on low-power frequencies in Whangārei, Rotorua, Taupō, Napier, New Plymouth, Whanganui, Te Anau and Invercargill. The network has retained low-power broadcasts in Hamilton, Tauranga, Palmerston North, and Wellington, and has full-power broadcasts in Auckland, Nelson, Dunedin, Queenstown and Christchurch.

=== Frequencies ===
- Auckland 96.6 FM
- Hamilton 104.2 FM
- Tauranga 107.4 FM (low-power)
- Palmerston North 107.1 FM (low-power)
- Lower Hutt 1449 kHz C-QUAM AM Stereo (Licensed medium power Private Rebroadcast)
- Wellington 106.7 FM (low-power)
- Nelson 95.2 FM
- Christchurch 95.3 FM
- Dunedin 96.6 FM
- Queenstown 96.8 FM
- Freeview channel 70

== Controversy ==
=== Broadcasting standards breaches ===
In December 2014, the Broadcasting Standards Authority (BSA) upheld a complaint against George FM Breakfast for unfair treatment of a named individual, Te Rama Durie, during a May 2014 broadcast that mocked his use of the dating app Tinder and aired a phone conversation with him without consent. Although the broadcaster initially upheld the fairness complaint and aired an apology, the BSA found the apology was insufficient—lacking formality and specificity—and ordered a new on-air statement including an apology.

In March 2016, the BSA upheld a complaint regarding the George FM Breakfast show broadcast on 10 September 2015. The hosts asked listeners to submit the names and profiles of female Instagram users described as “do-nothing bitches.” Two women (A and B) were named. The hosts made inappropriate and disparaging comments about A’s profile, and also contacted and interviewed her on air. The BSA found that the action taken by MediaWorks in response to earlier complaints was insufficient, and that the broadcast breached the privacy of both women, as well as the fairness and good taste and decency standards. George FM was ordered to pay $4,000 in compensation to A, $2,000 to B, and $2,000 in costs to the Crown.
