= Flava (radio station) =

Radio station in New Zealand

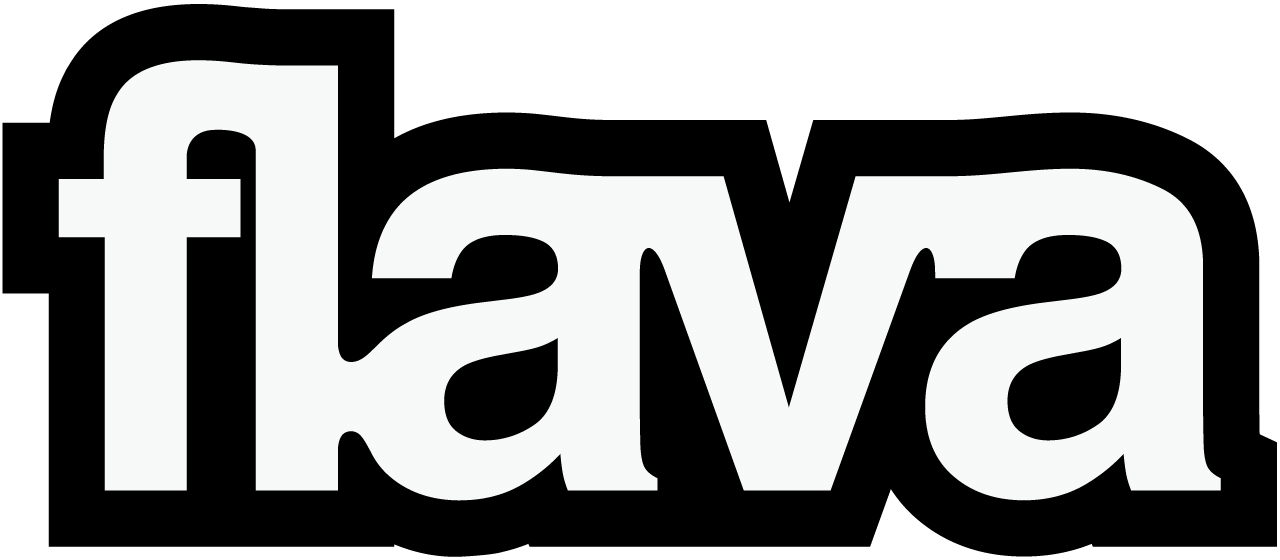
- New Zealand
- Broadcast area: 6 markets in New Zealand

Programming
- Format: Classic hip hop

Ownership
- Owner: NZME Radio

Links
- Webcast: iHeartRadio stream
- Website: flava.co.nz

Flava (formerly Cool Blue 96.1) is a New Zealand classic hip hop and R&B music radio network. The network is owned by NZME Radio, and is operated and produced from the company's Auckland offices and studios on Graham Street. It competes directly with MediaWorks New Zealand's Auckland long-running modern urban music station Mai FM.

Flava's current on-air lineup includes K'Lee, Azura Lane, Charlie Pome'e, Hadleigh Pouesi (Hadz) and DJ09.

The Flava brand reaches an estimated 175,100 listeners every week, with 13,900 average weekly unique visitors to its website and about 228,000 likes on its Facebook page. The network claims to provide "fresh and funky beats" for "urban consumers", with a focus on the metropolitan and cosmopolitan culture of Generation Y. The target audience is educated, upwardly-mobile with strong family ties and a community orientation. It is under 35 with a female skew. The station features advertising for concerts, cars, phones and other consumer brands.

Flava broadcasts classic hip hop and R&B music. The network features music from artists like Missy Elliott, Rihanna, Vic Mensa, Kanye West, Mariah Carey, Dr. Dre, Juicy J, Nicki Minaj, Beyoncé, Timbaland, Ciara, Wiz Khalifa and Chris Brown. It also promotes local New Zealand artists, like Six60, Sons of Zion, Tomorrow People. A competition in 2011 invited listeners to record over tracks, for the chance to have to the track professionally recorded and played on Flava.

== History ==
=== Cool Blue 96.1FM ===
Flava began as Cool Blue 96.1FM.

Flava began as Cool Blue 96.1FM, broadcasting on 96.1 FM in Auckland between 2001 and 2004. Unlike other radio stations operated by The Radio Network, Cool Blue was only available in the Auckland region and was not networked to other regions.

Weeks after Cool Blue was replaced by Flava, a similar Cool Blue station resumed broadcasting online as an independent non-commercial non-profit internet-only radio station, located in Taupo. It played jazz and blues music with some elements of R&B, rock and roll and folk music.

=== Flava ===
The existing Auckland frequency of Cool Blue became Flava in 2004. It moved to 95.8 FM in July 2010, one of dozens of frequencies to change ahead of the Ministry of Economic Development's reallocation of frequencies under new 20-year license management rights in April 2011. Flava was launched in Napier in 2004, but was replaced by Easy Mix in April 2012, and replaced again with Radio Sport when Easy Mix was closed in June 2012. The Radio Network brought the network back in March 2013, in response to what they said was strong demand from the public and advertisers.

By 2013, the station had frequencies in Northland, Auckland, Tauranga, Napier and Christchurch, and its Rotorua station was the most popular station in its market. Former content director Christian Boston says there had been requests for Flava stations from Dunedin to the Gold Coast, and the station was particularly popular with teenage listeners adopting new radio brand loyalties. He said people had offered to establish low power transmitters on their houses. The station launched in Wellington at midday on 19 July 2013, with 4000 songs being broadcast back-to-back on the frequency. However in January 2015 the station was removed from Wellington's airwaves, and the 104.5FM frequency previously used by Flava became the new frequency for George FM.

== Stations ==
=== Frequencies ===
- Whangārei – 106.0 FM
- Auckland – 95.8 FM
- Tauranga – 99.0 FM
- Rotorua – 89.5 FM
- Christchurch – 93.3 FM
- Wellington – 93.7 FM

== Other services ==
=== Events and promotions ===
The network sponsors rugby league events, including being the official radio station of the New Zealand Warriors. It has been the official radio station of Auckland Council's Matariki celebrations for many years, and sponsored the construction of a giant poppy at Auckland Domain on Anzac Day in 2015. The network has sponsored a range of Auckland concerts, including the 2Clean Album Release Party in 2013, a Nelly tour later the same year, and a Soulfest music festival featuring Lauryn Hill, Miguel and Mary J. Blige in 2015.

Flava carries out a range of promotional activities with promotional vehicles. One was a Hummer with branded exterior and eight fitted stereo speakers. Another was a Nissan Pathfinder with subwoofers, speakers and audio video gear encased in a custom fibreglass enclosure. The network has also supported local events in other parts of the country, including the 2014 Flava Rotorua Foam Party and the 2015 Loaded Tough Guy and Gal physical challenge.

=== News and information ===
Flava broadcasts its news, sports, and traffic updates from the NZME newsroom every hour during breakfast, presented by Brin Rudkin (6am-8am inclusive).

In 2008, it trialled the use of two "feels like" indexes in its weather forecasts — wind chill reflecting the temperature of moving air, and humidex reflecting heat and humidity. Forecaster Philip Duncan defended his decision to use the indexes, arguing people would be more interested in those measures than the day time high when deciding what to do or wear.

=== Website and social media ===
The official Flava website includes event guides, music videos, topical videos, entertainment news, prizes and event pictures. Flava streams live on iHeartRadio. It also operates the Flava Old School station, available exclusively on iHeartRadio. The station features old-school hip hop and classic R&B like Tupac, Biggie, TLC, Aaliyah, Sir Mix-a-Lot, Missy Elliott, Ice Cube and Salt-N-Pepa, and is aimed at older listeners who may not find Flava's music line-up appealing.
