= Classic alternative =

Radio format

Classic alternative is a radio format focusing on alternative music from the late 1970s to mid 2000s, with particular focus on the early days of MTV.

== Background ==
Some stations with an "all-'80s" format have added elements of the 1980s and '90s classic alternative format to their regular playlist. Cox's KHPT in Houston and WPOI in Tampa are prime examples of all-'80s stations that heavily relied on artists such as Peter Schilling, The Cranberries and New Order. KHPT flipped to a classic alternative format after its run as an all-'80s station. The same goes for KJAQ in Seattle, one of the first stations in the country to try this format.

Digital cable music service Music Choice (originally DMX) provided a station labelled New Wave for several years. The station was later renamed "Retro-Active", and later Classic Alternative, all of which played seventies to eighties new wave, post-punk, synthpop, etc. After several years, the station filtered in 1990s (and even sometimes post-millennium) artists. However, an artist like David Bowie can often fit in classic alternative because he meets the criteria.

SiriusXM offers a classic alternative station, 1st Wave, which was launched in 2008 following the merger between Sirius and XM and replaced similar stations on both services.

The format began to see wider adoption in late-2022 and 2023, particularly among stations and brands that have had a legacy in modern and active rock formats in their respective market. In December 2022, WNNX in Atlanta relaunched the heritage "99X" brand of sister station WWWQ as a classic alternative station, while in July 2024, Corus Entertainment extended its Edge brand—long associated with its heritage modern rock station CFNY-FM in Toronto—to Calgary's CFGQ-FM using a classic alternative format (positioned as "Iconic Alternative"). In October, Corus then switched its Winnipeg active rock station CJKR-FM to classic alternative, while CFNY followed suit in April 2026.
