= Today FM (New Zealand) =

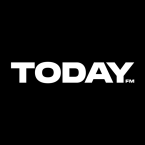
- New Zealand
- Broadcast area: 28 markets in New Zealand

Programming
- Format: Talk radio

Ownership
- Owner: MediaWorks New Zealand

History
- First air date: 21 March 2022; 4 years ago
- Last air date: 30 March 2023; 3 years ago

Links
- Webcast: www.todayfm.co.nz/home/player.html
- Website: todayfm.co.nz

Today FM was a nationwide Auckland-based New Zealand talkback, news and sport radio network owned and operated by MediaWorks New Zealand. It was formed by the 2022 rebrand of Magic Talk and competed directly against NZME station Newstalk ZB. It was taken off air on 30 March 2023.

== History ==
In November 2021, MediaWorks announced it would replace Magic Talk with a new talk radio network called Today FM. Newshub's political editor at the time, Tova O'Brien, was announced as breakfast host, with broadcasters Duncan Garner, Rachel Smalley, Polly Gillespie, Leah Panapa, Mark Richardson, Lloyd Burr, Wilhelmina Shrimpton, Nigel Yalden, Robett Hollis, Mark Dye, Carly Flynn, Nickson Clark, Dave Letele and Dominic Bowden in the lineup.

The Today FM brand name has been used in other regions, such as 89.3 Today FM, which was founded as a local station in the Wairarapa by Paul Henry in 1991, and Today 92FM (later Today 99.8FM), which was a local station in Auckland in the 1990s. Henry would later become the "voice" of the new station.

Today FM was launched on 21 March 2022 and commenced broadcasting on the former Magic Talk frequencies, plus 90.2 FM in Auckland (moving The Rock to 106.2 FM) and 95.3 FM in Christchurch (moving Mai FM to the low-power frequency of 106.8 FM). The first programme to be aired on the station was First Light, presented by Rachel Smalley.

The station was abruptly taken off air on 30 March 2023, just over a year after it launched. During the mid-morning show Duncan Garner Today, O'Brien and other Today FM staff came on air to announce they were being shuttered. Garner and O'Brien went onto criticise station owners Mediaworks, before the show was replaced by music at 9:25 am that morning. At 5:12 pm, a pre-recorded announcement was aired, confirming the closure of Today FM.

Staff were told the annual costs of producing the station were around $7.5 million, but that projected revenue would only "land at about $6-6.5 million".

Specialty shows that aired on Today FM such as the Rural Exchange show and coverage of the Blackcaps cricket matches continued after the closure on the same frequencies. REX (Rural Exchange) ran at their normal times until they were moved to Magic on 17 April. For the cricket, the New Zealand versus Sri Lanka game on 8 April 2023 was the final match covered.

== News bulletins ==
News and sports bulletins were broadcast live every hour, on the hour, and produced in a shorter, snappier format with headline summaries as the major stories developed. The news was provided by the station's own newsroom with over 20 news and sports journalists, editors and correspondents. Network newsreaders included Carly Flynn (breakfast) and Wilhelmina Shrimpton (drive), with Bridget Hastie, Geoff Bryan, Aroha Hathaway, Angie Skerrett, Brin Rudkin, KM Adams and Mel Homer.

== Frequencies ==
Today FM broadcast in 26 markets. Most of Today FM's frequencies were reallocated to other MediaWorks radio stations.

Region/Place	Frequency	Replaced by	Consequential changes
Mid-Northland	100.7	The Breeze	
Whangārei	90.8	The Breeze	
Auckland	90.2	The Rock	The Rock 106.2: Channel X
Auckland	702 AM	Humm FM	
Waikato	100.2	Magic	Magic 104.2: Channel X
Tauranga	100.6	Channel X	
Rotorua	95.1	Channel X	
Whakatāne	92.1	The Breeze	
Reporoa	98.0	Mai FM	
Gisborne	94.9	The Breeze	
Hawke's Bay	106.3	Channel X	
Whanganui	96.0	Mai FM	
Manawatū	93.8	The Sound	The Sound 94.6: Channel X
Kāpiti/Horowhenua	99.1	Channel X	
Wairarapa	98.3	Channel X	
Wellington	98.9	Magic	Magic 104.5: Channel X
Wellington	1233 AM	The Breeze	
Nelson	96.0	Channel X	
Picton	92.3	The Rock	
Blenheim	95.3	Channel X	
Kaikōura	89.1	The Rock	
Christchurch	95.3	George FM	
Christchurch	738 AM	The Breeze	
Timaru	105.9	Channel X	
Mackenzie Country (Tekapo and Twizel)	91.0	The Rock	
Oamaru	100.8	Channel X	
Queenstown	91.2	Channel X	
Alexandra	95.9	Magic	
Dunedin	96.6	George FM	
Southland	94.0	Channel X	
