= Gold (New Zealand radio network) =

Music radio station in New Zealand

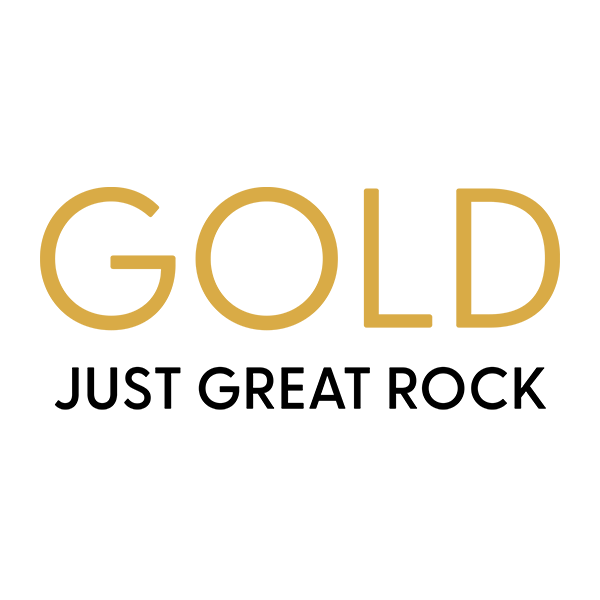
- New Zealand
- Frequency: Various
- Branding: All the Greatest Hits (2020–2023); Just Great Rock (2023–2025)

Programming
- Language: English
- Format: Classic rock

Ownership
- Owner: NZME

History
- First air date: 1 July 2020; 6 years ago

Links
- Webcast: Livestream
- Website: Official website

Gold (stylised as GOLD) is an online radio station streaming classic hits and classic rock of the late 1960s–1990s and is owned and operated by New Zealand Media and Entertainment (NZME).

The defunct station Gold Sport was previously broadcast on AM and low-power FM frequencies across New Zealand. Its head office and studios were in central Auckland, alongside NZME's other radio networks.

== History ==
Gold went to air on 1 July 2020, taking over the FM frequencies held by Mix and the AM and low power FM frequencies previously used to broadcast Radio Sport.

Gold is a pure music format targeting an audience of listeners above 45 years of age., while the AM/LPFM version carried a hybrid talk/sports/music format.

On 17 June 2022, NZME announced that, after nearly two years, Gold AM would change its name to Gold Sport from 27 June 2022. The name change reflected what was broadcast on the station which included live sport commentary, The Country with Jamie Mackay and The Country Sport Breakfast with Brian Kelly.

On 2 May 2025, NZME announced that it was introducing a new country radio station that would start broadcasting on most of Gold's frequencies from 9 May. Gold became an online-only iHeartRadio station on 9 May, ceasing to broadcast terrestrially on FM, while AM frequencies remained shared with sports coverage.

Gold Sport's music programme changed from the Classic rock format to Country music in December 2025. Gold Sport was re-branded iHeartCountry on 4 May 2026. Sports commentaries are broadcast on selected AM frequencies of sister station Newstalk ZB.

== Programmes ==
Gold is an online, 24/7 music only station with no shows.

Gold Sport's regular shows were The Country Sport Breakfast with Brian Kelly, and The Country with Jamie Mackay, along with live sport commentary including Super Rugby, All Blacks tests, and ANZ Premiership netball. Outside of these programmes, Gold Sport simulcast Gold (on AM and some LPFM frequencies).

== Stations ==
Gold Sport used to broadcast on AM and low power FM frequencies across New Zealand. Some frequencies were reallocated to iHeartCountry, some to Newstalk ZB and some have ceased such as 1332 Auckland and 1503 Christchurch. Gold is streamed on iHeartRadio.

=== Former Gold Sport frequencies ===
- Whangārei – 729 AM
- Auckland – 1332 AM
- Waikato – 792 AM
- Tauranga – 1521 AM
- Taupō – 107.7 FM (low power)
- New Plymouth – 774 AM / 87.8 FM (low power)
- South Taranaki −1557 AM / 88.2 FM (low power)
- Napier – 1125 AM
- Whanganui – 1062 AM
- Palmerston North – 88.0 FM (low power)
- Masterton – 87.6 FM (low power)
- Wellington – 1503 AM
- Nelson – 1341 AM
- Christchurch – 1503 AM
- Ashburton – 702 AM
- Timaru – 1494 AM
- Dunedin – 693 AM
- Southland – 558 AM
