= Mai FM =

New Zealand radio station

- New Zealand
- Broadcast area: New Zealand
- Frequency: 88.6 FM - 106.8 FM
- Branding: "The Hottest Hip-hop and R&B"

Programming
- Format: Urban contemporary

Ownership
- Owner: MediaWorks New Zealand

History
- First air date: July 1992

Links
- Webcast: Live stream
- Website: Official website

Mai FM is New Zealand's largest urban contemporary radio network, promoting Māori language and culture and broadcasting hip hop and rhythm and blues. It is located in Auckland, and is available in twelve markets around the country. The network targets 15- to 34-year-olds, and reaches an estimated 460,600 different listeners each week.

== History ==
Mai FM began broadcasting to Auckland in July 1992. The first breakfast host was Robert Rakete, now a host on The Breeze. It was run by one of the largest Māori iwi in New Zealand, Ngāti Whātua, and Mai Media. Mai FM was founded by Taura Eruera and Vivian Sutherland-Bridgwater. Between 1996 and 2005 Mai FM also operated a second station, Ruia Mai, on 1179 AM in Auckland with all programming in the Māori language.

From 1996 to 2001 Mai FM could be heard in Christchurch on 90.5 FM, due to an agreement between Ngāti Whātua and the Kāi Tahu iwi. The Christchurch station was originally 90.5 Tahu FM, with local on air talent, and formatted with the Mai FM Auckland music. In late 2001 the joint agreement ended and the Mai FM branding of the station in Christchurch ceased, reverting to its original name of Tahu FM. In 1996 Ngāti Whatua also came to an agreement with the Te Arawa iwi to broadcast Mai FM in Rotorua on 96.7 FM, over the years the frequency changed to 99.1 and is now broadcasting on 105.5.

Previous logo with slogan.

On 29 February 2008 it was announced that MediaWorks New Zealand had bought the station and would take it over on 31 March 2008. Since the MediaWorks' takeover there has been significant programming and branding changes as well as the creation of the Mai FM network.

== Current hosts ==
- Tegan Yorwarth, Fame Teu, and Nickson Clark on Mai Morning Crew
- Storme Hitaua on Mai Days
- Nate Nauer and Randy Sjafrie with Producer Shay Cunningham on Mai Home Run
- Desch Toalepai on Mai Nights

== Programming ==
Mai FM is a networked station with all shows and music broadcasting from its Auckland studios.

The Mai Hot 1000 is one of the station's annual countdown features. The chart order, including which artists and songs feature, is voted by listeners on the station's official website. The countdown runs on weekdays over a three-week period started in 2013 as The Mai Hot 500 according to their official Instagram page. It was renamed The Mai Hot 900 in 2014 and expanded by 300 songs in 2020. Then in 2022 it had 200 songs removed due to the launch of The Mai Hip Hop 100 and The Mai RnB 100 Countdowns.

=== Winners ===
- 2026 - J. Cole - "No Role Modelz"
- 2025 - Kendrick Lamar - "Not Like Us"
- 2023 - 2pac - "California Love"
- 2022 - J. Cole - "No Role Modelz"
- 2021 - TLC - "No Scrubs"
- 2020 - 2pac - "Changes"
- 2019 - The Notorious B.I.G - "Juicy"
- 2018 - 2pac - "California Love"
- 2017 - Bone Thugs N Harmony - "Tha Crossroads"
- 2016 - 2pac - "Changes"
- 2015 - 2pac - "Changes"
- 2014 - 2pac - "California Love"
- 2013 - 2pac - "Changes"

== Stations ==
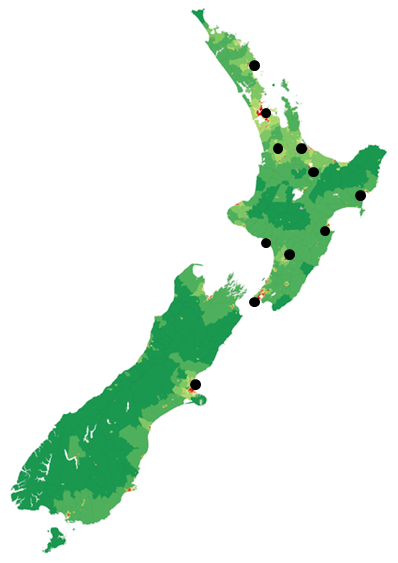
Mai FM stations operating in 2016.

=== Frequencies ===
These are the frequencies for Mai FM:

- Whangārei - 107.3 FM
- Auckland - 88.6 FM
- Waikato - 105.8 FM
- Tauranga - 96.6 FM
- Rotorua - 105.5 FM
- Gisborne - 89.3 FM
- Hawke's Bay - 105.5 FM
- Whanganui - 96.0 FM
- Manawatu - 97.0 FM
- Wellington - 100.5 FM

== Ratings ==
As of May 2025, Mai FM has the seventh-highest share of the New Zealand commercial radio market at 5.8%. It is the highest-rated station that does not serve all thirteen major markets, being absent from Christchurch, Dunedin, Taranaki, Nelson, and Southland.

Mai FM commercial radio ratings (May 2025)
Market	Station share	Change	Rank
All markets	5.8	▲ +0.1	7
Auckland	10.8	▲ +1.3	2
Wellington	6.0	▼ −0.7	5
Waikato	4.2	▼ −1.4	10
Tauranga	4.1	▲ +0.7	11
Manawatū	8.1	▲ +0.7	5
Hawke's Bay	5.5	▼ −3.3	9
Northland	2.2	▼ −0.9	12
Rotorua	6.4	▲ +0.4	7
