= List of radio stations in Waikato =

This is a list of radio stations in the Waikato region of New Zealand.

Most Waikato stations originate from Hamilton, Thames and Taupō.

== Hamilton ==
The following stations broadcast in the Hamilton area.

=== FM stations ===
| Frequency (MHz) | Name | Format | Transmitter | Effective power (kW) | Broadcasting on frequency since | Previous stations on frequency |
|---|---|---|---|---|---|---|
| 89.0 | Free FM | Access radio | Waikato Ruru | 5 | 2012 | Free FM previously known as Community Radio Hamilton re-launched on 89FM – a full power FM frequency after 21 years of broadcasting on 1206 kHz AM and 106.7 MHz FM; 1986–1998 Contact 89FM; 1998–2001 UFM; 2001 – 2007 The Generator; 2007–2010 Backbeat 89FM; 2010–2011 Rush 89FM |
| 89.8 | ZM | Hit Music | Waikato Ruru | 50 | 1997 | 1984–1993: Started as 898 FM transmitting from Mt Te Aroha, changed to 898 Kiwi FM then became just Kiwi FM; 1993–1997 The Breeze on 89.8 |
| 90.6 | Raukawa FM | Urban contemporary Māori language & English | Waikato Ruru | 4 | | |
| 91.4 | RNZ Concert | Classical | Waikato Mt Te Aroha | 80 | 1984 | |
| 91.8 | Maniapoto FM | Local iwi radio, community, bilingual | Maniaiti/Benneydale (Porootarao) | 0.8 | 2021 | 1991–2007: Te Reo Irirangi o Maniapoto; 2007–2021: MFM |
| 92.2 | More FM Waikato | Adult Contemporary | Waikato Ruru | 10 | 1999 | |
| 92.7 | Maniapoto FM | Local iwi radio, community, bilingual | Piopio | 0.8 | 2021 | 1991–2007: Te Reo Irirangi o Maniapoto; 2007–2021: MFM |
| 93.0 | The Rock | Active Rock | Waikato Ruru | 12.5 | 1992 | |
| 93.8 | The Sound (formerly Solid Gold) | Classic rock | Waikato Ruru | 10 | 1997 | 1993 – 1997 Blue Skies 93.8FM |
| 94.6 | Life FM | Contemporary Christian music | Waikato Mt Te Aroha | 80 | 1997 | 1992–1997 94.6 FM Country; June 1997 Fieldays Radio (Temporary during Fieldays) |
| 95.4 | Radio Tainui | Urban contemporary Māori language & English | Waikato Mt Te Aroha | 8 | 1989 | 1989–1993 Te Reo Irirangi O Tainui; 1993–2000 Tainui FM; 2000 – 2011 Radio Tainui; 2011 Tainui FM |
| 96.2 | Radio Hauraki | Classic rock | Waikato Ruru | 12.5 | 1999 | |
| 97.0 | Newstalk ZB | Talk radio | Waikato Ruru | 50 | 1999 | 1992–1993 Easy Listening 97FM; 1993–1999 Easy Listening i97FM |
| 97.8 | The Edge | Pop Music | Waikato Ruru | 12.5 | 1994 | 1991–1994 Buzzard 98FM (same station but rebranded to the very first The Edge station in 1994) |
| 98.1 | Raglan Community Radio | Community Radio | Raglan Te Hutewai Rd | 0.063 | 2006 | from 1994 was on 96.6 MHz |
| 98.6 | The Hits | Adult contemporary music | Waikato Mt Te Aroha | 80 | 1990 | formerly ZHFM, Classic Hits 98.6 ZHFM |
| 99.4 | The Breeze | Easy Listening | Waikato Ruru | 12.5 | 2003 | 1997–2003 Y99.3 (Same station but rebranded as The Breeze and format changed from Adult Contemporary) |
| 99.6 | Maniapoto FM | Local iwi radio, community, bilingual | Te Kūiti (Gadsby Road) | 0.8 | 2021 | 1991–2007: Te Reo Irirangi o Maniapoto; 2007–2021: MFM |
| 100.2 | Breeze Classic | 1970s | Waikato Ruru | 12.5 | 1 November 2025 | 1993–1994: Radio Waikato (not to be confused with Radio Waikato station operating in the 1980s); 1995–1997: Radio Hauraki; 1997 – 2005: Radio Pacific; 2005–2019: Radio Live; Jan 2019 – 20 March 2022: Magic Talk; 21 March 2022 – 30 March 2023: Today FM; 11 April 2023 – 31 October 2025: Magic |
| 101.0 | RNZ National | Public radio | Waikato Mt Te Aroha | 12.5 | | |
| 103.4 | PMN 531 | | Waikato Mt Te Aroha | 80 | Jan 2019 | – Jan 2019 Niu FM |
| 104.2 | George FM | Dance & Electronic | Hamilton Towers | 0.1 | 3 August 2026 | -2023: Magic moved to 100.2 MHz, 8/5/23-2/8/26: Channel X |
| 105.0 | Coast | Classic Hits | Waikato Ruru | 12.5 | 2011 | |
| 105.8 | Mai FM | Urban | Waikato Ruru | 12.5 | 2014 | |
| 106.2 | Maniapoto FM | Local iwi radio, community, bilingual | Te Kawa | 0.8 | 2021 | 1991–2007: Te Reo Irirangi o Maniapoto; 2007–2021: MFM |

=== AM stations ===
| Frequency (kHz) | Name | Format | Transmitter | Broadcasting on frequency since | Previous stations on frequency |
|---|---|---|---|---|---|
| 576 | Sanctuary | Christian radio | Hamilton Greenhill Rd | 14 February 2025 | 1993–1994 Radio Waikato (no connection to Radio Waikato station operating in the 1980s); 1995–1996 Radio Liberty; 1996–1997 Sports Roundup; 1997–2007 Southern Star; 2008 – 2015 The Word; 2015 – 14 February 2025: Star rebranded Sanctuary |
| 792 | iHeartCountry | Country music | Hamilton Eureka | 4 May 2026 | 1997–1998 Sports Roundup; 1998 – 30 March 2020: Radio Sport; 30 March 2020 – 30 June 2020: Newstalk ZB; 1/07/2020-04/05/2026: Gold Sport |
| 855 | Radio Rhema | Christian Radio | Hamilton Greenhill Rd | 1988 | 1985 and 1988 Ag Week Radio (temporary during Fieldays) |
| 954 | Sport Nation | Sports radio | Hamilton Newstead | 2024 | 1978 – 1986 Radio Waikato (originally on 930 kHz from 1971 to 1978); 1986–1988 Country Gold Waikato 954 (same station but change of format); 1988–2005 Radio Pacific; 2005–2007 Radio Pacific and Radio Trackside; 2007–2010 BSport and Radio Trackside; 2010–2015 LiveSport and Radio Trackside; 2015–2020 TAB Trackside; 2021 – 2024: SENZ |
| 1143 | RNZ National | Public radio | Hamilton Eureka | 1978 | Station broadcast on 1140 kHz prior to 1978 |
| 1296 | Newstalk ZB | Talk radio | Hamilton Eureka | 1993 | 1978–1993 1ZH (Station broadcast on 630 kHz from 1931, 770 from 1933 and 1310AM from 1949 to 1978) |
| 1494 | AM Network (Parliament) and Sanctuary | Parliament Public radio and Christian radio | Hamilton Eureka | 2007 | |

=== Low-power FM stations ===
| Frequency (MHz) | Name | Format | Broadcast area | Broadcasting on frequency since | Previous stations on frequency |
|---|---|---|---|---|---|
| 87.8 | Switch FM Radio | Community Radio | | 2010 | |
| 88.0 | Radio Te Aroha | Community Radio | Te Aroha | Feb 2022 | Also online at radiotearoha.com |
| 88.1 | Contact FM | Student Radio | Hamilton | 2005 | |
| 106.7 | More FM | Adult contemporary | Te Aroha | | |
| 106.7 | The HUM | New Zealand and Hamilton-made alternative and indie music | Hamilton | 2014 | Free FM (Hamilton Community Radio) |
| 106.9 | Radio City FM | Hindi Full-service radio | Hamilton | Feb 2012 | |
| 107.1 | The Yak FM | Student Radio | Tauranga | 2004 | formerly Max FM, rebranded in 2011 |
| 107.3 | George FM | Dance radio | Hamilton | | |
| 107.7 | RAG-FM | Rock & Roll | Raglan | 2008 | |

== Coromandel Peninsula ==
The following stations broadcast in the Coromandel Peninsula region.

=== FM stations ===
| Frequency (MHz) | Name | Format | Owner | Location/Transmitter | Effective power (kW) | Broadcasting on frequency since | Previous stations on frequency |
|---|---|---|---|---|---|---|---|
| 89.0 | The Rhythm 89FM | | | Waihi Beach | 0.008 | 1997 | |
| 89.1 | More FM | Adult contemporary music | Mediaworks | Coromandel (Harataunga) | | | |
| 89.9 | More FM | Adult contemporary music | Mediaworks | Whangamatā (Waikaukau Point) | 0.8 | | |
| 90.3 | More FM | Adult contemporary music | Mediaworks | Whitianga (Ohuka Park) | 0.8 | | |
| 90.6 | More FM | Adult contemporary music | Mediaworks | Waihi | 0.1 | | |
| 90.7 | The Breeze | Easy listening | Mediaworks | Pauanui (Pauanui South) | 0.8 | | |
| 90.8 | The Breeze | Easy listening | Mediaworks | Thames (Lower Rataroa) | | | |
| 92.2 | Nga Iwi FM | Urban contemporary Māori language & English | Hauraki Māori Trust Board | Coromandel (Tokatea) | | 1991 | |
| 92.4 | Nga Iwi FM | Urban contemporary Māori language & English | Hauraki Māori Trust Board | Thames (Rataroa) | | | |
| 92.8 | Nga Iwi FM | Urban contemporary Māori language & English | Hauraki Māori Trust Board | Waihi (Hollis Road Waikino) | 0.16 | | |
| 93.1 | The Edge | Contemporary hit radio | Mediaworks | Whangamatā (Tirohanga Drive) | 0.16 | | |
| 93.2 | The Rock | Active rock | Mediaworks | Thames (Lower Rataroa) | 1.58 | March 2025 | More FM |
| 93.8 | Breeze Classic | 1970s | Mediaworks | Waihi | 0.1 | 1 November 2025 | More FM; until 31 October 2025: Magic |
| 93.9 | More FM | Adult contemporary music | Mediaworks | Pauanui (Pauanui South) | 0.8 | | |
| 94.0 | More FM | Adult contemporary music | Mediaworks | Matarangi | 0.16 | | |
| 94.0 | CFM | Contemporary Hit Radio | Radio Coromandel Ltd | Thames/Paeroa (Rataroa) | | Aug 2019 | |
| 95.1 | CFM | Contemporary Hit Radio | Radio Coromandel Ltd | Coromandel (Coromandel Township) | | | |
| 95.1 | CFM | Contemporary Hit Radio | Radio Coromandel Ltd | Whitianga (Ohuka Park) | 1 | Nov 2018 | |
| 95.1 | CFM | Contemporary Hit Radio | Radio Coromandel Ltd | Whangamatā (McBeth Road) | 0.63 | Sep 2019 | |
| 95.1 | CFM | Contemporary Hit Radio | Radio Coromandel Ltd | Pauanui (Pauanui South) | 1 | Dec 2018 | |
| 96.4 | ZM | Contemporary Hit Radio | NZME | Coromandel (Tokatea) | | Dec 2021 | Gold FM |
| 96.4 | ZM | Contemporary Hit Radio | NZME | Waihi | 0.1 | Dec 2021 | Gold FM |
| 96.7 | The Breeze | Easy listening | Mediaworks | Whitianga (Ohuka Park) | 0.16 | | |
| 97.2 | More FM | Adult contemporary music | Mediaworks | Thames (Lower Rataroa) | | | |
| 97.5 | Yesterday FM | | | Whitianga | 0.1 | | |
| 97.9 | Coast | Classic hits | NZME | Whangamatā (McBeth Road) | 0.32 | | 2000: Kool FM |
| 99.1 | ZM | Contemporary Hit Radio | NZME | Whitianga (Miro Place) | 0.1 | Dec 2021 | Gold FM |
| 99.4 | ZM | Contemporary Hit Radio | NZME | Waihi | 0.063 | Dec 2021 | Gold FM |
| 99.5 | The Breeze | Easy listening | Mediaworks | Whangamatā (Waikaukau Point) | 0.8 | | |
| 99.6 | Nga Iwi FM | Urban contemporary Māori language & English | Hauraki Māori Trust Board | Paeroa | 0.1 | | |
| 100.3 | The Hits | Contemporary Hit Radio | NZME | Pauanui (Pauanui South) | 1 | 2017 | 2015–2017: SEA FM Coromandel |
| 100.3 | The Hits | Adult contemporary music | NZME | Whangamatā (Whangamatā South) | 0.16 | | |
| 104.2 | More FM | Adult contemporary music | Mediaworks | Waihi | 0.1 | | |
| 104.4 | Breeze Classic | 1970s | Mediaworks | Thames (Lower Rataroa) | 1.6 | 1 November 2025 | until 31 October 2025: Magic |
| 105.5 | The Rock | Active rock | Mediaworks | Whitianga (Ohuka Park) | 0.16 | | |

=== Low-power FM stations ===
| Frequency (MHz) | Name | Format | Broadcast area | Broadcasting on frequency since | Previous stations on frequency |
|---|---|---|---|---|---|
| 88.0 | ZM | Contemporary Hit Radio | Thames | Dec 2021 | Gold FM |
| 88.0 | Radio Te Aroha | Contemporary | Te Aroha | July 2022 | Positively Te Aroha |
| 88.0 | ZM | Contemporary Hit Radio | Paeroa | Dec 2021 | Gold FM |
| 88.2 | LFM | | Whitianga | | |
| 106.7 | More FM | Adult contemporary | Opito Bay | | |
| 106.9 | The Hits | Contemporary Hit Radio | Whitianga | 2017 | 2015 – 2017: SEA FM Coromandel |
| 107.1 | The Hits | Contemporary Hit Radio | Thames | 2017 | 2015 – 2017: SEA FM Coromandel |
| 107.4 | LFM | | Whitianga | | |

== Taupō and Tūrangi ==
Stations broadcasting in the Taupō and Tūrangi areas.

=== FM stations ===
| Frequency | Name | Format | Location/transmitter | Broadcasting on frequency since | Previous stations on frequency |
|---|---|---|---|---|---|
| 88.8 | The Edge | Pop Music | Taupō (Whakaroa) | 2000 | |
| 89.6 | Lake FM | | Taupō (Aratiatia) | | Cool Blue Taupō |
| 90.4 | ZM | Hit Music | Taupō (Tuhingamata) | 2013 | Radio Sport |
| 91.2 | Sport Nation | Sports radio | Taupō (Whakaroa) | 19 November 2024 | 2014: Mai FM; TAB Trackside; 2021–2024: SENZ |
| 92.0 | Tuwharetoa FM | Urban contemporary Māori language & English | Taupō (Aratiatia) & Tūrangi (Tuwharetoa FM Studio) | | |
| 92.4 | licence previously cancelled | AC | | | The Hits, Lakeland FM, Classic Hits 96.8, Classic Hits Lakeland FM; Radio Lakeland |
| 92.8 | Radio Hauraki | Active rock | Taupō (Tuhingamata) | 2000 | 1997–2000: The Fish |
| 93.6 | More FM | Adult contemporary radio | Taupō (Tuhingamata) | 1990s | KIS FM |
| 94.4 | The Rock | Active Rock | Taupō (Whakaroa) | 1998 | 1995–1997: 94.3 The Fish |
| 95.2 | Radio Rhema | Christian radio | Taupō (Whakaroa) | | |
| 96.0 | Newstalk ZB | Talk radio | Taupō (Tuhingamata) | | Mix 95.9 (original frequency 95.9 MHz) |
| 96.8 | The Hits | Adult contemporary radio | Taupō (Tuhingamata) | 1989 | Classic Hits 96.8, Classic Hits Lakeland FM, Lakeland FM; Radio Lakeland (original frequency 96.7 MHz) |
| 97.6 | Tuwharetoa FM | Urban contemporary Māori language & English | Tūrangi (Pihanga) | | |
| 98.4 | RNZ Concert | Classical music | Taupō (Tuhingamata) | 1990 | |
| 99.2 | Breeze Classic | 1970s | Taupō (Whakaroa) | 1 November 2025 | 2005 – 2019 Radio Live; Jan 2019 – 31 October 2025: Magic |
| 100.0 | The Sound | Classic rock | Taupō (Whakaroa) | | Solid Gold |
| 100.6 | licence previously expired/cancelled | | | | Tuwharetoa FM Tūrangi |
| 100.8 | The Breeze | Easy listening | Taupō (Whakaroa) | | |
| 101.6 | RNZ National | Public radio | Taupō (Whakaroa) | | |
| 103.6 | The Heat | Adult Urban | Taupō Reporoa (Paeroa Range) | Sept 2022 | |
| 104.0 | PMN 531 | | Taupō (Whakaroa) | Jan 2019 | – Jan 2019 Niu FM |
| 104.8 | RNZ National | Public radio | Taupō (Mountain Road) | | |
| 105.6 | Life FM | Contemporary Christian music | Taupō (Whakaroa) | | |
| 106.4 | Brian FM | Anything | Taupō (Aratiatia) | | Timeless Taupo |
| Streaming | TC Radio | Tauhara College | | Sept 2020 | internet only station |

=== Low-power FM stations ===
| Frequency (MHz) | Name | Format | Broadcast area | Broadcasting on frequency since | | | | | | | | | |
|---|---|---|---|---|---|---|---|---|---|---|---|---|---|
| 87.6 | Bitter FM | | Taupō | | | | | | | | | | |
| 87.8 | Ski FM | Contemporary hit radio | Tūrangi | previously 87.6 MHz | | | | | | | | | |
| 87.8 | Ski FM | Contemporary hit radio | Taupō | 2011 | | | | | | | | | |
| 88.3 | Sanctuary | Christian radio | Taupō Central | Until 14 February 2025: Star rebranded Sanctuary | | | | | | | | | |
| 106.7 | Timeless Taupo | 50s, 60s, 70s | Taupō | 2025 | | | | | | | | | |
| 106.9 | Sanctuary | Christian radio | Taupō North | Until 14 February 2025: Star rebranded Sanctuary | | | | | | | | | |
| 107.2 | More FM | Adult contemporary | Kinloch | | −107.5 | Kis FM | Local Community | Taupō | 107.7 | iHeartCountry | Country music | Taupō | previously Radio Sport; 30 Mar – 30 June 2020 Newstalk ZB; 01/07/2020-04/05/2026: Gold Sport |
