= Radio Happy Isles =

Coordinates: 9°25′55″S 159°57′20″E

Radio Happy Isles is a national radio station in the Solomon Islands, operated by the Solomon Islands Broadcasting Corporation. It broadcasts from Honiara.

Its stated purpose is not only to broadcast news but also to "promote a sense of national unity and Reconciliation", in the aftermath of violent civil conflict, "uphold the cultural values of Solomon Islands and create programs that meet the educational and informational needs of the listener".

In 2001, its weekday programme began at 6 AM with a broadcasting of the national anthem, followed by a ten-minute "morning devotion". Daily programmes included music, sports, and weather reports, as well as national and international news. International news was provided mainly through the rebroadcasting of programmes from the British Broadcasting Corporation, Radio New Zealand International and the Australian Broadcasting Corporation's Radio Australia. Some programmes were broadcasting in English, and others in Pijin. Specific programmes were broadcast on Saturdays and Sundays, including programmes with a religious focus on Sundays.

The name "Happy Isles" for Solomon Islands is based on a line in Tennyson's poem "Ulysses": "It may be we shall touch the Happy Isles". It was used as the title of a book about Solomon Islands by D.C. Horton (1966). The station's name was suggested by VSA volunteer training officer Hugh Young on his departure in 1976, but not adopted until a year or two later, by Station Manager Welshman Teilo. As a result, the "Happy Isles" was then widely adopted as a nickname for the whole country. It was used as the title of a 1999 book by Robert Seward, Radio Happy Isles: Media and Politics at Play in the Pacific.
