= RNZ National =

New Zealand radio station

RNZ National Te Reo Irirangi o Aotearoa Ā-Motu
- New Zealand
- Broadcast area: New Zealand
- Frequencies: AM: various; FM: 101.0–7, 104.4–8; Community: various; Freeview: Channel 50; Sky Digital: Channel 421; Vodafone: Channel 501

Programming
- Format: News, speech

Ownership
- Owner: Radio New Zealand
- Sister stations: RNZ Concert; RNZ Pacific

History
- First air date: 1925; 101 years ago
- Former names: Radio New Zealand National (2007–2015); National Radio (1925–2007)

Links
- Webcast: Live stream
- Website: Official website

RNZ National (Māori: Te Reo Irirangi o Aotearoa Ā-Motu), formerly Radio New Zealand National, and known until 2007 as the National Programme or National Radio, is a publicly funded non-commercial New Zealand English-language radio network operated by Radio New Zealand. It specialises in programmes dedicated to news, the arts, music, and New Zealand culture generally, and includes some material in the Māori language. Historically the programme was broadcast on the (AM) "YA" stations 1YA, 2YA, 3YA and 4YA in the main centres. Its sister stations are RNZ Concert and RNZ Pacific.

== Content and services ==
RNZ National, formerly National Radio, is RNZ's independent news and current affairs platform, and offers both its own on-air and online services and those from third party services. It includes the news and current affairs programmes Morning Report (which began on 1 April 1975), Midday Report, and Checkpoint, as well as having news bulletins every hour. Its news service has specialist correspondents, overseas correspondents, reporters, and a network of regional reporters. Magazine programmes include a broad range of contributors, interviews, music pieces, and dramas, with reports and regular features in English and Māori. The network provides coverage of business, science, politics, philosophy, religion, rural affairs, sports, and other topics.

In November 2026, RNZ National confirmed that it would be launching a new Auckland-based current affairs show called Saturday Morning in 2027. Veteran broadcaster Patrick Gower will be its host.

== Broadcasting ==
RNZ National's programming is broadcast via several means including AM and FM broadcasting and the Koreasat 6 satellite. It was the first network in New Zealand to incorporate the Radio Data System in its FM signal. Most FM frequencies are 101FM state-owned public service licences and some are held by non-profit community organisations. RNZ National broadcasts its FM signal in mono, but the on-line and terrestrial Freeview HD services are available in stereo. It is also available on Sky Digital TV channel 421, Freeview satellite channel 50, and via stereo on the terrestrial Freeview HD service.

=== RNZ-owned frequencies ===
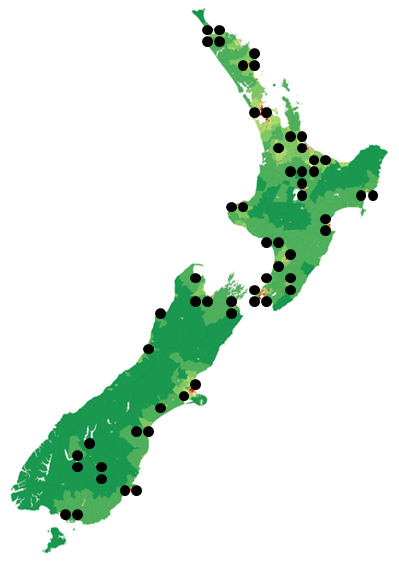
RNZ-owned frequencies on which RNZ National is broadcast

These are the RNZ-owned frequencies of RNZ National:

- Kaitaia – Maungataniwha – 101.1 FM
- Kaikohe – Hikurangi – 101.5 FM
- Kaikohe – Ohaeawai – 981 AM
- Whangārei – Otaika – 837 AM
- Whangārei – Horokaka – 101.2 FM
- Whangārei – Parahaki – 104.4 FM
- Auckland – Henderson – 756 AM
- Auckland – Sky Tower – 101.4 FM
- Hamilton – Eureka – 1143 AM
- Hamilton – Te Aroha – 101.0 FM
- Tauranga – Paengaroa – 819 AM
- Tauranga – Kopukairua – 101.4 FM
- Tokoroa – Wiltsdown – 729 AM
- Tokoroa – Te Aroha – 101.0 FM
- Rotorua – Tihiotonga – 101.5 FM
- Whakatāne – Mount Edgecumbe – 101.7 FM
- Taupō – Whakaroa – 101.6 FM
- Taupō – Mountain Road – 104.8 FM
- Gisborne – Wheatstone Road – 101.3 FM
- Gisborne – Wainui – 1314 AM
- Hawke's Bay – Opapa – 630 AM
- Hawke's Bay – Kohinurākau (Mount Erin) – 101.5 FM
- New Plymouth – Mount Egmont – 101.2 FM
- Palmerston North – Wharite – 101.0 FM
- Whanganui – Mount Jowett – 101.6 FM
- Masterton – Otahoua – 101.5 FM
- Kāpiti – Forest Heights – 101.5 FM
- Wellington – Titahi Bay – 567 AM
- Wellington – Kaukau – 101.3 FM
- Wellington – Towai – 101.7 FM
- Blenheim – Wither Hills – 101.7 FM
- Nelson – Grampians – 101.6 FM
- Westport – Cape Foulwind – 1458 AM
- Greymouth – Paparoa – 101.1 FM
- Christchurch – Gebbies Pass – 675 AM
- Christchurch – Sugarloaf – 101.7 FM
- Ashburton – Gawler Downs – 101.3 FM
- Timaru – Fairview – 918 AM
- Timaru – Mount Studholme – 101.1 FM
- Wānaka – Mount Maude – 101.0 FM
- Queenstown – Peninsula Hill – 101.6 FM
- Alexandra – Obelisk – 101.5 FM
- Dunedin – Highcliff – 810 AM
- Dunedin – Highcliff – 101.4 FM
- Invercargill – Dacre – 720 AM
- Invercargill – Hedgehope – 101.2 FM

=== Other broadcasting methods ===
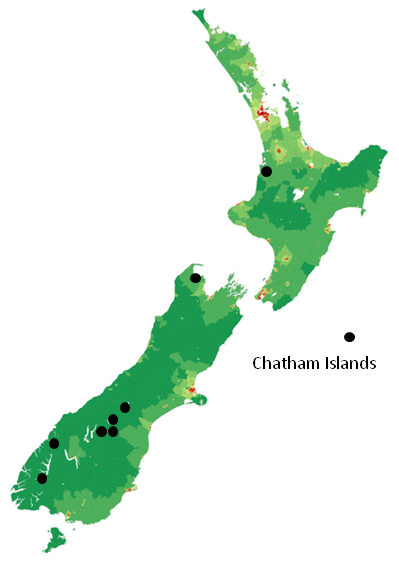
Community-owned stations on which RNZ National is broadcast

These are the community-owned stations and other broadcasting methods of RNZ National:

- Te Kūiti – 94.0 FM
- Tākaka – Mount Burnett – 98.2 FM
- Reefton – 88.0 FM (low power)
- Lake Tekapo – Mount John – 93.4 FM
- Twizel – Mount Mary – 92.6 FM (closed 1 May 2024)
- Omarama – Cloud Hill – 97.3 FM
- Otematata – 106.7 FM (low power)
- Milford Sound – Milford Sound Hotel – 92.0 FM
- Te Anau – Ramparts Road – 101.6 FM
- In-stereo Internet Audio Streaming
- Podcasts
- iHeartRadio
- Unencrypted satellite broadcast
- Sky Television DHS encrypted satellite broadcast
- TelstraClear cable TV in Wellington
- TelstraClear cable TV in Christchurch
- Freeview television channel 50

== Reception ==
In 2013, RNZ National had a 10.3 per cent market share, the highest nationwide and up from 9.1 per cent in 2009. Market share peaked at 11.1 per cent in 2011, probably due to the station's coverage of the Christchurch earthquake. In 2014 493,000 people listened to RNZ National over the course of a week – the second-largest cumulative audience. A 2021 survey estimated 609,800 listeners (13.5% of the 10+ population), Morning Report being the most popular, with 434,000 listeners.

In August 2024, The New Zealand Herald reported that RNZ National's overall cumulative audience had fallen from over 700,000 in early 2020 to 529,800 in 2024. During that period, RNZ National's flagship Morning Report show had declined from a cumulative audience of 500,000 in early 2020 to 376,500 in 2024. Meanwhile, commercial competitor Newstalk ZB's breakfast show hosted by Mike Hosking had risen from under 400,000 to 445,300. In response, RNZ chief executive Paul Thompson said that RNZ had distributed its output across other platforms, including its website, app, and podcasts, and also had content deals with over 65 partners. Thompson also said that RNZ had expanded its reach from 15% to 70% of the population over the past 15 years. He estimated that live radio now comprised 14% of its reach.

== Issues and controversies ==
=== Broadcasting standards breaches ===
In September 2004, the Broadcasting Standards Authority (BSA) upheld a complaint by Peter Ellis against RNZ National's Nine to Noon programme, ruling that an August 2003 broadcast had breached fairness and balance standards. The programme aired a pre-recorded interview with a young man and his mother, who alleged that Ellis had sexually abused the man as a child at the Christchurch Civic Crèche in 1985. While Ellis was identified by name, the interviewees remained anonymous, and the allegations were not specific. The Authority found that RNZ had failed to provide Ellis with a reasonable opportunity to respond, and that the interview was conducted in a manner that lacked appropriate scrutiny. It ordered RNZ to broadcast and publish statements summarising the decision, issue an apology, and pay $5,300 to Ellis and $5,000 to the Crown. An appeal by RNZ to the High Court was dismissed in September 2005.

In October 2006, the BSA upheld a complaint by Cabinet Minister David Benson-Pope against RNZ National's Nine to Noon programme, ruling that a May 2005 broadcast had breached fairness standards. The programme aired an interview with an anonymous former student who alleged that Benson-Pope, while a teacher at Bayfield High School in the 1980s, had bullied him and administered corporal punishment excessively. The interview followed questions raised in Parliament the day before by opposition MPs, under privilege, about Benson-Pope’s conduct as a teacher. The Authority found that RNZ had not adequately verified the credibility of the interviewee before granting anonymity and had failed to sufficiently challenge the allegations during the broadcast. Complaints about balance and accuracy were not upheld. RNZ was ordered to broadcast a summary of the decision and pay $5,000 to the complainant and $2,000 to the Crown.

In October 2017, the BSA upheld a complaint from Trident Systems Ltd about an Insight documentary broadcast by RNZ on 12 and 13 March 2017, which explored illegal fish dumping and camera monitoring in the commercial fishing industry. The segment included comments from Greenpeace NZ’s Dr Russel Norman, who alleged that Trident’s monitoring had failed to detect illegal behaviour that another company identified, and implied this influenced a government contract decision. The BSA found that RNZ failed to give Trident a reasonable opportunity to respond, breaching the fairness standard. However, the complaint was not upheld under the accuracy or balance standards. RNZ was ordered to broadcast a statement both on-air and online, and to pay $2,000 in legal costs to the complainant.

In September 2020, the BSA upheld a complaint from activist Lisa Prager about a Checkpoint report on 25 February 2020 summarising her submission at a Waitematā Local Board meeting. The report inaccurately stated that she "regretted" claiming mana whenua status during a campaign to protect trees on Ōwairaka/Mount Albert. The BSA found this misrepresented her actual statement and, combined with a board member's suggestion that her comments were "a bit racist", created an unfair and damaging portrayal. The complaint was upheld under the accuracy and fairness standards, and RNZ was ordered to pay $1,818 in legal costs to the complainant.

In May 2023, the BSA upheld a complaint about news bulletins broadcast on 19 and 20 April 2022, which reported on the Government’s apparent delay in ending the COVID-19 managed isolation and quarantine (MIQ) system. The BSA found the items breached the accuracy standard by creating the misleading impression that public health advice from November 2021 had called for MIQ to end immediately, when in fact it recommended a carefully managed transition. The BSA found that while the balance standard was not breached—due to further reporting on 20 April which conveyed the Government’s perspective—RNZ was required to issue a broadcast statement.

=== 2025 Sutherland report ===
In mid-August 2025, former RNZ news chief Richard Sutherland released his review into RNZ National's performance and audience engagement. Sutherland interviewed 50 RNZ staff during his review, which concluded that the news broadcaster suffered from a lack of audience clarity, internal cohesion, urgency, blame shifting, low ambition and a perception that radio broadcasting was in decline. RNZ's total radio audience had dropped from a peak of 703,048 per week in the second half of 2020 to 467,700 per week in May 2025. RNZ National, which had once dominated the radio market based on cumulative audience, had fallen eighth place behind commercial news broadcaster Newstalk ZB, music stations The Breeze, More FM, ZM, The Edge, The Rock and Mai FM. Sutherland's review proposed several corrective measures to reverse RNZ National's audience decline including replacing presenters and on-air voices who did not align with its target audience, relocating its flagship current affairs program Morning Report from Wellington to Auckland, focusing on its 50–69 age target audience, and creating a new chief audio officer position. In response, RNZ's chief executive Paul Thompson confirmed plans to relocate Morning Report to TVNZ's central Auckland studios, creating a new chief audio officer to boost its audience and focusing on the 50–69 age bracket. Thompson said that the station aimed to grow its audience to 500,000 by November 2026 and 520,000 by November 2027.
