= Samuel Mann =

New Zealand computer scientist

- Education: University of Otago
- Known for: Sustainable practitioner Green IT; Environmental Informatics
- Scientific career
- Fields: computer science education, and sustainability
- Thesis: Spatial Process Modelling for Regional Environmental Decision-making (1998)

Samuel Mann is a New Zealand computer scientist, with interests in computer science education and sustainability. He is a full Professor at Otago Polytechnic. He has published widely on sustainable practice, both in computing and more generally to apply to any discipline. Mann was educated at the University of Otago where he studied botany and geography, before completing a PhD in Information Science.

== Sustainable Practitioner ==
Mann developed the term "sustainable practitioner". In 2007 under Mann's guidance, Otago Polytechnic committed to the strategy that "every graduate may think and act as a sustainable practitioner". Initiatives have included a Living Campus, and Sustainable Community Enterprise.

Mann is building an oral archive of conversations with sustainable practitioners. This is also broadcast on Otago Access Radio and podcast as Sustainable Lens. The goal is to create a searchable archive of conversations with people from many different fields who are applying their skills to a sustainable future.

== CITRENZ ==
Since 2011 Mann has served as Chair of Computing and Information Technology Information and Education and Research NZ (CITRENZ). In that role he oversaw the development of a new suite of computing programmes for all New Zealand polytechnics.

== Awards ==
In 2009 Mann was awarded the Beeby Fellowship. The Beeby Fellowship is a joint initiative between the New Zealand Council for Educational Research and the New Zealand National Commission for UNESCO.

== Books authored ==
- The Green Graduate: Educating Every Student as a Sustainable Practitioner (2011) sets out a framework for integrating sustainability into every course of study.
- Sustainable Lens: a visual guide (2011) traces the development of sustainability through its representation in diagrams. It presents a model for seeing the world through a sustainability-driven perspective.
