= Radio Happy Lagoon =

Radio Happy Lagoon (or Radio Hapi Lagun in Pijin) is a provincial radio station broadcast by the Solomon Islands Broadcasting Corporation in the Western Province. It operates from the provincial capital, Gizo, on 945 kHz in the Medium Wave Band.
