= Wantok FM =

Radio station in the Solomon Islands

Wantok FM is a national radio station in the Solomon Islands, operated by the Solomon Islands Broadcasting Corporation. It broadcasts from Honiara.

The station has a partnership with the Australian Broadcasting Corporation, broadcasting the latter's programmes as well as its own.

Wantok is a Pijin word which comes from the English "one talk", and means people who speak the same language, belong to the same culture, are friends and help one another out.
