= RNZ Pacific =

International division of Radio New Zealand

RNZ Pacific Ko Te Reo Irirangi o Aotearoa, Te Moana-nui-a-Kiwa
- New Zealand
- Broadcast area: International (from New Zealand)

Programming
- Languages: Cook Islands Māori; English; French; Niuean; Pijin; Samoan; Tongan
- Format: News/Talk/Music

Ownership
- Owner: Radio New Zealand
- Sister stations: RNZ National; RNZ Concert

History
- First air date: 1948 (as Radio New Zealand)

Links
- Webcast: RNZ Pacific
- Website: RNZ Pacific

RNZ Pacific or Radio New Zealand Pacific, sometimes abbreviated to RNZP, is a division of Radio New Zealand and the official international broadcasting station of New Zealand. It broadcasts a variety of news, current affairs and sports programmes in English, and news in seven Pacific languages. The station's mission statement requires it to promote and reflect New Zealand in the Pacific, and better relations between New Zealand and Pacific countries. It was called Radio New Zealand International or RNZ International (RNZI) until May 2017, though as of 2026 it uses both names for identification.

As the only shortwave radio station in New Zealand, RNZ Pacific broadcasts to several island nations. It has studios in Radio New Zealand House, Wellington and a transmitter at Rangitaiki in the middle of the North Island. Its broadcasts cover from East Timor in the west across to French Polynesia in the east, covering all South Pacific countries in between. The station targets Micronesia, Papua New Guinea, Fiji, Samoa, the Cook Islands, Solomon Islands, Vanuatu and Tonga during a 24-hour rotation. The signal can also be heard in Australia, East and Southeast Asia, Europe and North America.

== History ==
=== Early years ===
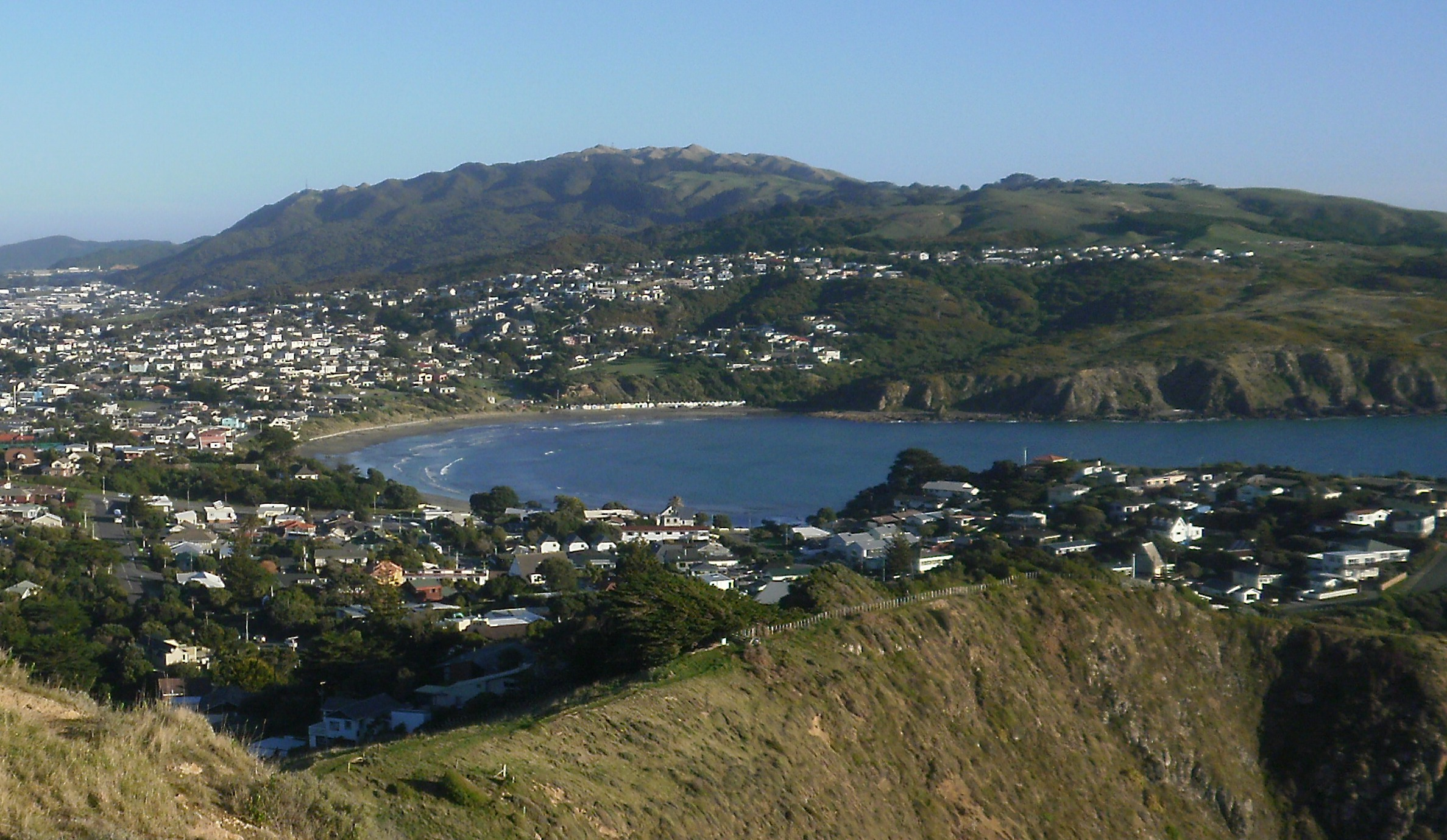
RNZI originally broadcast from Titahi Bay.

RNZ International was launched in 1948 as Radio New Zealand, a subsidiary of what was then the New Zealand Broadcasting Corporation. It utilised two 7.5 kW transmitters at Titahi Bay which had been left behind by the US military during World War II. It briefly closed before reopening in 1976, under the foreign policy of the third Labour government.

From 1987, the Government faced growing pressure to have a more active foreign policy towards the Pacific region. It upgraded the station, installed a new 100 kW transmitter and re-launched it as Radio New Zealand International (RNZI) on the first day of the Auckland 1990 Commonwealth Games. The station adopted new digital technology and launched a website in 2000.

In 1992, Johnson Honimae was fired as the Solomon Islands Broadcasting Corporation (SIBC) head of current affairs over his work as a freelance reporter in Bougainville for RNZI and other international media outlets. SIBC general manager Patterson Mae was accused of undermining the principles of press freedom, and resigned as president of the regional journalism body the Pacific Islands News Association.

=== Recent years ===
In 1998 and again in 2000 RNZI won a Commonwealth Broadcasting Association's Rolls-Royce Award for Excellence. At a function of the Association for International Broadcasting in London, November 2007, RNZI received the International Radio Station of the Year award ahead of the BBC World Service. The association praised the station for what it said was an ability and clarity of vision - and for the delivery of something it said was valued by audiences throughout the region. RNZI also won the award for Most Innovative Partnership.

As of 2015, RNZI has 13 staff. These include manager Linden Clark, technical manager Adrian Sainsbury, news editor Walter Zweifel and deputy news editor Don Wiseman. Myra Oh, Colette Jansen, Damon Taylor, Dominic Godfrey and Jeremy Veal serve as technical producers and continuity announcers.

In May 2017 Radio New Zealand International's (RNZI) online brand was changed to RNZ Pacific to more clearly reflect what the service does and emphasise its role in engaging with the domestic Pasifika audience in New Zealand. According to RNZ, "For now, the RNZI brand will continue to be maintained on-air through our international service, but domestically it is now known as RNZ Pacific. However, as of 2020 the name "RNZ Pacific" is used on the air in all but the frequency change announcements, and the website RNZI is being phased out.

RNZ Pacific uses analog transmissions to reach shortwave radio listeners throughout the Pacific Basin, and since 2016 it has used DRM digital radio transmissions to distribute programming to partner stations in the region for rebroadcasting. As of October 2022, FM and AM stations in American Samoa, Cook Islands, Kiribati, Niue, Norfolk Island, Samoa, Solomon Islands, Tonga, and Vanuatu rebroadcast RNZ Pacific programming.

== News ==
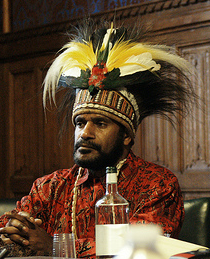
Radio New Zealand International has interviewed West Papuan activist Benny Wenda on several occasions.

Aside from Radio Australia, RNZI is the only international state-owned public broadcaster covering the Pacific region. Its news service focuses on South Pacific countries, and includes news bulletins in eight languages. The station's reporters include Johnny Blades, Sally Round, former Pacific Media Centre editor Alex Perrottet, Moera Tuilaepa-Taylor, Indira Moala, Koroi Hawkins, Koro Vaka'uta, Leilani Momoisea, Amelia Langford, Bridget Tunnicliffe, Mary Baines, Jenny Meyer and The Wireless contributor Jamie Tahana. Vinnie Wylie heads the station's sports coverage, and freelancers are often used for on-the-ground reporting.

The station's news service focuses on news that relates to New Zealand, and ongoing stories like natural disasters and political crises. It predominantly cites Government and opposition leaders and the spokespeople of non-government organisations and government departments. Marshall Islands journalist Giff Johnson is an RNZI correspondent, and World Bank regional director Franz Dreez-Gross and Victoria University academic John Fraenkel are regularly interviewed for stories.

=== Coverage ===
RNZP regularly covers the Papua conflict and interviews exiled Koteka tribal leader Benny Wenda on his visits to New Zealand. It has reported on Vanuatu's Parliamentary debate on the conflict, Indonesian estimates of the death toll and West Papua National Liberation Army claims of militant arrests. The station has also interviewed members of the Melanesian Spearhead Group over the army's bid to join the group. However, the station does not have any reporters on the ground.

The station provides ongoing coverage of several regional issues, including climate change, rapid emigration, LGBT rights in Oceania, the development of Pacific tax havens and the growing influence of China. It allowed other media to redistribute its ongoing coverage of Fijian politics after the 2000 Fijian coup d'état, and has covered the transition to independence in East Timor and political stability in the Solomon Islands.

RNZP also gives greater air time to national news stories from South Pacific countries than New Zealand's other mainstream and Pacific media outlets. For instance, during March 2013 it covered the constitutional crisis in Nauru, video of alleged torture of prisoners by Fijian government officials and a World Bank grant to the Samoan government.

== Programmes ==
=== Original programming ===
RNZP produces most of its own programming, including regional current affairs, Pacific business and news bulletins in various languages. Some local Pacific Island radio stations rebroadcast selected items such as news and weather, and Radio New Zealand National, ABC Radio Australia, BBC World Service and the World Radio Network rebroadcast its reports and current affairs programmes.

Daily programmes include Pacific waves (daily Pacific current affairs), Pacific Weather Forecasts (daily forecasts), News about New Zealand (weekly New Zealand current affairs), News in Pacific Languages, World and Pacific News (daily Pacific news and sports bulletins), New Zealand Newspaper Headlines (daily headlines), Pacific Business Report (daily business news), Pacific Regional News (daily Pacific current affairs), Pacific Music (daily music selection), The Wantok Program, 30 minutes of news and current affairs from ABC Radio Australia from Monday to Friday.

Weekly programmes include Pacific Correspondent (local political and social reports), Tagata o te Moana (weekly Pacific current affairs and music), The Feature Interview, Sports Talk (weekly Pacific sports discussion), Champions of the pacific (weekly Pacific sports news) and Tradewinds (weekly Pacific business).

=== Other RNZ programming ===
Some of RNZ Pacific's programmes are simulcasts or repeats of RNZ National content, such as the flagship current affairs programmes Morning Report, Midday Report, Checkpoint, and Late Edition. The station also broadcasts some sports commentaries of major sporting events, and includes a weekly programme of hymns from RNZ Concert.

Every day, RNZ Pacific also broadcasts Te Manu Korihi (morning Māori news), New Zealand Coastal Weather (morning forecasts), Morning Report (morning current affairs), Midday Report (afternoon news), Nine to Noon (current affairs), Checkpoint (afternoon current affairs), Late Edition (evening current affairs) and Radio New Zealand National simulcasts.

Weekly programmes broadcast by RNZ Pacific include Insight (Monday), Spectrum (Monday), Focus on Politics (Monday), Asian Report (Wednesday), Music 101 (Saturday), Saturday Night (Saturday), Hymns on Sunday Morning (Sunday) and Sounds Historical (Sunday).

=== Programmes from other sources ===
RNZ Pacific also broadcasts content from other programme producers and international broadcasters. These include Parliament Today concluded in December 2016, the French language Pacific Press Review and programmes from the BBC World Service. BBC current affairs show The World Today is broadcast every day.

== Transmission ==
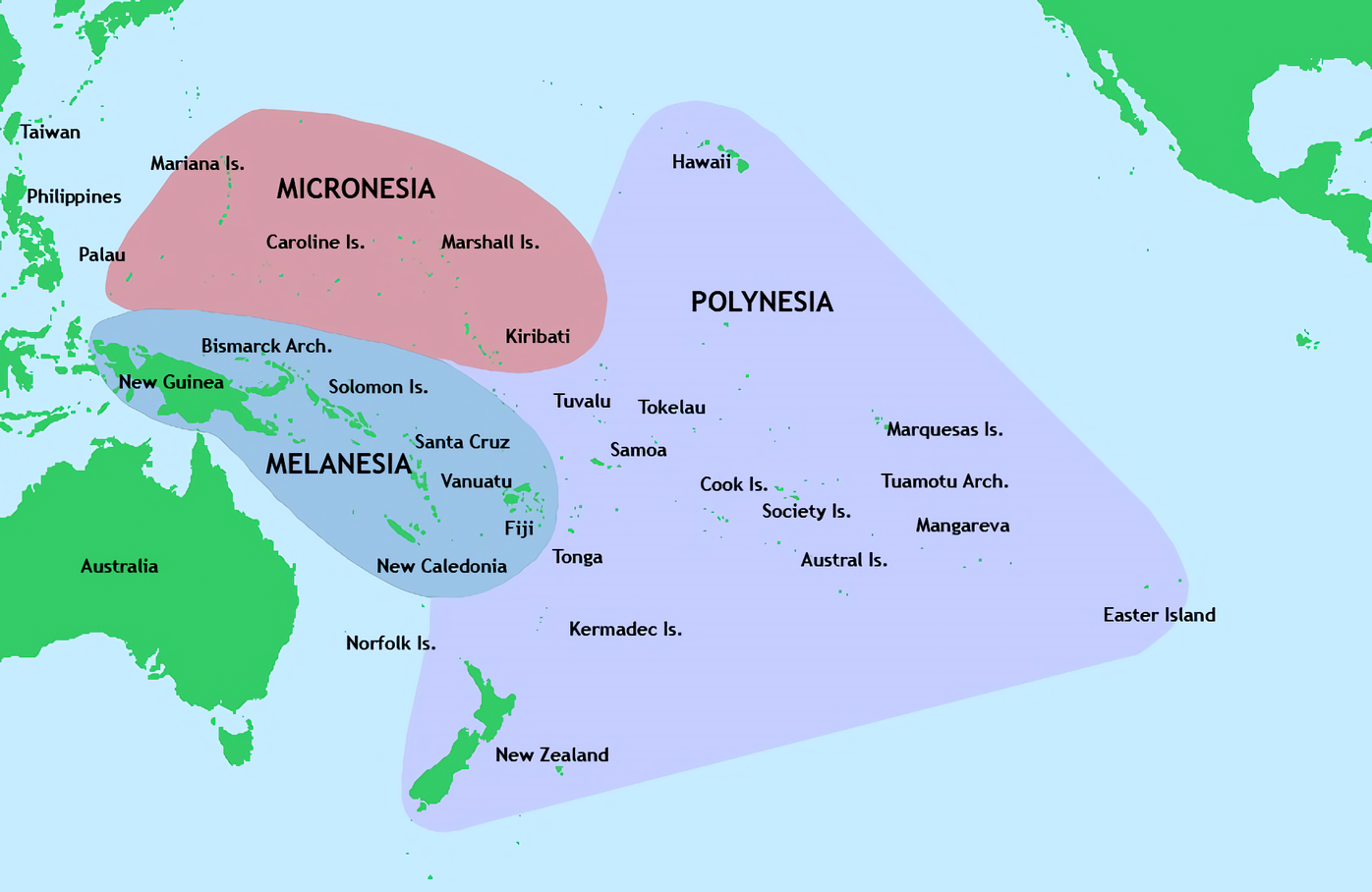
RNZ Pacific is available across Micronesia, Melanesia and Polynesia.

RNZ Pacific broadcasts on different frequencies and times to different parts of the Pacific region, during a 24-hour rotation. The current frequency schedule is available on the broadcaster's website. Frequency changes are made to reflect radio shortwave propagation variations to the station's target areas. Maintenance of the transmitter is carried out on the first and third Wednesday of every month from 10:30 a.m. to 6 p.m. NZT, sometimes interrupting the station's broadcasts.

The RNZ Pacific transmission site is located in Rangitaiki on North Island. The unattended site is fed by a digital link from studios in Wellington, 300km away. In 2005, a 100 kW transmitter capable of both analog and digital broadcasting using the Digital Radio Mondiale digital radio standard was installed at the site. Two high frequency and two low band antennas are used to send RNZ Pacific programming across the Pacific Basin but the signal can sometimes also be heard in North America, Japan, China, Europe, Russia and the Middle East.

A new 100 kW transmitter, also DRM-capable, is planned to begin operation in early 2024.

The new RNZ's Pacific Shortwave Transmitter launched on 1 August 2024. The service provides news and critical safety information across the Pacific service reaching 19 countries and nearly 2 million listeners.

RNZ Pacific is also available free-to-air on satellite Intelsat 19 in C band (4146.5 MHz) covering the Pacific and Southeast & East Asia.
