= Community Access Media Alliance =

New Zealand radio station association

Community Access Media Alliance (CAMA)
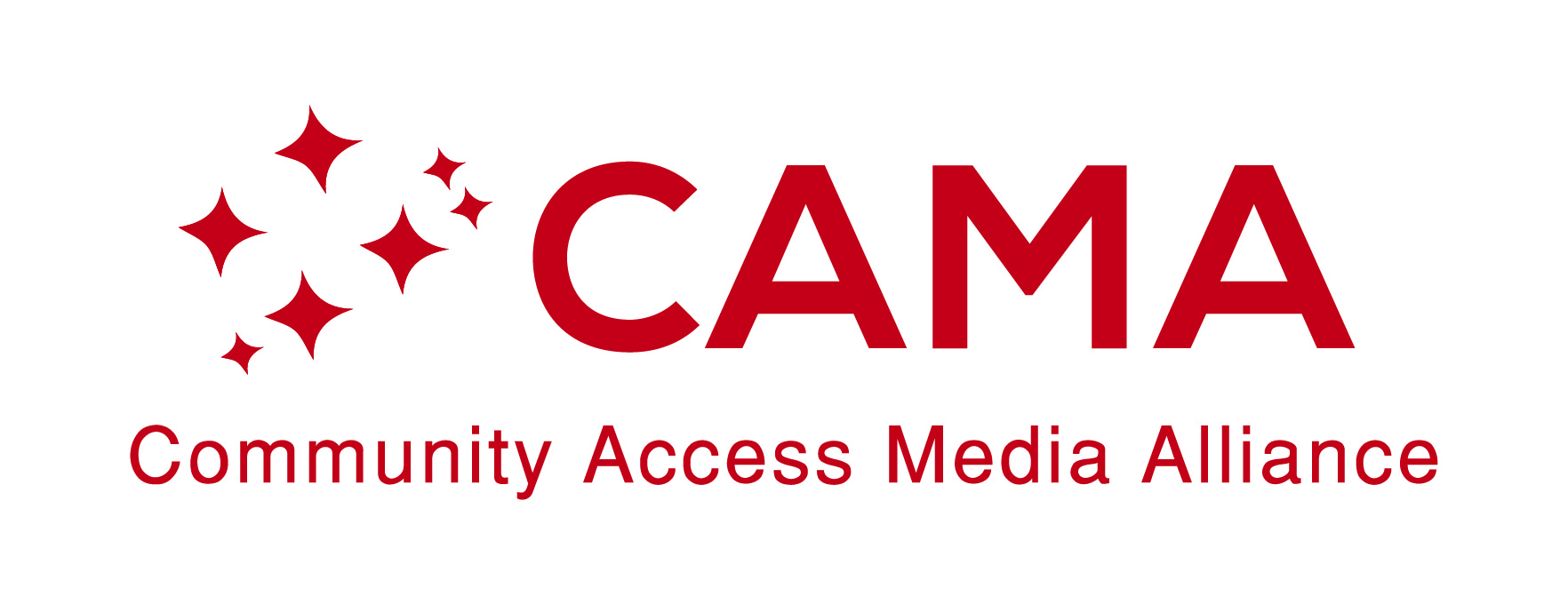
- New Zealand
- Broadcast area: New Zealand
- Frequency: Various

Programming
- Format: Community radio

Ownership
- Owner: 12 community trusts

History
- First air date: 1981-2010

Links
- Webcast: accessradio.org Streams: Various
- Website: cama.nz

The Community Access Media Alliance (CAMA) (formerly the Association of Community Access Broadcasters (ACAB)), also known as the Access Radio Network, is a group of twelve New Zealand community radio media organisations. The stations were established between 1981 and 2010 and have received government funding since 1989 to broadcast community programming and provide facilities, training and on-air time for individuals and community groups to produce programming.

In addition to government funding conditions, the stations also have an individual and collective mandate to broadcast programmes for people of a wide range of particular religions, cultures, languages, ages and sexualities. Stations operate independently and locally, with each station expected to make decisions on programming and scheduling by internal consensus. In total, they produce content in at least 40 different languages.

The member stations currently serve Auckland, Waikato, Taranaki, Hawke's Bay, Manawatū, Wairarapa, Kāpiti, Wellington, Nelson, Canterbury, Otago and Southland. Some community stations have powerful frequencies, while others are low-power stations with a small local reach.

== History ==
=== Establishment ===
The stations of the Access Radio Network were established between 1981 and 2010:

- April 1981: Wellington Access Radio
- March 1986: Arrow FM Wairarapa
- 1987: Planet FM Auckland
- 28 February 1988: Plains FM Canterbury
- 1990: Otago Access Radio
- 1992: Free FM Hamilton
- 1992: Radio Southland
- 1994: Fresh FM Nelson
- 1995: Radio Hawke's Bay (renamed from Radio Kidnappers August 2022)
- 1996: Coast Access Radio (Kapiti)
- 1998: Manawatū People's Radio (formerly Manawatū Sounz, Access Triple Nine and Access Manawatū)
- 2010: Access Radio Taranaki

The association was set up in the early 1990s following a meeting between community station managers and New Zealand on Air officials in Wellington. It was the first opportunity many station managers had to meet each other and share the challenges each station had faced, including operating on limited resources, relying on volunteer support, serving diverse communities or operating from remote locations.

=== Funding ===
In 1989, the Broadcasting Act set up the Broadcasting Commission - known publicly as New Zealand On Air - to fund New Zealand content for both mainstream and minority audiences. Funding of access radio has always been a part of that function, and the ongoing funding of the Association member stations remains a core component of the commission's Community Broadcasting Strategy. A government funding pool of approximately $2 million is now allocated annually for the eleven stations to produce programming for women, youth, children, ethnic and other minorities and people with disabilities in accordance with section 36(c) of the Broadcasting Act.

Individual station funding is allocated on a four-tier system based on audience reach, with each station receiving between $110,000 and $220,000 in annual, contestable and publicly transparent funding rounds. Auckland's Planet FM is in the highest-funded Tier One; and Free FM Hamilton, Wellington Access Radio and Plans FM Canterbury are Tier Two. Radio Kidnappers in Hawke's Bay, Access Manawatu, Fresh FM in Nelson, Otago Access Radio and Radio Southland are Tier 3; and Arrow FM in Wairarapa and Coast Access FM in Kapiti are on the lowest-funded Tier 4.

=== National operations ===
The association has established itself as the national lobbying and resourcing organisation of community radio stations and aims to promote, develop, foster and support the community access model. It is affiliated with and emulates the Community Broadcasting Association of Australia and the World Association of Community Radio Broadcasters but has no domestic affiliations. Instead, it has become a self-support network, allowing the stations to share resources and ideas.

Each year, the association holds an annual general meeting at a member station and appoints a chair, secretary and treasury with each station allocated a single vote every year. The association has remained non-profit and consensus-driven, with discussions taking place in face-to-face meetings, teleconferences and via email. However, while the association can introduce policies, it cannot dictate the content of individual community radio stations.

=== Awards ===
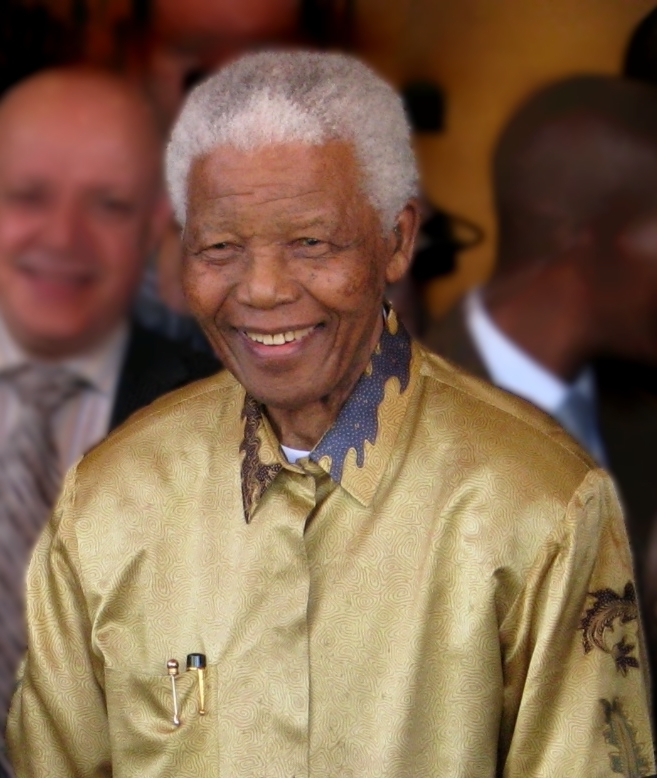
Access stations received awards for their tributes to Nelson Mandela.

Community stations have picked up several awards at the annual New Zealand Radio Awards since community radio stations were allowed into the event in 1993. The first awards went to Wellington Access for Terry Shaw's Songwriting Show and John E. Joyce's Basically Speaking and This is Jazz USA. Later winners have included Viva Latinoamerica (Fresh FM), Jazz Bros (Coast Access), Like Minds Like Mine (Arrow FM), Six Degrees Music Show (Fresh FM) and Candela (Community Radio Hamilton).

Fresh FM music programme The World of Leopold Bloom - the work of Leopold Bloom and Matt Budd - has received more radio awards and finalist placings than other community radio show. In 2014, a Leopold Bloom tribute special on Nelson Mandela and the music of South Africa won best community access programme, and the South Africa New Zealand Association Mandela Memorial Programme on Planet FM won best spoken programme.

Edward Swift won best new broadcaster in 2010 for his work on the morning show Plains FM and has since gone on to work for Newstalk ZB and Radio Sport. Plains FM has also picked up awards for Sounds Catholic, A Belch on Sport, Japanese Downunder, Joanna Cobley's The Museum Detective, Tim's Talk and Janet Secker's Focus On Arts. A station staff member Naoko Kudo was recognised in 2008 by sister access station Fresh FM at their Fresh FM Vox Radio Audio Theatre Award for Aki's Adventures Downunder.

== Programmes ==
Most Access Radio Network programmes are English-language. However, the metro stations broadcast many Chinese, Hindi, Samoan, Tokeluan and Tongan language programmes. Nationally, there are a handful of programmes in Assyrian, Burmese, Chichewa, Gujarati, Indonesian, Japanese, Khmer, Korean, Nepali, Persian, Filipino, Sinhala, Somali, Tagalog, Tamil, Urdu and Vietnamese languages - mostly on Planet FM. Some Pacific community programmes are broadcast in Cook Islands Māori, Niuean and Fijian. There are also programmes for European migrants and language learners in Croatian, French, German, Greek, Italian, Polish, Russian and Spanish.

=== Music ===
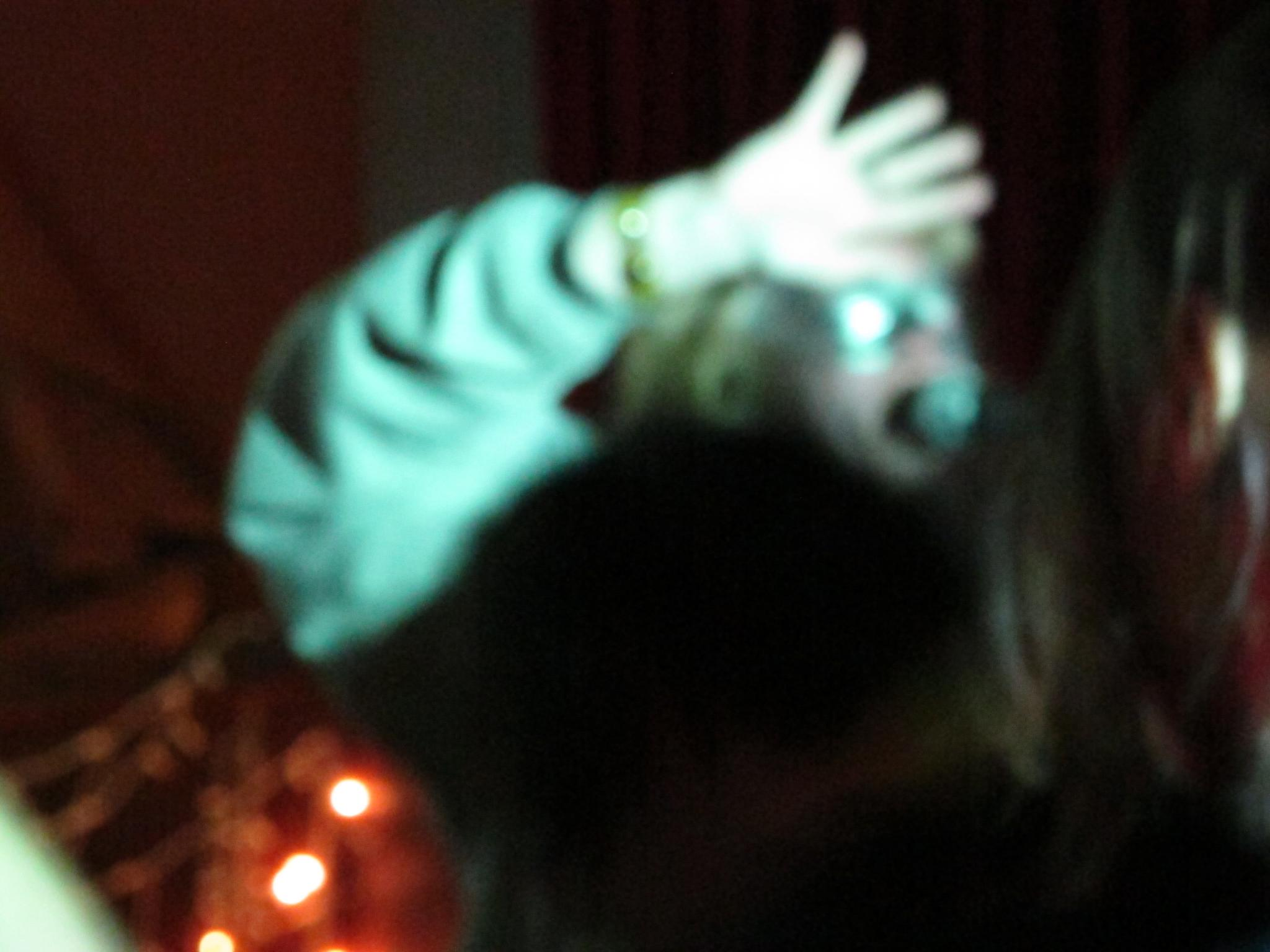
The Futurians got some of their first radio airplay on the Access Radio Network.

The stations broadcast a wide range of specialist Scottish, jazz, blues, metal, brass, hip-hop, Latin and country music shows. Free FM Hamilton has shows for Asian pop, rock, bluegrass, electronic, vocal, reggae and garage punk. Otago Access Radio has experimental, pop, indie, vinyl, Afrocaribbean, jazz, stage and screen, Māori, German and women's music programmes, and a show dedicated to the work of Michael Jackson.

Otago's Less Signal programme is an hour of experimental music, noise, free improvisation, drone and musique concrète; talking with local practitioners, aficionados and promoters and highlighting performances and releases. The band the Futurians claim the show was one of the first to interview them and play their music.

=== Arts ===
Some programmes review arts, books, film, poetry and visual arts, while others focus on local artists in Southland, Otago, Canterbury, the Kāpiti Coast, Hawke's Bay and Waikato. Nelson Arts Festival, Nelson Evolve Festival, Nelson Village Theatre, Dunedin Botanic Gardens, Dunedin Public Libraries, The Globe Theatre Palmerston North and Meeanee Earthcare Gardenshare also have their own radio shows.

Crime writer Vanda Symon hosts a writing show on Otago Access Radio sponsored by the Otago branch of the New Zealand Society of Authors. It has featured interviews with local authors like Fiona Farrell and Philip Temple through to international authors like Diana Gabaldon and Annie Proulx. Former Workers Party of New Zealand candidate Don Franks presents a show of his original music and commentary on Access Radio Wellington.

=== Culture ===
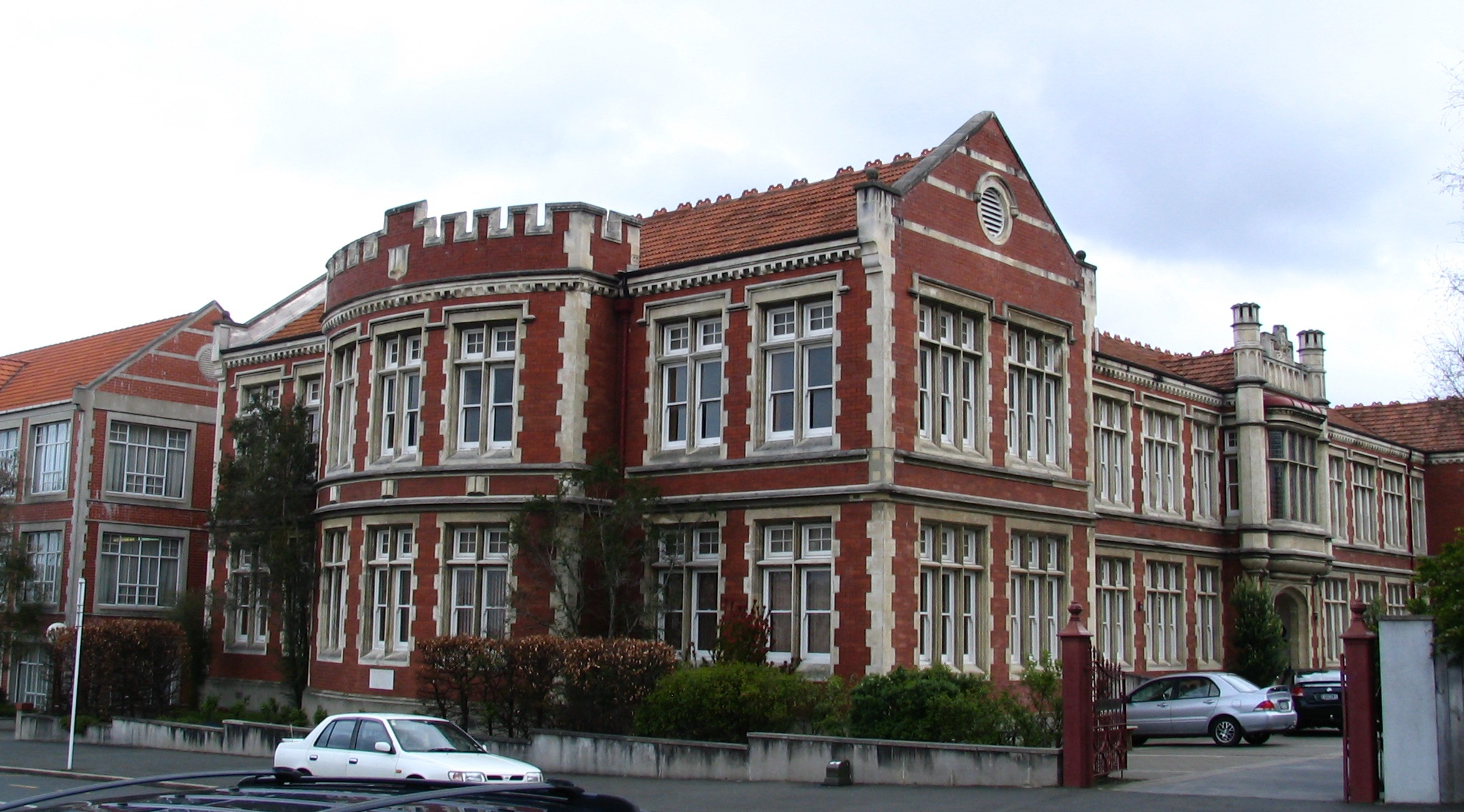
Otago Girls' High School has its own community radio show.

Members of Otago's Chinese, Italian, Samoan and Japanese communities, Canterbury's English community, Wellington's Japanese and Jewish communities, Manawatu's Irish, Russian and Bhutanese communities, and Hawke's Bay's Dutch community host shows. Access Radio Wellington, Coast Access Radio, Access Manawatu and Free FM Hamilton have shows on gay, lesbian and transgender issues, while Plains FM Canterbury has a shown about men's issues.

Otago Access Radio features of a raft of local youth shows about comedy, online personalities, multiculturalism, children's stories, music and leaving school. Aoraki Polytechnic, Otago University, Otago Girls' High School, Kaikorai Valley College, Queens High School, Kāpiti College and several primary schools have their own shows. Several young people also host programmes about news, celebrities, social justice, sports, health, teen issues, worker rights and motherhood. The Great Big Kids Show with Suzy Cato airs at various times on Free FM, Access Radio Taranaki, Fresh FM, Plains FM, Otago Access Radio and Radio Southland.

=== Religion ===
The Access Radio Network has Eckankar, Baháʼí, Buddhist, spiritualism, New Age, spirituality, meditation and interfaith programmes, and shows dedicated to Maitreya, Sai Baba and Ching Hai. With Rhema Media reaching evangelical Christian audiences and Radio New Zealand Concert featuring traditional Christian hymns, access stations serve other Christian audiences through specialist Catholic, Chinese Christian, Christian Science, Reformed Church, Gospel music, Greek Orthodox, Hindi Christian, Samoan Baptist, Wesley Methodist, Bible and ecumenical programmes.

Radio Kidnappers volunteer Charles Herb Peterson has received a Hastings Civic Honour Award for his Sunday night Christian programme At Close of Day. Broadcasting since April 1995 and partially sponsored by the Salvation Army, the show includes contemporary and alternative music, Christian commentary and devotional messages.

=== Current affairs ===
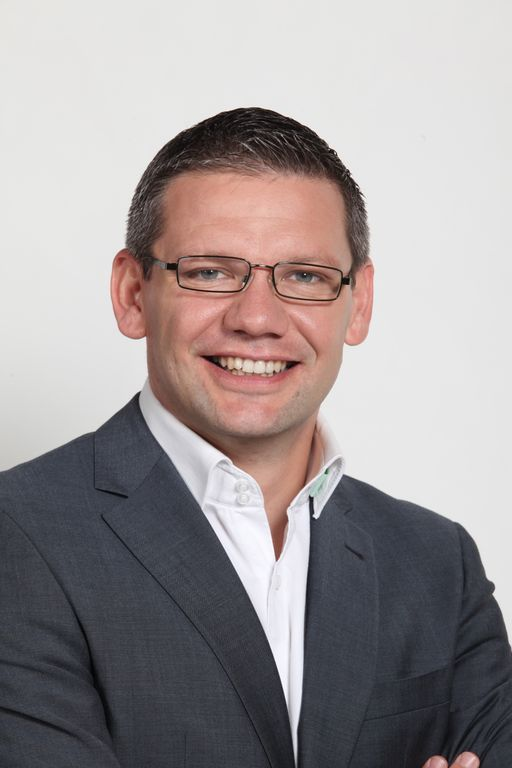
Iain Lees-Galloway is one of many politicians who host shows or segments on community radio.

Parliament Today programmes like Today in Parliament and A Week in Parliament are fully funded by the New Zealand Parliament and available for access radio stations to broadcast free-of-charge. Many others purchase broadcast rights to BBC World Service, Women's International Newsgathering Service and Democracy Now! programmes through community sponsorship.

Free FM, Radio Kidnappers, Access Manawatu, Coast Access Radio and Otago Access Radio have programmes dedicated to Parliamentary and council politics, and Otago Access Radio and Access Radio Wellington have weekly shows on women's issues. There are local shows for Nawton, Hutt City, Golden Bay and North-East Dunedin.

Several politicians, like Labour MP Iain Lees-Galloway, New Zealand First MP Darroch Ball, Palmerston North mayor Grant Smith, and Palmerston North city councillor Vaughan Dennison host their own shows. Access Manawatu has a show about setting up start-ups, Free FM has a men's rights programme, Otago Access Radio has a show about creating homes without domestic violence, and Massey University academic Cat Pausé presented a show about fat feminism and acceptance.

=== Special interests ===
Otago Access Radio broadcasts Sustainable Lens - Resilience on Radio, a programme about sustainable living hosted by Samuel Mann and Shane Gallagher and sponsored by Otago Polytechnic. Most episodes feature experts from the likes of the University of Otago, AUT University, Falmouth University, Blekinge Institute of Technology, University of Cambridge, University of Plymouth, University of Nottingham, Aarhus University, Greenpeace New Zealand and Kermadec Initiative. Some politicians, like Michael Woodhouse, Jan Logie and Grant Robertson, have also appeared on the show.

Other programmes on Otago Access focus on e-waste and anti-oil activism, while other access stations have shows covering environmentalism more broadly. Otago Access Radio, Plains FM, Fresh FM, Radio Kidnappers and Free FM all have their own local gardening programmes. There are also programmes on world wrestling, Manawatu speedway, Southland rugby, the New Zealand Special Olympics team, gaming, social media and living in motor homes.

=== Health and welfare ===
There are shows on several medical conditions like cancer multiple sclerosis, Aspergers, Asthma, blindness, disabilities, diabetes, alcoholism, Alzheimers or recovering from strokes and treatments like herbal medicine, acupuncture, homeopathy, natural medicine, hypnotherapy and Biblical medicine. Other programmes focus on broader health issues like nutrition, special needs, mental health, suicide, gambling addiction, pregnancy, safe sex, general well-being and physical fitness.

Many organisations have their own shows, including the New Zealand Fire Service, Dog Rescue Dunedin, Dunedin Budget Advisory Service, community law centres, Unions Manawatu, Manawatu Tenants' Union and Palmerston North Community Services. Local branches of Grey Power and the Returned Services' Association also make shows for older audiences.

== Stations ==
=== Wellington Access Radio ===
Wellington Access Radio broadcasts on 106.1FM frequency from Mt Kaukau, reaching Wellington, Porirua and the Hutt Valley. Its weekly line-up includes more than 80 programmes in more than 20 languages, primarily catering to local Wellington communities.

Founded in April 1981, Wellington Access is the country's first and oldest access radio station. Its model of raising money through membership fees for supporters and airtime fees for programme-makers has been emulated by other stations, as has its commitment to providing a platform for people who aren't usually heard on mainstream radio. In particular, the station aims to cater to ethnic, sexual and religious minorities, children and young people, and people with disabilities.

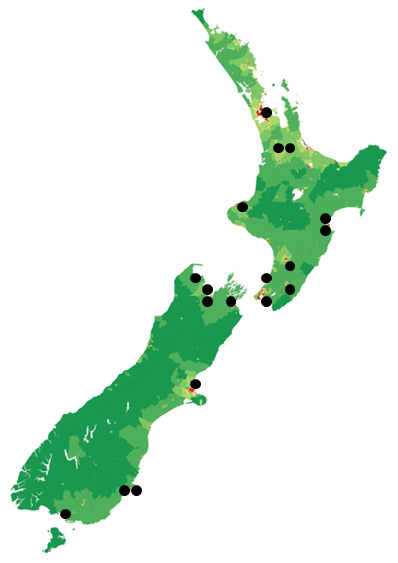
This map shows the population density of New Zealand, and the location of Access Radio Network frequencies.

Running since the early 90s Aakashwani Bharat Bhavan is the oldest weekly show which is continuing to inform and entertain Bollywood music lovers. A mix of Hindi, Gujarati movie songs and local content has made it popular amongst the Indian community. Proudly sponsored by the Wellington Indian Association, the show is produced and hosted by Neelima Bhula, Mukesh Jeram and Beena Patel. Visit accessradio.org.nz to listen live or download the podcast.

=== Planet FM Auckland ===
Planet FM broadcasts on 104.6 FM in Auckland. It began as Access Community Radio Auckland in 1987, broadcasting on temporary licenses until it secured a permanent 810 AM frequency in 1989. It transitioned to 104.6 FM and rebranded as Planet FM in 2000, and is now based in the Mt Albert campus of Unitec Institute of Technology. In 2004, the New Zealand Peace Foundation gave it a Special Achievement Award in recognition of its commitment to communication and tolerance. In exchange for airtime fees and membership subscriptions, the station provides facilities and training to its programme makers.

Auckland has more radio stations per capita than other city in the world, and almost half its population are overseas-born or come from migrant communities. Planet FM provides a platform for almost 40 cultures and several communities who it believes are not served by other radio stations or media outlets. The station is one of New Zealand's most multilingual media outlets, and broadcasts in English, Tongan, Arabic, Mandarin, Singhalese, Niuean, Punjabi, Tamil, Cantonese, Khmer, Telugu, Tagalog, Hindi, Nepali, Spanish, Italian, Gujarati, Marathi and Afrikaans.

=== Free FM Hamilton ===
Free FM broadcasts on 89.0 FM in Hamilton. It began as AM1206 in 1992 and was renamed Community Radio Hamilton 1206 AM in 2004. After raising more than $100,000 to expand its reach and lobbying the Government for support, the station was granted a new FM frequency in October 2011 when the Ministry for Culture and Heritage re-designated the 89.0 mHz frequency for general community use. The station rebranded to Free FM and organised events in several Waikato towns to recognise its transition to FM in October 2012.

The new full-power frequency allows the station to reach a much wider area than its previous AM and low-power frequencies, with coverage north of Huntly, south of Tokoroa, east of Te Aroha and west of Raglan. The station now has more than a hundred volunteers and produces over eighty shows every week. It station is operated by Waikato Community Broadcasting Charitable Trust, which supplements Government funding with grants from community trusts.

=== Plains FM Canterbury ===
Christchurch-based Plains FM has been broadcasting in Canterbury on 96.9FM since 29 February 1988. Part of the station's schedule is dedicated to programmes for under-represented groups like women, children and young people, and ethnic minorities - including programmes in at least 18 migrant languages. Fee-paying groups are provided with training and facilities to produce programmes for local communities and specific interests. At other times, the station follows an adult album alternative format, with swing, blues, roots/acoustic, alt country, soul, world and New Zealand music.

Plains FM communicated emergency messages in several languages after the September 2010 Darfield earthquake, but its Civil Defence role was initially limited after the February 2011 Christchurch earthquake. The Plains FM building was green-stickered and safe to enter, but staff were prevented from crossing the red zone cordon to access broadcast equipment for 5 weeks. Station management continue to work with local agencies and Civil Defence to develop their role for all future disaster response programmes. Plains FM also obtained a grant from Lions Club International for an onsite generator and updated their technical infra-structure. Key volunteers will be used in disaster reporting in the future in order to keep local CALD communities informed.

=== Access Radio Taranaki ===
Access Radio Taranaki broadcasts in Taranaki on 104.4 FM. Almost 120 community groups were consulted and over 75 had signed up for broadcast hours before Access Radio Taranaki could make a case for New Zealand on Air funding and begin broadcasting in July 2010. A limited access service operated as far back as 1981, when Radio New Zealand allowed community radio programmes to be carried by Parliamentary broadcaster 2YB on Saturday mornings. In its modern form, at least 40 percent of the station's funding comes from local community trusts, council grants and private donations.

Access Radio Taranaki invites a broad range of groups to make programmes, and refuses to exercise any editorial censorship or oversight. It is the only radio station in the southern hemisphere with a radio show hosted by a young person with Down syndrome, and gears its musical playlist to the tastes of audiences at different times of the day. Local community boards south of Mount Taranaki have funded mobile broadcast technology to allow South Taranaki schools and cultural, medical and special interest groups to prerecord their own radio programmes.

=== Radio Hawke's Bay ===
Radio Hawke's Bay (renamed from Radio Kidnappers August 2022) broadcasts on 1431 AM across the Hawke's Bay and 104.7 FM in Napier. It has broadcast in Hawke's Bay on AM since 1995 and FM since the early 2000s, reaching most of the region from Wairoa and Mahia in the north and Waipawaa and Waipukurau in the south. It is also available in Dannevirke, Gisborne and Taupo at night or during certain atmospheric conditions. The station includes many non-mainstream and non-professional radio programmes, including migrant language shows, school debating competitions, and political debates.

=== Manawatu People's Radio ===
Access Manawatu broadcasts on 999 AM in Manawatu. It operates up to 13 hours each day, and includes many shows about groups, hobbies, interests, faiths and communities that are not represented in other media. Its 999 AM frequency reaches as far as Marton and Porewa in the north, Woodville and Pahiatua in the east, and Foxton and Shannon in the south. The station is owned by Manawatu Access Radio Charitable Trust and receives funding from Palmerston North City Council, Destination Manawatu and other funding bodies.

In addition to providing training, support, studios and remote broadcast facilities for programme-makers, Access Manawatu offers community event assistance, organises a summer concert series, provides summer school and school leaver radio training, and broadcasts the work of local musicians.

=== Arrow FM Wairarapa ===
Arrow FM broadcasts on 92.7 FM in the Wairarapa. Since being set up on 2 March 1986, Arrow FM has gone from three-hour weekly broadcast to a nonstop-operation. Over the years it has featured programmes from Rape Crisis, Trade Aid, the local library, film society, schools and minority groups. With a limited number of shows, New Zealand music takes up most of the station's airtime. Masterton District Council, Carterton District Council and various funding bodies support the station's operation.

=== Coast Access Kapiti ===
Coast Access broadcasts on 104.7 FM on the Kāpiti Coast. A small group of volunteers formed Coast Access Radio in 1996, and began broadcasting during the Christmas of 1997 1512 kHz (AM) initially from a studio in Waikanae Museum. The station moved into a Community Centre in Aputa House and began leasing the 96.7 FM frequency from Rhema Media, before it was granted the Crown-reserved 104.9 FM frequency in 2004. Coast Access adjusted to 104.7 FM in 2012, and shifted into a new purpose-built studio in 2014. Coast Access broadcasts a live weekday breakfast show, Friday afternoon show and Friday drive show, and has received more than 20 finalist placings in the New Zealand Radio Awards for its minority programmes.

=== Fresh FM Nelson ===
Fresh FM Logo from 2009

Fresh FM (Te Reo Irirangi o Te Tau Ihu o Te Waka a Maui) broadcasts on 104.8 FM in Nelson, 107.2 LPFM in Nelson, 95.0 FM in Tākaka, and 88.9 FM in Blenheim. It was formed under the umbrella Tasman Broadcasting Trust in 1994 when New Zealand On Air asked Boulder Radio in Nelson and Harvest Radio at Te Awhina Marae Motueka to merge and combine their resources. New Zealand on Air covers about 65 percent of operating costs, and remaining funding are drawn from limited general advertising, programme sponsorship, Club Fresh listener subscriptions and private donations.

The station broadcasts across Nelson and Tasman on 104.8 FM, in central Nelson on 107.2 FM in central Nelson, in Tākaka on 95.0 FM and in Blenheim on 88.9 FM. It operates studios in Nelson, Motueka and Tākaka, and has plans to open a fourth studio in Blenheim. Its programming includes local drama, music and documentaries about life in the northern South Island. No other access station serves such a vast area, with four frequencies in three regions - and no other station operates from multiple studios in different locations.

=== Otago Access Radio ===
Otago Access Radio broadcasts on 1575 kHz (AM) across Otago and 105.4 MHz in Dunedin (FM). Lesley Paris leads its small group of paid employees and larger group of volunteers. The station began in 1990, renaming as Hills AM in 1995, before changing its name again to Toroa Radio in September 2008 - named after the toroa (or albatross) colony at Taiaroa Head on Otago Peninsula. It adopted its current name in March 2011, and moved to its current FM frequency in 2012.

=== Radio Southland ===
Radio Southland broadcasts on 96.4 FM in Southland. It provides training and airtime for people of all backgrounds to present live radio, including women, children, young people, disabled people and people from ethnic minorities. The station brands itself as "locally-owned" and "the voice of the community", and broadcasts the daily Crave Rave Breakfast Show and other local shows. Its schedule also includes programmes from other Association members, and regular New Zealand music segments.
