= Hamilton Circle Jerk =

The Hamilton Circle Jerk is an annual music event in Hamilton, New Zealand. Named after a mutual masturbatory act, the Circle Jerk features 15 Hamilton bands performing 3 song sets, two songs by other Hamilton musicians as well as an original.

The first Circle Jerk was held in 2005. Local student radio station Contact FM has been running the event since 2008.

== See also ==
- Hamilton, New Zealand
