= Solomon Islands Broadcasting Corporation =

- Country: Solomon Islands
- Launch date: 1976 (radio); 1992 (television)
- Former names: Solomon Islands Broadcasting Service (SIBS)
- Official website: www.sibconline.com.sb

Solomon Islands Broadcasting Corporation (SIBC) is the official radio broadcaster of Solomon Islands. SIBC is self-defined as a public service broadcaster.

Because early records are missing, the early history of broadcasting in Solomon Islands is clouded in mystery. American Armed Forces Radio began broadcasts in what was then the British Solomon Islands in the 1940s during World War II, when military forces of the U.S. landed there to free the islands from the Japanese.

After the war, the U.S. military briefly ran a station, operated by the Mosquito Radio Network. Shortwave radio broadcasting in the British Solomon Islands began in 1956. The Solomon Islands Broadcasting Corporation was founded in 1976, replacing the Solomon Islands Broadcasting System (SIBS). It began the first television service on the islands in 1992.

Among SIBC's stated purposes are to "facilitate educational programs", "record and promote local and contemporary music", and "promote unity in a scattered island nation with diverse cultures".

SIBC operates two national radio stations, Radio Happy Isles and Wantok FM, and two local ones, Radio Happy Lagoon in Western Province, and Radio Temotu in Temotu Province.

SIBC currently broadcasts on two frequencies in AM: MF at 1035 kHz and HF at 5020 kHz.

In 2014, the Solomon Islands Broadcasting Corporation (SIBC) commissioned Unskramble IT (Formerly known as Consulting Panel) to build a new website digital strategy and integrate live streaming radio.
