= Legislature broadcasters in New Zealand =

Television broadcasters of the New Zealand Parliament

Parliament TV / AM Network
- The Parliament TV logo
- Country: New Zealand
- Broadcast area: New Zealand
- Headquarters: Wellington, New Zealand

Programming
- Picture format: 576i 16:9 (SDTV)

Ownership
- Owner: New Zealand Parliament

History
- Launched: 9 October 2007 (television broadcasting)

Links
- Website: Parliament TV; Video live stream AM Network; Audio live stream

Availability

Terrestrial
- Freeview: Channel 31
- AM frequencies: Various

Legislature broadcasters in New Zealand are broadcasters of the New Zealand Parliament House of Representatives. Television channel Parliament TV and radio network AM Network are funded by the New Zealand House of Representatives to broadcast full and unedited coverage of its proceedings. The Office of the Clerk also funds a fully independent written, audio and video political reporting service of Parliamentary proceedings called Parliament Today.

Sitting hours are seasonal and are generally within five weekly sessions. Normal sittings are 14:00 and 18:00 Tuesdays; 19:30 and 22:00 Tuesday nights; 14:00 and 18:00 Wednesdays; 19:30 and 22:00 Wednesday nights; and 14:00 and 18:00 Thursdays. Special circumstances can allow Parliament to sit under urgency, usually between 09:00 Tuesday morning and 24:00 Saturday evening.

== History ==
Prior to the AM Network, parliamentary broadcasts were carried on the Concert programme, with New Zealand becoming the first country in the world to regularly broadcast parliament proceedings on 25 March 1936.

Veteran press gallery journalist and political commentator Charles Wheeler introduced the broadcast of the opening of the 25th Parliament, with Speaker-elect Barnard. Wheeler told listeners on the first broadcast that "for the first time in the history of New Zealand broadcasting, the microphone has been introduced into Parliament itself so that even the most distant elector may gain some first-hand knowledge of the more important happenings". He said New Zealand was blazing the trail in allowing parliamentary broadcasts.

Since the 1980s, the AM Network has used to broadcast all live Parliamentary proceedings in full. On 17 July 2007, Parliamentary coverage was expanded to television.

== Services ==
=== Parliament TV ===
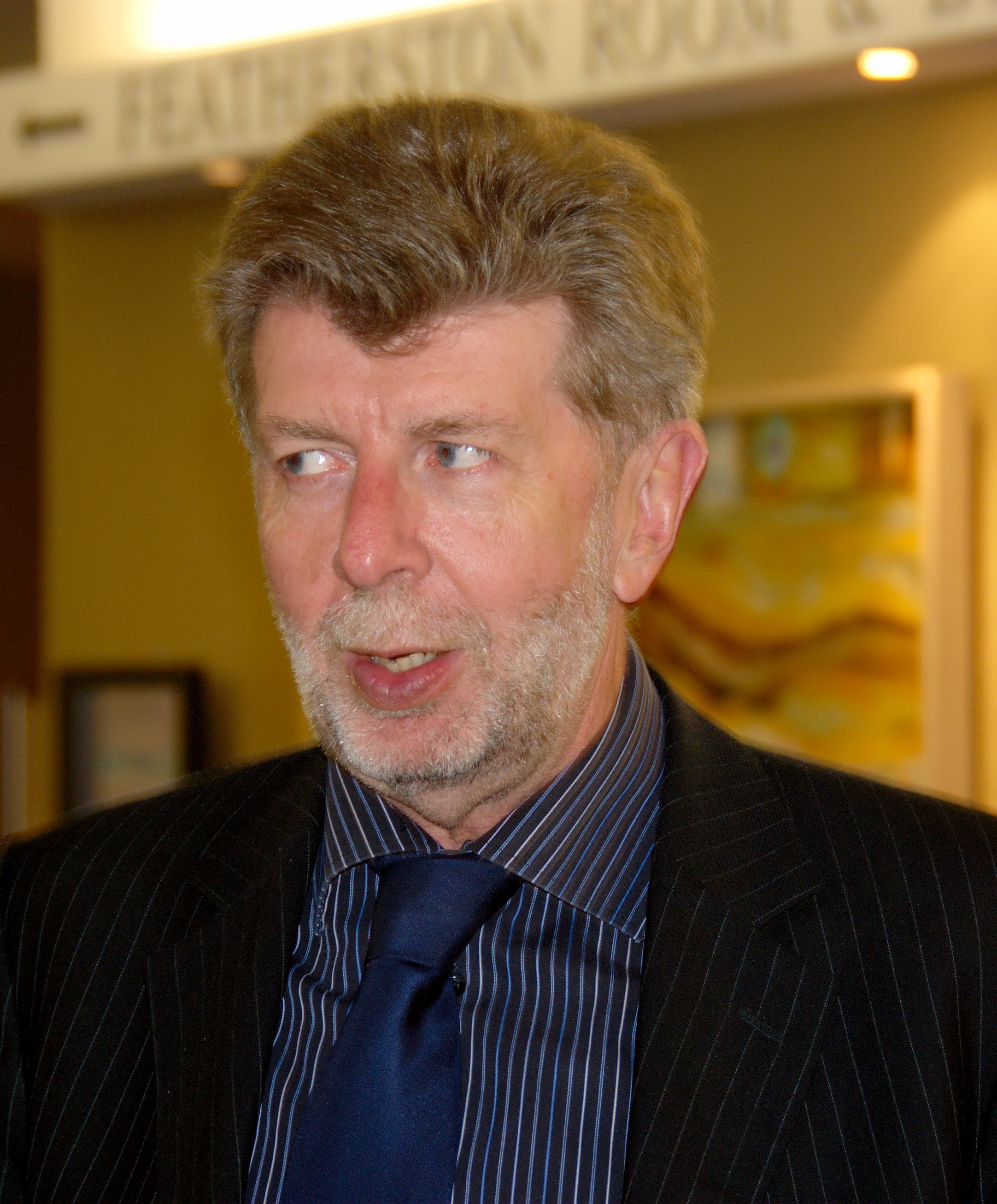
The popularity of a video of a Parliamentary speech by Maurice Williamson led to him being invited to appear on The Ellen DeGeneres Show.

Parliament TV is managed by Kordia under a long-term contract to the House of Representatives. and is made freely available to media companies. It broadcasts though media such as TVNZ and MediaWorks New Zealand, as streaming video on the Internet, and, since 9 October 2007, on Freeview channel 31 and Sky Channel 086.

Programming on Parliament TV is limited to live coverage of Parliament and scheduled repeats of Question Time on Parliamentary sitting days. It closes down outside non-sitting hours.

=== In The House ===
Christchurch-based Tandem Studios is contracted to the Clerk of the House to live stream Parliament TV's broadcasts, and record, re-format and re-purpose the coverage as small highlight package videos on their In The House website and YouTube account. More than 22,000 videos have been uploaded, and the company claims the videos have received more than 3 million views.

Several videos from the final reading of the Marriage (Definition of Marriage) Amendment Act 2013 were redistributed by The New Zealand Herald and other media. A video of one speech in favour of the Act, by National Party MP Maurice Williamson, went viral on YouTube, Huffington Post, Gawker, New York Times and Pink News. It was broadcast on The Ellen DeGeneres Show, with Williamson later declining an invitation to appear on the show.

=== AM Network ===
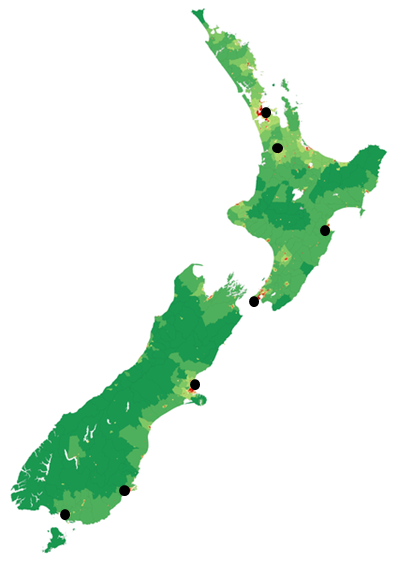
Map of the AM Network frequencies.

The AM Network is operated by Radio New Zealand under a similar contract, and uses a nationwide set of AM broadcasting transmitters that were previously used by The Concert Programme before it switched to FM broadcasting. The broadcasts are also available online, via live-streaming and through on-demand podcasts. The AM Network's Parliamentary broadcasts do not include continuity announcers or news bulletins, unlike other Radio New Zealand networks.

In total, Radio New Zealand produces an estimated 17 hours of live Parliamentary broadcasting and just over an hour of packaged extracts. The Radio New Zealand smartphone app allows listeners to follow individual Parliamentary sittings on Apple and Android mobile devices. The broadcaster claims its iPhone App has been downloaded more than 50,000 times since it was first introduced in 2011.

The AM Network's closedown hours were originally used by Sports Roundup. Since 1997, Christian broadcaster Rhema Media has consistently leased this time to broadcast the low-budget easy listening Star radio network. Despite AM Network being technically owned by Radio New Zealand, Star broadcasts Newstalk ZB Affiliates Unit hourly news bulletins during the air time it leases. AM Network's North Island frequencies are Auckland 882 AM, Waikato 1494 AM, Hawke's Bay 909 AM and Wellington and Tauranga 657 AM. In the South Island, it broadcasts on Canterbury 963 AM, Dunedin 900 AM and Invercargill 1314 AM.

=== Parliament Today ===
The Office of the Clerk also fully funds a political reporting service, providing written, audio and video summaries from the debating chamber and committee rooms of the House of Representatives completely independently from Radio New Zealand. It is the country's only consistent source of regular reports of parliamentary proceedings, with live reports of debates and decisions in the chamber from independent press gallery journalists Tom Frewen and Rheesh Lyon.

Clerk of the House David McGee established the service in 1994, hoping to replicate the success BBC Radio 4 show Today in Parliament has had since 1945. Parliament Today programmes summarise the most significant events and highlights from Question Time, debates and select committees, utilising audio from the AM Network for rebroadcast on other stations. Kiwi FM, the community access stations, the student radio stations and other stations broadcast the programmes around the country, and Radio New Zealand International broadcasts the programmes around the Pacific.

Each sitting week the service produces three daily programmes on sitting days, a weekly five-minute programme, a weekly ten minute programme, weekly 15 minute programme, a weekly 28 minute programme and a weekly 5 minute Select Committee report.

The service ceased in 2016.
