= Contact FM =

New Zealand radio station

Contact FM is a student radio station in Hamilton, New Zealand. It operates from the University of Waikato in Hamilton. It broadcasts on the 88.1 MHz FM frequency, having previously broadcast on 106 MHz, 89.0 MHz and 1440 kHz. The original Contact FM, owned by the Waikato Students Union, was broadcast on 89.0 MHz from 1985 to 1998. During a period of voluntary student unionism, the WSU subleased the frequency to private ownership, along with selling Contact FM's equipment. Specialist shows have included the Prognosis Show, a progressive rock show hosted by Richard Stockwell on Saturday nights from 1996 to 1997. The show also included space music, krautrock, psychedelic music, electronic music and experimental Music.

The Independent Broadcasting Community relaunched Contact on a low-power frequency 106 MHz, before settling with its current frequency of 88.1 MHz. The station celebrated its 30th birthday in October 2009. The current Management Committee of the Independent Broadcasting Community (Hamilton) Incorporated, who run Contact FM, is chairperson Nick Johnston, treasurer Daniel Farrell, secretary Lauren Kerr Bell, and officers Ayman Aneece, Shane Griffin and Luke Jacobs.

Contact hosts many local Hamilton music events. Since 2008, it has run annual Hamilton music festival Hamilton Circle Jerk. The event features 15 Hamilton bands performing 3 song sets, two songs by other Hamilton musicians as well as an original. The festival had previously struggled to attract sponsorship, in part due to being controversially named after the mutual masturbatory act.
