= RNZ Concert =

New Zealand public radio network

RNZ Concert Te Reo Irirangi o Aotearoa Kōnohete
- Wellington; New Zealand
- Broadcast area: New Zealand
- Frequencies: FM: Various; Freeview: Channel 51; Sky Digital: Channel 422

Programming
- Format: Classical, Jazz

Ownership
- Owner: Radio New Zealand
- Sister stations: RNZ National; RNZ Pacific

History
- First air date: February 24, 1933; 93 years ago (as 2YC)
- Former names: 2YC, The YC Network; Concert Programme (1975–1996); Concert FM (1996–2007); Radio New Zealand Concert (2007–2016)

Technical information
- Transmitter coordinates: 41°17′20″S 174°46′38″E

Links
- Webcast: Listen Live
- Website: rnz.co.nz/concert

RNZ Concert (Māori: Te Reo Irirangi o Aotearoa Kōnohete) is a publicly funded non-commercial New Zealand FM fine music radio network. Radio New Zealand owns the network and operates it from its Wellington headquarters. The network's playlist of classical, jazz, contemporary, and world music includes recordings by local musicians and composers. Around 15 percent of its airtime features live concerts, orchestral performances, operas, interviews, features, and specialty music programs, many of them recorded locally.

The network's specialist production department commissions work, initiates music programs, and records live broadcasts of concerts and recitals from local and visiting international musicians. RNZ Concert received the Arts Foundation of New Zealand Governor's Award. RNZ Concert draws content from its international counterparts, including Australia's ABC Classic, the European Broadcasting Union, Chicago's WFMT Radio Network, and BBC Radio 3.

== History ==
=== Early history ===
This was the Concert Programme logo when it was launched in 1975

Classical music broadcasting began in New Zealand with the opening of 2YC in Wellington on 24 February 1933, with further YC stations starting in Auckland, Christchurch and Dunedin in the following couple of years (see Call signs in New Zealand). In 1936, these four stations as well as the YA and ZB stations (forerunners to RNZ National and Newstalk ZB) were organised under the auspices of the New Zealand Broadcasting Service.

Stations were modelled after the BBC's Third Programme, and routinely broadcast local musicians in studio. The National Orchestra (now the New Zealand Symphony Orchestra) was founded within the NZBS and its very first concert from the Wellington Town Hall in February 1947 was broadcast live on 2YC. The four YC stations and other regional stations in the same format eventually began taking networked programming from Wellington under the banner of "The YC Network", and these stations in 1975 unified nationwide to form the "Concert Programme" under a reorganised Radio New Zealand.

=== Breakup of RNZ ===
The growth of private commercial radio and Radio New Zealand's commercial assets by the fourth National government in the 1990s changed the environment in which the Concert Programme operated. Radio New Zealand's commercial stations were sold to The Radio Network (later known as NZME), and RNZ became a Crown entity, continuing to operate National Radio (now RNZ National) and a renamed "Concert FM". Concert lost many of its music studios including Broadcasting House in Wellington, much prized by orchestras and classical musicians for recording, Until the launch of the AM Network in 1997, the network carried live coverage of the proceedings of the New Zealand Parliament.

=== Recent history ===
Since 2000, the network has aired a New Year's Day countdown from an annual survey of New Zealand's 65 most popular fine music tracks. First-placed pieces have included Handel's Messiah and Schumann's Konzertstuck first movement, and a majority of high-ranking pieces have come from English composers. The highest-ranked pieces are performed live by the Auckland Philharmonia Orchestra during the previous November, at concerts hosted by well-known New Zealanders like John Campbell and Wallace Chapman. A print advertising campaign showing the musical scores of popular tracks depicted as battle scenes has been used to promote the countdown since 2012.

On 22 January 2007 Concert FM was renamed Radio New Zealand Concert to associate it more clearly with the Radio New Zealand brand, which was subsequently shortened to RNZ Concert in 2016. As part of its promotion of New Zealand Music Month, the network has produced a series of podcasts of New Zealand performances of classic works. NZ On Air contributes $130,000 each year towards local recordings made by RNZ Concert through SOUNZ - Centre for New Zealand Music's Resound Project.

=== War commemorations ===
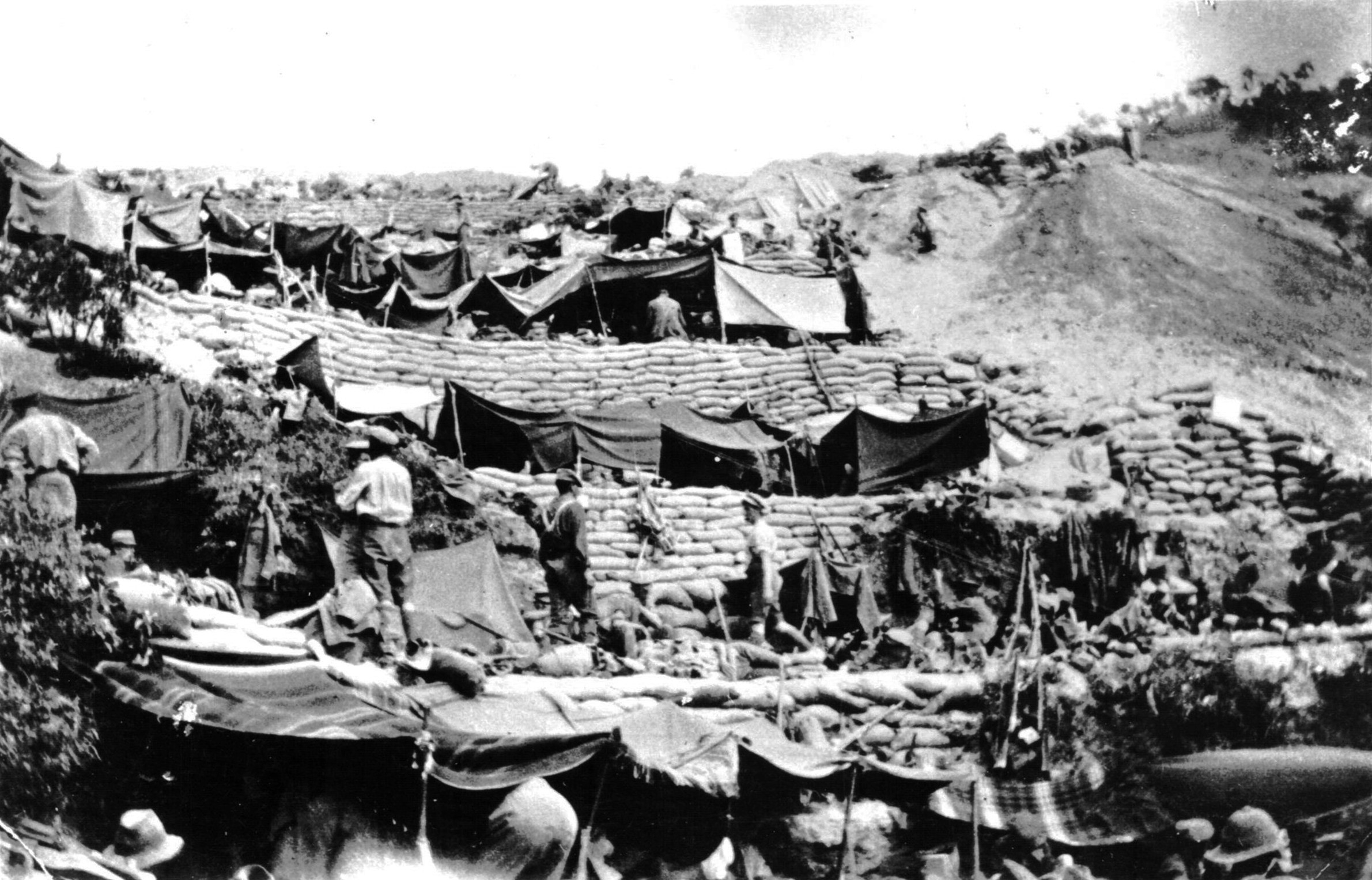
RNZ Concert is involved in several events commemorating the ANZAC Gallipoli Campaign.

RNZ Concert has been involved in several contests and performances commemorating Anzac Day and the centenary of World War I. In 2014, it broadcast a concert featuring the five finalists of a one-off secondary school song-writing competition - 'The Calling' - in which students had to reflect the emotional impact the declaration of World War I had on New Zealand families through an original musical score.

In the same year it ran a joint competition with ABC Classic FM and the Australian Department for Veterans' Affairs - Gallipoli Songs - for original compositions that best reflected the experiences of the original ANZAC troops and their families. Australian soprano Merlyn Quaife, Australian composer Elliott Gyger, ABC host Stephen Adams, RNZ host Kate Mead and New Zealand composer Dame Gillian Whitehead judged the competition - and New Zealand composer Andrew Baldwin was one of the six winners. The compositions were performed, recorded and broadcast on RNZ Concert and ABC Classic FM on Anzac Day 2015.

=== Funding and proposed changes to service ===
RNZ is fully funded by the government through New Zealand on Air, but its funding has been nominally frozen since the election of the fifth National government in 2008. During his time as broadcasting minister in 2008 to 2011, National MP Jonathan Coleman asked the organisation to consider alternative revenue sources, including listener donations and commercial sponsorship of RNZ Concert programmes, to help cover the network's operating costs. Commercial sponsorship has been criticised by opposition MPs and activism group Save RNZ, was rejected by former chief executive Peter Cavanagh, and continues to be resisted by current chief executive Paul Thompson.

The Concert programme has drawn criticism for its Government funding. It has faced allegations of elitism, left-wing bias, and serving wealthy audiences and minority interests. Equally, it has been accused of closely following commercial radio formats and failing to perform as a public broadcaster without commercial constraints. Supporters of the network have said it performs well on a small budget. In response, David Farrar has called for the station to be scrapped, saying it "plays basically German classical music" when "almost every piece of classical music in history is available for free and can be streamed, made into playlists and the like".

On 5 February 2020, RNZ announced plans to lay off most of RNZ Concert's staff, including all presenters. The plan would shift broadcasts from its FM frequencies to the AM Network and make the station presenterless, more akin to a music streaming service than a traditional radio station. This was to free up resources and FM frequencies for a new youth-focused network. Opponents of the plan, including Dame Kiri te Kanawa and Helen Clark, call the cuts "very concerning" and question whether youth would even tune in the proposed new radio service. The proposed changes were eventually dropped.

== Live performances ==
=== New Zealand Symphony Orchestra ===
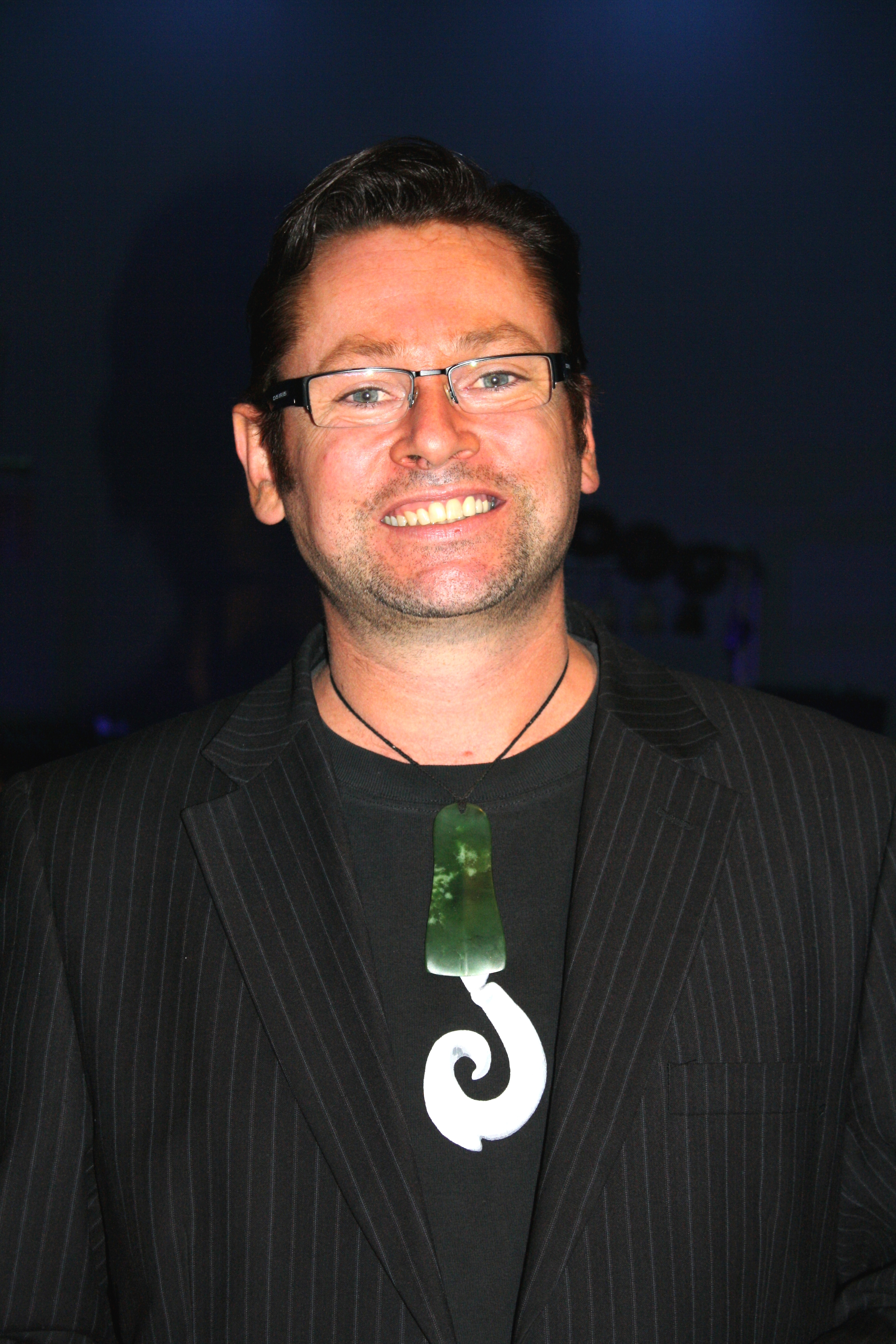
Several New Zealand Symphony Orchestra performances of Gareth Farr compositions have been broadcast on RNZ Concert.

Recorded performances of the New Zealand Symphony Orchestra have been one of the cornerstones of the programming since the orchestra was first formed. The orchestra began as a department of the New Zealand Broadcasting Corporation, which later became Radio New Zealand, in 1946.

Despite the formal separation, Symphony Orchestra performances continue to be recorded, broadcast and archived by RNZ Concert. Auckland Town Hall, Wellington Town Hall and Michael Fowler Centre performances are broadcast live-to-air and streamed online, and performances in other centres or overseas cities are usually recorded and broadcast at a later date. On many occasions the pieces are from prominent composers, like Gustav Mahler, Pyotr Ilyich Tchaikovsky, Ludwig van Beethoven, Sergei Prokofiev or Felix Mendelssohn-Bartholdy. On other occasions, they are the work of local composers like Gareth Farr, John Psathas, Eve de Castro-Robinson, or Chris Watson.

=== Young composers ===
Each year, young composers studying musical composition at university are also given the opportunity to have their work performed by the Symphony Orchestra and broadcast on RNZ Concert. The NZSO Todd Corporation Young Composers Award provides nine finalists with firsthand mentoring on orchestral composition and the chance to have their composition workshopped, rehearsed and performed by the full-size, professional orchestra. Each finalist is interviewed for a radio feature programme, with a judging panel deciding the award winner.

University of Otago student Sam van Betew won the competition in 2014, and said it was an honour to have "one of the world's best orchestras" performing his music. University of Auckland and New Zealand School of Music graduate Robin Toan was a finalist in 2008, and described it as one of the most valuable experiences a young composer can have.

In 2005, Robin Toan was also the first young composer to be selected as composer-in-residence for the National Youth Orchestra. The NYO and the NZSO Chamber Orchestra are two NZSO subsidiaries whose performances have been recorded for RNZ Concert and its forerunner stations.

=== Other groups ===
RNZ Concert regularly takes live broadcasts of Auckland Philharmonia Orchestra and Chamber Music New Zealand concerts, and records other ensembles widely across the country. New Zealand String Quartet concerts have featured on RNZ Concert, as well as being broadcast by Deutsche Welle, CBC Radio 2 and ABC Classic FM.

Performances by church and private school choirs are often featured, including those of Wellington's Cathedral of St Paul and Christchurch's St Andrews School. Auckland's Musica Sacra chamber choir has had several concerts recorded since 1998, and Wellington's Nota Bene chamber choir has had its concerts regularly recorded since 2004. Winners of the Royal Overseas League Arts International Scholarship for a New Zealand Chamber Ensemble also have their performances recorded for broadcast.

== Recorded music ==
=== Local artists ===
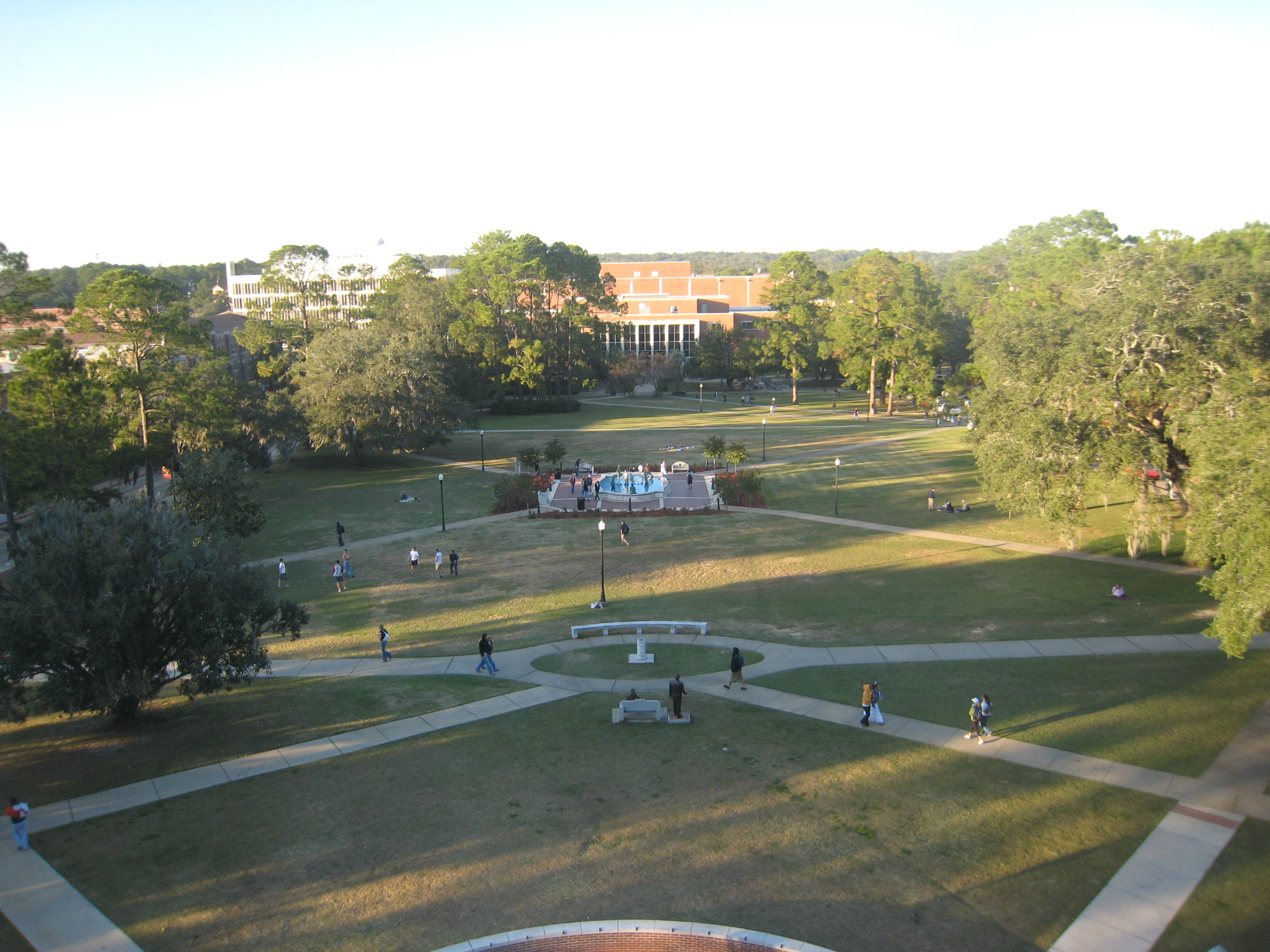
Featured New Zealand pianist Read Gainsford is based at Florida State University.

Over several decades RNZ Concert has recorded and broadcast many New Zealand compositions, and featured many local musicians. Its collected recordings, currently held by Ngā Taonga Sound and Vision national archives, have become a record of New Zealand's fine music history. Some of the only remaining audio recordings of composer Douglas Lilburn are two radio interviews and a recorded performance of him playing his own piece From the Port Hills.

Many New Zealand musicians and composers, like London-based Kiri te Kanawa and Florida State University's Reed Gainsford, have had their work recorded and broadcast by RNZ Concert while pursuing further musical study and career opportunities abroad in the United States, United Kingdom or Europe. Other artists have remained based in New Zealand, while having their work showcased by RNZ Concert and by fine music stations overseas. These include pianist and chamber soloist Katherine Austin, singer Judy Bellingham and organist Michael Stewart.

Composers and composing musicians such as Michael Williams, Phillip Brownlee, Yvette Audain, Nigel Keay and Ryan Youens have had their work featured on RNZ Concert, and several conductors including Martin Setchell have been involved in recordings. Singers Morag Atchison, Stephanie Acraman and Valerie Wycoff, violinists Amalia Hall and Natalie Sharonlin and pianists Charmaine Ford and Rachel Thomas have also performed their work.

=== International artists ===
International artists are regularly featured through the touring programmes of Chamber Music New Zealand, as well as soloists with the major orchestras. RNZ Concert also carries major coverage of the Michael Hill International Violin Competition every two years, both from Queenstown and Auckland.

== Broadcasting ==
RNZ Concert broadcasts in FM stereo via terrestrial transmitters located around New Zealand, as well as from the Koreasat 6 satellite. It is also available as web streaming, through the RNZ app, and on Freeview and Sky.

=== Stations ===
- Kaitaia - 100.3 FM
- Russell - 97.3 FM
- Kaikohe - 98.3 FM
- Whangārei - 100.4 FM
- Waipu/Lower Northland - 105.2 FM
- Auckland - 92.6 FM
- Hamilton - 91.4 FM
- Tauranga - 91.4 FM
- Whakatāne - 95.3 FM
- Rotorua - 90.3 FM
- Taupō - 98.4 FM
- Gisborne - 97.3 FM
- Napier - 91.1 FM
- New Plymouth - 91.6 FM
- Whanganui - 99.2 FM
- Palmerston North - 89.0 FM
- Masterton - 99.1 FM
- Kāpiti Coast - 98.3 FM
- Hutt Valley - 96.1 FM
- Wellington - 92.5 FM
- Nelson - 91.2 FM
- Blenheim - 99.3 FM
- Westport - 98.9 FM
- Greymouth/Hokitika - 95.5 FM
- Christchurch - 89.7 FM
- Akaroa - 95.1 FM
- Sumner - 99.7 FM
- Timaru - 99.5 FM
- Wānaka - 95.4 FM
- Queenstown - 98.4 FM
- Alexandra - 97.5 FM
- Dunedin - 92.6 / 99.0 FM
- Mosgiel - 99.4 FM
- Invercargill - 90.0 FM
