= Koreasat 6 =

South Korean satellite launched in 2010

- Mission type: Communications
- Operator: KT Corporation
- COSPAR ID: 2010-070B
- SATCAT no.: 37265
- Mission duration: 15 years

Spacecraft properties
- Manufacturer: KT, Thales Group

Start of mission
- Launch date: December 29, 2010
- Rocket: Ariane 5
- Launch site: Guiana Space Centre

End of mission
- Disposal: Decommissioned
- Deactivated: December 16, 2005

Orbital parameters
- Reference system: Geocentric
- Regime: Geostationary
- Longitude: 160° E
- Period: 1,438.0 minutes
- Epoch: August 5, 1995

Koreasat 6 is a South Korean communications satellite operated by Koreasat. Koreasat 6 is the second satellite launched by operator KT (Korea Telecom) Corporation which weighed about 2750 kg (6060 lb) at the launching time. This satellite orbital position at 116 degrees East was changed to 160 degrees East in 2025 when contracted by Optus to provide broadcasting services to Sky (New Zealand). The new Koreasat 6A launched in 2024 replacing Koreasat 6 in its old orbital position of 116 degrees East.
