= Christianity in New Zealand =

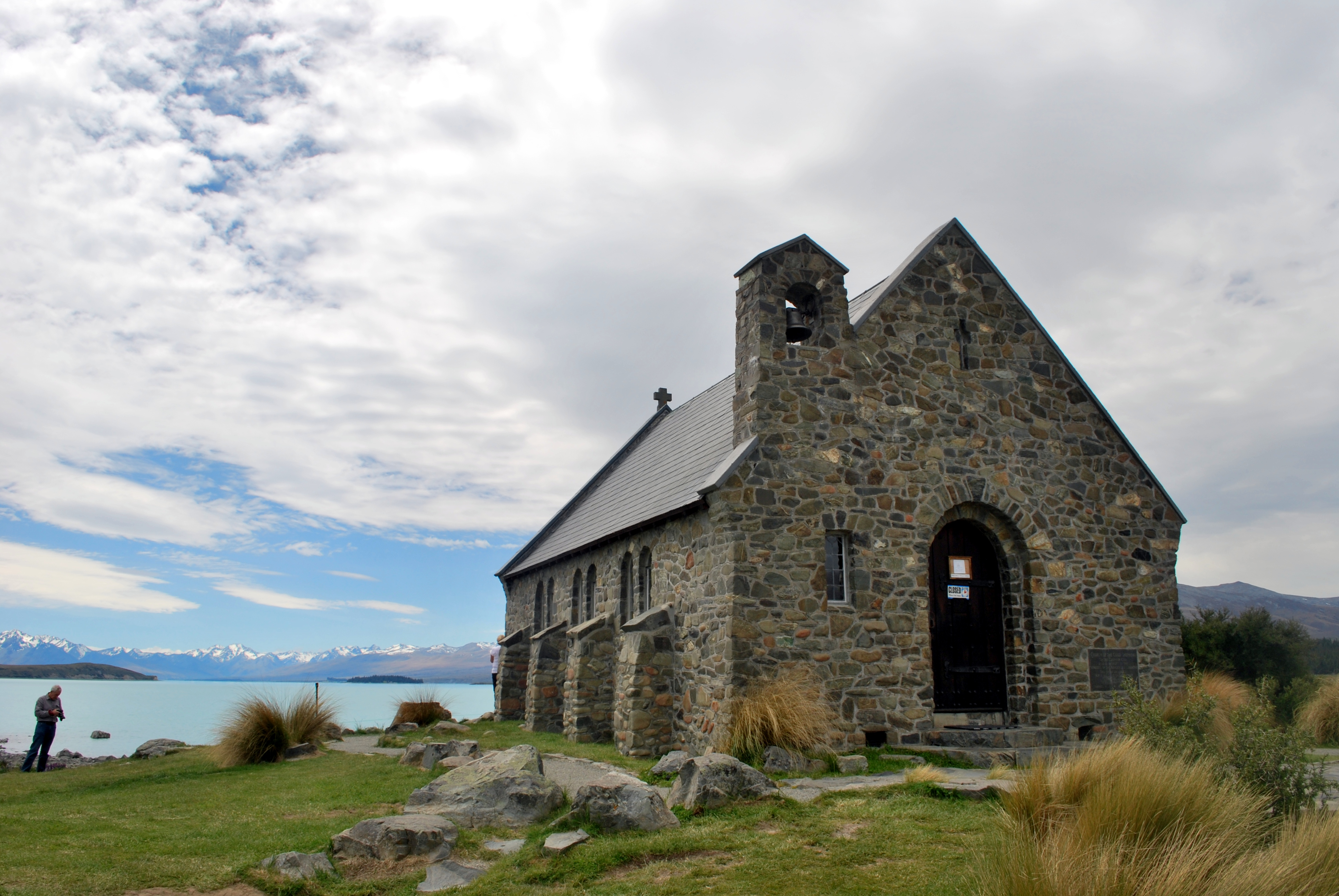
The Church of the Good Shepherd on the shore of Lake Tekapo. The stone church was built as a memorial to the pioneers of the Mackenzie region.

Christianity in New Zealand dates to the arrival of missionaries from the Church Missionary Society who were welcomed onto the beach at Rangihoua Bay in December 1814. Christianity soon became the predominant belief amongst the indigenous people, with over half of Māori regularly attending church services within the first 30 years. It remains New Zealand's largest religious group, but no one denomination is dominant and there is no official state church. According to the 2023 census 33.2% of the population identified as Christian. The largest Christian denominations are Catholic, Anglican, and Presbyterian. Christian organisations are the leading non-government providers of social services in New Zealand.

== History ==
The first Christian service conducted in New Zealand waters was most likely carried out by Father Paul-Antoine Léonard de Villefeix, the Dominican chaplain on the ship Saint Jean Baptiste commanded by the French navigator and explorer Jean-François-Marie de Surville. Villefeix was the first Christian minister to set foot in New Zealand, and probably said Mass on board the ship near Whatuwhiwhi in Doubtless Bay on Christmas Day in 1769. He is reported to have also led prayers for the sick the previous day and to have conducted Christian burials.

New Zealand's religious history after the arrival of Europeans saw substantial missionary activity, with Māori generally converting to Christianity voluntarily (compare forced conversions elsewhere in the world). The Anglican Church Missionary Society (CMS) sent missionaries to settle in New Zealand. Samuel Marsden of the Church Missionary Society (chaplain in New South Wales) officiated at its first service on Christmas Day in 1814, at Oihi Bay, a small cove in Rangihoua Bay in the Bay of Islands, at the invitation of chiefs Te Pahi and Ruatara, considered to have been the first preaching of the gospel in New Zealand. The CMS founded its first mission at Rangihoua Bay in the Bay of Islands in 1814 and over the next decade established farms and schools in the area. In June 1823 Wesleydale, the first Wesleyan Methodist mission in New Zealand, was established at Kaeo, near Whangaroa Harbour.

The first book published in the Māori language was A Korao no New Zealand; or, the New Zealander's First Book, published by CMS missioner Thomas Kendall in 1815. In 1817 Tītore and Tui (also known as Tuhi or Tupaea (1797?–1824)) sailed to England. They visited Professor Samuel Lee at Cambridge University and assisted him in the preparation of a grammar and vocabulary of Māori. Kendall travelled to London in 1820 with Hongi Hika and Waikato (a lower ranking Ngāpuhi chief) during which time work was done with Professor Samuel Lee, which resulted in the First Grammar and Vocabulary of the New Zealand Language (1820).

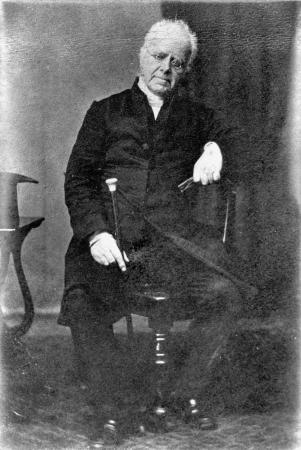
Henry Williams was the leader of the CMS mission in New Zealand in the first half of the 19th century.

In 1823, Rev Henry Williams became the leader of the CMS mission in New Zealand. He settled at Paihia, across the bay from Kororāreka (nowadays Russell); then described as "the hell-hole of the South Pacific" because of the abuse of alcohol and prostitution that was the consequence of the sealing ships and whaling ships that visited Kororāreka. Williams concentrated on the salvation of souls. The first baptism occurred in 1825, although it was another 5 years before the second baptism. Schools were established, which addressed religious instruction, reading and writing and practical skills. Williams also stopped the CMS trading muskets for food. Māori eventually came to see that the ban on muskets was the only way to bring an end to the tribal wars.

Williams organised the CMS missionaries into a systematic study of the Māori language and soon started translating the Bible into Māori. In July 1827 William Colenso printed the first Māori Bible, comprising three chapters of Genesis, the 20th chapter of Exodus, the first chapter of the Gospel of St John, 30 verses of the fifth chapter of the Gospel of St Matthew, the Lord's Prayer and some hymns. It was the first book printed in New Zealand and his 1837 Māori New Testament was the first indigenous language translation of the Bible published in the southern hemisphere. Demand for the Māori New Testament, and for the Prayer Book that followed, grew exponentially, as did Christian Māori leadership and public Christian services, with 33,000 Māori soon attending regularly. Literacy and understanding the Bible increased mana and social and economic benefits, decreased the practices of slavery and intertribal violence, and increased peace and respect for all people in Māori society, including women.

Henry Williams played an important role in the translation of the Treaty of Waitangi in 1840. In August 1839 Captain William Hobson was given instructions by the Colonial Office to take the constitutional steps needed to establish a British colony in New Zealand. Hobson was sworn in as Lieutenant-Governor in Sydney on 14 January, finally arriving in the Bay of Islands on 29 January 1840. The Colonial Office did not provide Hobson with a draft treaty, so he was forced to write his own treaty with the help of his secretary, James Freeman, and British Resident James Busby. The entire treaty was prepared in four days. Realising that a treaty in English could be neither understood, debated or agreed to by Māori, Hobson instructed Williams, who worked with his son Edward, who was also proficient in the Māori language, to translate the document into Māori and this was done overnight on 4 February. Williams was also involved in explaining the treaty to Māori leaders, firstly at the meetings with William Hobson at Waitangi, but later also when he travelled to Port Nicholson, Queen Charlotte's Sound, Kapiti, Waikanae and Otaki to persuade Māori chiefs to sign the treaty.

In 1845, 64,000 Māori were attending church services, over half of the estimated population of 110,000. By then, there was probably a higher proportion of Māori attending Church in New Zealand than British people in the United Kingdom. The New Zealand Anglican Church, te Hāhi Mihinare (the missionary church), was, and is, the largest Māori denomination. Māori made Christianity their own and spread it throughout the country often before European missionaries arrived. As the New Zealand settler population grew and the Māori population declined relative to it most denominations focused efforts on the settler population. Several Māori Christian movements were formed such as Ringatu and Ratana. Mormon missionaries focused on converting Māori who were discontent with Christianity.

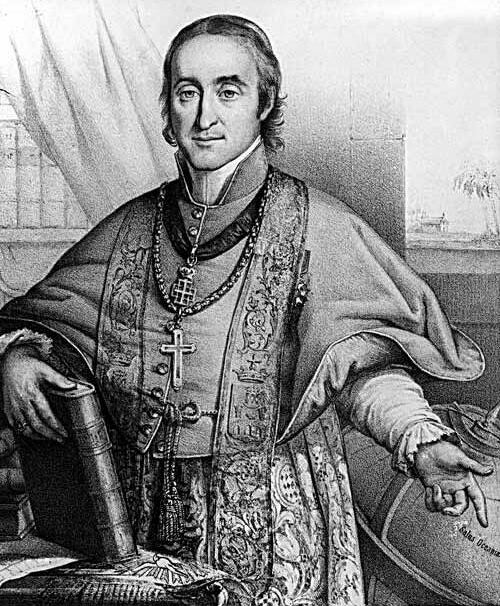
Jean-Baptiste Pompallier, the first Roman Catholic bishop in the country

Jean Baptiste Pompallier was the first Catholic bishop to come to New Zealand, arriving in 1838. With a number of Marist Brothers, Pompallier organised the Catholic Church throughout the country. George Augustus Selwyn became the first Anglican Bishop of New Zealand in 1841. Selwyn was criticised by the CMS for being ineffective in training and ordaining New Zealand teachers, deacons and priests—especially Māori. It would be 11 years until the first Māori deacon, Rota Waitoa, would be ordained by the Bishop at St Paul's, Auckland, and 24 years before he ordained a Māori priest. The first Māori bishop in New Zealand's history was Frederick Bennett, who was consecrated Anglican Bishop of Aotearoa, in 1928. The first Catholic Māori priest, Father Wiremu Te Āwhitu was ordained in 1944, and the first Māori bishop, Bishop Max Mariu was ordained in 1988.

The Sisters of Mercy arrived in Auckland in 1850 and were the first order of religious sisters to come to New Zealand and began to work in health care and education. At the direction of Mary MacKillop (St Mary of the Cross), the Sisters of St Joseph of the Sacred Heart arrived in New Zealand and established schools. In 1892, Suzanne Aubert established the Sisters of Compassion—the first Catholic order established in New Zealand for women. The Anglican Church in New Zealand recognises her as a saintly person and in 1997 the New Zealand Catholic Bishops' Conference agreed to support the "Introduction of the Cause of Suzanne Aubert", to begin the process of consideration for her canonisation as a saint by the Catholic Church.

Mainline Protestant churches in New Zealand were more theologically conservative than the home denominations. The earliest liberal schism was Samuel Edger's non-denominational Lore Street Hall congregation. Edger was the chaplain for the Albertland settlement scheme but abandoned it and moved to Auckland where he split from Baptist and Congregationalist groups. Former Anglican minister James O'Bryen Dott Hoare founded a liberal and humanist church in 1894 in Christchurch. Schisms were rare, with notable examples being Presbyterian minister James Chapple leaving for the Unitarian Church.

The Third Great Awakening in the United States spread to New Zealand through travelling Evangelical pastors. Revivalism influenced many Protestant denominations, such as Methodism with the Primitive Methodists. The Salvation Army was formed in the background of this Evangelical revival and Brethren, Church of Christ, and the Seventh-day Adventists were all heavily influenced by the low church style of preaching. This Evangelical revival not occur simultaneously through out the country but spread in different places at different times often due to the influence of one man, such as Gordon Forlong in the Manawatu in 1880.

In 1892 the New Zealand Church Missionary Society (NZCMS) formed in a Nelson church hall and the first New Zealand missionaries were sent overseas soon after.

Although there was some hostility between Catholic and Protestants in the 19th and early 20th centuries, this declined towards the end of the 20th century.

== Demographics ==
The dominant religious affiliation in each territorial authority (based on 2023 census)

The proportion of New Zealanders who identify as Christian is declining—accounting for around a third of responses to the 2023 census, whereas in the 1991 census it stood at around three-quarters.

Protestant (& Protestant affiliations) was the largest Christian religious affiliation in New Zealand, according to the 2023 census, followed by Catholic (& Catholic affiliations), then Christian (not further defined). Roman Catholic was the largest single denomination, followed by Anglican, then Presbyterian.

Denominational affiliation	2018		2013		2006		2001		Trend (%)
Denominational affiliation	Number	%	Number	%	Number	%	Number	%	2001–13
Total Christian	1,793,970	38.17	1,858,977	47.65	2,027,418	54.16	2,043,843	58.92	▼ -11.27
Christian (not further defined)	310,143	6.6	216,177	5.54	186,234	4.97	192,165	5.54	▲
Protestant (& Protestant affiliations)	846,000	17.43	1,093,065	28.01	1,286,196	34.35	1,324,353	38.17	▼
Anglican	314,913	6.70	459,771	11.79	554,925	14.82	584,793	16.86	▼
Presbyterian, Congregational and Reformed	244,701	5.20	330,516	8.47	400,839	10.71	431,139	12.43	▼
Methodist	72,183	1.5	102,879	2.64	121,806	3.25	120,546	3.48	▼
Evangelical, Born Again and Fundamentalist	65,283	1.38	15,381	0.39	13,836	0.37	11,016	0.32	Steady
Pentecostal	53,874	0.67	74,256	1.90	79,155	2.11	67,182	1.94	Steady
Adventist	18,510	0.39	17,085	0.44	16,191	0.43	14,868	0.43	Steady
Baptist	38,043	0.8	54,345	1.39	56,913	1.52	51,423	1.48	▼
Brethren	14,160	0.30	18,624	0.48	19,617	0.52	20,397	0.59	▼
Protestant (not further defined) & non denominational	9561	0.20	4,998	0.13	3,954	0.11	2,787	0.08	▲
Salvation Army	7929	0.16	9,162	0.23	11,493	0.31	12,618	0.36	▼
Asian Christian	5101	0.2	132	<0.01	195	0.01	195	0.01	Steady
Uniting/Union Church and Ecumenical	3693	0.07	999	0.03	1,419	0.04	1,389	0.04	Steady
Lutheran	3585	0.07	3,903	0.10	4,476	0.12	4,314	0.12	Steady
Church of Christ and Associated Churches of Christ	3258	0.06	2,145	0.05	2,991	0.08	3,270	0.09	Steady
Total Māori Christian	56,157	1.19	54,180	1.36	65,550	1.75	63,597	1.83	▼ -0.47
Rātana	43,821	0.93	40,353	1.03	50,565	1.35	48,975	1.41	▼
Ringatū	12,336	0.26	13,272	0.34	16,419	0.44	15,291	0.44	▼
Māori Christian (not further defined)			222	0.01	219	0.01	237	0.01	Steady
Other Māori Christian			333	0.01	360	0.01	426	0.01	Steady
Catholic (& Catholic affiliations)	473,145	10.02	492,105	12.61	508,437	13.58	485,637	14.00	▼
Orthodox (& Orthodox affiliations)	15,450	0.29	13,806	0.35	13,194	0.35	9,576	0.28	▲
Other Christian affiliations	82,978	1.83	63,504	1.53	66,861	1.79	62,886	1.81	
Latter-day Saints	54,123	1.15	40,728	1.04	43,539	1.16	39,915	1.15	▼
Jehovah's Witnesses	20,061	0.42	17,931	0.46	17,910	0.48	17,829	0.51	▼
Other Christian	-	-	3,714	0.10	3,798	0.10	3,558	0.10	Steady
Total population	4,699,755		4,242,048		4,027,947		3,737,277		

(Note: All figures are for the census usually resident population.
Percentages are based on number of responses rather than total population. These are nominal.
The 2011 census was cancelled due to the 2011 Christchurch earthquake
In all censuses, up to four responses were collected.)

=== Geographic distribution ===
The number of Christians in New Zealand varies slightly across different parts of the country—as of the 2006 census, the number of Christians in each territorial authority ranged from a low of 43.7% (in Kawerau) to a high of 63.4% (in Ashburton). In general, the tendency is for rural areas, particularly in the lower South Island, to have somewhat higher numbers of Christians, and urban areas to have lower numbers—of the sixteen designated Cities of New Zealand, fifteen have a smaller proportion of Christians than the country as a whole (the exception being Invercargill). The average proportion of Christians in the sixteen cities is 50.2%.

== Denominations and organisations ==
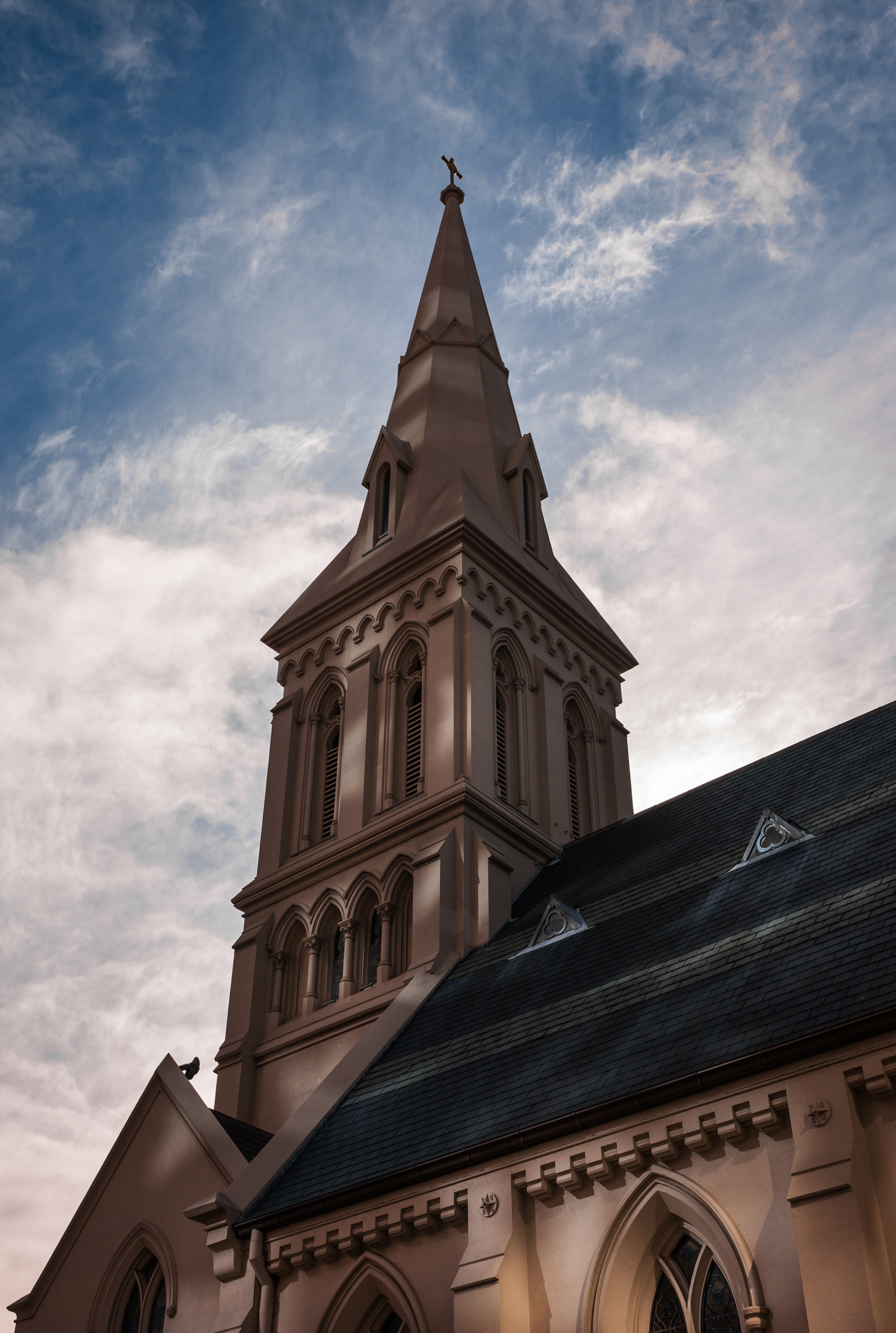
St. Patrick's (Catholic) Cathedral in Auckland

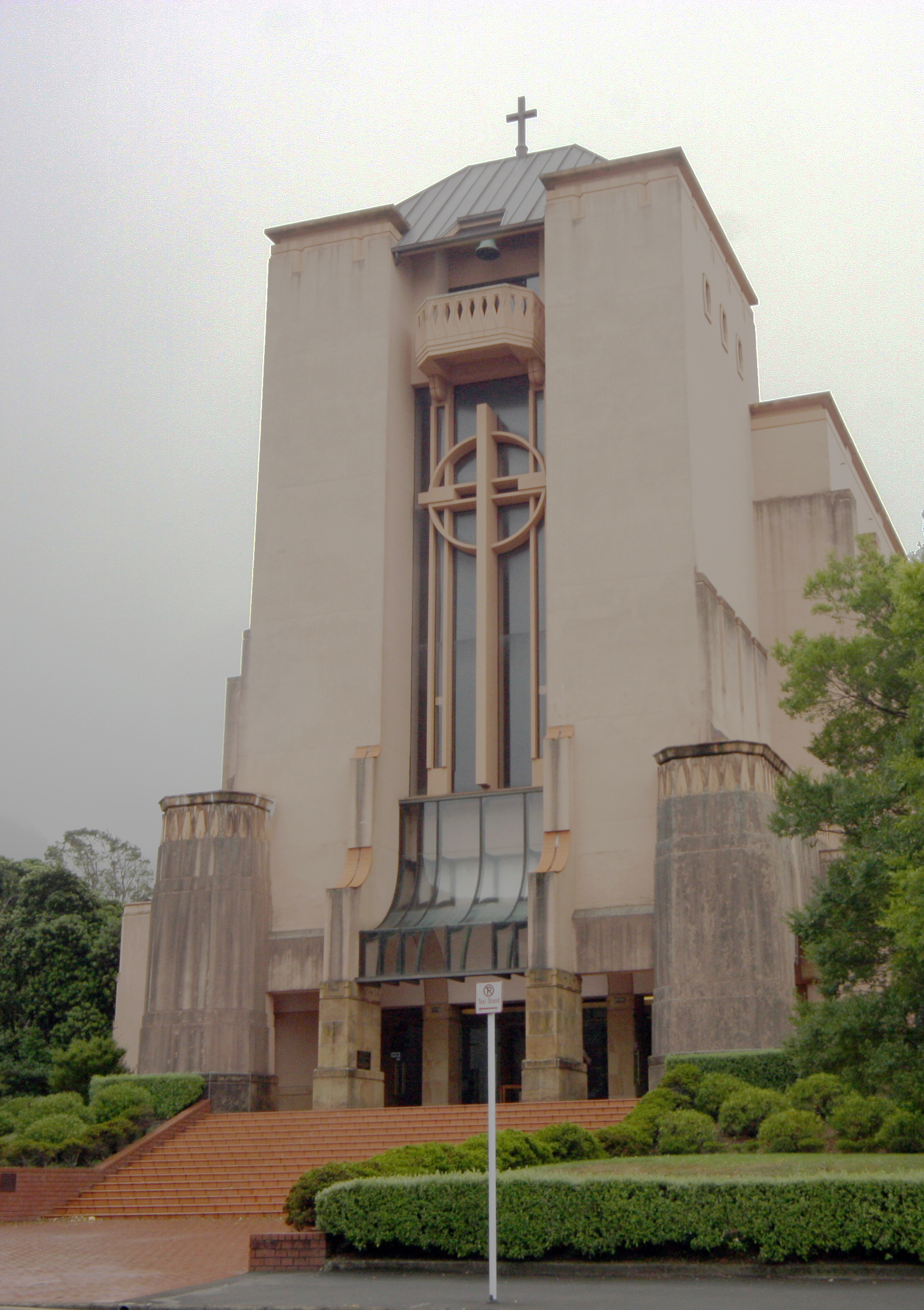
St Paul's (Anglican) Cathedral in Wellington

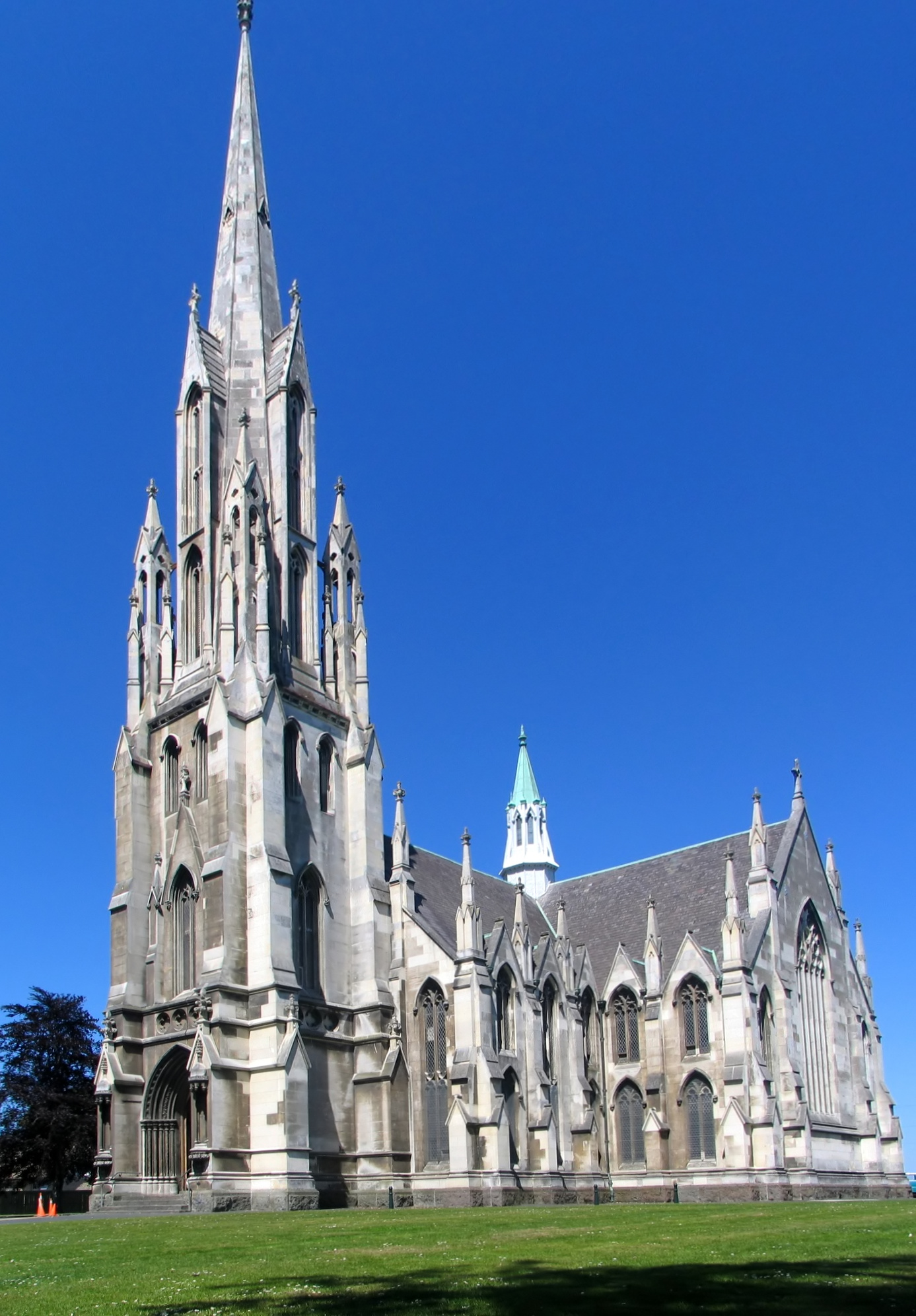
First Church of Otago (Presbyterian) in Dunedin

Catholicism, associated mostly with New Zealanders of Irish descent, is the most evenly distributed of the three main denominations, although it still has noticeable strengths in south and central Taranaki, on the West Coast, and in Kaikōura. It is also the largest denomination in Auckland and Wellington, although not by a great extent. The territorial authorities with the highest proportion of Catholics are Kaikōura (where they are 18.4% of the total population), Westland (18.3%), and Grey (17.8%). The territorial authorities with the lowest proportion of Catholics are Tasman (8.1%), Clutha (8.7%), and Western Bay of Plenty (8.7%).

Anglicanism, associated mostly with New Zealanders of English descent, is common in most parts of the country, but is strongest in Canterbury (the city of Christchurch having been founded as an Anglican settlement) and on the North Island's East Coast. It is the largest denomination in most parts of rural New Zealand, the main exception being the lower South Island. The territorial authorities with the highest proportion of Anglicans are Gisborne (where they are 27.4% of the total population), Wairoa (27.1%), and Hurunui (24.9%). The territorial authorities with the lowest proportion of Anglicans are Invercargill (7.7%), Manukau (8.3%), and Clutha (8.5%).

Presbyterianism, associated mostly with New Zealanders of Scottish descent, is strong in the lower South Island - the city of Dunedin was founded as a Presbyterian settlement, and many of the early settlers in the region were Scottish Presbyterians. Elsewhere, Presbyterians are usually outnumbered by both Anglicans and Catholics, making Presbyterianism the most geographically concentrated of the three main denominations. The territorial authorities with the highest proportion of Presbyterians are Gore (where they are 30.9% of the total population), Clutha (30.7%), and Southland (29.8%). The territorial authorities with the lowest proportion of Presbyterians are Far North (4.4%), Kaipara (6.2%), and Wellington (6.7%).

Pentecostalism and non-denominational churches are amongst the largest denominations according to the 2018 census. Examples of these churches are Life Church in Auckland, Curate Church in Mount Maunganui, Arise in Wellington and Harmony Church in Christchurch.

Christian organisations in New Zealand are heavily involved in community activities including education; health services; chaplaincy to prisons, rest homes and hospitals; social justice and human rights advocacy. Approximately 11% of New Zealand students attend Catholic schools; the Anglican Church administers a number of schools; and schools administered by members of the New Zealand Association for Christian Schools educated 13,000 students in 2009.

Many Non-Conformists saw New Zealand as an opportunity for a Utopian settlement. A large Non-Conformist settlement scheme was the Albertland scheme, which saw around 3,000 Non-Conformists migrate to New Zealand. In most of the country however small populations in rural areas led to the merging of Baptist, Congregationalist, and Church of Christ denominations.

The first Unitarian Church was built in 1898, the Auckland Unitarian Church is still active to this day.

Quakers were present in Nelson early on but only established a few churches and were far less prevalent in New Zealand than elsewhere.

== Culture and the arts ==
=== Architecture ===
The architectural landscape of New Zealand has been affected by Christianity and the prominence of churches in cities, towns and the countryside attests to its historical importance in New Zealand. Notable Cathedrals include the Anglican Holy Trinity Cathedral, Auckland, ChristChurch Cathedral, Christchurch and Saint Paul's Cathedral, Wellington and the Catholic St Patrick's Cathedral, Auckland, Sacred Heart Cathedral, Wellington, Cathedral of the Blessed Sacrament, Christchurch, St. Joseph's Cathedral, Dunedin.

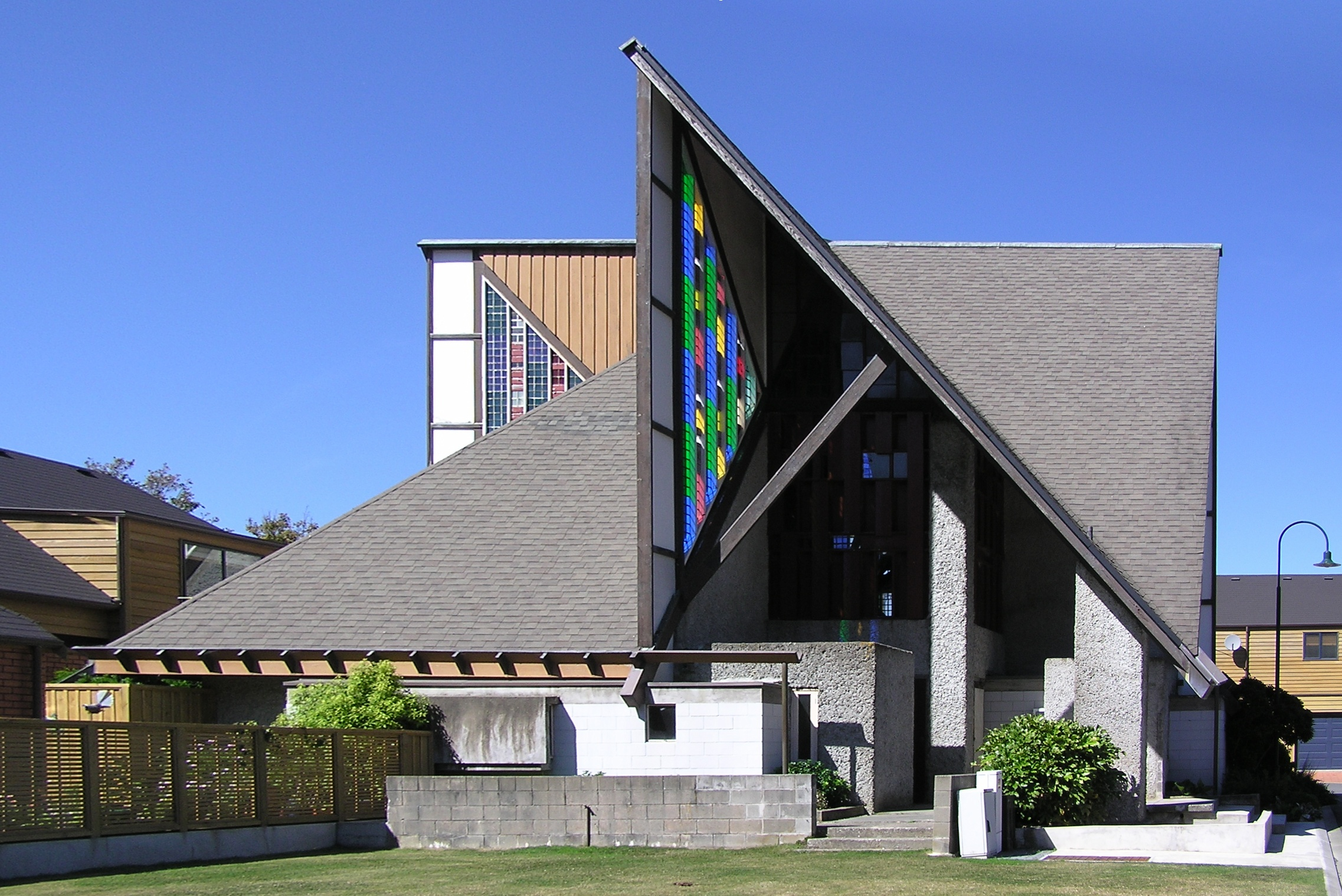
Modernist Futuna Chapel in Wellington

The Gothic Revival façade of Saint Joseph's Cathedral in Dunedin

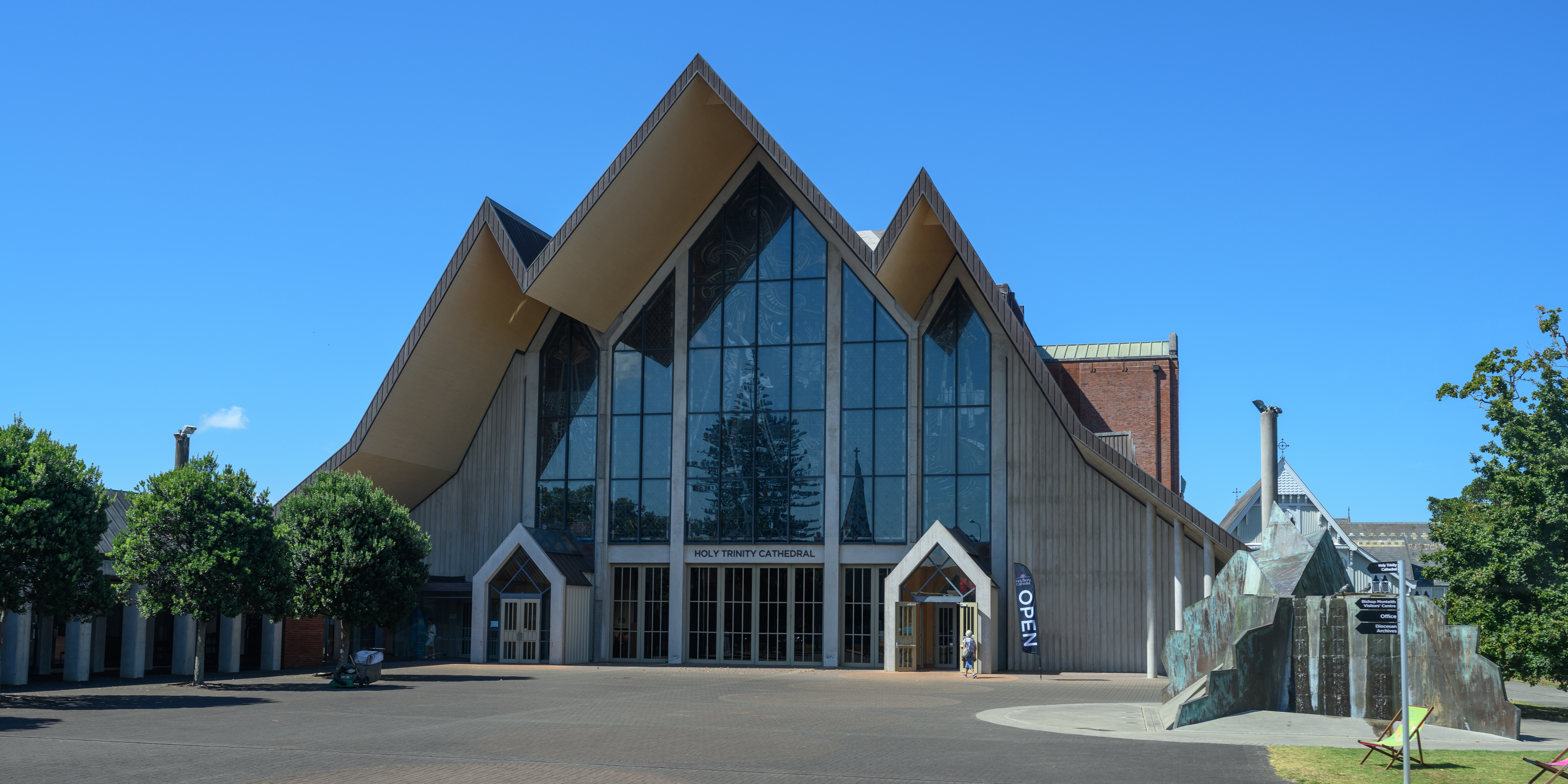
Holy Trinity Cathedral in Parnell, Auckland

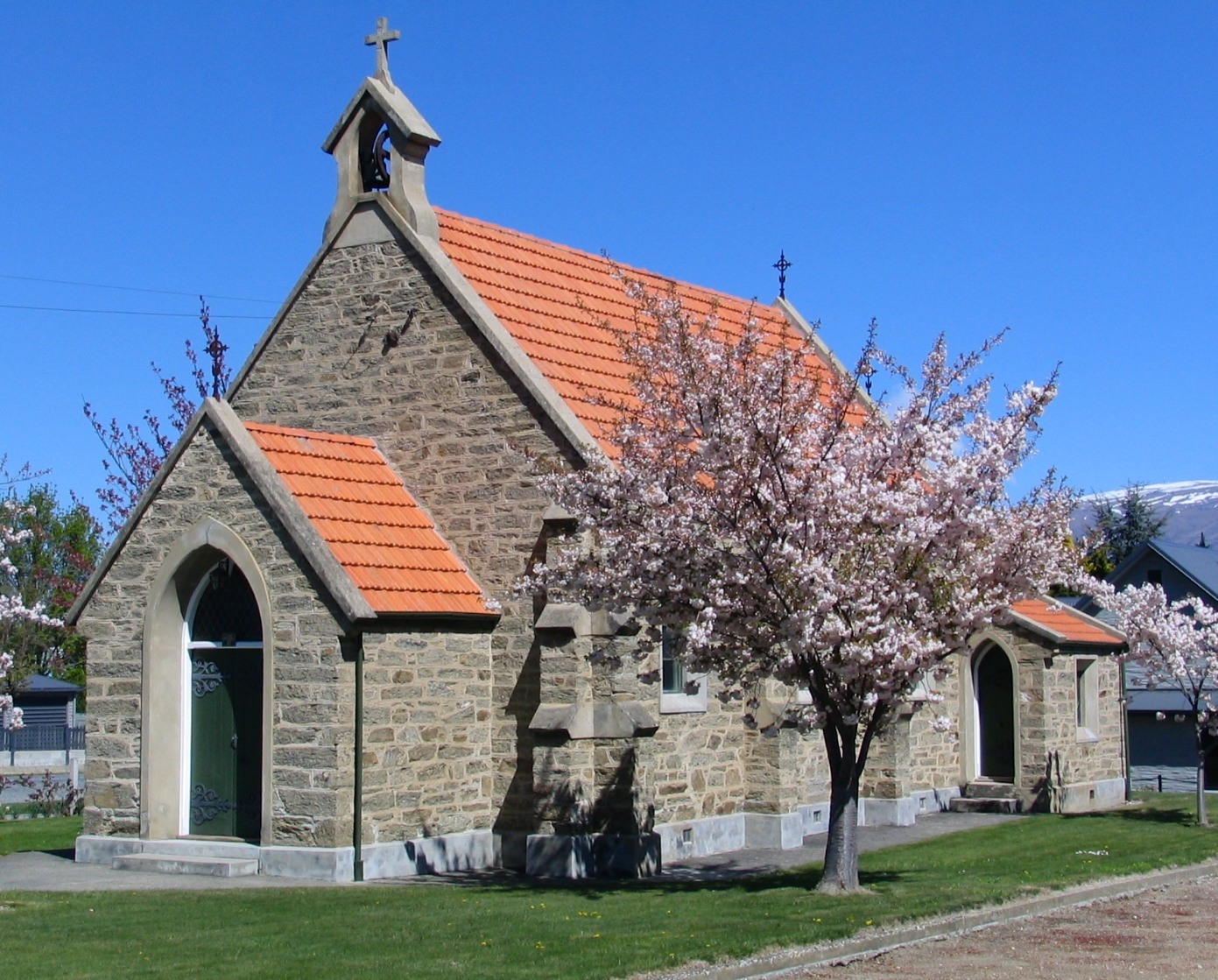
Saint Dunstan's Church, a listed building in Clyde, Central Otago

=== Holidays ===
The Christian festivals of Christmas and Easter are marked by public holidays in New Zealand. Christmas Day, 25 December, falls during the Southern Hemisphere Summer allowing open air carolling and barbecues in the sun. Nevertheless, various Northern hemisphere traditions have continued in New Zealand—including roast dinners and Christmas trees, with the pōhutukawa regarded as New Zealand's iconic Christmas tree.

=== Music ===
Christian and Māori choral traditions have been blended in New Zealand to produce a distinct contribution to Christian music, including the popular hymns Whakaria Mai and Tama Ngakau Marie.

==== Christian music festivals ====
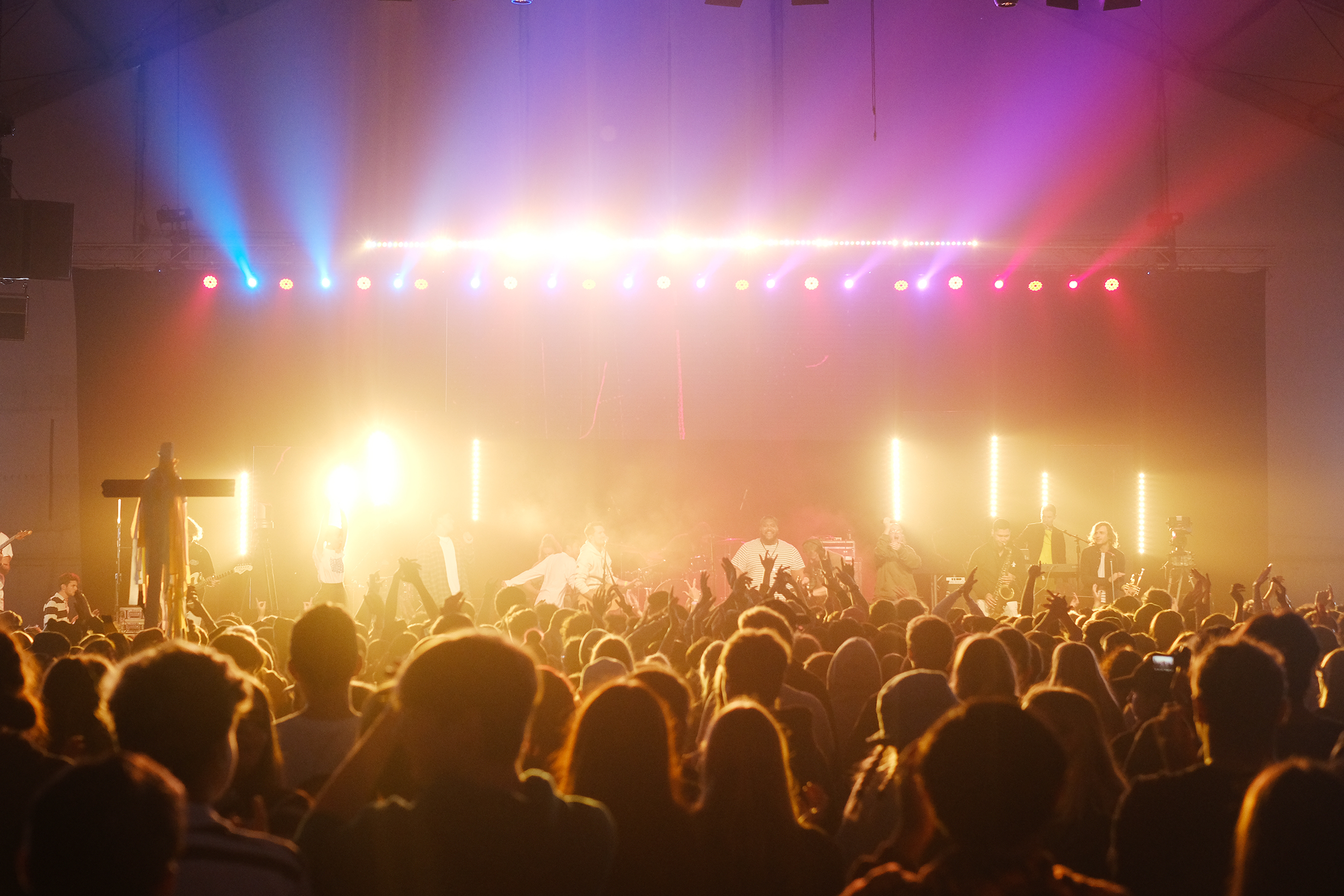
Eastercamp, South Island. A Christian event attended by 3500 youths from 50+ youth groups and churches in South Island. Held annually in Spencer Park, Christchurch.

New Zealand once hosted the largest Christian music festival in the Southern Hemisphere, Parachute Music Festival, however in 2014, the music festival was cancelled due to financial difficulties. Large Christian Easter events still occur. Eastercamp, a Christian youth event in South Island, draws 3500 youths from over 50 youth groups and churches.

=== Media ===
New Zealand has many media organisations and personalities. Frank Ritchie, is a New Zealand radio broadcaster, Media Chaplain, and ordained Christian Minister who is a Sunday evening radio host on Newstalk ZB.

Rhema Media is a Christian media organisation in New Zealand. It owns radio networks Rhema, Life FM and Star, and television station Shine TV.

== Politics ==
Christianity has never had official status as a national religion in New Zealand, and a poll in 2007 found 58% of people were opposed to official status being granted. Despite this, each sitting day of the New Zealand Parliament opens with a Christian prayer. In contrast to England, where the Anglican Church is the officially established church, in New Zealand the Anglican Church has no special status, although it often officiates at civic events such as Anzac Day.

Most New Zealanders consider politicians' religious beliefs to be a private matter. Many New Zealand prime ministers have been professing Christians, including Jim Bolger, David Lange, Robert Muldoon, Walter Nash, Keith Holyoake, Michael Joseph Savage and Christopher Luxon. Prime ministers Helen Clark, John Key and Jacinda Ardern identified as agnostic during their time in office.

Christian political parties have never gained significant support and have often been characterised by controversy. Many of these are now defunct, such as the Christian Democrat Party, the Christian Heritage Party (which collapsed after leader Graham Capill was convicted as a child sex offender), Destiny New Zealand, The Family Party, and the New Zealand Pacific Party (whose leader Taito Phillip Field was convicted on bribery and corruption charges). The Exclusive Brethren gained public notoriety during the 2005 election for distributing anti-Labour pamphlets, which former National Party leader Don Brash later admitted to knowledge of.

The two main political parties, Labour and National, are not affiliated with any religion, although religious groups have at times played a significant role (e.g. the Rātana movement and Labour). Politicians are often involved in public dialogue with religious groups.

== See also ==
- National Statement on Religious Diversity
- Religion in New Zealand
- Christmas in New Zealand
