= CHJJ-FM =

Radio station in Cobourg, Ontario

Coordinates: 43°58′31.08″N 78°11′51.00″W

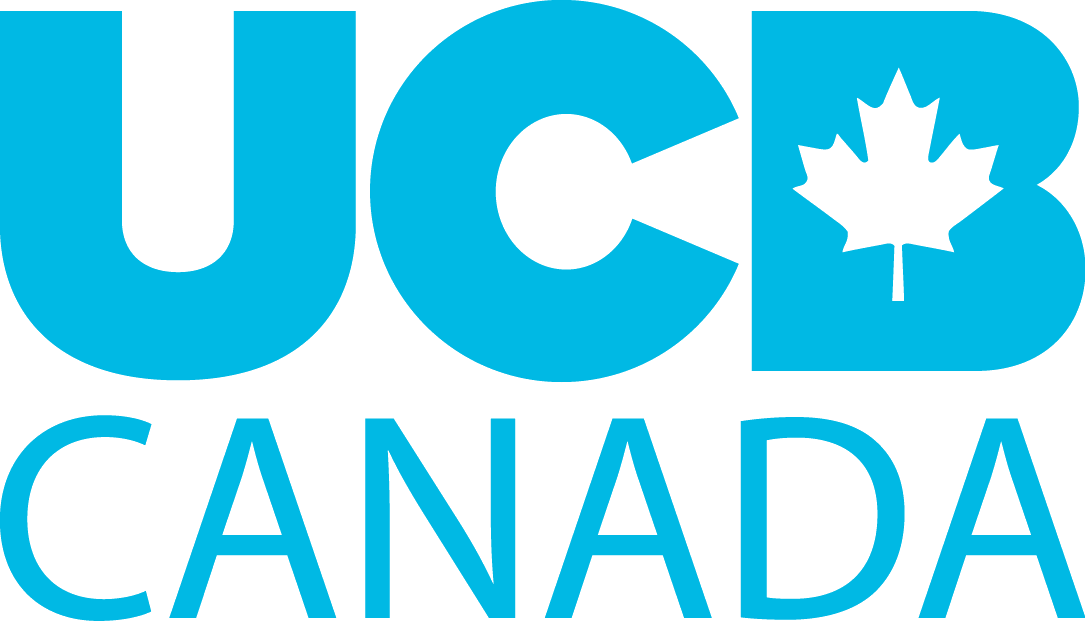
- Cobourg, Ontario; Canada
- Frequency: 90.7 MHz
- Branding: UCB Canada

Programming
- Format: Contemporary Christian music

Ownership
- Owner: United Christian Broadcasters Canada
- Sister stations: CKGW-FM, CKJJ-FM

History
- Founded: 2007, as a rebroadcaster on 100.9 MHz
- First air date: September 8, 2012
- Former call signs: CKJJ-FM-1 (2007–2012)

Technical information
- ERP: 250 watts
- HAAT: 32.5 metres (107 ft)

Links
- Website: ucbradio.com

CHJJ-FM (90.7 MHz) is a listener-supported non-commercial station in Cobourg, Ontario. It broadcasts a contemporary Christian music format and is owned by United Christian Broadcasters of Canada (UCB). Most programming is simulcast with co-owned 102.3 CKJJ-FM Belleville.

== History ==
In 2007, the station originally began operating as a rebroadcaster of CKJJ-FM Belleville, Ontario. The new Cobourg station was on 100.9 FM with 42 watts of power, using the call sign CKJJ-FM-1.

On January 26, 2010, UCB was denied a licence by the Canadian Radio-television and Telecommunications Commission to change CKJJ-FM-1's frequency to 90.7 MHz. They would apply for it again on September 27, 2010, this time receiving approval on February 21, 2011, after the original repeater was forced to close down following the launch of CIYM-FM 100.9 in Brighton.

CHJJ-FM began on-air tests at 90.7 FM in December 2011 and officially launched on September 8, 2012.
