= CJLT-FM =

Radio station in Medicine Hat, Alberta

Coordinates: 50°02′46″N 110°37′11″W

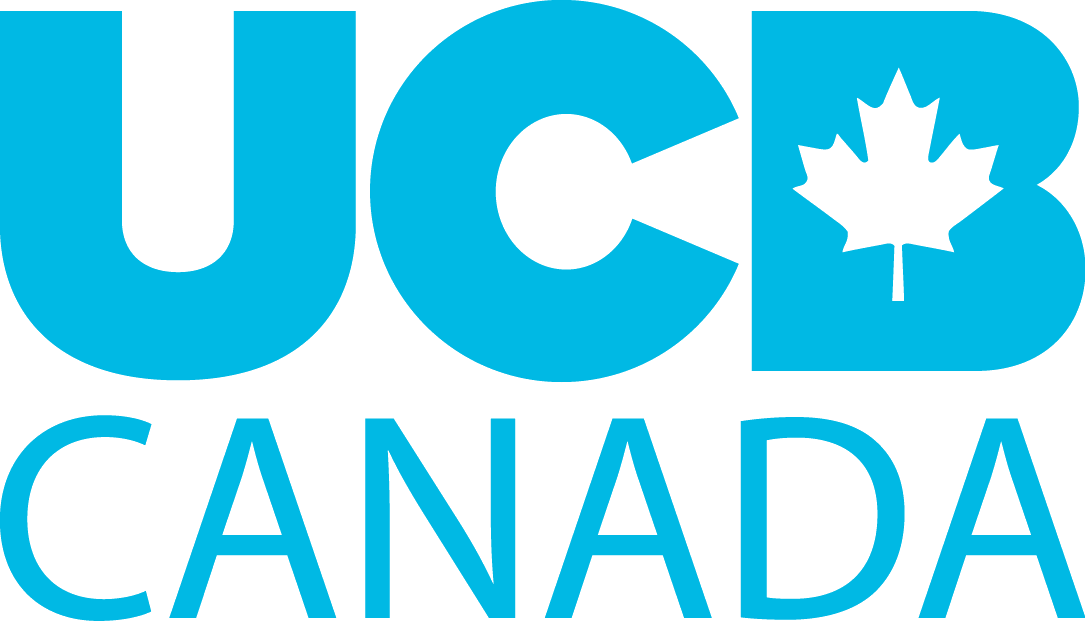
- Medicine Hat, Alberta; Canada
- Frequency: 93.7 MHz
- Branding: UCB 93.7 Medicine Hat

Programming
- Format: Christian

Ownership
- Owner: United Christian Broadcasters Media Canada

History
- First air date: 2003
- Call sign meaning: Christ Jesus Loves Thee

Technical information
- Class: B
- ERP: 2.3 kW horizontal polarization only
- HAAT: 99.5 metres (326 ft)

Links
- Website: ucbmedia.org/media/

CJLT-FM is a Canadian radio station broadcasting at 93.7 FM in Medicine Hat, Alberta. Owned by United Christian Broadcasters Canada, it broadcasts a Christian format.

== History ==
The station originally began broadcasting in 2003 as an LPFM on 99.5 FM, then in 2007 received CRTC approval to move to operate as a high powered station at 93.7 FM. On April 5, 2011, the station applied to the CRTC to change CJLT-FM's frequency from 93.7 MHz to 103.3 MHz, as well as increase their power to 58,000 watts; furthermore, they also requested to rescind their "specialty format" status, which would enable them to switch to a soft adult contemporary format. However, the CRTC rejected the proposal, citing that allowing the change would have an undue impact on the revenue of other commercial stations in the market, and reduce the diversity of content.

On October 4, 2012, it was announced that Vista Radio had acquired 93.7 FM from Lighthouse Broadcasting Ltd. On October 15, 2012, at 7 a.m, Vista Radio re-launched Power 93.7 as 93.7 Praise FM, with Jeff Michaels & Warren Affleck on Mornings, Beth Warden on "Today's Family" middays, and Warren Osmond on Afternoon drive.

In December 2017, the CRTC again denied an application by Vista Radio to remove the conditions requiring CJLT to broadcast Christian music (with an intent to flip the station to an indie pop format), under most of the same objections as the previous attempt. Operating at a loss, Vista reached an agreement to sell the station to United Christian Broadcasters Media Canada (UCBMC), a sale approved by the CRTC in December 2023. This gave UCB its second station in Alberta, behind Fort McMurray's CKOS-FM.
