= CKOS =

CKOS may refer to:

- CKOS-FM, a radio station (91.1 FM) licensed to Fort McMurray, Alberta, Canada
- CKOS-TV, a defunct television station (channel 5) formerly licensed to Yorkton, Saskatchewan, Canada, now repeater CBKT-6
