= CKJJ-FM =

Christian radio station in Belleville, Ontario

Coordinates: 44°18′45″N 77°12′24″W

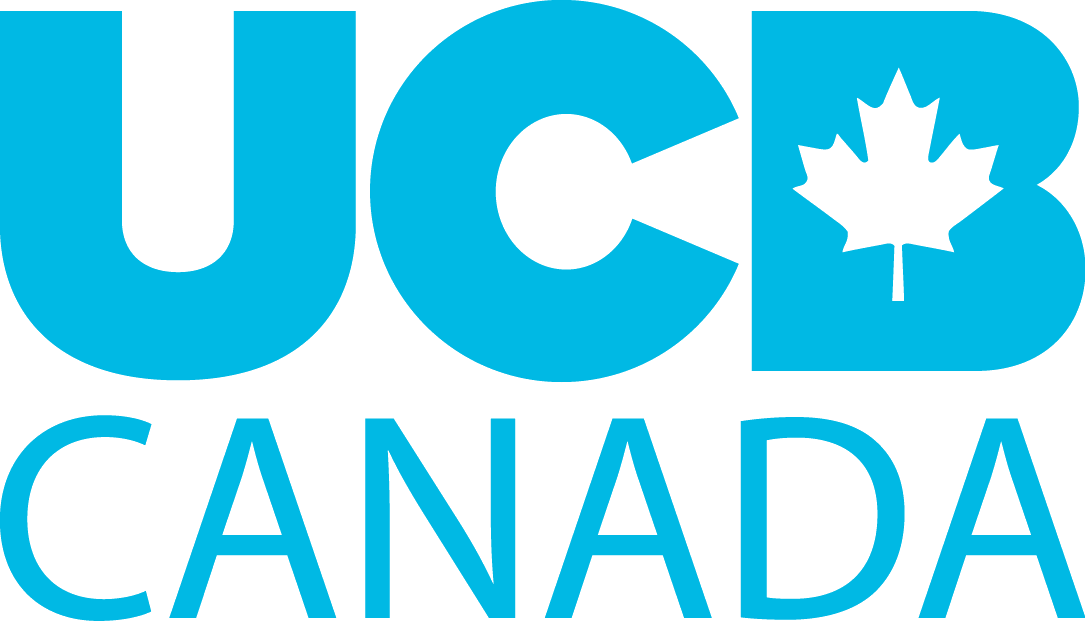
- Belleville, Ontario; Canada
- Frequency: 102.3 MHz
- Branding: UCB Canada

Programming
- Format: Contemporary Christian music

Ownership
- Owner: United Christian Broadcasters Canada
- Sister stations: CKGW-FM, CHJJ-FM

History
- First air date: 2003

Technical information
- Class: B
- ERP: 15 kWs
- HAAT: 135.8 metres (446 ft)

Links
- Webcast: UCB Radio Stations
- Website: ucbradio.com

CKJJ-FM is a Christian music radio station, broadcasting at 102.3 FM in Belleville, Ontario, Canada. The station began broadcasting in 2003 and is owned by United Christian Broadcasters Canada (UCB).

== Transmitters ==
Rebroadcasters of CKJJ-FM
City of licence	Identifier	Frequency	Power	Class	RECNet	CRTC Decision
Bancroft	CKJJ-FM-4	103.5 FM	250 watts	A1	Query	2008-109
Brockville	CKJJ-FM-2	99.9 FM	50 watts	LP	Query	2007-24
Kingston	CKJJ-FM-3	100.5 FM	50 watts	LP	Query	2008-54
Maynooth	CKJJ-FM-5	94.7 FM	50 watts	LP	Query	2014-323

The station also previously had a rebroadcaster in Chatham, which was converted to a new originating station, CKGW, in 2007.

In 2007, transmitters were added in Cobourg (100.9 MHz) and Brockville (99.9 MHz).

On September 22, 2006, UCB was denied a licence for 106.5 MHz at Foymount.

On January 29, 2009, UCB applied for a broadcasting licence for 1480 kHz in Newmarket, which was the former frequency occupied by CKDX up until the 1990s; it is unknown if this application was approved.

On September 10, 2009, UCB applied to change Cobourg's CKJJ-FM-1 frequency from 100.9 to 90.7 MHz. This application was denied on January 26, 2010. They would apply for it again on September 27, 2010, this time receiving approval on February 21, 2011, after the original repeater was forced to close down following the launch of CIYM-FM 100.9 in Brighton. Upon approval, the station received a new callsign, CHJJ-FM.

On June 16, 2014, UCB Canada received approval to add a new low power 50 watt transmitter at Maynooth, which will operate at 94.7 MHz.
