= Shine TV (New Zealand) =

- Country: New Zealand
- Broadcast area: National
- Headquarters: Auckland, New Zealand

Programming
- Picture format: 576i (SDTV 16:9)

History
- Launched: 2002

Links
- Website: Shine TV

Shine TV (formerly Freedom TV) is a New Zealand Christian television channel operated by Rhema Media and broadcast on Freeview Channel 25 and Sky TV channel 201. The station promotes Christian lifestyles, traditional Christian values, Gospel teachings and interdenominational Christian unity. From its outset, it has focused primarily on children, young people and family audiences.

The station broadcasts a mix of locally made and overseas news and current affairs, documentaries, movies, children's programmes, teaching programmes, youth shows and music shows. Some of Shine's programmes cover the international work of Christian missions, while others include personal testimony. As of 2015, it features promotions and news updates produced and presented by Cathy Jenke, Luke Weston, Davina William, Peter Shaw, Diane Davenport and Brad Mills.

Shine TV began broadcasting as Freedom TV in 1997, as a free-to-air UHF analogue TV channel in Christchurch. It relaunched as Shine TV in 2002, when it was added to Sky Television's digital platform. It expanded to Nelson on free-to-air UHF analogue in 2008, through a contract with local television channel Mainland TV. It was added to Freeview in 2010. Shine ceased broadcasting on its UHF frequencies in Christchurch and Nelson in 2013, when South Island analogue television was switched off.

== History ==
=== Freedom TV (1997–2002) ===
Shine TV began as Freedom TV, an independent local Christchurch station, in November 1997. It was based in the suburb of Burnside, and competed against two other local stations, Canterbury Television and NOW. The station broadcast mostly evangelical Christian programmes, and was sponsored by local evangelical churches and station director Warren Smith's Christian Superstore.

In early United Christian Broadcasters (UCB), the international arm of Rhema Media, purchased 34 UHF spectrum television licenses from Television New Zealand, following the closure of Horizon Pacific and MTV New Zealand. The licenses covered all major cities and towns except for Gisborne and allowed the company to reach all households with a UHF reception. UCB never used the licenses, and sold them to sold to Australian television company Prime Television Limited for A$ 3.6 million in June 1998. Prime New Zealand was launched on the spectrum two months later.

In 1999, Freedom TV met with United Christian Broadcasters, Alpha Video Trust and Dove Ministries, to discuss setting up a national broadcast centre in Auckland. The centre began operating in November 2000, with a studio, edit suites, film library, transmission control and production offices. It began producing programmes for Freedom TV in March 2001 to prepare the station for a nationwide launch.

=== Shine TV relaunch (2002) ===
In June 2002 Freedom TV signed a contract to provide a 24-hour Christian channel for Sky Television's digital platform, after deciding a nationwide UHF or UHF or VHF television station would be prohibitively expensive to set up. In August it transferred its Christchurch and Auckland operations to Shine TV, a new wholly owned subsidiary of the Rhema Media. This significantly increased Rhema's costs and staffing needs.

On 1 December 2002 Freedom TV officially became Shine TV, and began nationwide broadcasting on Sky. The channel was available to all Sky subscribers, and was part of a "Shine TV package" that locked adult material. The station's new name reflected two Biblical metaphors:

- Isaiah 60:1: "Arise and shine for your light has come and the Glory of the Lord is risen upon you. For behold the darkness shall cover the earth, and deep darkness the people: but the Lord will rise over you, and His Glory shall be seen upon you."
- Matthew 5:13-16: "You are the worlds seasoning to make it tolerable. If you lose your flavour what will happen to the world? And you yourselves will be thrown out and trampled underfoot as worthless. You are the World's light - a city on a hill, glowing in the night for all to see. Don't hide your light! Let it shine for all; let your good deeds glow for all to see, so that they will praise your heavenly Father."

=== Shine TV (since 2002) ===
Shine was promoted with a nationwide tour, and a billboard outside the Rhema Media building near Auckland's Southern Motorway. In 2006, Shine TV became one of the first New Zealand broadcasters to provide on-demand videos, before most New Zealanders even had access to broadband internet. In 2009, it still provided one of the few New Zealand on-demand services. Shine TV launched on Freeview on 1 April 2010. In June 2011, some Sky customers questioned why Shine TV was included in the basic package while other channels were being removed.

Shine TV continued to broadcast on free-to-air analogue in Christchurch through a contract with Freedom TV's original owner, New Zealand Television Ministries Trust until 2013. The lease covered Freedom TV's Christchurch facility, UHF broadcast license, transmission site and equipment. Shine TV Christchurch continued to broadcast local notices and advertisements, but was criticised for removing local programmes after other local stations like Canterbury Television and NOW had done the same. Shine also expanded to Nelson on free-to-air analogue channel 44 on 11 November 2008, through a similar contract with local television channel Mainland TV. Both frequencies were switched off by the government on 28 April 2013.

== Programmes ==
=== Nzone ===
Rhema Media operated a dedicated news department between 2004 and 2014. From 2004 to 2007 it produced two flagship television current affairs programmes - Nzone on Tuesday nights [hosted by Tim Sisarich] and Nzone Focus on Thursday nights (hosted by Bob McCoskrie), which was a longer-form current affairs programme. Both were produced by former TVNZ staffer, Pene Thomas. In 2007 The arrival of former Newstalk ZB and BBC radio journalist Allan Lee. enabled the department to progress the programme to a nightly 'live' news programme, Mondays to Fridays. Nzone Tonight was presented by Rachel Thomas or Asher Bastion, with sports segments from Andrew Curtis or Brooke Dobson. The executive producer was Allan Lee with Pene Thomas (now Ashby) as producer. Rhema staff members filed reports, and other sources were provided by Newstalk ZB, UCB UK and Voice of America. In 2009, Nzone reverted to being a weekly format, more like the original Nzone and was presented by interviewers Davina William and Allan Lee, with reports from other members of the Rhema News team. That format continued until its cancellation in 2014.

=== Other programmes ===
Shine TV's weekday line-up includes Christian children's puppet show What's in the Bible, Christian anime show Superbook and Christian World News bulletins. The channel broadcasts a range of Christian teaching programmes, including Destined to Reign with Joseph Prince, Answers with Bayless Conley, Harvest Life with Greg Laurie, Enjoying Everyday Life with Joyce Meyer, In Touch with Dr. Charles Stanley and Lakewood Church with Joel Osteen.

The station has received media attention for some of its shows. In 2013, New Zealand Herald columnist Paul Casserly said nightly Christian talk show The 700 Club was a "firm favourite as late-night stoner viewing" before the launch of Comedy Central New Zealand and video streaming websites. In 2015, Fairfax New Zealand reviewer Trevor Agnew described the message of Shine TV as "the end times are here".

Shine broadcasts a range of Christian music videos, including 30 minutes of worship music videos sponsored by the Rhema radio network every afternoon. Contemporary gospel artist Debbie Shepherd has performed live on-air. A Christchurch boy with Kartagener syndrome met guitarist Brian Welch after first being introduced to his music on Shine TV.

Shine TV also has a free streaming service on its website, which is available on iPhone, Apple TV, Android, Android TV, Roku, and Amazon Fire TV. Notable content includes The Chosen and When Calls the Heart television series.
