= The Word for Today =

Daily devotional written by Bob Gass

The Word For Today
- Editor: Bob Gass until his death in late 2019
- Frequency: Quarterly periodical
- Format: Daily devotional
- Publisher: Bob Gass Ministries (within the United States); United Christian Broadcasters (outside the United States)
- Total circulation: 3.5 million (2009)
- Founder: Bob Gass; Gareth Littler
- First issue: March 1, 1994
- Country: United States
- Language: English language Spanish language Portuguese language Afrikaans language Italian language
- Website: United States website United Kingdom website Australia website New Zealand website

Word 4U 2Day
- Frequency: Quarterly periodical
- Format: Daily devotional
- Publisher: United Christian Broadcasters (outside the United States)
- First issue: August 1, 2003
- Country: United Kingdom
- Language: English language
- Website: United Kingdom website Australia website New Zealand website

The Word For Today (known as The Word For You Today in some countries) is a free, daily devotional written by Northern Irish Christian pastor Bob Gass and published around the world by United Christian Broadcasters (UCB). Over 3.5 million copies are distributed quarterly worldwide. Gass said the devotional "is a kick start for cold mornings, when you don't feel like reading your Bible or find it a bit dry, that's when you need a good injection of inspiration. That's what I want to provide for our readers, something to focus their minds on God's goodness".

A million copies are distributed to UCB listeners, hospital patients, prisoners and residents of care centres throughout the United Kingdom and Ireland. Separate versions are produced for Albania, Australia, Canada, Czechoslovakia, Caribbean, Holland, Estonia, Portugal, Philippines, New Zealand, Nigeria, South Africa (Afrikaans and English languages), Spain and Italy by the UCB national UCB body or an affiliate. Another version is distributed by Bob Gass Ministries in the United States.

Production of a contemporary version called Word 4U 2Day (known as Word For You Today in some countries) began in August 2003. It was developed in conjunction with The Message Trust, a Christian youth ministry based in Manchester. It is an adaption of the original devotional, geared to appeal to the younger generations in society. The first edition of The Word 4U 2Day rolled off the press in time for August 2003 with a print run of quarter of a million copies. Since then it has increased in popularity and is popular with other age groups as well. (Word For You in the UK is now only available via the UCB Player app.)

== History ==
=== United Christian Broadcasters ===
United Christian Broadcasters was set up to Christian radio station Rhema Media in New Zealand, to allow groups in other countries set up similar stations in their own countries. It became an umbrella body for autonomous affiliate broadcasting organisations in different parts of the world. The first affiliate in Australia supported new Christian radio stations, called Rhema FM, before establishing its own group of radio stations, operating as the Vision Radio Network.

Other affiliates followed in the United Kingdom, Europe, Africa, Pacific countries, South America theDove in Oregon, United States. Smaller broadcasters were set up in Madagascar, Brazil, the Philippines and Estonia, by building up local support and then obtaining terrestrial licenses. At its height in 2011, UCB was a group of 32 organisations which claimed to reach millions of people in at least 24 different languages through radio, television, printed devotionals and websites. Several million copies of The Word for Today were published every quarter, in about a dozen languages.

=== The Word For Today ===
Gass (born 1944 died 5 June 2019) was an American-based Christian pastor, broadcaster and author of several books. He was raised in Northern Ireland, but moved to Atlanta, Georgia in the United States when he was 18 years old. Gass, along with his brother Neil and sister Ruth, were brought up in a strong Christian tradition by their mother after their father had died when Bob was just thirteen. He became involved in Christian leadership for over 40 years, but much of his inspiration was based on the Biblical principles instilled in him by his mother.

He began collating his inspirational writings in 1992 and in 1993 started sending copies to friends and supporters in the United States. Astounded by the response he received in the United States, Gass offered his devotional readings to Gareth Littler, the former Chief Executive Officer of UCB, to encourage their listeners. In April 1994, The Word For Today was launched with an initial print run of 3,500 copies and circulated to UCB's supporters within the UK. The reach was later expanded to other parts of the world.

=== Bob Gass Ministries ===
Gass ran Bob Gass Ministries from his home in Georgia, with an international purpose and scope. His organisation retains the right to distribute the devotional within the United States.

He has also written several books, including:

- A Fresh Word for Today, ISBN 0-88270-762-0
- Best of the Word for Today, ISBN 0-88270-731-0
- Forgetting Your Past, ISBN 0-88270-817-1
- Discovering Your Destiny, ISBN 0-88270-863-5
- Starting Over, ISBN 0-88270-828-7
