= DXCD =

The Edge Radio Kidapawan
- Kidapawan; Philippines
- Broadcast area: Eastern Cotabato and surrounding areas
- Frequency: 101.5 MHz
- Branding: The Edge Radio 101.5

Programming
- Languages: English, Cebuano, Filipino
- Format: Contemporary Christian Music, Talk
- Network: The Edge Radio

Ownership
- Owner: Christian Music Power

History
- First air date: 2010

Technical information
- Licensing authority: NTC
- Power: 5 kW

Links
- Website: positivelypinoy.com/blog/artist/edge-kidapawan

The Edge Radio 101.5 (DXCD 101.5 MHz) is an FM station owned and operated by Christian Music Power. Its studios and transmitter are located at Purok 2, Brgy. Balindog, Kidapawan.
