= United Christian Broadcasters =

International broadcasting and media group

- Industry: Broadcasting
- Founded: Christchurch, New Zealand (1960s)
- Headquarters: Auckland, New Zealand
- Key people: Hal Short (President)
- Website: UCB International

United Christian Broadcasters (UCB) is an international Christian broadcasting and media group, founded by Rhema Media. Through affiliates in twenty five countries, it operates radio and television stations and publishes and broadcasts Bob Gass's daily devotionals The Word for You Today and Word For You (young adults' version - from 1 February 2023, this is only available via the UCB Player app).

The group was started in New Zealand by Richard Berry, an evangelical Christian from Christchurch. In the early 1960s, Berry was inspired by Ecuadorian Christian short-wave radio station HCJB to set up a radio station in his garage. The station became a permanent operation in 1976, and in subsequent years it expanded throughout New Zealand.

The Rhema Media model was used to establish UCB affiliates in Australia, the United Kingdom, other Commonwealth countries, and beyond. In July 2010, UCB United Kingdom's UCB TV and the mobile TV and video on demand network Yamgo to launch the world's first ever live Christian mobile TV channel.

== The Word for You Today ==
The Word For You Today is a free, daily devotional written by Bob Gass and distributed internationally by United Christian Broadcasters, as website content, as an email newsletter and as quarterly print editions. One million copies of the United Kingdom and Ireland print edition are distributed each quarter to UCB supporters. Other regional editions are distributed to subscribers, churches and Christian organisations in other parts of the world.

Gass started writing The Word for Today devotional readings in 1992. After positive response in the United States, he offered international rights to the devotionals to United Christian Broadcasters CEO Gareth Littler, with a first print run of 3,500 copies in 1994 being distributed to UCB supporters in the United Kingdom.

== UCB in the UK ==
- United Kingdom
- Broadcast area: United Kingdom and Co. Louth, Co. Cavan and Co. Monaghan
- Frequency: DAB+: 11D/12A Digital One

Programming
- Format: Talk; Christian Music

Ownership
- Owner: United Christian Broadcasters ltd

Links
- Webcast: UCB Player
- Website: UCB

United Christian Broadcasters is a Christian media charity that exists to offer opportunities to hear, watch or read the Bible. UCB has two national Christian radio stations (UCB 1 and UCB 2), the UCB Player app, and several publications including two daily devotionals, the UCB Word For Today and Word For You for young adults. (From 1 February 2023, Word For You is only available via the UCB Player app.) They also run UCB Prayerline, staffed by volunteers who take calls from people requesting prayer.

=== UCB UK history ===
In 1986, UCB's founder Ian Mackie was inspired during prayer to provide a national Christian radio station. Operating out of a volunteer's spare bedroom, everything UCB owned was borrowed. In 1987, UCB did its initial broadcasts via Manx Radio in the Isle of Man, but this had limited geographical reach and only aired from 10p.m. until 2a.m. However, it did allow the station to bypass some of the UK's broadcasting laws and commence transmission earlier in the company's lifetime than would have otherwise been possible.

In 1991, a UCB member met Bob Gass, who began to write devotionals for them. A year later, he started sending copies of them to his friends and supporters in the United States, where he had lived since he was eighteen years old. Gass offered UCB his devotional readings to encourage Christians to support UCB.

With no access to national AM or FM frequencies, UCB Europe was granted a licence to commence satellite broadcasting. UCB Europe became the group's flagship station, and in April 1993, UCB Europe was first broadcast to the UK via the Astra satellite. In 1994, the first edition of the UCB Word For Today, written by Bob and Debby Gass, was published, and 3,500 copies were distributed for free. In January 1995 the group launched UCB's telephone Listening Line, a service to support and pray for listeners of the radio broadcasts, along with readers of the UCB Word For Today. A small team began work covering the phone lines for six hours on weekdays. In 1998, UCB began working with other Christian ministries to staff Listening Line.

From January 2003, UCB Listening Line became UCB Prayerline, operating from UCB headquarters in Stoke-on-Trent. In August 2003, Word 4U 2Day (now Word For You) was launched, adapted from the UCB Word For Today and designed for young adults. In 2006, UCB Radio began broadcasting on regional DAB radio in the London area and four other areas of the UK. In 2007, UCB began a formal alliance with OneHope, distributing Bible literature to children and youth in the UK. By 2009, UCB UK (now UCB 1) began broadcasting nationally on DAB radio.

In 2014, UCB began joint broadcasts on the Freeview TV channel of TBN UK, and launched the UCB Player app, which provides videos, podcasts and devotional content. In 2016 a second radio station, UCB 2, was launched on DAB radio. In 2019, UCB was distributing UCB Word For Today to over 400,000 readers in print and across digital platforms each quarter. Gass died in 2019, but left several volumes of content for the service to continue distribution after his death.

=== UCB 1 (formerly UCB UK) ===
UCB 1 is broadcast nationally in the UK with contemporary Christian music and discussions of the news and current affairs from a Christian perspective.

=== UCB 2 (Formerly UCB Inspirational) ===
UCB 2 is broadcast nationally across the UK with worship music and inspiring teaching.

=== UCB Prayerline and Forces Prayerline ===
UCB provide a confidential telephone service called UCB Prayerline with trained Christian volunteers who pray for callers' issues over the telephone. The service is supported by churches from across the United Kingdom and receives around 70,000 calls per year. A parallel service, the Forces Prayerline, was started in Germany in 2005 and extended to the UK on 6 November 2008 at St Clement Danes Church, London, on the occasion of the annual Armed Forces Day of Prayer. This service supports servicemen, servicewomen and their families at home and abroad.

== Rhema Media New Zealand ==
Rhema Media
- New Zealand

Programming
- Format: Rhema: talk radio (1978); S Star: CCM (1997); Life fm: CHR (1993); Shine: Christian TV (2004)

Ownership
- Owner: Rhema Broadcasting Group

Links
- Website: rhemamedia.co.nz

Rhema Media is the founding organisation of United Christian Broadcasting. It is also New Zealand's largest Christian media organisation, broadcasting four radio networks and a television station, and publishing the quarterly The Word for You Today devotional publication, from the Rhema Broadcasting Centre on Upper Queen Street in the central Auckland suburb of Newton.

=== Stations ===
The group's flagship network, New Zealand's Rhema, is an evangelical contemporary Christian radio network started in 1978. The initial programme/station manager, John McNeil, laid the groundwork for what became the network's relaxed talk and music format, in which a limited number of teaching programmes are intermingled with music, news and interviews.

Other stations include Southern Star, which plays classic contemporary Christian music and hymns, Life FM, a contemporary Christian hit radio network, and The Word, which broadcasts Bible readings. Rhema Media also operate Christian television channel Shine TV, which is available on Sky Television. UCB International previously owned, but never utilised, a network of New Zealand UHF stations now used by Prime TV.

== Vision Christian Media Australia ==
Vision Christian Media (formerly UCB Australia) operates the nationwide network "Vision Christian Radio", (previously called Vision Radio Network and Vision FM). It also publishes The Word for Today and word4U2day, coordinates the Vision Prayerline prayer ministry and provides mailorder Christian resource service Vision Shop Online. It was featured in the Andrew Denton documentary film God on My Side.

As at the close of 2008, Vision operated on over 360 licences, including low powered services in metropolitan suburbs and rural towns. It also operated some higher powered services in some regional areas and in Western Melbourne on 1611 AM. By mid-2015, Vision had expanded to over 600 relay stations, mainly LPON licences (low power open narrowcast) but also including Adelaide 1611 AM. Vision provides Christian talk and music programming. In September 2022 the number of relay stations was in excess of 780 across Australia.

=== Early history ===
Vision began broadcasting from small studios in Springwood, Brisbane, Australia on 1 February 1999. A few years later they moved into larger premises in nearby Underwood to better provide a 24-hour 7-day broadcast to some 300+ relay stations across the nation, plus listeners on the Internet and via satellite. Vision has been able to acquire over 600 high- and low-powered open narrowcast licenses and has quickly gone about the task of setting up a national network of relay stations across Australia, from the largest cities to regional centres and tiny isolated towns in the bush.

Many small- to medium-sized country towns in Australia have benefited from the cost-effective approach of using low-powered FM transmitters. Although typically only 1 to 10 watts, they usually give quite adequate residential coverage in small towns, depending on the antenna height above local terrain. The setup cost is very achievable for most communities and the ongoing cost is minimal due to low maintenance equipment with low power consumption – some even use solar power in remote areas.

=== Expansion ===
In the twelve months following March 2001 the number of relay stations 'on-air' tripled from around 30 to 90. Also in April 2001, Vision introduced Australia's first nationwide news service from a Christian perspective. Vision's News service is heard across their own network, as well as being accessed by a growing number of community stations who don't have the resources to produce their own news content. During 2003 Vision secured its first high-powered open narrowcast licences, which were soon put on air.

The network reached 150 relay stations by the end of 2003, and in the following year would see its first foray into AM radio sites in Shepparton, Bunbury and Kalgoorlie. Just prior to Christmas 2004 a further 17 high-powered licences were secured to be on air the following year. Vision's 200th relay station was powered up on Australia Day 2005 at the Central Australian town of Yulara – right next to Uluru (Ayers Rock). Yarrawonga in Victoria had the honour of station number 300 in late 2007 and a significant development occurred in late 2008 with the unexpected acquisition of a medium powered AM service in Melbourne (1611 kHz).

== Christian Music Power Philippines ==
The Edge Radio
- Type: Radio network
- Country: Philippines
- Headquarters: Taytay, Rizal
- Branding: The Edge Radio

Programming
- Language(s): English, Filipino
- Format: Contemporary Christian Music

Ownership
- Owner: Christian Music Power
- Parent: United Christian Broadcasters

History
- Founded: 2005

Coverage
- Availability: Regional

Links
- Webcast: Listen Live
- Website: edgemedia.ph

In the Philippines, United Christian Broadcasters operates The Edge Media network under Christian Music Power (formerly UCB Philippines). The station is an advocate for a Christian worldview and is used as a training ground for students from 15 Asian nations to learn how to open low cost stations in their countries. It plays contemporary Christian music from a wide range of Christian artists of various nationalities, including local contemporary Christian artists.

The Edge Media is available in two formats: The Edge Radio, a national radio station which is available nationwide via Cignal Channel 312 and worldwide via internet, with six FM stations across the country serves as affiliates; and The Edge TV, a blocktime program currently airs on Light TV in Metro Manila.

=== Stations ===
Branding	Callsign	Frequency	Power (Watts)	Location
The Edge Radio Philippines	—N/a	Cignal Channel 312	—N/a	Nationwide
The Edge Radio Kidapawan	DXCD	101.5 MHz	5,000 Watts	Kidapawan

== UCB Radio Canada ==
In Ontario, Canada, United Christian Broadcasters' Canadian affiliate operates six stations.

=== Stations ===
Callsign	Frequency	Power (Watts)	Location
CKJJ-FM	102.3 MHz	15,000 Watts	Belleville, Ontario
CKJJ-FM-5	94.7 MHz	50 Watts	Maynooth, Ontario
CKJJ-FM-4	103.5 MHz	250 Watts	Bancroft, Ontario
CKJJ-FM-3	100.5 MHz	50 Watts	Kingston, Ontario
CKJJ-FM-2	99.9 MHz	50 Watts	Brockville, Ontario
CHJJ-FM	90.7 MHz	250 Watts	Cobourg, Ontario
CKGW-FM	89.3 MHz	15,000 Watts	Chatham, Ontario
CJAH-FM	90.5 MHz	10,000 Watts	Windsor, Ontario
CJOA-FM	95.1 MHz	250 Watts	Thunder Bay, Ontario
CKOS-FM	91.1 MHz	40,000 Watts	Fort McMurray, Alberta
CJLT-FM	93.7 MHz	2.3 kW	Medicine Hat, Alberta
CIUC-FM	95.9 MHz	24,000 Watts	Regina, Saskatchewan
CIHX-FM	103.1 MHz	8,752 Watts average 14,000 Watts peak	Saskatoon, Saskatchewan

On 5 December 2014 the CRTC approved a new UCB outlet on 90.5 FM in Windsor, Ontario (CJAH-FM), which will broadcast with 1,730 watts (10,000 watts maximum ERP). CJAH-FM would begin testing on 19 October 2017 and is expected to be launched 2 December 2017.

On 8 May 2018 United Christian Broadcasters Media Canada received CRTC approval to launch a station in Regina, Saskatchewan on 107.9 MHz. On 12 July 2022 United Christian Broadcasters Media Canada submitted an application to change CIUC-FM's frequency from 107.9 MHz to 95.9 MHz. Power will be reduced from 100,000 to 24,000 watts. Antenna height will be lowered from 149.1 to 140.5 metres (490' to 460') (EHAAT). The radiation pattern will remain non-directional. On 7 September 2022 the CRTC approved UCB's application to change the frequency for CIUC-FM Regina from 107.9 MHz to 95.9 MHz.

In December 2023, UCBMC acquired CJLT-FM in Medicine Hat from Vista Radio, giving it its second Alberta station.

On 1 June 2024 UCB Radio (Canada) launched in Saskatoon, SK on 103.1 MHz.
