= CKGW-FM =

Christian radio station in Chatham, Ontario

Coordinates: 42°26′14″N 82°06′22″W

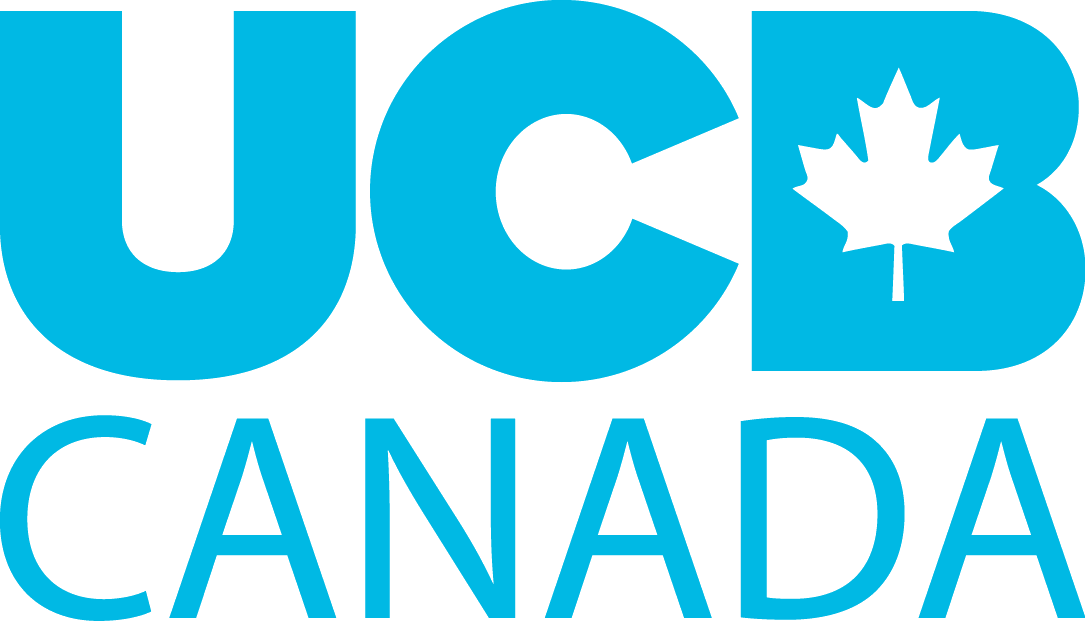
- Chatham-Kent, Ontario; Canada
- Frequency: 89.3 MHz
- Branding: UCB Canada

Programming
- Format: Contemporary Christian music

Ownership
- Owner: United Christian Broadcasters Canada
- Sister stations: CKJJ-FM

History
- First air date: November 3, 2007
- Call sign meaning: Chatham-Kent's Good Word

Technical information
- Class: B
- ERP: 18.7 kW
- HAAT: 133.4 metres (438 ft)

Links
- Webcast: UCB Webstreams
- Website: ucbradio.com

CKGW-FM is a Christian music radio station broadcasting at 89.3 FM in Chatham-Kent, Ontario, Canada. The station is owned by United Christian Broadcasters Canada (UCB). It was originally a rebroadcaster of CKJJ-FM from Belleville, but became an independent station in April 2007.
