= Rhema Media =

Christian media organization in New Zealand

- Industry: Broadcasting
- Predecessor: Banbury Recordings International, Rhema Broadcasting Group
- Founded: Christchurch, New Zealand (1976)
- Headquarters: Auckland, New Zealand
- Area served: New Zealand
- Key people: Luke Weston, CEO
- Services: 1978
- Website: rhemamedia.co.nz

Rhema Media (previously known as Rhema Broadcasting Group or RBG) is a Christian media organisation in New Zealand. It owns radio networks Rhema, Life FM and Sanctuary, and television station Shine TV. It also publishes Bob Gass's quarterly devotional publication The Word For Today, and a youth version called The Word For You Today. Rhema Media is based in Newton, Auckland and is the founding organisation of United Christian Broadcasters (UCB).

Rhema Media was set up in the 1960s by Christchurch evangelical Richard Berry, following the success of Ecuadorian Christian short-wave radio station HCJB. The company's flagship network Rhema (then New Zealand's Rhema) began full-time broadcasting on 11 November 1978. In 1997 the company launched the additional radio brands of Life FM and Star (then Southern Star). Shine TV was launched in 2002, and The Word radio network operated between 2007 and 2015.

== History ==
=== 1960s–1978 ===
Rhema Media began in the 1960s as Gospel Radio Fellowship, a small group of evangelical Christians who wanted to set up a radio station in Christchurch. The New Zealand Government legalised private radio, after illegal pirate broadcasts by Radio Hauraki in the Hauraki Gulf. The fellowship set up a radio studio and transmitter in an old church building and applied to the Broadcasting Authority for permission to broadcast in 1972. However, the authority was skeptical about the need for an evangelical radio station, and declined the station's application based on a lack of public interest, finance and professional staff.

Gospel Radio Fellowship changed its name to Radio Rhema in 1974, and raised enough money to employ twenty staff. It received a one-day license for Christchurch in November 1974, a one-day license for Petone in October 1975, and a 10-day Christmas license for Christchurch in 1976. The broadcasts had to be live, medium wave, no more than 100 watts, and only directed at supporters. The station published newsletters for its Christchurch and Wellington listeners, and launched a monthly publication, Frequency, in 1977.

Radio Rhema gained a permanent licence in 1978 after about 55,000 people pledged their support to the station. It was launched by prime minister Robert Muldoon, who said the station promoted "a faith that moves mountains", and made its first broadcast officially on 11 November 1978. The station was allowed to broadcast six hours a day on weekdays and 18 hours a day on weekends, making it the first permanent Christian station in the British Commonwealth and one of the first Christian broadcasters in the world.

=== 1978–1997 ===
In 1980 the station was allowed to broadcast 18 hours every day, and had thirty five full-time and ten part-time workers. In 1982 it gained a license in Wellington. and purchased a property in Auckland where it employed six staff. In 1986 it began broadcasting in Auckland and attracted a niche following. and in 1989 it received approval to begin broadcasting in Dunedin.

Radio Rhema was one of the largest private radio networks in the country by the late 1980s. According to radio reviews in the New Zealand Listener, its programming included evangelical programmes, Biblical teachings, and politically conservative talkback. Sociologists Sue Middleton and Allanah Ryan argued the expansion of Radio Rhema was evidence of the growth of the Christian right.

In 1987, vice-presidents Richard Berry, Hal Short and Frank Salisbury also set up a separate organisation, United Christian Broadcasters (UCB) to support similar stations in other countries. The organisation's Australian branch supported Christian radio stations, many called Radio Rhema, before it set up its own broadcaster, the Vision Radio Network. Other affiliates followed in the United Kingdom, Europe, Africa, Pacific countries and South America. The Dove was set up as an affiliate in Oregon, United States. Smaller broadcasters were also established in Madagascar, Brazil, the Philippines and Estonia. In 1994, UCB was granted the right to publish The Word For Today, a quarterly catalogue of daily Biblical teachings by American preacher Bob Gass, in the United Kingdom. After an initial trial, Gass granted UCB the rights to broadcast, publish and distribute the devotional anywhere outside the United States free of charge.

In 1993 Radio Rhema launched its second station, Life FM in Christchurch.

The Christchurch Radio Rhema building was sold to NZI for $5 million in 1995.

=== 1997–2002 ===
The Radio Rhema company changed its name to Rhema Broadcasting Group in 1997, when it moved its sister station Life FM from Christchurch to Auckland, as well as launching another sister network, Star. They used frequencies secured in 1991, swapped frequencies with The Radio Network, and leased some frequencies from other companies. Star lost its frequencies in Auckland and Christchurch in 1998, but was able to continue broadcasting in both centres by leasing airtime from the AM Network outside of the sitting hours of the New Zealand Parliament. Rhema celebrated 20 years on air with a function in Christchurch in 1998.

Rhema Broadcasting Group took over the operation of local Christchurch television channel Freedom TV in 2002, relaunching it as Shine TV in December 2002. It began broadcasting on Sky TV from its launch, and later expanded to UHF in Nelson and Freeview in Christchurch. United Christian Broadcasters previously owned a network UHF station licences, but sold them to Prime TV.

=== 2002–2012 ===
The fifth Labour government put forward plans to renew radio frequencies in 2003, but Rhema Broadcasting Group and the Crown did not agree on the value of re-licensing until 2006. In July 2010, RBG announced it needed to raise $6.4 million over and above its normal operating costs to renew its commercial radio frequencies for the following 20 years. By the end of November, the company still needed $2.4 million and was not in a position to seek external finance, with the frequencies to be returned to the Crown and resold at auction if the money was not raised. The Crown recognised the organisation as a non-profit with limited access to funds and gave it a three-month extension on payment, allowing Rhema Broadcasting Group to cover the cost with no interest loans.

In 2007, Rhema Broadcasting Group launched The Word, a network of relay stations broadcasting uninterrupted, automated Bible readings. The station was similar to a digital station UCB was already operating in the UK. The network's original Hamilton 576 AM and Invercargill 1026 AM frequencies were acquired for Star, but became available when Star starting broadcasting on new AM Network stations in both cities. The Word was later extended to New Plymouth 1278 AM, Christchurch 540 AM, Dunedin 1377 AM, Te Anau 88.0 FM, and an independently-owned low-power FM station in Tokoroa. The station was also streamed over the Internet.

By 2011, UCB consisted of 32 organisations which claimed to reach millions of people in at least 24 different languages through radio, television, printed devotionals and websites. The group was publishing several million copies of The Word for Today were published every quarter, in about a dozen languages.

=== 2012–present ===
Andrew Fraser served as CEO of Rhema Media until September 2024. He was appointed to the role in December 2016, after joining as general manager operations in 2002 . In December 2012, chief executive John Fabrin left the organisation and Mike Brewer, former general manager of Fairfax New Zealand's Taranaki Newspapers company, became chief executive. In 2019, Fraser said 80 percent of the organisation's income was through donations, from a pool of about 25,000 supporters.

Shine TV ceased broadcasting on UHF in Christchurch and Nelson on 28 April 2013, when South Island analogue television was switched off. RBG was rebranded as Rhema Media in February 2014. Short, UCB's president, stepped aside from RBG and UCB in March 2013. The Word closed down in the first half of 2015. In June 2019, Rhema Media sold its 7,000 Christian and Gospel music records on the auction website TradeMe.

By late 2024, Luke Weston had been appointed as CEO of Rhema Media following a search by the company's board. By April 2025, Rhema Media under Weston's leadership had launched a new FM radio station called "Sanctuary" and several new mobile apps. The company operates a subscription model based on donations, bequests and advertising. As of April 2025, Rhema Media had about 30,000 donors.

== Services ==
=== Rhema ===
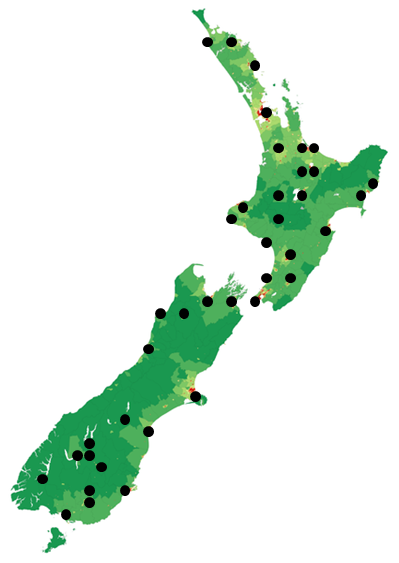
This is a map of Rhema frequencies.

Rhema (formerly known as Radio Rhema and New Zealand's Rhema) is an evangelical Christian contemporary music radio network targeted towards families. It broadcasts a range of music, current affairs interviews, conversations, teaching programmes and on-air charity fundraisers, with a focus on relationships, marriage and parenting.

The network's programmes include entertainment programme 'Rhema is super excited to announce a brand new line up! After 2.5 years of simulcasting the Morning Wakeup on Rhema and Life FM, Rhema now has its very own Breakfast programme hosted by Andrew Curtis and Nerida Ashcroft! Rhema 'Days' join Kat McCormack and Tom Francis for Rhema’s Day Show., 'Afternoons' with hosts Di Campbell and Andrew Urquhart and 'Nights' with Luke Weston . The network also broadcasts teaching programmes from Joyce Meyer, Focus on the Family and Adventures in Odyssey. Some hosts also work as counselors, church pastors, stand-up comedians and MCs. Hosts have also endorsed events. Previous hosts include Aaron Ironside,Bob McCoskrie, Rob Holding, Tim Sisarich and Pat Brittenden.

- Kaitaia - 549 AM
- Kaikohe - 99.9 FM
- Bay of Islands - 99.9 FM
- Whangarei - 621 AM
- Auckland - 1251 AM
- Hamilton - 855 AM
- Bay of Plenty - 104.6 FM
- Rotorua - 93.5 FM
- Tokoroa - 99.7 FM
- Gisborne - 103.7 FM
- Wairoa - 92.5 FM
- Taupō - 95.2 FM
- Taumarunui - 97.5 FM
- Hawke's Bay - 99.1 FM
- Taranaki - 540 AM
- Ōpunake - 93.6 FM
- Raetihi - 95 FM
- Whanganui - 104.8 FM
- Manawatū - 91.4 FM
- Kāpiti Coast - 103.9 FM
- Wairarapa - 97.5 FM
- Wellington - 972 AM
- Picton - 103.5 FM
- Blenheim - 104.1 FM
- Kaikōura - 105.1 FM
- Nelson - 801 AM
- Murchison - 97.3 FM
- Westport - 94.9 FM
- Reefton - 95.9 FM
- Greymouth - 92.3 FM
- Christchurch - 1503 AM
- Timaru - 104.3 FM
- Twizel - 91.8 FM
- Oamaru - 106.4 FM
- Wānaka - 89.0 FM
- Queenstown - 94.4 FM
- Cromwell - 89.5 FM
- Alexandra - 92.7 FM
- Te Anau - 94.4 FM
- Dunedin - 621 AM
- Balclutha - 96.1 FM
- Gore/Tapanui - 99.2 FM
- Clinton - 88.3 FM
- Invercargill - 1404 AM

=== Life FM ===
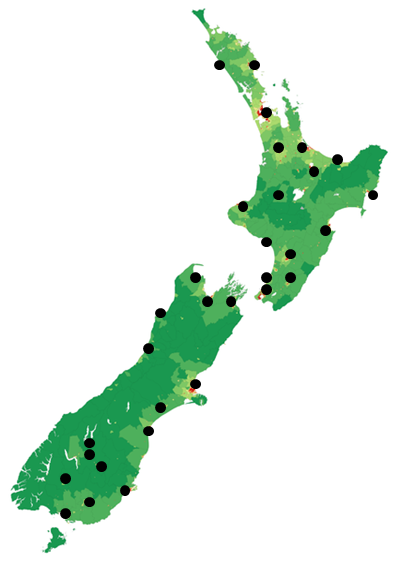
This is a map of Life FM frequencies.

Life FM is a contemporary Christian music evangelical youth-oriented radio network. According to Colmar Brunton research commissioned by Rhema Media in 2010, listeners credit the station with helping them make positive life choices. The station's programmes include 'The All New Morning Wake Up' with Sela Alo, Bjorn Brickell & Becks Birmingham 'Days' with Eloise Packham, New 'Afternoons' with Leanna Cooper & Josh Coombridge & New 'Nights' with Baty .

Life FM was launched in Christchurch and came on-air on 6 March 1993. Then four years later it was moved to broadcast from Auckland into Auckland, Waikato and the Bay of Plenty on the 26th of October 1997. Since then hosts have included Aaron Ironside, Clinton Randell, Holly Wiseman, Diane Campbell, Ken Green, Mike OB, Elmo Johnstone, Luke Weston, Paul Burnett, Becci Johnstone, Frank Richie, Tom Francis Jason Strong, Sherryn Tai and Charlie Moreland.

The network draws 75% of its operating costs from listener donations, and uses an annual fundraising appeal event to cover most of those costs. The 2011 fundraising appeal, which occurred just two weeks after the 2011 Christchurch earthquake, was used to raise funds for church-led disaster relief.

- Kaitaia - 103.5 FM
- Kaikohe Waimamaku - 106.3 FM
- Whangarei - 98.8 FM
- Dargaville - 104.2 FM
- Auckland - 99.8 FM
- Waikato - 94.6 FM
- Tauranga - 94.6 FM
- Whakatane - 104.9 FM
- Rotorua - 106.3 FM
- Taupō - 105.6 FM
- Gisborne - 100.5 FM
- Taumarunui - 96.7 FM
- Raetihi - 98.2 FM
- Hawke's Bay - 93.5 FM
- Taranaki - 99.6 FM
- Whanganui - 100.8 FM
- Manawatū - 96.2 FM
- Kāpiti Coast - 96.7 FM
- Wairarapa - 88.7 FM
- Wellington - 98.1 FM
- Nelson - 93.6 FM
- Picton - 91.5 FM
- Blenheim - 93.7 FM
- Golden Bay - 93.4 FM
- Westport - 104.5 FM
- Greymouth - 94.7 FM
- Rangiora - 106.8 (low-power)
- Christchurch - 94.1 FM 87.6 FM (low-power)
- Ashburton - 91.7 FM
- Timaru - 105.1 FM
- Oamaru - 95.2 FM
- Wānaka - 105 FM
- Cromwell - 91.1 FM
- Alexandra - 103.9 FM
- Te Anau - 91.2 FM
- Dunedin - 94.2 FM
- Balclutha - 92.1 FM
- Gore - 105.6 FM
- Invercargill 100 FM

=== Star ===
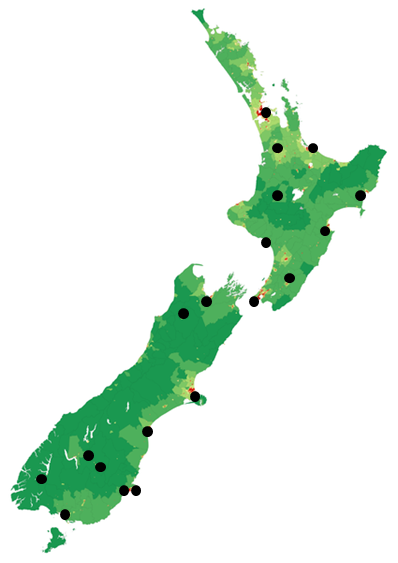
This is a map of Star frequencies.

Star (known as Southern Star until 2015) plays contemporary Christian music, hymns and Biblical teachings. It is owned and operated by Rhema Media. Rhema Media describes it as "a smooth and easy blend of music from people you know and trust", including modern hymns, easy listening tracks and instrumentals. Star broadcasts on the AM Network outside the sitting hours of the New Zealand Parliament

The station's programmes include Breakfast with Cathy Jenke and Peter Shaw, Days with Lizzie Oakes, Drive with a very tall man Gary Hoogvliet and Nights with Rosemary Jane. Previous hosts include Aaron Ironside, Rachel Thomas, Brian Ferguson, Glen Stephenson, UCB staff James Totton, Katikati His FM manager Rob Holding, Andrew Urquhart and Diane Campbell. Contributors include landscape designer and gardening expert Debbie Olsen, who previously hosted a gardening show on sister station Rhema.

- Kamo - 106.7 FM
- Dargaville - 107.7 FM
- Auckland - 882 AM (AM Network)
- Hamilton - 576 AM and 1494 AM (AM Network)
- Tauranga - 540 AM and 657 AM (AM Network)
- Taupō - 88.3 FM / 106.9 FM
- Gisborne - 92.5 FM
- Taumarunui - 95.9 FM
- Taranaki - 612 AM
- Raetihi - 92.6 FM
- Hawke's Bay - 909 AM (AM Network)
- Wanganui - 594 AM
- Wairarapa - 100.7 FM
- Wellington - 657 AM (AM Network)
- Nelson - 612 AM
- Murchison - 88.3 FM
- Westport - 103.7 FM
- Greymouth - 104.3 FM
- Christchurch - 612 AM and 963 AM (AM Network)
- Timaru - 594 AM
- Wānaka - 87.6 FM
- Queenstown - 107.0 FM
- Cromwell - 87.6 FM
- Alexandra - 100.7 FM
- Te Anau - 89.6 FM
- Dunedin - 900 AM (AM Network) and 1377 AM
- Balclutha - 88.9FM
- Invercargill - 1026 AM and 1314 AM (AM Network)

=== Shine TV ===
Shine TV station broadcasts on Freeview Channel 25 and Sky TV channel 201, and features locally made and overseas news and current affairs, documentaries, movies, children's programmes, teaching programmes, and youth and music programmes. Some of Shine's programmes cover the international work of Christian missions, while others include personal testimony.

=== The Word for Today ===
Rhema Media is the New Zealand publisher of The Word For Today, a free daily devotional written by Bob Gass and published around the world by the United Christian Broadcasters group. An initial print run of 3,500 copies was made in April 1994 in the United Kingdom before it was expanded to New Zealand in 1997. An estimated 3.5 million copies are distributed quarterly worldwide, with country-specific and translated versions also produced in Albania, Australia, Canada, Czechoslovakia, Caribbean, the Netherlands, Estonia, Portugal, Philippines, Nigeria, South Africa, Spain and the USA.

In conjunction with The Message Trust, a Christian youth ministry based in Manchester, The Word For Today has been adapted for younger audiences with Word For You Today. The devotional began in August 2003, and has been printed in New Zealand since February 2010. An audio version is also broadcast on Life fm.
