= CKOS-FM =

Christian radio station in Fort McMurray, Alberta

Coordinates: 56°40′11″N 111°20′01″W

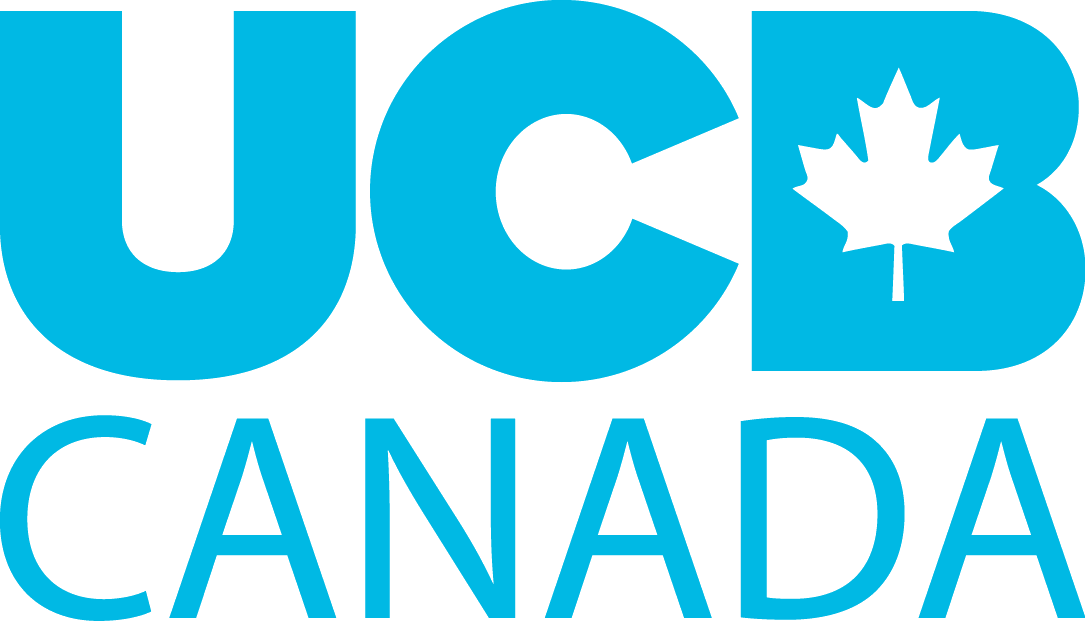
- Fort McMurray, Alberta; Canada
- Frequency: 91.1 MHz
- Branding: UCB Canada

Programming
- Format: Contemporary Christian music

Ownership
- Owner: United Christian Broadcasters Canada (UCB Canada)

History
- First air date: June 4, 2007
- Call sign meaning: Former brand of "KAOS"

Technical information
- Class: B
- ERP: Vertical Polarization: 10.625 kWs; Horizontal Polarization: 25 kW
- HAAT: 121.5 metres (399 ft)

Links
- Webcast: UCB Webstreams
- Website: ucbcanada.com

CKOS-FM is a contemporary Christian music radio station serving Fort McMurray, Alberta owned by United Christian Broadcasters Canada (UCB Canada) (formally owned by King's Kids Promotions Outreach Ministries). The station received approval by the CRTC in 2006. CKOS broadcasts at 91.1 MHz and streams live on the internet as well.

The station changed its name from KAOS 91.1, which it held for 10 years, to 91.1 The Bridge on March 12, 2017. On April 30, 2019, CKOS-FM officially launched as UCB Canada 91.1 FM under the ownership of United Christian Broadcasters Canada (UCB Canada).

CKOS-FM is also the former high school radio station for Overlea Secondary School in East York, Ontario.
